= List of moths of North America (MONA 8322–11233) =

North American moths represent about 12,000 types of moths. In comparison, there are about 825 species of North American butterflies. The moths (mostly nocturnal) and butterflies (mostly diurnal) together make up the taxonomic order Lepidoptera.

This list is sorted by MONA number (MONA is short for Moths of America North of Mexico). A numbering system for North American moths introduced by Ronald W. Hodges et al. in 1983 in the publication Check List of the Lepidoptera of America North of Mexico. The list has since been updated, but the placement in families is outdated for some species.

This list covers America north of Mexico (effectively the continental United States and Canada). For a list of moths and butterflies recorded from the state of Hawaii, see List of Lepidoptera of Hawaii.

This is a partial list, covering moths with MONA numbers ranging from 8322 to 11233. For the rest of the list, see List of moths of North America.

== Noctuidae ==
- 8322 – Idia americalis, American idia moth
- 8323 – Idia aemula, common idia moth
- 8323.1 – Idia concisa
- 8324 – Idia majoralis, greater idia moth
- 8325 – Idia suffusalis
- 8326 – Idia rotundalis, rotund idia moth
- 8327 – Idia forbesii
- 8328 – Idia julia
- 8329 – Idia diminuendis, orange-spotted idia moth
- 8330 – Idia scobialis, smoky idia moth
- 8331 – Idia laurentii
- 8332 – Idia terrebralis
- 8333 – Idia denticulalis, toothed idia moth
- 8334 – Idia lubricalis, glossy black idia moth
- 8334.1 – Idia occidentalis
- 8335 – Idia parvulalis
- 8336 – Idia gopheri
- 8337 – Idia immaculalis
- 8338 – Phalaenophana pyramusalis, dark-banded owlet moth
- 8339 – Phalaenophana extremalis
- 8339.1 – Simplicia cornicalis
- 8340 – Zanclognatha lituralis, lettered zanclognatha moth
- 8341 – Zanclognatha theralis
- 8343 – Zanclognatha minoralis
- 8345 – Zanclognatha laevigata, variable zanclognatha moth
- 8346 – Zanclognatha atrilineella
- 8347 – Zanclognatha obscuripennis, dark zanclognatha moth
- 8348 – Zanclognatha pedipilalis, grayish zanclognatha moth
- 8349 – Zanclognatha protumnusalis
- 8350 – Zanclognatha martha
- 8351 – Zanclognatha cruralis, early zanclognatha moth
- 8352 – Zanclognatha marcidilinea, yellowish zanclognatha moth
- 8353 – Zanclognatha jacchusalis, wavy-lined zanclognatha moth
- 8354 – Zanclognatha lutalba
- 8355 – Chytolita morbidalis, morbid owlet moth
- 8356 – Chytolita petrealis, stone-winged owlet moth
- 8357 – Macrochilo absorptalis, slant-lined owlet moth
- 8357.1 – Macrochilo hypocritalis, twin-dotted macrochilo moth
- 8358 – Macrochilo litophora, brown-lined owlet moth
- 8359 – Macrochilo bivittata, two-striped owlet moth
- 8359.1 – Macrochilo santerivalis
- 8360 – Macrochilo orciferalis, bronzy macrochilo moth
- 8361 – Macrochilo louisiana, Louisiana macrochilo moth
- 8362 – Phalaenostola metonalis, pale phalaenostola moth
- 8363 – Phalaenostola eumelusalis, dark phalaenostola moth
- 8364 – Phalaenostola larentioides, black-banded owlet moth
- 8365 – Phalaenostola hanhami, Hanham's owlet moth
- 8366 – Tetanolita mynesalis, smoky tetanolita moth
- 8367 – Tetanolita palligera
- 8368 – Tetanolita floridana, Florida tetanolita moth
- 8369 – Tetanolita negalis
- 8370 – Bleptina caradrinalis, bent-winged owlet moth
- 8370.1 – Bleptina araealis
- 8371 – Bleptina inferior
- 8372 – Bleptina sangamonia
- 8373 – Bleptina flaviguttalis
- 8374 – Bleptina minimalis
- 8375 – Bleptina hydrillalis
- 8376 – Hypenula cacuminalis, long-horned owlet moth
- 8377 – Hypenula caminalis
- 8378 – Renia salusalis
- 8379 – Renia factiosalis, sociable renia moth
- 8380 – Renia nemoralis, chocolate renia moth
- 8381 – Renia discoloralis, discolored renia moth
- 8382 – Renia pulverosalis
- 8383 – Renia hutsoni
- 8384 – Renia rigida
- 8384.1 – Renia flavipunctalis, yellow-spotted renia moth
- 8385 – Renia fraternalis, fraternal renia moth
- 8386 – Renia adspergillus, speckled renia moth
- 8387 – Renia sobrialis, sober renia moth
- 8388 – Renia subterminalis
- 8389 – Renia mortualis
- 8390 – Aristaria theroalis
- 8390.1 – Aglaonice otignatha
- 8390.2 – Physula albipunctilla
- 8391 – Carteris oculatalis, dotted carteris moth
- 8391.1 – Carteris lineata
- 8392 – Phlyctaina irrigualis
- 8393 – Lascoria ambigualis, ambiguous moth
- 8394 – Lascoria aon
- 8395 – Lascoria alucitalis
- 8396 – Lascoria orneodalis
- 8397 – Palthis angulalis, dark-spotted palthis moth
- 8398 – Palthis asopialis, faint-spotted palthis moth
- 8399 – Rejectaria albisinuata
- 8400 – Redectis pygmaea, pygmy redectis moth
- 8401 – Redectis vitrea, white-spotted redectis moth
- 8402 – Macristis bilinealis
- 8402.1 – Macristis geminipunctalis
- 8403 – Macristis schausi
- 8404 – Rivula propinqualis, spotted grass moth
- 8404.1 – Rivula pusilla
- 8404.2 – Rivula stepheni
- 8405 – Oxycilla tripla
- 8406 – Oxycilla basipallida
- 8407 – Oxycilla malaca, bent-lined tan moth
- 8408 – Oxycilla mitographa
- 8409 – Oxycilla ondo
- 8410 – Zelicodes linearis
- 8411 – Colobochyla interpuncta, yellow-lined owlet moth
- 8412 – Melanomma auricinctaria, gold-lined melanomma moth
- 8413 – Mycterophora inexplicata
- 8414 – Mycterophora monticola
- 8415 – Mycterophora longipalpata, long-palped mycterophora moth
- 8416 – Mycterophora geometriformis
- 8417 – Mycterophora rubricans
- 8418 – Parascotia fuliginaria, waved black moth
- 8419 – Prosoparia perfuscaria
- 8419.1 – Prosoparia anormalis
- 8419.2 – Prosoparia floridana
- 8420 – Hypenodes caducus, large hypenodes moth
- 8421 – Hypenodes fractilinea, broken-line hypenodes moth
- 8422 – Hypenodes palustris
- 8423 – Hypenodes sombrus
- 8424 – Hypenodes franclemonti
- 8425 – Dasyblemma straminea
- 8426 – Dyspyralis illocata, visitation moth
- 8427 – Dyspyralis puncticosta, spot-edged dyspyralis moth
- 8428 – Dyspyralis nigellus
- 8429 – Dyspyralis noloides
- 8430 – Parahypenodes quadralis, masked parahypenodes moth
- 8431 – Schrankia macula, black-spotted schrankia moth
- 8432 – Sigela brauneata
- 8433 – Sigela penumbrata
- 8434 – Sigela basipunctaria
- 8435 – Sigela eoides
- 8436 – Abablemma grandimacula
- 8437 – Abablemma brimleyana
- 8438 – Abablemma bilineata
- 8438.1 – Abablemma duomaculata
- 8439 – Phobolosia anfracta
- 8440 – Nigetia formosalis, thin-winged owlet moth
- 8441 – Hypena manalis, flowing-line bomolocha moth
- 8442 – Hypena baltimoralis, Baltimore bomolocha moth
- 8442.1 – Hypena ramstadtii
- 8443 – Hypena bijugalis, dimorphic bomolocha moth
- 8444 – Hypena palparia, mottled bomolocha moth
- 8445 – Hypena abalienalis, white-lined bomolocha moth
- 8446 – Hypena deceptalis, deceptive bomolocha moth
- 8447 – Hypena madefactalis, gray-edged bomolocha moth
- 8447.1 – Hypena appalachiensis
- 8448 – Hypena sordidula, sordid bomolocha moth
- 8448.1 – Hypena subidalis
- 8449 – Hypena heuloa
- 8450 – Hypena atomaria
- 8451 – Hypena vega
- 8452 – Hypena edictalis, large bomolocha moth
- 8453 – Hypena umbralis
- 8454 – Hypena variabilis
- 8454.1 – Hypena vetustalis
- 8455 – Hypena eductalis
- 8456 – Hypena abjuralis
- 8457 – Hypena minualis, sooty bomolocha moth
- 8458 – Hypena annulalis
- 8459 – Hypena degasalis
- 8460 – Hypena porrectalis
- 8461 – Hypena humuli, hop vine moth
- 8462 – Hypena californica
- 8463 – Hypena decorata
- 8464 – Hypena modestoides
- 8465 – Hypena scabra, green cloverworm moth
- 8466 – Tathorhynchus exsiccata
- 8467 – Hemeroplanis scopulepes, variable tropic moth
- 8468 – Hemeroplanis punitalis
- 8469 – Hemeroplanis secundalis
- 8470 – Hemeroplanis reversalis
- 8471 – Hemeroplanis habitalis, black-dotted hemeroplanis moth
- 8472 – Hemeroplanis historialis
- 8473 – Hemeroplanis finitima
- 8474 – Hemeroplanis incusalis
- 8475 – Hemeroplanis parallela
- 8475.1 – Hemeroplanis rectalis
- 8476 – Hemeroplanis immaculalis
- 8477 – Hemeroplanis obliqualis
- 8477.1 – Hemeroplanis trilineosa
- 8477.2 – Mursa phtisialis
- 8478 – Glympis concors
- 8479 – Spargaloma sexpunctata, six-spotted gray moth
- 8480 – Phytometra ernestinana, Ernestine's moth
- 8481 – Phytometra rhodarialis, pink-bordered yellow moth
- 8482 – Phytometra apicata
- 8483 – Phytometra obliqualis
- 8484 – Phytometra orgiae
- 8485 – Nychioptera noctuidalis
- 8486 – Nychioptera accola
- 8487 – Nychioptera opada
- 8488 – Hormoschista latipalpis, double-lined brown moth
- 8489 – Ommatochila mundula
- 8490 – Pangrapta decoralis, decorated owlet moth
- 8491 – Ledaea perditalis, lost owlet moth
- 8492 – Isogona natatrix
- 8493 – Isogona tenuis, thin-lined owlet moth
- 8494 – Isogona texana
- 8495 – Isogona punctipennis
- 8496 – Isogona segura
- 8497 – Isogona snowi, Snow's owlet moth
- 8498 – Isogona scindens
- 8499 – Metalectra discalis, common fungus moth
- 8500 – Metalectra quadrisignata, four-spotted fungus moth
- 8501 – Metalectra bigallis
- 8502 – Metalectra tantillus, black fungus moth
- 8503 – Metalectra diabolica, diabolical fungus moth
- 8504 – Metalectra albilinea
- 8505 – Metalectra richardsi, Richards' fungus moth
- 8506 – Metalectra miserulata
- 8507 – Metalectra edilis
- 8507.1 – Metalectra geminicincta
- 8508 – Metalectra cinctus
- 8509 – Arugisa lutea, common arugisa moth
- 8510 – Arugisa latiorella, Watson's arugisa moth
- 8511 – Arugisa punctalis
- 8512 – Pseudorgyia versuta
- 8513 – Pseudorgyia russula
- 8514 – Scolecocampa liburna, deadwood borer moth
- 8515 – Scolecocampa atriluna
- 8515.5 – Rhosologia porrecta
- 8516 – Pharga pallens
- 8517 – Palpidia pallidior
- 8518 – Gabara obscura
- 8519 – Gabara gigantea
- 8520 – Gabara stygialis
- 8521 – Gabara infumata
- 8522 – Gabara subnivosella
- 8523 – Gabara distema
- 8524 – Gabara pulverosalis
- 8525 – Phyprosopus callitrichoides, curve-lined owlet moth
- 8526 – Phyprosopus calligrapha
- 8527 – Hypsoropha monilis, large necklace moth
- 8528 – Hypsoropha hormos, small necklace moth
- 8528.1 – Hypsoropha baja
- 8529 – Psammathodoxa cochlidioides
- 8530 – Cecharismena cara
- 8532 – Cecharismena nectarea
- 8532.1 – Cecharismena jalapena
- 8533 – Cecharismena anartoides
- 8534 – Plusiodonta compressipalpis, moonseed moth
- 8535 – Plusiodonta amado
- 8536 – Calyptra canadensis, Canadian owlet moth
- no number yet – Dinumma deponens
- 8537 – Gonodonta sicheas
- 8538 – Gonodonta sinaldus
- 8539 – Gonodonta pyrgo
- 8540 – Gonodonta nutrix, citrus fruit-piercer moth
- 8541 – Gonodonta unica
- 8542 – Gonodonta incurva
- 8542.1 – Gonodonta bidens
- 8542.2 – Gonodonta fulvangula
- 8542.3 – Gonodonta nitidimacula
- 8543 – Eudocima apta
- 8543.1 – Eudocima serpentifera
- 8543.2 – Eudocima tyrannus
- 8544 – Goniapteryx servia
- 8545 – Anomis erosa, yellow scallop moth
- 8546 – Anomis flava, tropical anomis moth
- 8547 – Anomis privata, hibiscus-leaf caterpillar moth
- 8548 – Anomis impasta
- 8549 – Anomis luridula
- 8550 – Anomis texana
- 8551 – Anomis illita, okra leafworm moth
- 8552 – Anomis exacta
- 8553 – Anomis editrix
- 8554 – Alabama argillacea, cotton leafworm moth
- 8555 – Scoliopteryx libatrix, herald moth
- 8555.1 – Itomia opistographa
- 8556 – Litoprosopus futilis, palmetto borer moth
- 8556.1 – Litoprosopus hatuey
- 8557 – Litoprosopus bahamensis, Bahamian palm owlet moth
- 8558 – Litoprosopus coachella, palm flower moth
- 8559 – Litoprosopus confligens
- 8560 – Diphthera festiva, hieroglyphic moth
- no number yet – Xenosoma flaviceps
- 8561 – Janseodes melanospila
- 8562 – Concana mundissima
- 8563 – Lygephila victoria
- 8564 – Herminocala stigmaphiles
- 8565 – Obrima rinconada
- 8565.1 – Obrima pyraloides
- 8566 – Bandelia angulata
- 8567 – Euaontia semirufa
- 8568 – Euaontia clarki
- 8569.1 – Eulepidotis addens
- 8570 – Eulepidotis metamorpha
- 8570.1 – Eulepidotis rectimargo
- 8570.2 – Eulepidotis electa
- 8571 – Eulepidotis micca
- 8571.1 – Eulepidotis striaepuncta
- 8573 – Metallata absumens, variable metallata moth
- 8573.1 – Renodes curviluna
- 8574 – Anticarsia gemmatalis, velvetbean caterpillar moth
- 8575 – Azeta repugnalis
- 8576 – Azeta schausi
- 8577 – Antiblemma rufinans
- 8578 – Antiblemma filaria
- 8579 – Antiblemma concinnula
- 8580 – Goniocarsia electrica
- 8581 – Epitausa prona
- 8581.1 – Epitausa coppryi
- 8582 – Ephyrodes cacata
- 8583 – Athyrma adjutrix
- 8583.1 – Athyrma ganglio
- 8584 – Syllectra erycata
- 8585 – Epidromia lienaris
- 8585.2 – Epidromia pannosa
- 8585.3 – Epidromia rotundata
- 8585.4 – Manbuta pyraliformis
- 8586 – Massala obvertens
- 8587 – Panopoda rufimargo, red-lined panopoda moth
- 8588 – Panopoda carneicosta, brown panopoda moth
- 8589 – Panopoda repanda, orange panopoda moth
- 8590 – Panopoda rigida
- 8590.1 – Baniana minor
- 8590.2 – Deinopa angitia
- 8591 – Phoberia atomaris, common oak moth
- 8591.1 – Phoberia ingenua
- 8592 – Cissusa spadix, black-dotted brown moth
- 8593 – Cissusa mucronata
- 8594 – Cissusa indiscreta, indiscrete cissusa moth
- 8596 – Cissusa valens, vigorous cissusa moth
- 8597 – Litocala sexsignata, litocala moth
- 8598 – Melipotis perpendicularis
- 8599 – Melipotis fasciolaris, fasciolated melipotis moth
- 8600 – Melipotis indomita, indomitable melipotis moth
- 8601 – Melipotis cellaris, cellar melipotis moth
- 8602 – Melipotis nigrobasis
- 8603 – Melipotis januaris, January melipotis moth
- 8604 – Melipotis famelica
- 8605 – Melipotis contorta
- 8606 – Melipotis prolata, prolata melipotis moth
- 8607 – Melipotis jucunda, merry melipotis moth
- 8608 – Melipotis agrotoides
- 8609 – Melipotis novanda
- 8610 – Melipotis acontioides, royal poinciana moth
- 8611 – Ianius mosca
- 8612 – Panula inconstans
- 8613 – Forsebia perlaeta, forsebia moth
- 8614 – Bulia deducta
- 8615 – Bulia similaris
- 8615.1 – Bulia schausi
- 8616 – Drasteria mirifica
- 8616.1 – Drasteria hastingsii
- 8617 – Drasteria eubapta
- 8618 – Drasteria graphica, graphic moth
- 8619 – Drasteria occulta, occult drasteria moth
- 8620 – Drasteria ingeniculata
- 8621 – Drasteria scrupulosa
- 8622 – Drasteria inepta, inept drasteria moth
- 8623 – Drasteria sabulosa
- 8625 – Drasteria biformata
- 8626 – Drasteria ochracea
- 8627 – Drasteria edwardsii
- 8628 – Drasteria pallescens
- 8629 – Drasteria fumosa, smoky arches moth
- 8630 – Drasteria divergens
- 8630.1 – Drasteria convergens
- 8630.2 – Drasteria walshi
- 8631 – Drasteria petricola, little arches moth
- 8632 – Drasteria hudsonica, northern arches moth
- 8633 – Drasteria nubicola
- 8634 – Drasteria maculosa
- 8635 – Drasteria perplexa, perplexed arches moth
- 8636 – Drasteria adumbrata, shadowy arches moth
- 8637 – Drasteria stretchii
- 8638 – Drasteria pulchra
- 8639 – Drasteria howlandii
- 8640 – Drasteria tejonica
- 8641 – Drasteria grandirena, figure-seven moth
- no number yet – Drasteria parallela
- 8642 – Hypocala andremona, hypocala moth
- 8643 – Boryzops purissima
- 8644 – Orodesma apicina
- 8645 – Hemeroblemma opigena
- no number yet – Hemeroblemma mexicana
- 8646 – Latebraria amphipyroides
- 8646.1 – Letis xylia
- 8647 – Thysania zenobia, owl moth
- 8649 – Ascalapha odorata, black witch moth
- 8650 – Tyrissa multilinea
- 8651 – Lesmone detrahens, detracted owlet moth
- 8652 – Lesmone fufius
- 8653 – Lesmone hinna
- 8654 – Lesmone griseipennis, gray-winged owlet moth
- 8655 – Lesmone formularis
- 8656 – Bendisodes aeolia
- 8657 – Helia agna
- 8658 – Selenisa sueroides, pale-edged selenisa moth
- 8659 – Heteranassa mima
- 8661 – Heteranassa fraterna
- 8661.1 – Elousa albicans
- 8662 – Coxina cinctipalpis
- 8662.1 – Coxina hadenioides
- 8663 – Euclystis sytis
- 8664 – Euclystis guerini
- 8664.1 – Euclystis insana
- 8665 – Coenipeta bibitrix
- 8665.1 – Coenipeta medina
- 8666 – Metria amella, live oak metria moth
- 8667 – Metria bilineata
- 8668 – Metria celia
- 8669 – Kakopoda progenies
- 8670 – Toxonprucha pardalis, spotted toxonprucha moth
- 8671 – Toxonprucha strigalis
- 8672 – Toxonprucha volucris
- 8673 – Toxonprucha repentis
- 8673.1 – Toxonprucha diffundens
- 8674 – Toxonprucha crudelis, cruel toxonprucha moth
- 8675 – Toxonprucha clientis
- 8676 – Toxonprucha psegmapteryx
- 8677 – Zaleops umbrina
- 8678 – Zaleops paresa
- 8679 – Matigramma pulverilinea, dusty lined matigramma moth
- 8680 – Matigramma rubrosuffusa
- 8680.1 – Matigramma inopinata
- 8680.2 – Matigramma emmilta
- 8680.3 – Matigramma adoceta
- 8681 – Matigramma obscurior
- 8681.1 – Matigramma repentina
- 8682 – Acritogramma metaleuca
- 8682.1 – Acritogramma noctar
- 8683 – Pseudanthracia coracias, pseudanthracia moth
- 8684 – Zale exhausta
- 8684.1 – Zale peruncta
- 8685 – Zale viridans
- 8686 – Zale strigimacula
- 8686.1 – Zale obsita
- 8687 – Zale fictilis
- 8688 – Zale sabena
- 8689 – Zale lunata, lunate zale moth
- 8690 – Zale smithi
- 8691 – Zale declarans
- 8692 – Zale galbanata, maple zale moth
- 8693 – Zale edusina
- 8693.1 – Zale chisosensis
- 8694 – Zale aeruginosa, green-dusted zale moth
- 8695 – Zale undularis, black zale moth
- 8696 – Zale insuda
- 8697 – Zale minerea, colorful zale moth
- 8698 – Zale phaeocapna
- 8699 – Zale obliqua, oblique zale moth
- 8700 – Zale squamularis, gray-banded zale moth
- 8701 – Zale confusa
- 8702 – Zale submediana
- 8703 – Zale duplicata, pine false looper moth
- 8704 – Zale helata, brown-spotted zale moth
- 8705 – Zale bethunei, Bethune's zale moth
- 8706 – Zale buchholzi
- 8707 – Zale metatoides, washed-out zale moth
- 8708 – Zale metata
- 8709 – Zale curema, black-eyed zale moth
- 8710 – Zale rubiata
- 8711 – Zale rubi
- 8712 – Zale termina
- 8713 – Zale lunifera, bold-based zale moth
- 8713.1 – Zale intenta
- 8714 – Zale calycanthata, double-banded zale moth
- 8715 – Zale colorado
- 8716 – Zale unilineata, one-lined zale moth
- 8717 – Zale horrida, horrid zale moth
- 8718 – Zale perculta, Okefenokee zale moth
- 8719 – Euparthenos nubilis, locust underwing moth
- 8720 – Eubolina impartialis, eubolina moth
- 8721 – Allotria elonympha, false underwing moth
- 8722 – Ophisma tropicalis
- 8723 – Mimophisma delunaris
- 8723.1 – Achaea ablunaris
- 8724 – Neadysgonia consobrina, consobrina darkwing moth
- 8725 – Neadysgonia similis
- 8726 – Neadysgonia smithii, Smith's darkwing moth
- 8726.1 – Neadysgonia telma
- 8727 – Parallelia bistriaris, maple looper moth
- 8728 – Cutina albopunctella
- 8729 – Cutina distincta, distinguished cypress owlet moth
- 8729.1 – Cutina aluticolor
- 8729.2 – Cutina arcuata
- 8730 – Focillidia texana
- 8730.1 – Focillidia grenadensis
- 8731 – Euclidia cuspidea, toothed somberwing moth
- 8732 – Euclidia ardita
- 8733 – Caenurgia chloropha, vetch looper moth
- 8734 – Caenurgia togataria
- 8735 – Caenurgina annexa
- 8736 – Caenurgina caerulea
- 8738 – Caenurgina crassiuscula, clover looper moth
- 8739 – Caenurgina erechtea, forage looper moth
- 8740 – Callistege intercalaris
- 8741 – Callistege diagonalis
- 8742 – Callistege triangula
- 8743 – Mocis latipes, small mocis moth
- 8744 – Mocis marcida, withered mocis moth
- 8745 – Mocis texana, Texas mocis moth
- 8746 – Mocis disseverans, yellow mocis moth
- 8746.1 – Mocis cubana
- 8747 – Celiptera frustulum, black bit moth
- 8748 – Celiptera valina
- 8749 – Ptichodis vinculum, black-tipped ptichodis moth
- 8750 – Ptichodis herbarum, common ptichodis moth
- 8750.1 – Ptichodis immunis
- 8751 – Ptichodis bistrigata, southern ptichodis moth
- 8752 – Ptichodis pacalis
- 8753 – Ptichodis ovalis
- 8754 – Ptichodis bucetum
- 8755 – Argyrostrotis herbicola
- 8756 – Argyrostrotis contempta
- 8757 – Argyrostrotis diffundens
- 8758 – Argyrostrotis carolina, Carolina chocolate moth
- 8759 – Argyrostrotis flavistriaria, yellow-lined chocolate moth
- 8760 – Argyrostrotis sylvarum, woodland chocolate moth
- 8761 – Argyrostrotis erasa, erasa chocolate moth
- 8762 – Argyrostrotis quadrifilaris, four-lined chocolate moth
- 8763 – Argyrostrotis deleta
- 8764 – Argyrostrotis anilis, short-lined chocolate moth
- 8765 – Doryodes bistrialis, double-lined doryodes moth
- 8766 – Doryodes grandipennis
- 8767 – Doryodes spadaria, dull doryodes moth
- 8768 – Doryodes tenuistriga
- 8769 – Spiloloma lunilinea, moon-lined moth
- no number yet – Gonodontodes dispar
- 8770 – Catocala innubens, betrothed underwing moth
- 8771 – Catocala piatrix, penitent underwing moth
- 8772 – Catocala consors, consort underwing moth
- 8773 – Catocala epione, Epione underwing moth
- 8774 – Catocala muliercula, little wife underwing moth
- 8775 – Catocala antinympha, sweetfern underwing moth
- 8777 – Catocala badia, bay underwing moth
- 8778 – Catocala habilis, habilis underwing moth
- 8779 – Catocala serena, serene underwing moth
- 8780 – Catocala robinsonii, Robinson's underwing moth
- 8781 – Catocala judith, Judith's underwing moth
- 8782 – Catocala flebilis, mourning underwing moth
- 8783 – Catocala angusi, Angus' underwing moth
- 8784 – Catocala obscura, obscure underwing moth
- 8785 – Catocala residua, residua underwing moth
- 8786 – Catocala sappho, sappho underwing moth
- 8787 – Catocala agrippina, Agrippina underwing moth
- 8787.1 – Catocala atocala, Brou's underwing moth
- 8788 – Catocala retecta, yellow-gray underwing moth
- 8788.1 – Catocala luctuosa, Hulst's underwing moth
- 8789 – Catocala ulalume, Ulalume underwing moth
- 8790 – Catocala dejecta, dejected underwing moth
- 8791 – Catocala insolabilis, inconsolable underwing moth
- 8792 – Catocala vidua, widow underwing moth
- 8793 – Catocala maestosa, sad underwing moth
- 8794 – Catocala lacrymosa, tearful underwing moth
- 8795 – Catocala palaeogama, oldwife underwing moth
- 8796 – Catocala nebulosa, clouded underwing moth
- 8797 – Catocala subnata, youthful underwing moth
- 8798 – Catocala neogama, bride underwing moth
- 8800 – Catocala aholibah, Aholibah underwing moth
- 8801 – Catocala ilia, ilia underwing moth
- 8801.1 – Catocala umbrosa, umber underwing moth
- 8802 – Catocala cerogama, yellow-banded underwing moth
- 8803 – Catocala relicta, white underwing moth
- 8804 – Catocala marmorata, marbled underwing moth
- 8805 – Catocala unijuga, once-married underwing moth
- 8806 – Catocala parta, mother underwing moth
- 8807 – Catocala irene
- 8808 – Catocala luciana, Luciana underwing moth
- 8811 – Catocala faustina
- 8812 – Catocala hermia
- 8814 – Catocala californica
- 8817 – Catocala briseis, briseis underwing moth
- 8818 – Catocala grotiana
- 8821 – Catocala semirelicta, semirelict underwing moth
- 8822 – Catocala meskei, Meske's underwing moth
- 8825 – Catocala jessica, Jessica underwing moth
- 8829 – Catocala junctura, joined underwing moth
- 8830 – Catocala texanae
- 8831 – Catocala electilis
- 8832 – Catocala cara, darling underwing moth
- 8832.1 – Catocala carissima, carissima underwing moth
- 8833 – Catocala concumbens, pink underwing moth
- 8834 – Catocala amatrix, sweetheart underwing moth
- 8835 – Catocala delilah, Delilah underwing moth
- 8835.1 – Catocala desdemona
- 8835.2 – Catocala caesia
- 8836 – Catocala andromache, andromache underwing moth
- 8837 – Catocala frederici
- 8837.1 – Catocala benjamini
- 8838 – Catocala chelidonia
- 8839 – Catocala mcdunnoughi
- 8840 – Catocala illecta, Magdalen underwing moth
- 8841 – Catocala abbreviatella, abbreviated underwing moth
- 8842 – Catocala nuptialis, married underwing moth
- 8843 – Catocala whitneyi, Whitney's underwing moth
- 8844 – Catocala amestris, three-staff underwing moth
- 8845 – Catocala messalina, Messalina underwing moth
- 8846 – Catocala sordida, sordid underwing moth
- 8847 – Catocala gracilis, graceful underwing moth
- 8848 – Catocala louiseae, Louise's underwing moth
- 8849 – Catocala andromedae, Andromeda underwing moth
- 8850 – Catocala herodias, Herodias underwing moth
- 8851 – Catocala coccinata, scarlet underwing moth
- 8852 – Catocala verrilliana
- 8853 – Catocala violenta
- 8854 – Catocala ophelia
- 8855 – Catocala miranda, Miranda underwing moth
- 8856 – Catocala orba, orb underwing moth
- 8857 – Catocala ultronia, ultronia underwing moth
- 8858 – Catocala crataegi, hawthorn underwing moth
- 8858.1 – Catocala pretiosa
- 8860 – Catocala lincolnana, Lincoln underwing moth
- 8861 – Catocala johnsoniana
- 8862 – Catocala californiensis
- 8863 – Catocala mira, wonderful underwing moth
- 8864 – Catocala grynea, woody underwing moth
- 8865 – Catocala praeclara, praeclara underwing moth
- 8867 – Catocala blandula, charming underwing moth
- 8869 – Catocala alabamae, Alabama underwing moth
- 8871 – Catocala dulciola, sweet underwing moth
- 8872 – Catocala clintonii, Clinton's underwing moth
- 8873 – Catocala similis, similar underwing moth
- 8874 – Catocala minuta, little underwing moth
- 8875 – Catocala grisatra, grisatra underwing moth
- 8876 – Catocala micronympha, little nymph underwing moth
- 8877 – Catocala connubialis, connubial underwing moth
- 8878 – Catocala amica, girlfriend underwing moth
- 8878.1 – Catocala lineella, little lined underwing moth
- 8879 – Catocala jair, Jair underwing moth
- 8880 – Abrostola ovalis, oval abrostola moth
- 8881 – Abrostola urentis, spectacled nettle moth
- 8882 – Abrostola parvula
- 8883 – Abrostola microvalis, minute oval abrostola moth
- 8884 – Mouralia tinctoides
- 8885 – Argyrogramma verruca, golden looper moth
- no number yet – Enigmogramma antillea
- 8886 – Enigmogramma basigera, pink-washed looper moth
- 8887 – Trichoplusia ni, cabbage looper moth
- 8889 – Ctenoplusia oxygramma, sharp-stigma looper moth
- 8890 – Chrysodeixis includens, soybean looper moth
- 8890.1 – Chrysodeixis chalcites
- 8891 – Autoplusia egena, bean-lead skeletonizer moth
- 8892 – Autoplusia olivacea
- 8893 – Autoplusia egenoides
- 8894 – Notioplusia illustrata, notioplusia moth
- 8895 – Rachiplusia ou, gray looper moth
- 8896 – Diachrysia aereoides, dark-spotted looper moth
- 8897 – Diachrysia balluca, green-patched looper moth
- 8898 – Allagrapha aerea, unspotted looper moth
- 8899 – Pseudeva purpurigera, straight-lined looper moth
- 8900 – Pseudeva palligera
- 8901 – Polychrysia esmeralda
- 8902 – Polychrysia morigera
- 8902.1 – Euchalcia borealis
- 8903 – Euchalcia albavitta
- 8904 – Chrysanympha formosa, Formosa looper moth
- 8905 – Eosphoropteryx thyatyroides, pink-patched looper moth
- 8907 – Megalographa biloba, bilobed looper moth
- 8908 – Autographa precationis, common looper moth
- 8909 – Autographa rubidus
- 8910 – Autographa sansoni
- 8911 – Autographa bimaculata, two-spotted looper moth
- 8912 – Autographa mappa, wavy chestnut Y moth
- 8913 – Autographa pseudogamma
- 8913.1 – Autographa buraetica
- 8914 – Autographa californica, alfalfa looper moth
- 8914.1 – Autographa gamma
- 8915 – Autographa pasiphaeia
- 8916 – Autographa flagellum
- 8917 – Autographa metallica
- 8918 – Autographa corusca
- 8919 – Autographa speciosa
- 8919.1 – Autographa flavida
- 8920 – Autographa labrosa
- 8921 – Autographa v-alba
- 8922 – Syngrapha ottolenguii
- 8923 – Autographa ampla, large looper moth
- 8924 – Anagrapha falcifera, celery looper moth
- 8925 – Syngrapha altera
- 8926 – Syngrapha octoscripta, dusky silver Y moth
- 8927 – Syngrapha epigaea, epigaea looper moth
- 8928 – Syngrapha selecta
- 8929 – Syngrapha viridisigma, spruce false looper moth
- 8930 – Syngrapha orophila
- 8932 – Syngrapha sackenii
- 8934 – Syngrapha borea
- 8935 – Syngrapha diasema
- 8936 – Syngrapha u-aureum
- 8937 – Syngrapha interrogationis
- 8938 – Syngrapha surena
- 8939 – Syngrapha alias
- 8940 – Syngrapha abstrusa
- 8941 – Syngrapha cryptica
- 8942 – Syngrapha rectangula, salt-and-pepper looper moth
- 8943 – Syngrapha angulidens
- 8944 – Syngrapha celsa
- 8945 – Syngrapha montana
- 8946 – Syngrapha microgamma
- 8947 – Syngrapha alticola
- 8948 – Syngrapha parilis
- 8949 – Syngrapha ignea, mountain beauty moth
- 8950 – Plusia putnami, Putnam's looper moth
- 8951 – Plusia nichollae
- 8951.1 – Plusia magnimacula
- 8952 – Plusia contexta, connected looper moth
- 8953 – Plusia venusta, white-streaked looper moth
- 8954 – Aon noctuiformis, aon moth
- 8955 – Marathyssa inficita, dark marathyssa moth
- 8956 – Marathyssa basalis, light marathyssa moth
- 8956.1 – Marathyssa minus
- 8957 – Paectes oculatrix, eyed paectes moth
- 8959 – Paectes pygmaea, pygmy paectes moth
- 8959.1 – Paectes abrostolella
- no number yet – Paectes nana
- no number yet – Paectes asper
- 8961 – Paectes declinata
- 8962 – Paectes abrostoloides, large paectes moth
- 8963 – Paectes delineata
- 8963.1 – Paectes lunodes
- 8964 – Paectes acutangula
- 8965 – Paectes nubifera
- 8967 – Paectes arcigera
- 8968 – Eutelia pulcherrimus, beautiful eutelia moth
- 8968.1 – Eutelia pyrastis
- 8968.2 – Eutelia furcata, Florida eutelia moth
- 8969 – Baileya doubledayi, Doubleday's baileya moth
- 8970 – Baileya ophthalmica, eyed baileya moth
- 8971 – Baileya dormitans, sleeping baileya moth
- 8971.1 – Baileya acadiana
- 8972 – Baileya levitans, pale baileya moth
- 8972.1 – Baileya ellessyoo
- 8973 – Baileya australis, small baileya moth
- 8974 – Garella nilotica, black-olive caterpillar moth
- 8975 – Nycteola frigidana, frigid owlet moth
- 8976 – Nycteola columbiana
- 8977 – Nycteola cinereana
- 8978 – Nycteola metaspilella, forgotten frigid owlet moth
- 8979 – Nycteola fletcheri
- 8980 – Iscadia aperta
- 8981 – Motya abseuzalis
- 8982 – Collomena filifera
- 8983 – Meganola minuscula, confused meganola moth
- 8983.1 – Meganola phylla, coastal plain meganola moth
- 8983.2 – Meganola spodia, ashy meganola moth
- 8984 – Meganola minor
- 8985 – Meganola fuscula
- 8986 – Meganola dentata
- 8987 – Meganola varia
- 8988 – Meganola conspicua
- 8989 – Nola pustulata, sharp-blotched nola moth
- 8990 – Nola cilicoides, blurry-patched nola moth
- 8991 – Nola cereella, sorghum webworm moth
- 8992 – Nola triquetrana, three-spotted nola moth
- 8993 – Nola minna, ceanothus nola moth
- 8994 – Nola aphyla
- 8995 – Nola ovilla
- 8996 – Nola clethrae, sweet pepperbush nola moth
- 8997 – Nola lagunculariae
- 8998 – Nola apera
- 8998.1 – Nola cucullatella
- 8999 – Cydosia aurivitta, straight-lined cydosia moth
- 9000 – Cydosia nobilitella, curve-lined cydosia moth
- 9001 – Cydosia curvinella
- 9002 – Tripudia damozela
- 9002.1 – Tripudia munna
- 9003 – Tripudia quadrifera
- 9003.1 – Tripudia rectangula
- 9004 – Tripudia grapholithoides
- 9004.1 – Tripudia chihuahua
- 9004.2 – Tripudia lamina
- 9005 – Tripudia balteata
- 9006 – Tripudia luda
- 9007 – Tripudia dimidata
- 9008 – Tripudia luxuriosa
- 9009 – Tripudia flavofasciata
- 9010 – Tripudia versutus
- 9010.1 – Tripudia goyanensis
- 9011 – Tripudia limbatus
- no number yet – Tripudia paraplesia
- 9012 – Cobubatha metaspilaris
- 9012.1 – Cobubatha ochrocraspis
- 9013 – Cobubatha numa
- 9014 – Cobubatha lixiva
- 9017 – Cobubatha orthozona
- 9018 – Cobubatha dividua
- 9019 – Cobubatha hippotes
- 9019.1 – Cobubatha ipilla
- 9019.2 – Cobubatha megaplaga
- 9020 – Allerastria albiciliatus
- 9020.1 – Allerastria annae
- 9021 – Exyra fax, epauletted pitcher-plant moth
- 9023 – Exyra ridingsii
- 9024 – Exyra semicrocea
- 9025 – Oruza albocostaliata, white edge moth
- 9026 – Oruza albocostata
- 9027 – Homocerynea cleoriformis
- 9028 – Phoenicophanta bicolor
- 9029 – Phoenicophanta modestula
- 9030 – Ozarba aeria, aerial brown moth
- 9031 – Ozarba propera
- 9032 – Ozarba catilina
- 9033 – Ozarba nebula
- 9034 – Amiana niama
- 9035 – Hyperstrotia nana
- 9036 – Hyperstrotia aetheria
- 9037 – Hyperstrotia pervertens, dotted graylet moth
- 9038 – Hyperstrotia villificans, white-lined graylet moth
- 9039 – Hyperstrotia flaviguttata, yellow-spotted graylet moth
- 9040 – Hyperstrotia secta, black-patched graylet moth
- 9041 – Sexserrata hampsoni
- 9042 – Grotellaforma lactea
- 9043 – Homolagoa grotelliformis
- 9044 – Marimatha nigrofimbria, black-bordered lemon moth
- 9044.1 – Marimatha squala
- 9044.2 – Marimatha quadrata
- 9045 – Marimatha tripuncta
- 9045.1 – Marimatha piscimala
- 9046 – Deltote bellicula, bog lithacodia moth
- 9047 – Protodeltote muscosula, large mossy lithacodia moth
- 9048 – Protodeltote albidula, pale glyph moth
- 9049 – Maliattha synochitis, black-dotted lithacodia moth
- 9050 – Maliattha concinnimacula, red-spotted lithacodia moth
- 9051 – Lithacodia musta, small mossy lithacodia moth
- 9052 – Lithacodia costaricana
- 9053 – Pseudeustrotia carneola, pink-barred lithacodia moth
- 9054 – Pseudeustrotia indeterminata
- 9055 – Lithacodia phya
- 9056 – Homophoberia cristata, waterlily owlet moth
- 9057 – Homophoberia apicosa, black wedge-spot moth
- 9058 – Neotarache deserticola
- 9059 – Capis curvata, curved halter moth
- 9059.1 – Capis archaia
- 9060 – Argillophora furcilla
- 9061 – Cerma cora, owl-eyed bird-dropping moth
- 9062 – Cerma cerintha, tufted bird-dropping moth
- 9063 – Cerma sirius
- 9063.1 – Tyta luctuosa
- 9064 – Cerathosia tricolor
- 9065 – Leuconycta diphteroides, green leuconycta moth
- 9066 – Leuconycta lepidula, marbled-green leuconycta moth
- 9067 – Diastema tigris, lantana moth
- 9068 – Diastema cnossia
- 9069 – Amyna bullula, hook-tipped amyna moth
- 9070 – Amyna axis, eight-spot moth
- no number yet – Amyna amplificans
- 9071 – Aleptina inca
- 9071.1 – Aleptina junctimacula
- 9072 – Aleptina aleptivoides
- 9072.1 – Aleptina clinopetes
- 9073 – Copibryophila angelica
- 9074 – Metaponpneumata rogenhoferi, metaponpneumata moth
- 9075 – Airamia albiocula
- 9076 – Eublemma minima, everlasting bud moth
- 9077 – Eublemma cinnamomea
- 9078 – Eublemma recta, straight-lined seed moth
- 9079 – Eublemma irresoluta
- 9080 – Proroblemma testa
- 9081 – Sigela vilhelmina
- 9082 – Ponometia albitermen
- 9083 – Ponometia parvula
- 9084 – Ponometia bicolorata
- 9085 – Ponometia semiflava, half-yellow moth
- 9085.1 – Ponometia septuosa
- 9086 – Ponometia clausula
- 9087 – Ponometia venustula
- 9088 – Ponometia virginalis
- 9089 – Ponometia binocula, prairie bird-dropping moth
- 9090 – Ponometia candefacta, olive-shaded bird-dropping moth
- 9091 – Ponometia dorneri
- 9092 – Ponometia huita
- 9093 – Ponometia heonyx
- 9094 – Ponometia cuta
- 9095 – Ponometia erastrioides, small bird-dropping moth
- 9096 – Ponometia libedis
- 9097 – Ponometia nannodes
- 9098 – Ponometia phecolisca
- 9099 – Ponometia alata
- 9100 – Ponometia albimargo
- 9101 – Ponometia tortricina
- 9101.1 – Ponometia nigra
- 9101.2 – Ponometia fumata
- 9102 – Ponometia fasciatella
- 9103 – Ponometia hutsoni
- 9104 – Ponometia pulchra
- 9105 – Ponometia acutus
- 9107 – Ponometia altera
- 9109 – Ponometia elegantula, Arizona bird-dropping moth
- 9111 – Tarache augustipennis, narrow-winged midget moth
- 9113 – Tarache huachuca
- 9115 – Ponometia exigua
- 9116 – Ponometia macdunnoughi
- 9117 – Ponometia megocula
- 9118 – Ponometia tripartita
- 9119 – Ponometia sutrix
- 9120 – Tarache idella
- 9121 – Spragueia magnifica
- 9122 – Spragueia dama, southern spragueia moth
- 9123 – Spragueia cleta
- 9124 – Spragueia perstructana
- 9125 – Spragueia guttata, spotted spragueia moth
- 9126 – Spragueia onagrus, black-dotted spragueia moth
- 9127 – Spragueia leo, common spragueia moth
- 9128 – Spragueia jaguaralis
- 9129 – Spragueia funeralis
- 9130 – Spragueia obatra
- 9131 – Spragueia apicalis, yellow spragueia moth
- 9132 – Spragueia margana
- 9133 – Tarache apela
- 9134 – Tarache sutor
- 9135 – Tarache tenuicula
- 9136 – Tarache aprica, exposed bird-dropping moth
- 9137 – Tarache lactipennis
- 9138 – Tarache abdominalis
- 9139 – Tarache knowltoni
- 9140 – Tarache flavipennis
- 9140.1 – Tarache lagunae
- 9141 – Tarache assimilis
- 9142 – Tarache quadriplaga
- 9143 – Tarache tetragona, four-spotted bird-dropping moth
- 9144 – Tarache dacia
- 9145 – Tarache terminimaculata, curve-lined bird-dropping moth
- 9146 – Tarache delecta, delightful bird-dropping moth
- 9147 – Tarache bella
- 9148 – Tarache lucasi
- 9149 – Tarache expolita
- 9150 – Tarache arida
- 9151 – Tarache cora
- 9152 – Tarache major
- 9153 – Tarache lanceolata
- 9154 – Tarache sedata
- 9155 – Tarache acerba
- 9156 – Tarache axendra
- 9157 – Tarache bilimeki
- 9158 – Tarache areloides
- 9159 – Tarache areli
- 9159.1 – Tarache toddi
- 9159.2 – Tarache geminocula
- 9159.3 – Tarache albifusa
- 9160 – Acontia chea
- 9160.1 – Acontia jaliscana
- 9161 – Acontia cretata, chalky bird-dropping moth
- 9163 – Acontia coquillettii
- 9164 – Acontia behrii
- 9165 – Aleptina semiatra
- 9166 – Eusceptis flavifrimbriata
- 9167 – Pseudalypia crotchii
- 9168 – Bagisara repanda, wavy lined mallow moth
- 9169 – Bagisara rectifascia, straight lined mallow moth
- 9170 – Bagisara pacifica
- 9171 – Bagisara demura
- 9172 – Bagisara buxea
- 9173 – Bagisara oula
- 9174 – Bagisara albicosta
- 9175 – Bagisara gulnare
- 9175.1 – Bagisara praecelsa
- 9175.2 – Bagisara laverna
- 9176 – Bagisara tristicta
- 9176.1 – Bagisara brouana
- 9177 – Panthea acronyctoides, black zigzag moth
- 9178 – Panthea virginarius
- 9181 – Panthea gigantea
- 9182 – Panthea furcilla, eastern panthea moth
- 9183.1 – Panthea apanthea
- 9183.2 – Panthea judyae
- 9183.3 – Panthea greyi
- 9184 – Colocasia flavicornis, yellowhorn moth
- 9185 – Colocasia propinquilinea, closebanded yellowhorn moth
- 9186 – Pseudopanthea palata
- 9187 – Lichnoptera decora
- 9188 – Charadra franclemonti
- 9188.1 – Charadra tapa
- 9189 – Charadra deridens, laugher moth
- 9189.1 – Charadra moneta
- 9190 – Charadra dispulsa
- 9191 – Meleneta antennata
- 9192 – Raphia abrupta, abrupt brother moth
- 9193 – Raphia frater, brother moth
- 9194 – Raphia piazzi
- 9196 – Raphia elbea
- 9197 – Raphia pallula
- 9198 – Raphia cinderella
- 9199 – Acronicta rubricoma, ruddy dagger moth
- 9200 – Acronicta americana, American dagger moth
- 9201 – Acronicta hastulifera, frosted dagger moth
- 9202 – Acronicta insita
- 9203 – Acronicta dactylina, fingered dagger moth
- 9205 – Acronicta lepusculina, cottonwood dagger moth
- 9205.1 – Acronicta cyanescens
- 9206 – Acronicta vulpina, miller dagger moth
- 9207 – Acronicta innotata, unmarked dagger moth
- 9208 – Acronicta betulae, birch dagger moth
- 9209 – Acronicta radcliffei, Radcliffe's dagger moth
- 9210 – Acronicta tota
- 9211 – Acronicta tritona, triton dagger moth
- 9212 – Acronicta grisea, gray dagger moth
- 9214 – Acronicta falcula
- 9216 – Acronicta albarufa
- 9217 – Acronicta exempta
- 9219 – Acronicta connecta, connected dagger moth
- 9220 – Acronicta rapidan
- 9221 – Acronicta funeralis, funerary dagger moth
- 9222 – Acronicta paupercula
- 9223 – Acronicta lepetita
- 9224 – Acronicta quadrata
- 9225 – Acronicta vinnula, delightful dagger moth
- 9226 – Acronicta superans, splendid dagger moth
- 9227 – Acronicta laetifica, pleasant dagger moth
- 9229 – Acronicta hasta, speared dagger moth
- 9230 – Acronicta thoracica
- 9231 – Acronicta strigulata
- 9231.1 – Acronicta browni
- 9232 – Acronicta atristrigatus
- 9234 – Acronicta beameri
- 9235 – Acronicta spinigera, nondescript dagger moth
- 9236 – Acronicta morula, ochre dagger moth
- 9237 – Acronicta interrupta, interrupted dagger moth
- 9238 – Acronicta lobeliae, greater oak dagger moth
- 9238.1 – Acronicta perblanda
- 9239 – Acronicta valliscola
- 9241 – Acronicta fragilis, fragile dagger moth
- 9241.1 – Acronicta heitzmani, Heitzman's dagger moth
- 9242 – Acronicta exilis, exiled dagger moth
- 9243 – Acronicta ovata, ovate dagger moth
- 9244 – Acronicta modica, medium dagger moth
- 9245 – Acronicta haesitata, hesitant dagger moth
- 9246 – Acronicta clarescens, clear dagger moth
- 9247 – Acronicta tristis
- 9248 – Acronicta hamamelis, witch hazel dagger moth
- 9249 – Acronicta increta, southern oak dagger moth
- 9250 – Acronicta inclara, unclear dagger moth
- 9251 – Acronicta retardata, retarded dagger moth
- 9254 – Acronicta afflicta, afflicted dagger moth
- 9255 – Acronicta brumosa, charred dagger moth
- 9256 – Acronicta marmorata, marble dagger moth
- 9257 – Acronicta impleta, yellow-haired dagger moth
- 9258 – Acronicta sperata
- 9259 – Acronicta noctivaga, night-wandering dagger moth
- 9261 – Acronicta impressa, impressed dagger moth
- 9264 – Acronicta longa, long-winged dagger moth
- 9265 – Acronicta extricata
- 9266 – Acronicta lithospila, streaked dagger moth
- 9267 – Acronicta barnesii
- 9268 – Acronicta perdita
- 9269 – Acronicta edolata
- 9270 – Acronicta othello
- 9272 – Acronicta oblinita, smeared dagger moth
- 9272.1 – Acronicta sinescripta
- 9273 – Acronicta sagittata
- 9274 – Acronicta lanceolaria
- 9275 – Acronicta lupini
- 9275.1 – Acronicta australis
- 9276 – Acronicta spinea
- 9277 – Acronicta dolli
- 9280 – Simyra insularis, Henry's marsh moth
- 9281 – Agriopodes fallax, green marvel moth
- 9282 – Agriopodes geminata
- 9283 – Agriopodes tybo
- 9284 – Anterastria teratophora, gray marvel moth
- 9285 – Polygrammate hebraeicum, Hebrew moth
- 9286 – Harrisimemna trisignata, Harris's three-spot moth
- 9287 – Cryphia olivacea
- 9288 – Cryphia fascia
- 9289 – Cryphia flavidior
- 9290 – Cryphia oaklandiae
- 9291 – Cryphia nana
- 9292 – Cryphia cuerva, cryphia moth
- 9293 – Cryphia pallidioides
- 9295 – Cryphia sarepta
- 9296 – Bryolymnia viridata
- 9297 – Cryphia albipuncta
- 9297.1 – Cryphia flavipuncta
- 9297.2 – Elaphria cyanympha
- 9297.5 – Pseudomarimatha flava
- 9298 – Xerociris wilsonii, Wilson's wood-nymph moth
- 9299 – Eudryas unio, pearly wood-nymph moth
- 9300 – Eudryas brevipennis
- 9301 – Eudryas grata, beautiful wood-nymph moth
- 9302 – Gerra radicalis
- 9303 – Gerra sevorsa
- 9304 – Gerrodes minatea
- 9305 – Neotuerta hemicycla
- 9306 – Caularis lunata
- 9307 – Euscirrhopterus gloveri, purslane moth
- 9307.1 – Euscirrhopterus poeyi, pullback moth
- 9308 – Euscirrhopterus cosyra, staghorn cholla moth
- 9309 – Psychomorpha epimenis, grapevine epimenis moth
- 9311 – Eupseudomorpha brillians
- 9312 – Alypiodes bimaculata, two-spotted forester moth
- 9313 – Alypiodes geronimo
- 9314 – Alypia octomaculata, eight-spotted forester moth
- 9316 – Alypia wittfeldii, Wittfeld's forester moth
- 9318 – Alypia langtoni, Langton's forester moth
- 9319 – Alypia ridingsii, Ridings' forester moth
- 9320 – Alypia mariposa
- 9321 – Androloma maccullochii, MacCulloch's forester moth
- 9322 – Androloma disparata
- 9325 – Apamea cuculliformis
- 9326 – Apamea verbascoides
- 9327 – Apamea inebriata
- 9328 – Apamea nigrior, black-dashed apamea moth
- 9329 – Apamea cariosa
- 9329.1 – Apamea quinteri
- 9331 – Apamea cristata
- 9332 – Apamea vulgaris, common apamea moth
- 9332.1 – Apamea wikeri
- 9333 – Apamea lignicolora, wood-colored apamea moth
- 9333.1 – Apamea atriclava
- 9334 – Apamea antennata
- 9334.1 – Apamea siskiyou
- 9336 – Apamea atrosuffusa
- 9337 – Apamea maxima
- 9337.1 – Apamea robertsoni
- 9338 – Apamea acera
- 9339 – Apamea auranticolor
- 9339.1 – Apamea sora
- 9339.2 – Apamea tahoensis
- 9340 – Apamea genialis
- 9341 – Apamea vultuosa, airy apamea moth
- 9343 – Apamea apamiformis, rice worm moth
- 9344 – Apamea plutonia, dusky apamea moth
- 9345 – Apamea perpensa
- 9346 – Apamea occidens, western apamea moth
- 9347 – Apamea albina
- 9348 – Apamea amputatrix, yellow-headed cutworm moth
- 9348.1 – Apamea walshi
- 9350 – Apamea smythi
- 9351 – Apamea alia
- 9351.1 – Apamea xylodes
- 9353 – Apamea inordinata
- 9354 – Apamea centralis
- 9355 – Apamea unita
- 9356 – Apamea spaldingi
- 9357 – Apamea cinefacta
- 9359 – Apamea commoda
- 9360 – Apamea impulsa
- 9361 – Melanapamea mixta
- 9362 – Apamea indocilis, ignorant apamea moth
- 9362.1 – Apamea remissa
- 9362.2 – Apamea unanimis, small clouded brindle moth
- 9364 – Apamea sordens, bordered apamea moth
- 9364.1 – Apamea digitula
- 9365 – Apamea scoparia
- 9367 – Apamea dubitans, doubtful apamea moth
- 9367.1 – Apamea cogitata, thoughtful apamea moth
- 9368 – Apamea geminimacula
- 9369 – Apamea inficita, lined Quaker moth
- 9372 – Apamea lutosa
- 9372.1 – Apamea fergusoni
- 9373 – Apamea helva, yellow three-spot moth
- 9374 – Apamea niveivenosa, snowy-veined apamea moth
- 9378 – Apamea burgessi
- 9380 – Apamea relicina
- 9382 – Apamea devastator, glassy cutworm moth
- 9383 – Apamea longula
- 9383.1 – Apamea bernardino
- 9384.1 – Apamea alticola
- 9384.2 – Apamea rubrirena
- 9385 – Apamea zeta
- 9385.1 – Lateroligia ophiogramma, double lobed moth
- 9386 – Resapamea trigona
- 9387 – Resapamea innota
- 9388 – Resapamea venosa
- 9389 – Resapamea enargia
- 9391 – Resapamea passer, dock rustic moth
- 9393 – Resapamea stipata, four-lined borer moth
- no number yet – Resapamea diluvius
- no number yet – Resapamea angelika
- no number yet – Resapamea mammuthus
- 9394 – Apamea contradicta
- 9395 – Apamea lintneri, sand wainscot moth
- 9396 – Eremobina claudens, dark-winged Quaker moth
- 9398 – Eremobina leucoscelis
- 9399 – Eremobina unicincta
- 9401 – Xylomoia indirecta, oblique brocade moth
- 9402 – Oligia chlorostigma
- 9403 – Aseptis marina
- 9404 – Oligia modica, black-banded brocade moth
- 9405 – Oligia tusa
- 9406 – Mesapamea fractilinea, broken-lined brocade moth
- 9407 – Mesapamea arbora
- 9408 – Neoligia exhausta, exhausted brocade moth
- 9410 – Neoligia crytora
- 9411 – Neoligia semicana
- 9411.1 – Neoligia canadensis
- 9411.2 – Neoligia atlantica
- 9412 – Neoligia subjuncta
- 9412.1 – Neoligia inermis
- 9412.2 – Neoligia pagosa
- 9412.3 – Neoligia hardwicki
- 9412.4 – Neoligia surdirena
- 9413 – Neoligia tonsa
- 9413.1 – Neoligia rubirena
- 9413.2 – Neoligia invenusta
- 9413.3 – Neoligia elephas
- 9413.4 – Neoligia albirena
- 9413.5 – Neoligia lancea
- 9413.6 – Neoligia lillooet
- 9414 – Oligia violacea
- 9414.1 – Oligia rampartensis
- 9415 – Oligia bridghamii, Bridgham's brocade moth
- 9415.1 – Oligia strigilis, marbled minor moth
- 9415.2 – Oligia latruncula
- 9416 – Oligia minuscula, small brocade moth
- 9417 – Oligia egens, Neumogen's Quaker moth
- 9418 – Oligia obtusa
- 9419 – Platypolia mactata, adorable brocade moth
- 9420 – Fishia illocata, wandering brocade moth
- 9421 – Euros cervina
- 9421.1 – Euros osticollis
- 9422 – Euros proprius
- 9423 – Cobalos angelicus
- 9424 – Cobalos franciscanus
- 9425 – Meropleon cosmion
- 9425.1 – Meropleon cinnamicolor
- 9425.2 – Meropleon linae
- 9426 – Meropleon titan
- 9427 – Meropleon diversicolor, multicolored sedgeminer moth
- 9428 – Meropleon ambifusca
- 9429 – Lemmeria digitalis, fingered lemmeria moth
- 9430 – Selicanis cinereola, selicanis moth
- 9431 – Parastichtis suspecta
- 9432 – Photedes didonea
- 9433 – Xylomoia chagnoni
- 9433.1 – Orthomoia bloomfieldi
- 9434 – Photedes includens, included cordgrass borer moth
- 9434.1 – Photedes carterae
- 9435 – Photedes inops
- 9436 – Photedes panatela, northern cordgrass borer moth
- 9437 – Hypocoena inquinata
- 9437.1 – Hypocoena sofiae
- 9439 – Hypocoena basistriga
- 9440 – Hypocoena rufostrigata
- 9440.1 – Hypocoena stigmatica
- 9441 – Photedes enervata
- 9443 – Photedes defecta
- 9444 – Franclemontia interrogans
- 9445 – Benjaminiola colorada
- 9446 – Mammifrontia leucania
- 9447 – Mammifrontia rileyi
- 9447.1 – Mammifrontia sarae
- 9447.2 – Rhizedra lutosa, large wainscot moth
- 9448 – Capsula alameda
- 9449 – Capsula oblonga, oblong sedge borer moth
- 9450 – Capsula subflava, subflava sedge borer moth
- 9451 – Capsula laeta
- 9452 – Macronoctua onusta, iris borer moth
- 9453 – Helotropha reniformis, reniform celaena moth
- no number yet – Cherokeea attakullakulla
- 9454 – Loscopia velata, veiled ear moth
- 9454.1 – Loscopia roblei
- 9454.2 – Protapamea danieli
- 9454.3 – Protapamea louisae
- 9455 – Amphipoea lunata
- 9456 – Amphipoea interoceanica, interoceanic ear moth
- 9457 – Amphipoea americana, American ear moth
- 9457.1 – Amphipoea pacifica
- 9458 – Amphipoea cottlei
- 9459 – Amphipoea senilis
- 9460 – Amphipoea keiferi
- 9461 – Amphipoea erepta
- 9463 – Parapamea buffaloensis, buffalo moth
- 9464 – Papaipema cerina, golden borer moth
- 9465 – Papaipema duovata, seaside goldenrod borer moth
- 9466 – Papaipema cataphracta, burdock borer moth
- 9467 – Papaipema sulphurata, water willow stem borer moth
- 9468 – Papaipema aerata
- 9469 – Papaipema polymniae, cup plant borer moth
- 9470 – Papaipema araliae, aralia shoot borer moth
- 9471 – Papaipema arctivorens, northern burdock borer moth
- 9472 – Papaipema harrisii, heracleum stem borer moth
- 9473 – Papaipema impecuniosa, aster borer moth
- 9474 – Papaipema sauzalitae, figwort stem borer moth
- 9475 – Papaipema angelica, angelica borer moth
- 9476 – Papaipema verona, Verona borer moth
- 9477 – Papaipema astuta, yellow stoneroot borer moth
- 9478 – Papaipema leucostigma, columbine borer moth
- 9479 – Papaipema lysimachiae, loosestrife borer moth
- 9480 – Papaipema pterisii, bracken borer moth
- 9481 – Papaipema stenocelis, chain fern borer moth
- 9482 – Papaipema speciosissima, osmunda borer moth
- 9483 – Papaipema inquaesita, sensitive fern borer moth
- 9484 – Papaipema rutila, mayapple borer moth
- 9485 – Papaipema baptisiae, indigo stem borer moth
- 9485.1 – Papaipema limata
- 9486 – Papaipema birdi, umbellifer borer moth
- 9487 – Papaipema pertincta, groundsel borer moth
- 9488 – Papaipema insulidens, ragwort stem borer moth
- 9489 – Papaipema dribi, rare borer moth
- 9490 – Papaipema nepheleptena, turtle head borer moth
- 9491 – Papaipema circumlucens, hop stalk borer moth
- 9492 – Papaipema marginidens, brick-red borer moth
- 9493 – Papaipema appassionata, pitcher-plant borer moth
- 9494 – Papaipema eryngii, rattlesnake-master borer moth
- 9495 – Papaipema furcata, ash tip borer moth
- 9496 – Papaipema nebris, stalk borer moth
- 9497 – Papaipema necopina, sunflower borer moth
- 9498 – Papaipema silphii, silphius borer moth
- 9499 – Papaipema duplicatus, dark stoneroot borer moth
- 9500 – Papaipema maritima, maritime sunflower borer moth
- 9501 – Papaipema eupatorii, eupatorium borer moth
- 9502 – Papaipema nelita, coneflower borer moth
- 9503 – Papaipema rigida, rigid sunflower borer moth
- 9504 – Papaipema aweme, awame borer moth
- 9505 – Papaipema cerussata, ironweed borer moth
- 9506 – Papaipema sciata, Culver's root borer moth
- 9507 – Papaipema limpida, vernonia borer moth
- 9508 – Papaipema beeriana, blazing star borer moth
- 9509 – Papaipema unimoda, meadow rue borer moth
- 9510 – Hydraecia pallescens
- 9511 – Hydraecia medialis
- 9512 – Hydraecia obliqua
- 9513 – Hydraecia immanis, hop vine borer moth
- 9514 – Hydraecia micacea, rosy rustic moth
- 9515 – Hydraecia perobliqua
- 9516 – Hydraecia stramentosa
- 9517 – Hydraecia intermedia
- 9518 – Hydraecia ximena
- 9519 – Hydraecia columbia
- 9520 – Achatodes zeae, elder shoot borer moth
- 9520.1 – Acrapex relicta
- 9521 – Peraniana dissociata
- 9522 – Iodopepla u-album, white-eyed borer moth
- 9522.1 – Alastria chico
- 9523 – Bellura gortynoides, white-tailed diver moth
- 9523.1 – Bellura vulnifica
- 9524 – Bellura brehmei
- 9525 – Bellura obliqua, cattail borer moth
- 9525.1 – Bellura anoa
- 9526 – Bellura densa, pickerelweed borer moth
- 9527 – Aseptis fumosa
- 9528 – Aseptis catalina
- 9529 – Aseptis perfumosa
- 9529.1 – Aseptis pseudolichena
- 9530 – Aseptis fumeola
- 9531 – Aseptis ethnica
- 9531.1 – Aseptis fanatica (misspelled as Aseptis fannatica)
- 9531.2 – Aseptis ferruginea
- 9531.3 – Aseptis murina
- 9532 – Aseptis binotata
- 9533 – Aseptis adnixa
- 9534 – Aseptis paviae
- 9535 – Aseptis pausis
- 9536 – Aseptis genetrix
- 9537 – Aseptis dilara
- 9538 – Aseptis cara
- 9539 – Aseptis susquesa
- 9540 – Aseptis monica
- 9541 – Aseptis serrula
- 9541.1 – Aseptis torreyana
- 9542 – Aseptis bultata
- 9543 – Aseptis characta
- 9544 – Euplexia triplaga
- 9545 – Euplexia benesimilis, American angle shades moth
- 9546 – Phlogophora iris, olive angle shades moth
- 9547 – Phlogophora periculosa, brown angle shades moth
- 9548 – Conservula anodonta, sharp angle shades moth
- 9549 – Enargia decolor, pale enargia moth
- 9550 – Enargia infumata, smoked sallow moth
- 9550.2 – Enargia fausta
- 9552 – Ipimorpha nanaimo
- 9553 – Ipimorpha viridipallida
- 9555 – Ipimorpha pleonectusa, even-lined sallow moth
- 9556 – Chytonix palliatricula, cloaked marvel moth
- 9557 – Chytonix sensilis
- 9558.1 – Niphonyx segregata
- 9559 – Oligia divesta
- 9560 – Dypterygia rozmani, American bird's-wing moth
- 9560.1 – Dypterygia ligata
- 9561 – Dypterygia patina
- 9561.1 – Dypterygia ordinarius
- 9561.2 – Dypterygia punctirena
- 9562 – Dypterygia dolens
- 9562.1 – Acroria terens
- 9563 – Andropolia diversilineata
- 9564 – Andropolia contacta, Canadian giant moth
- 9565 – Apamea pallifera
- 9568 – Fishia dispar
- 9569 – Andropolia olorina
- 9570 – Andropolia aedon
- 9571 – Andropolia theodori
- 9572 – Andropolia olga
- 9574 – Aseptis lichena
- 9575 – Rhizagrotis cloanthoides
- 9576 – Rhizagrotis albalis
- 9577 – Pseudohadena vulnerea
- 9578 – Hyppa xylinoides, common hyppa moth
- 9579 – Hyppa contrasta
- 9579.1 – Hyppa potamus
- 9580 – Hyppa brunneicrista
- 9581 – Hyppa indistincta
- 9582 – Nedra ramosula, gray half-spot moth
- 9583 – Nedra stewarti
- 9584 – Nedra dora
- 9585 – Nedra hoeffleri
- 9586 – Agrotisia evelinae
- 9587 – Properigea loculosa
- 9588 – Properigea albimacula, white-spotted properigea moth
- 9589 – Properigea costa, barrens moth
- 9590 – Properigea continens
- 9591 – Properigea mephisto
- 9592 – Properigea tapeta
- 9593 – Properigea seitzi
- 9594 – Properigea suffusa
- 9595 – Properigea perolivalis
- 9596 – Properigea niveirena
- no number yet – Perigea bahamica
- 9597 – Hemibryomima chryselectra
- 9598 – Pseudobryomima distans
- 9599 – Pseudobryomima muscosa, mossy pseudobryomima moth
- 9600 – Pseudobryomima fallax
- 9601 – Pseudanarta flavidens
- 9602 – Pseudanarta actura
- 9603 – Pseudanarta basivirida
- 9604 – Pseudanarta caeca
- 9605 – Pseudanarta crocea
- 9606 – Pseudanarta flava
- 9607 – Pseudanarta singula
- 9608 – Pseudanarta pulverulenta
- 9609 – Pseudanarta exasperata
- 9610 – Pseudanarta perplexa
- 9611 – Pseudanarta damnata
- 9612 – Pseudanarta vexata
- 9613 – Pseudanarta daemonalis
- 9614 – Homoanarta falcata
- 9615 – Homoanarta peralta
- 9616 – Homoanarta carneola
- 9617 – Pseudanthoecia tumida
- 9618 – Phosphila turbulenta, turbulent phosphila moth
- 9619 – Phosphila miselioides, spotted phosphila moth
- 9620 – Miracavira brillians
- 9621 – Miracavira sylvia
- 9622 – Cropia connecta
- 9622.1 – Cropia ruthaea
- 9623 – Cropia templada
- 9624 – Phosphila fernae
- 9625 – Speocropia trichroma
- 9626 – Trachea delicata
- 9627 – Paratrachea viridescens
- 9628 – Neophaenis boucheri
- 9629 – Fagitana littera, marsh fern moth
- 9630 – Callopistria floridensis, Florida fern moth
- 9630.1 – Callopistria jamaicensis
- 9631 – Callopistria mollissima, pink-shaded fern moth
- 9632 – Callopistria granitosa, granitose fern moth
- 9633 – Callopistria cordata, silver-spotted fern moth
- 9634 – Phuphena tura
- 9636 – Acherdoa ferraria, chocolate moth
- 9637 – Magusa orbifera
- 9637.1 – Magusa divaricata, orbed narrow-wing moth
- 9638 – Amphipyra pyramidoides, copper underwing moth
- 9639 – Amphipyra tragopoginis, mouse moth
- 9640 – Amphipyra glabella, smooth amphipyra moth
- 9641 – Amphipyra brunneoatra
- 9642 – Protoperigea anotha
- 9643 – Protoperigea posticata
- 9643.1 – Protoperigea umbricata
- 9643.2 – Protoperigea subterminata
- 9643.3 – Protoperigea parvulata
- 9643.4 – Protoperigea calientensis
- 9644 – Micrathetis triplex, triplex cutworm moth
- 9645 – Micrathetis costiplaga
- 9646 – Micrathetis tecnion
- 9647 – Proxenus miranda, Miranda moth
- 9648 – Proxenus mindara
- 9649 – Proxenus mendosa
- 9650 – Athetis tarda, slowpoke moth
- 9651 – Anorthodes triquetra
- 9652 – Anorthodes indigena
- 9653 – Caradrina morpheus, mottled rustic moth
- 9654 – Caradrina meralis, rare sand Quaker moth
- 9655 – Caradrina camina
- 9655.1 – Caradrina beta
- 9656 – Caradrina montana, civil rustic moth
- 9657 – Caradrina multifera, speckled rustic moth
- 9658 – Caradrina mona
- 9659 – Caradrina atrostriga
- 9660 – Caradrina distinctoides
- 9660.1 – Caradrina clavipalpis, pale mottled willow moth
- 9661 – Crambodes talidiformis, verbena moth
- 9662 – Balsa malana, many-dotted appleworm moth
- 9663 – Balsa tristrigella, three-lined balsa moth
- 9664 – Balsa labecula, white-blotched balsa moth
- 9665 – Spodoptera exigua, beet armyworm moth
- 9666 – Spodoptera frugiperda, fall armyworm moth
- 9667 – Spodoptera praefica, western yellowstriped armyworm moth
- 9668 – Spodoptera pulchella, Caribbean armyworm moth
- 9669 – Spodoptera ornithogalli, yellow-striped armyworm moth
- 9670 – Spodoptera latifascia, velvet armyworm moth
- 9671 – Spodoptera dolichos, dolichos armyworm moth
- 9671.1 – Spodoptera androgea, androgea armyworm moth
- 9672 – Spodoptera eridania, southern armyworm moth
- 9673 – Spodoptera albula, gray-streaked armyworm moth
- 9674 – Spodoptera hipparis
- 9675 – Elaphria fuscimacula
- 9676 – Elaphria nucicolora, sugarcane midget moth
- 9677 – Elaphria agrotina
- 9678 – Elaphria versicolor, variegated midget moth
- 9678.1 – Elaphria devara
- 9679 – Elaphria chalcedonia, chalcedony midget moth
- 9679.1 – Elaphria deltoides
- 9680 – Elaphria georgei, George's midget moth
- 9681 – Elaphria festivoides, festive midget moth
- 9681.1 – Elaphria alapallida, pale-winged midget moth
- 9681.2 – Elaphria cornutinus
- 9682 – Elaphria exesa, exesa midget moth
- 9682.1 – Elaphria subobliqua
- 9683 – Bryolymnia ensina
- 9683.1 – Bryolymnia biformata
- 9684 – Elaphria grata, grateful midget moth
- 9685 – Bryolymnia viridimedia
- 9685.1 – Bryolymnia marti
- 9685.2 – Bryolymnia mixta
- 9686 – Bryolymnia semifascia, half-banded bryolymnia moth
- 9686.1 – Bryolymnia anthracitaria
- 9687 – Gonodes liquida
- 9688 – Galgula partita, wedgling moth
- 9689 – Perigea xanthioides, red groundling moth
- 9689.1 – Perigea berinda
- 9689.2 – Perigea enixa
- 9690 – Condica videns, white-dotted groundling moth
- 9691 – Condica temecula
- 9692 – Condica discistriga
- 9693 – Condica mobilis, mobile groundling moth
- 9694 – Condica mersa
- 9695 – Condica albolabes
- 9696 – Condica vecors, dusky groundling moth
- 9697 – Condica orta
- 9698 – Condica concisa
- 9699 – Condica sutor, cobbler moth
- 9700 – Condica claufacta
- 9701 – Condica proxima
- 9701.1 – Condica punctifera
- 9702 – Condica albigera
- 9702.1 – Condica vacillans
- 9702.2 – Condica parista
- 9703 – Condica hypocritica
- 9704 – Condica revellata
- 9705 – Condica leucorena
- 9707 – Condica andrena
- 9708 – Condica lunata
- 9709 – Condica begallo
- 9710 – Condica egestis
- 9711 – Condica ignota
- 9712 – Condica morsa
- 9713 – Condica cupentia, splotched groundling moth
- 9714 – Condica confederata, Confederate moth
- 9715 – Stibaera curvilineata
- 9716 – Stibaera thyatiroides, whaleback moth
- 9717 – Emarginea pallida
- 9718 – Emarginea percara, beloved emarginea moth
- 9719 – Emarginea dulcinea
- 9720 – Ogdoconta cinereola, common pinkband moth
- 9721 – Ogdoconta moreno
- 9722 – Ogdoconta sexta
- 9723 – Ogdoconta altura
- 9724 – Ogdoconta tacna
- no number yet – Ogdoconta fergusoni
- no number yet – Ogdoconta rufipenna
- no number yet – Ogdoconta satana
- 9725 – Azenia obtusa, obtuse yellow moth
- 9726 – Azenia edentata
- 9727 – Azenia perflava
- 9728 – Azenia virida
- 9729 – Azenia implora
- 9730 – Azenia templetonae
- 9731 – Narthecophora pulverea
- 9732 – Lythrodes radiatus
- 9733 – Lythrodes venatus
- 9734 – Lythrodes tripuncta
- 9735 – Heminocloa mirabilis
- 9736 – Bistica noela
- 9737 – Neumoegenia poetica, poetry moth
- 9740 – Plagiomimicus ochoa
- 9741 – Plagiomimicus aureolum
- 9741.1 – Plagiomimicus heitzmani
- 9742 – Plagiomimicus olvello
- 9743 – Cuahtemoca unicum
- 9744 – Plagiomimicus manti
- 9745 – Plagiomimicus dimidiata
- 9746 – Plagiomimicus astigmatosum
- 9747 – Plagiomimicus curiosum
- 9748 – Plagiomimicus spumosum, frothy moth
- 9748.1 – Plagiomimicus caesium
- 9750 – Plagiomimicus hilli
- 9750.1 – Plagiomimicus kathyae
- 9751 – Plagiomimicus navia
- 9752 – Plagiomimicus expallidus
- 9753 – Plagiomimicus triplagiatus
- 9754 – Plagiomimicus pityochromus, black-barred brown moth
- 9755 – Plagiomimicus tepperi
- 9755.1 – Plagiomimicus mimica
- 9756 – Lineostriastiria hutsoni
- 9757 – Lineostriastiria olivalis
- 9758 – Lineostriastiria hachita
- 9759 – Lineostriastiria sexseriata
- 9760 – Lineostriastiria biundulalis
- 9761 – Chrysoecia scira
- 9763 – Chrysoecia gladiola
- 9764 – Chrysoecia atrolinea
- 9765 – Cirrhophanus dyari
- 9766 – Cirrhophanus triangulifer, goldenrod stowaway moth
- 9766.1 – Cirrhophanus pretiosa
- 9767 – Eulithosia plesioglauca
- 9768 – Eulithosia papago
- 9768.1 – Angulostiria chryseochilus
- 9769 – Eulithosia discistriga
- 9770 – Hoplolythrodes arivaca
- 9771 – Xanthothrix neumoegeni
- 9772 – Xanthothrix ranunculi
- 9773 – Eulithosia composita
- 9774 – Chrysoecia thoracica
- 9775 – Chalcopasta territans
- 9776 – Chalcopasta howardi
- 9777 – Chalcopasta fulgens
- 9778 – Chalcopasta acema
- 9779 – Argentostiria koebelei
- 9780 – Basilodes chrysopis
- 9781 – Basilodes pepita, gold moth
- 9781.1 – Basilodes straminea
- 9783 – Stiria blanchardi
- 9784 – Stiria consuela
- 9785 – Stiria rugifrons, yellow sunflower moth
- 9785.1 – Stiria intermixta
- 9786 – Stiria dyari
- 9787 – Stiria sulphurea
- 9787.1 – Stiria satana
- 9788 – Fala ptychophora
- 9789 – Chamaeclea pernana
- 9790 – Chamaeclea basiochrea
- 9791 – Oslaria viridifera, green oslaria moth
- 9792 – Oslaria pura
- 9793 – Nocloa plagiata
- 9794 – Nocloa rivulosa
- 9795 – Nocloa pallens
- 9796 – Nocloa cordova
- 9797 – Nocloa nanata
- 9798 – Nocloa pilacho
- 9799 – Nocloa alcandra
- 9800 – Nocloa aliaga
- 9801 – Nocloa duplicatus
- 9802 – Paramiana callaisata
- 9803 – Paramiana smaragdina
- 9804 – Paramiana marina
- 9805 – Paramiana perissa
- 9806 – Paramiana canoa
- 9806.1 – Euamiana endopolia
- 9807 – Euamiana contrasta
- 9807.1 – Euamiana adusta
- 9808 – Euamiana dissimilis
- 9809 – Euamiana torniplaga
- 9810 – Ruacodes tela
- 9811 – Petalumaria californica
- 9812 – Redingtonia alba
- 9813 – Cosmia epipaschia
- 9814 – Cosmia praeacuta
- 9814.1 – Cosmia elisae
- 9815 – Cosmia calami, American dun-bar moth
- 9816 – Zotheca tranquilla, elder moth
- 9817 – Thurberiphaga diffusa
- 9818 – Amolita fessa, feeble grass moth
- 9819 – Amolita obliqua, oblique grass moth
- 9820 – Amolita sentalis
- 9821 – Amolita roseola
- 9822 – Amolita fratercula
- 9823 – Amolita delicata
- 9824 – Hemioslaria pima
- 9825 – Acopa carina
- 9826 – Acopa perpallida
- 9827 – Nacopa bistrigata
- 9828 – Nacopa melanderi
- 9829 – Prothrinax luteomedia
- 9830 – Walterella ocellata
- 9831 – Escaria clauda
- 9832 – Escaria homogena
- 9833 – Fotella notalis
- 9837 – Cephalospargeta elongata
- 9838 – Rhizagrotis modesta
- 9839 – Aleptinoides ochrea
- 9840 – Anycteola fotelloides
- 9841 – Afotella cylindrica
- 9842 – Fota armata
- 9843 – Fota minorata
- 9844 – Gloanna grisescens
- 9844.1 – Gloanna hecate
- 9845 – Podagra crassipes
- 9846 – Policocnemis ungulatus
- 9847 – Minofala instans
- 9848 – Eviridemas minuta
- 9849 – Axenus arvalis
- 9850 – Annaphila danistica
- 9851 – Annaphila hennei
- 9852 – Annaphila mera
- 9853 – Annaphila pustulata
- 9854 – Annaphila arvalis
- 9855 – Annaphila abdita
- 9855.1 – Annaphila scurlockorum
- 9856 – Annaphila baueri
- 9857 – Annaphila astrologa
- 9858 – Annaphila vivianae
- 9859 – Annaphila pseudoastrologa
- 9860 – Annaphila olgae
- 9861 – Annaphila ida
- 9862 – Annaphila divinula
- 9863 – Annaphila lithosina
- 9864 – Annaphila miona
- 9865 – Annaphila casta
- 9866 – Annaphila depicta
- 9867 – Annaphila macfarlandi
- 9868 – Annaphila decia
- 9869 – Annaphila diva
- 9870 – Annaphila superba
- 9871 – Annaphila spila
- 9872 – Annaphila evansi
- 9873 – Xylena nupera, American swordgrass moth
- 9874 – Xylena curvimacula, dot-and-dash swordgrass moth
- 9875 – Xylena thoracica
- 9876 – Xylena cineritia, gray swordgrass moth
- 9877 – Xylena brucei
- 9878 – Lithomoia germana
- 9879 – Homoglaea variegata
- 9880 – Homoglaea californica
- 9881 – Homoglaea hircina, goat sallow moth
- 9882 – Homoglaea dives
- 9883 – Homoglaea carbonaria
- 9884 – Litholomia napaea
- 9885 – Lithophane semiusta
- 9886 – Lithophane patefacta, dimorphic pinion moth
- 9887 – Lithophane bethunei, Bethune's pinion moth
- 9888 – Lithophane innominata, nameless pinion moth
- 9888.1 – Lithophane franclemonti
- 9888.99 – Lithophane nr. innominata
- 9889 – Lithophane petulca, wanton pinion moth
- 9891 – Lithophane amanda
- 9892 – Lithophane disposita, dashed gray pinion moth
- 9893 – Lithophane hemina, hemina pinion moth
- 9893.1 – Lithophane lanei
- 9893.2 – Lithophane joannis
- 9894 – Lithophane oriunda, immigrant pinion moth
- 9895 – Lithophane signosa, signate pinion moth
- 9896 – Lithophane gausapata
- 9897 – Lithophane contra
- 9898 – Lithophane longior
- 9898.1 – Lithophane boogeri
- 9899 – Lithophane lemmeri
- 9899.1 – Lithophane thujae, cedar pinion moth
- 9900 – Lithophane subtilis
- 9901 – Lithophane contenta
- 9902 – Lithophane baileyi, Bailey's pinion moth
- 9904 – Lithophane querquera, shivering pinion moth
- 9904.1 – Lithophane scottae
- 9905 – Lithophane viridipallens, pale green pinion moth
- 9906 – Lithophane pruena
- 9907 – Lithophane puella
- 9908 – Lithophane laceyi
- 9909 – Lithophane tepida
- 9910 – Lithophane antennata, ashen pinion moth
- 9911 – Lithophane torrida
- 9912 – Lithophane pertorrida
- 9913 – Lithophane georgii
- 9914 – Lithophane laticinerea
- 9915 – Lithophane grotei, Grote's pinion moth
- 9916 – Lithophane unimoda, dowdy pinion moth
- 9917 – Lithophane fagina, hoary pinion moth
- 9918 – Lithophane tarda
- 9919 – Lithophane tephrina
- 9920 – Lithophane itata
- 9922 – Lithophane pexata
- 9923 – Lithophane dilatocula
- 9923.1 – Lithophane leeae
- 9924 – Lithophane atara
- 9924.1 – Lithophane ponderosa
- 9924.2 – Lithophane jefferyi
- 9925 – Lithophane lepida
- 9925.1 – Lithophane adipel
- 9926 – Lithophane nasar
- 9927 – Lithophane vanduzeei
- 9928 – Lithophane thaxteri, Thaxter's pinion moth
- 9928.1 – Lithophane abita
- 9929 – Pyreferra hesperidago, mustard sallow moth
- 9930 – Pyreferra citrombra, citrine sallow moth
- 9931 – Pyreferra ceromatica
- 9932 – Pyreferra pettiti
- 9933 – Eupsilia vinulenta, straight-toothed sallow moth
- 9933.1 – Eupsilia sidus, sidus sallow moth
- 9934 – Eupsilia cirripalea, Franclemont's sallow moth
- 9935 – Eupsilia tristigmata, three-spotted sallow moth
- 9936 – Eupsilia morrisoni, Morrison's sallow moth
- 9937 – Eupsilia knowltoni
- 9938 – Eupsilia fringata
- 9939 – Eupsilia devia, lost sallow moth
- 9941 – Sericaglaea signata, variable sallow moth
- 9942 – Xystopeplus rufago, red-winged sallow moth
- 9943 – Metaxaglaea inulta, unsated sallow moth
- 9944 – Metaxaglaea viatica, roadside sallow moth
- 9945 – Metaxaglaea semitaria, footpath sallow moth
- 9945.1 – Metaxaglaea australis, southern sallow moth
- 9945.2 – Metaxaglaea violacea, holly sallow moth
- 9946 – Epiglaea decliva, sloping sallow moth
- 9947 – Epiglaea apiata, pointed sallow moth
- 9948 – Chaetaglaea cerata, waxed sallow moth
- 9948.1 – Chaetaglaea fergusoni, Ferguson's sallow moth
- 9949 – Chaetaglaea tremula, trembling sallow moth
- 9950 – Chaetaglaea sericea, silky sallow moth
- no number yet – Chaetaglaea rhonda
- 9951 – Psectraglaea carnosa
- 9952 – Eucirroedia pampina, scalloped sallow moth
- 9953 – Mesogona olivata
- 9953.1 – Mesogona rubra
- 9953.2 – Mesogona subcuprea
- 9954 – Agrochola purpurea
- 9955 – Agrochola pulchella
- 9956 – Agrochola lota
- 9957 – Sunira bicolorago, bicolored sallow moth
- 9958 – Sunira decipiens
- 9960 – Sunira verberata, battered sallow moth
- 9961 – Anathix ralla, dotted sallow moth
- 9962 – Anathix puta, Puta sallow moth
- 9963 – Anathix aggressa
- 9965 – Xanthia tatago, pink-barred sallow moth
- 9966 – Hillia maida
- 9967 – Hillia iris, iris rover moth
- 9970 – Fishia discors
- 9971 – Fishia connecta
- 9972 – Fishia yosemitae
- no number yet – Fishia nigrescens
- 9976 – Platypolia anceps
- 9977 – Platypolia contadina
- 9978 – Platypolia loda
- 9979 – Xylotype capax, broad sallow moth
- 9980 – Xylotype arcadia, Acadian sallow moth
- 9981 – Dryotype opina
- 9982 – Mniotype adjusta
- 9983 – Mniotype pallescens
- 9987 – Mniotype ducta
- 9988 – Mniotype tenera
- 9989 – Sutyna privata
- 9992 – Pachypolia atricornis
- 9993 – Brachylomia populi
- 9994 – Brachylomia elda
- 9995 – Brachylomia rectifascia
- 9995.1 – Brachylomia pallida
- 9995.2 – Brachylomia cascadia
- 9996 – Brachylomia curvifascia
- 9996.1 – Brachylomia obscurifascia
- 9997 – Brachylomia thula
- 9997.1 – Brachylomia sierra
- 9998 – Brachylomia algens
- 9999 – Brachylomia discinigra
- 10001 – Brachylomia discolor
- 10002 – Epidemas cinerea
- 10003 – Epidemas obscurus
- 10005 – Feralia jocosa, joker moth
- 10006 – Feralia deceptiva, deceptive sallow moth
- 10007 – Feralia major, major sallow moth
- 10008 – Feralia comstocki, Comstock's sallow moth
- 10009 – Feralia februalis
- 10010 – Feralia meadowsi
- 10011 – Brachionycha borealis
- 10012 – Psaphida electilis, chosen sallow moth
- 10013 – Psaphida grandis, gray sallow moth
- 10014 – Psaphida rolandi, Roland's sallow moth
- 10015 – Psaphida damalis
- 10016 – Psaphida styracis, fawn sallow moth
- 10017 – Pseudocopivaleria sonoma
- 10018 – Pseudocopivaleria anaverta
- 10019 – Psaphida resumens, figure-eight sallow moth
- 10020 – Psaphida thaxterianus
- 10021 – Copivaleria grotei, Grote's sallow moth
- 10022 – Apsaphida eremna
- 10023 – Viridemas galena
- 10024 – Supralathosea baboquivariensis
- 10025 – Provia argentata
- 10026 – Pleromella opter
- 10027 – Pleromelloida conserta
- 10029 – Pleromelloida bonuscula
- 10030 – Pleromelloida arizonata
- 10031 – Pleromelloida cinerea, ashy pleromelloida moth
- 10032 – Neogalea sunia, lantana stick moth
- 10033 – Catabena lineolata, fine-lined sallow moth
- 10034 – Catabena sagittata
- 10035 – Supralathosea pronuba
- 10036 – Catabenoides vitrina
- 10037 – Catabenoides terminellus
- 10038 – Catabenoides divisa
- 10039 – Oxycnemis advena
- 10040 – Sympistis orbicularis
- 10041 – Sympistis subsimplex
- 10042 – Sympistis franclemonti
- 10042.1 – Sympistis shait
- 10042.2 – Sympistis saxatilis
- 10042.3 – Sympistis opleri
- 10043 – Oxycnemis gracillinia
- 10044 – Oxycnemis acuna
- 10045 – Oxycnemis gustis
- 10046 – Oxycnemis fusimacula
- 10047 – Oxycnemis erratica
- 10048 – Oxycnemis grandimacula
- 10049 – Leucocnemis perfundis
- 10050 – Leucocnemis nivalis
- 10051 – Leucocnemis obscurella
- 10052 – Leucocnemis variabilis
- 10053 – Tristyla alboplagiata
- 10054 – Sympistis apposita
- 10055 – Sympistis dentata, toothed apharetra moth
- 10055.1 – Sympistis anweileri
- 10058 – Sympistis californiae
- 10059 – Sympistis badistriga, brown-lined sallow moth
- 10060 – Sympistis induta
- 10061 – Sympistis inconstans
- 10062 – Sympistis stabilis
- 10063 – Sympistis rustica
- 10063.1 – Sympistis kelsoensis
- 10064 – Sympistis incomitata
- 10065 – Sympistis infixa, broad-lined sallow moth
- 10066 – Sympistis fifia
- 10066.1 – Sympistis dinalda
- 10066.2 – Sympistis kappa
- 10067 – Sympistis chionanthi, fringe-tree sallow moth
- no number yet – Sympistis forbesi
- 10068 – Sympistis fortis
- 10068.1 – Sympistis picina
- 10069 – Sympistis mirificalis
- 10070 – Sympistis dayi
- 10071 – Sympistis euta
- 10072 – Sympistis hayesi
- 10072.1 – Sympistis anubis
- 10073 – Sympistis regina
- 10074 – Sympistis corusca
- 10074.1 – Sympistis sorapis
- 10075 – Sympistis kelloggii
- 10076 – Sympistis albifasciata
- 10077 – Sympistis melantho
- 10077.1 – Sympistis acheron
- 10077.2 – Sympistis cocytus
- 10078 – Sympistis sandaraca
- 10079 – Sympistis pudorata
- 10080 – Sympistis tenuifascia
- 10081 – Sympistis parvanigra
- 10081.1 – Sympistis parvacana
- 10082 – Sympistis lepipoloides
- 10082.1 – Sympistis tartarea
- 10082.2 – Sympistis baloghi
- 10082.3 – Sympistis jenniferae
- 10082.4 – Sympistis osiris
- 10082.5 – Sympistis isis
- 10082.6 – Sympistis horus
- 10083 – Sympistis glennyi
- 10085 – Sympistis terminalis
- 10085.1 – Sympistis coprocolor
- 10086 – Sympistis linda
- 10087 – Sympistis benjamini
- 10088 – Sympistis deceptiva
- 10089 – Sympistis basifugens
- 10090 – Sympistis modesta
- 10091 – Sympistis balteata
- 10092 – Sympistis iricolor
- 10093 – Sympistis levis
- 10093.1 – Sympistis incubus
- 10093.2 – Sympistis duplex
- 10093.3 – Sympistis seth
- 10093.4 – Sympistis sesmu
- 10093.5 – Sympistis insanina
- 10094 – Sympistis sanina
- 10094.1 – Sympistis sakhmet
- 10094.2 – Sympistis ptah
- 10094.3 – Sympistis jocelynae
- 10094.4 – Sympistis poliochroa
- 10095 – Sympistis simplex
- 10095.1 – Sympistis lachrymosa
- 10095.2 – Sympistis goedeni
- 10096 – Sympistis augustus
- 10097 – Sympistis nita
- 10098 – Sympistis meadiana
- 10099 – Sympistis saundersiana, Saunders' sallow moth
- 10100 – Sympistis fasciata
- 10101 – Sympistis occata
- 10102 – Sympistis pernotata
- 10102.1 – Sympistis apis
- 10102.2 – Sympistis buchis
- 10103 – Sympistis polingii
- 10104 – Sympistis homogena
- 10104.1 – Sympistis sobek
- 10104.2 – Sympistis ra
- 10104.3 – Sympistis khem
- 10104.4 – Sympistis septu
- 10104.5 – Sympistis hathor
- 10105 – Sympistis heterogena
- 10105.1 – Sympistis cleopatra
- 10106 – Sympistis arizonensis
- 10107 – Sympistis melalutea
- 10108 – Sympistis viriditincta
- 10109 – Sympistis singularis
- 10110 – Sympistis wilsonensis
- 10111 – Unciella primula
- 10112 – Unciella flagrantis
- 10113 – Sympistis chorda
- 10113.1 – Sympistis hapi
- 10113.2 – Sympistis sokar
- 10113.3 – Sympistis dischorda
- 10113.4 – Sympistis buto
- 10113.5 – Sympistis extremis
- 10113.6 – Sympistis doris
- 10114 – Sympistis rosea
- 10115 – Sympistis bakeri
- 10116 – Sympistis youngi
- 10118 – Sympistis columbia
- 10118.1 – Sympistis pallida
- 10118.2 – Sympistis helena
- 10118.3 – Sympistis cherti
- 10119 – Sympistis punctilinea
- 10119.1 – Sympistis rayata
- 10120 – Sympistis deserta
- 10121 – Sympistis barnesii
- 10122 – Sympistis umbrifascia
- 10122.1 – Sympistis satanella
- 10123 – Sympistis piffardi
- 10123.1 – Sympistis chalybdis
- 10124 – Sympistis cibalis
- 10124.1 – Sympistis amenthes
- 10125 – Sympistis laticosta
- 10126 – Sympistis lacticollis
- 10127 – Sympistis nigrocaput
- 10128 – Sympistis atricollaris
- 10129 – Sympistis cottami
- 10130 – Sympistis figurata
- 10130.1 – Sympistis disfigurata
- 10130.2 – Sympistis pallidior
- 10131 – Sympistis minor
- 10131.1 – Sympistis greyi
- 10132 – Sympistis ragani
- 10133 – Sympistis semicollaris
- 10133.1 – Sympistis collaris
- 10134 – Sympistis astrigata
- 10134.1 – Sympistis babi
- 10135 – Sympistis riparia
- 10135.1 – Sympistis aqualis
- 10135.2 – Sympistis amun
- 10135.4 – Sympistis major
- 10135.5 – Sympistis richersi
- 10135.6 – Sympistis mut
- 10135.7 – Sympistis chons
- 10135.8 – Sympistis nenun
- 10136 – Sympistis obscurata
- 10137 – Sympistis intruda
- 10138 – Sympistis ciliata
- 10139 – Sympistis curvicollis
- 10139.1 – Sympistis pachet
- 10140 – Sympistis chandleri
- 10142 – Sympistis sagittata
- 10142.1 – Sympistis shirleyae
- 10143 – Sympistis mackiei
- 10144 – Sympistis ibapahensis
- 10145 – Sympistis extranea
- 10146 – Sympistis utahensis
- 10147 – Sympistis tetrops
- 10147.1 – Sympistis knudsoni
- 10147.2 – Sympistis khepri
- 10147.3 – Sympistis min
- 10148 – Sympistis griseicollis
- 10149 – Sympistis sectilis
- 10150 – Sympistis sectiloides
- 10150.1 – Sympistis bes
- 10151 – Sympistis dunbari
- 10151.1 – Sympistis definita
- 10152 – Sympistis poliafascies
- 10153 – Sympistis toddi
- 10154 – Sympistis perscripta, scribbled sallow moth
- 10155 – Sympistis behrensi
- 10156 – Sympistis heliophila
- 10157 – Sympistis lapponica
- 10158 – Sympistis wilsoni
- 10159 – Sympistis nigrita
- 10162 – Sympistis funebris
- 10163 – Stylopoda cephalica
- 10164 – Sympistis aterrima
- 10164.1 – Sympistis apep
- 10165 – Stylopoda groteana
- 10166 – Stylopoda modestella
- 10167 – Stylopoda anxia
- 10168 – Copanarta sexpunctata
- 10169 – Copanarta aurea
- 10171 – Pseudacontia louisa
- 10172 – Pseudacontia crustaria
- 10173 – Pseudacontia cansa
- 10174 – Triocnemis saporis
- 10174.98 – Triocnemidini n. gen., Triocnemidini new genus
- 10175 – Crimona pallimedia
- 10176 – Rhizagrotis stylata
- 10177 – Calophasia lunula, toadflax brocade moth
- 10178 – Behrensia conchiformis
- 10179 – Behrensia bicolor
- 10180 – Cucullia pulla
- 10181 – Cucullia dammersi
- 10183 – Cucullia strigata, streaked hooded owlet moth
- 10184 – Cucullia serraticornis
- 10185 – Cucullia comstocki
- 10187.2 – Cucullia albida
- 10188 – Dolocucullia dentilinea
- 10189 – Supralothosea obtusa
- 10190 – Cucullia speyeri, Speyer's hooded owlet moth
- 10190.1 – Cucullia styx
- 10190.2 – Cucullia dorsalis
- 10191 – Cucullia laetifica
- 10191.1 – Cucullia lethe
- 10191.2 – Cucullia charon
- 10192 – Cucullia alfarata, camphorweed owlet moth
- 10192.1 – Cucullia eccissica
- 10193 – Dolocucullia minor
- 10194 – Cucullia intermedia, intermediate hooded owlet moth
- 10194.1 – Cucullia umbratica
- 10195 – Cucullia similaris
- 10196 – Cucullia lilacina
- 10197 – Cucullia florea, gray-hooded-owlet moth
- 10198 – Cucullia postera
- 10199 – Cucullia omissa, omitted hooded owlet moth
- 10200 – Cucullia asteroides, asteroid moth
- 10201 – Cucullia montanae, mountain hooded owlet moth
- 10201.1 – Cucullia eucaena
- 10202 – Cucullia convexipennis, brown-hooded owlet moth
- 10203 – Cucullia oribac
- 10205 – Cucullia luna
- 10206 – Cucullia antipoda
- 10206.1 – Cucullia eurekae
- 10207 – Cucullia basipuncta
- 10208 – Cucullia mcdunnoughi
- 10209 – Cucullia eulepis
- 10210 – Cucullia cucullioides
- 10212 – Cucullia incresa
- 10213 – Cucullia heinrichi
- 10214 – Cucullia astigma
- 10216 – Opsigalea blanchardi
- 10217 – Emariannia cucullidea
- 10218 – Sparkia immacula
- 10219 – Trichocosmia inornata
- 10220 – Trichocosmia drasteroides
- 10221 – Hadenella pergentilis
- 10222 – Anarta chartaria
- 10223 – Anarta trifolii, nutmeg moth
- 10224 – Anarta mutata, mutant moth
- 10225 – Anarta fulgora
- 10226 – Anarta castrae
- 10227 – Anarta hamata
- 10228 – Anarta oregonica
- 10228.1 – Anarta columbica
- 10228.2 – Anarta montanica
- 10229 – Anarta alta
- 10230 – Anarta subalbida
- 10231 – Anarta obesula
- 10232 – Anarta farnhami
- 10233 – Anarta crotchii
- 10233.1 – Anarta fusculenta
- 10234 – Anarta oaklandiae
- 10236 – Anarta projecta
- 10237 – Trudestra hadeniformis
- 10238 – Scotogramma submarina
- 10239 – Scotogramma fervida
- 10240 – Scotogramma densa
- 10241 – Scotogramma stretchii
- 10242 – Scotogramma harnardi
- 10243 – Scotogramma addenda
- 10244 – Scotogramma ptilodonta
- 10245 – Scotogramma megaera
- 10246 – Scotogramma hirsuta
- 10247 – Scotogramma yakima
- 10248 – Scotogramma orida
- 10249 – Scotogramma gatei
- 10250 – Scotogramma fieldi
- 10251 – Scotogramma deffessa
- 10252 – Scotogramma inconcinna
- 10253 – Tridepia nova
- 10255 – Anarta edwardsii
- 10256 – Sideridis fuscolutea
- 10257 – Anarta florida
- 10258 – Anarta antica
- 10259 – Anarta decepta
- 10260 – Sideridis mojave
- 10261 – Sideridis uscripta
- 10262 – Sideridis ruisa
- 10263 – Sideridis artesta
- 10264 – Sideridis vindemialis
- 10265 – Sideridis rosea, rosewing moth
- 10266 – Sideridis congermana, German cousin moth
- 10267 – Tricholita palmillo
- 10268 – Sideridis maryx, maroonwing moth
- 10269 – Admetovis oxymorus
- 10270 – Admetovis similaris
- 10270.1 – Hecatera dysodea, small ranunculus moth
- 10271 – Mamestra configurata
- 10272 – Mamestra curialis
- 10273 – Polia discalis
- 10274 – Polia piniae
- 10275 – Polia nimbosa, stormy arches moth
- 10276 – Polia imbrifera, cloudy arches moth
- 10277 – Polia rogenhoferi
- 10277.1 – Polia propodea
- 10279 – Polia richardsoni
- 10280 – Polia purpurissata, purple arches moth
- 10281 – Polia nugatis
- 10282 – Orthodes noverca
- 10283 – Orthodes vauorbicularis
- 10284 – Orthodes delecta
- 10285 – Hexorthodes tuana
- 10286 – Hexorthodes nipana
- 10288 – Orthodes detracta, disparaged arches moth
- 10289 – Orthodes goodelli, Goodell's arches moth
- 10290 – Orthodes obscura
- 10291 – Morrisonia latex, fluid arches moth
- 10292 – Melanchra adjuncta, hitched arches moth
- 10293 – Melanchra picta, zebra caterpillar moth
- 10294 – Melanchra pulverulenta
- 10295 – Melanchra assimilis, black arches moth
- 10296 – Lacanobia nevadae, Nevada arches moth
- 10297 – Lacanobia atlantica, Atlantic arches moth
- 10298 – Lacanobia radix, garden arches moth
- 10299 – Lacanobia subjuncta, speckled cutworm moth
- 10300 – Lacanobia grandis, grand arches moth
- 10301 – Spiramater lutra, otter spiramater moth
- 10302 – Trichordestra rugosa, wrinkled trichordestra moth
- 10303 – Trichordestra tacoma
- 10304 – Trichordestra legitima, striped garden caterpillar moth
- 10305 – Trichordestra dodii
- 10306 – Trichordestra beanii
- 10307 – Trichordestra lilacina, aster cutworm moth
- 10308 – Trichordestra liquida
- 10309 – Trichordestra prodeniformis
- 10310 – Papestra quadrata
- 10311 – Papestra biren
- 10312 – Papestra cristifera
- 10313 – Papestra brenda
- 10314 – Papestra invalida
- 10315 – Lasionycta secedens
- 10316 – Hadena ectypa
- 10317 – Hadena capsularis, capsule moth
- 10317.1 – Hadena lafontainei
- 10318 – Hadena minorata
- 10319 – Hadena amabilis
- 10321 – Hadena ectrapela
- 10322 – Hadena circumvadis
- 10322.1 – Hadena caelestis
- 10322.2 – Hadena gabrieli
- 10323 – Hadena plumasata
- 10323.1 – Hadena maccabei
- 10323.2 – Hadena paulula
- 10323.3 – Hadena siskiyou
- 10324 – Hada sutrina, sutrina moth
- 10325 – Hadena glaciata
- 10326 – Hadena variolata
- 10327 – Anarta nigrolunata
- 10328 – Anarta sierrae
- 10332 – Coranarta luteola
- 10332.1 – Coranarta macrostigma
- 10334 – Lasionycta staudingeri
- 10335 – Lasionycta quadrilunata
- 10336 – Lasionycta leucocycla
- 10337 – Lasionycta coloradensis
- 10337.1 – Lasionycta flanda
- 10337.2 – Lasionycta coracina
- 10337.3 – Lasionycta anthracina
- 10338 – Lasionycta lagganata
- 10338.1 – Lasionycta carolynae
- 10339 – Lasionycta impingens
- 10339.2 – Lasionycta phaea
- 10339.3 – Lasionycta skraelingia
- 10339.4 – Lasionycta taigata
- 10340 – Lasionycta discolor
- 10340.1 – Lasionycta mono
- 10341 – Lasionycta phoca
- 10342 – Lasionycta luteola
- 10344 – Lasionycta promulsa
- 10345 – Lasionycta macleani
- 10345.1 – Lasionycta pulverea
- 10345.2 – Lasionycta silacea
- 10345.3 – Lasionycta sierra
- 10346 – Lasionycta uniformis
- 10346.1 – Lasionycta brunnea
- 10346.2 – Lasionycta caesia
- 10346.3 – Lasionycta gelida
- 10348 – Lasionycta poca
- 10348.1 – Lasionycta illima
- 10348.2 – Lasionycta frigida
- 10348.3 – Lasionycta sasquatch
- 10350 – Lasionycta dolosa
- 10350.1 – Lasionycta subfumosa
- 10351 – Lacinipolia mimula
- 10352 – Lasionycta perplexa
- 10352.1 – Lasionycta perplexella
- 10352.2 – Lasionycta subalpina
- 10356 – Lasionycta subdita
- 10358 – Lasionycta subfuscula
- 10359 – Lasionycta benjamini
- 10360 – Lasionycta mutilata
- 10360.1 – Lasionycta haida
- 10362 – Lasionycta conjugata
- 10362.1 – Lasionycta fergusoni
- 10364 – Psammopolia arietis
- 10365 – Psammopolia wyatti
- 10366 – Psammopolia insolens
- 10366.1 – Psammopolia sala
- 10367 – Psammopolia ochracea
- 10368 – Lacinipolia meditata, thinker moth
- 10370 – Lacinipolia lustralis
- 10371 – Lacinipolia cuneata, cuneate arches moth
- 10372 – Lacinipolia anguina, snaky arches moth
- 10373 – Lacinipolia incurva
- 10374 – Lacinipolia longiclava
- 10375 – Lacinipolia gnata
- 10376 – Lacinipolia agnata
- 10377 – Lacinipolia prognata
- 10377.1 – Lacinipolia delongi
- 10378 – Lacinipolia luteimacula
- 10379 – Lacinipolia umbrosa
- 10380 – Lacinipolia vittula
- 10381 – Lacinipolia naevia
- 10382 – Lacinipolia stenotis
- 10383 – Lacinipolia palilis
- 10384 – Lacinipolia uliginosa
- 10385 – Lacinipolia canities
- 10387 – Lacinipolia selama
- 10389 – Lacinipolia roseosuffusa
- 10390 – Lacinipolia falsa
- 10391 – Lacinipolia francisca
- 10392 – Lacinipolia leucogramma
- 10393 – Lacinipolia teligera
- 10394 – Lacinipolia vicina
- 10394.1 – Lacinipolia subalba
- 10395 – Lacinipolia pensilis
- 10396 – Lacinipolia basiplaga
- 10397 – Lacinipolia renigera, bristly cutworm moth
- 10398 – Lacinipolia stricta, brown arches moth
- 10399 – Lacinipolia circumcincta
- 10400 – Lacinipolia spiculosa
- 10401 – Lacinipolia lepidula
- 10402 – Lacinipolia perta
- 10403 – Lacinipolia erecta
- 10403.1 – Lacinipolia triplehorni
- 10405 – Lacinipolia lorea, bridled arches moth
- 10406 – Lacinipolia olivacea, olive arches moth
- 10406.1 – Lacinipolia bucketti
- 10406.2 – Lacinipolia baueri
- 10406.3 – Lacinipolia sharonae
- 10406.4 – Lacinipolia fordi
- 10406.5 – Lacinipolia franclemonti
- 10406.6 – Lacinipolia aileenae
- 10406.7 – Lacinipolia rodora
- 10407 – Lacinipolia davena
- 10408 – Lacinipolia comis
- 10409 – Lacinipolia rectilinea
- 10410 – Lacinipolia lunolacta
- 10411 – Lacinipolia laudabilis, laudable arches moth
- 10412 – Lacinipolia marinitincta
- 10413 – Lacinipolia explicata, explicit arches moth
- 10414 – Lacinipolia implicata, implicit arches moth
- 10415 – Lacinipolia strigicollis, collared arches moth
- 10417 – Lacinipolia tricornuta
- 10418 – Lacinipolia runica
- 10419 – Lacinipolia viridifera
- 10420 – Lacinipolia consimilis
- 10421 – Lacinipolia buscki
- 10422 – Lacinipolia quadrilineata
- 10422.1 – Lacinipolia martini
- 10423 – Lacinipolia patalis
- 10424 – Lacinipolia parvula
- 10425 – Trichocerapoda comstocki
- 10425.1 – Trichocerapoda harbisoni
- 10426 – Trichocerapoda strigata
- 10427 – Trichocerapoda oblita
- 10427.1 – Trichocerapoda oceanis
- 10428 – Dargida procinctus, olive green cutworm moth
- 10429 – Dargida grammivora
- 10430 – Dargida quadrannulata
- 10431 – Dargida diffusa, wheat head armyworm moth
- 10432 – Dargida terrapictalis
- 10433 – Dargida tetera
- 10434 – Dargida rubripennis, pink streak moth
- 10435 – Dargida aleada
- 10436 – Mythimna oxygala, lesser wainscot moth
- 10437 – Mythimna yukonensis
- 10438 – Mythimna unipuncta, armyworm moth
- 10438.1 – Mythimna sequax, wheat armyworm moth
- 10439 – Leucania extincta
- 10440 – Leucania linita
- 10441 – Leucania farcta
- 10441.1 – Leucania oregona, Oregon wainscot moth
- 10442 – Leucania anteroclara
- 10443 – Leucania februalis
- 10444 – Leucania phragmitidicola, phragmites wainscot moth
- 10445 – Leucania linda, Linda wainscot moth
- 10446 – Leucania multilinea, many-lined wainscot moth
- 10446.1 – Leucania lapidaria
- 10447 – Leucania commoides
- 10447.1 – Leucania dorsalis
- 10449 – Leucania insueta
- 10449.1 – Leucania dia
- 10450 – Leucania incognita
- 10450.1 – Leucania inconspicua
- 10451 – Leucania oaxacana
- 10451.1 – Leucania lobrega
- 10452 – Leucania imperfecta
- 10453 – Leucania stolata
- 10453.1 – Leucania subpunctata, forage armyworm moth
- 10455 – Leucania scirpicola, scirpus wainscot moth
- 10455.1 – Leucania senescens
- 10456 – Leucania adjuta, adjutant wainscot moth
- 10457 – Leucania infatuans
- 10458 – Leucania humidicola, sugarcane budworm moth
- 10459 – Leucania inermis, unarmed wainscot moth
- 10460 – Leucania calidior
- 10461 – Leucania ursula, Ursula wainscot moth
- 10462 – Leucania pseudargyria, false wainscot moth
- 10463 – Leucania pilipalpis
- 10464 – Perigonica tertia
- 10466 – Perigonica fulminans
- 10467 – Perigonica eldana
- 10468 – Perigonica angulata
- 10469 – Perigonica pectinata
- 10470 – Acerra normalis
- 10471 – Stretchia plusiaeformis
- 10472 – Stretchia pictipennis
- 10473 – Stretchia muricina
- 10474 – Stretchia pacifica
- 10475 – Stretchia inferior
- 10476 – Stretchia prima
- 10477 – Orthosia erythrolita
- 10478 – Orthosia pulchella
- 10479 – Orthosia transparens
- 10480 – Orthosia praeses
- 10481 – Orthosia mys
- 10482 – Orthosia ferrigera
- 10484 – Orthosia terminata
- 10485 – Orthosia behrensiana
- 10487 – Orthosia rubescens, ruby Quaker moth
- 10488 – Orthosia garmani, Garman's Quaker moth
- 10489 – Orthosia arthrolita
- 10490 – Orthosia revicta, subdued Quaker moth
- 10491 – Orthosia alurina, gray Quaker moth
- 10492 – Orthosia desperata
- 10493 – Orthosia segregata
- 10494 – Orthosia pacifica
- 10495 – Orthosia hibisci, speckled green fruitworm moth
- 10496 – Orthosia flaviannula
- 10497 – Orthosia annulimacula
- 10498 – Orthosia tenuimacula
- 10499 – Orthosia mediomacula
- 10500 – Orthosia nongenerica
- 10501 – Crocigrapha normani, Norman's Quaker moth
- 10502 – Himella fidelis, intractable Quaker moth
- 10503 – Egira baueri
- 10504 – Egira variabilis
- 10505 – Egira hiemalis
- 10506 – Egira simplex
- 10507 – Egira vanduzeei
- 10508 – Egira crucialis
- 10509 – Egira cognata
- 10510 – Egira februalis, mottled oak woodling moth
- 10511 – Egira curialis
- 10513 – Egira dolosa
- 10514 – Egira rubrica
- 10515 – Egira perlubens, brown woodling moth
- 10516 – Egira purpurea
- 10517 – Egira alternans, alternate woodling moth
- 10518 – Achatia distincta, distinct Quaker moth
- 10519 – Morrisonia mucens, gray Quaker moth
- 10520 – Morrisonia evicta, bicolored woodgrain moth
- 10521 – Morrisonia confusa, confused woodgrain moth
- 10521.1 – Morrisonia triangula
- 10522 – Cerapteryx graminis, antler moth
- 10523 – Tholera americana
- 10524 – Nephelodes minians, bronzed cutworm moth
- 10525 – Nephelodes demaculata
- 10526 – Nephelodes mendica
- 10527 – Nephelodes adusta
- 10528 – Nephelodes carminata
- 10529 – Anhimella perbrunnea
- 10530 – Anhimella contrahens
- 10531 – Anhimella pacifica
- 10532 – Homorthodes furfurata, northern scurfy Quaker moth
- 10532.1 – Homorthodes lindseyi, southern scurfy Quaker moth
- 10533 – Homorthodes communis, alder Quaker moth
- 10534 – Homorthodes fractura
- 10535 – Homorthodes discreta
- 10536 – Homorthodes dubia
- 10537 – Homorthodes mania
- 10538 – Homorthodes rubritincta
- 10539 – Homorthodes hanhami
- 10540 – Homorthodes carneola
- 10541 – Homorthodes reliqua
- 10542 – Homorthodes rectiflava
- 10543 – Homorthodes flosca
- 10544 – Homorthodes perturba
- 10545 – Homorthodes gigantoides
- 10546 – Protorthodes curtica
- 10549 – Protorthodes eureka
- 10552 – Protorthodes incincta, banded Quaker moth
- 10554 – Protorthodes smithii
- 10555 – Protorthodes argentoppida
- 10556 – Protorthodes perforata
- 10557 – Protorthodes rufula, rufous Quaker moth
- 10558 – Protorthodes antennata
- 10559 – Protorthodes alfkenii
- 10560 – Nudorthodes texana
- 10561 – Nudorthodes variabilis
- 10562 – Protorthodes mulina
- 10563 – Protorthodes oviduca, ruddy Quaker moth
- 10565 – Protorthodes orobia
- 10566 – Protorthodes melanopis
- no number yeat – Protorthodes texicana
- no number yeat – Protorthodes ustulata
- no number yeat – Nudorthodes molino
- 10567 – Ulolonche culea, sheathed Quaker moth
- 10568 – Ulolonche consopita
- 10569 – Ulolonche modesta
- 10570 – Ulolonche fasciata
- 10571 – Ulolonche marloffi
- 10572 – Ulolonche dilecta
- 10573 – Ulolonche disticha
- 10574 – Ulolonche orbiculata
- 10575 – Ulolonche niveiguttata
- 10576 – Hyperepia jugifera
- 10578 – Pseudorthodes vecors, small brown Quaker moth
- 10579 – Pseudorthodes calceolaris
- 10580 – Pseudorthodes imora
- 10581 – Pseudorthodes keela
- 10582 – Pseudorthodes irrorata
- 10583 – Pseudorthodes puerilis
- 10584 – Pseudorthodes virgula
- 10585 – Orthodes majuscula, rustic Quaker moth
- 10586 – Orthodes furtiva
- 10587 – Orthodes cynica, cynical Quaker moth
- 10588 – Orthodes adiastola
- 10589 – Orthodes bolteri
- 10590 – Synorthodes auriginea
- 10591 – Synorthodes typhedana
- 10592 – Hexorthodes serrata
- 10593 – Hexorthodes inconspicua
- 10594 – Hexorthodes jocosa
- 10596 – Hexorthodes agrotiformis
- 10597 – Hypotrix trifascia
- 10597.1 – Hyssia degenerans
- 10598 – Hexorthodes euxoiformis
- 10599 – Hypotrix alamosa
- 10600 – Hypotrix hueco
- 10601 – Hexorthodes accurata
- 10602 – Hexorthodes senatoria
- 10603 – Hexorthodes catalina
- 10603.1 – Hexorthodes citeria
- 10603.2 – Hexorthodes emendata
- 10604 – Hypotrix optima
- 10605 – Eriopyga crista
- 10605.1 – Pseudorthodes iole
- 10605.2 – Fergusonix januaris
- 10606 – Hypotrix lunata
- 10607 – Zosteropoda hirtipes, v-lined Quaker moth
- 10608 – Zosteropoda clementei
- 10609 – Neleucania suavis
- 10610 – Neleucania patricia
- 10611 – Neleucania bicolorata
- 10612 – Neleucania niveicosta
- 10613 – Neleucania praegracilis
- 10614 – Hypotrix ferricola
- 10615 – Hypotrix diplogramma
- 10616 – Hypotrix parallela
- 10616.1 – Hypotrix rubra
- 10617 – Anhypotrix tristis
- 10618 – Trichopolia dentatella
- 10619 – Trichopolia suspicionis
- 10620 – Hypotrix spinosa
- 10620.1 – Hypotrix ocularis
- 10620.2 – Hypotrix basistriga
- 10620.3 – Hypotrix naglei
- 10621 – Trichofeltia circumdata
- 10622 – Mimobarathra antonito
- 10623 – Miodera stigmata
- 10624 – Miodera eureka
- 10625 – Engelhardtia ursina
- 10626 – Tricholita elsinora
- 10627 – Tricholita signata, signate Quaker moth
- 10628 – Tricholita notata
- 10629 – Tricholita baranca
- 10629.1 – Tricholita knudsoni
- 10629.2 – Tricholita ferrisi
- 10630 – Tricholita fistula
- 10631 – Tricholita chipeta
- 10632 – Tricholita bisulca
- 10633 – Marilopteryx lutina
- 10633.1 – Marilopteryx carancahua
- 10634 – Lophoceramica artega
- 10635 – Hydroeciodes juvenilis
- 10636 – Hydroeciodes repleta
- 10637 – Hydroeciodes serrata
- 10638 – Hydroeciodes ochrimacula
- 10639 – Hydroeciodes auripurpura
- 10640 – Xanthopastis timais, Spanish moth
- 10641 – Agrotis vetusta, old man dart moth
- 10642 – Agrotis daedalus
- 10642.1 – Agrotis striata
- 10643 – Eucoptocnemis dollii
- 10643.1 – Eucoptocnemis canescens
- 10644 – Feltia mollis
- 10645 – Agrotis orthogonia
- 10647 – Agrotis ruta
- 10647.1 – Agrotis longicornis
- 10648 – Agrotis gladiaria, swordsman dart moth
- 10649 – Agrotis kingi
- 10650 – Agrotis robustior
- 10651 – Agrotis venerabilis, venerable dart moth
- 10652 – Agrotis vancouverensis
- 10653 – Agrotis gravis
- 10654 – Agrotis buchholzi
- 10658 – Agrotis stigmosa
- 10658.1 – Agrotis arenarius
- 10659 – Agrotis volubilis, voluble dart moth
- 10660 – Agrotis obliqua
- 10660.1 – Agrotis antica
- 10661 – Agrotis malefida, rascal dart moth
- 10662 – Agrotis apicalis
- 10663 – Agrotis ipsilon, ipsilon dart moth
- 10664 – Feltia subterranea, subterranean dart moth
- 10665 – Feltia repleta, replete dart moth
- 10666 – Feltia manifesta
- 10667 – Dichagyris triphaenoides
- 10668 – Agrotis haesitans
- 10669 – Agrotis rileyana
- 10670 – Feltia jaculifera, dingy cutworm moth
- 10670.1 – Feltia inyoca
- 10672 – Feltia evanidalis
- 10674 – Feltia subgothica, subgothic dart moth
- 10675 – Feltia tricosa, confused dart moth
- 10676 – Feltia herilis, Master's dart moth
- 10680 – Feltia geniculata, knee-joint dart moth
- 10680.1 – Feltia floridensis
- 10680.2 – Feltia austrina
- 10681 – Copablepharon grandis
- 10682 – Copablepharon canariana
- 10684 – Copablepharon serrata
- 10684.1 – Copablepharon mustelini
- 10684.2 – Copablepharon serratigrande
- 10686 – Copablepharon gillaspyi
- 10686.1 – Copablepharon pictum
- 10686.2 – Copablepharon nevada
- 10686.3 – Copablepharon mutans
- 10686.4 – Copablepharon columbia
- 10686.5 – Copablepharon alaskensis
- 10687 – Copablepharon viridisparsa
- 10687.1 – Copablepharon robertsoni
- 10689 – Copablepharon longipenne
- 10689.1 – Copablepharon michiganensis
- 10690 – Copablepharon absidum
- 10690.1 – Copablepharon fuscum, sand-verbena moth
- 10690.2 – Copablepharon atrinotum
- 10691 – Copablepharon sanctaemonicae
- 10691.1 – Copablepharon opleri
- 10692 – Protogygia album
- 10692.1 – Protogygia pallida
- 10693 – Copablepharon albisericea
- 10693.1 – Copablepharon spiritum
- 10693.2 – Copablepharon flavum
- 10694 – Eucoptocnemis fimbriaris, fringed dart moth
- 10696 – Eucoptocnemis dapsilis
- 10696.1 – Eucoptocnemis rufula
- 10697 – Eucoptocnemis elingua
- 10698 – Feltia nigrita
- 10698.1 – Feltia woodiana
- 10698.2 – Feltia troubridgei
- 10698.3 – Feltia boreana
- 10698.4 – Feltia beringiana
- 10699 – Dichagyris longidens
- 10700 – Dichagyris dubitata
- 10701 – Dichagyris ruckesi
- 10701.1 – Dichagyris broui
- 10701.2 – Dichagyris reliqua
- 10702 – Euxoa divergens, divergent dart moth
- 10703 – Euxoa sinelinea
- 10704 – Euxoa edictalis
- 10705 – Euxoa messoria, reaper dart moth
- 10706 – Euxoa dissona
- 10706.1 – Euxoa hyperborea
- 10707 – Euxoa westermanni
- 10708 – Euxoa extranea
- 10709 – Euxoa vallus
- 10711 – Euxoa churchillensis
- 10711.1 – Euxoa muldersi
- 10712 – Euxoa macleani
- 10712.1 – Euxoa apopsis
- 10713 – Euxoa chimoensis
- 10714 – Euxoa quebecensis
- 10715 – Euxoa scandens, white cutworm moth
- 10716 – Euxoa aurulenta
- 10717 – Euxoa trifasciata
- 10718 – Euxoa lewisi
- 10720 – Euxoa altens
- 10721 – Euxoa austrina
- 10722 – Euxoa cryptica
- 10722.1 – Euxoa leuschneri
- 10723 – Euxoa tristicula
- 10724 – Euxoa vetusta
- 10725 – Euxoa fuscigerus
- 10726 – Euxoa atomaris
- 10727 – Euxoa pleuritica, fawn brown dart moth
- 10728 – Euxoa pestula
- 10729 – Euxoa simona
- 10729.1 – Euxoa hardwicki
- 10730 – Euxoa adumbrata, sordid dart moth
- 10731 – Euxoa auxiliaris, army cutworm moth
- 10732 – Euxoa inconcinna
- 10733 – Euxoa terrealis
- 10735 – Euxoa shasta
- 10736 – Euxoa biformata
- 10737 – Euxoa intermontana
- 10738 – Euxoa mimallonis, sordid dart moth
- 10739 – Euxoa septentrionalis
- 10740 – Euxoa vernalis
- 10741 – Euxoa olivia
- 10742 – Euxoa terrenus
- 10743 – Euxoa antica
- 10743.1 – Euxoa franclemonti
- 10743.2 – Euxoa absona
- 10744 – Euxoa serricornis
- 10745 – Euxoa tocoyae
- 10746 – Euxoa scotogrammoides
- 10747 – Euxoa annulipes
- 10747.1 – Euxoa emma
- 10748 – Euxoa oncocnemoides
- 10749 – Euxoa intrita
- 10750 – Euxoa rufula
- 10751 – Euxoa silens, silent dart moth
- 10752 – Euxoa pimensis
- 10753 – Euxoa immixta, mixed dart moth
- 10754 – Euxoa simulata
- 10754.1 – Euxoa lafontainei
- 10755 – Euxoa declarata, clear dart moth
- 10756 – Euxoa campestris
- 10757 – Euxoa rockburnei
- 10758 – Euxoa flavidens
- 10759 – Euxoa punctigera
- 10760 – Euxoa aurantiaca
- 10761 – Euxoa stygialis
- 10762 – Euxoa cana
- 10763 – Euxoa spumata
- 10764 – Euxoa stigmatalis
- 10765 – Euxoa pallipennis
- 10765.1 – Euxoa baja
- 10766 – Euxoa misturata
- 10767 – Euxoa melana
- 10768 – Euxoa atristrigata
- 10769 – Euxoa nevada
- 10770 – Euxoa cinereopallidus
- 10771 – Euxoa serotina
- 10772 – Euxoa camalpa
- 10773 – Euxoa maderensis
- 10774 – Euxoa mitis
- 10775 – Euxoa luctuosa
- 10776 – Euxoa aequalis
- 10778 – Euxoa conjuncta
- 10779 – Euxoa cona
- 10780 – Euxoa comosa
- 10781 – Euxoa fumalis
- 10781.1 – Euxoa occidentalis
- 10782 – Euxoa lucida
- 10784 – Euxoa lineifrons
- 10784.1 – Euxoa guadalupensis
- 10785 – Euxoa infausta
- 10786 – Euxoa satis
- 10786.1 – Euxoa faulkneri
- 10787 – Euxoa brunneigera
- 10787.1 – Euxoa excogita
- 10788 – Euxoa bicollaris
- 10789 – Euxoa inyoca
- 10790 – Euxoa selenis
- 10791 – Euxoa piniae
- 10792 – Euxoa satiens
- 10793 – Euxoa scholastica, scholastic dart moth
- 10794 – Euxoa setonia
- 10794.1 – Euxoa pallidimacula
- 10794.2 – Euxoa mojave
- 10795 – Euxoa pluralis
- 10796 – Euxoa bifasciata
- 10797 – Euxoa cinnabarina
- 10798 – Euxoa basalis
- 10799 – Euxoa permixta
- 10800 – Euxoa nostra
- 10801 – Euxoa ochrogaster
- 10802 – Euxoa cursoria
- 10803 – Euxoa velleripennis, fleece-winged dart moth
- 10804 – Euxoa plagigera
- 10805 – Euxoa tessellata, tessellate dart moth
- 10806 – Euxoa henrietta
- 10807 – Euxoa albipennis
- 10808 – Euxoa lillooet
- 10809 – Euxoa catenula
- 10810 – Euxoa violaris, violet dart moth
- 10811 – Euxoa siccata
- 10812 – Euxoa bostoniensis, Boston dart moth
- 10813 – Euxoa medialis, median-banded dart moth
- 10814 – Euxoa ustulata
- 10815 – Euxoa sculptilis
- 10816 – Euxoa perexcellens
- 10817 – Euxoa obeliscoides, obelisk dart moth
- 10818 – Euxoa oberfoelli
- 10819 – Euxoa choris
- 10820 – Euxoa hollemani
- 10820.1 – Euxoa subandera
- 10821 – Euxoa xasta
- 10823 – Euxoa cincta
- 10823.1 – Euxoa coconino
- 10824 – Euxoa brevipennis
- 10825 – Euxoa costata
- 10825.1 – Euxoa castanea
- 10826 – Euxoa idahoensis
- 10826.1 – Euxoa furtivus
- 10827 – Euxoa clausa
- 10828 – Euxoa foeminalis
- 10829 – Euxoa laetificans
- 10830 – Euxoa quadridentata
- 10830.1 – Euxoa inscripta
- 10831 – Euxoa niveilinea
- 10832 – Euxoa agema
- 10833 – Euxoa olivalis
- 10834 – Euxoa oblongistigma
- 10835 – Euxoa melura
- 10836 – Euxoa dargo
- 10837 – Euxoa unica
- 10838 – Euxoa detersa, rubbed dart moth
- 10839 – Euxoa cicatricosa
- 10840 – Euxoa recula
- 10841 – Euxoa citricolor
- 10842 – Euxoa tronellus
- 10843 – Euxoa teleboa
- 10845 – Euxoa difformis
- 10846 – Euxoa murdocki
- 10847 – Euxoa moerens
- 10848 – Euxoa latro
- 10849 – Euxoa dodi
- 10850 – Euxoa infracta
- 10851 – Euxoa redimicula, fillet dart moth
- 10852 – Euxoa auripennis
- 10854 – Euxoa servitus, slave dart moth
- 10855 – Euxoa munis
- 10856 – Euxoa montana
- 10857 – Euxoa taura
- 10859 – Euxoa macrodentata
- 10860 – Euxoa perolivalis
- 10861 – Euxoa ridingsiana
- 10862 – Euxoa aberrans
- 10863 – Euxoa manitobana
- 10864 – Euxoa flavicollis
- 10864.1 – Euxoa maimes
- 10865 – Euxoa perpolita, polished dart moth
- 10866 – Euxoa nomas
- 10867 – Euxoa wilsoni
- 10868 – Euxoa riversii
- 10869 – Dichagyris grotei
- 10870 – Dichagyris acclivis
- 10870.1 – Dichagyris cataclivis
- 10871 – Dichagyris proclivis
- 10872 – Dichagyris neoclivis
- 10873 – Dichagyris salina
- 10873.1 – Dichagyris arabella
- 10874 – Dichagyris socorro
- 10875 – Dichagyris polycala
- 10876 – Dichagyris capota
- 10876.1 – Dichagyris mizteca
- 10877 – Dichagyris timbor
- 10878 – Striacosta albicosta, western bean cutworm moth
- 10879 – Richia serano
- 10879.1 – Richia herculeana
- 10880 – Dichagyris kyune
- 10881 – Richia chortalis
- 10882 – Richia parentalis
- 10884 – Dichagyris lobato
- 10885 – Dichagyris madida
- 10886 – Dichagyris larga
- 10887 – Dichagyris cyminopristes
- 10888 – Dichagyris pyrsogramma
- 10889 – Dichagyris variabilis
- 10890 – Dichagyris grandipennis
- 10891 – Ochropleura implecta, flame-shouldered dart moth
- 10892 – Protogygia lagena
- 10892.1 – Protogygia postera
- 10892.2 – Protogygia rufescens
- 10893 – Protogygia enalaga
- 10894 – Protogygia querula
- 10895 – Protogygia comstocki
- 10896 – Protogygia polingi
- 10896.1 – Protogygia pectinata
- 10896.2 – Protogygia whitesandsensis
- 10898 – Protogygia milleri
- 10899 – Protogygia biclavis
- 10900 – Protogygia elevata
- 10900.1 – Protogygia arena
- 10900.2 – Protogygia alberta
- 10901 – Anicla lubricans, slippery dart moth
- 10901.1 – Anicla sullivani
- 10902 – Anicla forbesi
- 10903 – Anicla illapsa, snowy dart moth
- 10904 – Anicla beata
- 10904.1 – Anicla mus
- 10905 – Anicla exuberans
- 10907 – Anicla simplicius
- 10908 – Anicla digna
- 10908.1 – Anicla biformata
- 10909 – Anicla tenuescens
- 10910 – Anicla tepperi
- 10910.1 – Anicla espoetia
- 10911 – Anicla infecta, green cutworm moth
- 10912 – Anicla cemolia
- 10913 – Euxoa bochus
- 10914 – Hemieuxoa rudens
- 10915 – Peridroma saucia, variegated cutworm moth
- 10916 – Diarsia calgary
- 10917 – Diarsia rubifera, red dart moth
- 10918 – Diarsia dislocata
- 10919 – Diarsia jucunda, smaller pinkish dart moth
- 10920 – Diarsia esurialis
- 10921 – Diarsia rosaria
- 10923 – Actebia balanitis
- 10924 – Actebia fennica, Finland dart moth
- 10925 – Rhyacia quadrangula
- 10925.1 – Rhyacia clemens
- 10926 – Spaelotis clandestina, clandestine dart moth
- 10926.1 – Spaelotis bicava
- 10926.2 – Spaelotis unicava
- 10927 – Spaelotis havilae
- 10927.1 – Spaelotis velicava
- 10927.2 – Spaelotis quadricava
- 10928 – Graphiphora augur, double dart moth
- 10929 – Eurois occulta, great brocade moth
- 10930 – Eurois astricta
- 10931 – Eurois nigra
- 10933 – Richia praefixa
- 10934 – Xestia liquidaria
- 10935 – Parabarrovia keelei
- 10935.1 – Parabarrovia omilaki
- 10935.2 – Parabarrovia ogilviensis
- 10936 – Xestia tecta
- 10937 – Xestia wockei
- 10938 – Xestia scropulana
- 10939 – Xestia okakensis
- 10939.1 – Xestia lorezi
- 10941 – Xestia bolteri
- 10942 – Xestia c-nigrum, lesser black-letter dart moth
- 10942.1 – Xestia dolosa, greater black-letter dart moth
- 10943 – Xestia normanianus, Norman's dart moth
- 10944 – Xestia smithii, Smith's dart moth
- 10945 – Xestia xanthographa, square-spot rustic moth
- 10946 – Xestia conchis
- 10947 – Xestia oblata, rosy dart moth
- 10948 – Prognorisma substrigata
- 10949 – Xestia cinerascens
- 10950 – Pseudohermonassa bicarnea, pink-spotted dart moth
- 10951 – Pseudohermonassa tenuicula, Morrison's sooty dart moth
- 10952 – Pseudohermonassa flavotincta
- 10953 – Pseudohermonassa ononensis
- 10954 – Agnorisma bugrai, collared dart moth
- 10955 – Agnorisma badinodis, pale-banded dart moth
- 10956 – Agnorisma bollii
- 10957 – Xestia atrata
- 10958 – Xestia fabulosa
- 10959 – Xestia speciosa
- 10959.1 – Xestia mixta
- 10962 – Xestia perquiritata
- 10963 – Xestia lupa
- 10963.1 – Xestia laxa
- 10964 – Xestia homogena
- 10965 – Xestia imperita
- 10966 – Xestia albuncula
- 10966.1 – Xestia ursae
- 10967 – Xestia elimata, southern variable dart moth
- 10968 – Xestia badicollis, northern variable dart moth
- 10968.1 – Xestia praevia, praevia dart moth
- 10969 – Xestia dilucida, dull reddish dart moth
- 10969.1 – Xestia intermedia
- 10969.2 – Xestia thula
- 10971 – Xestia mustelina
- 10972 – Xestia infimatis
- 10972.1 – Xestia finatimis
- 10973 – Xestia vernilis
- 10973.1 – Xestia verniloides
- 10975 – Setagrotis pallidicollis
- 10975.1 – Setagrotis vocalis
- 10976 – Setagrotis radiola
- 10977 – Tesagrotis atrifrons
- 10978 – Tesagrotis piscipellis
- 10978.1 – Tesagrotis corrodera
- 10978.2 – Tesagrotis amia
- 10980 – Xestia staudingeri
- 10980.1 – Xestia inuitica
- 10981 – Xestia maculata
- 10982 – Xestia colorado
- 10983 – Xestia alaskae
- 10984 – Xestia aequaeva
- 10985 – Xestia quieta
- 10986 – Xestia bryanti
- 10986.1 – Xestia lyngei
- 10986.2 – Xestia woodi
- 10986.3 – Xestia fergusoni
- 10987.1 – Xestia kolymae
- 10988 – Coenophila opacifrons, blueberry dart moth
- 10989 – Adelphagrotis stellaris
- 10991 – Adelphagrotis indeterminata
- 10991.1 – Adelphagrotis carissima
- 10992 – Paradiarsia littoralis
- 10993 – Hemipachnobia subporphyrea
- 10993.1 – Hemipachnobia monochromatea
- 10994 – Cerastis tenebrifera, reddish speckled dart moth
- 10995 – Cerastis cornuta
- 10995.1 – Cerastis robertsoni
- 10995.2 – Cerastis enigmatica, enigmatic dart moth
- 10995.3 – Cerastis gloriosa
- 10996 – Cerastis salicarum, willow dart moth
- 10997 – Cerastis fishii
- 10998 – Choephora fungorum, bent-line dart moth
- 10999 – Aplectoides condita
- 11000 – Anaplectoides prasina, green arches moth
- 11001 – Anaplectoides pressus, dappled dart moth
- 11002 – Anaplectoides brunneomedia, brown-lined dart moth
- 11003 – Chersotis juncta
- 11003.1 – Noctua pronuba, large yellow underwing moth
- 11003.2 – Noctua comes, lesser yellow underwing moth
- 11004 – Protolampra rufipectus
- 11006 – Protolampra brunneicollis, brown-collared dart moth
- 11007 – Eueretagrotis sigmoides, sigmoid dart moth
- 11008 – Eueretagrotis perattentus, two-spot dart moth
- 11009 – Eueretagrotis attentus, attentive dart moth
- 11010 – Lycophotia phyllophora, lycophotia moth
- 11011 – Xestia plebeia
- 11012 – Cryptocala acadiensis, catocaline dart moth
- 11013 – Abagrotis erratica
- 11014 – Abagrotis kirkwoodi
- 11015 – Abagrotis alcandola
- 11016 – Abagrotis vittifrons
- 11017 – Abagrotis bimarginalis
- 11018 – Abagrotis trigona
- 11019 – Abagrotis mirabilis
- 11020 – Abagrotis rubricundis
- 11021 – Abagrotis striata
- 11022 – Abagrotis glenni
- 11023 – Abagrotis hennei
- 11024 – Abagrotis nefascia
- 11025 – Abagrotis alampeta
- 11025.1 – Abagrotis petalama
- 11026 – Abagrotis denticulata
- 11027 – Abagrotis orbis
- 11028 – Abagrotis baueri
- 11029 – Abagrotis alternata, greater red dart moth
- 11029.1 – Abagrotis mexicana
- 11029.2 – Abagrotis forbesi
- 11030 – Abagrotis turbulenta
- 11030.1 – Abagrotis hermina
- 11032 – Abagrotis variata
- 11033 – Abagrotis scopeops
- 11035 – Abagrotis discoidalis
- 11036 – Abagrotis pulchrata
- 11037 – Abagrotis apposita
- 11038 – Abagrotis nanalis
- 11039 – Abagrotis duanca
- 11040 – Abagrotis reedi
- 11041 – Abagrotis placida
- 11042 – Abagrotis dodi
- 11042.1 – Abagrotis dickeli
- 11043 – Abagrotis cupida, Cupid dart moth
- 11043.1 – Abagrotis magnicupida
- 11044 – Abagrotis brunneipennis
- 11044.1 – Abagrotis cryptica
- 11045 – Abagrotis anchocelioides, blueberry budworm moth
- 11046 – Abagrotis belfragei
- 11047 – Parabagrotis exsertistigma
- 11047.1 – Parabagrotis formalis
- 11047.2 – Parabagrotis insularis
- 11047.3 – Parabagrotis cupidissima
- 11048 – Parabagrotis sulinaris
- 11049 – Pronoctua typica
- 11050 – Pronoctua pyrophiloides
- 11050.1 – Pronoctua peabodyae
- 11050.2 – Pronoctua craboi
- 11050.3 – Isochlora sericea
- 11051 – Ufeus satyricus, Grote's satyr moth
- 11052 – Ufeus plicatus
- 11052.1 – Ufeus hulstii
- 11053 – Ufeus faunus
- no number yet – Ufeus felsensteini
- 11055 – Derrima stellata, pink star moth
- 11056 W – Microhelia angelica
- 11058 W – Heliothodes diminutiva, small heliothodes moth
- 11061 – Baptarma felicita
- 11062 W – Eutricopis nexilis, white-spotted midget moth
- 11063 – Pyrrhia cilisca, bordered sallow moth
- 11064 – Pyrrhia exprimens, purple-lined sallow moth
- 11065 – Pyrrhia aurantiago, orange sallow moth
- 11066 W – Psectrotarsia suavis
- 11067 W – Psectrotarsia hebardi
- 11068 – Helicoverpa zea, corn earworm moth
- 11070 – Heliothis subflexa, subflexus straw moth
- 11071 – Heliothis virescens, tobacco budworm moth
- 11072 – Heliothis phloxiphaga, darker spotted straw moth
- 11072.1 – Heliothis acesias
- 11072.2 W – Heliothis australis
- 11073 – Heliocheilus turbata, spotted straw moth
- 11073.1 – Heliocheilus lupatus, lupatus straw moth
- 11074 – Heliocheilus paradoxus, paradoxical grass moth
- 11075 W – Heliocheilus julia
- 11076 W – Heliocheilus toralis
- 11077 W – Heliothis ononis, flax bollworm moth
- 11078 W – Heliothis oregonica, Oregon gem moth
- 11079 W – Heliothis proruptus
- 11080 W – Heliothis belladonna
- 11081 – Heliothis borealis
- 11082 – Schinia nuchalis
- 11083 W – Schinia villosa
- 11083.1 – Schinia sexata
- 11083.2 W – Schinia intermontana
- 11086 W – Schinia graefiana
- 11087 W – Schinia vacciniae
- 11088 W – Schinia suetus
- 11088.1 W – Schinia aetheria
- 11089 W – Schinia aurantiaca
- 11090 W – Schinia amaryllis
- 11091 W – Schinia perminuta, western small flower moth
- 11092 W – Schinia roseitincta
- 11093 W – Schinia antonio
- 11094 W – Schinia carminatra
- 11095 – Schinia indiana, phlox moth
- 11096 W – Schinia scarletina
- 11097 W – Schinia pulchripennis
- 11098 – Schinia scissa
- 11099 – Schinia scissoides, divided flower moth
- 11100 W – Schinia avemensis
- 11101 W – Schinia dobla
- 11102 W – Schinia honesta
- 11102.1 W – Schinia verna
- 11103 W – Schinia persimilis
- 11103.1 W – Schinia macneilli
- 11104 – Schinia spinosae, spinose flower moth
- 11104.1 – Schinia subspinosae
- 11105 – Schinia bina, bina flower moth
- 11106 W – Schinia volupia, painted schinia moth
- 11107 – Schinia fulleri
- 11107.1 – Schinia sanrafaeli
- 11108 – Schinia masoni, gaillardia flower moth
- 11110 – Schinia septentrionalis, northern flower moth
- 11112 W – Schinia sordidus, sordid flower moth
- 11113 – Schinia petulans
- 11115 W – Schinia siren, alluring schinia moth
- 11115.1 W – Schinia varix
- 11116 – Schinia tuberculum, golden aster flower moth
- 11116.1 – Schinia rufipenna
- 11117 – Schinia lynx, lynx flower moth
- 11118 – Schinia obscurata, erigeron flower moth
- 11120 – Schinia parmeliana
- 11122 W – Schinia bicuspida
- 11124 W – Schinia errans
- 11125 W – Schinia biforma
- 11127 W – Schinia ultima
- 11128 – Schinia arcigera, arcigera flower moth
- 11130 – Schinia olivacea
- 11131 – Schinia mortua
- 11132 – Schinia jaguarina, jaguar flower moth
- 11132.1 – Schinia hardwickorum
- 11133 – Schinia edwardsii
- 11133.1 W – Schinia angulilinea
- 11134 W – Schinia cupes
- 11134.1 W – Schinia crotchii
- 11134.2 W – Schinia deserticola
- 11134.3 W – Schinia mexicana
- 11134.4 W – Schinia carrizoensis, carrizo flower moth
- 11135 – Schinia rivulosa, ragweed flower moth
- 11136 – Schinia hanga
- 11137 – Schinia nubila, camphorweed flower moth
- 11140 – Schinia saturata, brown flower moth
- 11140.1 – Schinia psamathea
- 11141 – Schinia thoreaui, Thoreau's flower moth
- 11146 W – Schinia buta
- 11147 – Schinia gracilenta, slender flower moth
- 11148 – Schinia oleagina
- 11148.1 – Schinia grandimedia
- 11149 – Schinia trifascia, three-lined flower moth
- 11150 W – Schinia accessa
- 11150.1 W – Schinia acutilinea
- 11151 W – Schinia sexplagiata
- 11152 W – Schinia tobia
- 11153 W – Schinia velaris
- 11155 W – Schinia miniana, desert marigold moth
- 11157 W – Schinia biundulata
- 11157.1 W – Schinia immaculata
- 11159 W – Schinia intrabilis
- 11160 W – Schinia ligeae
- 11161 E – Schinia jaegeri
- 11162 W – Schinia simplex
- 11163 W – Schinia felicitata
- 11163.1 – Schinia lynda
- 11164 – Schinia florida, primrose moth
- 11166 W – Schinia regia
- 11166.1 – Schinia regina, reginia primrose moth
- 11167 W – Schinia niveicosta
- 11168 – Schinia gaurae, clouded crimson moth
- 11169 – Schinia mitis
- 11170 – Schinia illustra
- 11173 – Schinia sanguinea, bleeding flower moth
- 11173.1 – Schinia carmosina
- 11174 – Schinia lucens, leadplant flower moth
- 11175 W – Schinia meadi, Mead's flower moth
- 11176 W – Schinia zuni
- 11177 – Schinia nundina, goldenrod flower moth
- 11178 – Schinia arefacta, arefacta flower moth
- 11179 W – Schinia tertia
- 11180 W – Schinia argentifascia
- 11181 W – Schinia albafascia
- 11181.1 W – Schinia ferrisi
- 11182 – Schinia brunnea
- 11182.1 W – Schinia erosa
- 11183 W – Schinia diffusa
- 11184 W – Schinia walsinghami
- 11185 W – Schinia crenilinea, creniline flower moth
- 11187 W – Schinia coercita
- 11188 W – Schinia unimacula, rabbitbush flower moth
- 11188.1 – Schinia maculata
- 11192 W – Schinia cumatilis
- 11193 – Schinia hulstia, Hulst's flower moth
- 11195 W – Schinia reniformis
- 11196 W – Schinia obliqua
- 11197 W – Schinia oculata
- 11198 – Schinia alencis
- 11199 – Schinia chrysellus, chrysellus flower moth
- 11199.1 – Schinia chryselloides
- 11200 W – Schinia ciliata
- 11200.1 – Schinia rufocostulata
- 11201 – Schinia bimatris
- 11202 – Schinia carolinensis
- 11203 W – Schinia luxa
- 11204 W – Schinia citrinellus
- 11204.2 – Schinia mcfarlandi
- 11206 W – Schinia snowi
- 11207 W – Heliolonche modicella
- 11208 W – Heliolonche carolus
- 11209 W – Heliolonche celeris
- 11210 W – Heliolonche pictipennis
- 11210.1 – Heliolonche joaquinensis
- 11212 W – Melaporphyria immortua
- 11213 – Grotella septempunctata
- 11214 – Grotella harveyi
- 11215 – Grotella sampita
- 11216 – Grotella blanca
- 11217 – Grotella dis
- 11218 – Grotella parvipuncta
- 11219 – Grotella stretchi
- 11220 – Grotella vagans
- 11221 – Grotella binda
- 11222 – Grotella tricolor
- 11223 – Grotella soror
- 11224 – Grotella margueritaria
- 11225 – Grotella grisescens
- 11226 – Grotella olivacea
- 11227 – Grotella citronella
- 11228 – Grotella vauriae
- 11229 – Grotella blanchardi
- 11230 – Hemigrotella argenteostriata
- 11231 – Neogrotella confusa
- 11232 – Neogrotella spaldingi
- 11233 – Neogrotella macdunnoughi

== See also ==
- List of butterflies of North America
- List of Lepidoptera of Hawaii
- List of moths of Canada
- List of butterflies of Canada
