= Eucoptocnemis dollii =

Scientific classification
- Kingdom: Animalia
- Phylum: Arthropoda
- Class: Insecta
- Order: Lepidoptera
- Superfamily: Noctuoidea
- Family: Noctuidae
- Genus: Eucoptocnemis
- Species: E. dollii

Binomial name
- Eucoptocnemis dollii (Grote, 1882)

Species of moth

Eucoptocnemis dollii is a species of cutworm or dart moth in the family Noctuidae. Eucoptocnemis dollii was previously classified in the genus Agrotis. The MONA or Hodges number for Eucoptocnemis dollii is 10643.

== Description ==
The adult Eucoptocnemis dollii can be identified by its grayish-brown forewings, which lack distinct lines. The forewings display a diffuse pattern of lighter and darker scales with minimal contrast against the ground color. The reniform spot is faint, and slightly darker grayish shading is present in the terminal area, along the costa near the apex, and along the inner margin near the base. The hindwings are white with gray scaling along the veins. The wingspan is approximately 35 mm.
