= Eucoptocnemis dolli =

Scientific classification
- Kingdom: Animalia
- Phylum: Arthropoda
- Class: Insecta
- Order: Lepidoptera
- Superfamily: Noctuoidea
- Family: Noctuidae
- Genus: Eucoptocnemis
- Species: E. dolli

Binomial name
- Eucoptocnemis dolli Grote, 1882

Synonyms
- Agrotis dolli; Agrotis dollii; Porosagrotis dolli

Species of moth

Eucoptocnemis dolli is a species of moth of the family Noctuidae. It is found in Arizona and California.

The wingspan is about 35 mm. Adults are on wing in fall.
