= Azeta schausi =

Scientific classification
- Kingdom: Animalia
- Phylum: Arthropoda
- Class: Insecta
- Order: Lepidoptera
- Superfamily: Noctuoidea
- Family: Erebidae
- Genus: Azeta
- Species: A. schausi

Binomial name
- Azeta schausi (Barnes & Benjamin, 1924)

Species of moth

Azeta schausi is a species of moth in the family Erebidae first described by William Barnes and Foster Hendrickson Benjamin in 1924. It is found in North America.

The MONA or Hodges number for Azeta schausi is 8576.
