= Eucoptocnemis elingua =

Scientific classification
- Kingdom: Animalia
- Phylum: Arthropoda
- Clade: Pancrustacea
- Class: Insecta
- Order: Lepidoptera
- Superfamily: Noctuoidea
- Family: Noctuidae
- Tribe: Noctuini
- Subtribe: Agrotina
- Genus: Eucoptocnemis
- Species: E. elingua

Binomial name
- Eucoptocnemis elingua (Smith, 1903)

Species of moth

Eucoptocnemis elingua is a species of cutworm or dart moth in the family Noctuidae.
