= Eucoptocnemis fimbriaris =

Fringed dart

Scientific classification
- Kingdom: Animalia
- Phylum: Arthropoda
- Class: Insecta
- Order: Lepidoptera
- Superfamily: Noctuoidea
- Family: Noctuidae
- Tribe: Noctuini
- Subtribe: Agrotina
- Genus: Eucoptocnemis
- Species: E. fimbriaris

Binomial name
- Eucoptocnemis fimbriaris (Guenee, 1852)

Synonyms
- Eucoptocnemis tripars (Walker, 1856)

Species of moth

Eucoptocnemis fimbriaris, the fringed dart, is a species of cutworm or dart moth in the family Noctuidae. It is found in North America.

The MONA or Hodges number for Eucoptocnemis fimbriaris is 10694.
