= Eucoptocnemis dapsilis =

Scientific classification
- Kingdom: Animalia
- Phylum: Arthropoda
- Class: Insecta
- Order: Lepidoptera
- Superfamily: Noctuoidea
- Family: Noctuidae
- Genus: Eucoptocnemis
- Species: E. dapsilis

Binomial name
- Eucoptocnemis dapsilis (Grote, 1882)

Species of moth

Eucoptocnemis dapsilis is a species of cutworm or dart moth in the family Noctuidae. It is found in North America.

The MONA or Hodges number for Eucoptocnemis dapsilis is 10696.
