= Eucoptocnemis =

Scientific classification
- Kingdom: Animalia
- Phylum: Arthropoda
- Class: Insecta
- Order: Lepidoptera
- Superfamily: Noctuoidea
- Family: Noctuidae
- Subtribe: Agrotina
- Genus: Eucoptocnemis; Grote 1874

Genus of moths

Eucoptocnemis is a genus of moths of the family Noctuidae.

== Selected species ==
- Eucoptocnemis canescens Lafontaine, 2004
- Eucoptocnemis dapsilis (Grote, 1882)
- Eucoptocnemis elingua (Smith, 1903)
- Eucoptocnemis dolli Grote, 1882 (formerly Agrotis dolli)
- Eucoptocnemis fimbriaris (Guenée, 1852) (syn: Eucoptocnemis tripars (Walker, 1856))
- Eucoptocnemis rufula Lafontaine, 2004
