= Sympistis ragani =

Scientific classification
- Kingdom: Animalia
- Phylum: Arthropoda
- Clade: Pancrustacea
- Class: Insecta
- Order: Lepidoptera
- Superfamily: Noctuoidea
- Family: Noctuidae
- Genus: Sympistis
- Species: S. ragani

Binomial name
- Sympistis ragani Barnes, 1928

Synonyms
- Oncocnemis ragani

Species of moth

Sympistis ragani is a moth of the family Noctuidae first described by William Barnes in 1928. It is endemic to the Klamath Mountains of northwestern California and southwestern Oregon, and the Oregon Coast Range.

It is the largest of six similar gray Pacific Northwest species in the Sympistis atricollaris species group that have a black H-shaped pattern of antemedial and postmedial lines that are connected by a line across the median area. The moth's wingspan is 30–35 mm.
