= Sympistis baloghi =

Scientific classification
- Kingdom: Animalia
- Phylum: Arthropoda
- Clade: Pancrustacea
- Class: Insecta
- Order: Lepidoptera
- Superfamily: Noctuoidea
- Family: Noctuidae
- Genus: Sympistis
- Species: S. baloghi

Binomial name
- Sympistis baloghi Troubridge, 2008

Species of moth

Sympistis baloghi is a moth of the family Noctuidae first described by James T. Troubridge in 2008. It is found in the US in south central New Mexico. It is known from only one female specimen.

The wingspan is about 34 mm. Adults are on wing in June.
