= Sympistis heterogena =

Scientific classification
- Kingdom: Animalia
- Phylum: Arthropoda
- Clade: Pancrustacea
- Class: Insecta
- Order: Lepidoptera
- Superfamily: Noctuoidea
- Family: Noctuidae
- Genus: Sympistis
- Species: S. heterogena

Binomial name
- Sympistis heterogena (A. Blanchard, 1972)

Species of moth

Sympistis heterogena is a species of moth in the family Noctuidae (the owlet moths).
