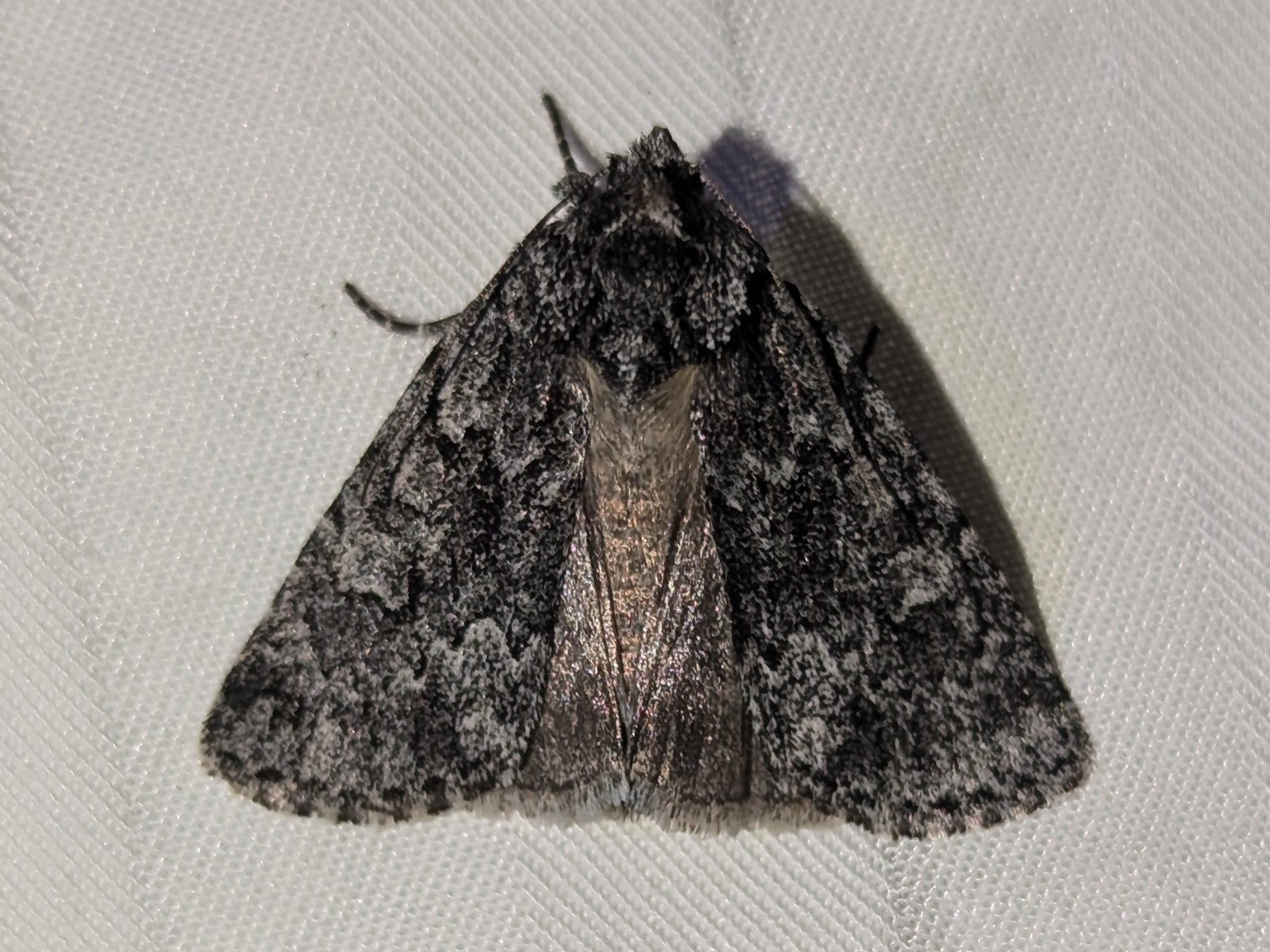

Scientific classification
- Domain: Eukaryota
- Kingdom: Animalia
- Phylum: Arthropoda
- Class: Insecta
- Order: Lepidoptera
- Superfamily: Noctuoidea
- Family: Noctuidae
- Genus: Sympistis
- Species: S. anweileri

Binomial name
- Sympistis anweileri Troubridge & Lafontaine, 2008

= Sympistis anweileri =

Species of moth

Sympistis anweileri is a species of moth in the family Noctuidae that was first described by James T. Troubridge and J. Donald Lafontaine in 2008. It is found in western North America from Alberta to British Columbia to Montana at altitudes of 2,000 to 8,000 feet.

It is found in mountainous areas, from the tree-line to valleys, as well as in dry forests.

The wingspan is 30–36 mm. Adults are on wing from mid-July to late August.
