= Sympistis perscripta =

Scientific classification
- Kingdom: Animalia
- Phylum: Arthropoda
- Class: Insecta
- Order: Lepidoptera
- Superfamily: Noctuoidea
- Family: Noctuidae
- Genus: Sympistis
- Species: S. perscripta

Binomial name
- Sympistis perscripta (Guenée, 1852)

Species of moth

Sympistis perscripta, the scribbled sallow moth is a moth of the family Noctuidae that is native to North America. It is listed as a species of special concern in the US states of Connecticut and Massachusetts. It was described by Achille Guenée in 1852. The larval hosts are Antirrhinum, Linaria, and Nuttallanthus.
