= Sympistis apis =

Scientific classification
- Kingdom: Animalia
- Phylum: Arthropoda
- Class: Insecta
- Order: Lepidoptera
- Superfamily: Noctuoidea
- Family: Noctuidae
- Genus: Sympistis
- Species: S. apis

Binomial name
- Sympistis apis Troubridge, 2008

Species of moth

Sympistis apis is a moth of the family Noctuidae first described by James T. Troubridge in 2008. It is found on the plains of northern Texas in the United States.

The wingspan is 26–32 mm. Adults are on wing from late September to early October.
