= Sympistis hayesi =

Scientific classification
- Domain: Eukaryota
- Kingdom: Animalia
- Phylum: Arthropoda
- Class: Insecta
- Order: Lepidoptera
- Superfamily: Noctuoidea
- Family: Noctuidae
- Genus: Sympistis
- Species: S. hayesi

Binomial name
- Sympistis hayesi Grote, 1873

Synonyms
- Oncocnemis hayesi

Species of moth

Sympistis hayesi is a moth of the family Noctuidae first described by Augustus Radcliffe Grote in 1873. It is found in the Rocky Mountain region of North America.

The wingspan is about 30 mm.
