= Sympistis deceptiva =

Scientific classification
- Domain: Eukaryota
- Kingdom: Animalia
- Phylum: Arthropoda
- Class: Insecta
- Order: Lepidoptera
- Superfamily: Noctuoidea
- Family: Noctuidae
- Genus: Sympistis
- Species: S. deceptiva

Binomial name
- Sympistis deceptiva (Barnes & Lindsey, 1922)

Species of moth

Sympistis deceptiva is a species of moth in the family Noctuidae (the owlet moths). It was first described by William Barnes and Arthur Ward Lindsey in 1922 and it is found in North America.

The MONA or Hodges number for Sympistis deceptiva is 10088.
