= Sympistis induta =

Scientific classification
- Domain: Eukaryota
- Kingdom: Animalia
- Phylum: Arthropoda
- Class: Insecta
- Order: Lepidoptera
- Superfamily: Noctuoidea
- Family: Noctuidae
- Genus: Sympistis
- Species: S. induta

Binomial name
- Sympistis induta (Harvey, 1874)

Species of moth

Sympistis induta is a species of moth in the family Noctuidae (the owlet moths).

The MONA or Hodges number for Sympistis induta is 10060.
