= Sympistis subsimplex =

Scientific classification
- Kingdom: Animalia
- Phylum: Arthropoda
- Class: Insecta
- Order: Lepidoptera
- Superfamily: Noctuoidea
- Family: Noctuidae
- Genus: Sympistis
- Species: S. subsimplex

Binomial name
- Sympistis subsimplex (Dyar, 1904)

Synonyms
- Oxycnemis subsimplex Dyar, 1904

Species of moth

Sympistis subsimplex is a moth of the family Noctuidae first described by Harrison Gray Dyar Jr. in 1904. It is found in North America, including Arizona.

The wingspan is 24–27 mm (0.94–1.06 in).
