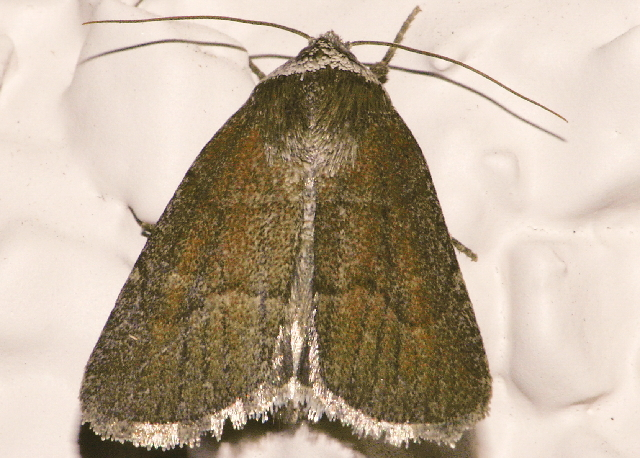

Scientific classification
- Domain: Eukaryota
- Kingdom: Animalia
- Phylum: Arthropoda
- Class: Insecta
- Order: Lepidoptera
- Superfamily: Noctuoidea
- Family: Noctuidae
- Genus: Sympistis
- Species: S. stabilis

Binomial name
- Sympistis stabilis (Smith, 1895)

= Sympistis stabilis =

Species of moth

Sympistis stabilis, the brown sallow, is a species of moth in the family Noctuidae (the owlet moths).

The MONA or Hodges number for Sympistis stabilis is 10062.
