= Sympistis fifia =

Scientific classification
- Kingdom: Animalia
- Phylum: Arthropoda
- Class: Insecta
- Order: Lepidoptera
- Superfamily: Noctuoidea
- Family: Noctuidae
- Genus: Sympistis
- Species: S. fifia

Binomial name
- Sympistis fifia (Dyar, 1904)

Species of moth

Sympistis fifia is a species of moth in the family Noctuidae (the owlet moths).

The MONA or Hodges number for Sympistis fifia is 10066.
