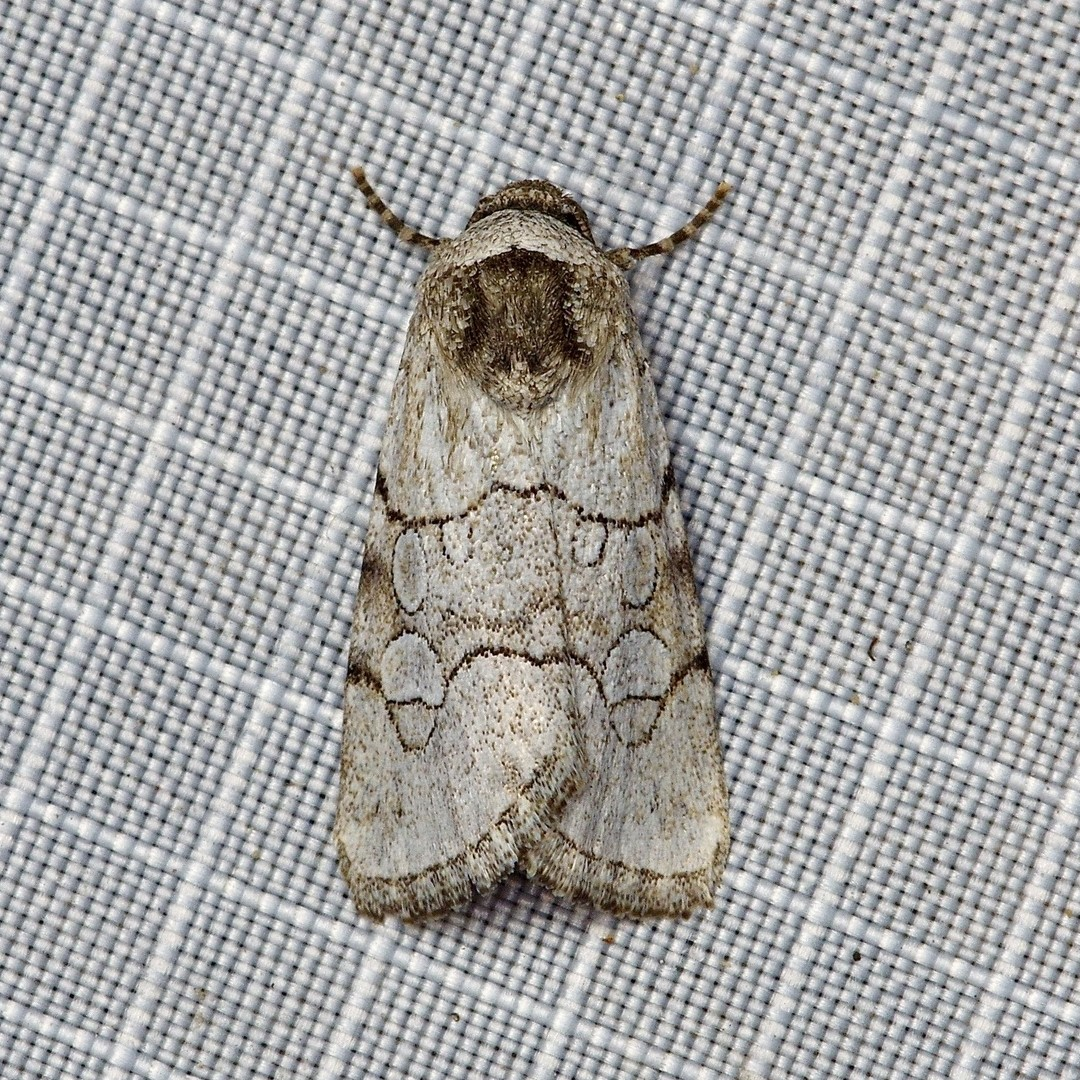

Scientific classification
- Kingdom: Animalia
- Phylum: Arthropoda
- Clade: Pancrustacea
- Class: Insecta
- Order: Lepidoptera
- Superfamily: Noctuoidea
- Family: Noctuidae
- Genus: Sympistis
- Species: S. sectilis

Binomial name
- Sympistis sectilis (Smith, 1894)

Synonyms
- Oncocnemis sectilis Smith, 1894; Oxycnemis sectilis

= Sympistis sectilis =

Species of moth

Sympistis sectilis is a species of moth in the family Noctuidae that was first described by John Bernhardt Smith in 1894. It is found in North America, including Texas.

The wingspan is 22–24 mm.
