= Sympistis dunbari =

Scientific classification
- Kingdom: Animalia
- Phylum: Arthropoda
- Class: Insecta
- Order: Lepidoptera
- Superfamily: Noctuoidea
- Family: Noctuidae
- Genus: Sympistis
- Species: S. dunbari

Binomial name
- Sympistis dunbari (Harvey, 1876)

Synonyms
- Litholomia dunbari; Oncocnemis dunbari

Species of moth

Sympistis dunbari is a moth of the family Noctuidae first described by Leon F. Harvey in 1876. It is found in wet coastal forests of North America, west of the Cascade Mountains, as far north as British Columbia, south to Utah, California and Arizona.

Oncocnemis definita, was formerly considered a synonym of Oncocnemis dunbari, but is now considered a separate species, Sympistis definita.

The wingspan is about 34 mm.

The larvae feed on the foliage of Holodiscus discolor.

If disturbed, the caterpillar of this species will leap two or three inches upwards.
