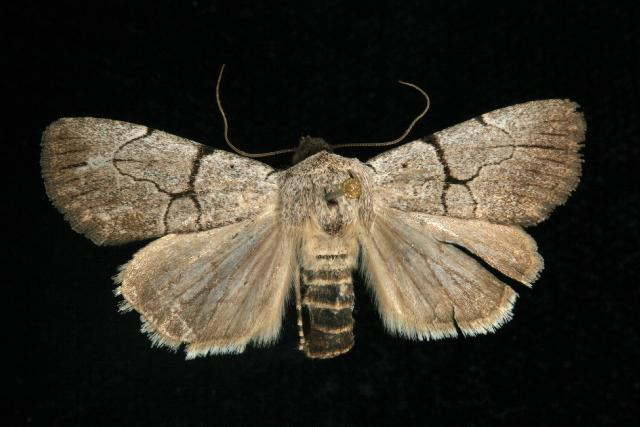

Scientific classification
- Domain: Eukaryota
- Kingdom: Animalia
- Phylum: Arthropoda
- Class: Insecta
- Order: Lepidoptera
- Superfamily: Noctuoidea
- Family: Noctuidae
- Genus: Sympistis
- Species: S. greyi

Binomial name
- Sympistis greyi Troubridge & Crabo, 1998

Synonyms
- Oncocnemis greyi

= Sympistis greyi =

Species of moth

Sympistis greyi is a moth of the family Noctuidae first described by James T. Troubridge and Lars G. Crabo in 1998. It is found in western North America from British Columbia, south through central Washington and central Oregon.

The species is named for L. Paul Grey.

The wingspan is about 30 mm. The length of the forewings is 12–14 mm.
