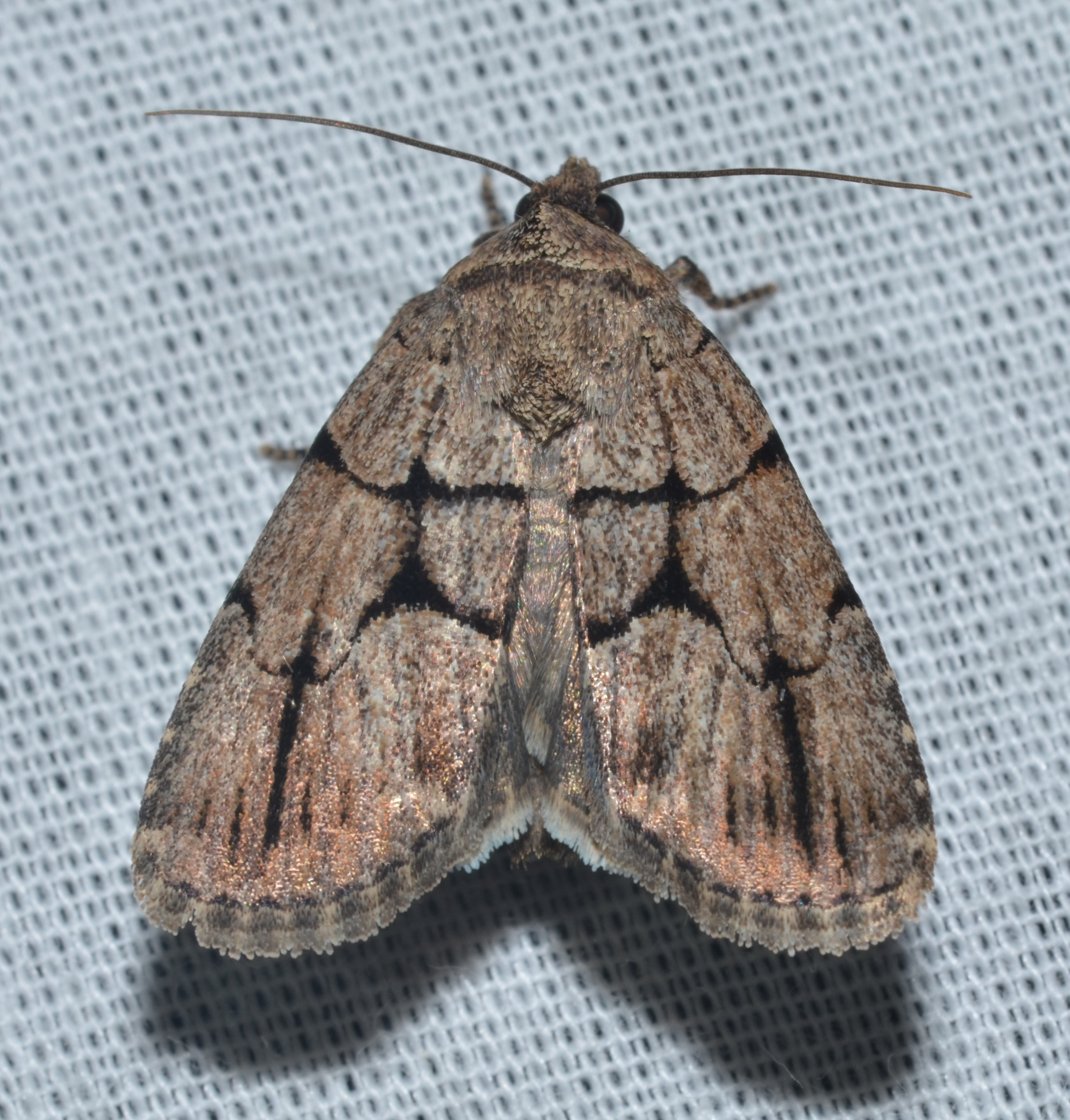

Scientific classification
- Domain: Eukaryota
- Kingdom: Animalia
- Phylum: Arthropoda
- Class: Insecta
- Order: Lepidoptera
- Superfamily: Noctuoidea
- Family: Noctuidae
- Genus: Sympistis
- Species: S. kappa

Binomial name
- Sympistis kappa (Grote, 1874)

Synonyms
- Sympistis retroversa (Morrison, 1875)

= Sympistis kappa =

Species of moth

Sympistis kappa is a species of moth in the family Noctuidae (the owlet moths). It is found in North America.

The MONA or Hodges number for Sympistis kappa is 10066.2.

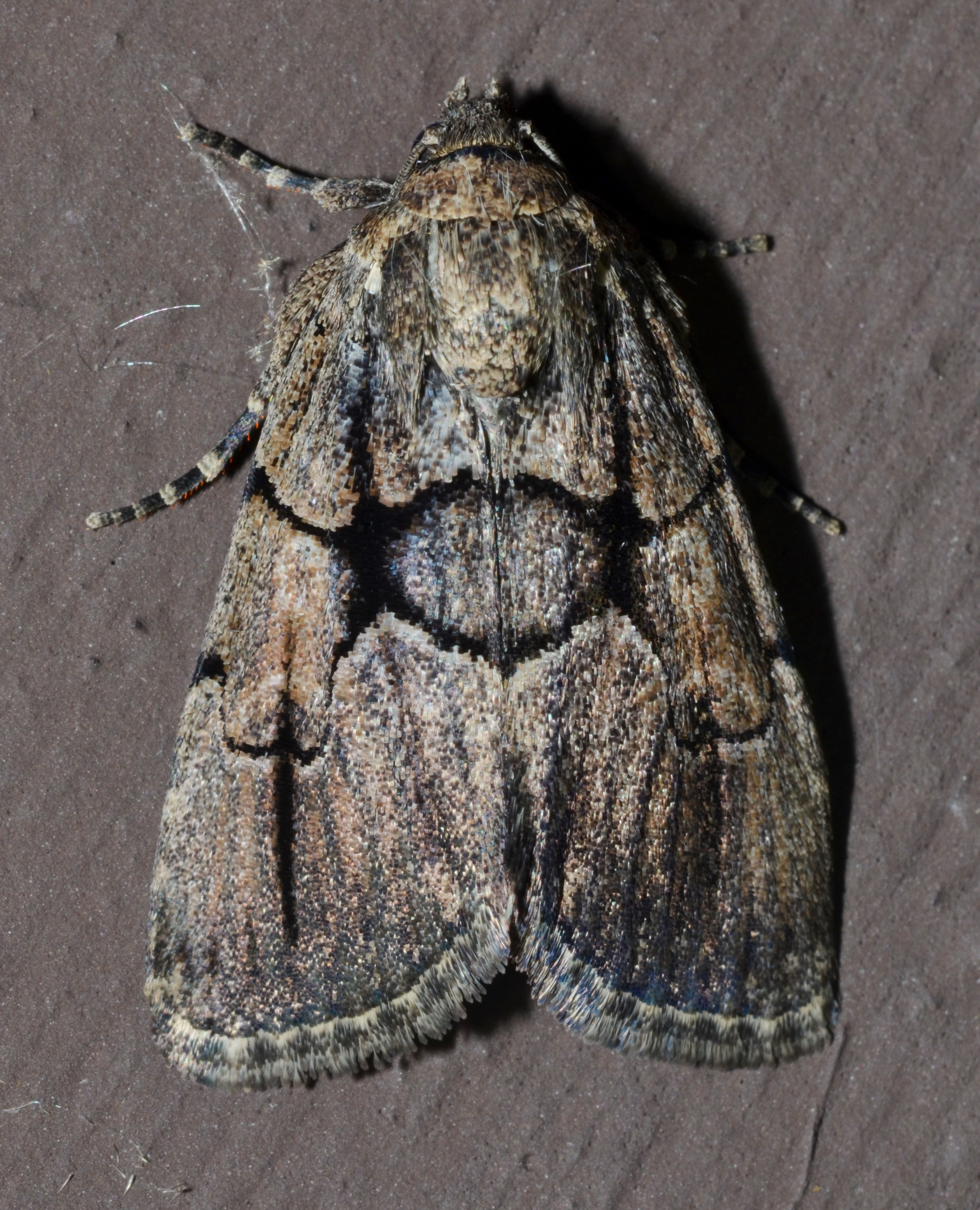
