= Sympistis opleri =

Scientific classification
- Domain: Eukaryota
- Kingdom: Animalia
- Phylum: Arthropoda
- Class: Insecta
- Order: Lepidoptera
- Superfamily: Noctuoidea
- Family: Noctuidae
- Genus: Sympistis
- Species: S. opleri

Binomial name
- Sympistis opleri Troubridge, 2008

Species of moth

Sympistis opleri is a moth of the family Noctuidae first described by James T. Troubridge in 2008. It is found in the US state of Wyoming.

The wingspan is about 27 mm.
