= Sympistis chandleri =

Scientific classification
- Kingdom: Animalia
- Phylum: Arthropoda
- Class: Insecta
- Order: Lepidoptera
- Superfamily: Noctuoidea
- Family: Noctuidae
- Genus: Sympistis
- Species: S. chandleri

Binomial name
- Sympistis chandleri (Grote, 1873)

Synonyms
- Sympistis colorado (Smith, 1893)

Species of moth

Sympistis chandleri is a species of moth in the family Noctuidae (the owlet moths).

The MONA or Hodges number for Sympistis chandleri is 10140.
