= Sympistis bes =

Scientific classification
- Domain: Eukaryota
- Kingdom: Animalia
- Phylum: Arthropoda
- Class: Insecta
- Order: Lepidoptera
- Superfamily: Noctuoidea
- Family: Noctuidae
- Genus: Sympistis
- Species: S. bes

Binomial name
- Sympistis bes Troubridge, 2008

Species of moth

Sympistis bes is a moth of the family Noctuidae first described by James T. Troubridge in 2008. It is found in southern Texas in the US.

The wingspan is 30–38 mm. Adults are on wing from late March to April and early September.
