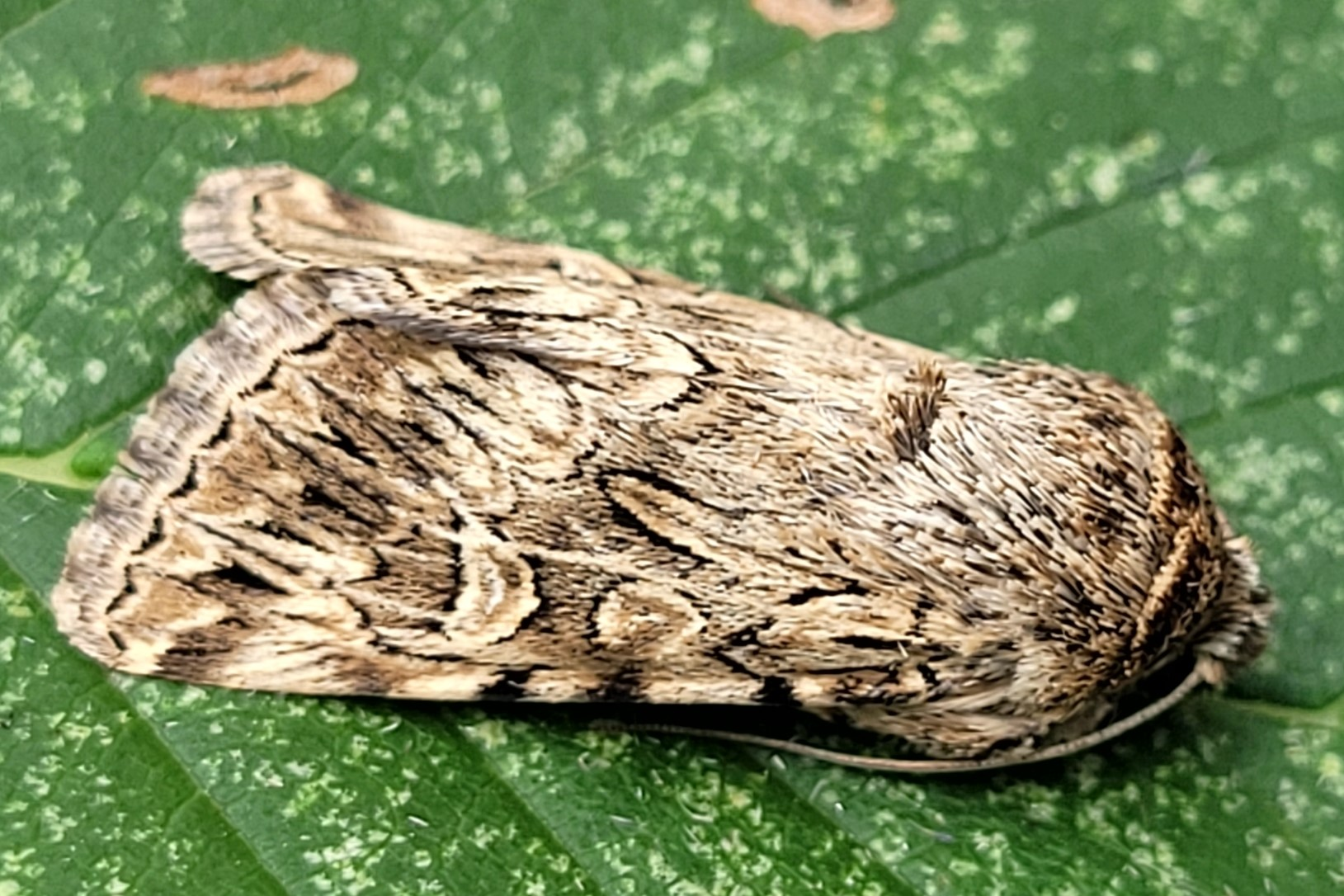

Scientific classification
- Domain: Eukaryota
- Kingdom: Animalia
- Phylum: Arthropoda
- Class: Insecta
- Order: Lepidoptera
- Superfamily: Noctuoidea
- Family: Noctuidae
- Genus: Sympistis
- Species: S. insanina

Binomial name
- Sympistis insanina Troubridge, 2008

= Sympistis insanina =

Species of moth

Sympistis insanina is a moth of the family Noctuidae first described by James T. Troubridge in 2008. It is found in Canada from Alberta and southern Saskatchewan.

The wingspan is 33–35 mm.
