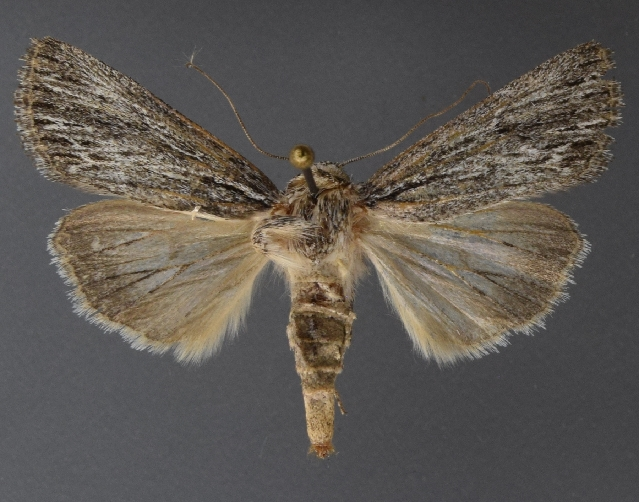

Scientific classification
- Kingdom: Animalia
- Phylum: Arthropoda
- Class: Insecta
- Order: Lepidoptera
- Superfamily: Noctuoidea
- Family: Noctuidae
- Genus: Sympistis
- Species: S. aqualis

Binomial name
- Sympistis aqualis Grote, 1881

Synonyms
- Oncocnemis riparia aqualis; Sympistis sala (Mustelin, 2006)

= Sympistis aqualis =

Species of moth

Sympistis aqualis is a moth of the family Noctuidae first described by Augustus Radcliffe Grote in 1881. It is found in North America. It was formerly considered a subspecies of Oncocnemis riparia, but was elevated to species status and transferred to the genus Sympistis in 2008.

The wingspan is about 36 mm.
