= Sympistis modesta =

Scientific classification
- Domain: Eukaryota
- Kingdom: Animalia
- Phylum: Arthropoda
- Class: Insecta
- Order: Lepidoptera
- Superfamily: Noctuoidea
- Family: Noctuidae
- Genus: Sympistis
- Species: S. modesta

Binomial name
- Sympistis modesta (McDunnough, 1933)

Species of moth

Sympistis modesta is a species of moth in the family Noctuidae (the owlet moths).

The MONA or Hodges number for Sympistis modesta is 10090.
