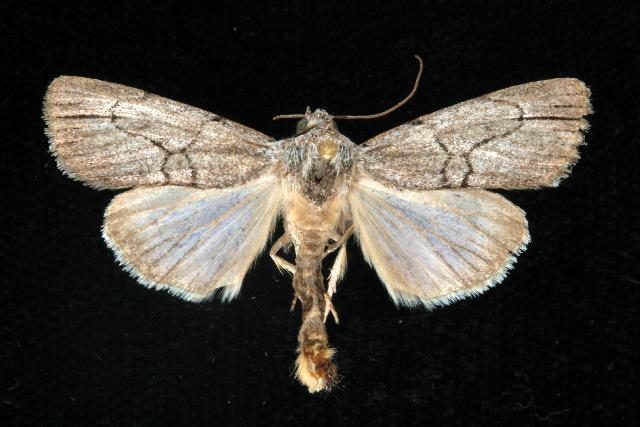

Scientific classification
- Domain: Eukaryota
- Kingdom: Animalia
- Phylum: Arthropoda
- Class: Insecta
- Order: Lepidoptera
- Superfamily: Noctuoidea
- Family: Noctuidae
- Genus: Sympistis
- Species: S. semicollaris

Binomial name
- Sympistis semicollaris Smith, 1909

Synonyms
- Oncocnemis semicollaris

= Sympistis semicollaris =

Species of moth

Sympistis semicollaris is a moth of the family Noctuidae first described by Smith in 1909. It is found in western North America in the vicinity of the Gulf of Georgia and east of the Cascades from south-central British Columbia to central Oregon.

The wingspan is about 31 mm.
