= Sympistis astrigata =

Scientific classification
- Domain: Eukaryota
- Kingdom: Animalia
- Phylum: Arthropoda
- Class: Insecta
- Order: Lepidoptera
- Superfamily: Noctuoidea
- Family: Noctuidae
- Genus: Sympistis
- Species: S. astrigata

Binomial name
- Sympistis astrigata (Barnes & McDunnough, 1912)

Species of moth

Sympistis astrigata is a species of moth in the family Noctuidae (the owlet moths). It was first described by William Barnes and James Halliday McDunnough in 1912 and it is found in North America.

The MONA or Hodges number for Sympistis astrigata is 10134.
