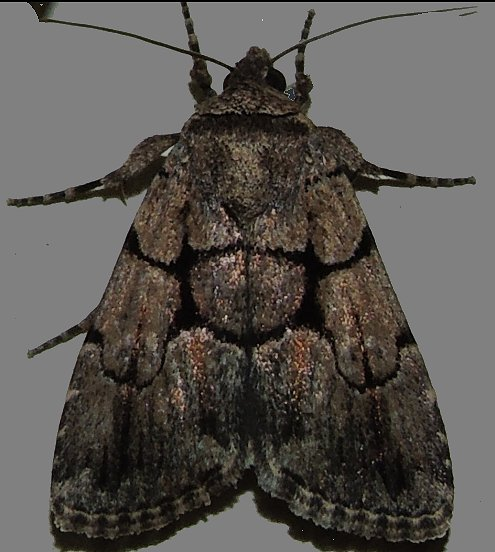

Scientific classification
- Domain: Eukaryota
- Kingdom: Animalia
- Phylum: Arthropoda
- Class: Insecta
- Order: Lepidoptera
- Superfamily: Noctuoidea
- Family: Noctuidae
- Genus: Sympistis
- Species: S. dinalda

Binomial name
- Sympistis dinalda Smith, 1908

Synonyms
- Homohadena infixa dinalda; Homohadena retroversa

= Sympistis dinalda =

Species of moth

Sympistis dinalda is a moth of the family Noctuidae first described by Smith in 1908. It is found in the boreal and subboreal parts of Canada. It was formerly known as Homohadena infixa dinalda, a subspecies of Homohadena infixa but was elevated to species level and transferred to the genus Sympistis in 2008.

The wingspan is 30–35 mm.
