= Sympistis arizonensis =

Scientific classification
- Domain: Eukaryota
- Kingdom: Animalia
- Phylum: Arthropoda
- Class: Insecta
- Order: Lepidoptera
- Superfamily: Noctuoidea
- Family: Noctuidae
- Genus: Sympistis
- Species: S. arizonensis

Binomial name
- Sympistis arizonensis (Barnes, 1928)

Synonyms
- Oncocnemis arizonensis

Species of moth

Sympistis arizonensis is a moth of the family Noctuidae first described by William Barnes in 1928. It is found in the United States in southeastern Arizona as well as northern Colorado. It was formerly known as Oncocnemis arizonensis, but was transferred to the genus Sympistis in 2008.

The wingspan is about 33 mm.
