= Sympistis youngi =

Scientific classification
- Domain: Eukaryota
- Kingdom: Animalia
- Phylum: Arthropoda
- Class: Insecta
- Order: Lepidoptera
- Superfamily: Noctuoidea
- Family: Noctuidae
- Genus: Sympistis
- Species: S. youngi

Binomial name
- Sympistis youngi McDunnough, 1922

Species of moth

Sympistis youngi is a moth of the family Noctuidae. It is found in North America.

The wingspan is about 35 mm.
