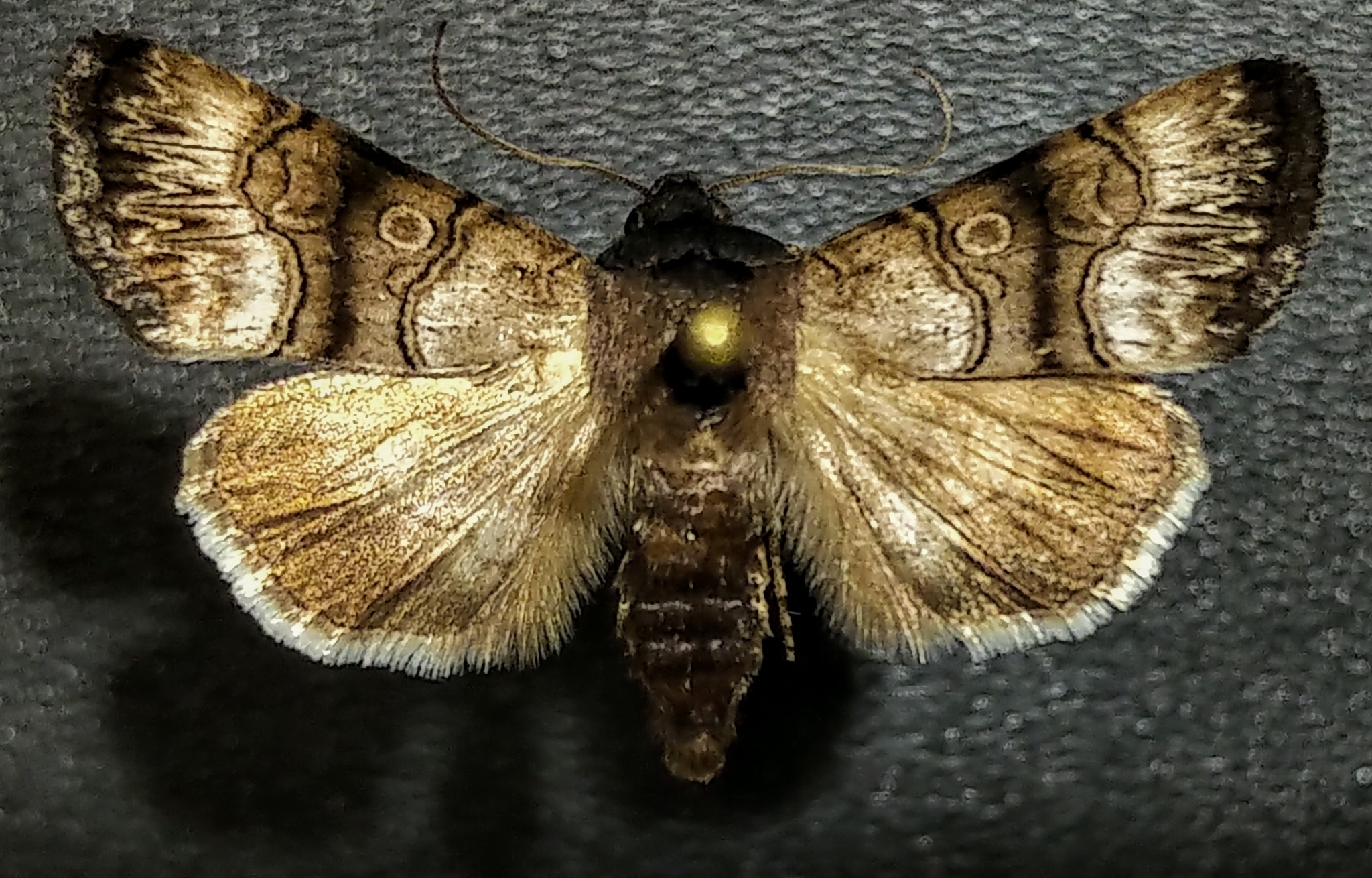

Scientific classification
- Kingdom: Animalia
- Phylum: Arthropoda
- Class: Insecta
- Order: Lepidoptera
- Superfamily: Noctuoidea
- Family: Noctuidae
- Genus: Sympistis
- Species: S. saundersiana

Binomial name
- Sympistis saundersiana (Grote, 1876)

= Sympistis saundersiana =

Species of moth

Sympistis saundersiana, commonly known as Saunders' sympistis or Saunders' sallow moth, is a species of moth in the owlet moth family Noctuidae.
