= Sympistis corusca =

Scientific classification
- Domain: Eukaryota
- Kingdom: Animalia
- Phylum: Arthropoda
- Class: Insecta
- Order: Lepidoptera
- Superfamily: Noctuoidea
- Family: Noctuidae
- Genus: Sympistis
- Species: S. corusca

Binomial name
- Sympistis corusca (Smith, 1899)

Species of moth

Sympistis corusca is a species of moth in the family Noctuidae (the owlet moths).

The MONA or Hodges number for Sympistis corusca is 10074.
