= Sympistis figurata =

Scientific classification
- Domain: Eukaryota
- Kingdom: Animalia
- Phylum: Arthropoda
- Class: Insecta
- Order: Lepidoptera
- Superfamily: Noctuoidea
- Family: Noctuidae
- Genus: Sympistis
- Species: S. figurata

Binomial name
- Sympistis figurata Harvey, 1875

Synonyms
- Oncocnemis figurata

Species of moth

Sympistis figurata is a moth of the family Noctuidae first described by Leon F. Harvey in 1875. It is found in the United States east of the Cascade Range in Washington and Oregon.

The wingspan is 27–31 mm.

== Subspecies ==
The former subspecies Oncocnemis figurata pallidior, has been elevated to species status and transferred to the genus Sympistis as Sympistis pallidior.
