= Sympistis sesmu =

Scientific classification
- Domain: Eukaryota
- Kingdom: Animalia
- Phylum: Arthropoda
- Class: Insecta
- Order: Lepidoptera
- Superfamily: Noctuoidea
- Family: Noctuidae
- Genus: Sympistis
- Species: S. sesmu

Binomial name
- Sympistis sesmu Troubridge, 2008

Species of moth

Sympistis sesmu is a moth of the family Noctuidae first described by James T. Troubridge in 2008. It is found in the United States from eastern Oregon to Washington

The wingspan is 30–36 mm. Adults are on wing from Late August to September.
