= Sympistis anubis =

Scientific classification
- Domain: Eukaryota
- Kingdom: Animalia
- Phylum: Arthropoda
- Class: Insecta
- Order: Lepidoptera
- Superfamily: Noctuoidea
- Family: Noctuidae
- Genus: Sympistis
- Species: S. anubis

Binomial name
- Sympistis anubis Troubridge, 2008

Species of moth

Sympistis anubis is a moth of the family Noctuidae. It is found in California and the northern Sierra Nevada at altitudes of about 5,400 feet (1,600 m).

The wingspan is about 30 mm (1.2 in). Adults are on wing in late August.
