= Sympistis chorda =

Scientific classification
- Kingdom: Animalia
- Phylum: Arthropoda
- Class: Insecta
- Order: Lepidoptera
- Superfamily: Noctuoidea
- Family: Noctuidae
- Genus: Sympistis
- Species: S. chorda

Binomial name
- Sympistis chorda Grote, 1880

Synonyms
- Oncocnemis chorda; Oncocnemis refecta

Species of moth

Sympistis chorda is a moth of the family Noctuidae first described by Augustus Radcliffe Grote in 1880. It is found in North America from British Columbia, south to California. It was formerly known as Oncocnemis chorda, but was transferred to the genus Sympistis in 2008.

The wingspan is about 32 mm.

== Subspecies ==
The following subspecies are recognised:

- Sympistis chorda chorda
- Sympistis chorda extremis
