= Sympistis tenuifascia =

Scientific classification
- Domain: Eukaryota
- Kingdom: Animalia
- Phylum: Arthropoda
- Class: Insecta
- Order: Lepidoptera
- Superfamily: Noctuoidea
- Family: Noctuidae
- Genus: Sympistis
- Species: S. tenuifascia

Binomial name
- Sympistis tenuifascia Smith, 1888

Synonyms
- Sympistis mus (Troubridge & Crabo, 1999)

Species of moth

Sympistis tenuifascia is a moth of the family Noctuidae. It is found in Canada, near the treeline.

The wingspan ranges from 22 to 26 mm.
