= Sympistis horus =

Scientific classification
- Kingdom: Animalia
- Phylum: Arthropoda
- Clade: Pancrustacea
- Class: Insecta
- Order: Lepidoptera
- Superfamily: Noctuoidea
- Family: Noctuidae
- Genus: Sympistis
- Species: S. horus

Binomial name
- Sympistis horus Troubridge, 2008

Species of moth

Sympistis horus is a moth of the family Noctuidae first described by James T. Troubridge in 2008. It is found in New Mexico.

The wingspan is about 32 mm.
