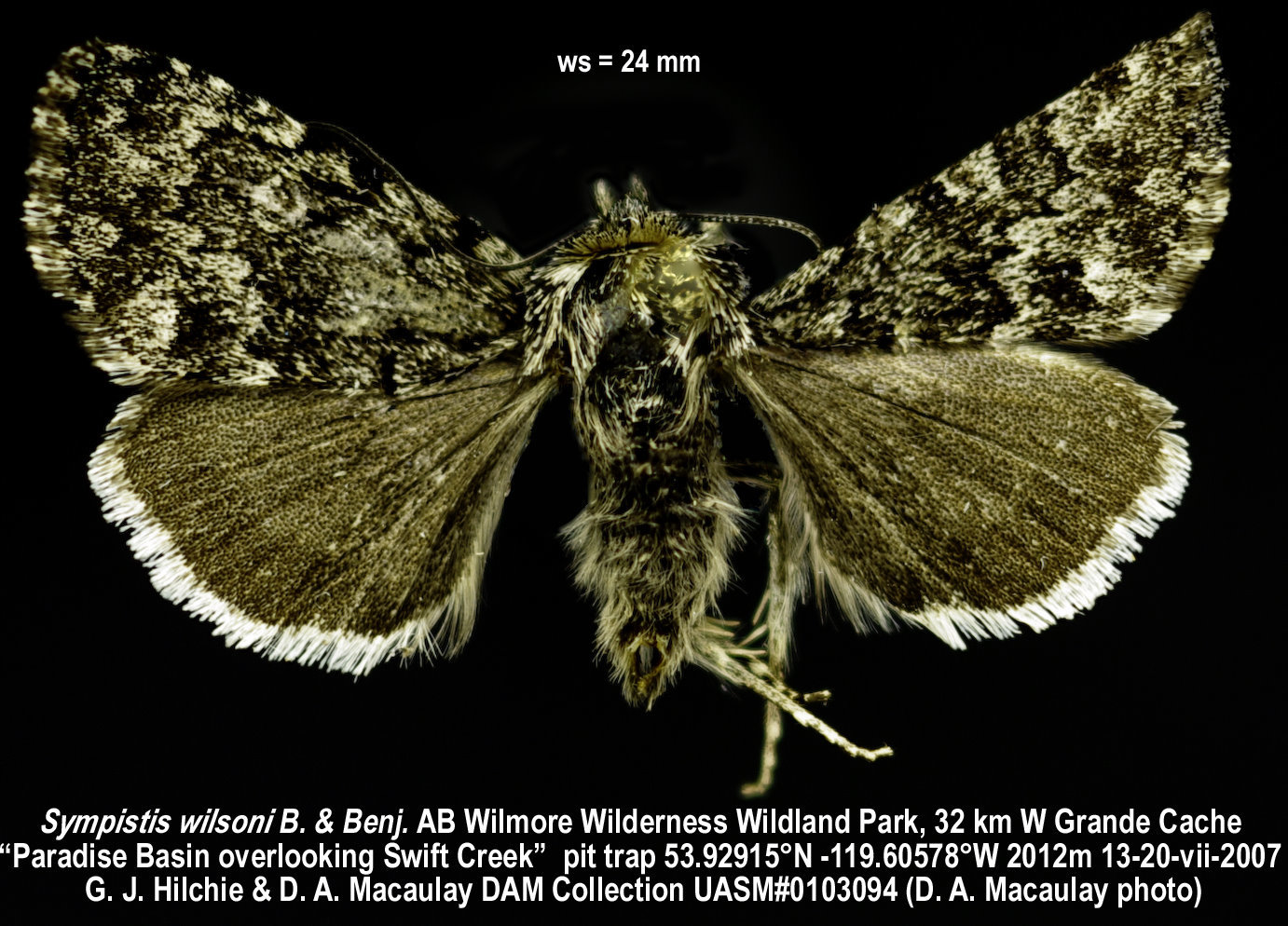

Scientific classification
- Domain: Eukaryota
- Kingdom: Animalia
- Phylum: Arthropoda
- Class: Insecta
- Order: Lepidoptera
- Superfamily: Noctuoidea
- Family: Noctuidae
- Genus: Sympistis
- Species: S. wilsoni

Binomial name
- Sympistis wilsoni Barnes & Benjamin, 1924

= Sympistis wilsoni =

Moth native to Canada

Sympistis wilsoni is a moth of the family Noctuidae first described by William Barnes and Foster Hendrickson Benjamin in 1924. It is found in the Canadian provinces of Alberta and British Columbia.

The wingspan is about 24 mm.
