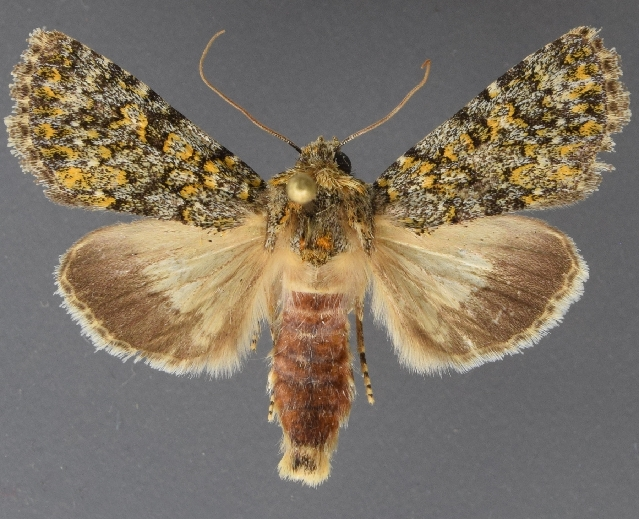

Scientific classification
- Kingdom: Animalia
- Phylum: Arthropoda
- Clade: Pancrustacea
- Class: Insecta
- Order: Lepidoptera
- Superfamily: Noctuoidea
- Family: Noctuidae
- Genus: Sympistis
- Species: S. wilsonensis

Binomial name
- Sympistis wilsonensis (Hill, 1924)

= Sympistis wilsonensis =

Species of moth

Sympistis wilsonensis is a species of moth in the family Noctuidae (the owlet moths).
