= Sympistis collaris =

Scientific classification
- Domain: Eukaryota
- Kingdom: Animalia
- Phylum: Arthropoda
- Class: Insecta
- Order: Lepidoptera
- Superfamily: Noctuoidea
- Family: Noctuidae
- Genus: Sympistis
- Species: S. collaris

Binomial name
- Sympistis collaris Troubridge, 2008

Species of moth

Sympistis collaris is a moth of the family Noctuidae first described by James T. Troubridge in 2008.

The wingspan is about 33 mm.
