= Sympistis occata =

Scientific classification
- Domain: Eukaryota
- Kingdom: Animalia
- Phylum: Arthropoda
- Class: Insecta
- Order: Lepidoptera
- Superfamily: Noctuoidea
- Family: Noctuidae
- Genus: Sympistis
- Species: S. occata

Binomial name
- Sympistis occata (Grote, 1875)

Species of moth

Sympistis occata, the harrow moth, is a species of moth in the family Noctuidae (the owlet moths).

The MONA or Hodges number for Sympistis occata is 10101.
