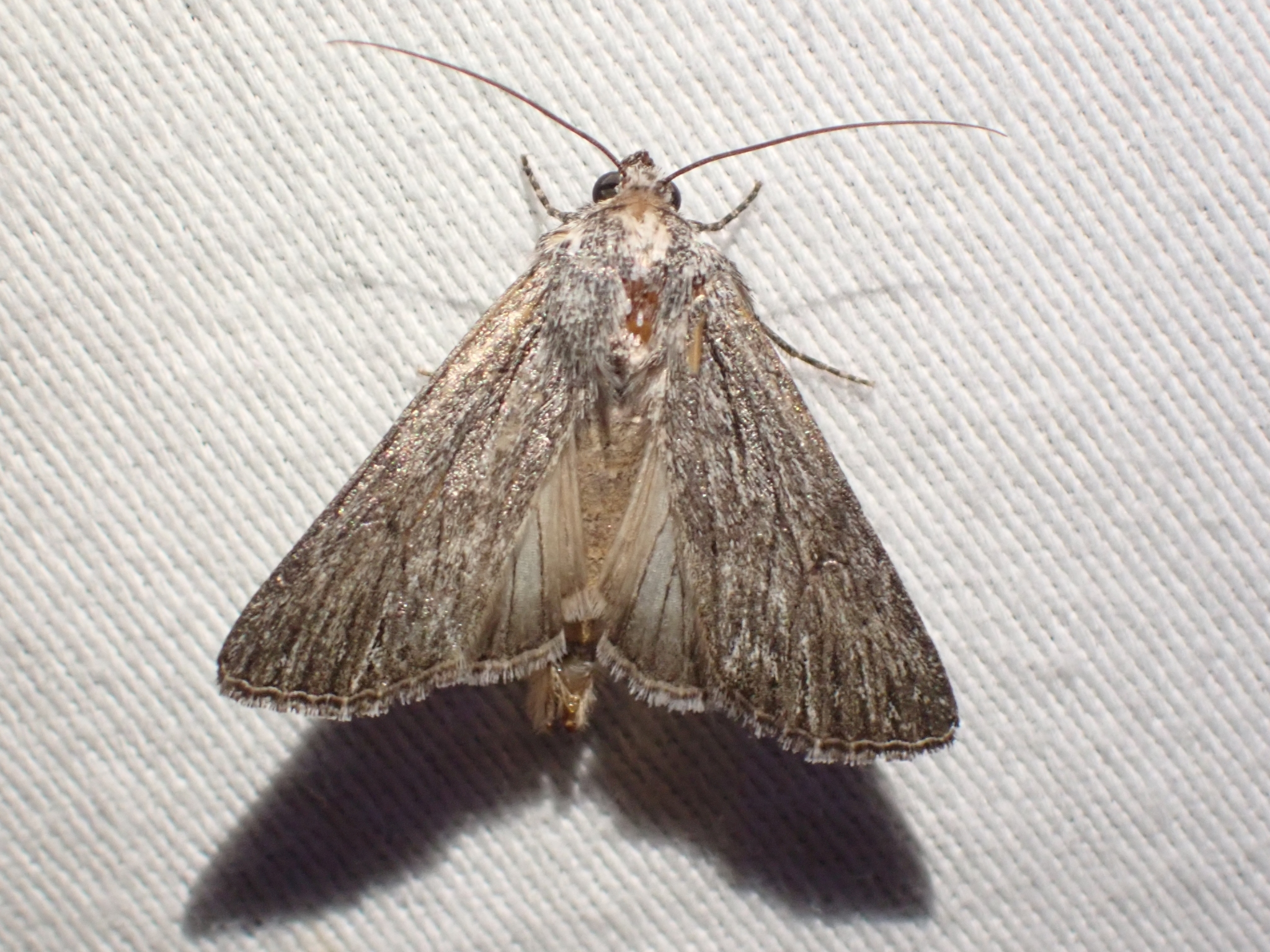

Scientific classification
- Domain: Eukaryota
- Kingdom: Animalia
- Phylum: Arthropoda
- Class: Insecta
- Order: Lepidoptera
- Superfamily: Noctuoidea
- Family: Noctuidae
- Genus: Sympistis
- Species: S. chons

Binomial name
- Sympistis chons Troubridge, 2008

= Sympistis chons =

Species of moth

Sympistis chons is a species of moth in the family Noctuidae that was first described by James T. Troubridge in 2008. It is found in North America from Alberta to British Columbia, south to Arizona.

Its habitat consists of dry places, such as badlands, dry river valleys, ponderosa pine forests and deserts.

The wingspan is 30–36 mm. Adults are on wing from June to August.
