= Sympistis lachrymosa =

Scientific classification
- Domain: Eukaryota
- Kingdom: Animalia
- Phylum: Arthropoda
- Class: Insecta
- Order: Lepidoptera
- Superfamily: Noctuoidea
- Family: Noctuidae
- Genus: Sympistis
- Species: S. lachrymosa

Binomial name
- Sympistis lachrymosa Troubridge, 2008

Species of moth

Sympistis lachrymosa is a moth of the family Noctuidae first described by James T. Troubridge in 2008. It is found in the US from western Texas to New Mexico.

The wingspan is 34–36 mm. Adults are on wing from late September to late October.
