= Sympistis sakhmet =

Scientific classification
- Domain: Eukaryota
- Kingdom: Animalia
- Phylum: Arthropoda
- Class: Insecta
- Order: Lepidoptera
- Superfamily: Noctuoidea
- Family: Noctuidae
- Genus: Sympistis
- Species: S. sakhmet

Binomial name
- Sympistis sakhmet Troubridge, 2008

Species of moth

Sympistis sakhmet is a moth of the family Noctuidae. It is found in New Mexico. The wingspan is about 31 mm.
