= Sympistis cherti =

Scientific classification
- Domain: Eukaryota
- Kingdom: Animalia
- Phylum: Arthropoda
- Class: Insecta
- Order: Lepidoptera
- Superfamily: Noctuoidea
- Family: Noctuidae
- Genus: Sympistis
- Species: S. cherti

Binomial name
- Sympistis cherti Troubridge, 2008

Species of moth

Sympistis cherti is a moth of the family Noctuidae first described by James T. Troubridge in 2008. It is found in western North America from south central British Columbia south to Nevada and California at altitudes of 2,400 to 6,300 feet (730 to 1,920 m).

The wingspan is 30 to 40 mm (1.2 to 1.6 in). Adults are on wing from mid to late July to August.
