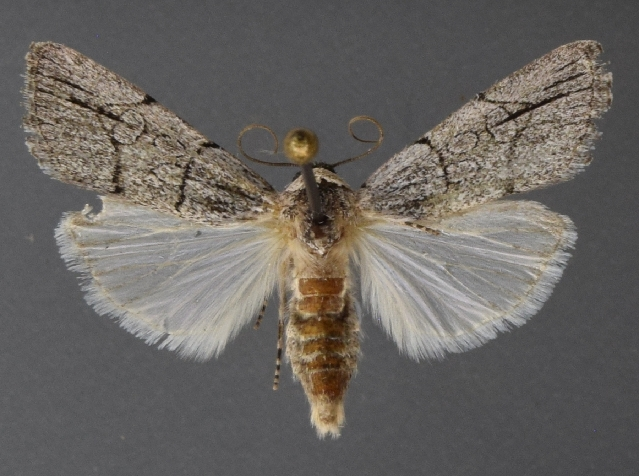

Scientific classification
- Kingdom: Animalia
- Phylum: Arthropoda
- Class: Insecta
- Order: Lepidoptera
- Superfamily: Noctuoidea
- Family: Noctuidae
- Genus: Sympistis
- Species: S. griseicollis

Binomial name
- Sympistis griseicollis (Grote, 1882)

= Sympistis griseicollis =

Species of moth

Sympistis griseicollis is a species of moth in the family Noctuidae (the owlet moths).

The MONA or Hodges number for Sympistis griseicollis is 10148.
