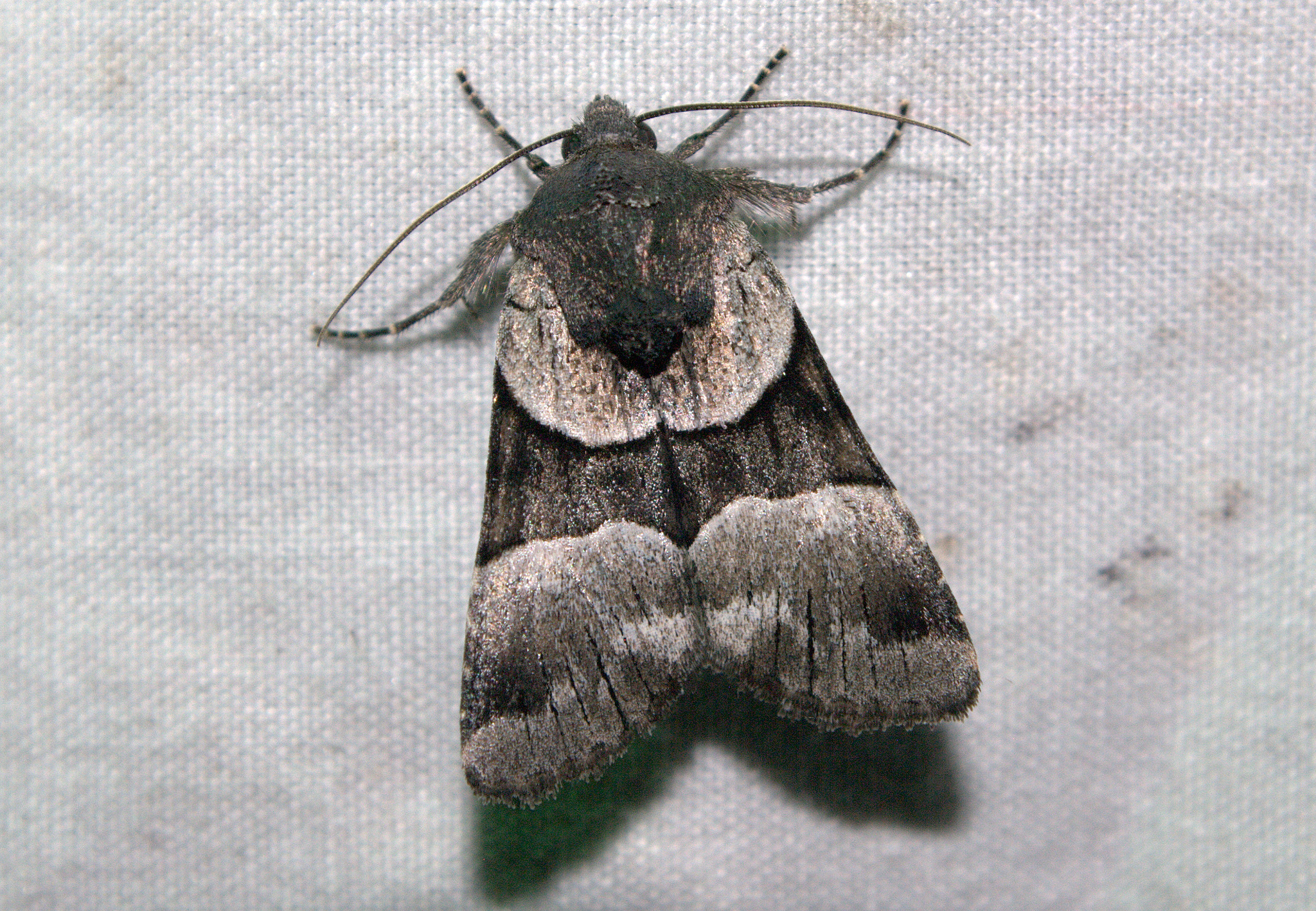

Scientific classification
- Kingdom: Animalia
- Phylum: Arthropoda
- Class: Insecta
- Order: Lepidoptera
- Superfamily: Noctuoidea
- Family: Noctuidae
- Genus: Sympistis
- Species: S. piffardi

Binomial name
- Sympistis piffardi (Walker, 1862)

= Sympistis piffardi =

Species of moth

Sympistis piffardi, the three-striped oncocnemis, is a species of moth in the owlet moth family Noctuidae. It is found in North America.
