= Sympistis columbia =

Scientific classification
- Domain: Eukaryota
- Kingdom: Animalia
- Phylum: Arthropoda
- Class: Insecta
- Order: Lepidoptera
- Superfamily: Noctuoidea
- Family: Noctuidae
- Genus: Sympistis
- Species: S. columbia

Binomial name
- Sympistis columbia McDunnough, 1922

Synonyms
- Oncocnemis columbia

Species of moth

Sympistis columbia is a moth of the family Noctuidae first described by James Halliday McDunnough in 1922. It is found in Canada's British Columbia and possibly further south into the United States. It was formerly known as Oncocnemis columbia, but was transferred to the genus Sympistis in 2008.

The wingspan is about 35 mm.

The larvae feed on Holodiscus discolor.
