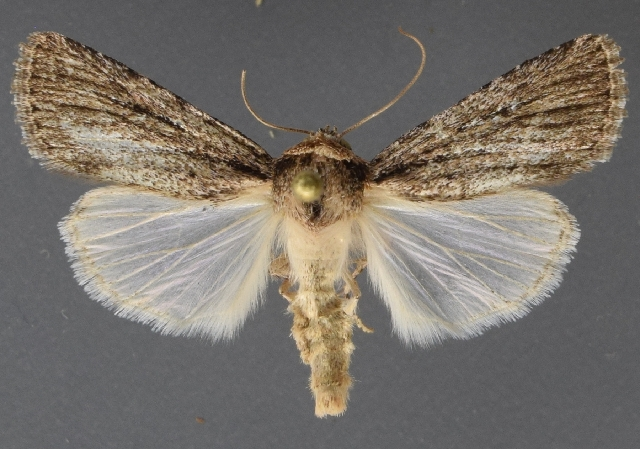

Scientific classification
- Domain: Eukaryota
- Kingdom: Animalia
- Phylum: Arthropoda
- Class: Insecta
- Order: Lepidoptera
- Superfamily: Noctuoidea
- Family: Noctuidae
- Genus: Sympistis
- Species: S. khepri

Binomial name
- Sympistis khepri Troubridge, 2008

= Sympistis khepri =

Species of moth

Sympistis khepri is a moth of the family Noctuidae first described by James T. Troubridge in 2008. It is found in Arizona.
