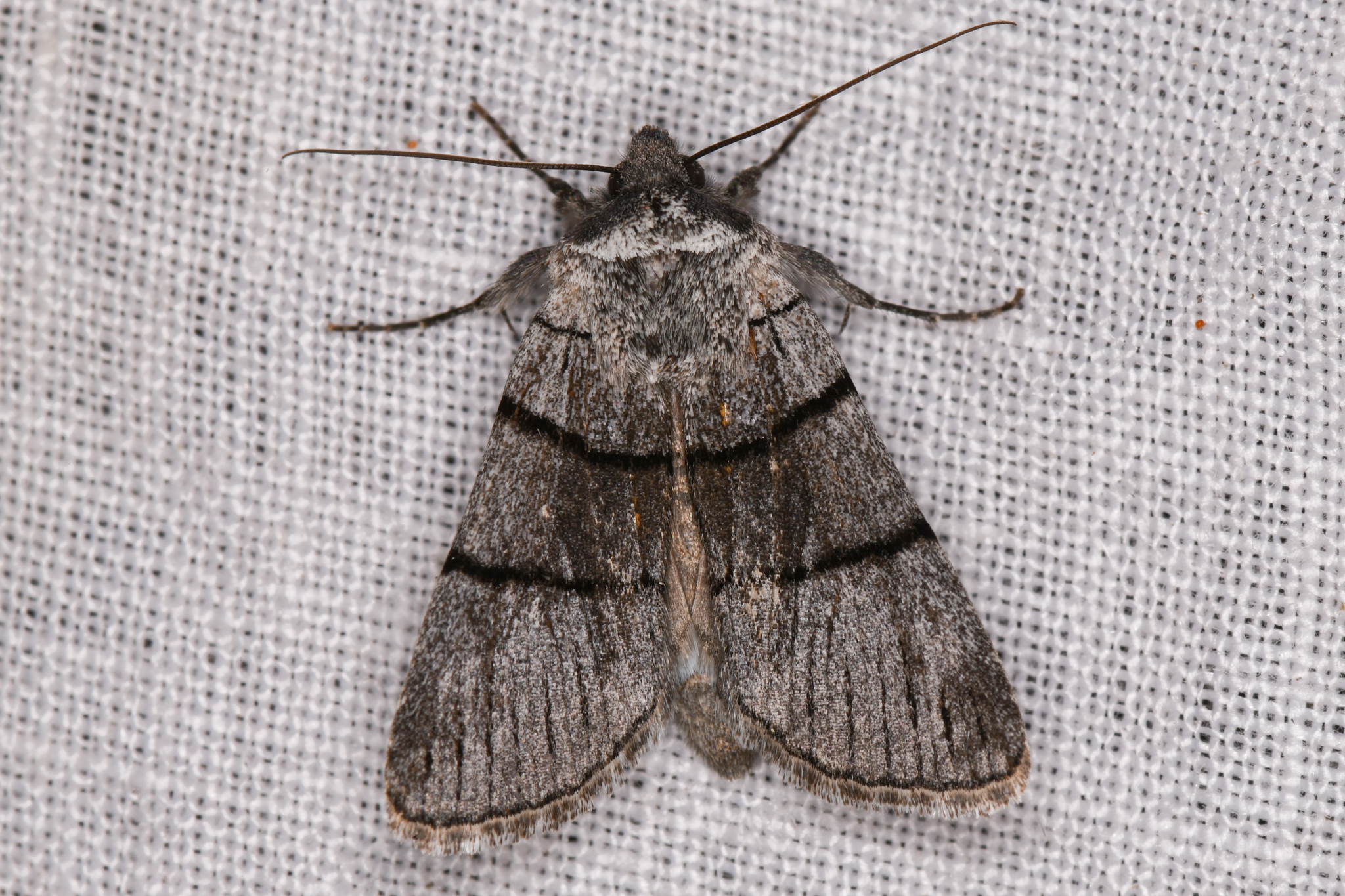

Scientific classification
- Domain: Eukaryota
- Kingdom: Animalia
- Phylum: Arthropoda
- Class: Insecta
- Order: Lepidoptera
- Superfamily: Noctuoidea
- Family: Noctuidae
- Genus: Sympistis
- Species: S. barnesii

Binomial name
- Sympistis barnesii (Smith, 1899)

= Sympistis barnesii =

Species of moth

Sympistis barnesii is a species of moth in the owlet moth family Noctuidae.
