= Sympistis jocelynae =

Scientific classification
- Domain: Eukaryota
- Kingdom: Animalia
- Phylum: Arthropoda
- Class: Insecta
- Order: Lepidoptera
- Superfamily: Noctuoidea
- Family: Noctuidae
- Genus: Sympistis
- Species: S. jocelynae

Binomial name
- Sympistis jocelynae Troubridge, 2008

Species of Moth

Sympistis jocelynae is a moth of the family Noctuidae first described by James T. Troubridge in 2008. It is found in San Juan County, Utah, in the United States.

The wingspan is 32–35 mm. Adults are on wing in late September.
