= Sympistis umbrifascia =

Scientific classification
- Domain: Eukaryota
- Kingdom: Animalia
- Phylum: Arthropoda
- Class: Insecta
- Order: Lepidoptera
- Superfamily: Noctuoidea
- Family: Noctuidae
- Genus: Sympistis
- Species: S. umbrifascia

Binomial name
- Sympistis umbrifascia (Smith, 1894)

Species of moth

Sympistis umbrifascia is a species of moth in the family Noctuidae (the owlet moths).

The MONA or Hodges number for Sympistis umbrifascia is 10122.
