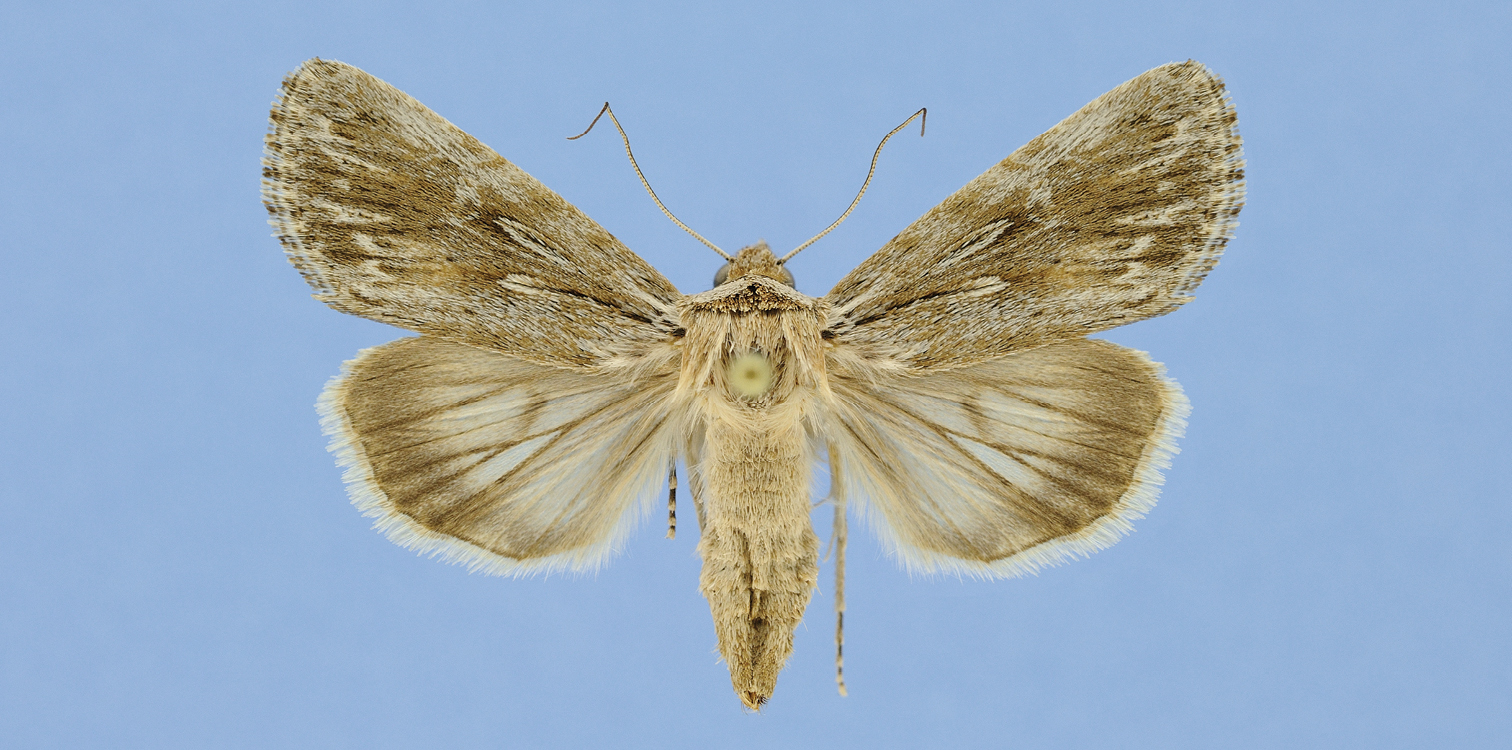
- Sympistis riparia Morrison, Dartmouth, MA, ex larva.

Scientific classification
- Domain: Eukaryota
- Kingdom: Animalia
- Phylum: Arthropoda
- Class: Insecta
- Order: Lepidoptera
- Superfamily: Noctuoidea
- Family: Noctuidae
- Genus: Sympistis
- Species: S. riparia

Binomial name
- Sympistis riparia Morrison, 1875

= Sympistis riparia =

Species of moth

Sympistis riparia, the dune sympistis, is a moth of the family Noctuidae. The species was first described by Herbert Knowles Morrison in 1875. It is native to North America and it is listed as a species of special concern in Massachusetts and in Connecticut.
