= Sympistis aterrima =

Scientific classification
- Kingdom: Animalia
- Phylum: Arthropoda
- Class: Insecta
- Order: Lepidoptera
- Superfamily: Noctuoidea
- Family: Noctuidae
- Genus: Sympistis
- Species: S. aterrima

Binomial name
- Sympistis aterrima Grote, 1879

Synonyms
- Stylopoda aterrima

Species of moth

Sympistis aterrima is a moth of the family Noctuidae first described by Augustus Radcliffe Grote in 1879. It is found in North America, including California.

The wingspan is about 25 mm.
