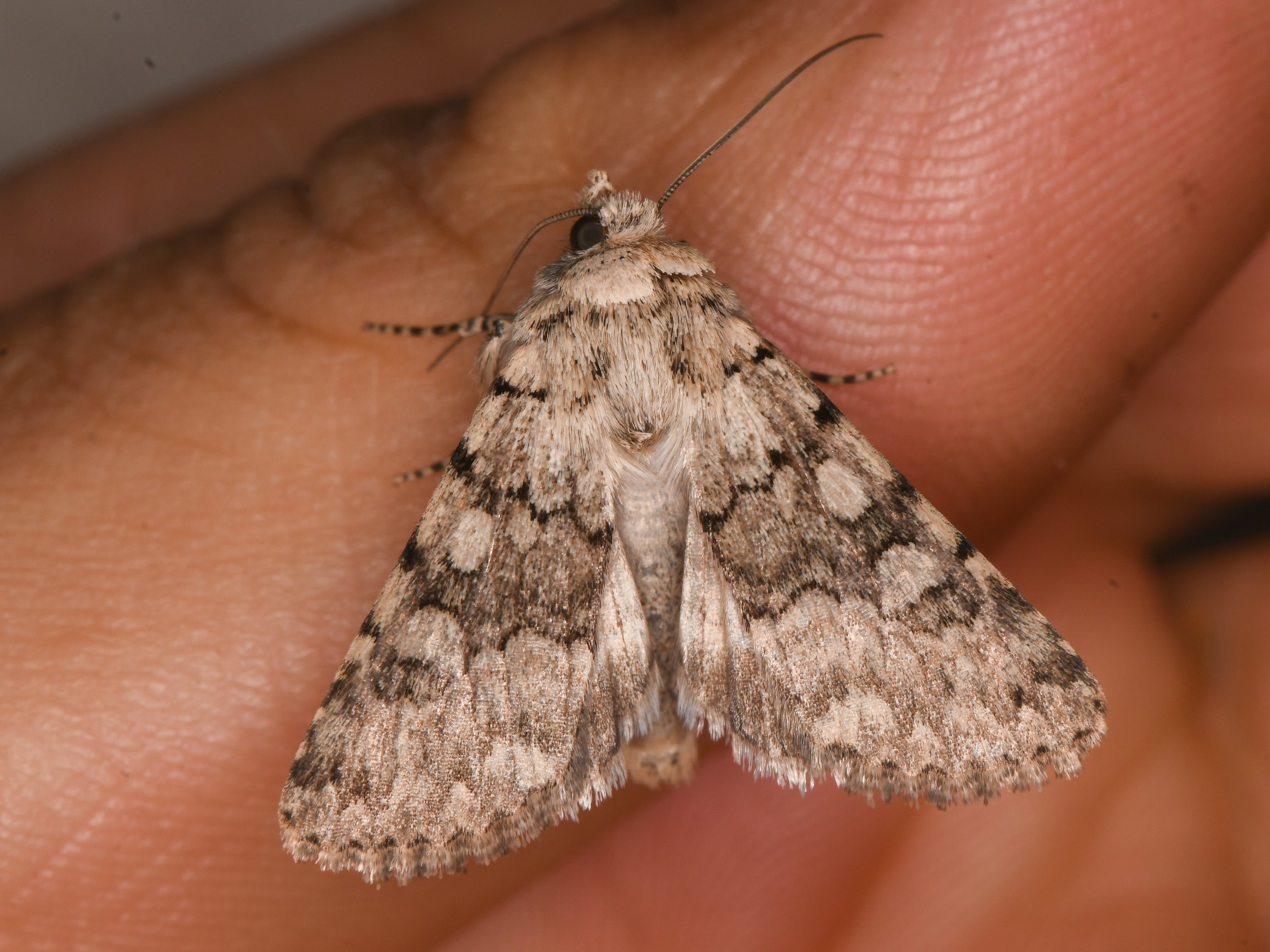

Scientific classification
- Domain: Eukaryota
- Kingdom: Animalia
- Phylum: Arthropoda
- Class: Insecta
- Order: Lepidoptera
- Superfamily: Noctuoidea
- Family: Noctuidae
- Genus: Sympistis
- Species: S. acheron

Binomial name
- Sympistis acheron Troubridge, 2008

= Sympistis acheron =

Species of moth

Sympistis acheron is a species of moth in the family Noctuidae that was first described by James T. Troubridge in 2008. It is found from in western North America from southern British Columbia south to California at altitudes of 2,000 to 10,000 feet (600 to 3,000 m).

The wingspan is 32 to 39 mm (1.3 to 1.5 in). Adults are on wing from late July to late September.
