= Sympistis franclemonti =

Scientific classification
- Domain: Eukaryota
- Kingdom: Animalia
- Phylum: Arthropoda
- Class: Insecta
- Order: Lepidoptera
- Superfamily: Noctuoidea
- Family: Noctuidae
- Genus: Sympistis
- Species: S. franclemonti

Binomial name
- Sympistis franclemonti (A. Blanchard, 1968)

Synonyms
- Oxycnemis franclemonti A. Blanchard, 1968

Species of moth

Sympistis franclemonti is a species of moth in the family Noctuidae (the owlet moths). The MONA or Hodges number for Sympistis franclemonti is 10042. It is known from Texas.

The wingspan is 30–34 mm (1.2–1.3 in).
