= Sympistis apep =

Scientific classification
- Kingdom: Animalia
- Phylum: Arthropoda
- Clade: Pancrustacea
- Class: Insecta
- Order: Lepidoptera
- Superfamily: Noctuoidea
- Family: Noctuidae
- Genus: Sympistis
- Species: S. apep

Binomial name
- Sympistis apep Troubridge, 2008

Species of moth

Sympistis apep is a moth of the family Noctuidae first described by James T. Troubridge in 2008. It is found in western North America from Washington to Oregon at low elevations (up to 2600 feet).

Its habitat consists of thin, dry and rocky soil such as juniper woodlands and sagebrush steppe.

The wingspan is 18–25 mm. Adults are on wing in late September.
