= Sympistis seth =

Scientific classification
- Domain: Eukaryota
- Kingdom: Animalia
- Phylum: Arthropoda
- Class: Insecta
- Order: Lepidoptera
- Superfamily: Noctuoidea
- Family: Noctuidae
- Genus: Sympistis
- Species: S. seth

Binomial name
- Sympistis seth Troubridge, 2008

Species of moth

Sympistis seth is a brown medium-sized moth of the family Noctuidae. The species was first described by James T. Troubridge in 2008. It is found in Oregon. They have an asymmetrically oval orbicular spot, a black-banded cream hindwing, and white fringes on both wings.

The wingspan is about 30 mm.
