= Sympistis nenun =

Scientific classification
- Domain: Eukaryota
- Kingdom: Animalia
- Phylum: Arthropoda
- Class: Insecta
- Order: Lepidoptera
- Superfamily: Noctuoidea
- Family: Noctuidae
- Genus: Sympistis
- Species: S. nenun

Binomial name
- Sympistis nenun Troubridge, 2008

Synonyms
- Sympistis nenum

Species of moth

Sympistis nemum is a moth of the family Noctuidae first described by James T. Troubridge in 2008. It is found in the US state of Utah.

The wingspan is 32 millimetres (1.3 in).
