= Sympistis buchis =

Scientific classification
- Domain: Eukaryota
- Kingdom: Animalia
- Phylum: Arthropoda
- Class: Insecta
- Order: Lepidoptera
- Superfamily: Noctuoidea
- Family: Noctuidae
- Genus: Sympistis
- Species: S. buchis

Binomial name
- Sympistis buchis Troubridge, 2008

Species of moth

Sympistis buchis is a moth of the family Noctuidae first described by James T. Troubridge in 2008. It is found in the United States from western Colorado to southern Utah and south to northwestern Arizona at altitudes of about 6,000 feet.

Its habitat consists of sandy soils.

It was formerly placed in the genus Oncocnemis.

The wingspan is 24–28 mm. Adults are on wing from late July to August and September.
