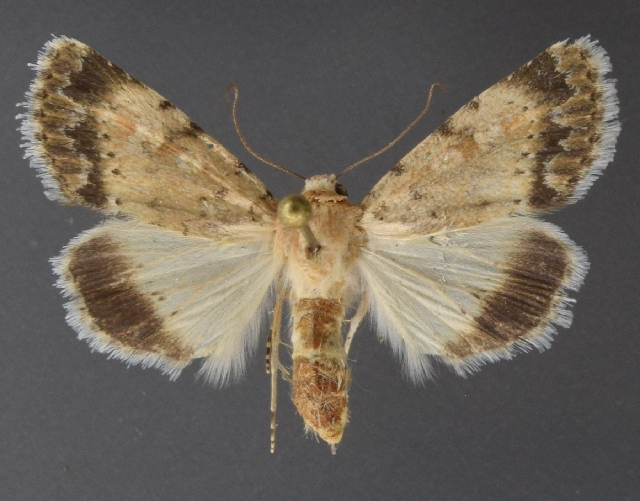

Scientific classification
- Domain: Eukaryota
- Kingdom: Animalia
- Phylum: Arthropoda
- Class: Insecta
- Order: Lepidoptera
- Superfamily: Noctuoidea
- Family: Noctuidae
- Genus: Sympistis
- Species: S. benjamini

Binomial name
- Sympistis benjamini (Lindsey, 1923)

= Sympistis benjamini =

Species of moth

Sympistis benjamini is a species of moth in the family Noctuidae (the owlet moths).

The MONA or Hodges number for Sympistis benjamini is 10087.
