= Sympistis rosea =

Scientific classification
- Domain: Eukaryota
- Kingdom: Animalia
- Phylum: Arthropoda
- Class: Insecta
- Order: Lepidoptera
- Superfamily: Noctuoidea
- Family: Noctuidae
- Genus: Sympistis
- Species: S. rosea

Binomial name
- Sympistis rosea (Smith, 1903)

Species of moth

Sympistis rosea is a species of moth in the family Noctuidae (the owlet moths).

The MONA or Hodges number for Sympistis rosea is 10114.
