= Sympistis sectiloides =

Scientific classification
- Domain: Eukaryota
- Kingdom: Animalia
- Phylum: Arthropoda
- Class: Insecta
- Order: Lepidoptera
- Superfamily: Noctuoidea
- Family: Noctuidae
- Genus: Sympistis
- Species: S. sectiloides

Binomial name
- Sympistis sectiloides (Barnes & McDunnough, 1913)

Species of moth

Sympistis sectiloides is a species of moth in the family Noctuidae (the owlet moths). It was first described by William Barnes and James Halliday McDunnough in 1913 and it is found in North America.

The MONA or Hodges number for Sympistis sectiloides is 10150.
