= Sympistis toddi =

Scientific classification
- Domain: Eukaryota
- Kingdom: Animalia
- Phylum: Arthropoda
- Class: Insecta
- Order: Lepidoptera
- Superfamily: Noctuoidea
- Family: Noctuidae
- Genus: Sympistis
- Species: S. toddi

Binomial name
- Sympistis toddi (A. Blanchard, 1968)

Synonyms
- Oncocnemis toddi A. Blanchard, 1968

Species of moth

Sympistis toddi is a species of moth in the family Noctuidae (the owlet moths). The MONA or Hodges number for Sympistis toddi is 10153. It occurs in Texas and New Mexico.

The wingspan is 21–22 mm (0.8–0.9 in).
