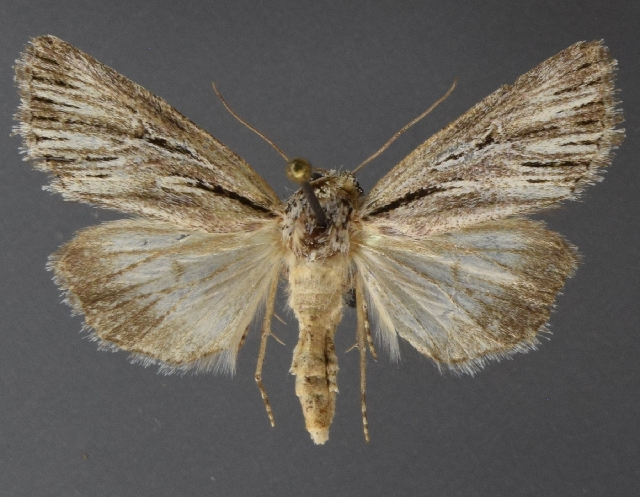

Scientific classification
- Domain: Eukaryota
- Kingdom: Animalia
- Phylum: Arthropoda
- Class: Insecta
- Order: Lepidoptera
- Superfamily: Noctuoidea
- Family: Noctuidae
- Genus: Sympistis
- Species: S. utahensis

Binomial name
- Sympistis utahensis (Barnes & Benjamin, 1924)

= Sympistis utahensis =

Species of moth

Sympistis utahensis is a species of moth in the family Noctuidae (the owlets). It was first described by William Barnes and Foster Hendrickson Benjamin in 1924 and it is found in North America.

The MONA or Hodges number for Sympistis utahensis is 10146.
