= Sympistis cocytus =

Scientific classification
- Domain: Eukaryota
- Kingdom: Animalia
- Phylum: Arthropoda
- Class: Insecta
- Order: Lepidoptera
- Superfamily: Noctuoidea
- Family: Noctuidae
- Genus: Sympistis
- Species: S. cocytus

Binomial name
- Sympistis cocytus Troubridge, 2008

Species of moth

Sympistis cocytus is a moth of the family Noctuidae first described by James T. Troubridge in 2008. It is found in North America from south central British Columbia south to eastern Oregon at elevations from the tree line to the ponderosa pine zone of 2,000 to 6,300 feet (610 to 1,920 m).

The wingspan is 32 to 39 mm (1.3 to 1.5 in). Adults are on wing from mid-August to late September.
