= Sympistis amenthes =

Scientific classification
- Domain: Eukaryota
- Kingdom: Animalia
- Phylum: Arthropoda
- Class: Insecta
- Order: Lepidoptera
- Superfamily: Noctuoidea
- Family: Noctuidae
- Genus: Sympistis
- Species: S. amenthes

Binomial name
- Sympistis amenthes Troubridge, 2008

Species of moth

Sympistis amenthes is a moth of the family Noctuidae first described by James T. Troubridge in 2008. It is found in western North America from Washington to Oregon and from the east slope of the Cascade Range to northwestern Nevada at altitudes of 2,600 to 5,600 feet (800 to 1,700 m).

The wingspan is 28 to 36 mm (1.1 to 1.4 in). Adults are on wing in September.
