= Sympistis babi =

Scientific classification
- Domain: Eukaryota
- Kingdom: Animalia
- Phylum: Arthropoda
- Class: Insecta
- Order: Lepidoptera
- Superfamily: Noctuoidea
- Family: Noctuidae
- Genus: Sympistis
- Species: S. babi

Binomial name
- Sympistis babi Troubridge, 2008

Species of moth

Sympistis babi is a moth of the family Noctuidae first described by James T. Troubridge in 2008. It is found in the US from northwestern Colorado to southeastern Utah at altitudes of 4,700 to 5,200 feet (1,400 to 1,600 m).

The wingspan is 25 to 29 millimetres (1.0 to 1.1 inches). Adults are on wing from June to early July.
