= Sympistis kelsoensis =

Scientific classification
- Domain: Eukaryota
- Kingdom: Animalia
- Phylum: Arthropoda
- Class: Insecta
- Order: Lepidoptera
- Superfamily: Noctuoidea
- Family: Noctuidae
- Genus: Sympistis
- Species: S. kelsoensis

Binomial name
- Sympistis kelsoensis (Robertson & Mustelin, 2006)

Species of moth

Sympistis kelsoensis is a species of moth in the family Noctuidae (the owlet moths). It is found in North America.

The MONA or Hodges number for Sympistis kelsoensis is 10063.1.
