= Sympistis dentata =

Scientific classification
- Kingdom: Animalia
- Phylum: Arthropoda
- Class: Insecta
- Order: Lepidoptera
- Superfamily: Noctuoidea
- Family: Noctuidae
- Genus: Sympistis
- Species: S. dentata

Binomial name
- Sympistis dentata (Grote, 1875)

Synonyms
- Apatela dentata Grote, 1875; Acronycta pyralis Smith, 1895; Sympistis purpurea; Apharetra dentata; Apharetra purpurea McDunnough, 1940; Apharetra pyralis

Species of moth

Sympistis dentata, the toothed apharetra moth, is a moth of the family Noctuidae described by Augustus Radcliffe Grote in 1875. It is found from Yukon, the Northwest Territories, and British Columbia to Newfoundland and the northern United States, south in the east to New Jersey. It is listed as threatened in the US state of Connecticut.

== Host plants ==
Larvae feed on Vaccinium and Kalmia polifolia.
