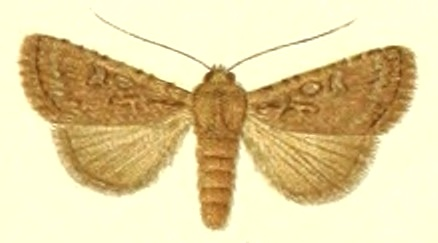
- Euxoa exacta

Scientific classification
- Domain: Eukaryota
- Kingdom: Animalia
- Phylum: Arthropoda
- Class: Insecta
- Order: Lepidoptera
- Superfamily: Noctuoidea
- Family: Noctuidae
- Genus: Sympistis
- Species: S. exacta

Binomial name
- Sympistis exacta Christoph, 1887

Synonyms
- Oncocnemis exacta

= Sympistis exacta =

Species of moth

Sympistis exacta is a moth of the family Noctuidae first described by Hugo Theodor Christoph in 1887. It is found from the Near East to central Asia and Mongolia.

Adults are on wing from June to August. There is one generation per year.
