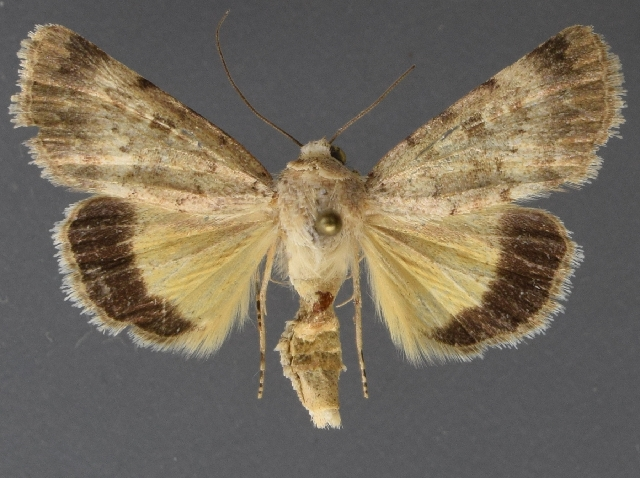

Scientific classification
- Domain: Eukaryota
- Kingdom: Animalia
- Phylum: Arthropoda
- Class: Insecta
- Order: Lepidoptera
- Superfamily: Noctuoidea
- Family: Noctuidae
- Genus: Sympistis
- Species: S. sandaraca

Binomial name
- Sympistis sandaraca Buckett & Bauer, 1967

Synonyms
- Oncocnemis sandaraca

= Sympistis sandaraca =

Species of moth

Sympistis sandaraca is a moth of the family Noctuidae first described by John S. Buckett and William R. Bauer in 1967.

The wingspan is 32–34 mm. Adults are on wing in late summer and fall.
