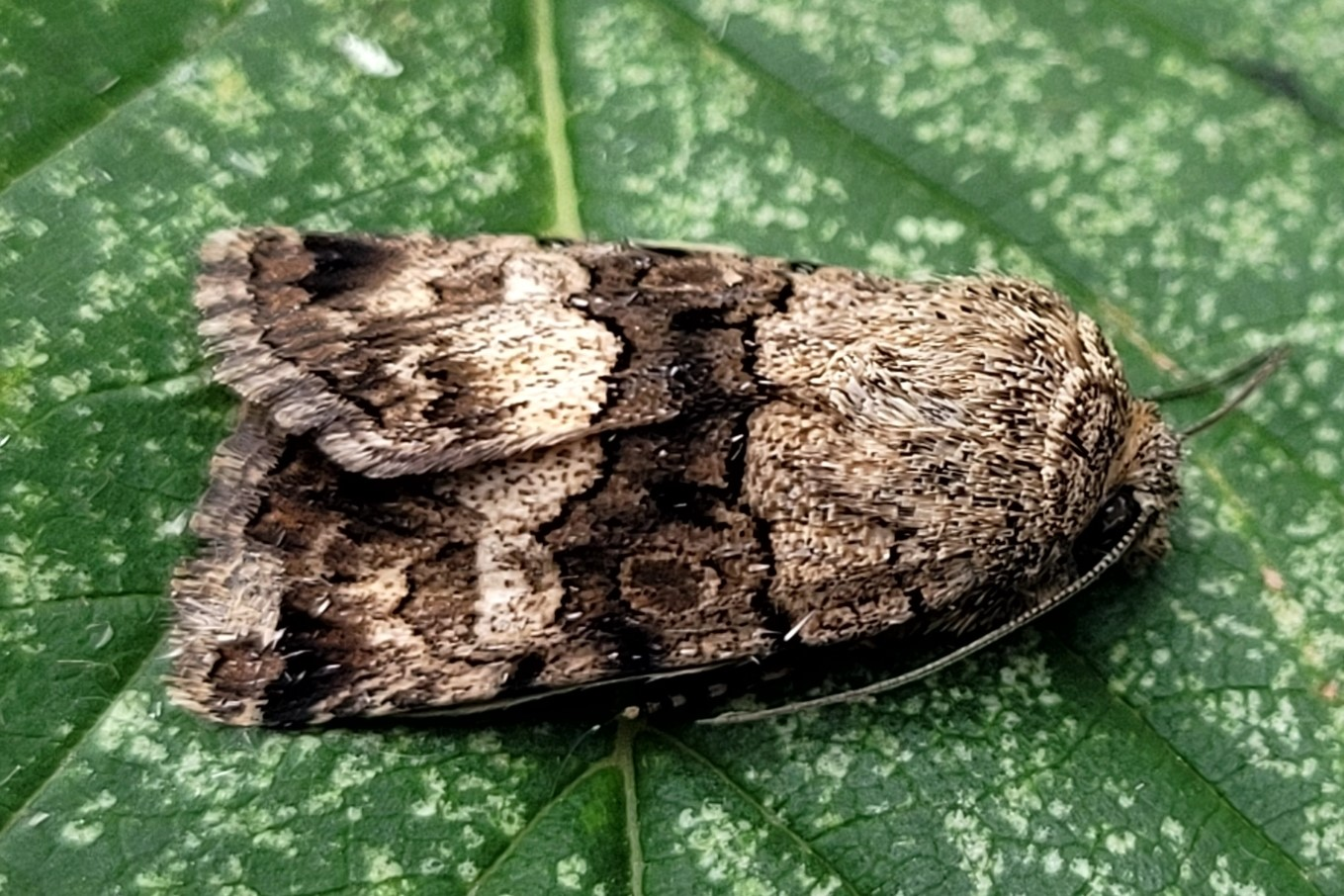
- In Grasslands National Park, Saskatchewan, Canada

Scientific classification
- Kingdom: Animalia
- Phylum: Arthropoda
- Class: Insecta
- Order: Lepidoptera
- Superfamily: Noctuoidea
- Family: Noctuidae
- Genus: Sympistis
- Species: S. albifasciata

Binomial name
- Sympistis albifasciata (Hampson, 1906)

= Sympistis albifasciata =

Species of moth

Sympistis albifasciata is a species of moth in the family Noctuidae (the owlet moths). It is found in North America.
