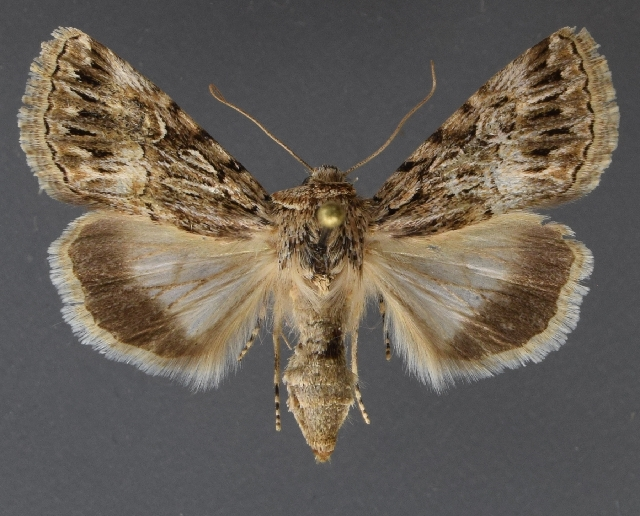

Scientific classification
- Domain: Eukaryota
- Kingdom: Animalia
- Phylum: Arthropoda
- Class: Insecta
- Order: Lepidoptera
- Superfamily: Noctuoidea
- Family: Noctuidae
- Genus: Sympistis
- Species: S. incubus

Binomial name
- Sympistis incubus Troubridge, 2008

= Sympistis incubus =

Species of moth

Sympistis incubus is a moth of the family Noctuidae first described by James T. Troubridge in 2008. It is found in the US states of Washington and Oregon at elevations of 1,800 to 4,500 feet (550 to 1,370 m)

The wingspan is 28 to 35 millimetres (1.1 to 1.4 in). Adults are on wing in September.
