= Sympistis basifugens =

Scientific classification
- Kingdom: Animalia
- Phylum: Arthropoda
- Clade: Pancrustacea
- Class: Insecta
- Order: Lepidoptera
- Superfamily: Noctuoidea
- Family: Noctuidae
- Genus: Sympistis
- Species: S. basifugens

Binomial name
- Sympistis basifugens (Dyar, 1914)

Species of moth

Sympistis basifugens is a species of moth in the family Noctuidae (the owlet moths). It is found in North America.
