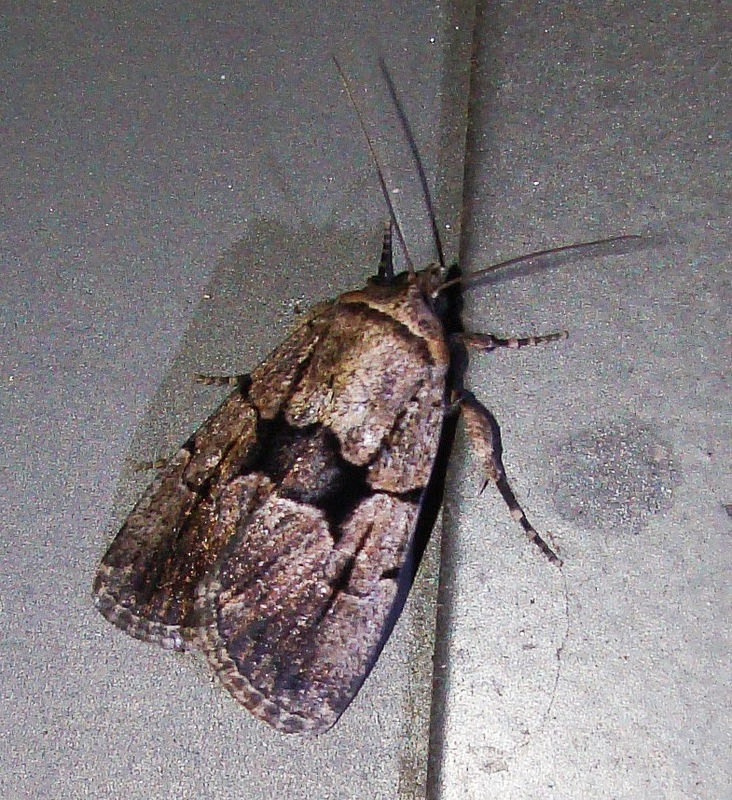

Scientific classification
- Kingdom: Animalia
- Phylum: Arthropoda
- Class: Insecta
- Order: Lepidoptera
- Superfamily: Noctuoidea
- Family: Noctuidae
- Genus: Sympistis
- Species: S. infixa

Binomial name
- Sympistis infixa (Walker, 1856)

= Sympistis infixa =

Species of moth

Sympistis infixa, the broad-lined sallow moth, is a moth in the family Noctuidae (the owlet moths). It was described by Francis Walker in 1856 and is found in North America.

The MONA or Hodges number for Sympistis infixa is 10065.
