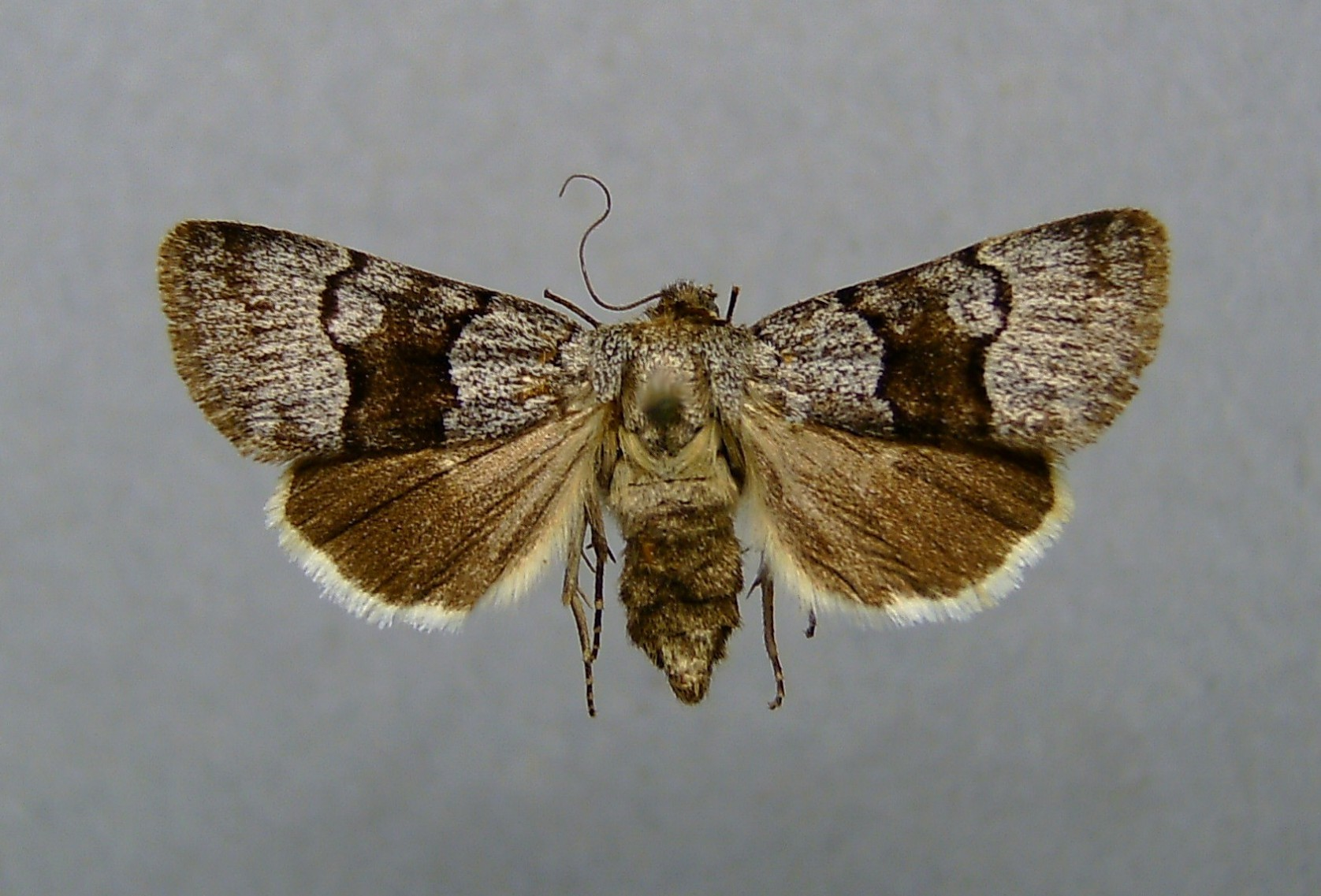
- Sympistis funebris

Scientific classification
- Domain: Eukaryota
- Kingdom: Animalia
- Phylum: Arthropoda
- Class: Insecta
- Order: Lepidoptera
- Superfamily: Noctuoidea
- Family: Noctuidae
- Subfamily: Oncocnemidinae
- Genus: Sympistis; Hübner, 1823

Synonyms
- Lepipolys Guenée, 1852; Oncocnemis Lederer, 1853; Phornacisa Walker, 1862; Homohadena Grote, 1873; Adita Grote, 1874; Copihadena Morrison, 1875; Metahadena Morrison, 1876; Apharetra Grote, 1901; Homoncocnemis Hampson, 1906; ?Anartomorpha Kozchanchikov, 1925; Hemistilbia Barnes & Benjamin, 1929; Funepistis Beck, 1991; Sinupistis Beck, 1996

= Sympistis =

Genus of moths

Sympistis is a genus of moths of the family Noctuidae. The genus was erected by Jacob Hübner in 1823.

== Species ==
- Sympistis acheron Troubridge, 2008
- Sympistis albifasciata (Hampson, 1906)
- Sympistis amenthes Troubridge, 2008
- Sympistis amun Troubridge, 2008
- Sympistis anubis Troubridge, 2008
- Sympistis anweileri Troubridge, 2008
- Sympistis apep Troubridge, 2008
- Sympistis apis Troubridge, 2008
- Sympistis apposita (Barnes & McDunnough, 1918)
- Sympistis aqualis Grote, 1881
- Sympistis arizonensis Barnes, 1928
- Sympistis astrigata Barnes & McDunnough, 1912
- Sympistis aterrima Grote, 1879
- Sympistis atricollaris (Harvey, 1875)
- Sympistis augustus Harvey, 1875
- Sympistis babi Troubridge, 2008
- Sympistis badistriga (Grote, 1872)
- Sympistis bakeri (Dyar, 1905)
- Sympistis baloghi Troubridge, 2008
- Sympistis balteata (Smith, 1902)
- Sympistis barnesii Smith, 1899
- Sympistis basifugens Dyar, 1914
- Sympistis behrensi (Grote, 1874)
- Sympistis benjamini Lindsey, 1923
- Sympistis bes Troubridge, 2008
- Sympistis buchis Troubridge, 2008
- Sympistis buto Troubridge, 2008
- Sympistis californiae (McDunnough, 1946)
- Sympistis campicola Lederer, 1853
- Sympistis chalybdis (Troubridge & Crabo, 1999)
- Sympistis chandleri Grote, 1873
- Sympistis cherti Troubridge, 2008
- Sympistis chionanthi (J. E. Smith, 1797)
- Sympistis chons Troubridge, 2008
- Sympistis chorda Grote, 1880
- Sympistis cibalis Grote, 1880
- Sympistis ciliata Smith, 1900
- Sympistis cleopatra Troubridge, 2008
- Sympistis cocytus Troubridge, 2008
- Sympistis collaris Troubridge, 2008
- Sympistis columbia McDunnough, 1922
- Sympistis confusa Freyer, 1842
- Sympistis coprocolor (Troubridge & Crabo, 1999)
- Sympistis corusca (Smith, 1899)
- Sympistis cottami Blanchard, 1972
- Sympistis curvicollis Grote, 1883
- Sympistis dayi Grote, 1873
- Sympistis deceptiva Barnes & Lindsey, 1922
- Sympistis definita Barnes & McDunnough, 1912
- Sympistis dentata (Grote, 1875)
- Sympistis deserta (Smith, 1891)
- Sympistis dinalda Smith, 1908
- Sympistis dischorda Troubridge, 2008
- Sympistis disfigurata Troubridge, 2008
- Sympistis doris Dimock & Troubridge, 2008
- Sympistis dunbari (Harvey, 1876)
- Sympistis duplex (Troubridge & Mustelin, 2006)
- Sympistis euta Smith, 1903
- Sympistis exacta Christoph, 1887
- Sympistis extranea Smith, 1892
- Sympistis extremis Smith, 1890
- Sympistis fasciata (H. Edwards, 1886)
- Sympistis fifia (Dyar, 1904)
- Sympistis figurata Harvey, 1875
- Sympistis forbesi Zacharczenko & Wagner, 2014
- Sympistis fortis (Grote, 1880)
- Sympistis franclemonti (A. Blanchard, 1968)
- Sympistis funebris Hübner, 1809
- Sympistis glennyi Grote, 1873
- Sympistis goedeni (Troubridge & Crabo, 1999)
- Sympistis greyi Troubridge & Crabo, 1998
- Sympistis griseicollis Grote, 1882
- Sympistis hapi Troubridge, 2008
- Sympistis hathor Troubridge, 2008
- Sympistis hayesi Grote, 1873
- Sympistis helena (Mustelin, 2006)
- Sympistis heliophila Paykull, 1793
- Sympistis heterogena A. Blanchard, 1972
- Sympistis homogena Grote, 1877
- Sympistis horus Troubridge, 2008
- Sympistis ibapahensis Barnes & Benjamin, 1924
- Sympistis incomitata (Harvey, 1875)
- Sympistis inconstans (Grote, 1883)
- Sympistis incubus Troubridge, 2008
- Sympistis induta (Harvey, 1874)
- Sympistis infixa Walker, 1856
- Sympistis insanina Troubridge, 2008
- Sympistis intruda Smith, 1910
- Sympistis iricolor Smith, 1888
- Sympistis isis Troubridge, 2008
- Sympistis jenniferae Troubridge, 2008
- Sympistis jocelynae Troubridge, 2008
- Sympistis kappa Grote, 1874
- Sympistis kelloggi H. Edwards, 1875
- Sympistis kelsoensis (Robertson & Mustelin, 2006)
- Sympistis khem Troubridge, 2008
- Sympistis khepri Troubridge, 2008
- Sympistis knudsoni Troubridge, 2008
- Sympistis lachrymosa Troubridge, 2008
- Sympistis lacticollis Smith, 1908
- Sympistis lapponica Thunberg, 1791
- Sympistis laticosta (Dyar, 1904)
- Sympistis lepipoloides McDunnough, 1922
- Sympistis levis Grote, 1880
- Sympistis linda Barnes & McDunnough, 1913
- Sympistis mackiei Barnes & Benjamin, 1924
- Sympistis major Grote, 1881
- Sympistis meadiana Morrison, 1875
- Sympistis melalutea (Smith, 1899)
- Sympistis melantho Smith, 1899
- Sympistis min Troubridge, 2008
- Sympistis minor Barnes, 1928
- Sympistis mirificalis Grote, 1879
- Sympistis modesta McDunnough, 1933
- Sympistis mut Troubridge, 2008
- Sympistis nenun Troubridge, 2008
- Sympistis nigricula Eversmann, 1847
- Sympistis nigrita (Boisduval, 1840)
- Sympistis nigrocaput Smith, 1892
- Sympistis nita Smith, 1910
- Sympistis obscurata Barnes & McDunnough, 1912
- Sympistis occata (Grote, 1875)
- Sympistis opleri Troubridge, 2008
- Sympistis orbicularis (Barnes & McDunnough, 1912)
- Sympistis osiris Troubridge, 2008
- Sympistis pachet Troubridge, 2008
- Sympistis pallida Barnes, 1928
- Sympistis pallidior Barnes, 1928
- Sympistis parvacana (Troubridge & Crabo, 1999)
- Sympistis parvanigra Blackmore, 1923
- Sympistis pernotata Grote, 1883
- Sympistis perscripta (Guenée, 1852)
- Sympistis picina (Grote, 1880)
- Sympistis piffardi (Walker, 1862)
- Sympistis poliafascies (Dyar, 1910)
- Sympistis polingii (Barnes, 1904)
- Sympistis poliochroa (Hampson, 1906)
- Sympistis ptah Troubridge, 2008
- Sympistis pudorata Smith, 1893
- Sympistis punctilinea Hampson, 1906
- Sympistis ra Troubridge, 2008
- Sympistis ragani Barnes, 1928
- Sympistis rayata (Smith, 1908)
- Sympistis regina Smith, 1902
- Sympistis richersi Troubridge, 2008
- Sympistis riparia Morrison, 1875
- Sympistis rosea Smith, 1903
- Sympistis rustica (Barnes & McDunnough, 1911)
- Sympistis sagittata Barnes & McDunnough, 1916
- Sympistis sakhmet Troubridge, 2008
- Sympistis sandaraca Buckett & Bauer, 1967
- Sympistis sanina Smith, 1910
- Sympistis satanella (Troubridge & Crabo, 1999)
- Sympistis saundersiana (Grote, 1876)
- Sympistis saxatilis (Troubridge & Crabo, 1999)
- Sympistis sectilis (Smith, 1894)
- Sympistis sectiloides (Barnes & McDunnough, 1913)
- Sympistis semicollaris Smith, 1909
- Sympistis senica Eversmann, 1856
- Sympistis septu Troubridge, 2008
- Sympistis sesmu Troubridge, 2008
- Sympistis seth Troubridge, 2008
- Sympistis shait Troubridge, 2008
- Sympistis shirleyae Troubridge, 2008
- Sympistis simplex Smith, 1888
- Sympistis singularis Barnes & McDunnough, 1912
- Sympistis sobek Troubridge, 2008
- Sympistis sokar Troubridge, 2008
- Sympistis sorapis Troubridge, 2008
- Sympistis stabilis (Smith, 1895)
- Sympistis strioligera Lederer, 1853
- Sympistis subsimplex (Dyar, 1904)
- Sympistis tartarea (Troubridge & Crabo, 1999)
- Sympistis tenuifascia Smith, 1888
- Sympistis terminalis (Smith, 1888)
- Sympistis tetrops Dyar, 1904
- Sympistis toddi Blanchard, 1968
- Sympistis umbrifascia (Smith, 1894)
- Sympistis utahensis Barnes & Benjamin, 1924
- Sympistis viriditincta Smith, 1894
- Sympistis wilsonensis (Hill, 1924)
- Sympistis wilsoni Barnes & Benjamin, 1924
- Sympistis youngi McDunnough, 1922
