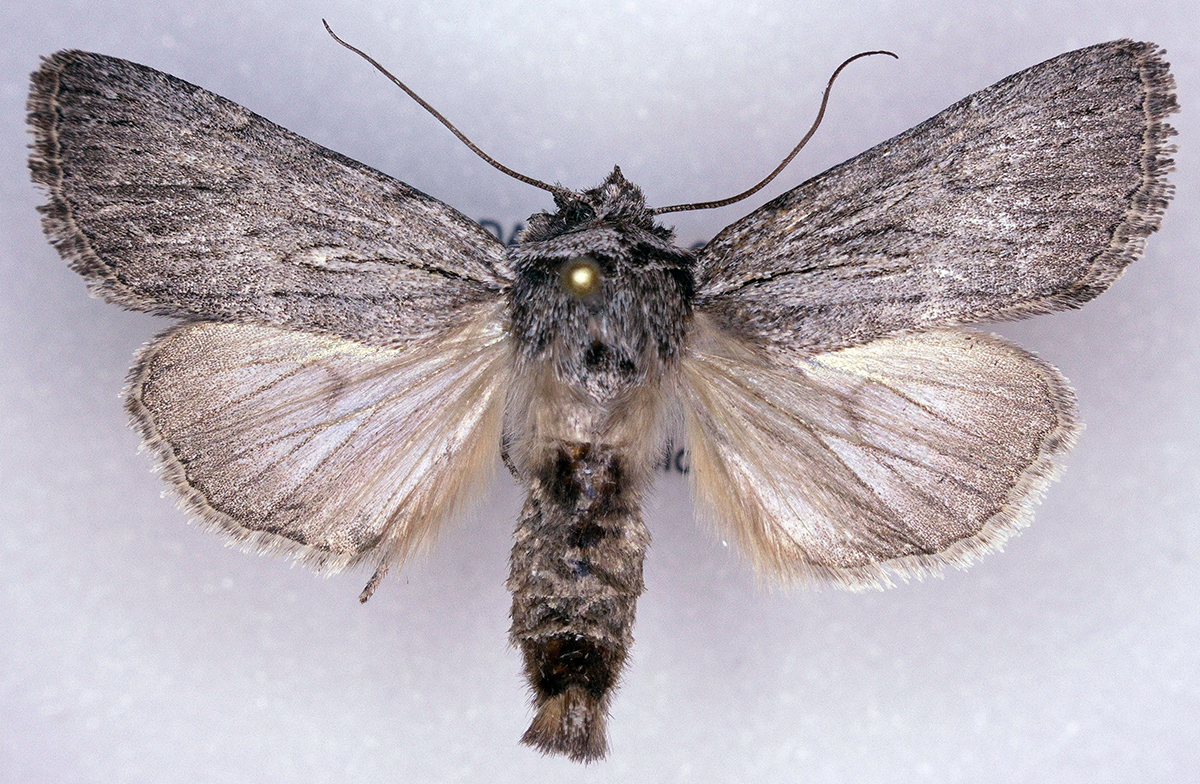

Scientific classification
- Domain: Eukaryota
- Kingdom: Animalia
- Phylum: Arthropoda
- Class: Insecta
- Order: Lepidoptera
- Superfamily: Noctuoidea
- Family: Noctuidae
- Genus: Sympistis
- Species: S. amun

Binomial name
- Sympistis amun Troubridge, 2008

= Sympistis amun =

Species of moth

Sympistis amun is a species of moth in the family Noctuidae. It was first described by James T. Troubridge in 2008. It is found in western North America from southwestern Alberta to British Columbia, southward to northern California at altitudes of about 5,400 feet (1,600 metres).

Its habitat are dry mountainous forests.

The wingspan is 32–39 mm (1.3–1.5 in). Adults are on wing from June to August.
