= Sympistis doris =

Scientific classification
- Domain: Eukaryota
- Kingdom: Animalia
- Phylum: Arthropoda
- Class: Insecta
- Order: Lepidoptera
- Superfamily: Noctuoidea
- Family: Noctuidae
- Genus: Sympistis
- Species: S. doris

Binomial name
- Sympistis doris Dimock & Troubridge, 2008

Species of moth

Sympistis doris is a moth of the family Noctuidae first described by Thomas E. Dimock and James T. Troubridge in 2008. It is found in California.

The wingspan is about 30 mm.
