= Sympistis poliafascies =

Scientific classification
- Domain: Eukaryota
- Kingdom: Animalia
- Phylum: Arthropoda
- Class: Insecta
- Order: Lepidoptera
- Superfamily: Noctuoidea
- Family: Noctuidae
- Genus: Sympistis
- Species: S. poliafascies

Binomial name
- Sympistis poliafascies (Dyar, 1910)

Species of moth

Sympistis poliafascies is a species of moth in the family Noctuidae (the owlet moths).

The MONA or Hodges number for Sympistis poliafascies is 10152.
