= Sympistis sobek =

Scientific classification
- Domain: Eukaryota
- Kingdom: Animalia
- Phylum: Arthropoda
- Class: Insecta
- Order: Lepidoptera
- Superfamily: Noctuoidea
- Family: Noctuidae
- Genus: Sympistis
- Species: S. sobek

Binomial name
- Sympistis sobek Troubridge, 2008

Species of moth

Sympistis sobek is a moth of the family Noctuidae. It is found in Oregon.

The wingspan is about 34 mm.
