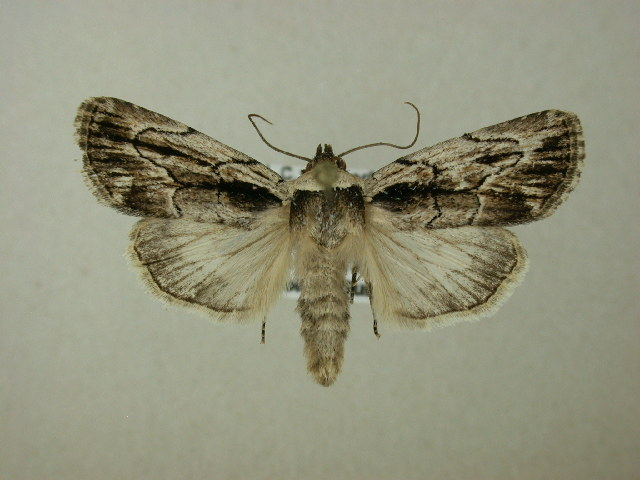

Scientific classification
- Domain: Eukaryota
- Kingdom: Animalia
- Phylum: Arthropoda
- Class: Insecta
- Order: Lepidoptera
- Superfamily: Noctuoidea
- Family: Noctuidae
- Genus: Sympistis
- Species: S. badistriga

Binomial name
- Sympistis badistriga (Grote, 1872)

= Sympistis badistriga =

Species of moth

Sympistis badistriga, the brown-lined sallow, is a species of moth in the family Noctuidae (the owlet moths).

The MONA or Hodges number for Sympistis badistriga is 10059.
