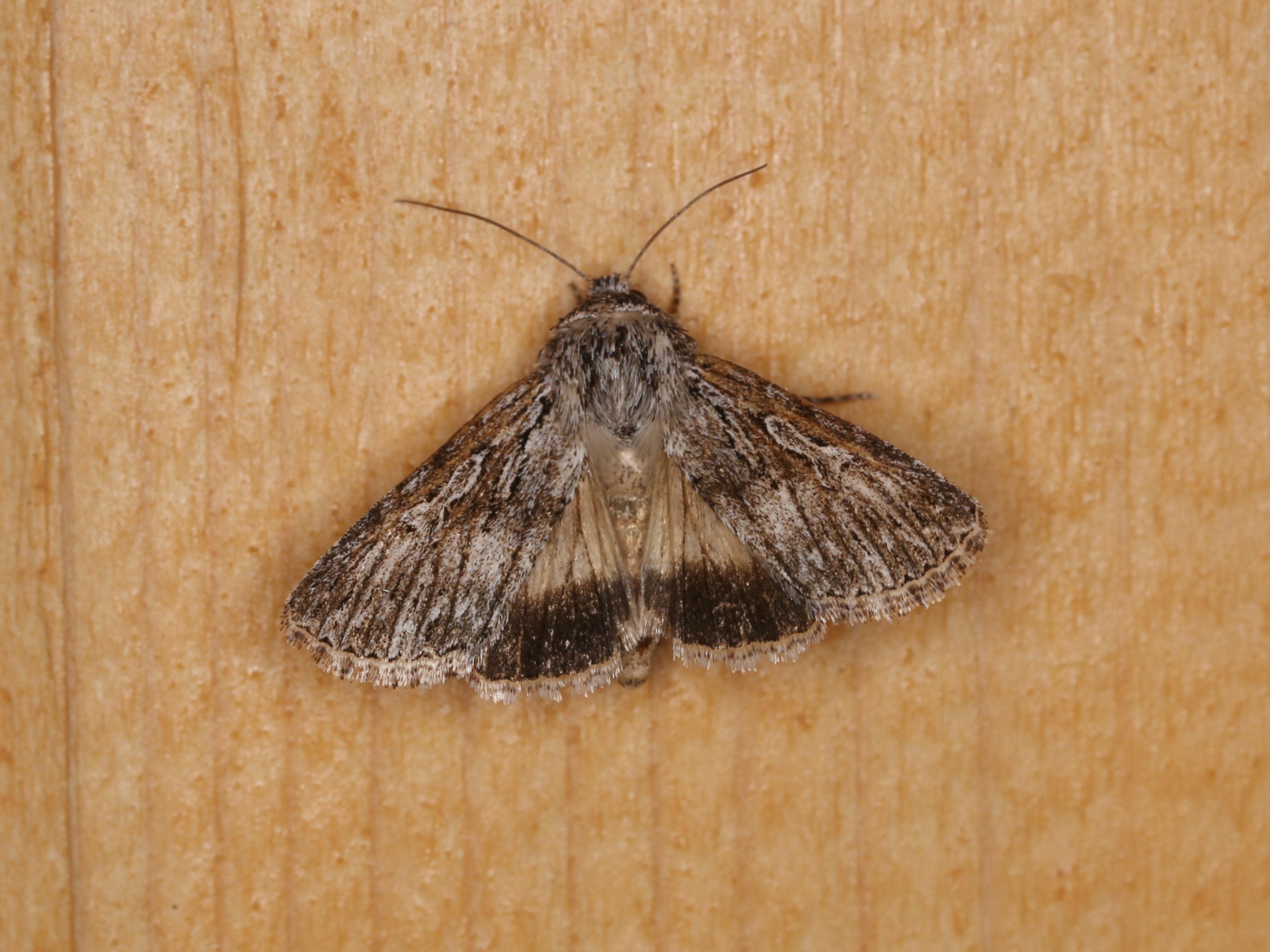
- Sympistis poliochroa

Scientific classification
- Kingdom: Animalia
- Phylum: Arthropoda
- Class: Insecta
- Order: Lepidoptera
- Superfamily: Noctuoidea
- Family: Noctuidae
- Genus: Sympistis
- Species: S. poliochroa

Binomial name
- Sympistis poliochroa (Hampson, 1906)

= Sympistis poliochroa =

Species of moth

Sympistis poliochroa is a species of moth in the family Noctuidae (the owlet moths).

The MONA or Hodges number for Sympistis poliochroa is 10094.4.
