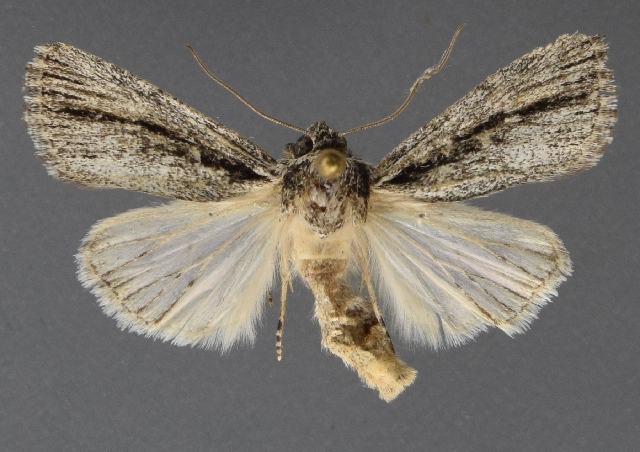

Scientific classification
- Domain: Eukaryota
- Kingdom: Animalia
- Phylum: Arthropoda
- Class: Insecta
- Order: Lepidoptera
- Superfamily: Noctuoidea
- Family: Noctuidae
- Genus: Sympistis
- Species: S. atricollaris

Binomial name
- Sympistis atricollaris (Harvey, 1875)

= Sympistis atricollaris =

Species of moth

Sympistis atricollaris is a species of moth in the family Noctuidae (the owlet moths).

The MONA or Hodges number for Sympistis atricollaris is 10128.
