= Sand penstemon (disambiguation) =

List of plants with the same or similar names

Sand penstemon is a common name for three species of plant and may refer to:

- Penstemon acuminatus, also known as the sand-dune penstemon, from the intermountain western US
- Penstemon arenicola, also known as Red Desert penstemon, from Colorado and Utah
- Penstemon ambiguus, also known as pink plains penstemon, from the southwestern US and southern Great Plains
