= Bush penstemon (disambiguation) =

List of plants with the same or similar names

Bush penstemon is a common name of four species of plant:

- Keckiella antirrhinoides, a species formerly placed in the genus Penstemon from the Mojave Desert and Sonoran Deserts
- Keckiella ternata, a species formerly placed in the genus Penstemon from southern and Baja California
- Penstemon ambiguus, a penstemon from the southern western United States and northern Mexico
- Penstemon fruticosus, a penstemon from the Pacific Northwest of North America
