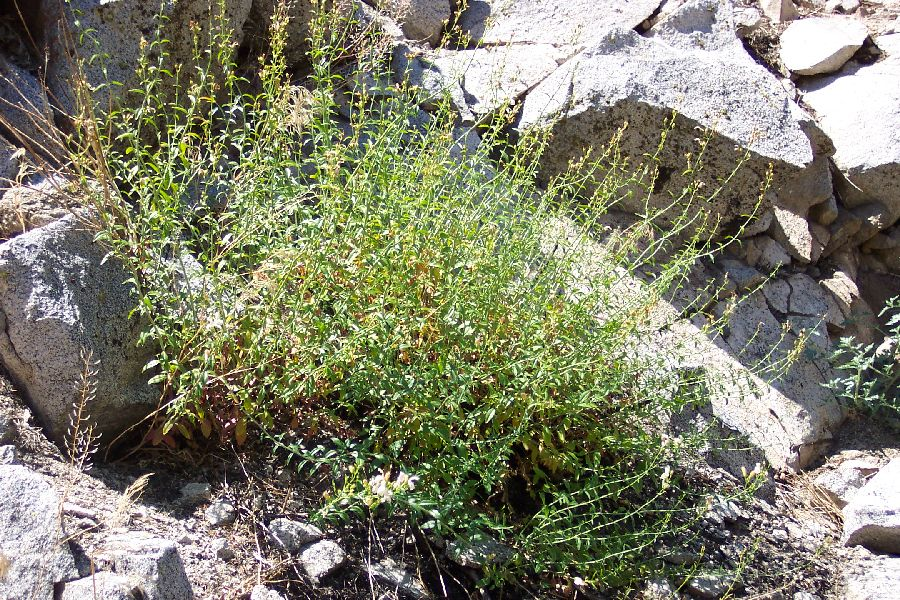
- Keckiella breviflora

Scientific classification
- Kingdom: Plantae
- Clade: Embryophytes
- Clade: Tracheophytes
- Clade: Spermatophytes
- Clade: Angiosperms
- Clade: Eudicots
- Clade: Asterids
- Order: Lamiales
- Family: Plantaginaceae
- Tribe: Cheloneae
- Genus: Keckiella; Straw

Species
- 7 - See text

= Keckiella =

Genus of flowering plants

Keckiella is a genus of plants in the plantain family. It includes several species of plants known commonly as keckiellas. A few species may be called beardtongues or penstemons because all keckiellas once belonged to genus Penstemon as the section Hesperothamnus. Keckiellas are native to the American southwest, especially California. They bloom in attractive snapdragon-like flowers. Genus Keckiella was named after the American botanist David D. Keck.

== Taxonomy ==
What is now called Keckiella was first described as a genus named Lepidostemon in 1862 by Charles Antoine Lemaire. However, this was an illegitimate name due to its prior use by Carl Ludwig Blume in 1826. It was described with the name Keckia in 1966 by Richard Myron Straw, but as this was also nomen illegitimum he revised the name to Keckiella in 1967. It is classified in the Plantaginaceae family. Prior to their reclassification all seven species in the genus were in the Penstemon genus.

Table of Species
Scientific name	Original year	Common name	Range
Keckiella antirrhinoides (Benth.) Straw	1846	snapdragon penstemon, yellow bush snapdragon	Southern California, Baja California, & Sonora
Keckiella breviflora (Lindl.) Straw	1837	bush beardtongue, gaping beardtongue	California & Nevada
Keckiella cordifolia (Benth.) Straw	1835	heartleaf keckiella, climbing penstemon	Southern California, the Channel Islands, & Baja California
Keckiella corymbosa (Benth. ex A.DC.) Straw	1846	redwood keckiella	Central & northern California
Keckiella lemmonii (A.Gray) Straw	1876	Lemmon's keckiella	Northern California & western Nevada
Keckiella rothrockii (A.Gray) Straw	1878	Rothrock's keckiella, Rothrock's penstemon	Central, northern California, & western Nevada
Keckiella ternata (Torr. ex A.Gray) Straw	1859	scarlet keckiella	Central, northern California, & Baja California
