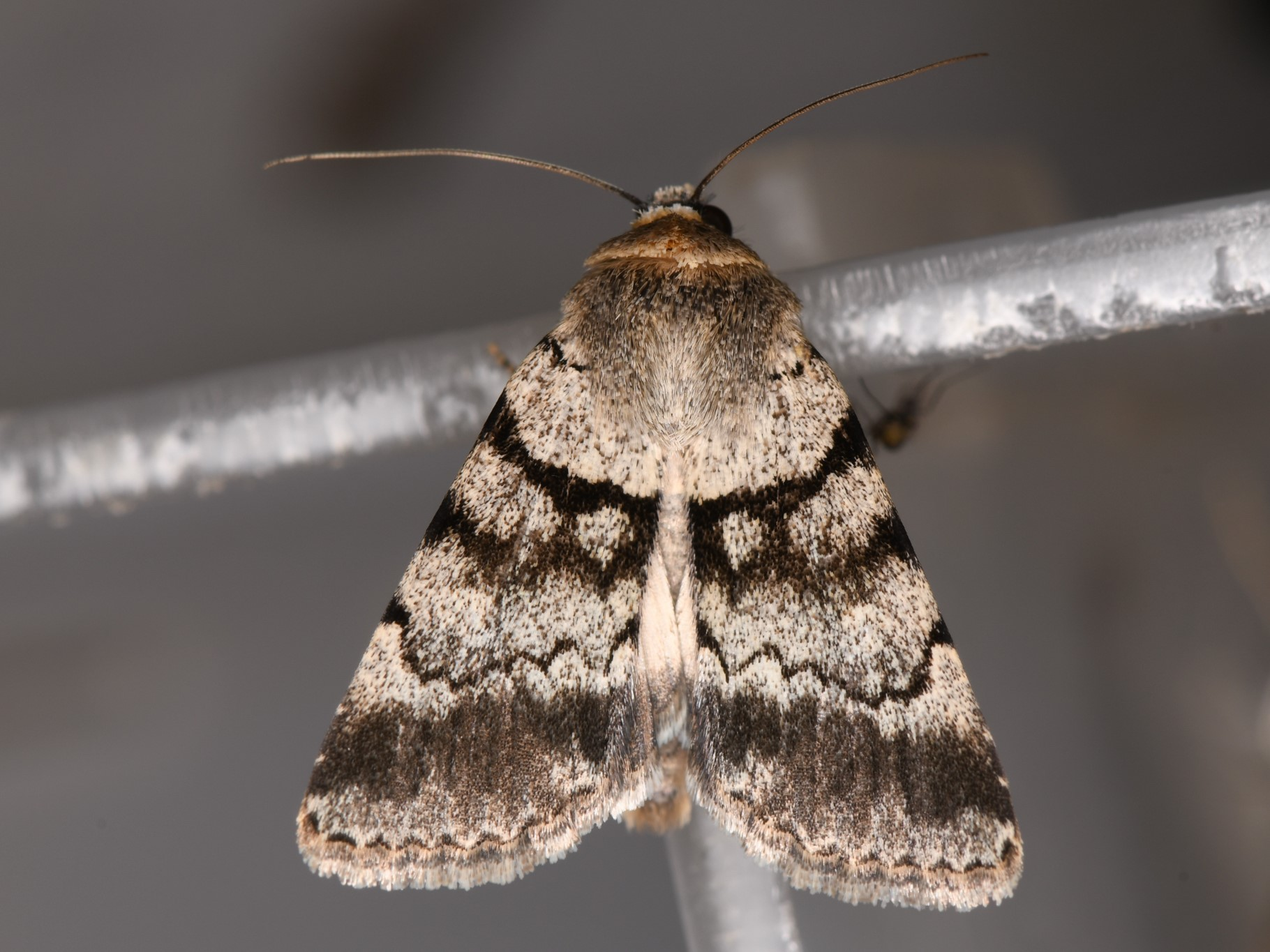

Scientific classification
- Domain: Eukaryota
- Kingdom: Animalia
- Phylum: Arthropoda
- Class: Insecta
- Order: Lepidoptera
- Superfamily: Noctuoidea
- Family: Noctuidae
- Genus: Sympistis
- Species: S. extremis

Binomial name
- Sympistis extremis Smith, 1890

Synonyms
- Oncocnemis chorda extremis; Oncocnemis extremis

= Sympistis extremis =

Species of moth

Sympistis extremis is a species of moth in the family Noctuidae first described by Smith in 1890. It is found in western North America from British Columbia to Washington and Oregon. It was formerly known as Oncocnemis chorda extremis, a subspecies of Oncocnemis chorda, but was elevated to species level as Oncocnemis extremis in 1999 and transferred to the genus Sympistis in 2008.

The wingspan is 30–34 mm.

The larvae feed on Penstemon species, particularly Penstemon fruticosus.
