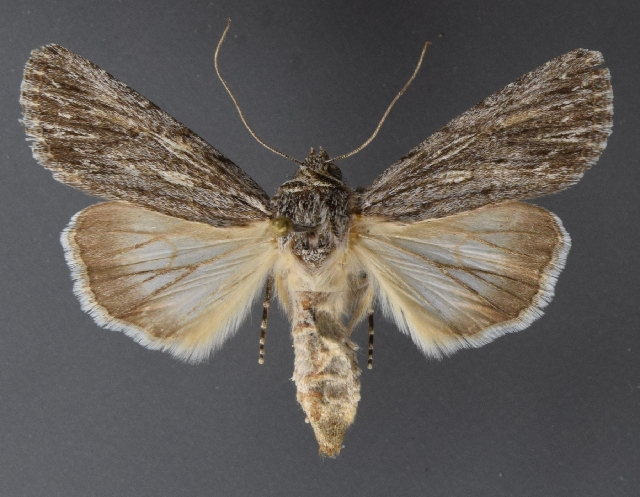

Scientific classification
- Domain: Eukaryota
- Kingdom: Animalia
- Phylum: Arthropoda
- Class: Insecta
- Order: Lepidoptera
- Superfamily: Noctuoidea
- Family: Noctuidae
- Genus: Sympistis
- Species: S. major

Binomial name
- Sympistis major Grote, 1881

Synonyms
- Oncocnemis riparia major; Oncocnemis major; Sympistis deserticola McDunnough, 1941

= Sympistis major =

Species of moth

Sympistis major is a moth of the family Noctuidae first described by Augustus Radcliffe Grote in 1881. It is widely distributed in the Pacific Northwest of North America. It was formerly known as Oncocnemis riparia major, a subspecies of Oncocnemis riparia, but was elevated to species level as Oncocnemis major in 1999 and transferred to the genus Sympistis in 2008.

The wingspan is 31–36 mm.

The larvae feed on Penstemon species, particularly Penstemon fruticosus.
