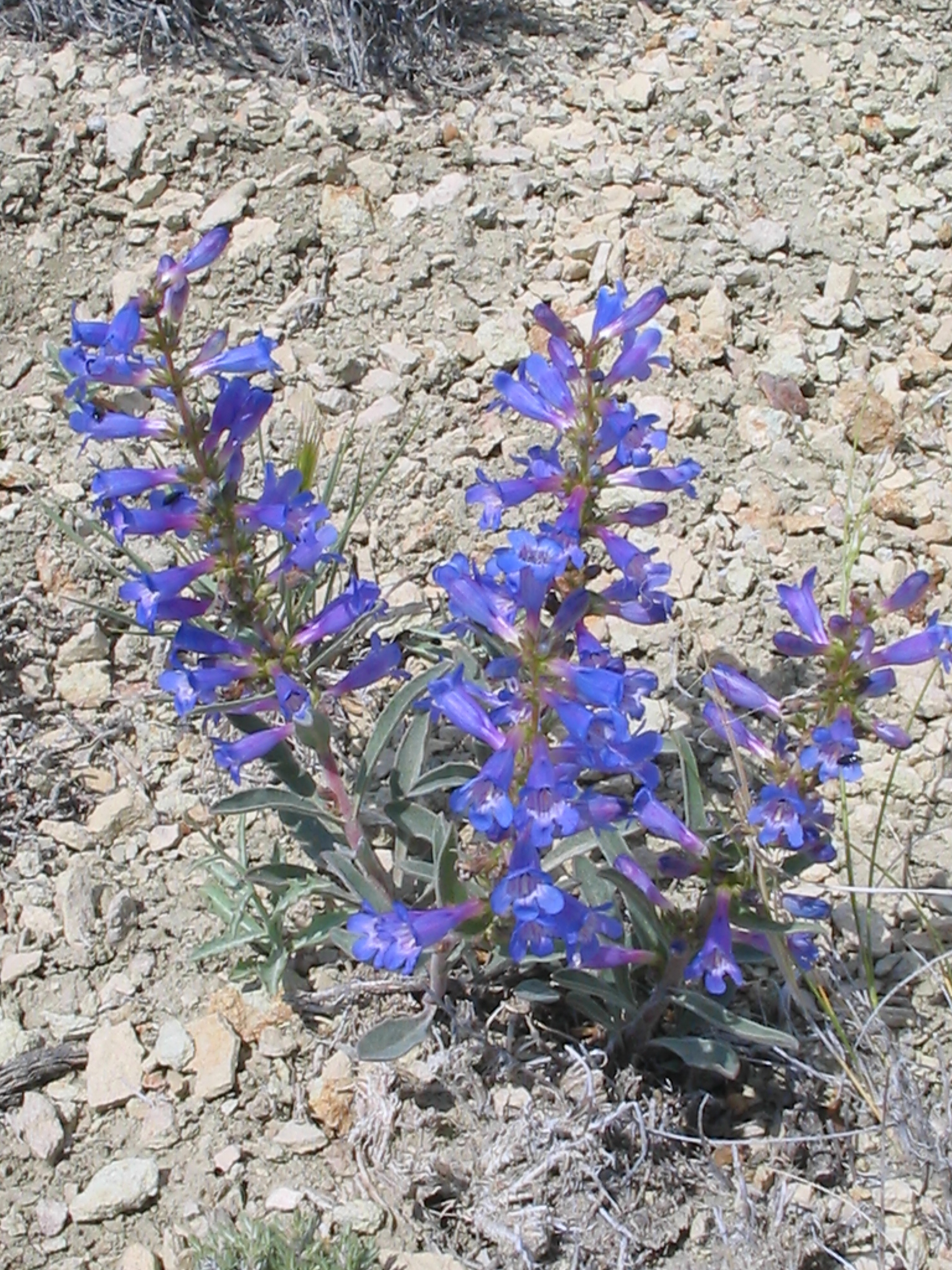

Conservation status
- Vulnerable (NatureServe)

Scientific classification
- Kingdom: Plantae
- Clade: Tracheophytes
- Clade: Angiosperms
- Clade: Eudicots
- Clade: Asterids
- Order: Lamiales
- Family: Plantaginaceae
- Genus: Penstemon
- Species: P. arenicola

Binomial name
- Penstemon arenicola A.Nelson

= Penstemon arenicola =

Plant species in the family

Penstemon arenicola, commonly known as Red Desert penstemon, is a species of plant from the Western United States. It primarily grows in Wyoming, but it also grows in small areas of Colorado and Utah. It is a short plant known for growing in sand as referenced by its scientific name.

== Description ==
Penstemon arenicola is a herbaceous plant with leaves that grow from its base and also from its flowering stems. The plants are of a small size, the flowering stems usually reaching just 7–18 centimeters (2 3/4–7 in), but occasionally as short as 4 cm (1 1/2 in) or as tall as 30 cm (12 in). Its leaves and stems grow from a woody branched structure atop its taproot, called a caudex.

The leaves are smooth and fleshy, with a blue-green color from being covered in natural waxes (glaucous). The basal leaves and the ones lowest on the flowering stems are 2.1–7 centimeters long, but usually less than 5 cm. They are quite narrow, just 4–17 millimeters wide. They resemble a spoon or reversed spear head, with the widest portion towards the end of the leaf and either a rounded to pointed tip, sometimes with the midrib extending past the rest of the leaf blade. On the flowering stem there are two to five pairs of leaves. The lower leaves are attached by a short leaf stem, a petiole, to the larger stem while the upper ones are sessile, with their base directly attached to the stem.

=== Flowering ===
The flowers are grouped in four to nine points along the stem called verticillasters where the flower stalks attach in a pair of spots on opposite sides of the stem. They are packed closely together on the thyrse, which may be 3–14 centimeters long. The tubular flower may be 10–15 millimeters long and is blue to violet in color. Outside the flower is hairless while the inside has sparsely scattered white hairs and red-violet nectar guide lines. The staminode is densely covered in golden hairs at its end and extends slightly beyond the opening of the flower.

The seed capsules are 6–12 millimeters long and 5–6 mm wide. The seeds contained within are 2–3 mm in size.

== Taxonomy ==
This species was scientifically described by the botanist Aven Nelson in 1898. It has no botanical synonyms or subdivisions. The first scientific collection was 1 June 1897 by Nelson near Point of Rocks, Wyoming.

=== Names ===
The species name, arenicola, means growing in sand in botanical Latin. It has the common name Red Desert penstemon for the Red Desert region of Wyoming where it is found. It is also sometimes known as sand penstemon, however other species including Penstemon acuminatus and very commonly Penstemon ambiguus are also called this.

== Range and habitat ==
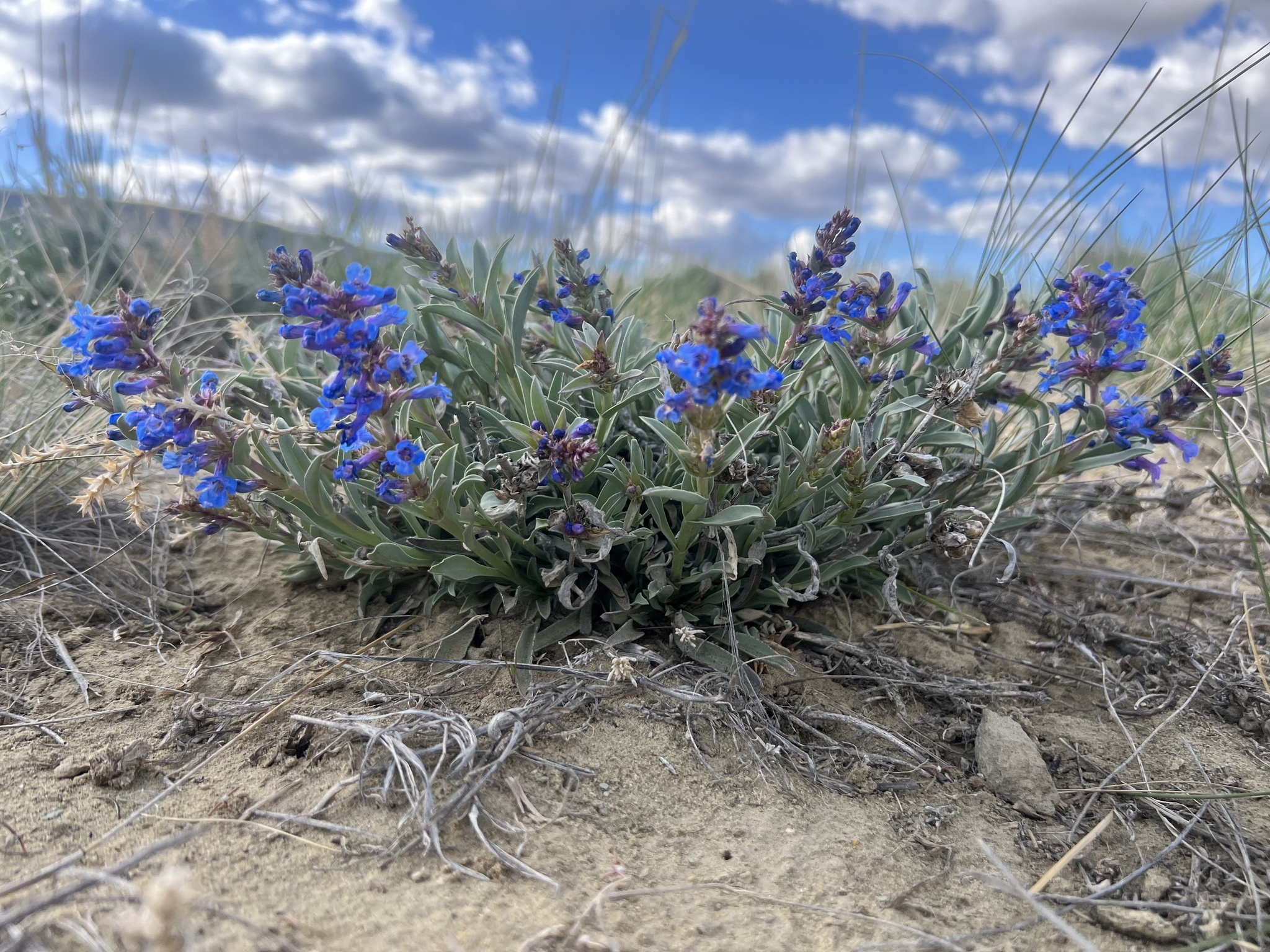
Penstemon arenicola flowering near Rock Springs, Sweetwater County, Wyoming

According to the USDA Penstemon arenicola grows in most of western Wyoming as well as the very northwestern corner of Colorado in Moffat County and adjacent Daggett County and Uintah County, Utah. It can be found between elevations of 1,800–2,400 meters (5,900–7,900 ft).

The species prefers to grow in sandy soils or in broken shale rocks on plains, hills, and bluffs in sagebrush steppes. It was last evaluated by NatureServe in 1992, at that time they evaluated it as globally "vulnerable" (G3). In Wyoming they list it as "apparently secure" (S4) and "critically imperiled" (S1) in Colorado.

== Cultivation ==
Red Desert penstemon is occasionally cultivated, both inside and outside its natural range by rock gardeners. In a garden setting they need a well draining growing medium such as sand or gravel in full sun. They are grown from seed, which require eight weeks of cool-moist stratification followed by variable temperatures to sprout. A very small number of seeds, 17% in an experiment, will sprout when planted at 21 °C (70 °F).

== See also ==
List of Penstemon species
