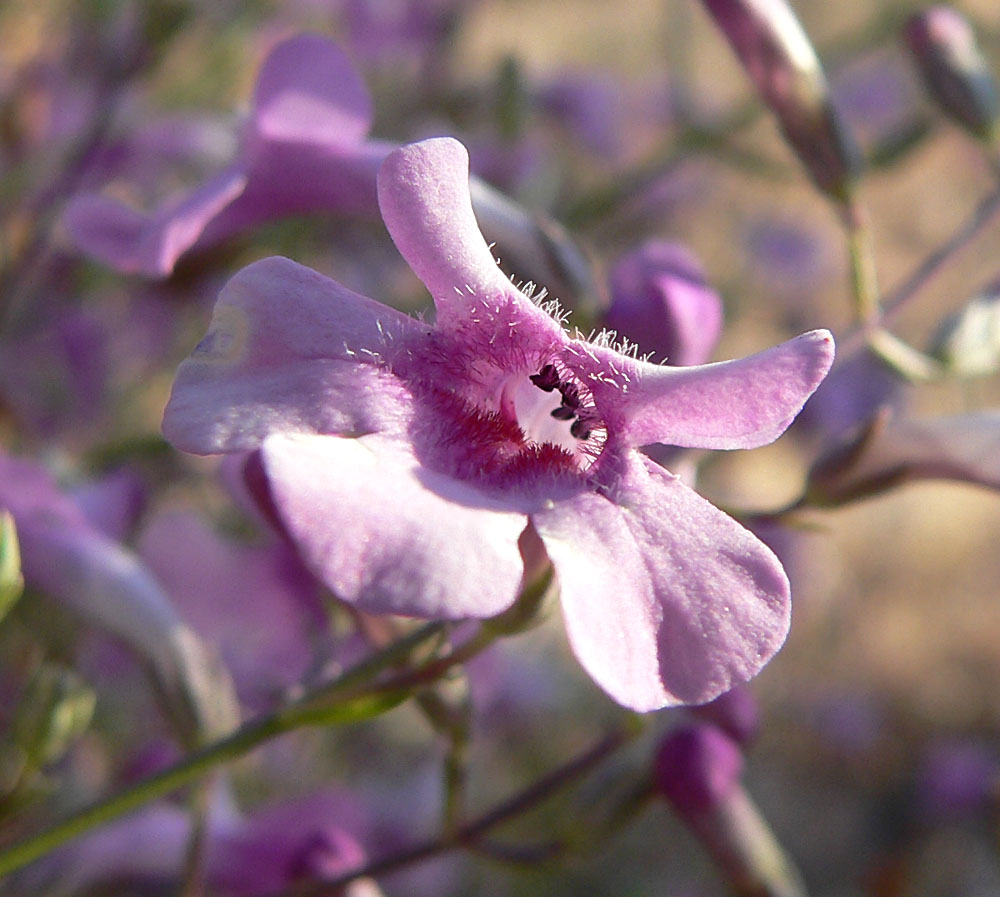
- Penstemon ambiguus var. laevissimus

Conservation status
- Apparently Secure (NatureServe)

Scientific classification
- Kingdom: Plantae
- Clade: Embryophytes
- Clade: Tracheophytes
- Clade: Spermatophytes
- Clade: Angiosperms
- Clade: Eudicots
- Clade: Asterids
- Order: Lamiales
- Family: Plantaginaceae
- Genus: Penstemon
- Species: P. ambiguus

Binomial name
- Penstemon ambiguus Torr.

Varieties
- Penstemon ambiguus var. ambiguus; Penstemon ambiguus var. laevissimus (D.D.Keck) N.H.Holmgren

Synonyms
- Leiostemon ambiguus (Torr.) Greene

= Penstemon ambiguus =

Species of flowering plant

Penstemon ambiguus, commonly known as the sand penstemon, pink plains penstemon, or gilia penstemon is a species of Penstemon that grows in the shortgrass prairies and deserts of the western United States and northern Mexico. This bush-like penstemon grows in sandy, loose, and creosote soils and is particularly known for the spectacular flowering show it produces, sometime seasons turning whole hillsides bright pink–white.

== Description ==
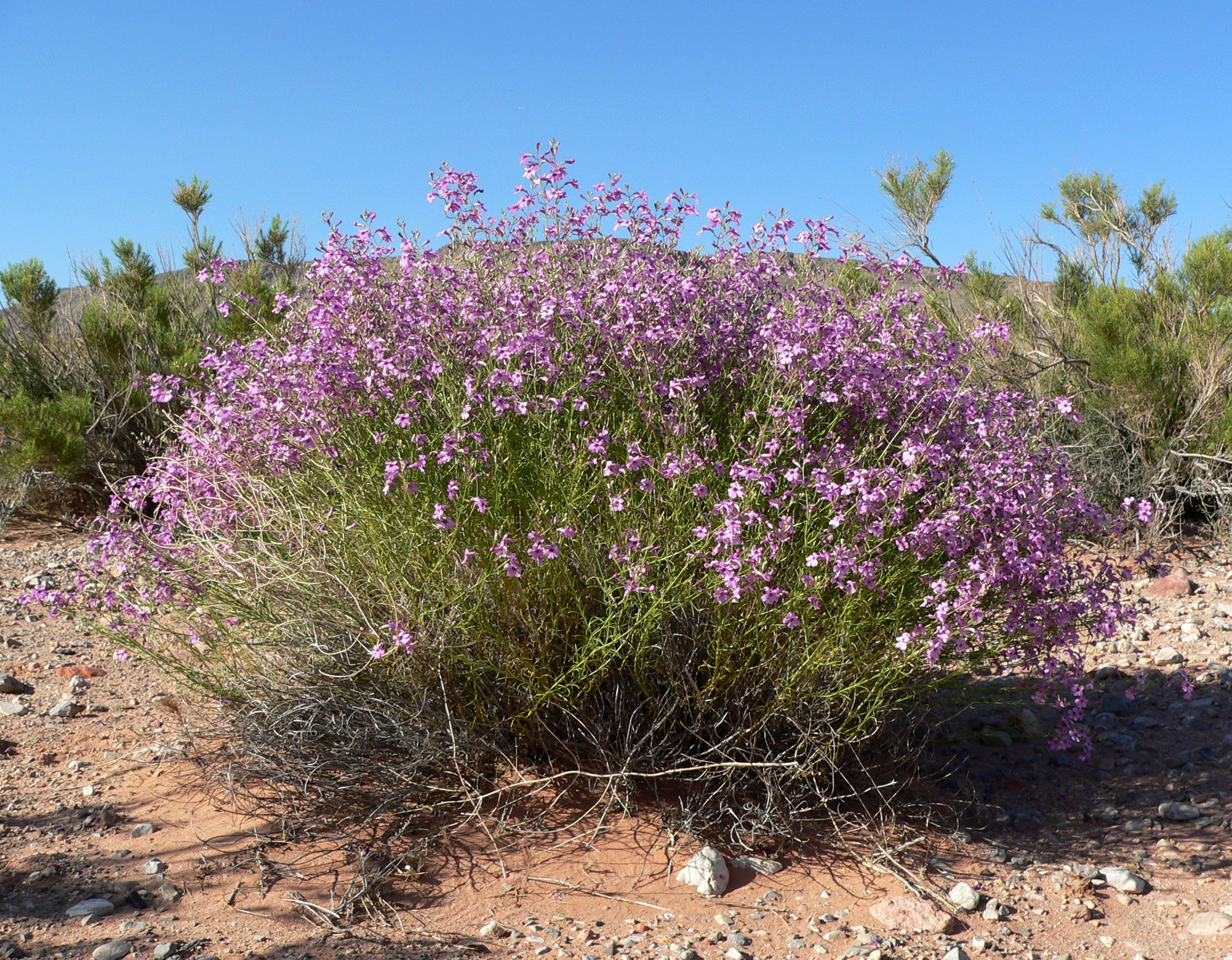
Penstemon ambiguus var. laevissimus in wash, Red Rock Canyon, Spring Mountains, southern Nevada (elev. about 1100 m)

Penstemon ambiguus is a perennial, somewhat bushy species with stems that are woody at their base (suffrutescent). The stems are generally 30–40 cm tall, but will sometimes be as short as 20 cm or as tall as 60 cm, and are either smooth or somewhat rough near the base. They have paired leaves that taper from base to the tip, most often 5–30 mm long and only 0.5–1 mm wide, but occasionally as wide as 2.5 mm and as short as 3 mm or as long as 40 mm. The edges of the leaves are either smooth or somewhat rough. The tips of the leaves taper to the point or have an extended leaf rib at the end (acuminate or mucronate).

The plants are relatively shallowly rooted with the majority of their roots within three centimeters of the soil surface. Though a few roots may reach depths of three meters into the soil.

=== Flowers ===
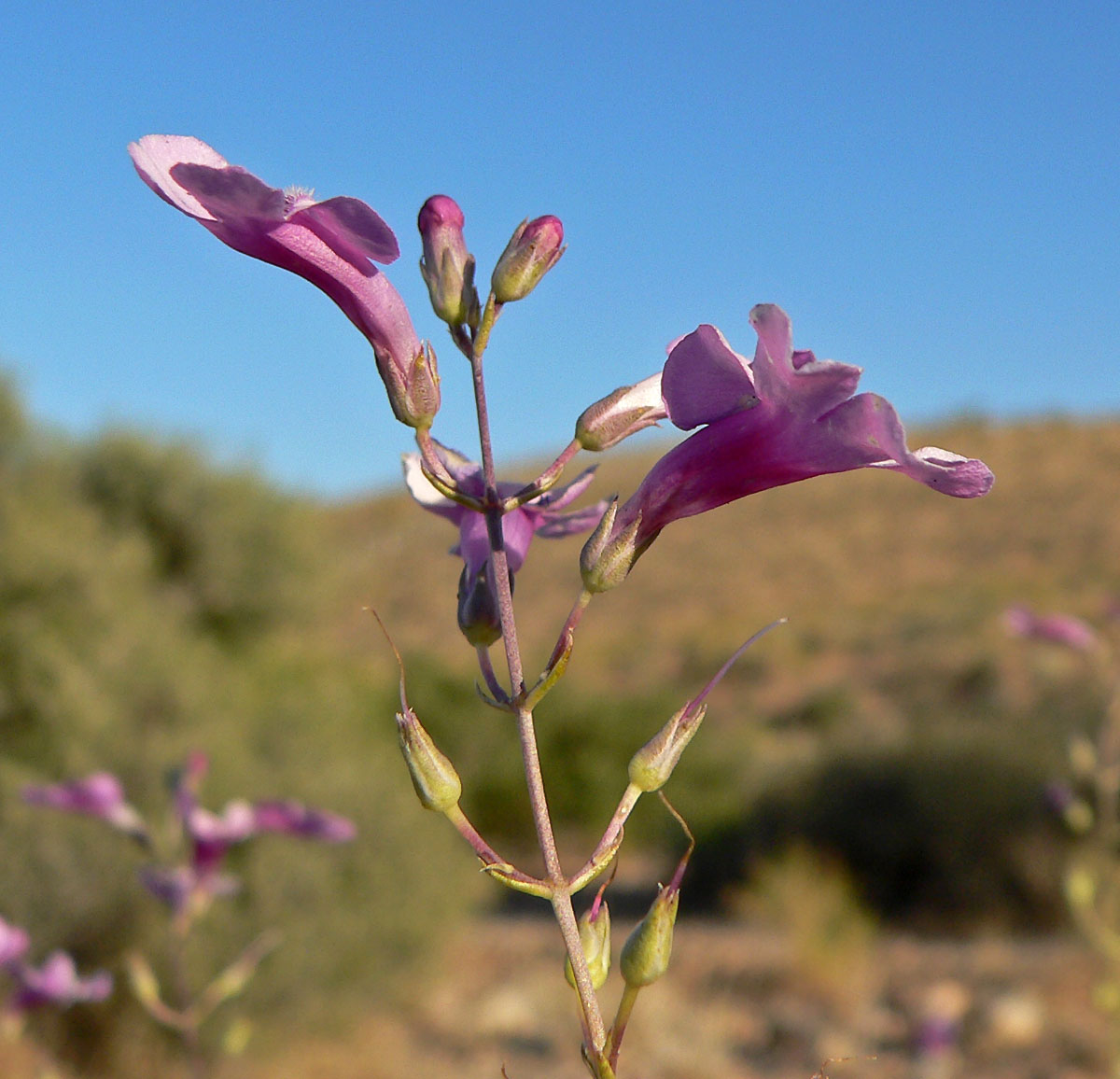
Penstemon ambiguus showing flowering stem, corolla, and buds

Penstemon ambiguus most often blooms from late May to late August, with occasional blooms as late as September. The smooth to rough flowering stems are between 6 and 15 cm in height. The flowering stem is a thyrse with 6–10 groups of flowers on the stem, with each group containing 1–3 flowers. The bracts near the flowers are linear, very narrow and short, just 6–33 mm long and 0.3–1.5 mm wide, and usually shorter than 27 mm. Each flower is supported by an individual short stem (a peduncle or pedicels) with a smooth to rough texture, like the rest of the stems and leaves.

The flowers have five ovate lobes, two above and three below and a fused funnel shaped flower. The petals and tube of the flower are pastel shades of pink with the outermost part sometimes milky pink or milky white. The outside of the flower is smooth, but the inside of flower will have two lines of fine, short, hairs and reddish-purple nectar guides. As a whole, the flower will be 16–22 mm long, with a tube width of 3–4 mm and an internal diameter of 3–5 mm. The stamens are kept within the tube of the flower and the pollen sacs on the stamens are 0.5–0.6 mm in size. The staminode, or fuzzy tongue, of the flower is 7–9 mm long. The flowers are also fragrant.

The seed capsules are typical of penstemon, four valved capsules shaped like a teardrop 6–9 mm in length and 3–5 mm in width.

== Taxonomy ==
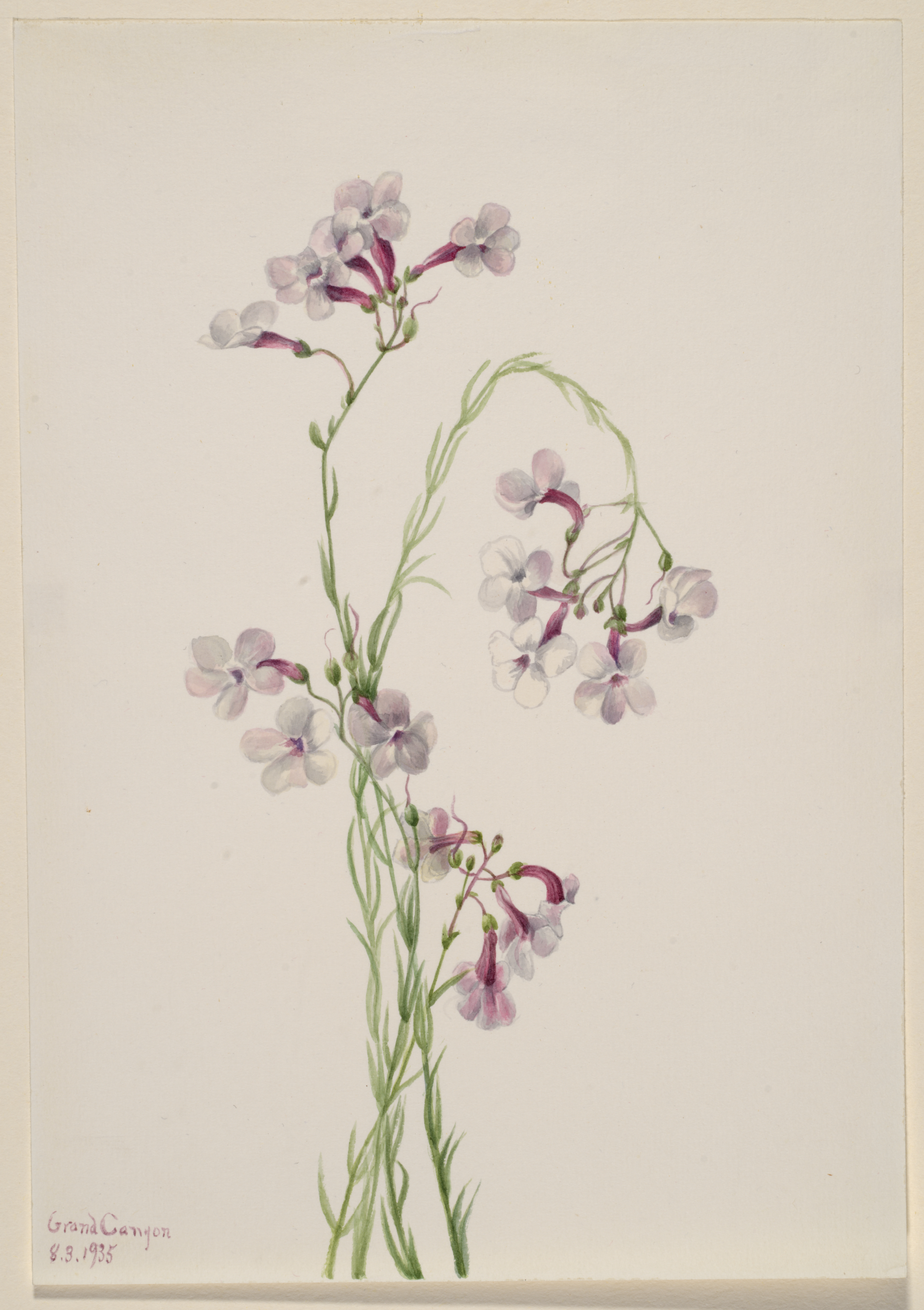
Penstemon ambiguus watercolor by Mary Vaux Walcott, from Smithsonian American Art Museum

Penstemon ambiguus was named and described by the botanist John Torrey in 1827 from a type specimen collected by Edwin P. James. James was the botanist in the 1820 expedition commanded by Major Stephen H. Long exploring a portion of the Louisiana Purchase by the United States government. The closest relative of the species is Penstemon thurberi. It is unusual enough in appearance that the botanist Edward Lee Greene proposed placing it in a monotypic genus named Leiostemon in 1906.

Penstemon ambiguus is the accepted scientific name according to Plants of the World Online (POWO) and World Flora Online (WFO).

=== Varieties and forms ===
Penstemon ambiguus has two varieties according to POWO and WFO.

==== Penstemon ambiguus var. ambiguus ====
This is the autonymic subspecies. It has one heterotypic synonym, Penstemon ambiguus var. foliosus, described by George Bentham in 1846. It differs by having rough stems near the base and always having rough leaf edges. It is the more northeasterly variety, growing in the southern shortgrass prairie.

==== Penstemon ambiguus var. laevissimus ====
This variety was initially described and named by David D. Keck, a noted expert on penstemons, as a subspecies in 1939. However, it was reclassified as a variety by Noel Herman Holmgren in 1979. It differs from the autonym in having a smooth base to the stem and sometimes having smooth edges to its leaves. It is the more southwesterly variety.

=== Names ===
The species name, ambiguus, is Botanical Latin meaning "uncertain". This may be a reference to the appearance of the plant being dissimilar to typical penstemon species. Penstemon ambiguus is most often known by the common name sand penstemon, though occasionally other species such as Penstemon acuminatus are known as sand penstemon. The name bush penstemon is used by the NRCS for Penstemon fruticosus, but it is frequently applied to Penstemon ambiguus. See also: Bush penstemon (disambiguation) It is also called moth penstemon, pink plains penstemon, phlox penstemon, phlox-flowered penstemon, and gilia penstemon. The NRCS and other botanical sources use the similar common name of gilia beardtongue. The name cow tobacco is of unknown origin with author Robert Nold wryly noting, "not known to be smoked by cows, as far as I know".

== Habitat and distribution ==
Penstemon ambiguus var. ambiguus grows in dunes, sandy areas of the plains, and sandsage shrublands. It is recorded by POWO and the USDA Natural Resources Conservation Service PLANTS database (PLANTS) as growing from eastern Colorado and western Kansas south to the Oklahoma panhandle, in two counties of New Mexico, and Texas. Though POWO additionally reports it growing in Nebraska. In southeastern Colorado, they are very often found in sandy washes and ephemeral streams draining the Palmer Divide.

Penstemon ambiguus var. laevissimus also grows in sandy soils with creosote bush, blackbrush, sagebrush shrublands, and in juniper woodlands. It is recorded by POWO and PLANTS as growing in Nevada, Utah, Arizona, New Mexico, and Texas. However, PLANTS also records it as growing in Colorado and Wyoming, in disagreement with both POWO and the Flora of North America. POWO, which has a wider coverage, also records it as growing in the Mexican state of Chihuahua.

== Ecology ==
The primary pollinators of Penstemon ambiguus are small pollen-collecting bees, although they are also frequently used as landing platforms by flies in genus Oligodranes. Only pollen-collecting bees are attracted to their flowers due to a lack of nectar rewards in the blooms of P. ambiguus.

== Cultivation ==
Because of the showy nature of its upwards facing blossoms and long-lived nature, many gardeners regard bush penstemons as one of the best penstemons to grow in gardens.

In hot, dry environments with well draining soil bush penstemon are recommended, but are difficult to grow in other conditions. In areas warmer than -4 °C (USDA hardiness zone 9 and above) the plants will largely stay green and may bloom all winter. Plants grow larger and more robustly in sandy soils and substantially smaller in heavier soils. In colder areas, bush penstemons often die back nearly to ground level, but they are hardy to about -23 °C to -17 °C (USDA hardiness zone 6). Unlike the seeds of many colder climate penstemons, the bush penstemon has seeds that do not exhibit any significant decrease in germination when directly planted at 21 °C (70 °F). They also have no change in germination by being held at 4.5 °C (40.1 °F) for three months.

== See also ==
List of Penstemon species
