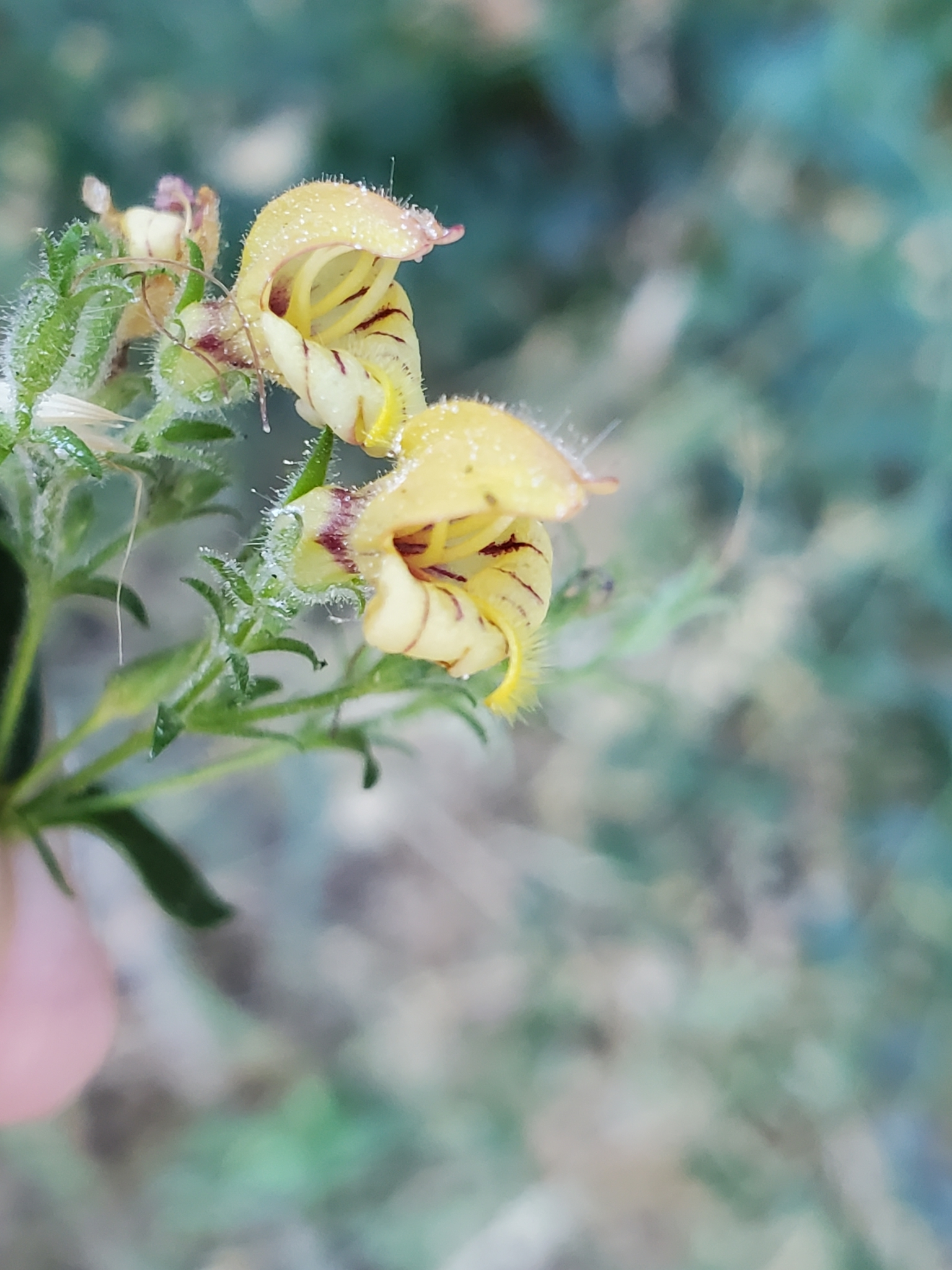

Scientific classification
- Kingdom: Plantae
- Clade: Tracheophytes
- Clade: Angiosperms
- Clade: Eudicots
- Clade: Asterids
- Order: Lamiales
- Family: Plantaginaceae
- Genus: Keckiella
- Species: K. lemmonii

Binomial name
- Keckiella lemmonii (Gray) Straw

= Keckiella lemmonii =

Species of plant

Keckiella lemmonii (formerly Penstemon lemmonii) is a species of flowering plant in the plantain family known by the common name Lemmon's keckiella.

It is native to Oregon and northern California, where it grows in the coniferous forests and chaparral of coastal and inland mountain ranges. Its range may extend just into Nevada in the High Sierra.

== Description ==
Keckiella lemmonii is a small shrub with long, narrow, mostly unbranched stems reaching maximum heights near 1.5 meters.

Oval-shaped, slightly toothed green leaves are arranged oppositely along the stems. Each leaf is up to about 6 centimeters long.

The flower is dull purple and streaked with purple-brown. Pointed lobes curl away from the mouth of the flower, revealing a hairy yellow sterile stamen known as a staminode. The flower is up to 2 centimeters in length.
