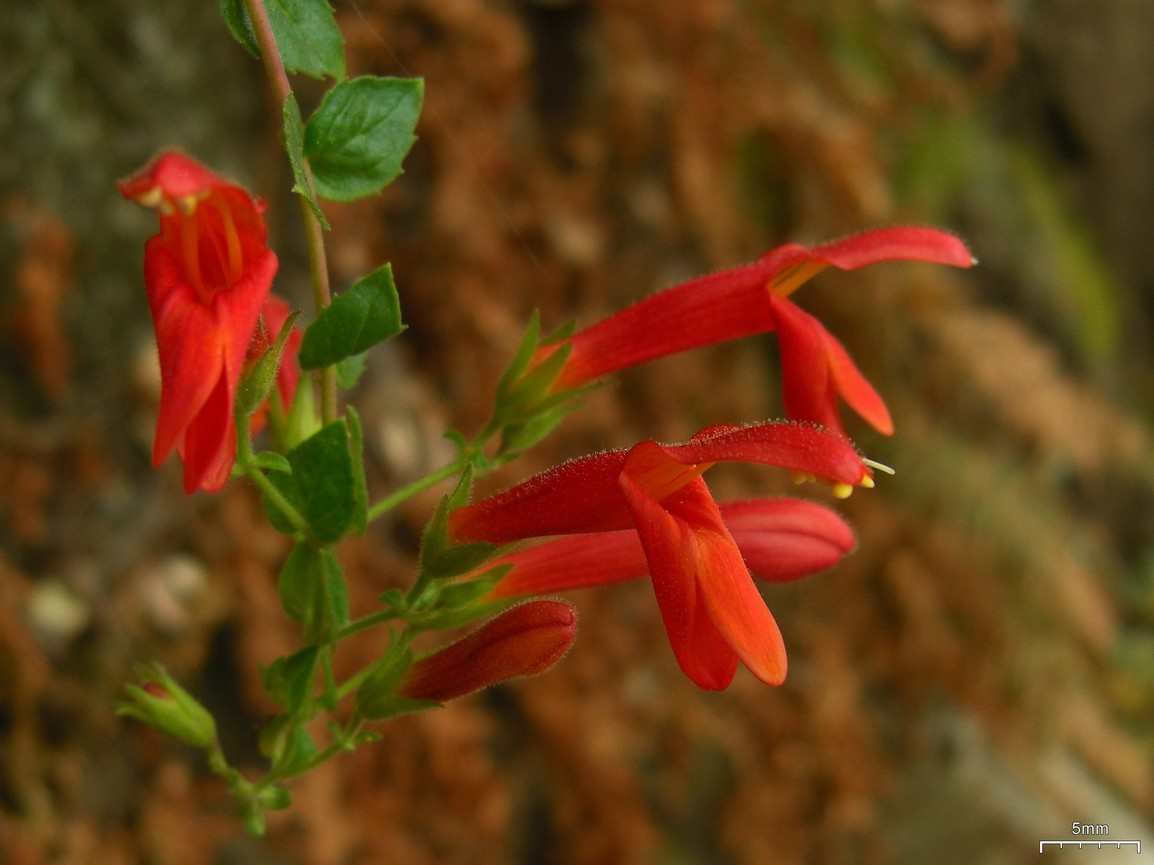

Conservation status
- Secure (NatureServe)

Scientific classification
- Kingdom: Plantae
- Clade: Tracheophytes
- Clade: Angiosperms
- Clade: Eudicots
- Clade: Asterids
- Order: Lamiales
- Family: Plantaginaceae
- Genus: Keckiella
- Species: K. cordifolia

Binomial name
- Keckiella cordifolia (Benth.) Straw

= Keckiella cordifolia =

Species of plant

Keckiella cordifolia (formerly Penstemon cordifolius) is a species of flowering shrub in the plantain family known by the common name heartleaf keckiella. It is native to the coast and coastal mountains of southern California and northern Baja California, and it is a resident of chaparral and coastal woodland plant communities.

This is a spreading shrub reaching maximum heights in excess of two meters. Its shiny green leaves are oval to heart-shaped, pointed, and edged with small teeth. They are 2 to 6 centimeters long and arranged oppositely on the branches. The shrub produces glandular, hairy inflorescences of many flowers each. The flower is somewhat tubular with a wide open mouth. It is fuzzy on the external surface and any shade of pale orange to deep scarlet. It is up to 3 centimeters long and 4 wide at the mouth, which has three flat lower lobes and two joined upper lobes. Inside the mouth are long filamentous stamens and a flat, hairy, yellow sterile stamen called a staminode.
