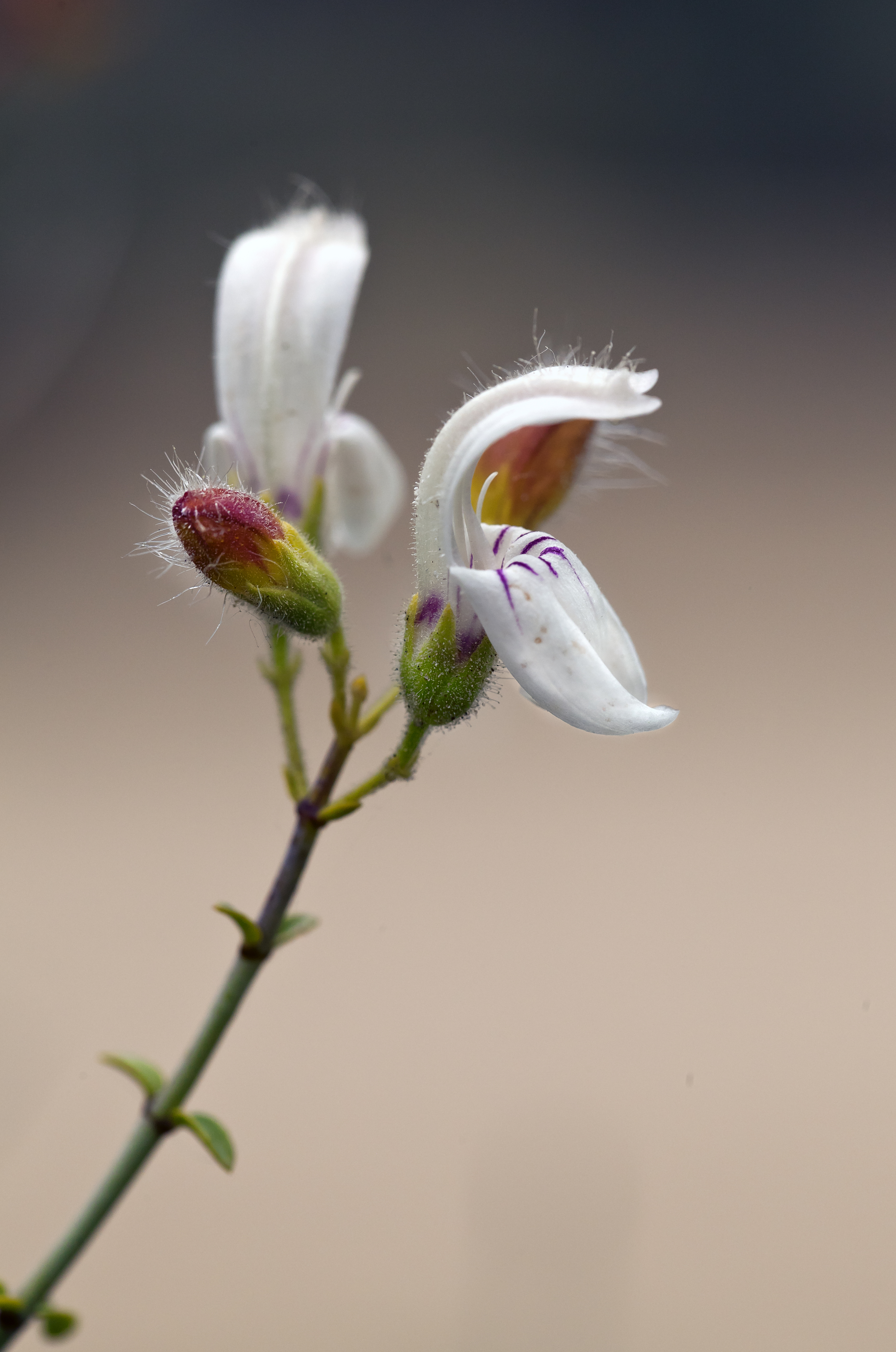
- var. breviflora

Conservation status
- Secure (NatureServe)

Scientific classification
- Kingdom: Plantae
- Clade: Embryophytes
- Clade: Tracheophytes
- Clade: Spermatophytes
- Clade: Angiosperms
- Clade: Eudicots
- Clade: Asterids
- Order: Lamiales
- Family: Plantaginaceae
- Genus: Keckiella
- Species: K. breviflora

Binomial name
- Keckiella breviflora (Lindl.) Straw

Synonyms
- Keckia breviflora; Penstemon breviflorus; Penstemon canosobarbatus; Penstemon carinatus

= Keckiella breviflora =

Plant species in the veronica family

Keckiella breviflora (formerly Penstemon breviflorus) is a species of flowering shrub in the veronica family known by the common name bush beardtongue.

It is native to many of the western Transverse Ranges, Inner California Coast Ranges and the Sierra Nevada in California, and its range extends just into Nevada.

== Description ==
Keckiella breviflora is a branching, bushy shrub with many thin stems, approaching a maximum height near two meters.

Its shiny green leaves are arranged oppositely on the branches, and each is one to four centimeters long, generally lance-shaped and finely serrated or smooth along the edges.

The shrub produces tall inflorescences which are loose, glandular spikes of flowers. Each flower is one to two centimeters wide with five pale pink or pinkish-streaked white lobes whose external surfaces have long, shiny hairs. The three lower lobes curl outward from the mouth and under, and the two upper lobes are joined into a lip that curves forward over the mouth. Within the mouth are long stamen filaments bearing anthers, and a flat, hairless, sterile stamen called a staminode.

== Taxonomy ==
The botanist John Lindley published the description of a new species in the genus Penstemon in 1837 which he named Penstemon breviflorus. He described the species using a specimen he grew from seeds he took from a specimen collected by David Douglas in the Santa Lucia Range in modern day Monterey County. Lindley's classification remained in place for more than a century until the 1967 creation of the new genus Keckiella by Richard Myron Straw, where he placed the species with the name Keckiella breviflora. Together with its genus it is classified as part of the Plantaginaceae family and has two accepted varieties.

- Keckiella breviflora var. breviflora
- Keckiella breviflora var. glabrisepala

Between the species and its two varieties it has ten synonyms, including four species names.

Table of Synonyms
Name	Year	Rank	Synonym of:	Notes
Keckia breviflora (Lindl.) Straw	1966	species	K. breviflora	≡ hom.
Keckia breviflora var. glabrisepala (D.D.Keck) Straw	1966	variety	var. glabrisepala	= het.
Keckiella breviflora subsp. glabrisepala (D.D.Keck) Straw	1967	subspecies	var. glabrisepala	= het.
Penstemon breviflorus Lindl.	1837	species	K. breviflora	≡ hom.
Penstemon breviflorus var. canosobarbatus Schelle	1903	variety	var. breviflora	= het.
Penstemon breviflorus var. carinatus (Kellogg) Schelle	1903	variety	var. breviflora	= het.
Penstemon breviflorus subsp. glabrisepalus D.D.Keck	1936	subspecies	var. glabrisepala	= het.
Penstemon breviflorus subsp. typicus D.D.Keck	1936	subspecies	K. breviflora	≡ hom., not validly publ.
Penstemon canosobarbatus Kellogg	1860	species	var. breviflora	= het.
Penstemon carinatus Kellogg	1855	species	var. breviflora	= het.
Notes: ≡ homotypic synonym ; = heterotypic synonym

=== Names ===
Keckiella breviflora is known by the common names gaping penstemon, small-flowered penstemon, and gaping beardtongue.

== Range ==
The majority of the gaping penstemon's range is in northern and central California, but it extends into the westernmost portions of Nevada. In California it grows in mountainous areas including the western Transverse Ranges, the southern Coast Ranges, and the Sierra Nevadas from the foothills to high ranges.
