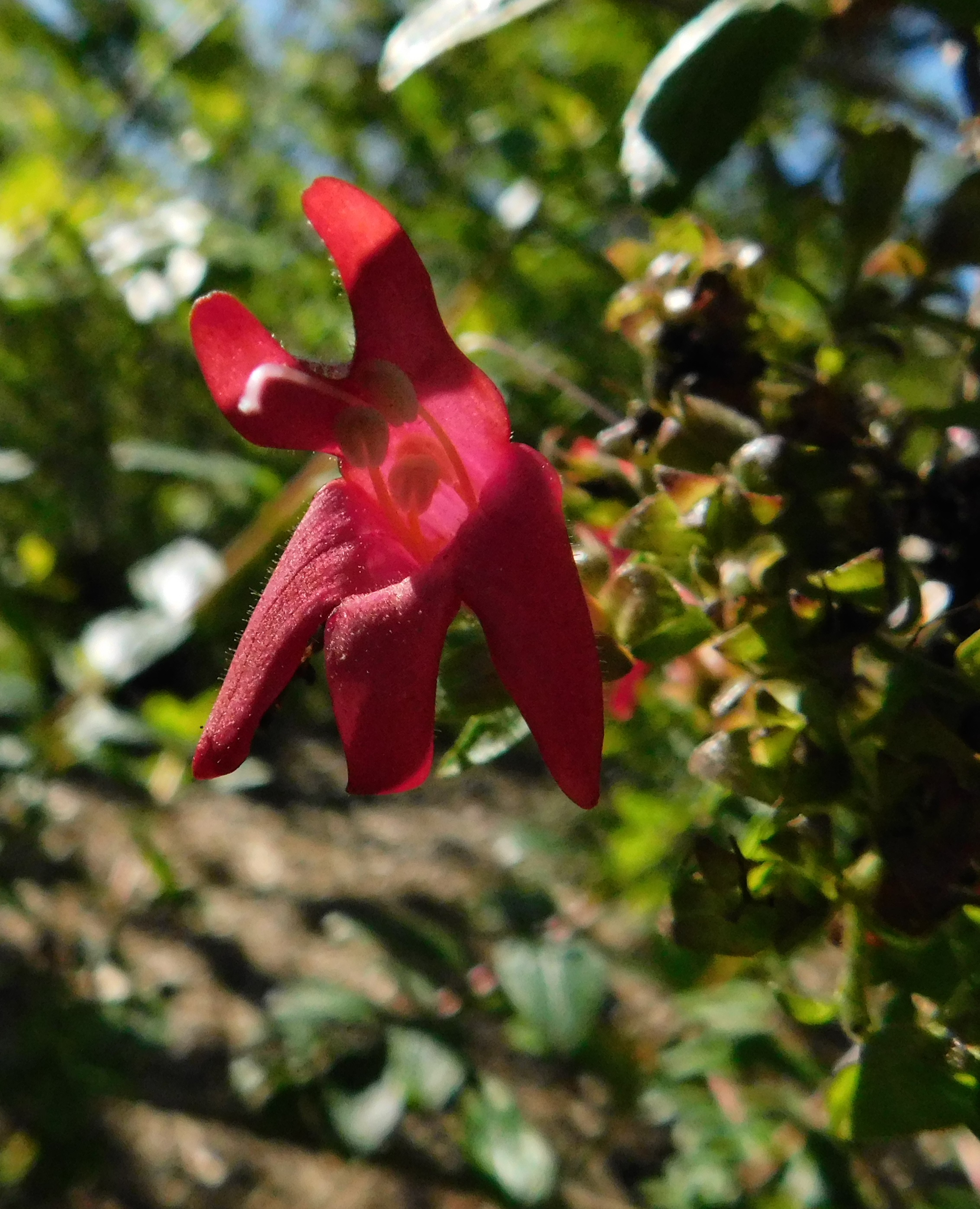

Conservation status
- Apparently Secure (NatureServe)

Scientific classification
- Kingdom: Plantae
- Clade: Tracheophytes
- Clade: Angiosperms
- Clade: Eudicots
- Clade: Asterids
- Order: Lamiales
- Family: Plantaginaceae
- Genus: Keckiella
- Species: K. corymbosa

Binomial name
- Keckiella corymbosa (Benth. ex A.DC. ) Straw

= Keckiella corymbosa =

Species of plant

Keckiella corymbosa (formerly Penstemon corymbosus) is a species of flowering shrub in the plantain family known by the common names redwood keckiella, red beardtongue, and red shrubby penstemon.

It is endemic to California, where it grows in the forests and chaparral of the central and northern regions of the state.

== Description ==
Keckiella corymbosa is a narrow, erect keckiella, reaching up to about half a meter tall and less than a meter in width. Its spreading branches have oppositely-arranged pairs of narrowly oval-shaped leaves one to three centimeters long and with smooth or vaguely toothed edges.

The plant produces inflorescences on hairy pedicels with many flowers. Each flower is tubular opening into a wide mouth with three narrow, pointed lower lobes and two upper lobes joined into a straight flap or curving lip. The flower is up to 4 centimeters wide and 3 long, and is bright red to orange red or deep pink. Inside the mouth are long filamentous stamens and one flat, yellow-hairy sterile stamen called a staminode.
