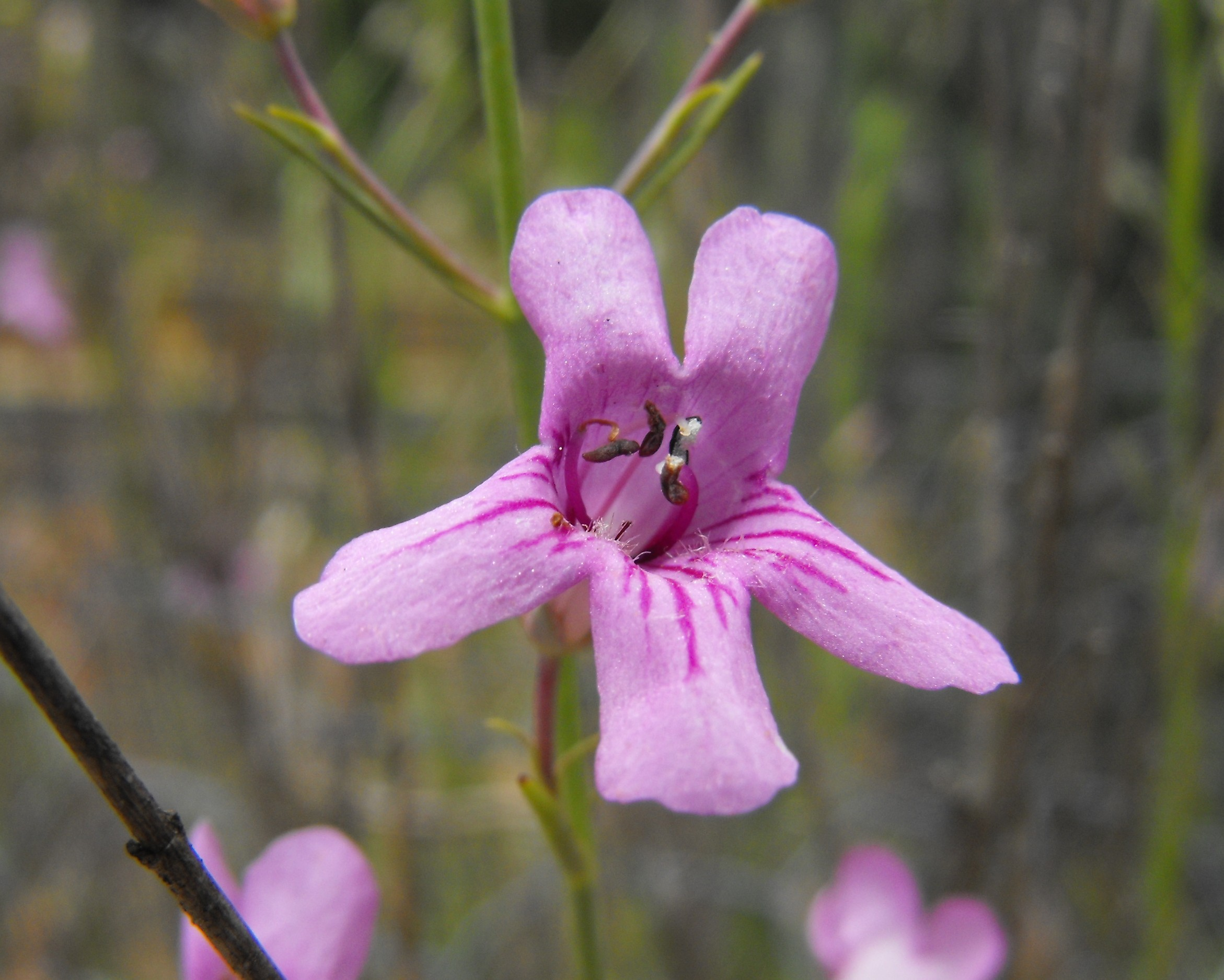

Conservation status
- Secure (NatureServe)

Scientific classification
- Kingdom: Plantae
- Clade: Tracheophytes
- Clade: Angiosperms
- Clade: Eudicots
- Clade: Asterids
- Order: Lamiales
- Family: Plantaginaceae
- Genus: Penstemon
- Species: P. thurberi

Binomial name
- Penstemon thurberi Torr.

= Penstemon thurberi =

Species of flowering plant

Penstemon thurberi is a species of penstemon known by the common names Thurber's beardtongue and Thurber's penstemon. It is native to the southwestern United States and northern Mexico, where it grows in many types of desert and mountain habitat, including sandy flats, chaparral, scrub, and woodlands. It is a shrub growing erect and somewhat rounded in form, reaching around 80 centimeters in maximum height. Many slender stems emerge from its woody base. The leaves are narrow, linear in shape, with edges rolled upward nearly into a tube. The long inflorescence bears funnel-shaped lavender, pink, or pale blue-purple flowers up to 1.5 centimeters in length.

== Range and habitat ==
In the United states it is native to Arizona, California, New Mexico, Nevada, and Texas. While in Mexico it grows in just two widely separated states, Baja California and Coahuila. In Baja California they are found in Sierra de Juárez northwards to Sierra de San Pedro Mártir, across the border to the Little San Bernardino Mountains of California and Providence Mountains.

The grow on rocky hillsides and silty flats.
