= Lepidostemon =

Scientific classification
- Kingdom: Plantae
- Clade: Tracheophytes
- Clade: Angiosperms
- Clade: Eudicots
- Clade: Rosids
- Order: Brassicales
- Family: Brassicaceae
- Genus: Lepidostemon; Hook.f. & Thomson

Genus of plants

Lepidostemon is a genus of flowering plants belonging to the family Brassicaceae.

Its native range is Himalaya to Tibet.

Species:

- Lepidostemon everestianus Al-Shehbaz
- Lepidostemon glaricola (H.Hara) Al-Shehbaz
- Lepidostemon gouldii Al-Shehbaz
- Lepidostemon pedunculosus Hook.f. & Thomson
- Lepidostemon rosularis (K.C.Kuan & C.H.An) Al-Shehbaz
- Lepidostemon williamsii (H.Hara) Al-Shehbaz
