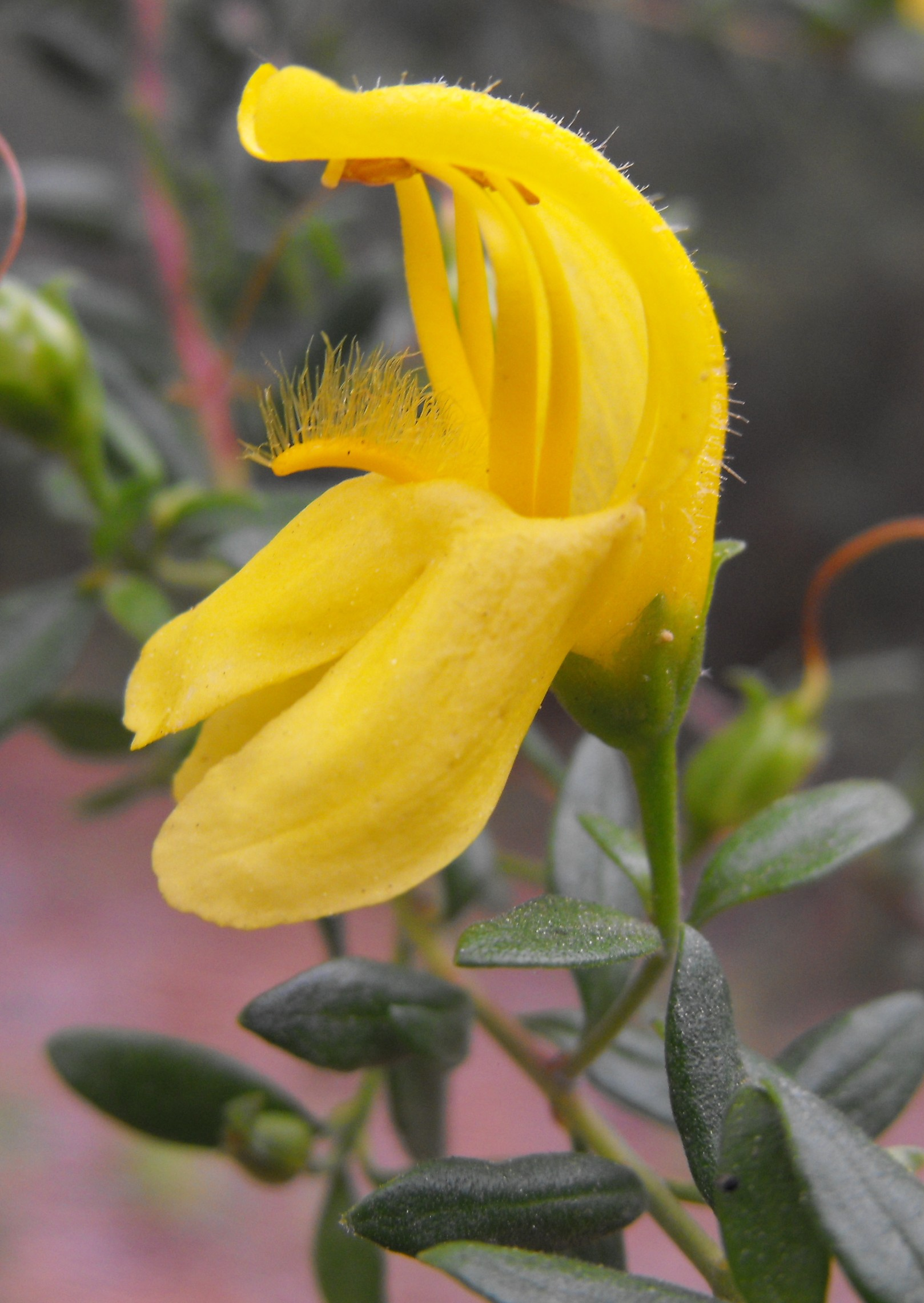

Conservation status
- Secure (NatureServe)

Scientific classification
- Kingdom: Plantae
- Clade: Embryophytes
- Clade: Tracheophytes
- Clade: Spermatophytes
- Clade: Angiosperms
- Clade: Eudicots
- Clade: Asterids
- Order: Lamiales
- Family: Plantaginaceae
- Genus: Keckiella
- Species: K. antirrhinoides

Binomial name
- Keckiella antirrhinoides (Benth.) Straw

Varieties
- K. a. var. antirrhinoides; K. a. var. microphylla

Synonyms
- Keckia antirrhinoides; Lepidostemon penstemonoides; Penstemon antirrhinoides; Penstemon lobbii; Penstemon microphyllus; Penstemon plummerae

= Keckiella antirrhinoides =

Plant species in the veronica family

Keckiella antirrhinoides (formerly Penstemon antirrhinoides) is a species of flowering shrub in the plantain family known by the common names snapdragon penstemon and chaparral beardtongue.

It is native to the Mojave Desert and Sonoran Deserts of California, Arizona, and northern Baja California. It is also found in the chaparral—Colorado Desert ecotone of the Peninsular Ranges.

== Description ==
Keckiella antirrhinoides is desert shrub that grows one half to two and a half meters tall, with spreading branches.

The oppositely-arranged leaves are up to 2 centimeters long and are lance-shaped or narrow ovals. They are deciduous during dry periods.

The plant produces branchlike inflorescences which bear snapdragon-like flowers. Each hairy, glandular flower is about 2 centimeters wide, with three lower lobes which lie flat or curve down and two upper lobes which join to form a curved lip. Inside the flower are shiny filamentous stamens holding anthers and a flat, densely hairy sterile stamen called a staminode. The flowers are light yellow and dry to nearly black.

== Taxonomy ==
The botanist George Bentham described a new species in the Penstemon genus in 1846, which he named Penstemon antirrhinoides. In 1967 Richard Myron Straw moved it to the new genus Keckiella giving the species its accepted name Keckiella antirrhinoides. Together with its genus it is classified in the Plantaginaceae family and it has two accepted varieties.

- Keckiella antirrhinoides var. antirrhinoides – Baja California, Sonora, and southern California
- Keckiella antirrhinoides var. microphylla – Baja California, California, Nevada, and Arizona

Keckiella antirrhinoides has ten synonyms of the species or its two varieties.

Table of Synonyms
Name	Year	Rank	Synonym of:	Notes
Keckia antirrhinoides (Benth.) Straw	1966	species	K. antirrhinoides	≡ hom.
Keckia antirrhinoides var. microphylla (A.Gray) Straw	1966	variety	var. microphylla	≡ hom.
Keckiella antirrhinoides subsp. microphylla (A.Gray) Straw	1967	subspecies	var. microphylla	≡ hom.
Lepidostemon penstemonoides Lem.	1862	species	var. antirrhinoides	= het.
Penstemon antirrhinoides Benth.	1846	species	K. antirrhinoides	≡ hom.
Penstemon antirrhinoides subsp. microphyllus (A.Gray) D.D.Keck	1951	subspecies	var. microphylla	≡ hom.
Penstemon antirrhinoides var. microphyllus (A.Gray) Munz & I.M.Johnst.	1922	variety	var. microphylla	≡ hom.
Penstemon lobbii Lem.	1862	species	var. antirrhinoides	= het.
Penstemon microphyllus A.Gray	1857	species	var. microphylla	≡ hom.
Penstemon plummerae Abrams	1906	species	var. antirrhinoides	= het.
Notes: ≡ homotypic synonym; = heterotypic synonym

== Range ==
Snapdragon penstemons are native to northwestern Mexico and the southwestern United States. In Mexico it is grows in both Baja California and in Sonora. In the US it is found in nine counties in the western two-thirds of Arizona, but just Clark County at the southern tip of Nevada.In California it is known from San Bernardino, Riverside, Los Angeles, Orange, and San Diego counties in southern California.
