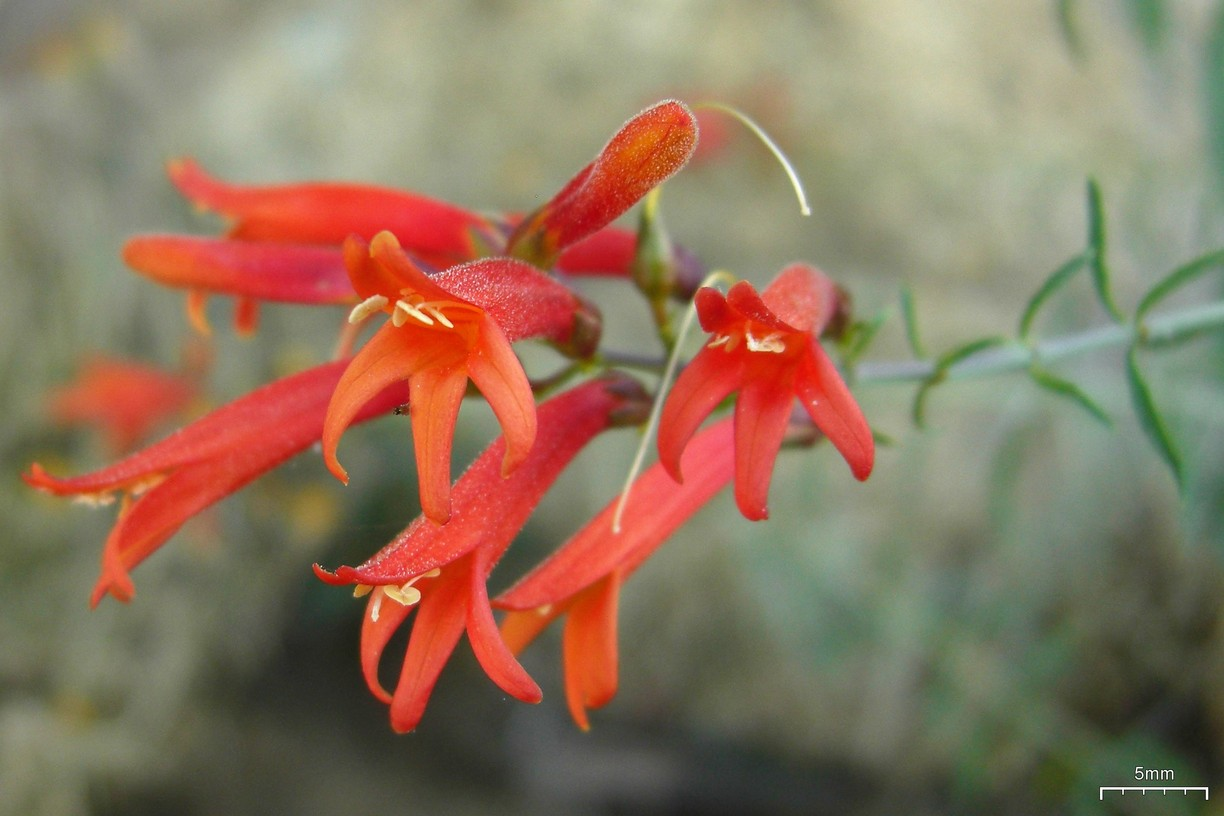

Conservation status
- Secure (NatureServe)

Scientific classification
- Kingdom: Plantae
- Clade: Tracheophytes
- Clade: Angiosperms
- Clade: Eudicots
- Clade: Asterids
- Order: Lamiales
- Family: Plantaginaceae
- Genus: Keckiella
- Species: K. ternata

Binomial name
- Keckiella ternata (Torr. ex A.Gray) Straw

Varieties
- K. t. var. septentrionalis; K. t. var. ternata

Synonyms
- Keckia ternata; Penstemon ternatus

= Keckiella ternata =

Plant species in the veronica family

Keckiella ternata is a species of flowering plant in the plantain family known by the common name scarlet keckiella.

It is native to the mountains of southern California and Baja California, where it grows in several local habitat types, including chaparral and woodland.

== Description ==
Keckiella ternata is a shrub often exceeding two meters in height and spreading slightly with wand-like, waxy branches.

The branches bear whorls of three leaves each, or oppositely arranged pairs of leaves. Each toothed, curving leaf is tapered at the base and pointed at the tip, oblong to lance-shaped, and up to 6 centimeters long.

The inflorescence is an array of solid red tubular flowers up to 3 centimeters long. The hairy staminode is visible in the mouth of the flower.

== Taxonomy ==
Keckiella ternata was scientifically described in 1859 by Asa Gray, who credited work by John Torrey, and named Penstemon ternatus. It was moved to the genus Keckiella in 1967 by Richard Myron Straw. Together with its genus it is classified in the Plantaginaceae family and it has two accepted varieties.

- Keckiella ternata var. septentrionalis – Native to southern and central California
- Keckiella ternata var. ternata – Native to southern California and Baja California

It has seven homotypic synonyms of the species and one of its varieties.

Table of Synonyms
Name	Year	Rank	Synonym of:	Notes
Keckia ternata (Torr. ex A.Gray) Straw	1966	species	E. ternata	
Keckia ternata var. septentrionalis (Munz & I.M.Johnst.) Straw	1966	variety	var. septentrionalis	
Keckiella ternata subsp. septentrionalis (Munz & I.M.Johnst.) Straw	1967	subspecies	var. septentrionalis	
Penstemon ternatus Torr. ex A.Gray	1859	species	E. ternata	
Penstemon ternatus subsp. septentrionalis (Munz & I.M.Johnst.) D.D.Keck	1936	subspecies	var. septentrionalis	
Penstemon ternatus var. septentrionalis Munz & I.M.Johnst.	1924	variety	var. septentrionalis	
Penstemon ternatus subsp. typicus D.D.Keck	1936	subspecies	E. ternata	not validly publ.

=== Names ===
Keckiella ternata is known by the common names scarlet keckiella, blue-stem beardtongue, and bush penstemon.
