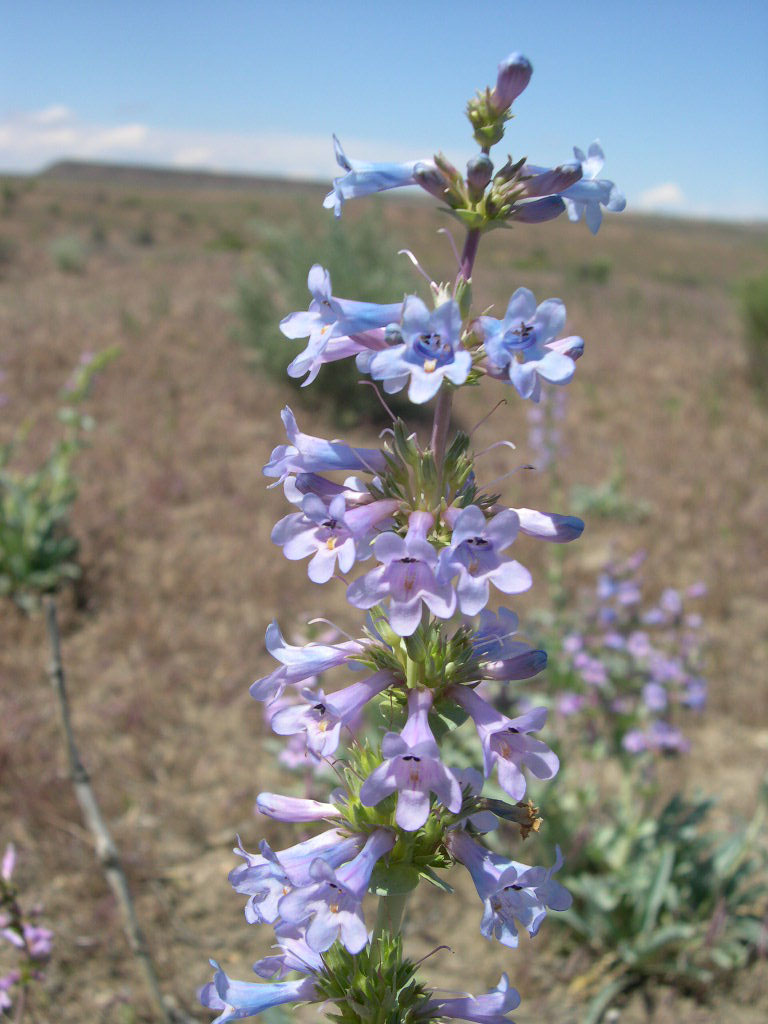

Conservation status
- Secure (NatureServe)

Scientific classification
- Kingdom: Plantae
- Clade: Tracheophytes
- Clade: Angiosperms
- Clade: Eudicots
- Clade: Asterids
- Order: Lamiales
- Family: Plantaginaceae
- Genus: Penstemon
- Species: P. acuminatus

Binomial name
- Penstemon acuminatus Douglas ex Lindl.

Varieties
- Penstemon acuminatus var. acuminatus; Penstemon acuminatus var. latibracteatus N.H.Holmgren

Synonyms
- Penstemon acuminatus var. fendleri M.E.Jones

= Penstemon acuminatus =

Plant species in the plantain family

Penstemon acuminatus is a species of flowering plant in the plantain family known by the common names sharpleaf penstemon and sand-dune penstemon. It is native to the dry interior of the northwestern United States.

== Description ==
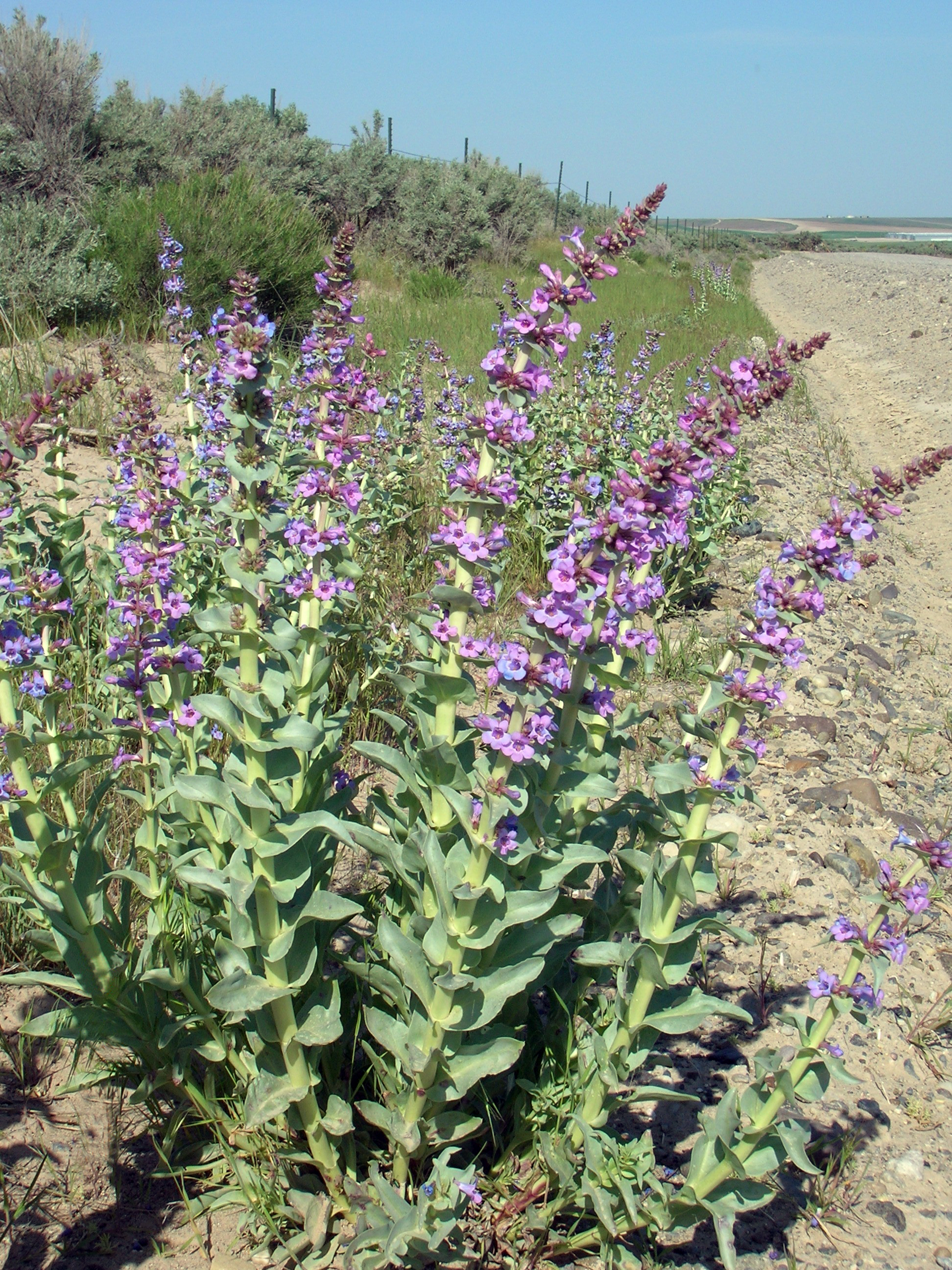

Penstemon acuminatus is a short lived perennial plant that is herbaceous, lacking woody stems and may have one or more flowering stems on mature plants. Its flowering stems grow straight upwards or out from the base for a short distance before growing upwards, usually reaching 20 to 60 centimeters (8 to 24 in) in height, but occasionally as short as 9 cm (4 in).

The cauline and basal leaves are usually 3–9.5 centimeters long, but may occasionally be as short as 1.4 cm. They may clasp the stem at their bases. The fleshy leaves and the stem may be waxy in texture. Arranged in whorls near the ends of the stems, the tubular blue, purple, or violet flowers are up to 2 cm long. They have wide throats and flaring corollas. The staminode has a beard of yellow hairs.

This species is used for revegetation of wildlife habitat, for landscaping and gardens, and for seeding roadsides.

== Taxonomy ==
Penstemon acuminatus was scientifically described by the botanist John Lindley in 1829, but he attributed this description to David Douglas. It has two accepted varieties.

=== Penstemon acuminatus var. acuminatus ===
The autonymic variety is the one first described as a species. One additional variety of Penstemon acuminatus was described in 1908 by Marcus E. Jones, but this is not recognized as valid and considered to be a botanical synonym. It grows in the state of Washington and Oregon east of the Cascade Range.

=== Penstemon acuminatus var. latibracteatus ===
This variety was described by Noel Herman Holmgren in 1979 with its present name. It grows east of the Cascades in Oregon, throughout much of Nevada, and in the southern part of Idaho.

=== Names ===
In English it is known by the common name sharpleaf penstemon. It is alternately known as the sand penstemon or sand-dune penstemon.

== Range and habitat ==
The sharpleaf penstemon grows in the interior of four western states. It native range extends over the eastern, dry portions of Oregon and Washington states from as far north as Douglas County, Washington. To the east it reaches into southern Idaho as far east as Lemhi County and Oneida County. In Nevada it ranges through much of the state as far south as Nye County. It may also grow in a small portion of northern Utah.

This plant grows in sandy habitat types, such as dunes.

== See also ==
List of Penstemon species
