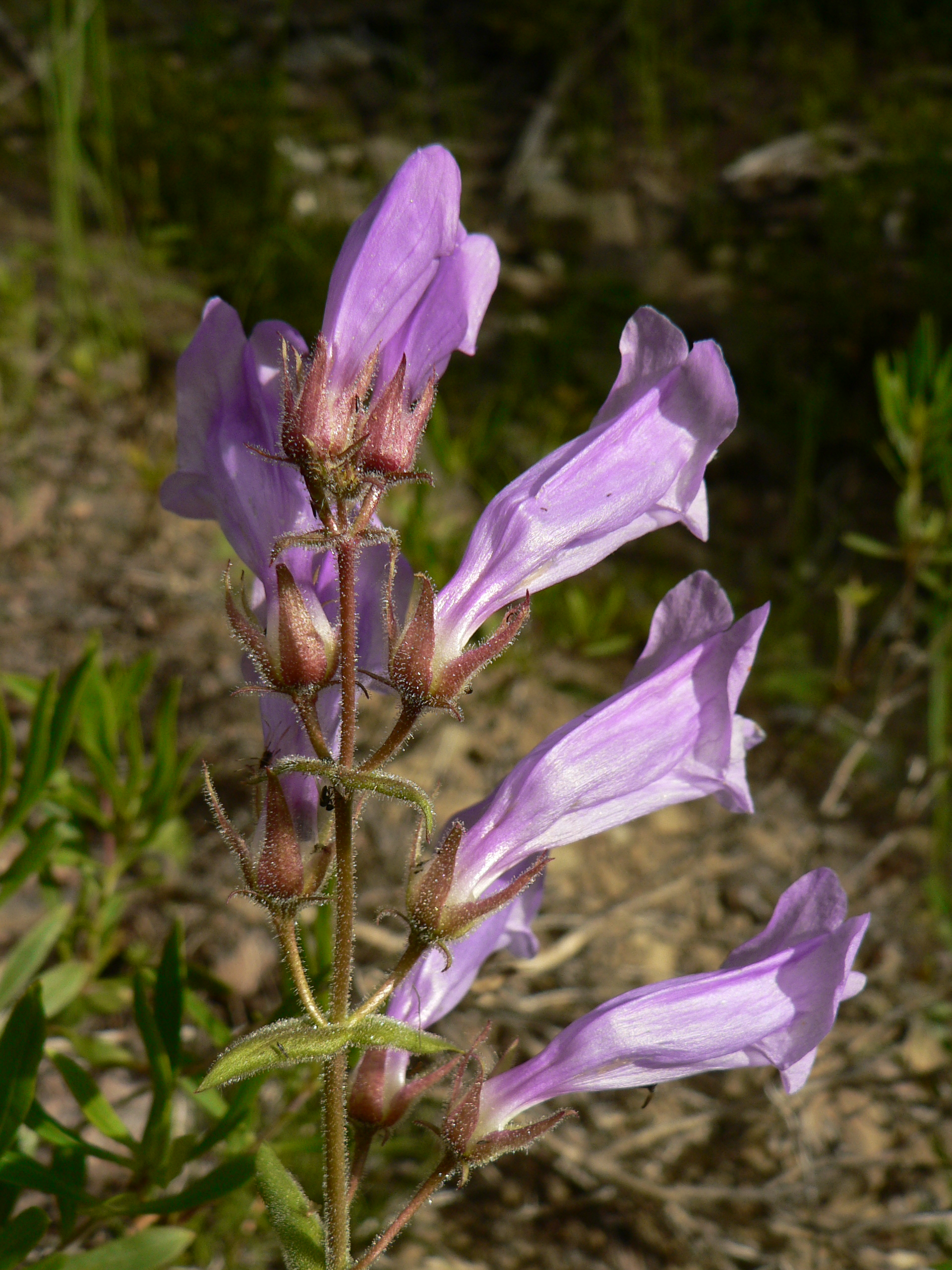

Conservation status
- Secure (NatureServe)

Scientific classification
- Kingdom: Plantae
- Clade: Tracheophytes
- Clade: Angiosperms
- Clade: Eudicots
- Clade: Asterids
- Order: Lamiales
- Family: Plantaginaceae
- Genus: Penstemon
- Species: P. fruticosus

Binomial name
- Penstemon fruticosus (Pursh) Greene

Varieties
- P. fruticosus var. fruticosus; P. fruticosus var. scouleri; P. fruticosus var. serratus

= Penstemon fruticosus =

Plant species in the veronica family

Penstemon fruticosus, the bush penstemon or shrubby penstemon, is a species of penstemon native to the Pacific Northwest of North America.

== Description ==
Penstemon fruticosus is a semi-evergreen shrub or subshrub, a plant that is partly woody especially towards its base, that usually takes the form of a spreading tuft. Its stems may be 13 to 40 centimeters (5 to 16 in) tall. Usually several stems will grow directly upwards or outward a short distance before curving to grow upwards from a branched, woody caudex at the base of the plant. The stems may be glabrous or puberulent, hairless or covered in minute, stiff hairs.

Each stem will have two to six pairs of leaves attached on opposite sides with those towards the end clearly smaller than ones towards the base. The leaves are normally smooth and glossy and those on stems without flowers are usually better developed than ones on flowering stems. Leaf length ranges from 0.5 to 6 centimeters, though ordinarily less than 5 cm (2 in). Their width is 3 to 12 millimeters. They may be lanceolate, oblanceolate, or elliptic; shaped like a spear head, reversed, or with sides like two ellipses. The end of the leaf may be narrow or bluntly pointed, seldom the leaf vein extends out into an extended mucronate tip.

The inflorescences have few flowers all facing one direction away from the stem. Each flowering stem will have two to seven groups of flowers with a pair of cymes each with one flower. As the base of each group there will be a pair of lanceolate bracts, 4–16 mm long. The flowers have fused petals in a funnel shape 2.8–4.8 cm in length. The color of the flowers is variously described as pale lavender, pale blue-violet, blue-lavender, or light purplish. The outside of the flower is hairless, but the top interior of the tube is covered in white hairs. The staminode does not reach out of the flower opening and is sparsely to densely covered in yellow hairs.

== Taxonomy ==
The species was scientifically described and named Gerardia fruticosa in 1813 by the botanist Frederick Traugott Pursh. In 1892 it was moved to the current name of Penstemon fruticosus by Edward Lee Greene.

=== Varieties ===
Penstemon fruticosus has three accepted varieties:

==== Penstemon fruticosus var. fruticosus ====
This is the autonymic variety of the species. It is the most widespread of the three varieties.

==== Penstemon fruticosus var. scouleri ====
In 1829 David Douglas described a species he named Penstemon scouleri. It was reclassified as a variety of this species in 1959 by Arthur Cronquist.

==== Penstemon fruticosus var. serratus ====
The botanist David D. Keck described a subspecies he named Penstemon fruticosus subsp. serratus. It also was changed to be a variety by Cronquist in 1951.

=== Synonyms ===
It also has 17 synonyms of the species or one of its varieties.

Table of Synonyms
Name	Year	Rank	Synonym of:	Notes
Apentostera secundiflora Raf.	1837	species	var. fruticosus	= het.
Chelone scouleri Douglas ex Lindl.	1829	species	var. scouleri	= het. pro syn.
Dasanthera fruticosa (Pursh) Raf.	1837	species	P. fruticosus	≡ hom.
Gerardia fruticosa Pursh	1813	species	P. fruticosus	≡ hom.
Penstemon crassifolius Lindl.	1838	species	var. fruticosus	= het.
Penstemon fruticosus subsp. scouleri (Douglas) Pennell & D.D.Keck	1951	subspecies	var. scouleri	≡ hom.
Penstemon fruticosus subsp. serratus D.D.Keck	1951	subspecies	var. serratus	≡ hom.
Penstemon fruticosus var. crassifolius (Lindl.) Krautter	1908	variety	var. fruticosus	= het.
Penstemon lewisii Benth.	1846	species	var. fruticosus	= het.
Penstemon menziesii Hook.	1838	species	P. fruticosus	≡ hom. nom. superfl.
Penstemon menziesii var. crassifolius (Lindl.) Schelle	1903	variety	var. fruticosus	= het.
Penstemon menziesii var. lewisii (Benth.) A.Gray	1862	variety	var. fruticosus	= het.
Penstemon menziesii var. peduncularis (Nutt. ex Benth.) Schelle	1903	variety	var. fruticosus	= het.
Penstemon menziesii var. scouleri (Douglas) A.Gray	1862	variety	var. scouleri	≡ hom.
Penstemon menziesii f. scouleri (Douglas) Voss	1894	form	var. scouleri	≡ hom.
Penstemon peduncularis Nutt. ex Benth.	1846	species	var. fruticosus	= het.
Penstemon scouleri Douglas	1829	species	var. scouleri	≡ hom.
Notes: ≡ homotypic synonym; = heterotypic synonym

=== Names ===
In English it is known by the common names of shrubby penstemon or bush penstemon. It is also occasionally known as desert penstemon.

== Range and habitat ==
The species is native to the Pacific Northwest of North America from Oregon to British Columbia, and east to the Rocky Mountains of Wyoming, Montana, and Alberta. In Canada it grows in southwestern Alberta and the interior of British Columbia. In the Rocky Mountains it grows in Idaho and Montana, but only reaches as far south as Park County, Wyoming in the state's northwestern corner. In Washington and Oregon it is found in many areas from the eastern side to the Cascades. It grows at elevations of up to 3,000 meters (9,800 ft).

It grows on cliffs, rock outcrops, gravelly slopes, in forest openings, and along roadcuts. It is associated with sagebrush and with juniper woodlands.

=== Conservation ===
Shrubby penstemon was evaluated by NatureServe in 2016 and rated as secure (G5). They also rated it as secure (S5) in British Columbia and as apparently secure (S4) in Montana. In Alberta and Wyoming they rated it as vulnerable (S3), but have not evaluated it in Idaho, Washington, or Oregon.

== See also ==
- List of Penstemon species
