= Pseudocalpe =

Pseudocalpe is a moth genus which may refer to:

- Pseudocalpe Möschler, 1890, which is considered a synonym of Phyprosopus Grote, 1872 (Erebidae)
- Pseudocalpe Hampson, 1894, which is considered a synonym of:
  - Arcyophora Guenée, 1852 (Nolidae)
  - Setoctena Wallengren, 1863 (Nolidae)
