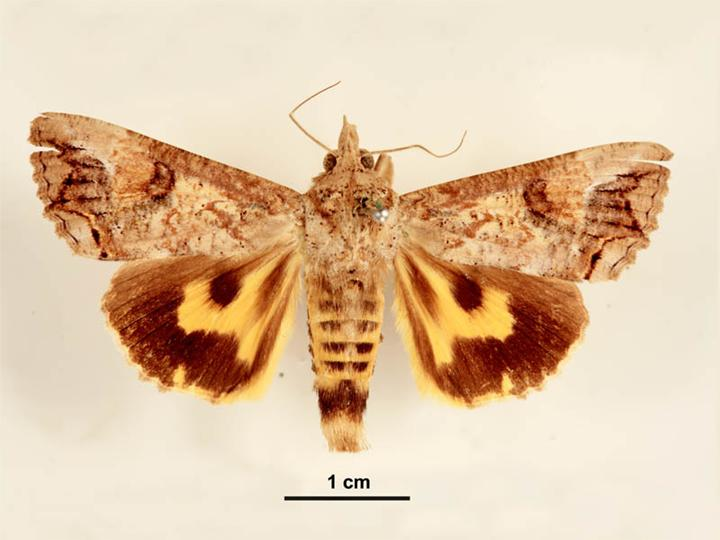
- Hypocala deflorata

Scientific classification
- Kingdom: Animalia
- Phylum: Arthropoda
- Class: Insecta
- Order: Lepidoptera
- Superfamily: Noctuoidea
- Family: Erebidae
- Subfamily: Hypocalinae; Guenée, 1852

= Hypocalinae =

Subfamily of moths

Hypocalinae is a subfamily of moths in the family Erebidae.

== Genera ==
- Aon Neumögen, 1892
- Goniapteryx Perty, 1833
- Hypocala Guenée, 1852
- Hypsoropha Hübner, 1818
- Psammathodoxa Dyar, 1921
