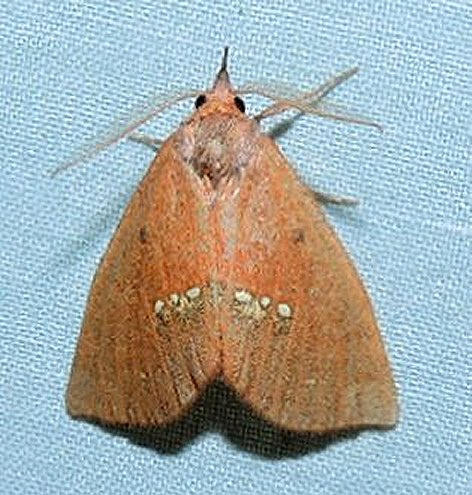

Scientific classification
- Domain: Eukaryota
- Kingdom: Animalia
- Phylum: Arthropoda
- Class: Insecta
- Order: Lepidoptera
- Superfamily: Noctuoidea
- Family: Erebidae
- Genus: Hypsoropha
- Species: H. monilis

Binomial name
- Hypsoropha monilis (Fabricius, 1777)

Synonyms
- Noctua monilis Fabricius, 1777

= Hypsoropha monilis =

Species of insect

Hypsoropha monilis, the large necklace moth, is a moth of the family Erebidae found in the southeastern United States. The species was first described by Johan Christian Fabricius in 1777.

== Description ==
=== Adults ===
Adult wings are brown with a postmedial band of white spots meeting at the inner margins, like a white necklace. The specific epithet monilis is a Latin word meaning necklace or collar, referring to this spot band. The species is similar in appearance to the smaller small necklace moth (Hypsoropha hormos), and the ranges of the two species broadly overlap.

=== Larvae ===
Caterpillars are mostly gray with yellow or green segmental rings and white spots on the abdominal segments. The head is yellow orange with two large, black spots, and the top of the thorax just behind the head is black.

== Range ==
The species' occurrence range extends from Texas and Kansas in the west to Florida and Maryland in the east.

== Life cycle ==
=== Adults ===
Adults have been reported from February to October, with most sightings from March to May.
