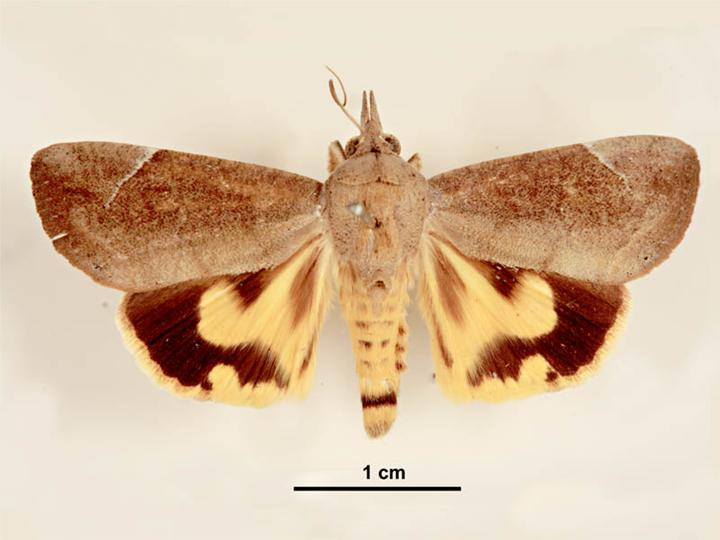
- Female
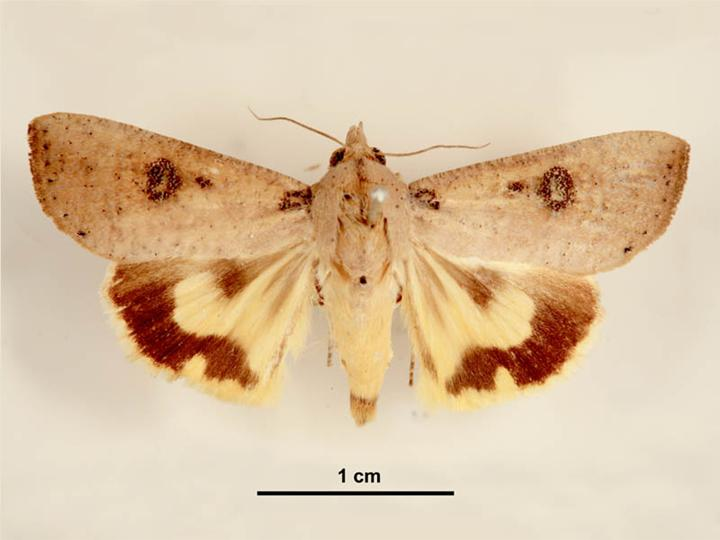
- Male

Scientific classification
- Kingdom: Animalia
- Phylum: Arthropoda
- Class: Insecta
- Order: Lepidoptera
- Superfamily: Noctuoidea
- Family: Erebidae
- Genus: Hypocala
- Species: H. guttiventris

Binomial name
- Hypocala guttiventris Walker, 1858

Synonyms
- Hypocala lativitta Walker, 1865; Hypocala tryphaenina Felder & Rogenhofer, 1874

= Hypocala guttiventris =

Species of moth

Hypocala guttiventris is a species of moth of the family Erebidae. It is found in Queensland and New South Wales.

The wingspan is about 30 mm.
