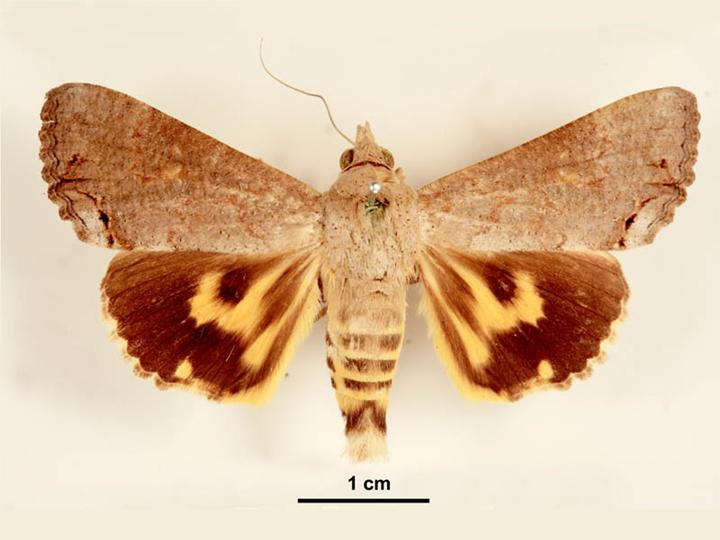
- Female
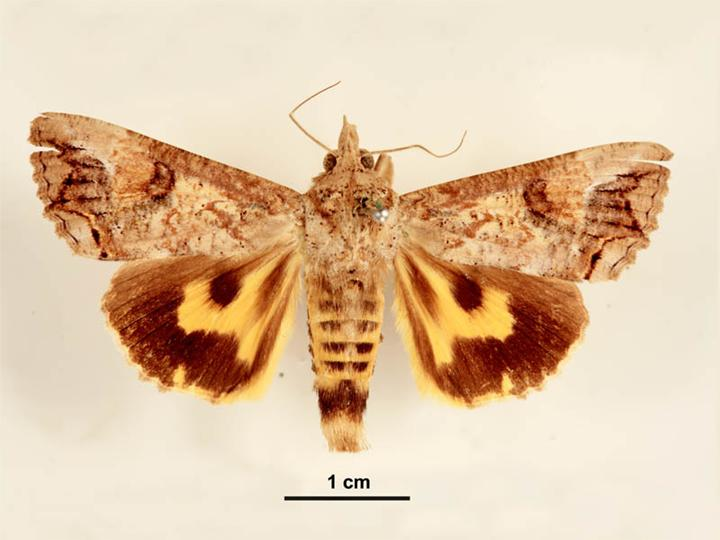
- Male

Scientific classification
- Kingdom: Animalia
- Phylum: Arthropoda
- Clade: Pancrustacea
- Class: Insecta
- Order: Lepidoptera
- Superfamily: Noctuoidea
- Family: Erebidae
- Genus: Hypocala
- Species: H. deflorata

Binomial name
- Hypocala deflorata (Fabricius, 1794)

Synonyms
- Hyblaea deflorata Fabricius, 1794; Hypocala moorei Butler, 1892; Hypocala australiae Butler, 1892

= Hypocala deflorata =

Species of moth

Hypocala deflorata is a moth of the family Erebidae. It was first described by Johan Christian Fabricius in 1794. It is widespread from India, Sri Lanka to Africa and to Australia and many Pacific islands. Records include China, Borneo, Queensland, Vanuatu, New Caledonia, Rotuma, Fiji, Samoa, Hawaii, Norfolk Island and New Zealand.

== Description ==
Full-grown larvae are about 45 mm.

The pupa is about 22 mm in length and is medium dark brown.

In the adult, the head, thorax and forewings are pale violaceous grey. Hindwings with large orange area. Marginal black area reduced and the two orange spots conjoined. Ventral side black on forewing reduced to two bars, and that on hindwing also much reduced.

== Ecology ==
The larvae feed on Diospyros pallens, Diospyros villosa, Diospyros dichrophylla, Diospyros lycioides, Maba sandwicensis, Royena and Sapota species.

== Subspecies ==
- Hypocala deflorata deflorata
- Hypocala deflorata australiae (Queensland, Vanuatu, New Caledonia, Rotuma, Fiji, Samoa, Norfolk Island, New Zealand)
