= Hypocala velans =

Scientific classification
- Kingdom: Animalia
- Phylum: Arthropoda
- Class: Insecta
- Order: Lepidoptera
- Superfamily: Noctuoidea
- Family: Erebidae
- Genus: Hypocala
- Species: H. velans

Binomial name
- Hypocala velans Walker, 1857

Synonyms
- Hypocala andremona r. velans

Species of moth

Hypocala velans is a moth of the family Erebidae. It was first described by Francis Walker in 1857. It is endemic to the Hawaiian islands of Kauai, Oahu, Molokai, Maui and Hawaii. It was thought to be extinct until a single specimen was collected at Puʻu Waʻawaʻa in April 1995.

Adults of this species are known to roost in caves.

The larvae feed on Maba sandwicensis.
