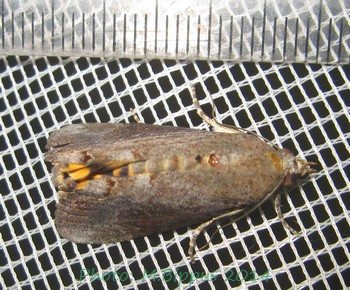

Scientific classification
- Kingdom: Animalia
- Phylum: Arthropoda
- Clade: Pancrustacea
- Class: Insecta
- Order: Lepidoptera
- Superfamily: Noctuoidea
- Family: Erebidae
- Genus: Hypocala
- Species: H. florens

Binomial name
- Hypocala florens Mabille, 1879

= Hypocala florens =

Species of moth

Hypocala florens is a moth of the family Erebidae.

== Distribution ==
It is known from Madagascar and La Réunion
