= Goniapteryx =

Scientific classification
- Domain: Eukaryota
- Kingdom: Animalia
- Phylum: Arthropoda
- Class: Insecta
- Order: Lepidoptera
- Superfamily: Noctuoidea
- Family: Erebidae
- Subfamily: Hypocalinae
- Genus: Goniapteryx; Perty, 1833

Synonyms
- Goniopteryx Agassiz, 1846; Rhescipha Walker, [1866]; Phimodium Herrich-Schäffer, 1870

Genus of moths

Goniapteryx is a genus of moths of the family Erebidae. The genus was erected by Maximilian Perty in 1833.

== Species ==
- Goniapteryx elegans (1878) Jamaica
- Goniapteryx sergilia (Stoll, [1780]) Suriname
- Goniapteryx servia (Stoll, 1782) Texas in the US to Amazonas in Brazil
