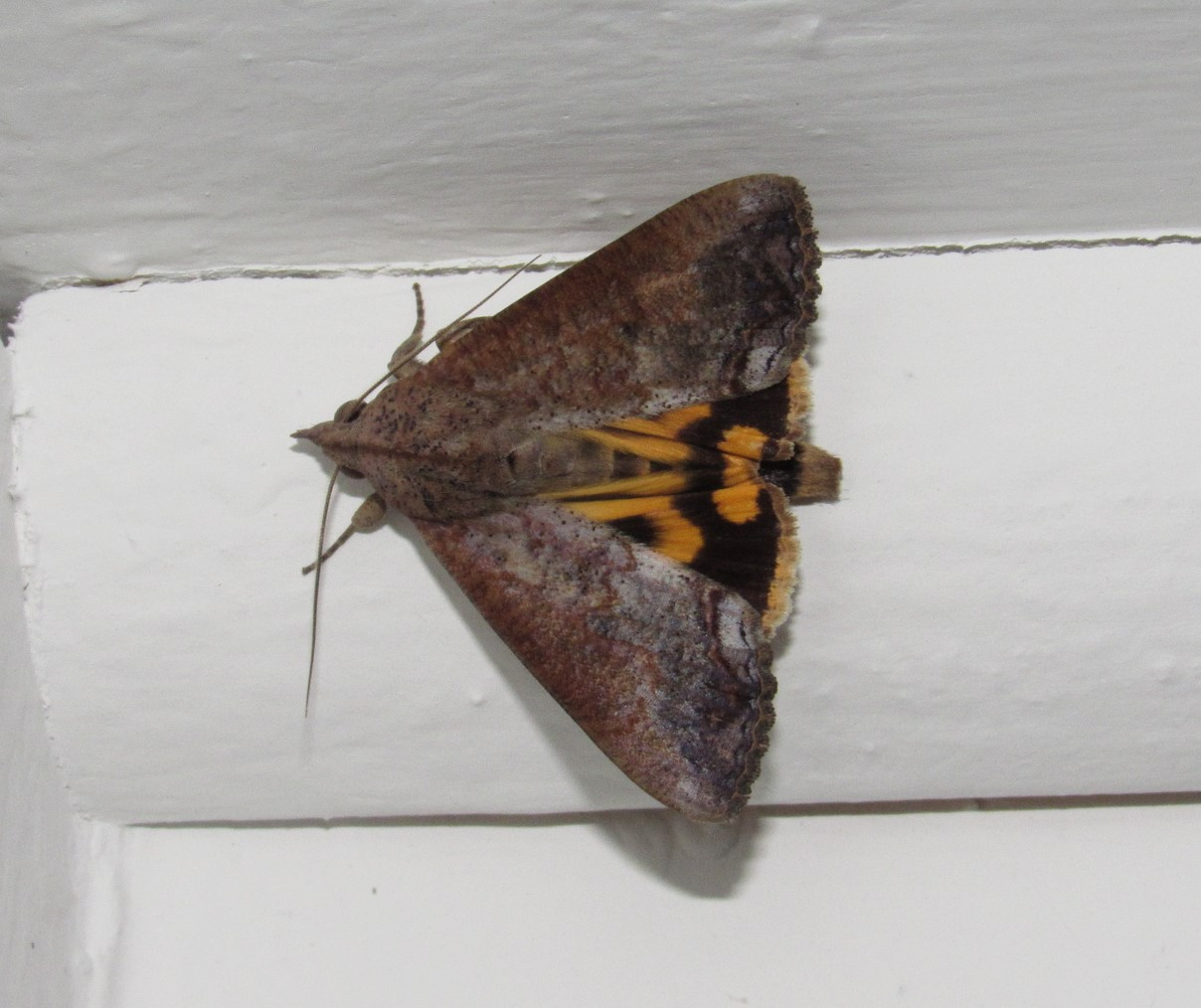

Scientific classification
- Kingdom: Animalia
- Phylum: Arthropoda
- Clade: Pancrustacea
- Class: Insecta
- Order: Lepidoptera
- Superfamily: Noctuoidea
- Family: Erebidae
- Genus: Hypocala
- Species: H. andremona

Binomial name
- Hypocala andremona (Stoll, 1781)

= Hypocala andremona =

Species of moth

Hypocala andremona, the andremona moth, is a species of moth in the family Erebidae. It is found in North America. The Hypocala andremona is a species of moth that is classified as Lepidoptera: Noctuidae or also commonly known as Owlet moths. Hypocala andremona moths reproduce by laying eggs caused by sexual reproduction between a male and a female.

The MONA or Hodges number for Hypocala andremona is 8642.
