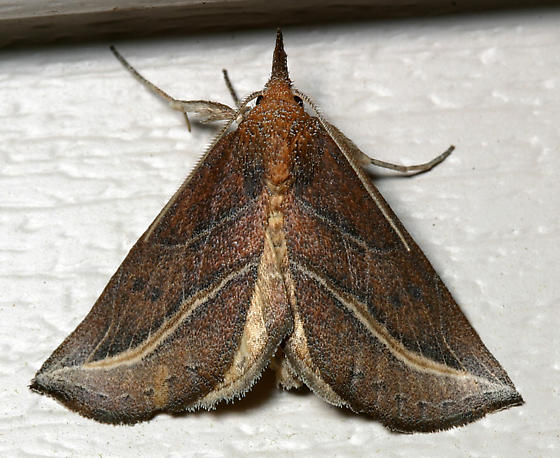

Scientific classification
- Kingdom: Animalia
- Phylum: Arthropoda
- Class: Insecta
- Order: Lepidoptera
- Superfamily: Noctuoidea
- Family: Noctuidae (?)
- Genus: Phyprosopus
- Species: P. callitrichoides

Binomial name
- Phyprosopus callitrichoides Grote, 1872

Synonyms
- Phyprosopus nasutaria Zeller, 1872

= Phyprosopus callitrichoides =

Species of moth

Phyprosopus callitrichoides, the curve-lined owlet, is a moth of the family Erebidae. The species was first described by Augustus Radcliffe Grote in 1872. It is found in the US from New Hampshire to Florida, west to Montana and Texas.

The wingspan is 28–35 mm. Adults are on wing from May to August.

The larvae are described as "fantastically bizarre" and feed on greenbrier species (see Smilax).
