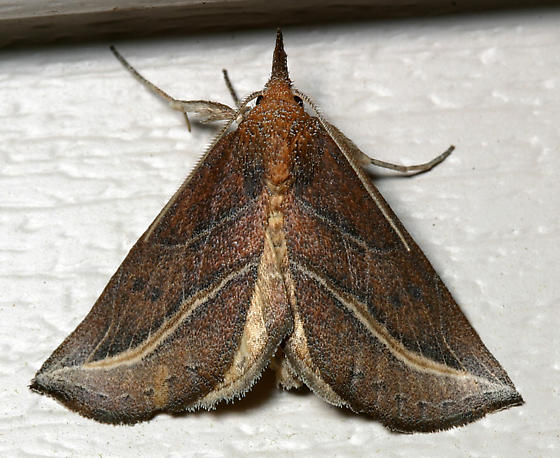
- Phyprosopus callitrichoides

Scientific classification
- Domain: Eukaryota
- Kingdom: Animalia
- Phylum: Arthropoda
- Class: Insecta
- Order: Lepidoptera
- Superfamily: Noctuoidea
- Family: Noctuidae (?)
- Subfamily: Catocalinae
- Genus: Phyprosopus; Grote, 1872

Synonyms
- Sudariophora Zeller, 1872; Phiprosopus Dyar, 1893

= Phyprosopus =

Genus of moths

Phyprosopus is a genus of moths of the family Erebidae. The genus was erected by Augustus Radcliffe Grote in 1872.

== Species ==
- Phyprosopus albigutta (Herrich-Schäffer, 1868) Cuba
- Phyprosopus calligrapha Hampson, 1926 Texas in the US
- Phyprosopus callitrichoides Grote, 1872 New York to Texas in the US
- Phyprosopus ergodan (Dyar, 1921) Guatemala
- Phyprosopus fastigiata (Herrich-Schäffer, 1868) Cuba
- Phyprosopus intertribulus (Dyar, 1921) Cuba
- Phyprosopus pardan (Dyar, 1921) Cuba
- Phyprosopus parthenope (Schaus, 1913) Costa Rica
- Phyprosopus tristriga (Herrich-Schäffer, 1868) Cuba
