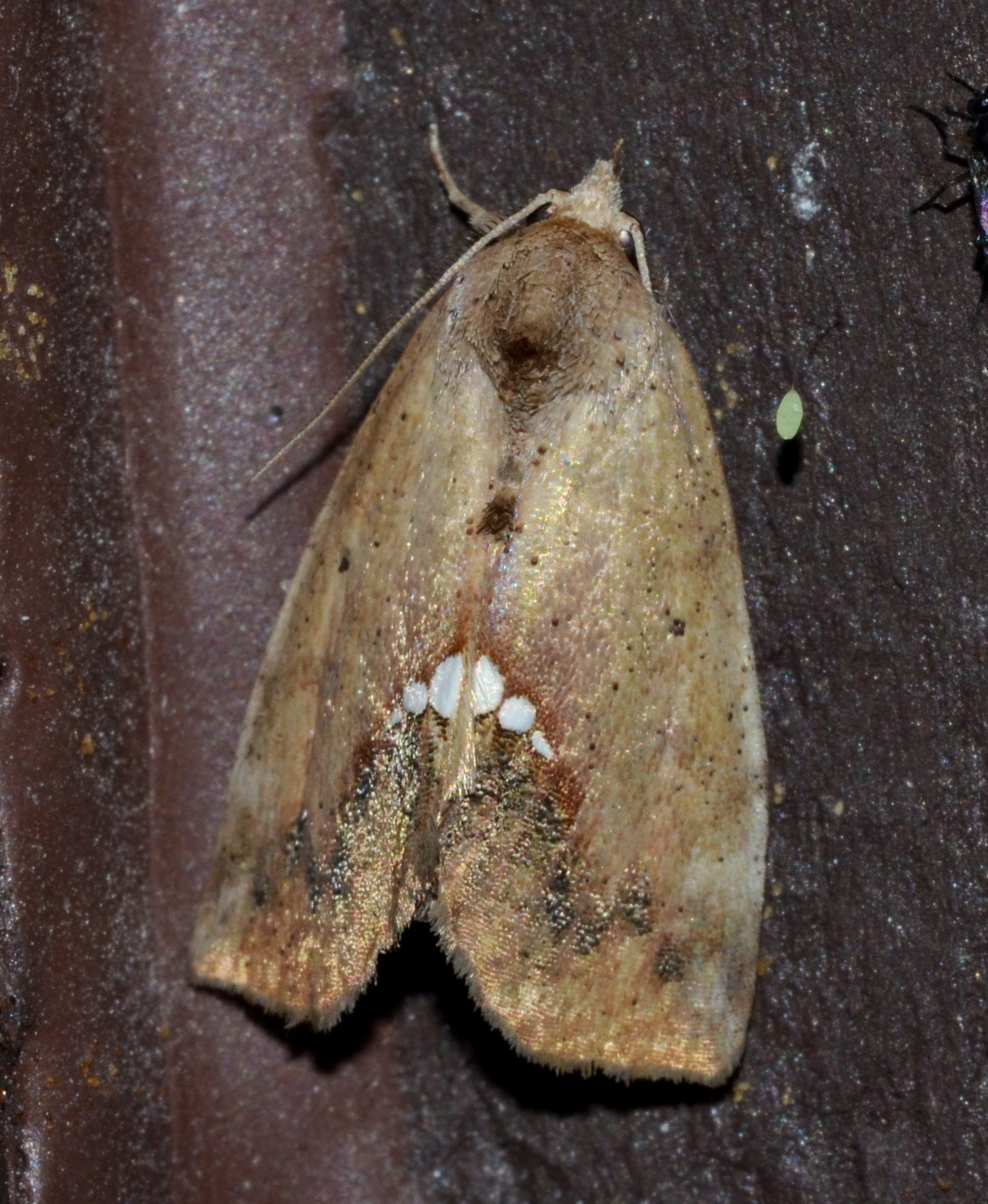
- Hypsoropha hormos (small necklace moth)

Scientific classification
- Kingdom: Animalia
- Phylum: Arthropoda
- Clade: Pancrustacea
- Class: Insecta
- Order: Lepidoptera
- Superfamily: Noctuoidea
- Family: Erebidae
- Subfamily: Hypocalinae
- Genus: Hypsoropha; Hübner, 1818

Synonyms
- Gloee Hübner, 1808; Monogona Guenée, 1852; Tiauspa Walker, 1858

= Hypsoropha =

Genus of moths

Hypsoropha is a genus of moths of the family Erebidae. The genus was erected by Jacob Hübner in 1818.

== Species ==
- Hypsoropha adeona Druce, 1889 Mexico
- Hypsoropha argyria (Butler, 1879) Brazil (Amazonas)
- Hypsoropha baja McCabe, 1992 Baja, Arizona
- Hypsoropha franclemonti McCabe, 1992 Bahamas
- Hypsoropha hormos Hübner, 1818 New Hampshire, New York - Georgia, Florida - Arizona – small necklace moth
- Hypsoropha monilis (Fabricius, 1777) Florida - North Carolina, Illinois, Missouri – large necklace moth
