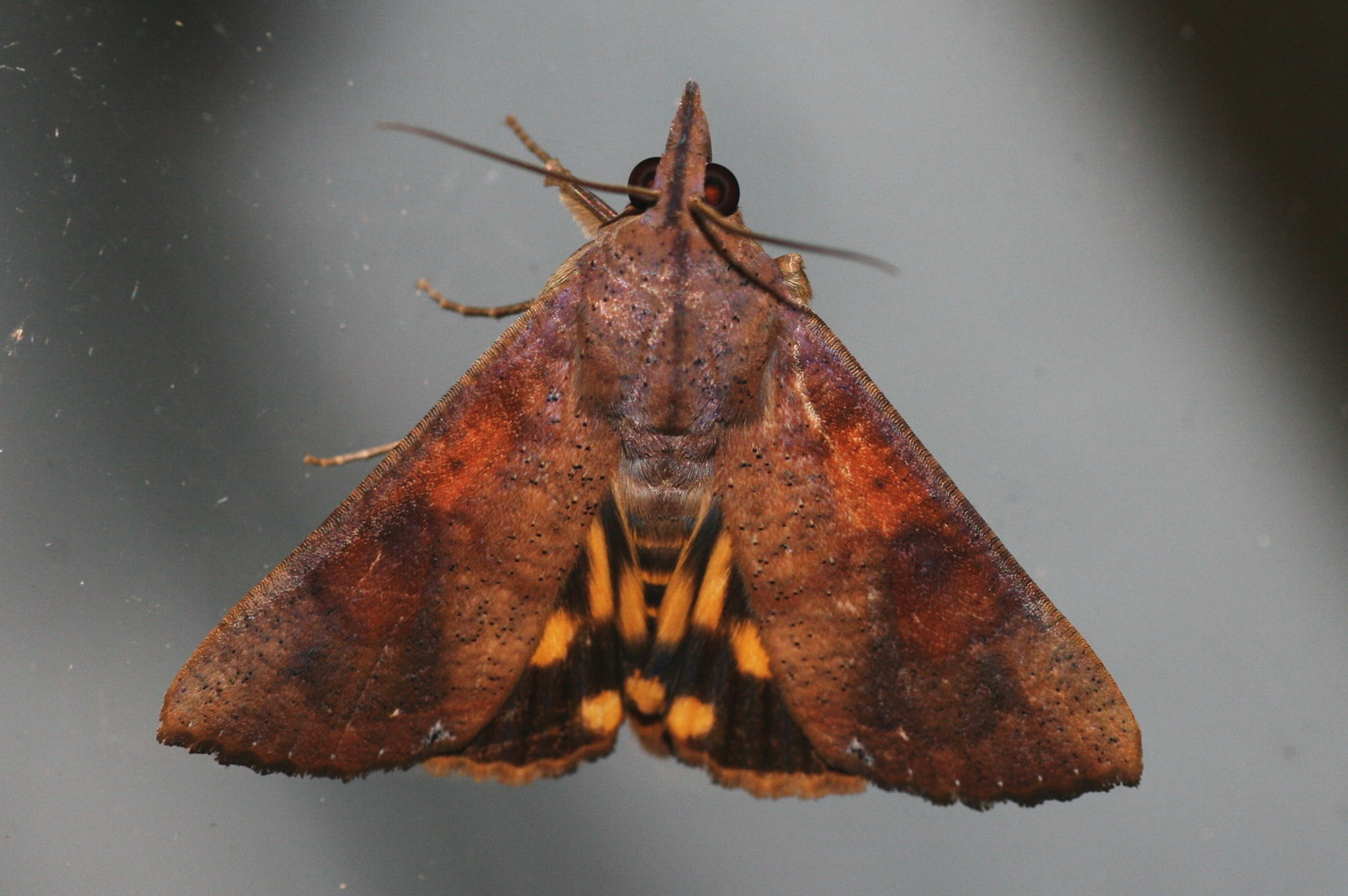

Scientific classification
- Domain: Eukaryota
- Kingdom: Animalia
- Phylum: Arthropoda
- Class: Insecta
- Order: Lepidoptera
- Superfamily: Noctuoidea
- Family: Erebidae
- Genus: Hypocala
- Species: H. violacea

Binomial name
- Hypocala violacea Butler, 1879

Synonyms
- Hypocala clarissima Butler, 1892; Hypocala kebeae Bethune-Baker, 1906

= Hypocala violacea =

Species of moth

Hypocala violacea is a species of moth of the family Erebidae first described by Arthur Gardiner Butler in 1879. It is found in the Indo-Australian tropics of India, Sri Lanka, and Myanmar.

== Description ==
Sri Lankan specimens have black markings on dorsal side of hindwings and ventral side of forewings are rather narrow. The larvae feed on Diospyros species.
