= Phyprosopus tristriga =

Scientific classification
- Kingdom: Animalia
- Phylum: Arthropoda
- Clade: Pancrustacea
- Class: Insecta
- Order: Lepidoptera
- Superfamily: Noctuoidea
- Family: Noctuidae (?)
- Genus: Phyprosopus
- Species: P. tristriga

Binomial name
- Phyprosopus tristriga (Herrich-Schäffer, 1868)

Synonyms
- Basilodes tristriga Herrich-Schäffer, 1868; Phiprosopus albigutta Wolcott, 1924; Basilodes albigutta; Phiprosopus albiguttata; Phyprosopus intertribulus Dyar, 1921; Phyprosopus fastigiata Herrich-Schäffer, 1868; Phyprosopus fastigiatus (Schaus, 1940)

Species of moth

Phyprosopus tristriga is a species of moth in the family Noctuidae. It was first described by Gottlieb August Wilhelm Herrich-Schäffer in 1868 and is endemic to the Antilles, including Dominica, Cuba and Puerto Rico.
