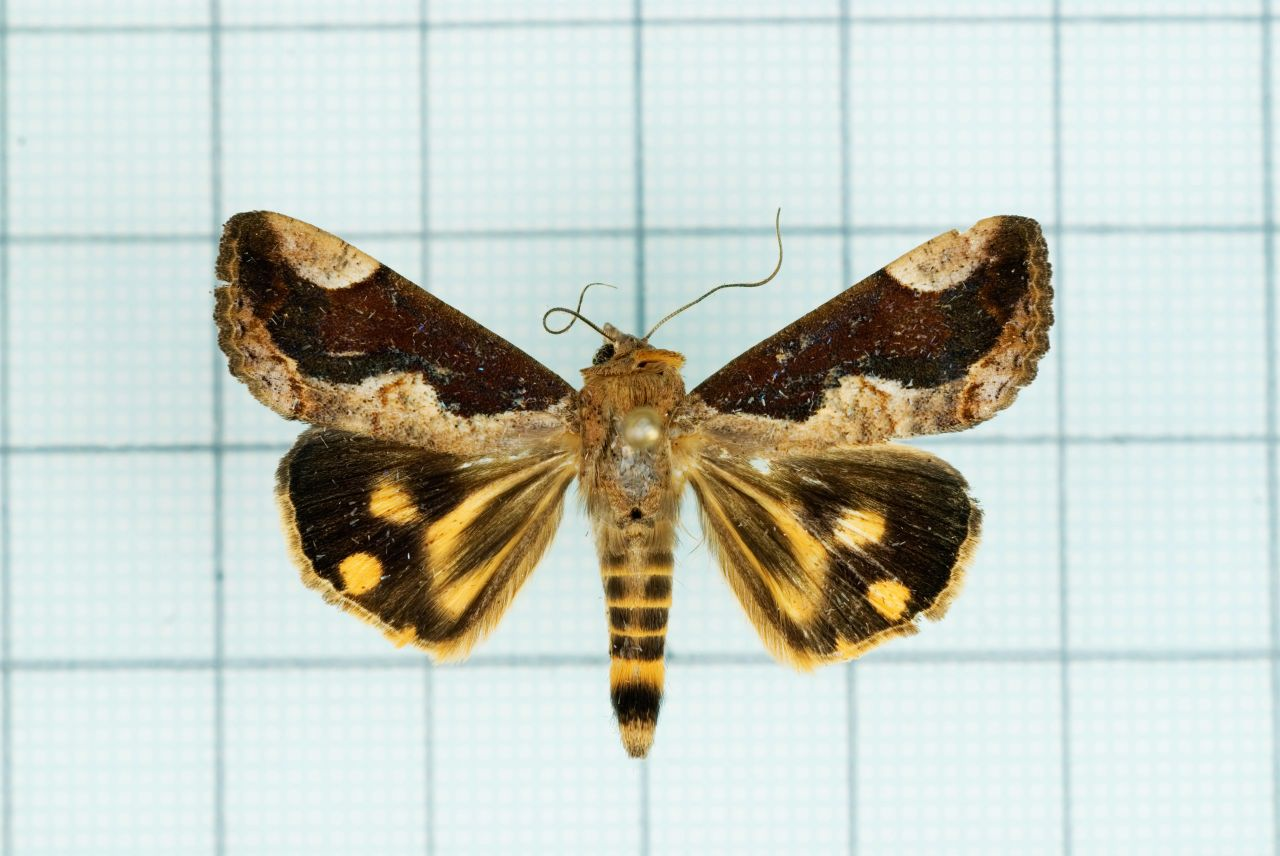
- Hypocala subsatura

Scientific classification
- Domain: Eukaryota
- Kingdom: Animalia
- Phylum: Arthropoda
- Class: Insecta
- Order: Lepidoptera
- Superfamily: Noctuoidea
- Family: Erebidae
- Subfamily: Hypocalinae
- Genus: Hypocala; Guenée, 1852

= Hypocala =

Genus of moths

Hypocala is a genus of moths of the family Erebidae first described by Achille Guenée in 1852.

== Description ==
Palpi porrect (extending forward), triangularly scaled, and rostriform. Antennae ciliated in male. Thorax and abdomen smoothly scaled. Tibia slightly hairy and spineless. Forewings with slightly arched costa towards rectangular apex. Larva with four pairs of abdominal prolegs.

== Species ==
- Hypocala affinis Rothschild, 1915
- Hypocala bohemani (Wallengren, 1856)
- Hypocala andremona Cramer, 1784
- Hypocala deflorata Fabricius, 1792
- Hypocala dysdamarta A. E. Prout, 1927
- Hypocala florens Mabille, 1879
- Hypocala gaedei Berio, 1955
- Hypocala genuina (Wallengren, 1856)
- Hypocala guttiventris Walker, [1858]
- Hypocala plumicornis Guenée, 1852
- Hypocala rostrata (Fabricius, 1794)
- Hypocala subsatura Guenée, 1852
- Hypocala tenuis Walker, 1866
- Hypocala toana Swinhoe, 1915
- Hypocala velans Walker, 1857
- Hypocala violacea Butler, 1879
