= Psammathodoxa =

Scientific classification
- Domain: Eukaryota
- Kingdom: Animalia
- Phylum: Arthropoda
- Class: Insecta
- Order: Lepidoptera
- Superfamily: Noctuoidea
- Family: Erebidae
- Subfamily: Hypocalinae
- Genus: Psammathodoxa; Dyar, 1921

Genus of insects

Psammathodoxa is a genus of moths of the family Erebidae. The genus was erected by Harrison Gray Dyar Jr. in 1921.

== Species ==
- Psammathodoxa cochlidioides Dyar, 1921 Texas in the US
- Psammathodoxa natadoides Franclemont, 1985 Costa Rica
