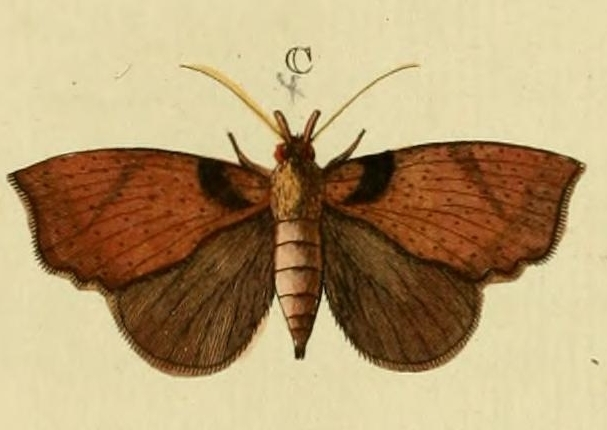

Scientific classification
- Kingdom: Animalia
- Phylum: Arthropoda
- Class: Insecta
- Order: Lepidoptera
- Superfamily: Noctuoidea
- Family: Erebidae
- Genus: Goniapteryx
- Species: G. servia

Binomial name
- Goniapteryx servia (Stoll, 1780)

= Goniapteryx servia =

Species of moth

Goniapteryx servia is a species of moth in the family Erebidae. It is found in North America.

The MONA or Hodges number for Goniapteryx servia is 8544.
