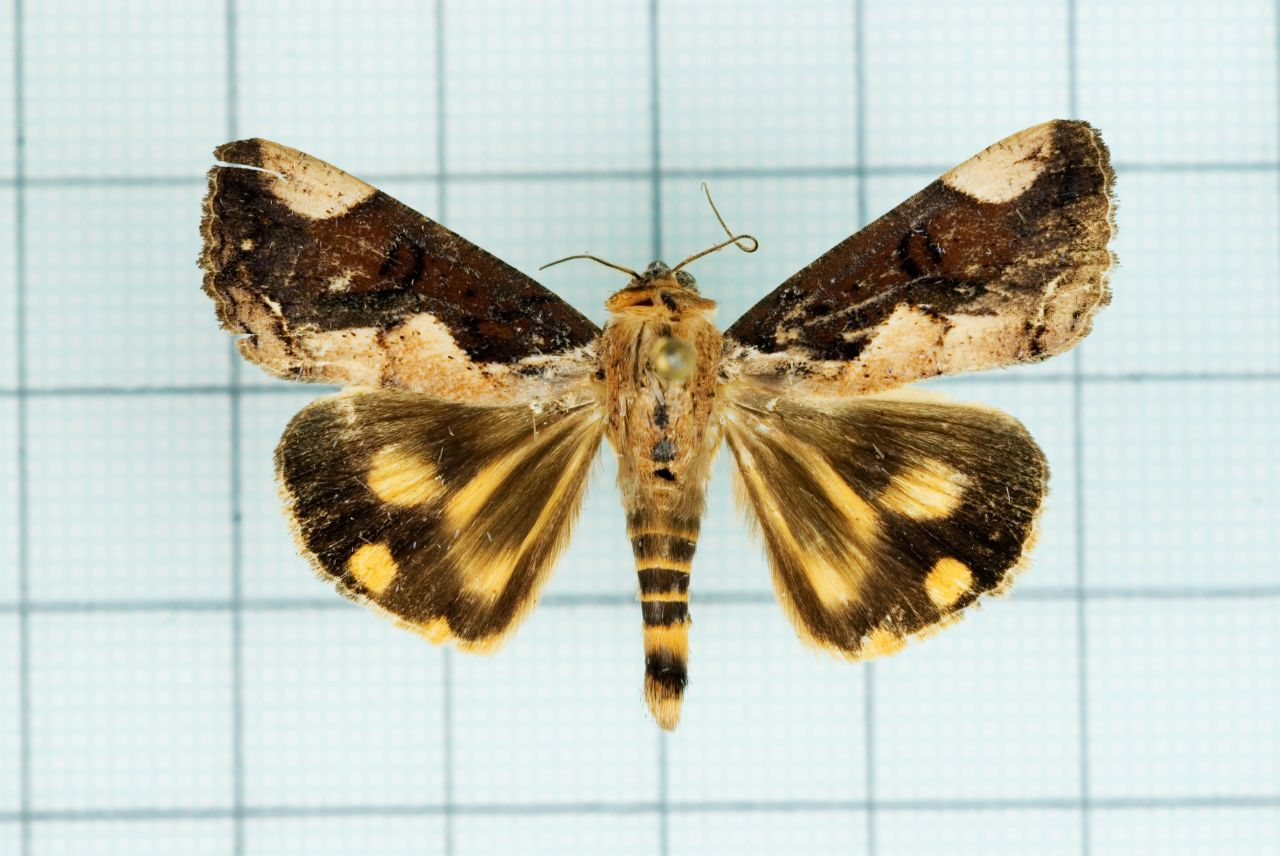

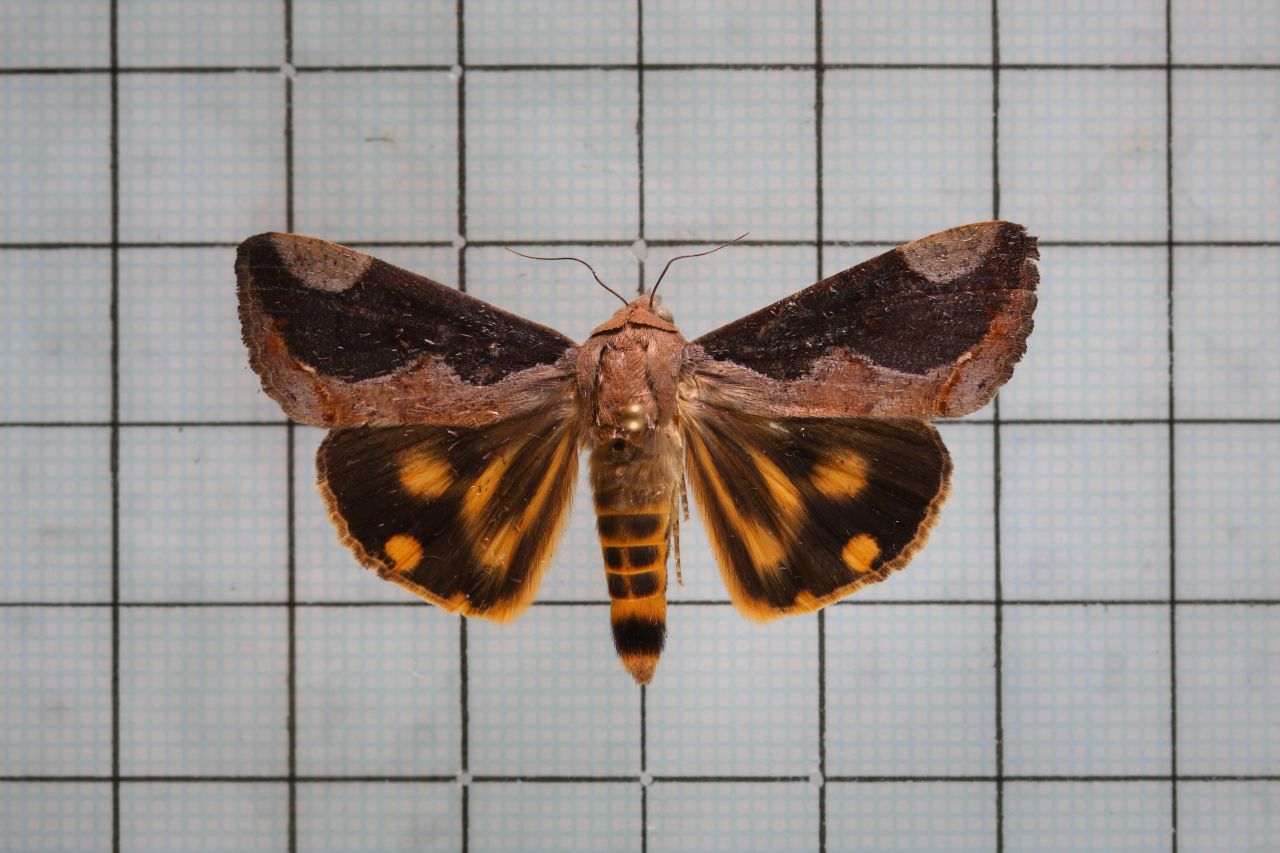

Scientific classification
- Kingdom: Animalia
- Phylum: Arthropoda
- Class: Insecta
- Order: Lepidoptera
- Superfamily: Noctuoidea
- Family: Erebidae
- Genus: Hypocala
- Species: H. subsatura

Binomial name
- Hypocala subsatura Guenée, 1852

Synonyms
- Hypocala aspersa Butler, 1883; Hypocala subsatura var. limbata Butler, 1889

= Hypocala subsatura =

Species of moth

Hypocala subsatura is a species of moth in the family Erebidae. It is found from the Oriental region to Sundaland.

Larvae have been recorded feeding on Diospyros, Quercus, Garcinia, Caesalpinia, Carapa and Xylocarpus species. There are also records for Malus and Citrus species, but these might be related to adult feeding.
