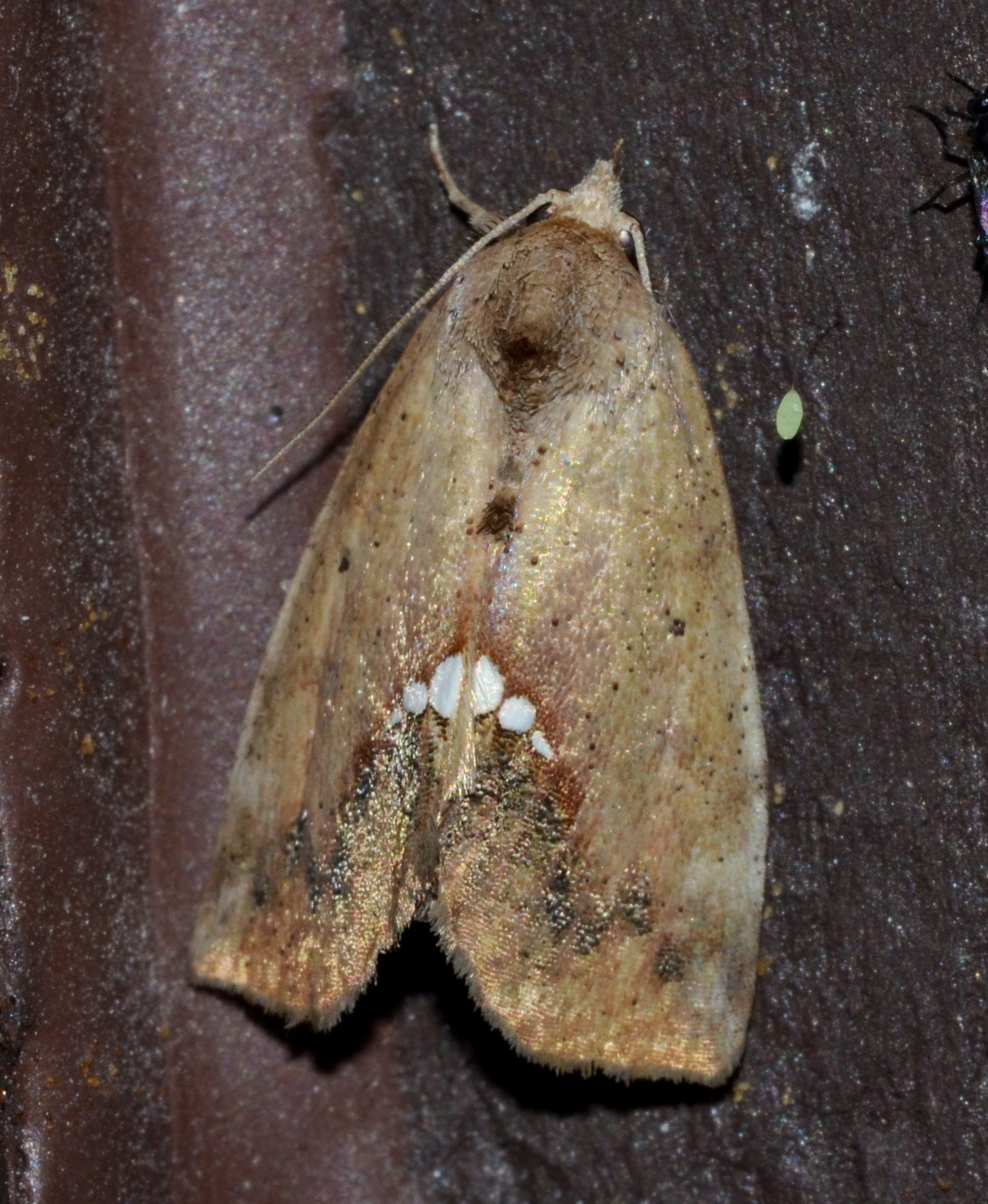

Scientific classification
- Kingdom: Animalia
- Phylum: Arthropoda
- Class: Insecta
- Order: Lepidoptera
- Superfamily: Noctuoidea
- Family: Erebidae
- Genus: Hypsoropha
- Species: H. hormos

Binomial name
- Hypsoropha hormos Hübner, 1818

= Hypsoropha hormos =

Species of moth

Hypsoropha hormos, the small necklace moth, is a moth of the family Erebidae. The species was first described by Jacob Hübner in 1818 and it is found in the southeastern United States.

== Description ==
Adult wings are brown with a postmedial band of white spots meeting at the inner margins, like a white necklace. The species is similar in appearance to the larger large necklace moth (Hypsoropha monilis), and the ranges of the two species broadly overlap.

== Range ==
The species' occurrence range extends from Texas and Kansas in the west to Florida and New Jersey in the east.

== Life cycle ==
=== Adults ===
Adults have been reported from February to October, with most sightings from April to August.
