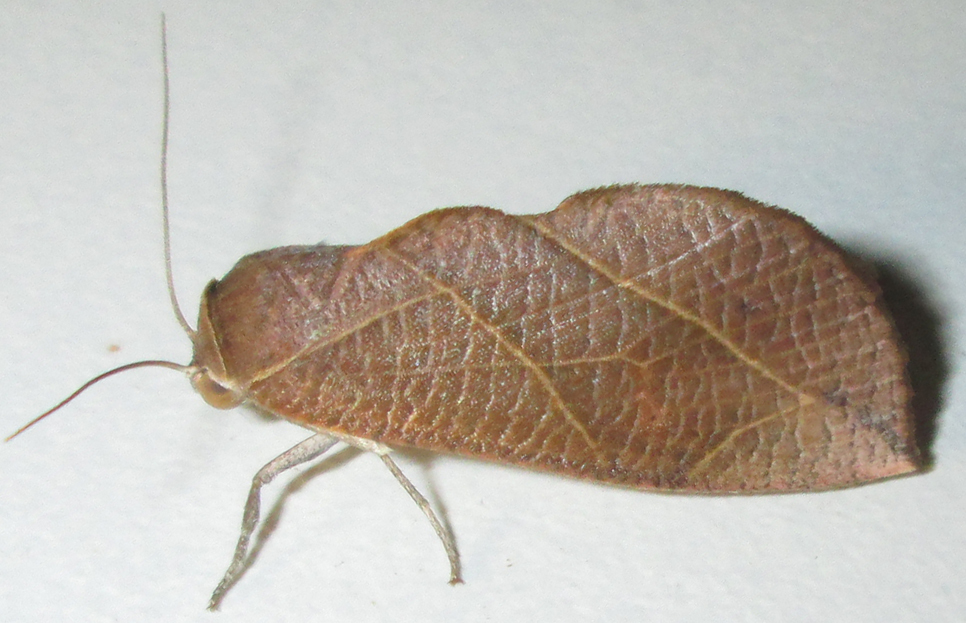

Scientific classification
- Kingdom: Animalia
- Phylum: Arthropoda
- Class: Insecta
- Order: Lepidoptera
- Superfamily: Noctuoidea
- Family: Erebidae
- Subfamily: Calpinae
- Genus: Arcyophora; Guenée in Boisduval & Guenée, 1852

Synonyms
- Setoctena Wallengren, 1863; Euxestis Lederer, 1869; Pseudocalpe Hampson, 1894; Metaculasta Butler, 1898; Gonioxestis Hampson, 1912

= Arcyophora =

Genus of moths

Arcyophora is a genus of moths of the family Erebidae. The genus was erected by Achille Guenée in 1852.

== Species ==
- Arcyophora amydropoliata Hacker, 2013 Yemen
- Arcyophora bothrophora Hampson, 1907 Sri Lanka
- Arcyophora dentula (Lederer, 1869) Iran, India
- Arcyophora dives (Butler, 1898) Kenya
- Arcyophora elegantula Grünberg, 1910 South Africa, Zaire (Katanga)
- Arcyophora endoglauca (Hampson, 1910) Tanzania, Zambia, Zaire (Katanga)
- Arcyophora icterica (Swinoe, 1886) southern India
- Arcyophora ledereri (Wallengren, 1863) Namibia, South Africa
- Arcyophora longivalvis Guenée, 1852 Arabia, Yemen, Sudan, Ethiopia, Somalia, Eritrea, Tanzania, Mozambique, Malawi, Botswana, Zambia, Zimbabwe, South Africa, Namibia, Cameroon, Zaire, Guinea
- Arcyophora nudipes Wallengren, 1856 South Africa
- Arcyophora patricula (Hampson, 1902) Zimbabwe, Zambia, Mozambique, Malawi, Tanzania, Kenya, Ethiopia, Eritrea, Sudan, Saudi Arabia, Nigeria, Zaire, Senegal, Cameroon
- Arcyophora polla (Schaus, 1893) Sierra Leone
- Arcyophora stalii (Wallengren, 1863) Botswana
- Arcyophora sylvatica Büttiker, 1962 Cambodia
- Arcyophora trigramma (Hampson, 1912) north-western India
- Arcyophora zanderi Felder & Rogenhofer, 1875 Ethiopia, Zaire, Guinea, Namibia
