= Psammathodoxa cochlidioides =

Scientific classification
- Kingdom: Animalia
- Phylum: Arthropoda
- Clade: Pancrustacea
- Class: Insecta
- Order: Lepidoptera
- Superfamily: Noctuoidea
- Family: Erebidae
- Genus: Psammathodoxa
- Species: P. cochlidioides

Binomial name
- Psammathodoxa cochlidioides Dyar, 1921

Synonyms
- Phyprosopus calligrapha Hampson, 1926

Species of moth

Psammathodoxa cochlidioides is a species of moth in the family Erebidae. It was described by Harrison Gray Dyar Jr. in 1921. It is found from southern Texas to Mexico.

The wingspan is about 25 mm. The forewings are creamy brown, shaded darker except along the costa and basally. The wing is crossed by about fourteen light lines, irregularly waved, giving an irrorated appearance. A straight pale line, brown-edged within, runs from the apex to the middle of the inner margin. The hindwings are brown.
