= Hoplolythra =

Scientific classification
- Kingdom: Animalia
- Phylum: Arthropoda
- Class: Insecta
- Order: Lepidoptera
- Superfamily: Noctuoidea
- Family: Noctuidae
- Subfamily: Acronictinae
- Genus: Hoplolythra; Hampson, 1910

Genus of moths

Hoplolythra, erected as a moth genus by George Hampson in 1910, is now considered a synonym of Cirrhophanus Grote, 1872 by Butterflies and Moths of the World or of Eulithosia H. Edwards, 1884 by Lepidoptera and Some Other Life Forms.

== Former species ==
- Hoplolythra arivaca is now Hoplolythrodes arivaca Barnes, 1907
- Hoplolythra discistriga is now Eulithosia discistriga J. B. Smith, 1903
