= Cirrhophanus pretiosa =

Scientific classification
- Domain: Eukaryota
- Kingdom: Animalia
- Phylum: Arthropoda
- Class: Insecta
- Order: Lepidoptera
- Superfamily: Noctuoidea
- Family: Noctuidae
- Genus: Cirrhophanus
- Species: C. pretiosa

Binomial name
- Cirrhophanus pretiosa (Morrison, 1875)

Species of moth

Cirrhophanus pretiosa is a moth of the family Noctuidae first described by Herbert Knowles Morrison in 1875. It is found in North America, including Texas, Oklahoma, and Florida.

It was considered a synonym of Cirrhophanus triangulifer for some time, but was elevated from synonymy by Robert W. Poole in 1995.
