= Eulithosia composita =

Scientific classification
- Domain: Eukaryota
- Kingdom: Animalia
- Phylum: Arthropoda
- Class: Insecta
- Order: Lepidoptera
- Superfamily: Noctuoidea
- Family: Noctuidae
- Subfamily: Stiriinae
- Tribe: Stiriini
- Genus: Eulithosia
- Species: E. composita

Binomial name
- Eulithosia composita H. Edwards, 1884

Species of moth

Eulithosia composita is a moth of the family Noctuidae first described by Henry Edwards in 1884. It is found in North America, including Arizona and western Texas.
