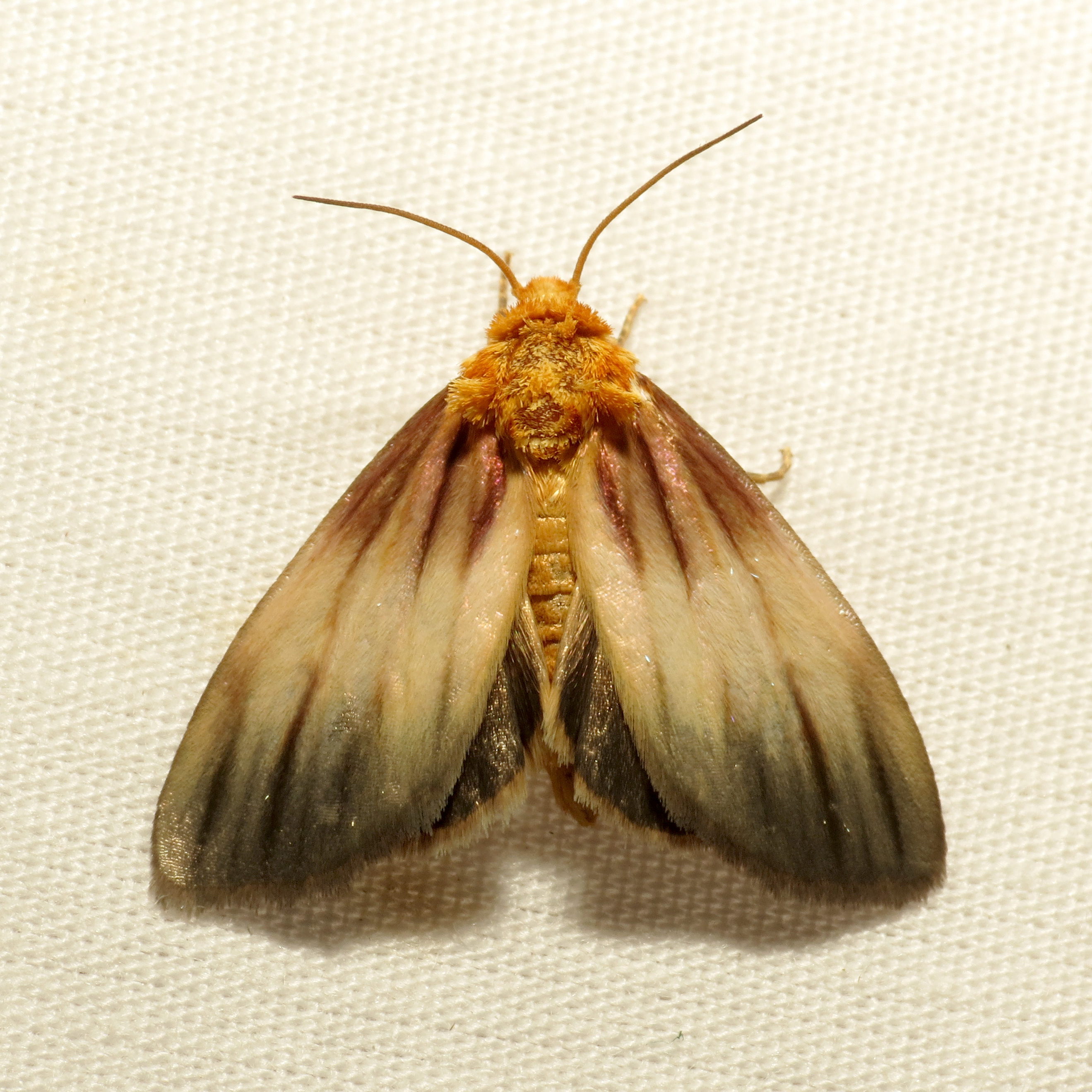
- Eulithosia plesioglauca

Scientific classification
- Domain: Eukaryota
- Kingdom: Animalia
- Phylum: Arthropoda
- Class: Insecta
- Order: Lepidoptera
- Superfamily: Noctuoidea
- Family: Noctuidae
- Subfamily: Stiriinae
- Tribe: Stiriini
- Genus: Eulithosia; H. Edwards, 1884

Synonyms
- Hoplolythra (Acronyctinae) Hampson, 1910

= Eulithosia =

Genus of moths

Eulithosia is a genus of moths of the family Noctuidae erected by Henry Edwards in 1884.

== Taxonomy ==
The Global Lepidoptera Names Index gives this name as a synonym of Antaplaga Grote, 1877 and Butterflies and Moths of the World gives it as a synonym of Cirrhophanus Grote, 1972.

== Species ==
- Eulithosia composita H. Edwards, 1884 Arizona, western Texas
- Eulithosia discistriga (Smith, 1903) California, Arizona, western Texas, southern Nevada, southern California, northern Baja California
- Eulithosia plesioglauca (Dyar, 1912) Mexico, Arizona
- Eulithosia papago (Barnes, 1907) southern New Mexico
- Eulithosia miaiphona (Dyar, 1912) Mexico
