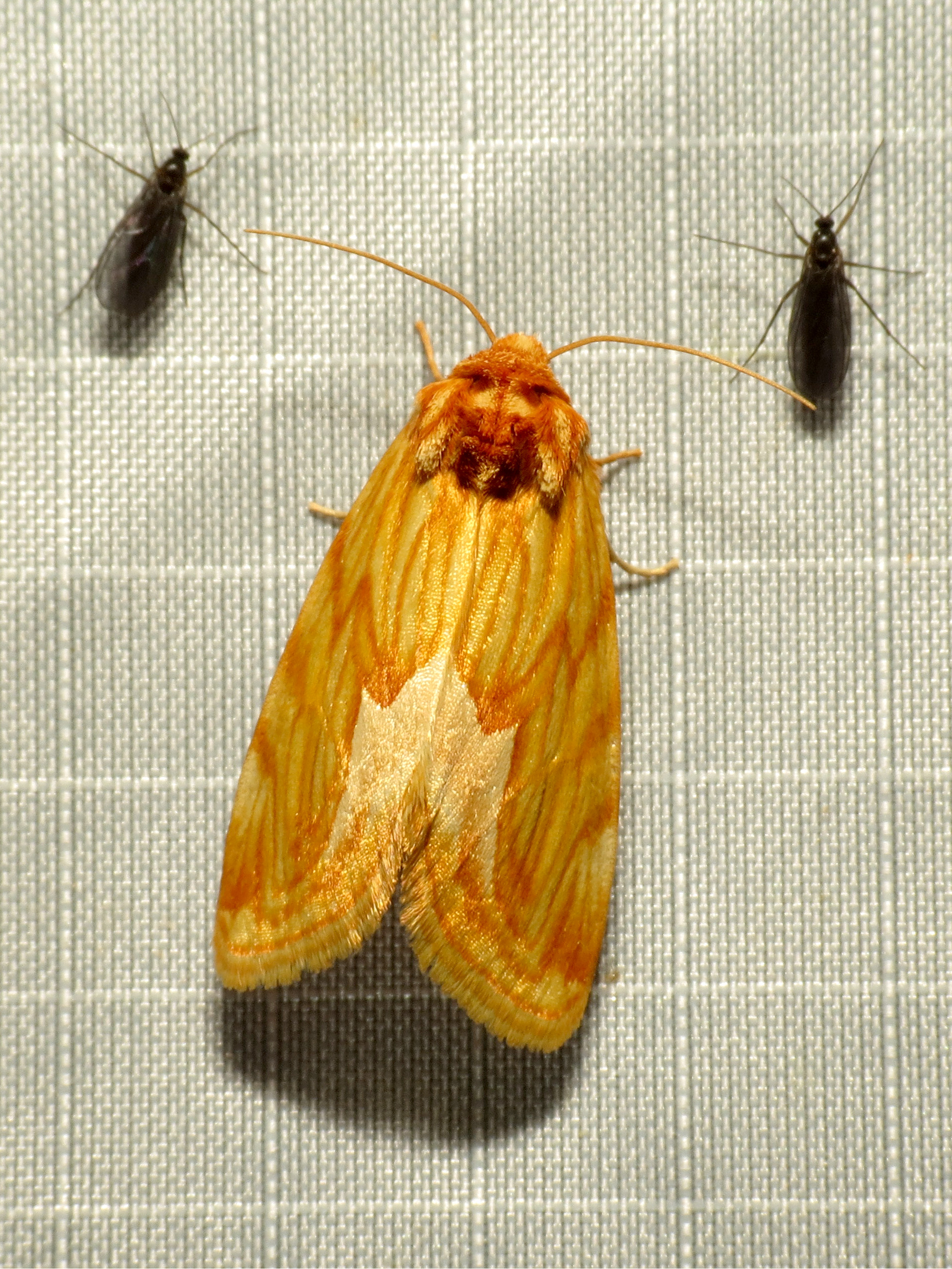

Scientific classification
- Domain: Eukaryota
- Kingdom: Animalia
- Phylum: Arthropoda
- Class: Insecta
- Order: Lepidoptera
- Superfamily: Noctuoidea
- Family: Noctuidae
- Subfamily: Stiriinae
- Tribe: Stiriini
- Genus: Cirrhophanus
- Species: C. dyari

Binomial name
- Cirrhophanus dyari Cockerell, 1899

= Cirrhophanus dyari =

Species of moth

Cirrhophanus dyari is a moth in the family Noctuidae (the owlet moths) first described by Theodore Dru Alison Cockerell in 1899. It is found in North America.

The MONA or Hodges number for Cirrhophanus dyari is 9765.
