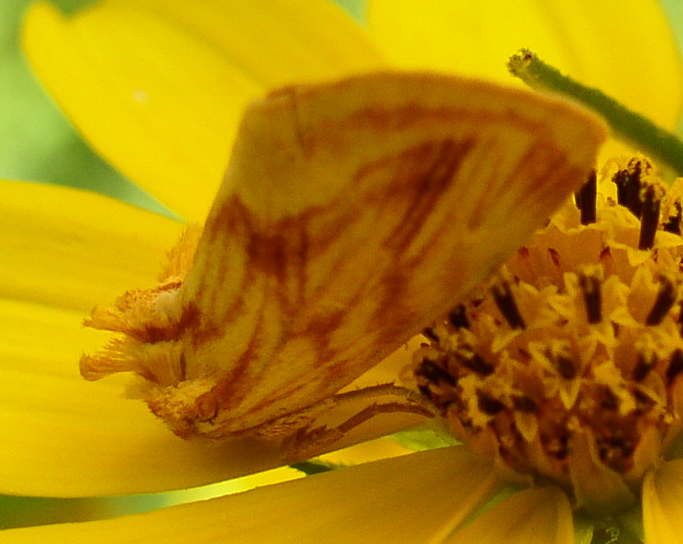
- Cirrhophanus triangulifer (Goldenrod Stowaway), Pennsylvania, United States
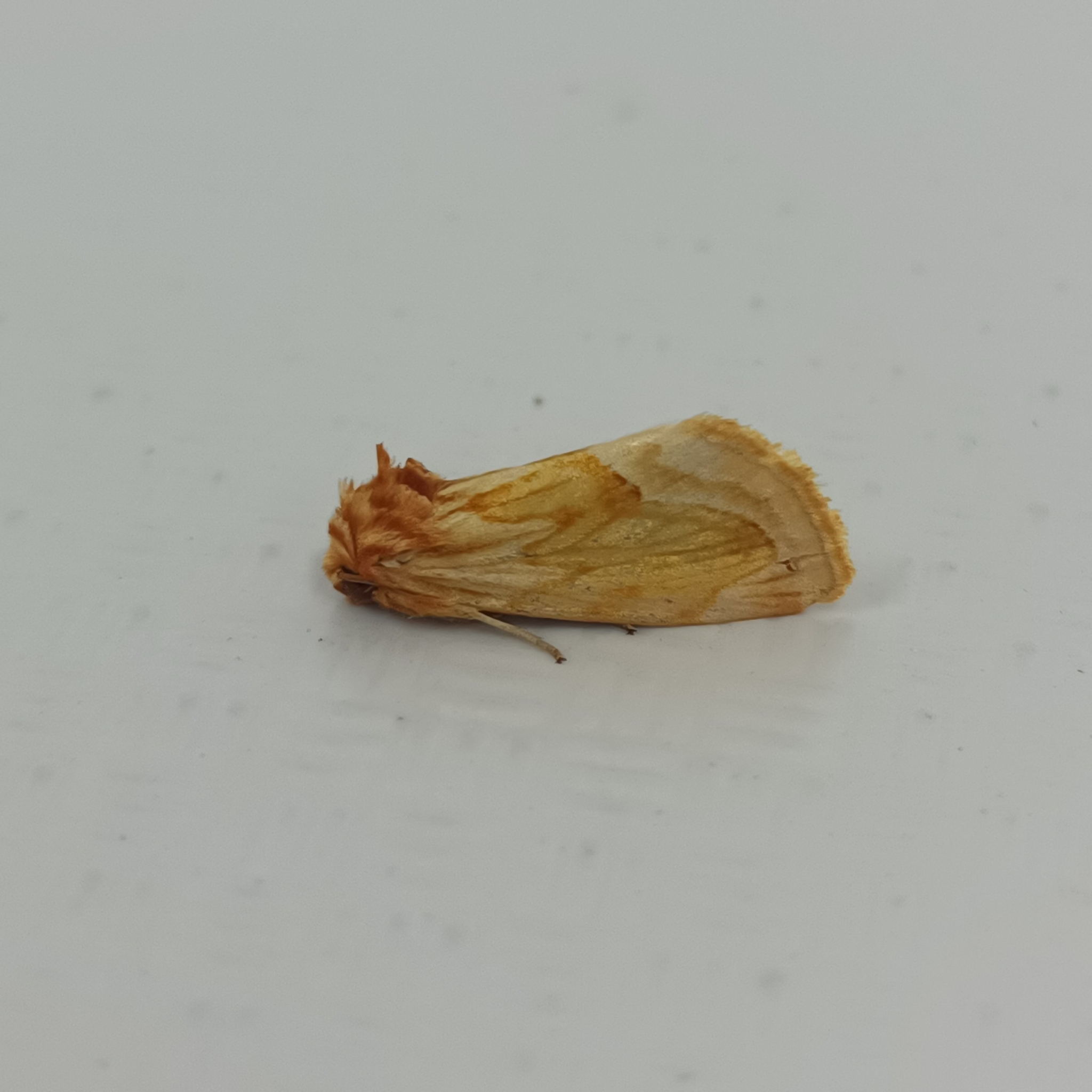
- Cirrhophanus nigrifer

Scientific classification
- Kingdom: Animalia
- Phylum: Arthropoda
- Class: Insecta
- Order: Lepidoptera
- Superfamily: Noctuoidea
- Family: Noctuidae
- Subfamily: Stiriinae
- Tribe: Stiriini
- Genus: Cirrhophanus; Grote, 1872

Synonyms
- Phaioecia Dyar, 1911

= Cirrhophanus =

Genus of moths

Cirrhophanus is a genus of moths belonging to the family Noctuidae.

The genus was erected by Augustus Radcliffe Grote in 1872.

== Species ==
This genus currently contains seven described species, they are:

- Cirrhophanus dubifer Dyar, 1907 Mexico
- Cirrhophanus dyari Cockerell, 1899 Arizona, western Texas, northern Mexico
- Cirrhophanus hoffmanni Hogue, 1963
- Cirrhophanus magnifer Dyar, 1907 Mexico
- Cirrhophanus nigrifer Dyar, 1907 Mexico
- Cirrhophanus pretiosa (Morrison, 1875) Kansas, Texas, Oklahoma, South Dakota, Arkansas
- Cirrhophanus triangulifer Grote, 1872 Missouri, from (New York, New Jersey - Florida) - to (Kansas, Texas)

=== Former species ===
- Cirrhophanus papago is now Eulithosia papago (Barnes, 1907)
- Cirrhophanus plesioglauca is now Eulithosia plesioglauca (Dyar, 1912)
