= Eulithosia discistriga =

Scientific classification
- Domain: Eukaryota
- Kingdom: Animalia
- Phylum: Arthropoda
- Class: Insecta
- Order: Lepidoptera
- Superfamily: Noctuoidea
- Family: Noctuidae
- Subfamily: Stiriinae
- Tribe: Stiriini
- Genus: Eulithosia
- Species: E. discistriga

Binomial name
- Eulithosia discistriga (Smith, 1903)

Species of moth

Eulithosia discistriga is a species of moth in the family Noctuidae (the owlet moths).

The MONA or Hodges number for Eulithosia discistriga is 9769.
