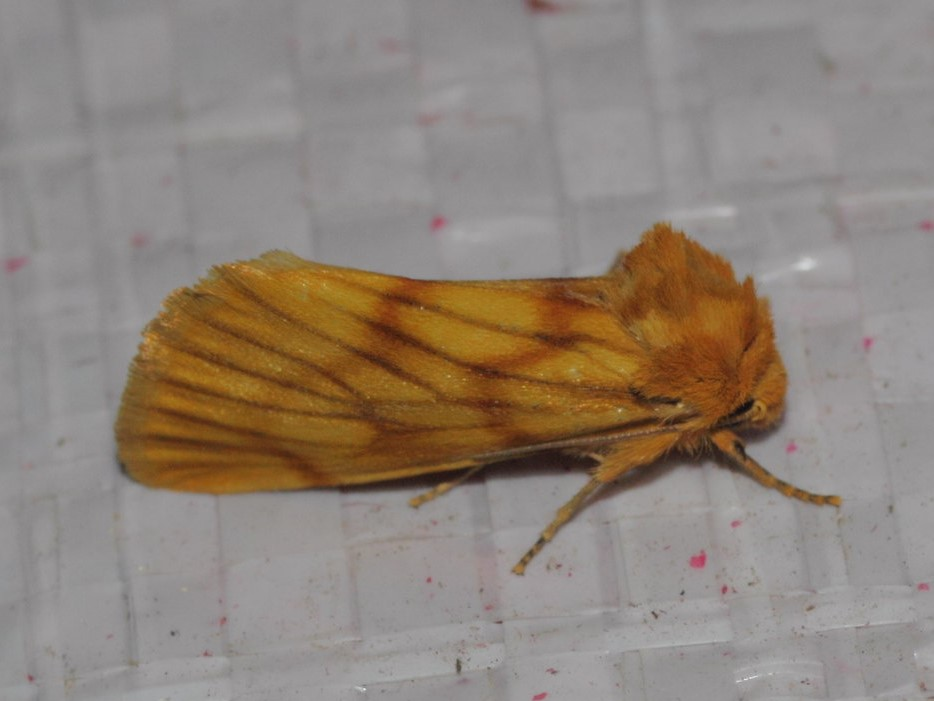

Scientific classification
- Kingdom: Animalia
- Phylum: Arthropoda
- Class: Insecta
- Order: Lepidoptera
- Superfamily: Noctuoidea
- Family: Noctuidae
- Genus: Eulithosia
- Species: E. papago

Binomial name
- Eulithosia papago Barnes, 1907

= Eulithosia papago =

Species of moth

Eulithosia papago is a species of moth in the owlet moth family Noctuidae. It was first described by William Barnes in 1907 and it is found in North America.
