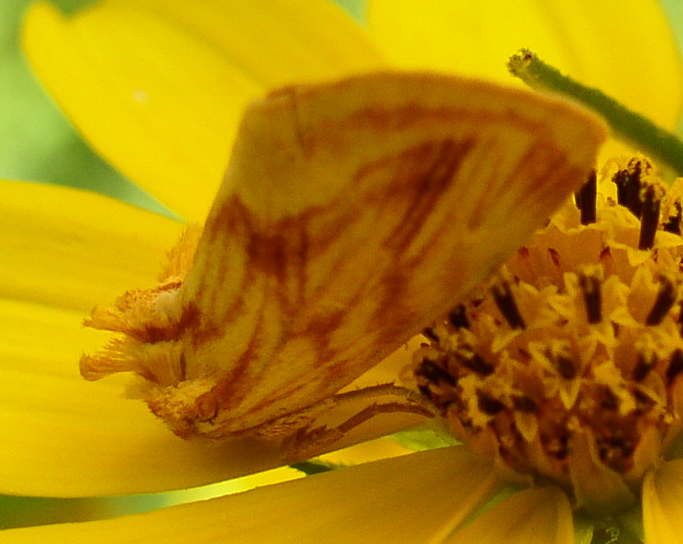

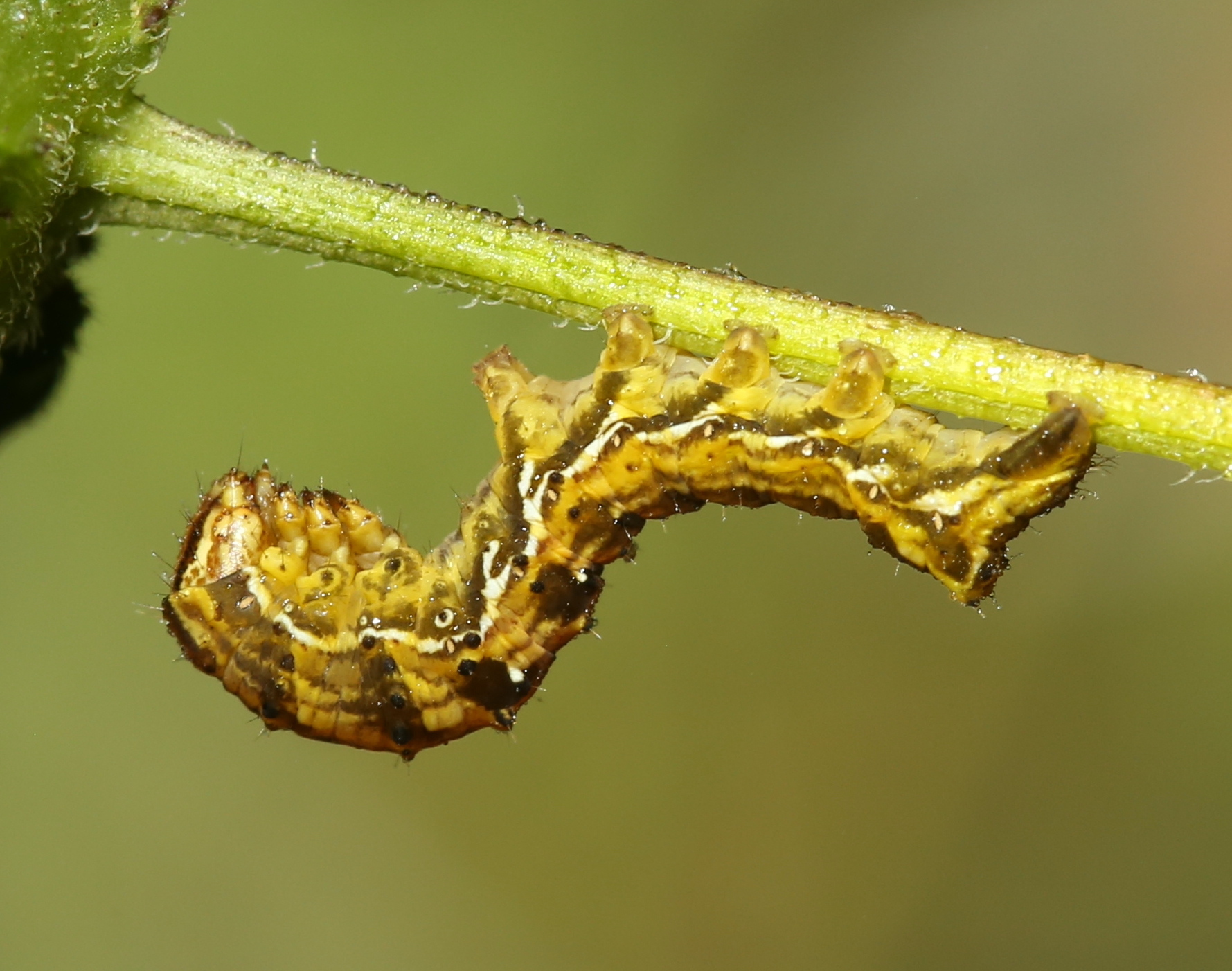
- Larva on Bidens aristosa

Scientific classification
- Kingdom: Animalia
- Phylum: Arthropoda
- Class: Insecta
- Order: Lepidoptera
- Superfamily: Noctuoidea
- Family: Noctuidae
- Genus: Cirrhophanus
- Species: C. triangulifer

Binomial name
- Cirrhophanus triangulifer Grote, 1872

= Cirrhophanus triangulifer =

Species of moth

Cirrhophanus triangulifer, the goldenrod stowaway or tickseed moth, is a moth of the family Noctuidae. The species was first described by Augustus Radcliffe Grote in 1872. It is found in the US from New York to Florida, west to Texas and Oklahoma, north to Wisconsin. In Canada, it has only been recorded from Ontario.

The wingspan is 30–44 mm. Adults are on wing from August to September.

Adults can be found on the flowers of Solidago, Coreopsis, Bidens or yellow flowered species during the day.

The larvae feed on Bidens species, including Bidens bipinnata.
