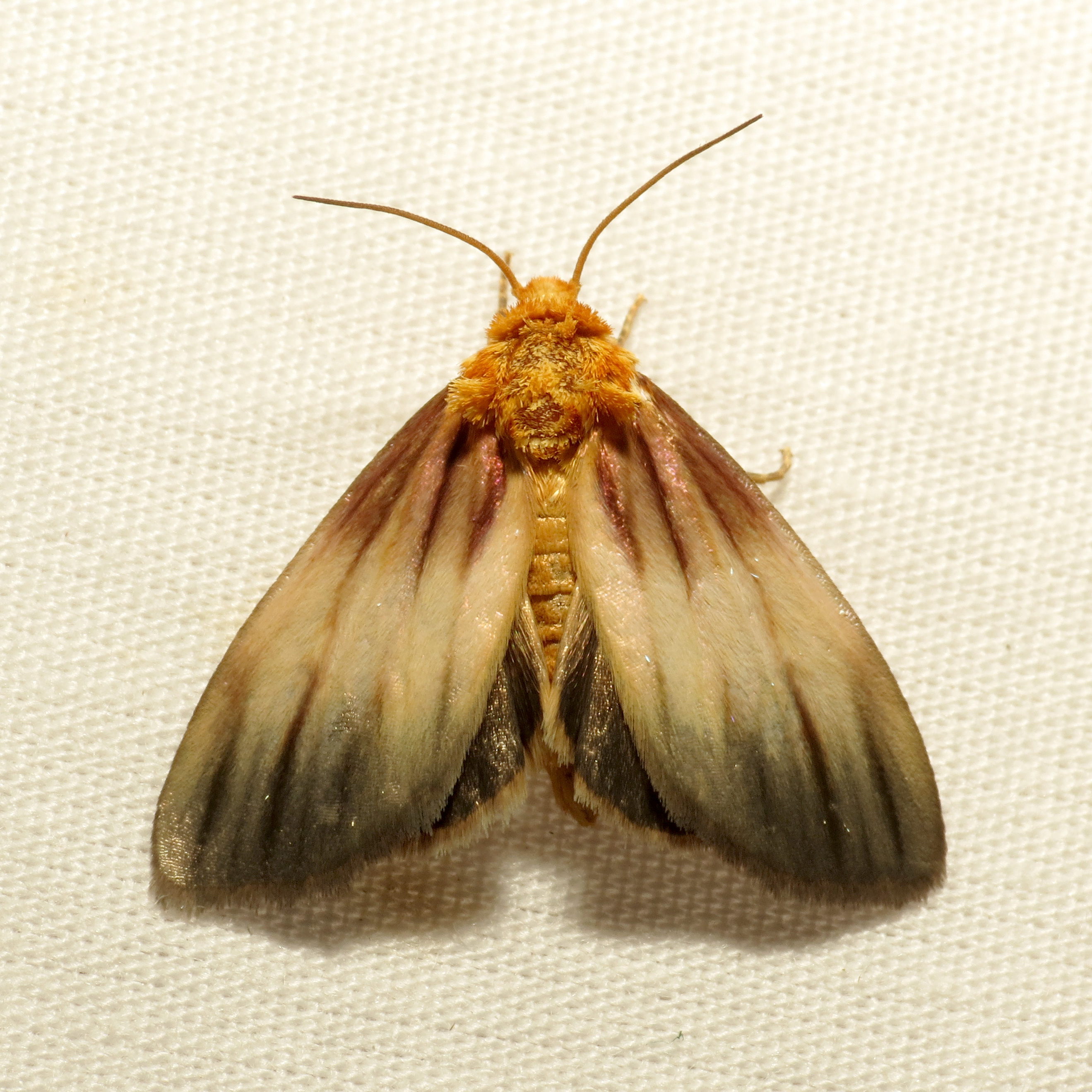

Scientific classification
- Kingdom: Animalia
- Phylum: Arthropoda
- Clade: Pancrustacea
- Class: Insecta
- Order: Lepidoptera
- Superfamily: Noctuoidea
- Family: Noctuidae
- Genus: Eulithosia
- Species: E. plesioglauca

Binomial name
- Eulithosia plesioglauca (Dyar, 1912)

= Eulithosia plesioglauca =

Species of moth

Eulithosia plesioglauca is an owlet moth (family Noctuidae). The species was first described by Harrison Gray Dyar Jr. in 1912.

The MONA or Hodges number for Eulithosia plesioglauca is 9767.
