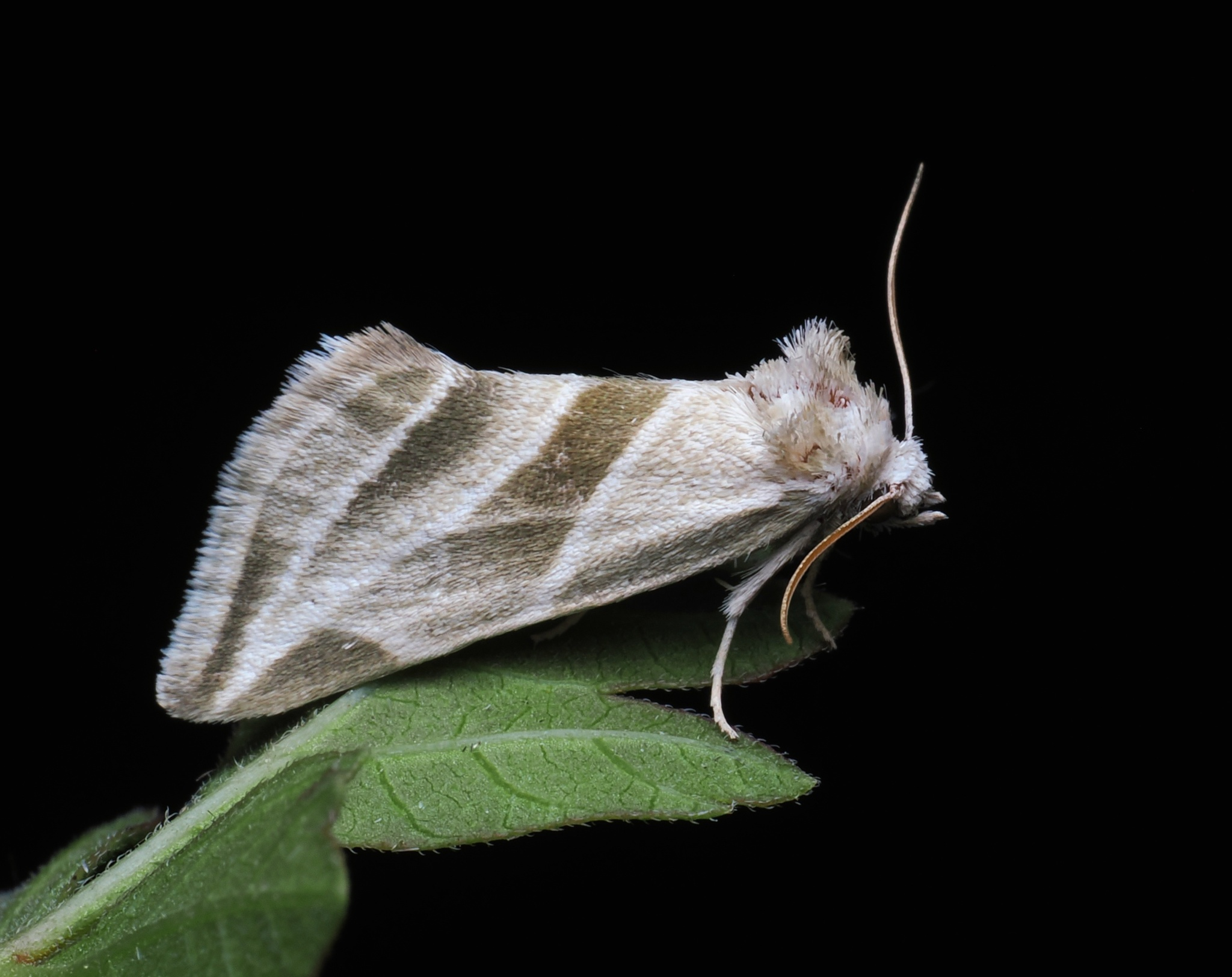
- Polenta tepperi (formerly Plagiomimicus tepperi)

Scientific classification
- Kingdom: Animalia
- Phylum: Arthropoda
- Clade: Pancrustacea
- Class: Insecta
- Order: Lepidoptera
- Superfamily: Noctuoidea
- Family: Noctuidae
- Subfamily: Stiriinae
- Tribe: Stiriini
- Genus: Polenta; Morrison, 1875

= Polenta (moth) =

Genus of moths

Polenta is a genus of moths of the family Noctuidae. It occurs in North America.

== Taxonomy ==
Polenta was considered a synonym of Plagiomimicus for several years, but subsequently (2026) restored as a valid genus. Some former species are now in Lineostriastiria.

== Species ==
The valid species are:

- Polenta argyropolia (Dyar, 1914)
- Polenta incomitatus (Mustelin, 2018)
- Polenta mimica (Poole, 1995)
- Polenta phalaenoides (Dyar, 1918)
- Polenta psamathochromum (Dyar, 1909)
- Polenta tepperi (Morrison, 1875)
- Polenta yakama (Crabo & Wikle, 2018)

=== Former species ===
Several former species are since treated elsewhere, including:

- Polenta biundulalis (Zeller, 1872)
- Polenta hachita (Barnes, 1904)
- Polenta hutsoni (J.B. Smith, 1907)
- Polenta olivalis (Barnes & McDunnough, 1916)
- Polenta sexseriata (Grote, 1881)
