= Polenta (disambiguation) =

Polenta may refer to:

- Polenta, an Italian dish made from boiled cornmeal
- Polenta (moth), a synonym of the moth genus Plagiomimicus in the family Noctuidae
- A locality near Bertinoro in Romagna, Italy
- The da Polenta family, also known as the Polenta and as the Polentani, from the same area
- Diego Polenta (born 1992), Uruguayan footballer
