= Polenta mimica =

Scientific classification
- Kingdom: Animalia
- Phylum: Arthropoda
- Clade: Pancrustacea
- Class: Insecta
- Order: Lepidoptera
- Superfamily: Noctuoidea
- Family: Noctuidae
- Subfamily: Stiriinae
- Tribe: Stiriini
- Genus: Polenta
- Species: P. mimica

Binomial name
- Polenta mimica (Poole, 1995)

Synonyms
- Plagiomimicus mimica Poole, 1995

Species of moth

Polenta mimica is a species of moth in the family Noctuidae (the owlet moths). It was originally described as Plagiomimicus mimica and can be found in some sources under that prior combination. It is found in western North America in the United States and in Mexico.

The forewing length is 11–13 mm (0.43–0.51 in). Its host plant is Brickellia.
