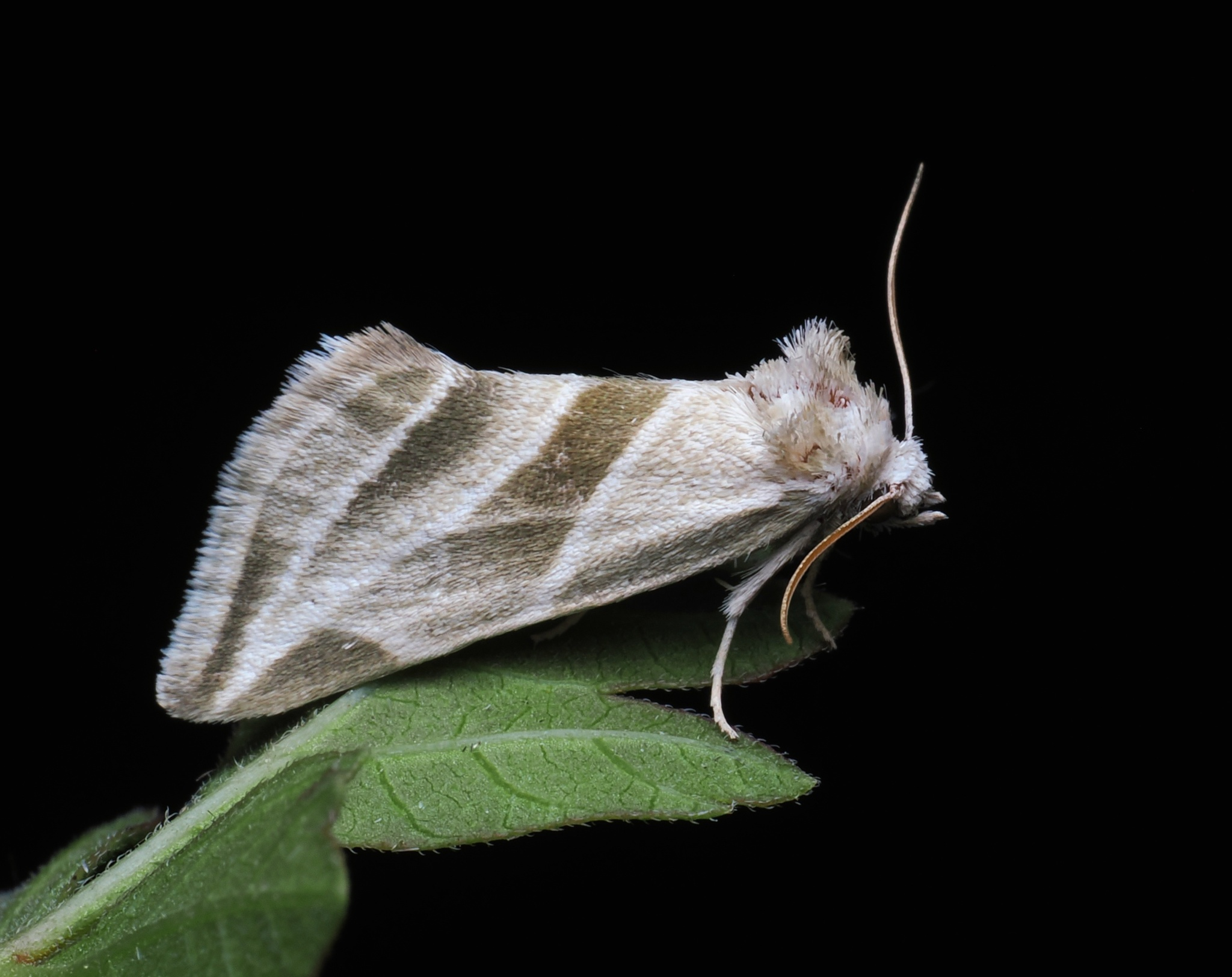
- Polenta tepperi from Rock Creek, Colorado Springs, CO, USA

Scientific classification
- Kingdom: Animalia
- Phylum: Arthropoda
- Clade: Pancrustacea
- Class: Insecta
- Order: Lepidoptera
- Superfamily: Noctuoidea
- Family: Noctuidae
- Genus: Polenta
- Species: P. tepperi

Binomial name
- Polenta tepperi (Morrison, 1875)

Synonyms
- Schinia tepperi Morrison, 1875; Plagiomimicus tepperi (Morrison, 1875); Plagiomimicus richii (Grote, 1886)

= Polenta tepperi =

Species of moth

Polenta tepperi is a species of moth in the family Noctuidae (the owlet moths). It was originally described as Schinia tepperi Morrison, 1875, but later treated as Plagiomimicus tepperi. It is found in western North America in the United States and in Mexico.

The forewing length is 12.5–13.5 mm (0.49–0.53 in). It host plant is Brickellia.

== Gallery ==
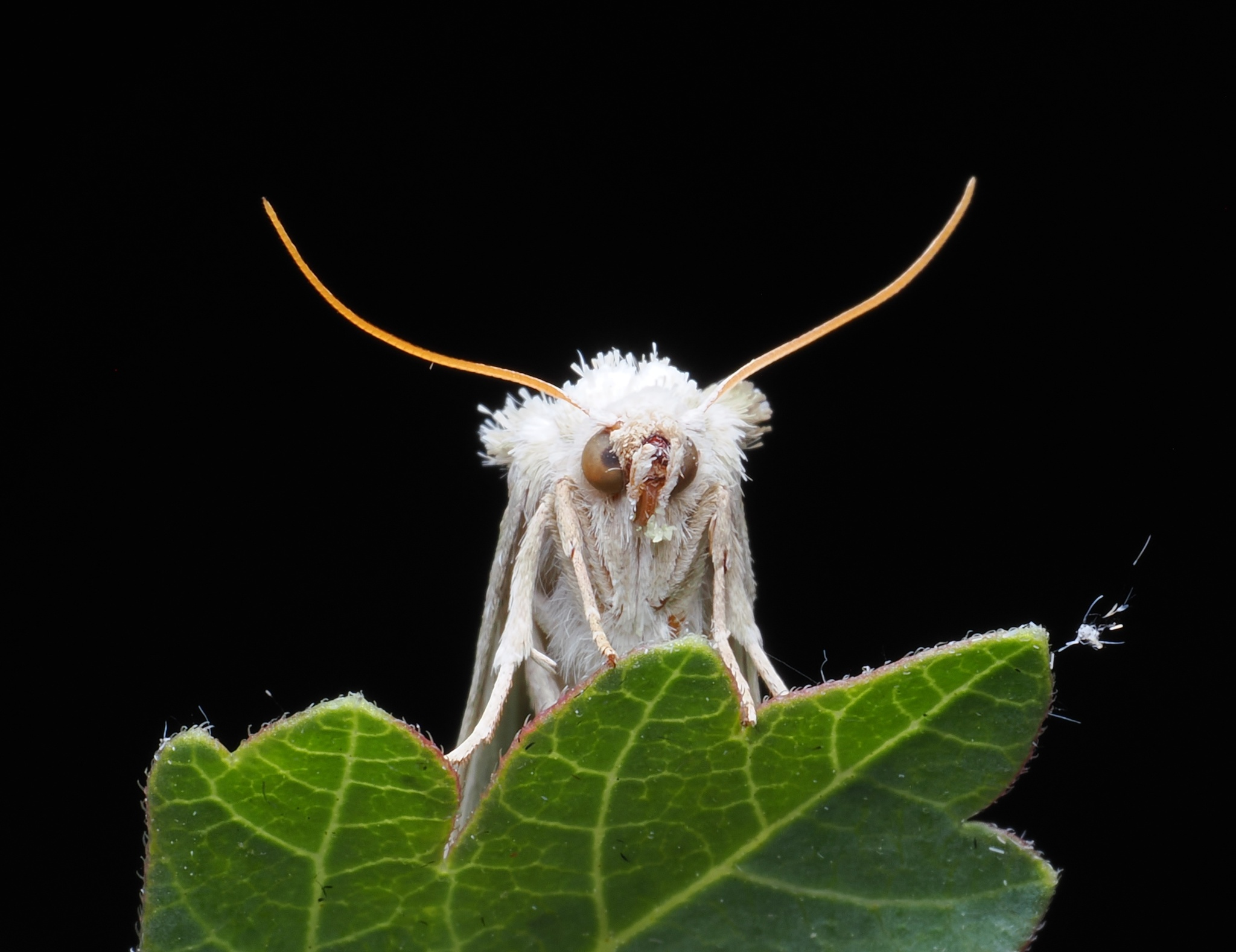
Polenta tepperi from Rock Creek, Colorado Springs, CO, USA

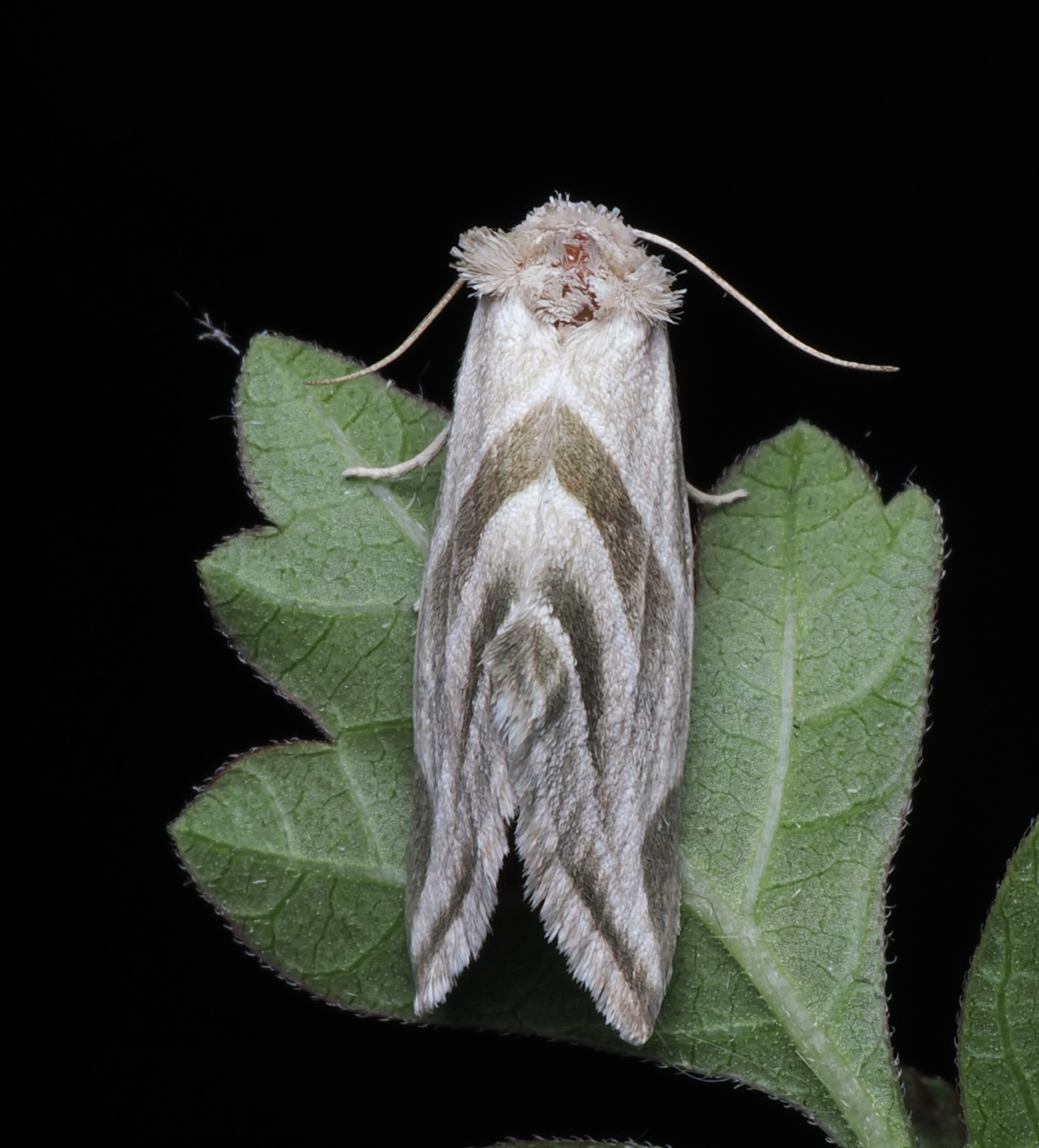
Polenta tepperi from Rock Creek, Colorado Springs, CO, USA

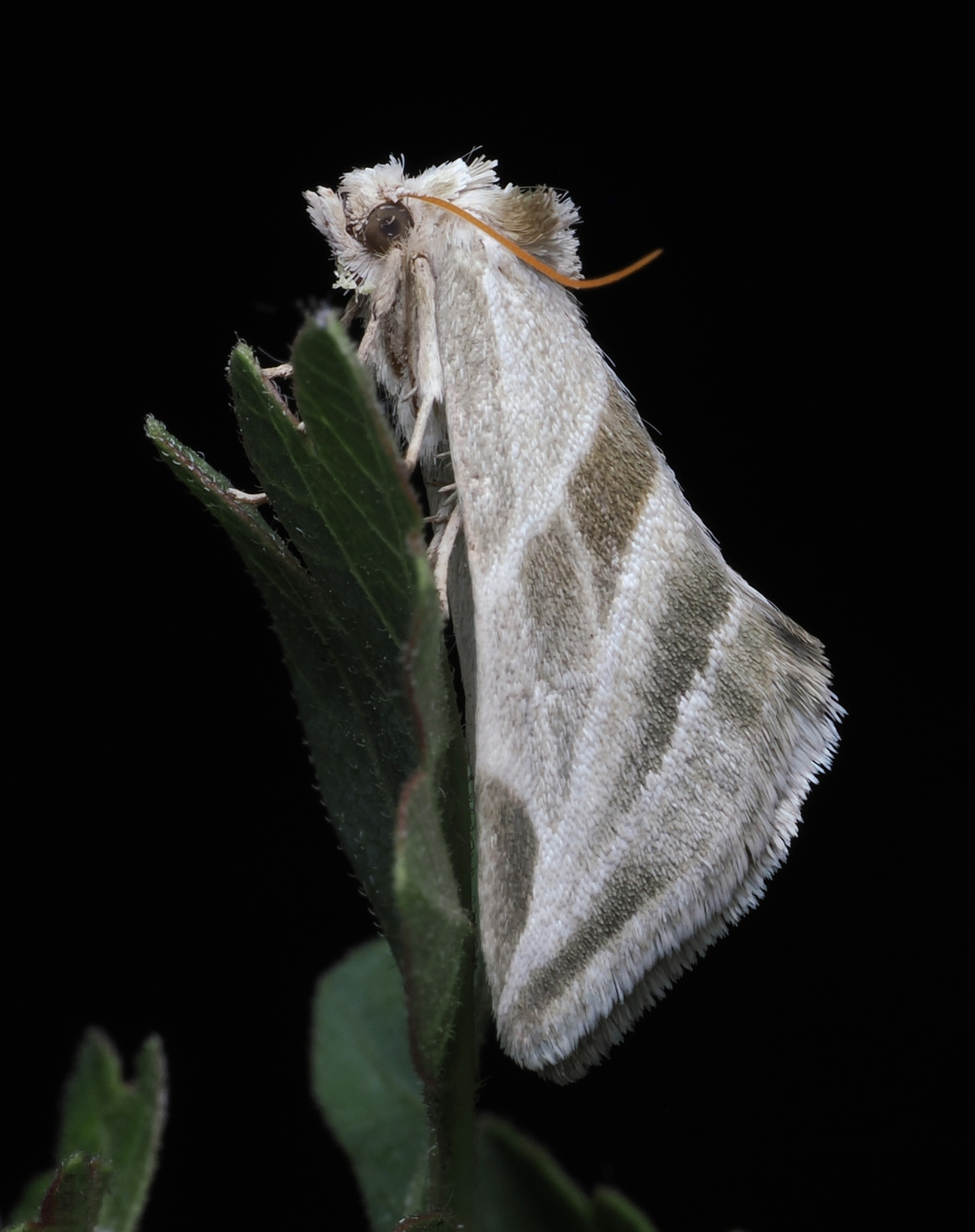
Polenta tepperi from Rock Creek, Colorado Springs, CO, USA

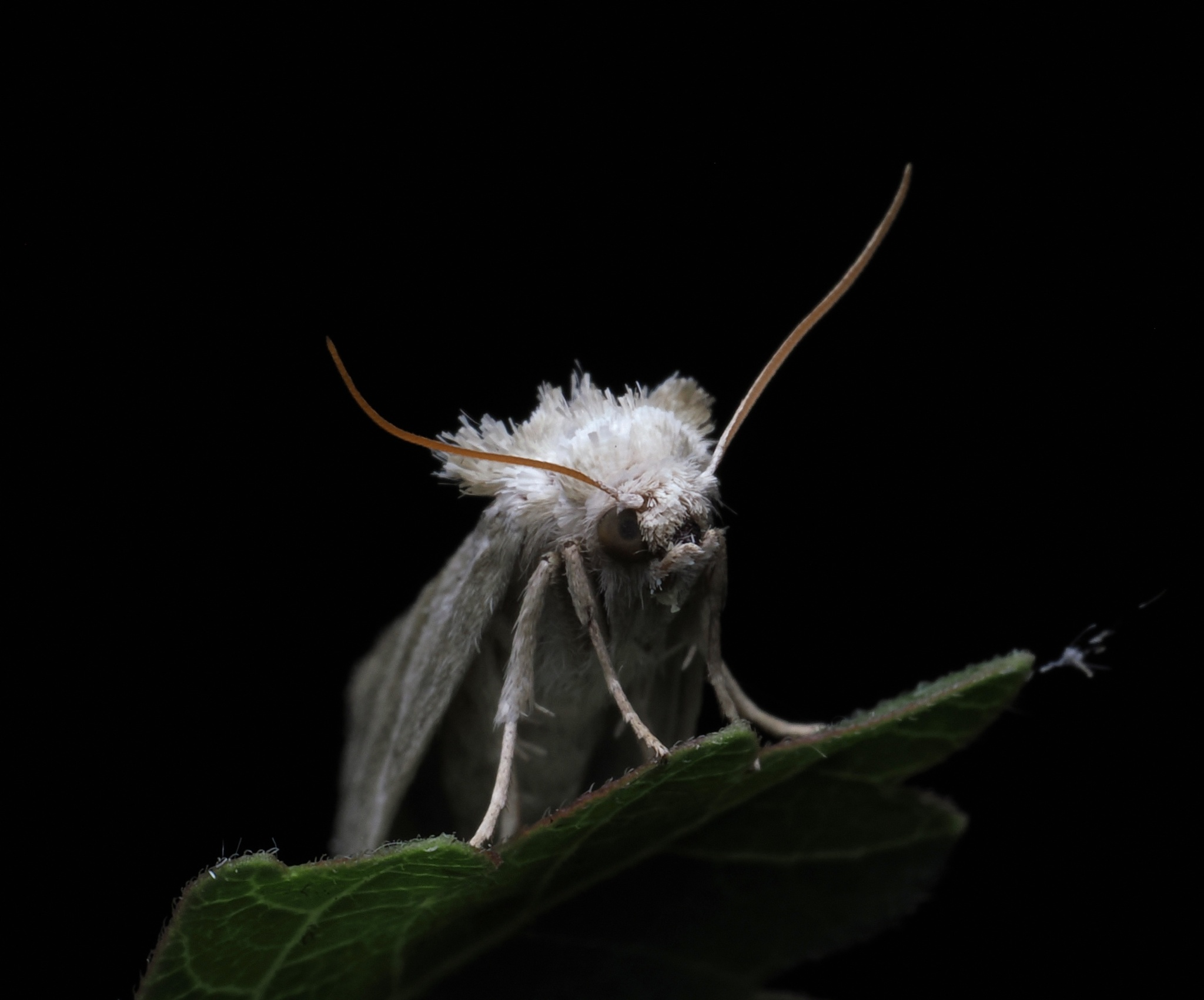
Polenta tepperi from Rock Creek, Colorado Springs, CO, USA
