= Lineostriastiria biundulalis =

Scientific classification
- Kingdom: Animalia
- Phylum: Arthropoda
- Clade: Pancrustacea
- Class: Insecta
- Order: Lepidoptera
- Superfamily: Noctuoidea
- Family: Noctuidae
- Genus: Lineostriastiria
- Species: L. biundulalis

Binomial name
- Lineostriastiria biundulalis (Zeller, 1872)

Synonyms
- Sedenia biundulalis Zeller, 1872; Cavifrons biundulalis; Polenta biundulalis; Plagiomimicus biundulalis

Species of moth

Lineostriastiria biundulalis is a moth of the family Noctuidae. It is found in North America, where it has been recorded from Arizona, Oklahoma and Texas.

The wingspan is about 24 mm. Adults have been recorded on wing in May and from September to October in two generations per year.
