= Lineostriastiria hachita =

Scientific classification
- Kingdom: Animalia
- Phylum: Arthropoda
- Clade: Pancrustacea
- Class: Insecta
- Order: Lepidoptera
- Superfamily: Noctuoidea
- Family: Noctuidae
- Genus: Lineostriastiria
- Species: L. hachita

Binomial name
- Lineostriastiria hachita (Barnes, 1904)

Species of moth

Lineostriastiria hachita is a species of moth in the family Noctuidae (the owlet moths). It was described by William Barnes in 1904 and is found in North America.
