= Lineostriastiria sexseriata =

Scientific classification
- Kingdom: Animalia
- Phylum: Arthropoda
- Clade: Pancrustacea
- Class: Insecta
- Order: Lepidoptera
- Superfamily: Noctuoidea
- Family: Noctuidae
- Genus: Lineostriastiria
- Species: L. sexseriata

Binomial name
- Lineostriastiria sexseriata (Grote, 1881)

Species of moth

Lineostriastiria sexseriata is a species of moth in the family Noctuidae (the owlet moths).
