= Lineostriastiria olivalis =

Scientific classification
- Kingdom: Animalia
- Phylum: Arthropoda
- Clade: Pancrustacea
- Class: Insecta
- Order: Lepidoptera
- Superfamily: Noctuoidea
- Family: Noctuidae
- Genus: Lineostriastiria
- Species: L. olivalis

Binomial name
- Lineostriastiria olivalis (Barnes & McDunnough, 1916)

Species of moth

Lineostriastiria olivalis is a species of moth in the family Noctuidae (the owlet moths). It was first described by William Barnes and James Halliday McDunnough in 1916 and it is found in North America.
