= Lineostriastiria hutsoni =

Scientific classification
- Kingdom: Animalia
- Phylum: Arthropoda
- Clade: Pancrustacea
- Class: Insecta
- Order: Lepidoptera
- Superfamily: Noctuoidea
- Family: Noctuidae
- Subfamily: Stiriinae
- Tribe: Stiriini
- Genus: Lineostriastiria
- Species: L. hutsoni

Binomial name
- Lineostriastiria hutsoni (Smith, 1907)

Species of moth

Lineostriastiria hutsoni is a species of moth in the family Noctuidae (the owlet moths). It is found in North America.
