= Lineostriastiria =

Scientific classification
- Domain: Eukaryota
- Kingdom: Animalia
- Phylum: Arthropoda
- Class: Insecta
- Order: Lepidoptera
- Superfamily: Noctuoidea
- Family: Noctuidae
- Subfamily: Stiriinae
- Tribe: Stiriini
- Genus: Lineostriastiria; Poole, 1995

Genus of moths

Lineostriastiria is a genus of moths of the family Noctuidae.

== Species ==
- Lineostriastiria biundulalis (Zeller, 1872)
- Lineostriastiria hachita (Barnes, 1904)
- Lineostriastiria hutsoni (J.B. Smith, 1907)
- Lineostriastiria olivalis (Barnes & McDunnough, 1916)
- Lineostriastiria sexseriata (Grote, 1881)
