= Speocropia =

Scientific classification
- Kingdom: Animalia
- Phylum: Arthropoda
- Class: Insecta
- Order: Lepidoptera
- Superfamily: Noctuoidea
- Family: Noctuidae
- Subfamily: Noctuinae
- Tribe: incertae sedis
- Genus: Speocropia; Hampson, 1908

Genus of moths

Speocropia is a genus of moths of the family Noctuidae.

== Species ==
- Speocropia aenyra (Druce, 1890)
- Speocropia chromatica Hampson, 1908
- Speocropia leucosticta Hampson, 1908
- Speocropia mamestroides E. D. Jones, 1914
- Speocropia randa (Schaus, 1906)
- Speocropia scriptura (Walker, 1858)
- Speocropia trichroma (Herrich-Schäffer, 1868)

== Former species ==
- Speocropia fernae is now Phosphila fernae (Benjamin, 1933)
