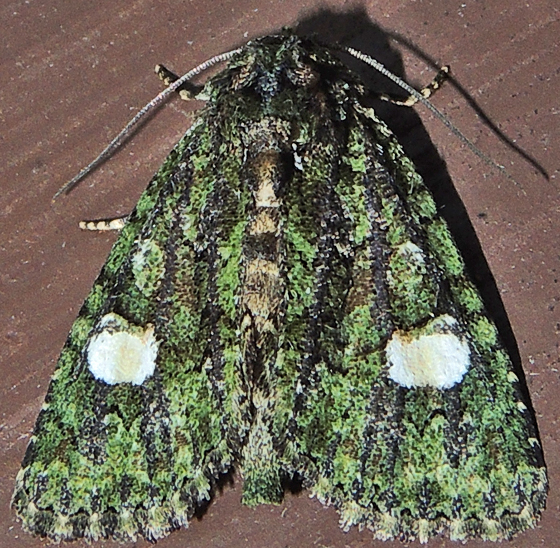
- Phosphila miselioides

Scientific classification
- Kingdom: Animalia
- Phylum: Arthropoda
- Clade: Pancrustacea
- Class: Insecta
- Order: Lepidoptera
- Superfamily: Noctuoidea
- Family: Noctuidae
- Tribe: Phosphilini
- Genus: Phosphila; Hübner, 1818

= Phosphila =

Genus of moths

Phosphila is a genus of moths of the family Noctuidae.

== Species ==
- Phosphila cinerea (Sepp, [1829])
- Phosphila dogmatica (Dyar, 1916)
- Phosphila fernae (Benjamin, 1933)
- Phosphila lacruma (Schaus, 1894)
- Phosphila miselioides (Guenée, 1852)
- Phosphila turbulenta Hübner, 1818
- Phosphila ursipes Hübner, 1823
- Phosphila xylophila (Walker, 1858)
