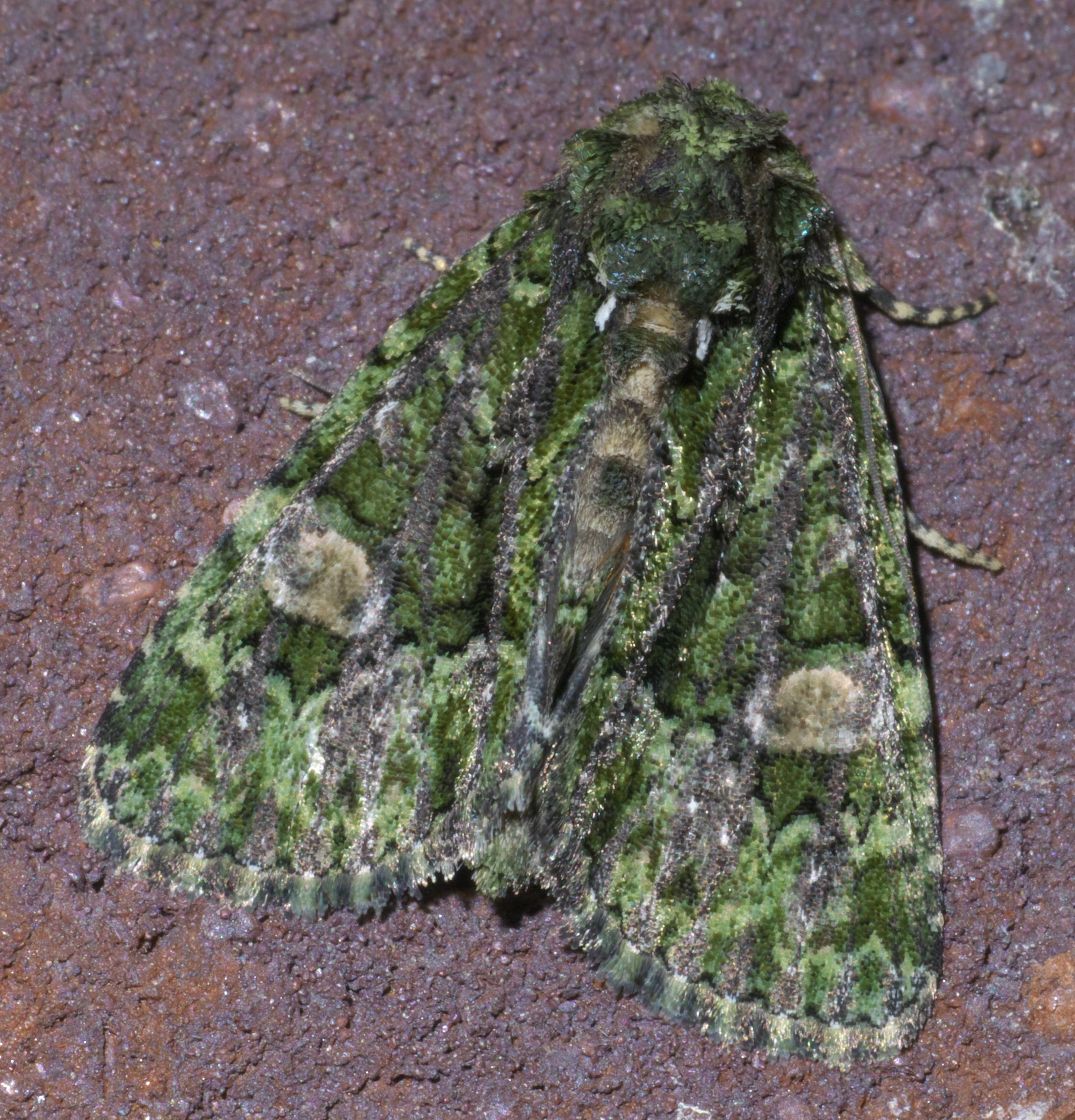

Scientific classification
- Kingdom: Animalia
- Phylum: Arthropoda
- Class: Insecta
- Order: Lepidoptera
- Superfamily: Noctuoidea
- Family: Noctuidae
- Genus: Phosphila
- Species: P. miselioides

Binomial name
- Phosphila miselioides (Guenee, 1852)

= Phosphila miselioides =

Species of moth

Phosphila miselioides, the spotted phosphila, is a species of cutworm or dart moth in the family Noctuidae. It was described by Achille Guenée in 1852 and is found in North America.

The MONA or Hodges number for Phosphila miselioides is 9619.

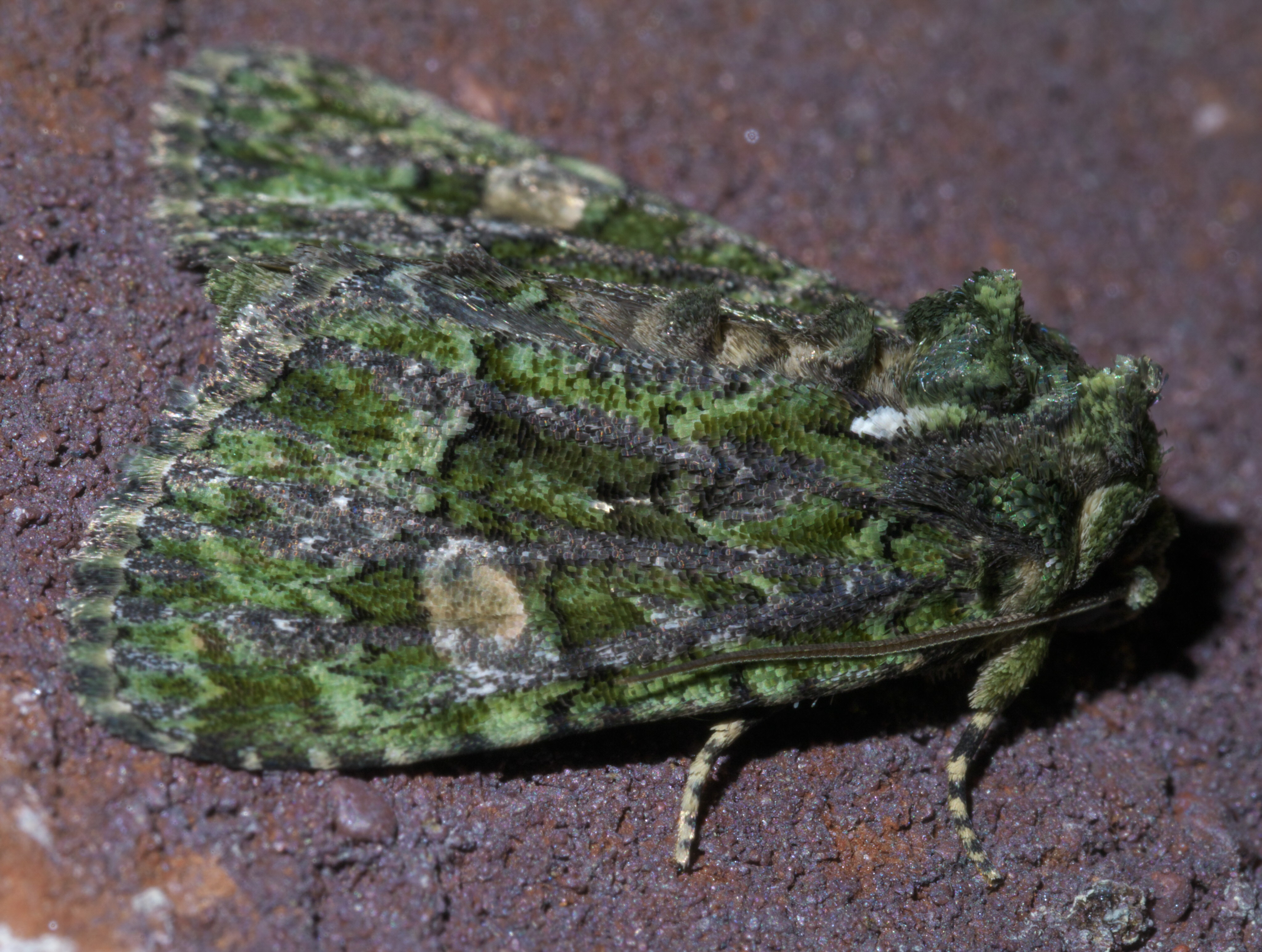
Spotted Phosphila (Hodges #9619), Phosphila miselioides, Pryor, OK, USA
