= Speocropia trichroma =

Scientific classification
- Domain: Eukaryota
- Kingdom: Animalia
- Phylum: Arthropoda
- Class: Insecta
- Order: Lepidoptera
- Superfamily: Noctuoidea
- Family: Noctuidae
- Genus: Speocropia
- Species: S. trichroma

Binomial name
- Speocropia trichroma (Herrich-Schäffer, 1868)

Synonyms
- Hadena trichroma Herrich-Schäffer, 1868; Speocropia trachoma

Species of moth

Speocropia trichroma is a moth of the family Noctuidae first described by Gottlieb August Wilhelm Herrich-Schäffer in 1868. It is found in Florida and on Cuba.

The wingspan is about 30 mm.
