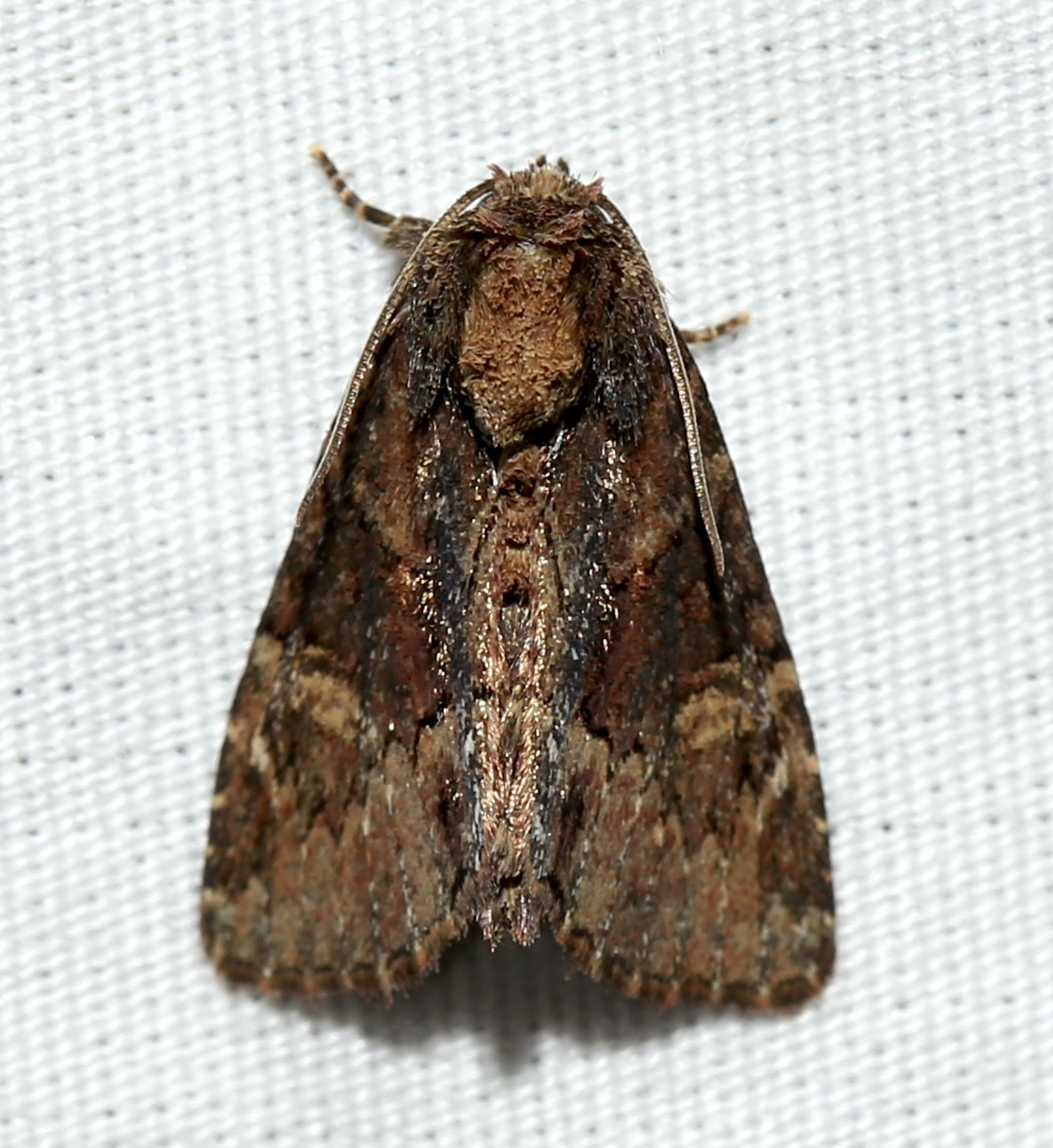
- Adult
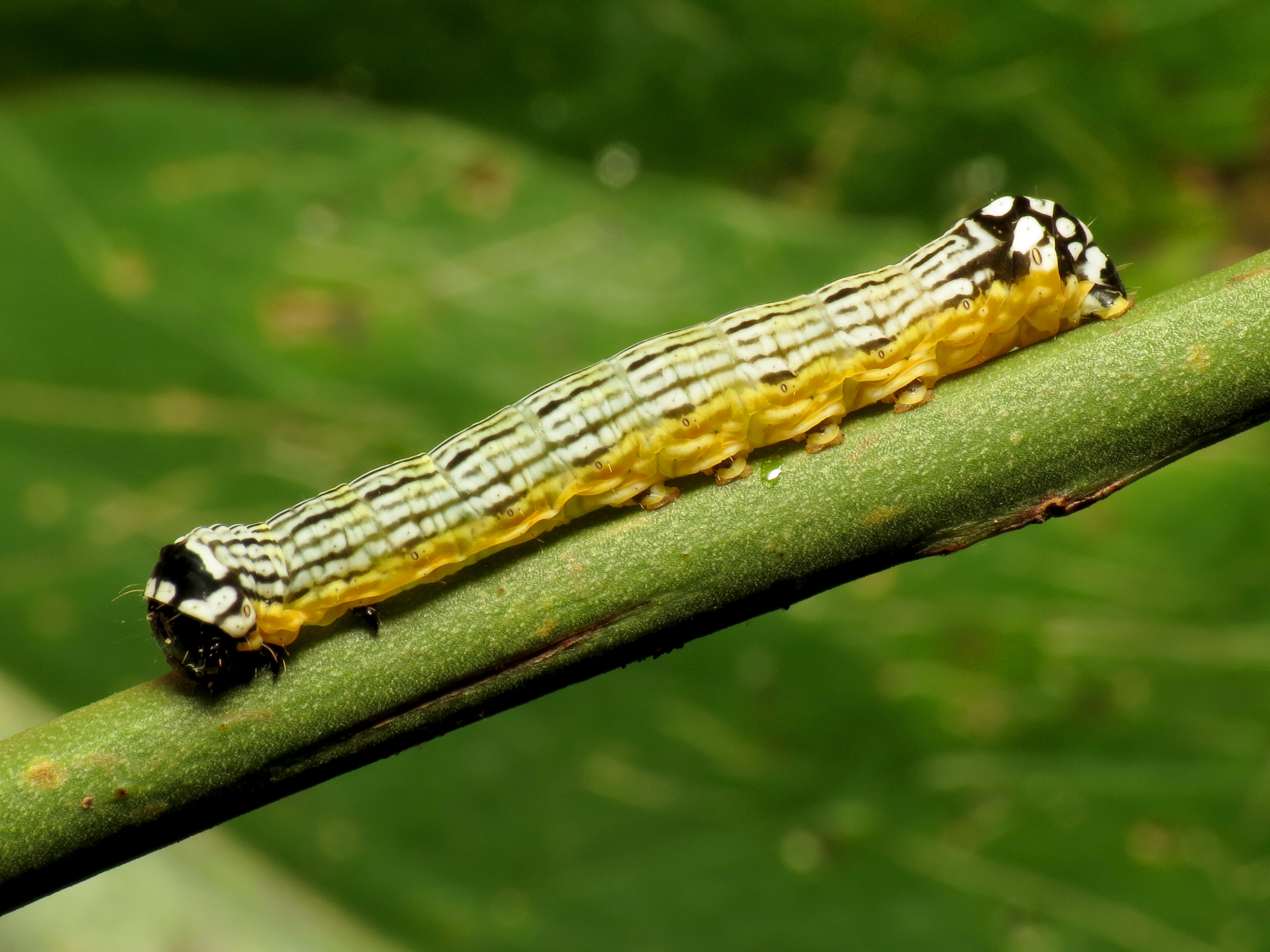
- Larva

Scientific classification
- Kingdom: Animalia
- Phylum: Arthropoda
- Clade: Pancrustacea
- Class: Insecta
- Order: Lepidoptera
- Superfamily: Noctuoidea
- Family: Noctuidae
- Genus: Phosphila
- Species: P. turbulenta

Binomial name
- Phosphila turbulenta Hübner, 1818

= Phosphila turbulenta =

Species of moth

Phosphila turbulenta, the turbulent phosphila, is a species of cutworm or dart moth in the family Noctuidae. It is found in North America.
