= Phosphila fernae =

Scientific classification
- Kingdom: Animalia
- Phylum: Arthropoda
- Clade: Pancrustacea
- Class: Insecta
- Order: Lepidoptera
- Superfamily: Noctuoidea
- Family: Noctuidae
- Tribe: Phosphilini
- Genus: Phosphila
- Species: P. fernae

Binomial name
- Phosphila fernae (Benjamin, 1933)

Species of moth

Phosphila fernae is a species of cutworm or dart moth in the family Noctuidae.
