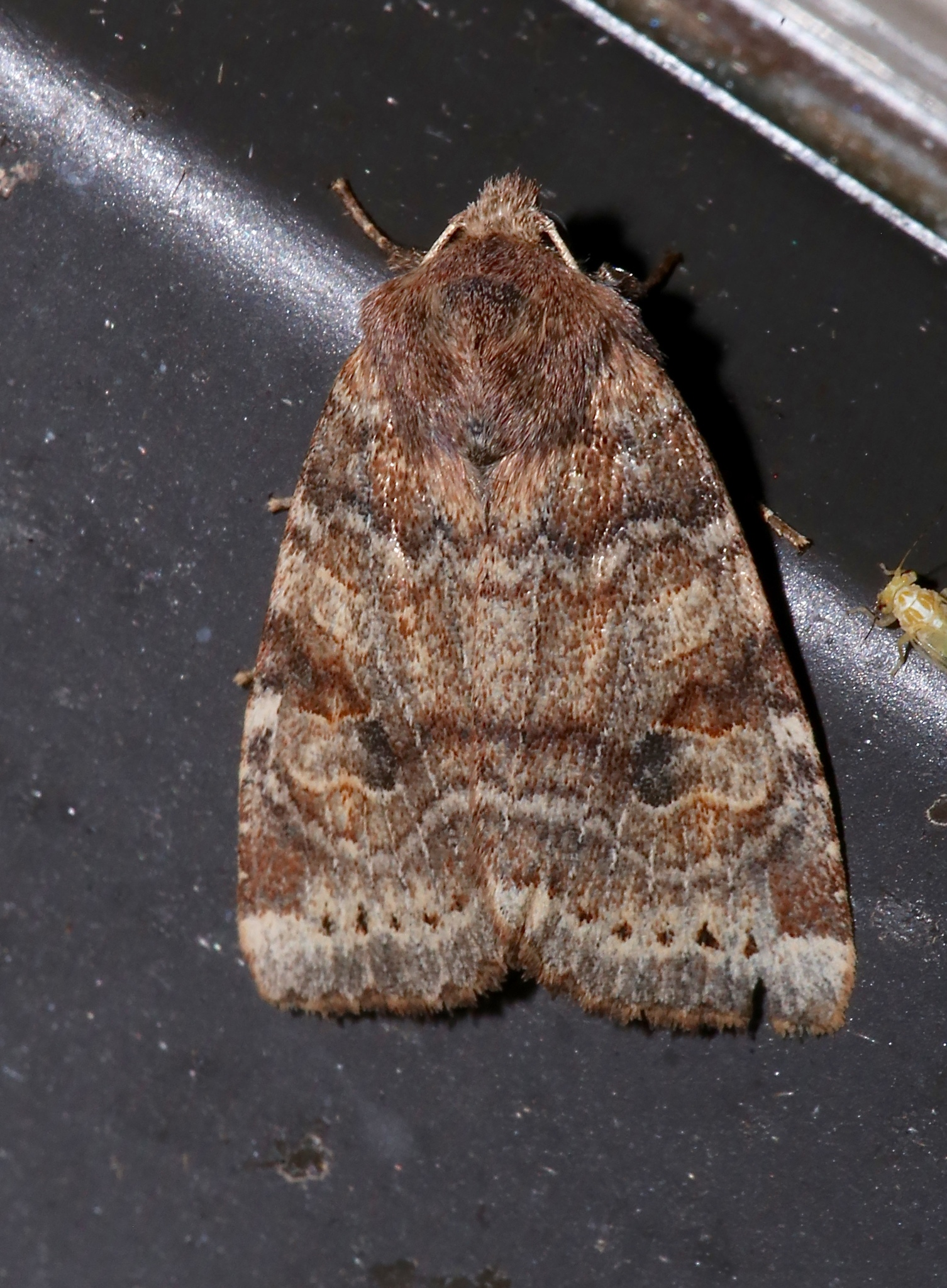
- Anathix puta

Scientific classification
- Kingdom: Animalia
- Phylum: Arthropoda
- Clade: Pancrustacea
- Class: Insecta
- Order: Lepidoptera
- Superfamily: Noctuoidea
- Family: Noctuidae
- Subtribe: Xylenina
- Genus: Anathix; Franclemont, 1937

= Anathix =

Genus of moths

Anathix is a genus of moths of the family Noctuidae.

== Species ==
- Anathix aggressa (Smith, 1907)
- Anathix immaculata (Morrison, 1875)
- Anathix puta (Grote & Robinson, 1868)
- Anathix ralla (Grote & Robinson, 1868)
