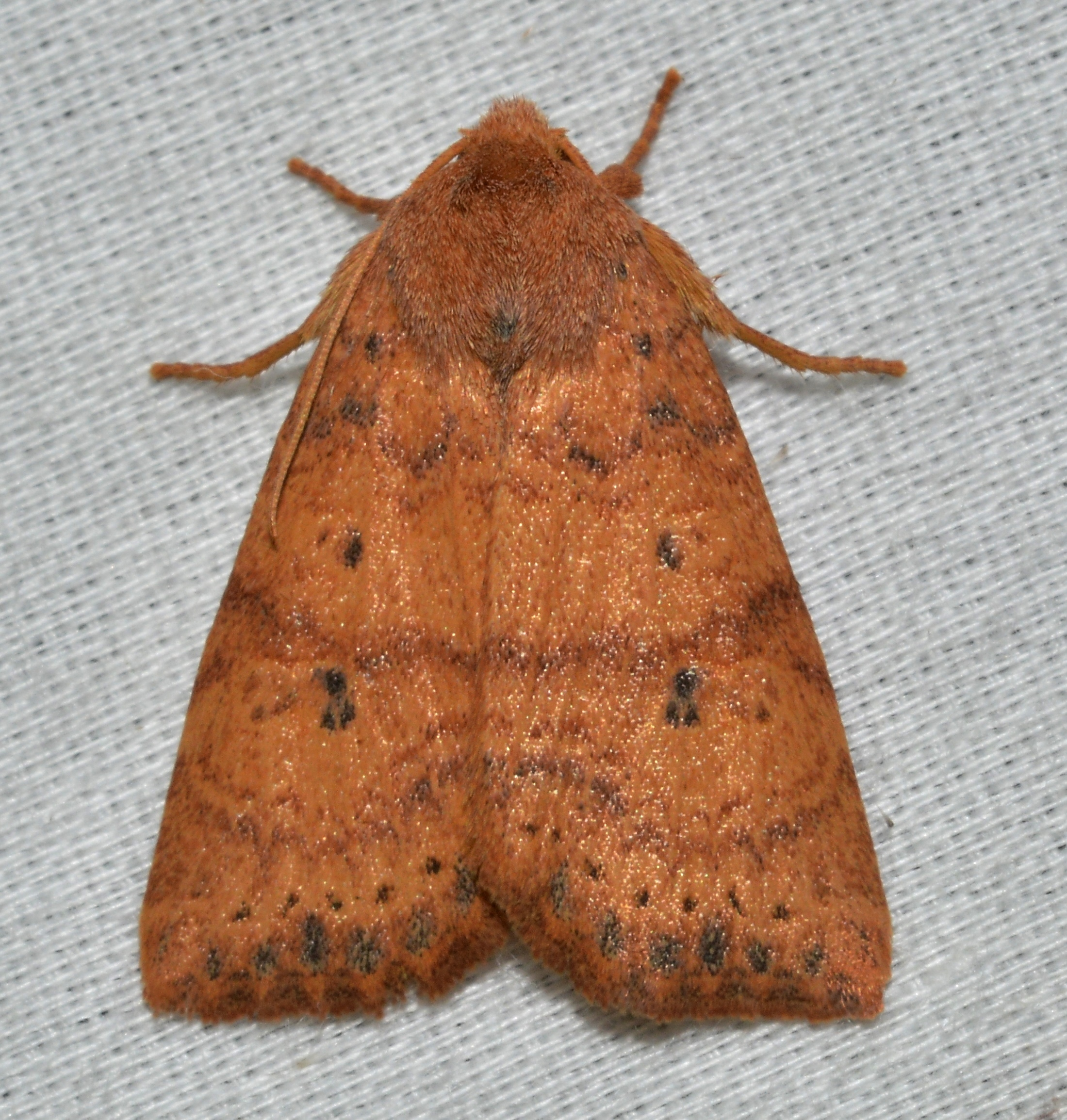

Scientific classification
- Kingdom: Animalia
- Phylum: Arthropoda
- Class: Insecta
- Order: Lepidoptera
- Superfamily: Noctuoidea
- Family: Noctuidae
- Tribe: Xylenini
- Subtribe: Xylenina
- Genus: Anathix
- Species: A. ralla

Binomial name
- Anathix ralla (Grote & Robinson, 1868)

= Anathix ralla =

Species of moth

Anathix ralla, the dotted sallow moth, is a species of cutworm or dart moth in the family Noctuidae. It is found in North America.

The MONA or Hodges number for Anathix ralla is 9961.
