= Anathix aggressa =

Scientific classification
- Domain: Eukaryota
- Kingdom: Animalia
- Phylum: Arthropoda
- Class: Insecta
- Order: Lepidoptera
- Superfamily: Noctuoidea
- Family: Noctuidae
- Tribe: Xylenini
- Subtribe: Xylenina
- Genus: Anathix
- Species: A. aggressa

Binomial name
- Anathix aggressa (Smith, 1907)

Species of moth

Anathix aggressa is a species of cutworm or dart moth in the family Noctuidae. It is found in North America.

The MONA or Hodges number for Anathix aggressa is 9963.
