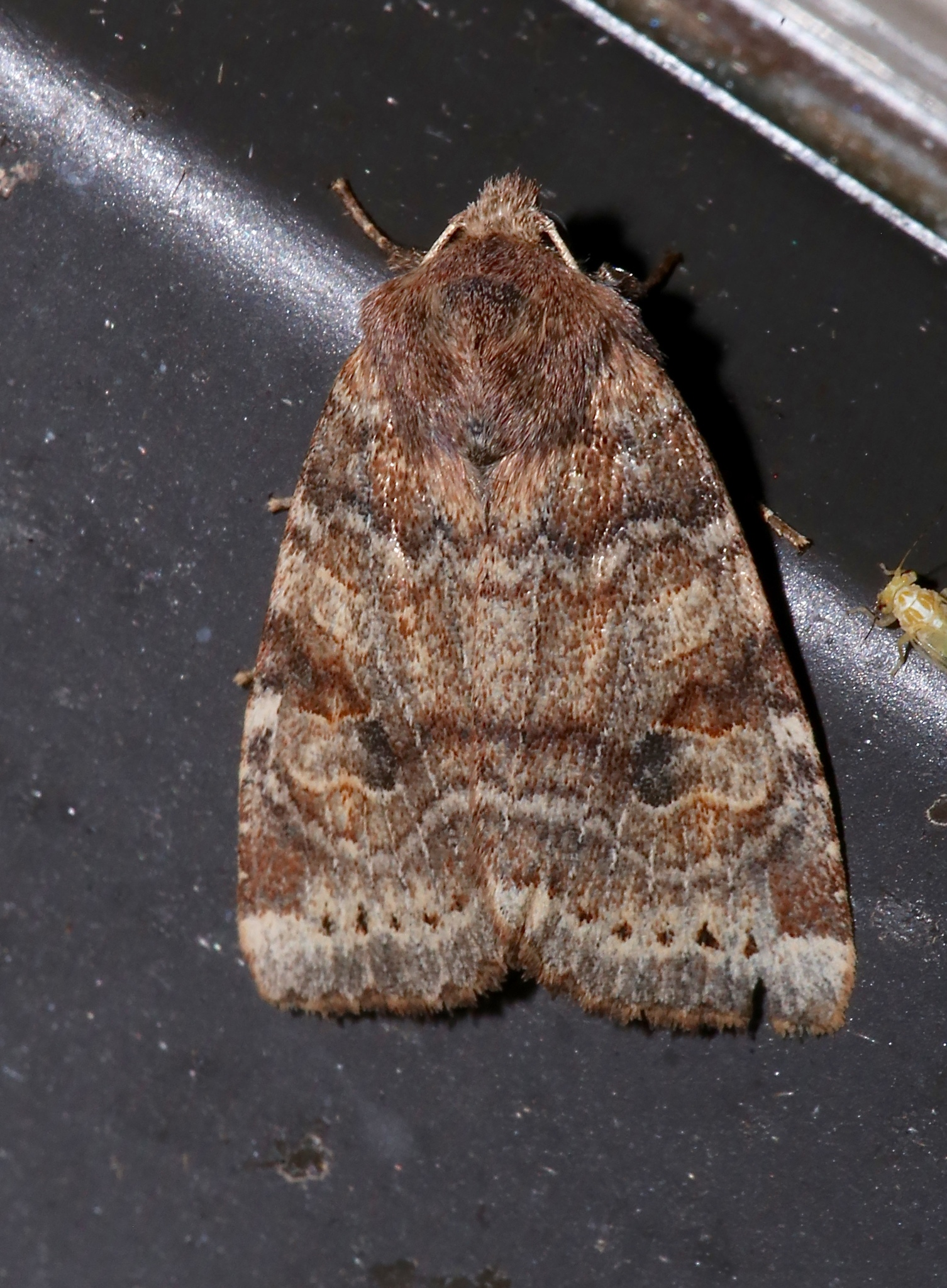

Scientific classification
- Kingdom: Animalia
- Phylum: Arthropoda
- Class: Insecta
- Order: Lepidoptera
- Superfamily: Noctuoidea
- Family: Noctuidae
- Tribe: Xylenini
- Subtribe: Xylenina
- Genus: Anathix
- Species: A. puta

Binomial name
- Anathix puta (Grote & Robinson, 1868)

= Anathix puta =

Species of moth

Anathix puta, known generally as the puta sallow moth or poplar catkin moth, is a species of cutworm or dart moth in the family Noctuidae. It is found in North America.

The MONA or Hodges number for Anathix puta is 9962.
