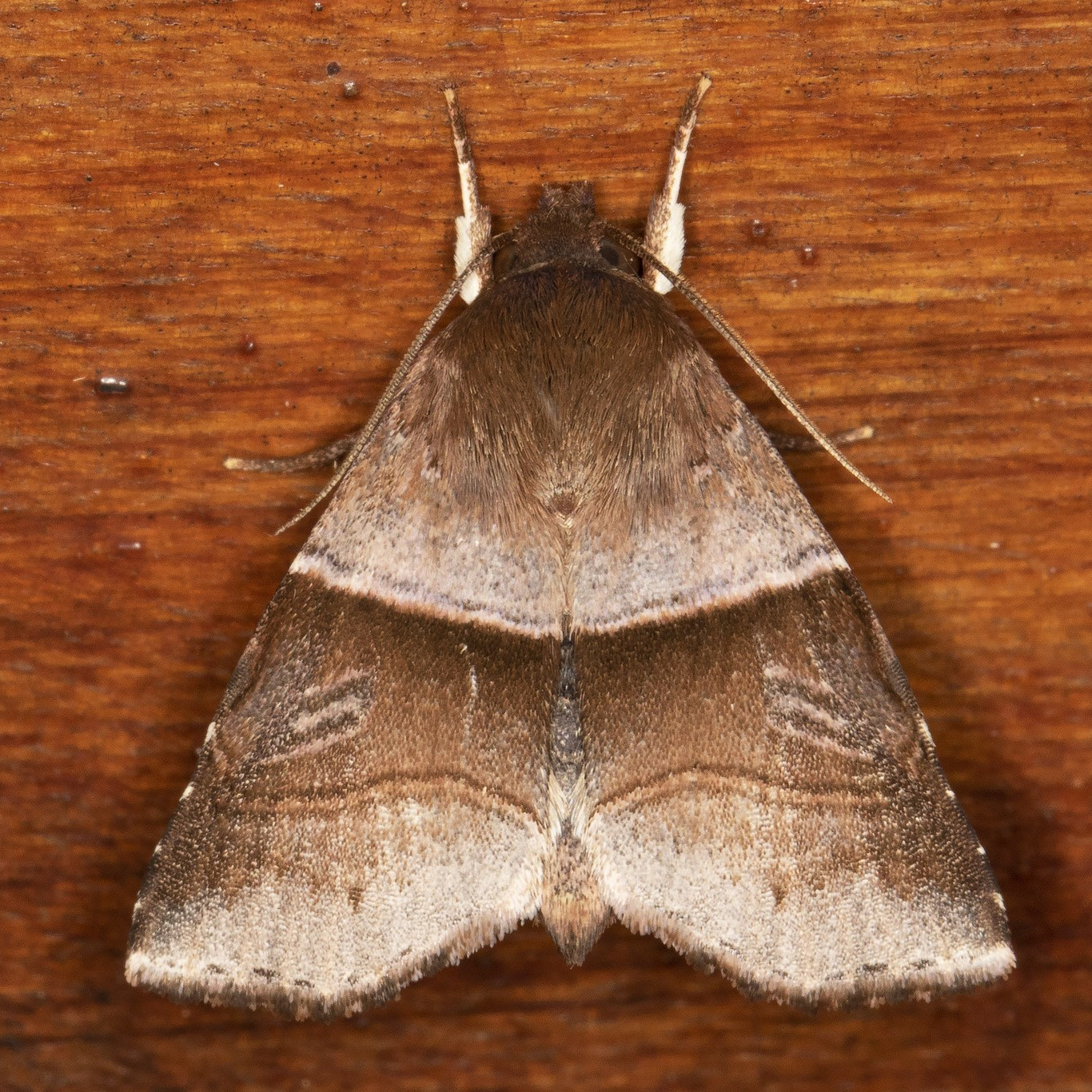
- Phuphena transversa

Scientific classification
- Kingdom: Animalia
- Phylum: Arthropoda
- Clade: Pancrustacea
- Class: Insecta
- Order: Lepidoptera
- Superfamily: Noctuoidea
- Family: Noctuidae
- Tribe: Phosphilini
- Genus: Phuphena; Walker, 1858

= Phuphena =

Genus of moths of the family Noctuidae

Phuphena is a genus of moths of the family Noctuidae.

== Species ==
- Phuphena cilix (Druce, 1898)
- Phuphena constricta Dognin, 1912
- Phuphena costata Schaus, 1914
- Phuphena diagona Hampson, 1908
- Phuphena fusipennis Walker, 1858
- Phuphena multilinea Schaus, 1911
- Phuphena parallela (Hampson, 1904)
- Phuphena petrovna (Schaus, 1904)
- Phuphena proseluta Schaus, 1921
- Phuphena subvenata Schaus, 1914
- Phuphena transversa (Schaus, 1894)
- Phuphena tura (Druce, 1889) (syn: Phuphena obliqua (Smith, 1900))
- Phuphena zelotypa Schaus, 1911
