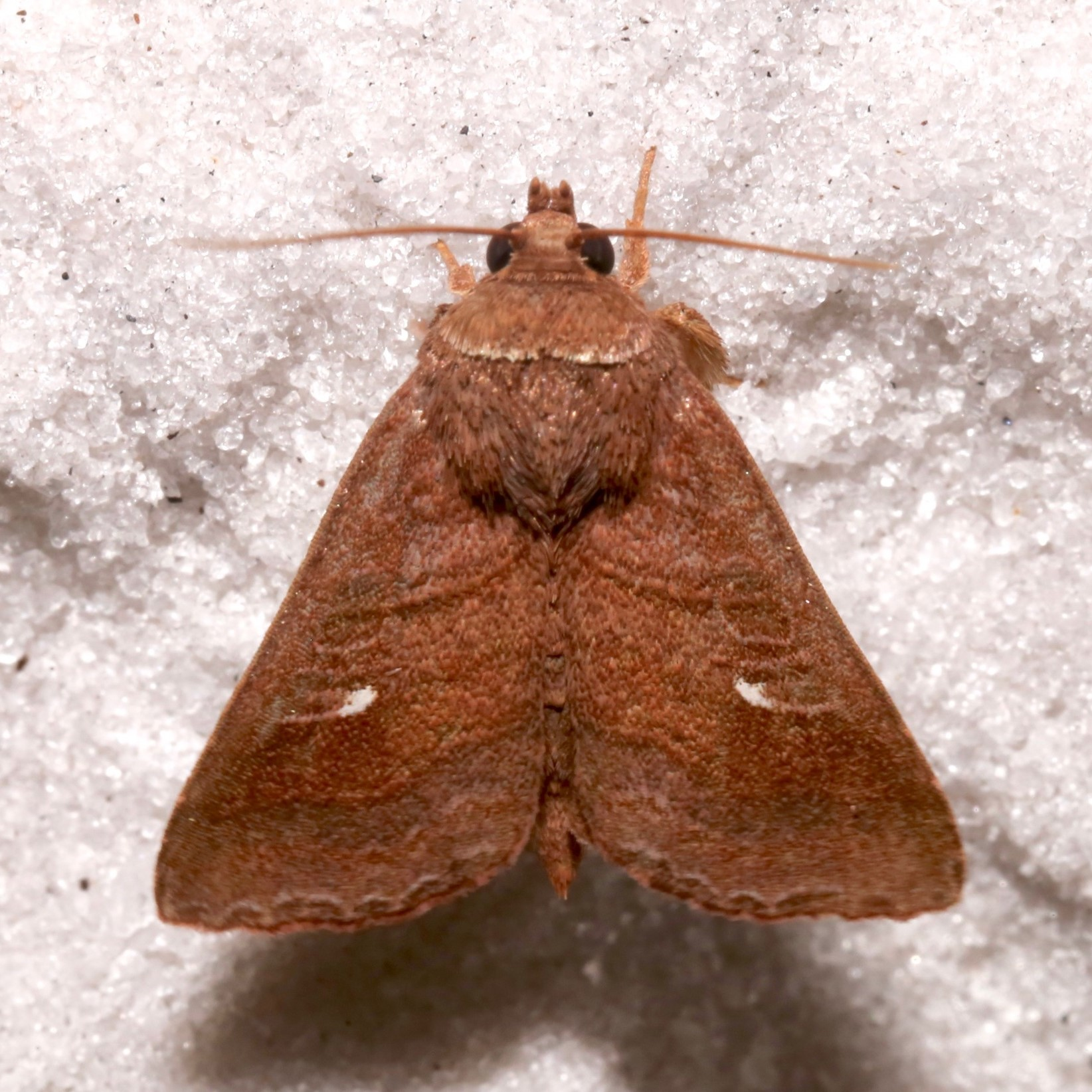

Scientific classification
- Kingdom: Animalia
- Phylum: Arthropoda
- Clade: Pancrustacea
- Class: Insecta
- Order: Lepidoptera
- Superfamily: Noctuoidea
- Family: Noctuidae
- Tribe: Phosphilini
- Genus: Phuphena
- Species: P. tura

Binomial name
- Phuphena tura (Druce, 1889)

Synonyms
- Phuphena obliqua (Smith, 1900)

= Phuphena tura =

Species of moth

Phuphena tura is a species of cutworm or dart moth in the family Noctuidae. It is found in North America.
