= Coenipeta =

Scientific classification
- Kingdom: Animalia
- Phylum: Arthropoda
- Clade: Pancrustacea
- Class: Insecta
- Order: Lepidoptera
- Superfamily: Noctuoidea
- Family: Erebidae
- Tribe: Omopterini
- Genus: Coenipeta; Hübner, 1818

Synonyms
- Acolasis Hübner, [1821]; Anthocitta Hübner, [1823]; Eudipna Walker, 1856; Hypogramma Guenée, 1852

Genus of moths

Coenipeta is a genus of moths in the family Erebidae.

== Species ==
- Coenipeta bibitrix Hübner, 1823
- Coenipeta colliquens Hübner, 1818
- Coenipeta medina Guenée, 1852
- Coenipeta tanais (Cramer, 1775)
