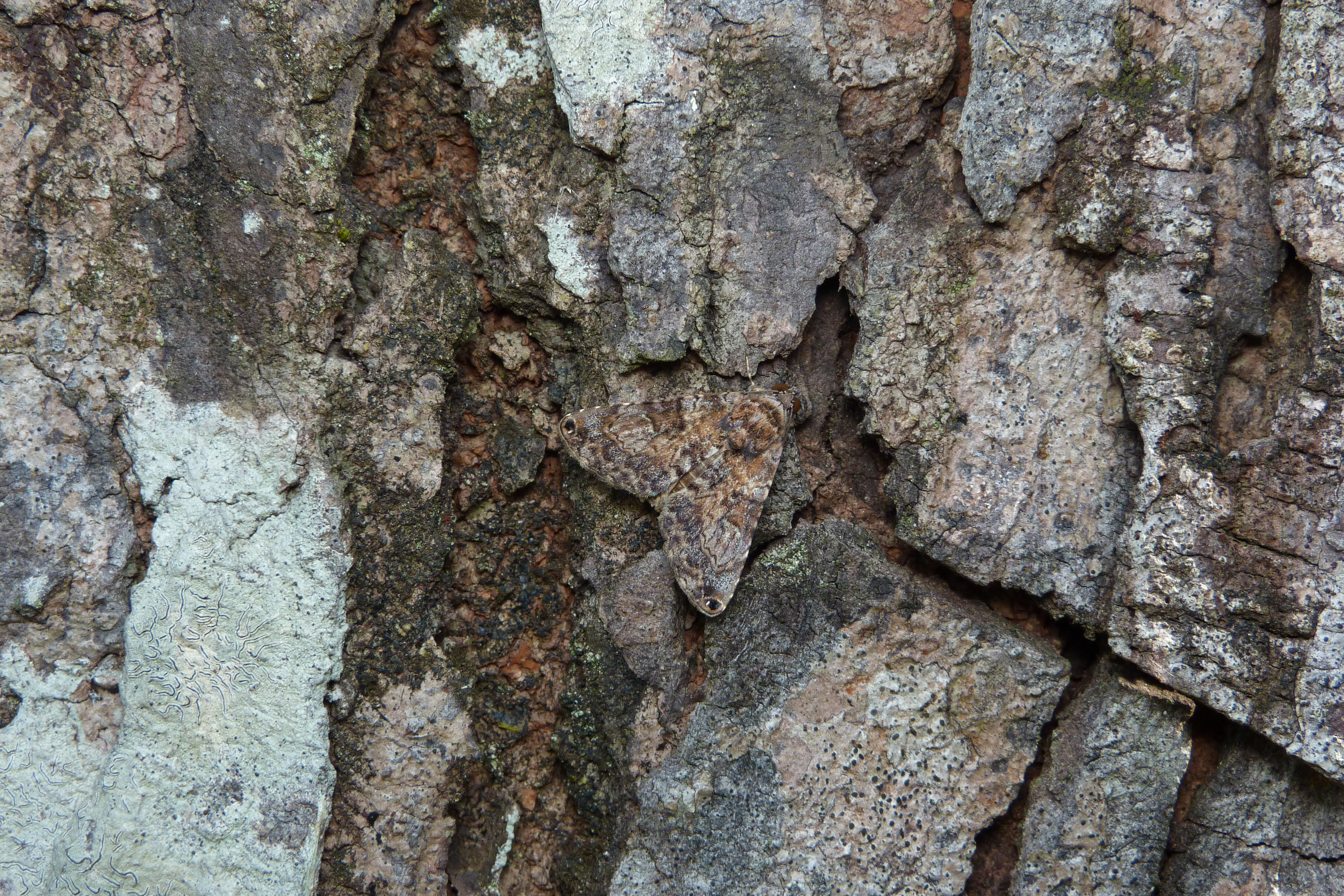

Scientific classification
- Kingdom: Animalia
- Phylum: Arthropoda
- Clade: Pancrustacea
- Class: Insecta
- Order: Lepidoptera
- Superfamily: Noctuoidea
- Family: Erebidae
- Genus: Coenipeta
- Species: C. bibitrix

Binomial name
- Coenipeta bibitrix (Hübner, 1823)

Synonyms
- Helia bibitrix Hubner, 1823; Eubolina meskei Edwards, 1882; Coenipeta glaucescens Walker, 1866

= Coenipeta bibitrix =

Species of moth

Coenipeta bibitrix is a genus of moths in the family Erebidae. The species is found from southern Florida and southern Texas, south to northern South America.

== Description ==
The wingspan of *Coenipeta bibitrix* is about 30 mm. The moths have distinctive wing patterns and coloration that help in their identification.

== Distribution ==
- Coenipeta bibitrix* is distributed across a range that includes southern Florida and southern Texas in the United States, and extends southward to northern South America. This wide range indicates the species' adaptability to various tropical and subtropical habitats.

== Habitat ==
The species typically inhabits areas that provide suitable conditions for feeding and reproduction. This includes tropical and subtropical forests, as well as other areas where host plants are abundant.

== Behavior and ecology ==
The moths of this species are primarily nocturnal, like most members of the family Erebidae. They are attracted to light, which is a common behavior observed in many moth species.
