= Coenipeta medina =

Scientific classification
- Kingdom: Animalia
- Phylum: Arthropoda
- Class: Insecta
- Order: Lepidoptera
- Superfamily: Noctuoidea
- Family: Erebidae
- Genus: Coenipeta
- Species: C. medina

Binomial name
- Coenipeta medina Guenée, 1852

Synonyms
- Coenipeta celadon Herrich-Schäffer, 1869; Coenipeta saxosa Walker, 1858

Species of moth

Coenipeta medina is a species of moth in the family Erebidae first described by Achille Guenée in 1852. The species is found from Texas through Central America and Cuba to Brazil.
