= Capis curvata =

Scientific classification
- Kingdom: Animalia
- Phylum: Arthropoda
- Class: Insecta
- Order: Lepidoptera
- Superfamily: Noctuoidea
- Family: Erebidae
- Genus: Capis
- Species: C. curvata

Binomial name
- Capis curvata Grote, 1882

Species of moth

Capis curvata, known generally as the curved halter moth or bog capis moth, is a species of moth in the family Noctuidae (the owlet moths). It is found in North America.

The MONA or Hodges number for Capis curvata is 9059.
