= Capis =

Scientific classification
- Kingdom: Animalia
- Phylum: Arthropoda
- Class: Insecta
- Order: Lepidoptera
- Superfamily: Noctuoidea
- Family: Erebidae
- Subfamily: Calpinae
- Genus: Capis; Grote, 1882

Genus of moths

Capis is a genus of moths of the family Noctuidae.

== Species ==
- Capis archaia L. Handfield & D. Handfield, 2006
- Capis curvata Grote, 1882
