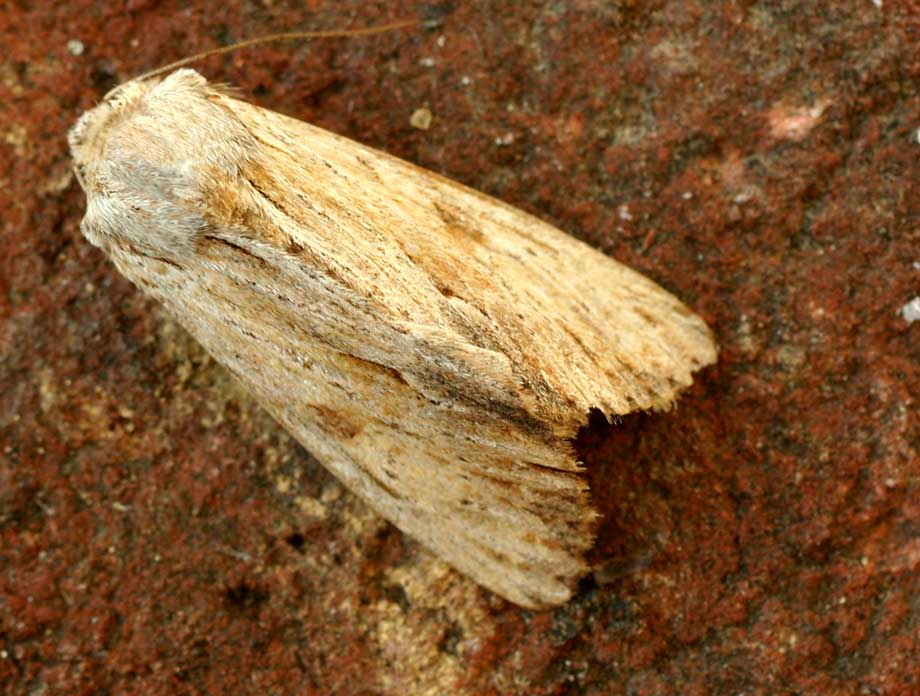
- Apamea lithoxylaea

Scientific classification
- Domain: Eukaryota
- Kingdom: Animalia
- Phylum: Arthropoda
- Class: Insecta
- Order: Lepidoptera
- Superfamily: Noctuoidea
- Family: Noctuidae
- Subfamily: Noctuinae
- Tribe: Apameini
- Genus: Apamea; Ochsenheimer, 1816

Synonyms
- Abromias Billberg, 1820; Agroperina Hampson, 1908; Agrostobia Boie, 1835; Crymodes Guenée, 1841; Dimya Moore, 1882; Eleemosia Prout, 1901; Eurabila Butler, 1889; Hama Stephens, 1829; Heteromma Warren, 1911; Heterommiola Strand, 1912; Ommatostola Grote, 1873; Protagrotis Hampson, 1903; Septis Hübner, 1821; Syma Stephens, 1850; Trichoplexia Hampson, 1908; Xylophasia Stephens, 1829

= Apamea (moth) =

Genus of moths

Apamea is a genus of moths in the family Noctuidae first described by Ferdinand Ochsenheimer in 1816.

Some Apamea species are pest insects. The larval Apamea niveivenosa is a cutworm known as a pest of grain crops in North America. The larva of A. apamiformis is the rice worm, the most serious insect pest of cultivated wild rice in the Upper Midwest of the United States.

== Selected species ==
- Apamea acera (Smith, 1900)
- Apamea albina (Grote, 1874)
- Apamea alia (Guenée, 1852)
- Apamea alpigena (Boisduval, [1837])
- Apamea alticola (Smith, 1891)
- Apamea altijuga (Kozhantshikov, 1925)
- Apamea amputatrix (Fitch, 1857) – yellow-headed cutworm
- Apamea anceps (Denis & Schiffermüller, 1775) – large nutmeg
- Apamea antennata (Smith, 1891)
- Apamea apamiformis (Guenée, 1852) – rice worm, wild rice worm
- Apamea aquila Donzel, 1837
- Apamea arabs (Oberthür, 1881)
- Apamea assimilis (Doubleday, 1847)
- Apamea atriclava (Barnes & McDunnough, 1913)
- Apamea atrosuffusa (Barnes & McDunnough, 1913) (syn. A. grotei (Barnes & McDunnough, 1914))
- Apamea auranticolor (Grote, 1873)
- Apamea baischi Hacker, 1989
- Apamea barbara (Berio, 1940)
- Apamea basimacula Boisduval, 1833
- Apamea bernardino Mikkola & Mustelin 2000
- Apamea boopis (Hampson, 1908)
- Apamea brunnea (Leech, 1900)
- Apamea brunnescens Kononenko, 1985
- Apamea burgessi (Morrison, 1874)
- Apamea caesia Hreblay & Ronkay, 1998
- Apamea cariosa (Guenée, 1852) – nondescript dagger moth
- Apamea centralis (Smith, 1891)
- Apamea chalybeata (Walker, 1865)
- Apamea chhiringi Hreblay, 1998
- Apamea chinensis (Leech, 1900)
- Apamea cinefacta (Grote, 1881)
- Apamea cogitata (Smith, 1891) – thoughtful apamea
- Apamea commixta (Butler, 1881)
- Apamea commoda (Walker, 1857) – southern Quaker
  - Apamea commoda commoda (Walker, 1857)
  - Apamea commoda parcata (Smith, 1903)
  - Apamea commoda striolata Mikkola, 2009
- Apamea concinna (Leech, 1900)
- Apamea contradicta (Smith, 1895) – northern banded Quaker
- Apamea crenata Hufnagel, 1766 – clouded-bordered brindle
- Apamea cristata (Grote, 1878)
- Apamea cuculliformis (Grote, 1875)
- Apamea cyanea (Hampson, 1908)
- Apamea desegaulxi Viette, 1928
- Apamea devastator Brace, 1819 – glassy cutworm
- Apamea digitula Mikkola and Mustelin, 2006
- Apamea dubitans (Walker, 1856) – doubtful apamea
- Apamea epomidion (Haworth, 1809) – clouded brindle
- Apamea erythrographa Hreblay, Peregovits & Ronkay, 1999
- Apamea euxinia Hacker, 1985
- Apamea exstincta (Staudinger, 1892)
- Apamea fasciata (Leech, 1900)
- Apamea fergusoni Mikkola & Lafontaine, 2009
- Apamea ferrago (Eversmann, 1837)
- Apamea fervida (Hampson, 1908)
- Apamea furva (Denis & Schiffermüller, 1775) – the confused
- Apamea gabrieli Mikkola & Mustelin 2000
- Apamea ganeshi Hreblay, 1998
- Apamea gangtoki Hreblay & Ronkay, 1998
- Apamea geminimacula (Dyar, 1904)
- Apamea genialis (Grote, 1874)
- Apamea glenura (Swinhoe, 1895)
- Apamea glenurina Hreblay & Ronkay, 1999
- Apamea goateri Hacker, 2001
- Apamea goperma Hreblay & Ronkay, 1999
- Apamea gratissima Hreblay & Ronkay, 1999
- Apamea griveaudi Viette, 1967
- Apamea groenlandica (Duponchel, [1838])
- Apamea hampsoni Sugi, 1963
- Apamea heinickei Hreblay, 1998
- Apamea helva (Grote, 1875) – yellow three-spot
- Apamea illyria Freyer, 1846
- Apamea impedita (Christoph, 1887)
- Apamea impulsa (Guenée, 1852)
- Apamea indocilis (Walker, 1856) – ignorant apamea
- Apamea inebriata Ferguson, 1977 – drunk apamea
- Apamea inficita (Walker, 1857) – lined Quaker
- Apamea inordinata (Morrison, 1875)
- Apamea kaszabi Varga, 1982
- Apamea kumari Hreblay & Ronkay, 1999
- Apamea lateritia (Hufnagel, 1766) – scarce brindle
- Apamea leucodon (Eversmann, 1837)
- Apamea lieni Hreblay, 1998
- Apamea lignea (Butler, 1889)
- Apamea lignicolora (Guenée, 1852) – wood-coloured Quaker
- Apamea lintneri Grote, 1873
- Apamea lithoxylaea Denis & Schiffermüller, 1775 – light arches
- Apamea longula (Grote, 1879)
- Apamea lutosa (Andrews, 1877) – opalescent apamea
- Apamea lysis (Fawcett, 1917)
- Apamea macronephra Berio, 1959
- Apamea magnirena (Boursin, 1943)
- Apamea maraschi (Draudt, 1934)
- Apamea maroccana (Zerny, 1934)
- Apamea maxima (Dyar, 1904)
- Apamea michielii Varga, 1976
- Apamea mikkolai Hreblay & Ronkay, 1998
- Apamea minnecii (Berio, 1939)
- Apamea minoica (Fibiger, Schmidt & Zilli, 2005)
- Apamea monoglypha Hufnagel, 1766 – dark arches
- Apamea nekrasovi Mikkola, Gyulai & Varga, 1997
- Apamea nigrior (Smith, 1891) – black-dashed apamea, dark apamea
- Apamea nigrostria Hreblay, Peregovits & Ronkay, 1999
- Apamea niveivenosa (Grote, 1879) – snowy-veined apamea
- Apamea nubila Moore, 1881
- Apamea obliviosa (Walker, 1858)
- Apamea oblonga (Haworth, 1809) – crescent striped
- Apamea occidens (Grote, 1878) – western apamea
- Apamea ontakensis Sugi, 1982
- Apamea ophiogramma Esper, 1793 – double lobed
- Apamea pallifera (Grote, 1877)
- Apamea permixta Kononenko, 2006
- Apamea perpensa (Grote, 1881)
- Apamea perstriata (Hampson, 1908)
- Apamea platinea (Treitschke, 1825)
- Apamea plutonia (Grote, 1883) – dusky Quaker, dusky apamea
- Apamea polyglypha (Staudinger, 1892)
- Apamea pseudoaltijuga Grosser, 1985
- Apamea purpurina (Hampson, 1908)
- Apamea quinteri Mikkola & Lafontaine, 2009
- Apamea rectificata Hreblay & Plante, 1995
- Apamea relicina (Morrison, 1875)
  - Apamea relicina relicina (Morrison, 1875)
  - Apamea relicina migrata (Smith, [1904])
- Apamea remissa Hübner, 1809 – dusky brocade
- Apamea reseri Hreblay & Ronkay, 1998
- Apamea robertsoni Mikkola and Mustelin, 2006
- Apamea roedereri Viette, 1976
- Apamea rubrirena (Treitschke, 1825)
- Apamea rufa (Draudt, 1950)
- Apamea rufomedialis (Marumo, 1920)
- Apamea rufus (Chang, 1991)
- Apamea sanyibaglya Hreblay & Ronkay, 1998
- Apamea schawerdae (Draeseke, 1928)
- Apamea scolopacina (Esper, 1788) – slender brindle
- Apamea scoparia Mikkola, Mustelin & Lafontaine, 2000
- Apamea shibuyoides Poole, 1989
- Apamea sicula (Turati, 1909)
- Apamea sinuata (Moore, 1882)
- Apamea siskiyou Mikkola & Lafontaine, 2009
- Apamea smythi Franclemont, 1952
- Apamea sodalis (Butler, 1878)
- Apamea sora (Smith, 1903)
- Apamea sordens Hufnagel, 1766 – rustic shoulder-knot
- Apamea spaldingi (Smith, 1909) – Spalding's Quaker
- Apamea stagmatipennis (Dyar, 1920)
- Apamea striata Haruta & Sugi, 1958
- Apamea sublustris (Esper, [1788]) – reddish light arches
- Apamea submarginata (Leech, 1900)
- Apamea submediana (Draudt, 1950)
- Apamea superba (Turati, 1926)
- Apamea syriaca (Osthelder, 1932)
- Apamea tahoeensis Mikkola & Lafontaine, 2009
- Apamea taiwana (Wileman, 1914)
- Apamea terranea (Butler, 1889)
- Apamea unanimis (Hübner, [1813]) – small clouded brindle
- Apamea unita (Smith, 1904)
- Apamea verbascoides (Guenée, 1852) – boreal apamea, mullein apamea
- Apamea veterina (Lederer, 1853)
- Apamea vicaria (Püngeler, 1902)
- Apamea vulgaris (Grote & Robinson, 1866) – common apamea
- Apamea vultuosa (Grote, 1875) – airy apamea
- Apamea walshi Lafontaine, 2009
- Apamea wasedana Sugi, 1982
- Apamea wikeri Quinter & Lafontaine, 2009
- Apamea xylodes Mikkola & Lafontaine, 2009
- Apamea zeta (Treitschke, 1825)

== Former species ==
- Apamea formosensis is now Leucapamea formosensis (Hampson, 1910)
- Apamea mixta is now Melanapamea mixta (Grote, 1881)
