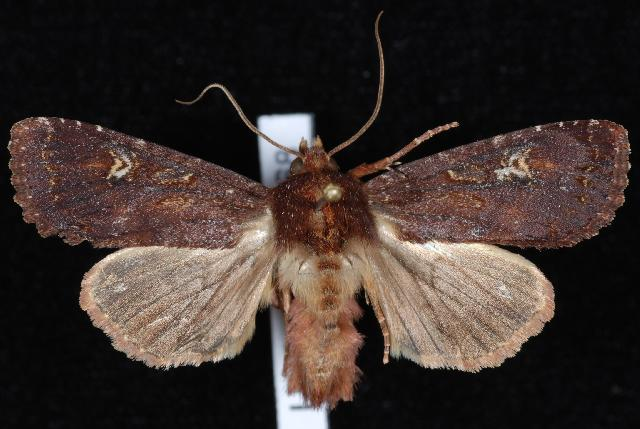

Scientific classification
- Domain: Eukaryota
- Kingdom: Animalia
- Phylum: Arthropoda
- Class: Insecta
- Order: Lepidoptera
- Superfamily: Noctuoidea
- Family: Noctuidae
- Genus: Apamea
- Species: A. cogitata

Binomial name
- Apamea cogitata Smith, 1891

Synonyms
- Apamea dubitans cogitata

= Apamea cogitata =

Thoughtful apamea

Species of moth

Apamea cogitata, the thoughtful apamea, is a moth of the family Noctuidae. It is native to North America, where it can be found across Canada from Newfoundland to British Columbia and the Northwest Territories, and in the western United States to California.

The wingspan is about 40 mm. Adults are on wing from June to September depending on the location. There is one generation per year.

This was formerly considered to be a subspecies of Apamea dubitans.
