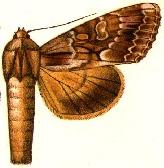

Scientific classification
- Kingdom: Animalia
- Phylum: Arthropoda
- Class: Insecta
- Order: Lepidoptera
- Superfamily: Noctuoidea
- Family: Noctuidae
- Genus: Apamea
- Species: A. maxima

Binomial name
- Apamea maxima Dyar, 1904

Synonyms
- Polia maxima; Andropolia maxima

= Apamea maxima =

Species of moth

Apamea maxima is a moth of the family Noctuidae. It is native to western North America, where it is found from British Columbia to California.
