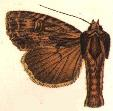

Scientific classification
- Kingdom: Animalia
- Phylum: Arthropoda
- Clade: Pancrustacea
- Class: Insecta
- Order: Lepidoptera
- Superfamily: Noctuoidea
- Family: Noctuidae
- Genus: Apamea
- Species: A. perstriata

Binomial name
- Apamea perstriata (Hampson, 1908)

Synonyms
- Parastichtis perstriata Hampson, 1908

= Apamea perstriata =

Species of moth

Apamea perstriata is a moth of the family Noctuidae.
