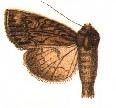

Scientific classification
- Domain: Eukaryota
- Kingdom: Animalia
- Phylum: Arthropoda
- Class: Insecta
- Order: Lepidoptera
- Superfamily: Noctuoidea
- Family: Noctuidae
- Genus: Apamea
- Species: A. perpensa

Binomial name
- Apamea perpensa (Grote, 1881)

Synonyms
- Hadena perpenoa Grote, 1881

= Apamea perpensa =

Species of moth

Apamea perpensa is a moth of the family Noctuidae and the Apameini tribe.

It was identified in 1881 by Augustus Radcliffe Grote.
