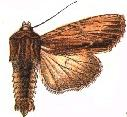

Scientific classification
- Domain: Eukaryota
- Kingdom: Animalia
- Phylum: Arthropoda
- Class: Insecta
- Order: Lepidoptera
- Superfamily: Noctuoidea
- Family: Noctuidae
- Genus: Apamea
- Species: A. cuculliformis

Binomial name
- Apamea cuculliformis Grote, 1875

Synonyms
- Hadena cuculliformis

= Apamea cuculliformis =

Species of moth

Apamea cuculliformis is a moth of the family Noctuidae. It is found in western North America, including California, Washington and British Columbia.

This wingspan is about 43 mm.
