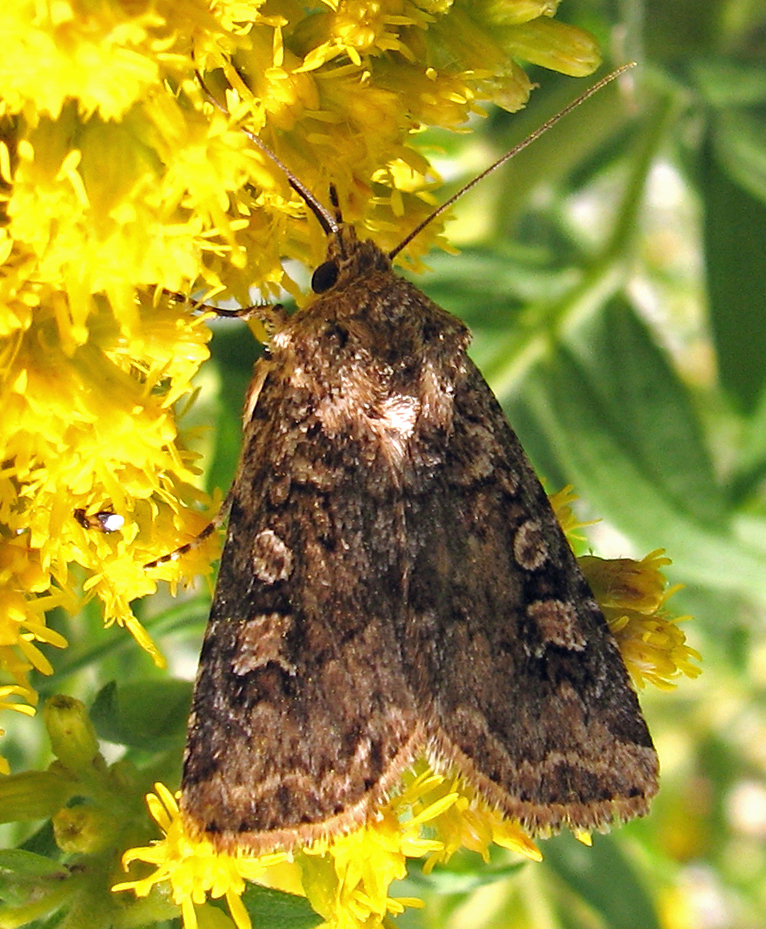

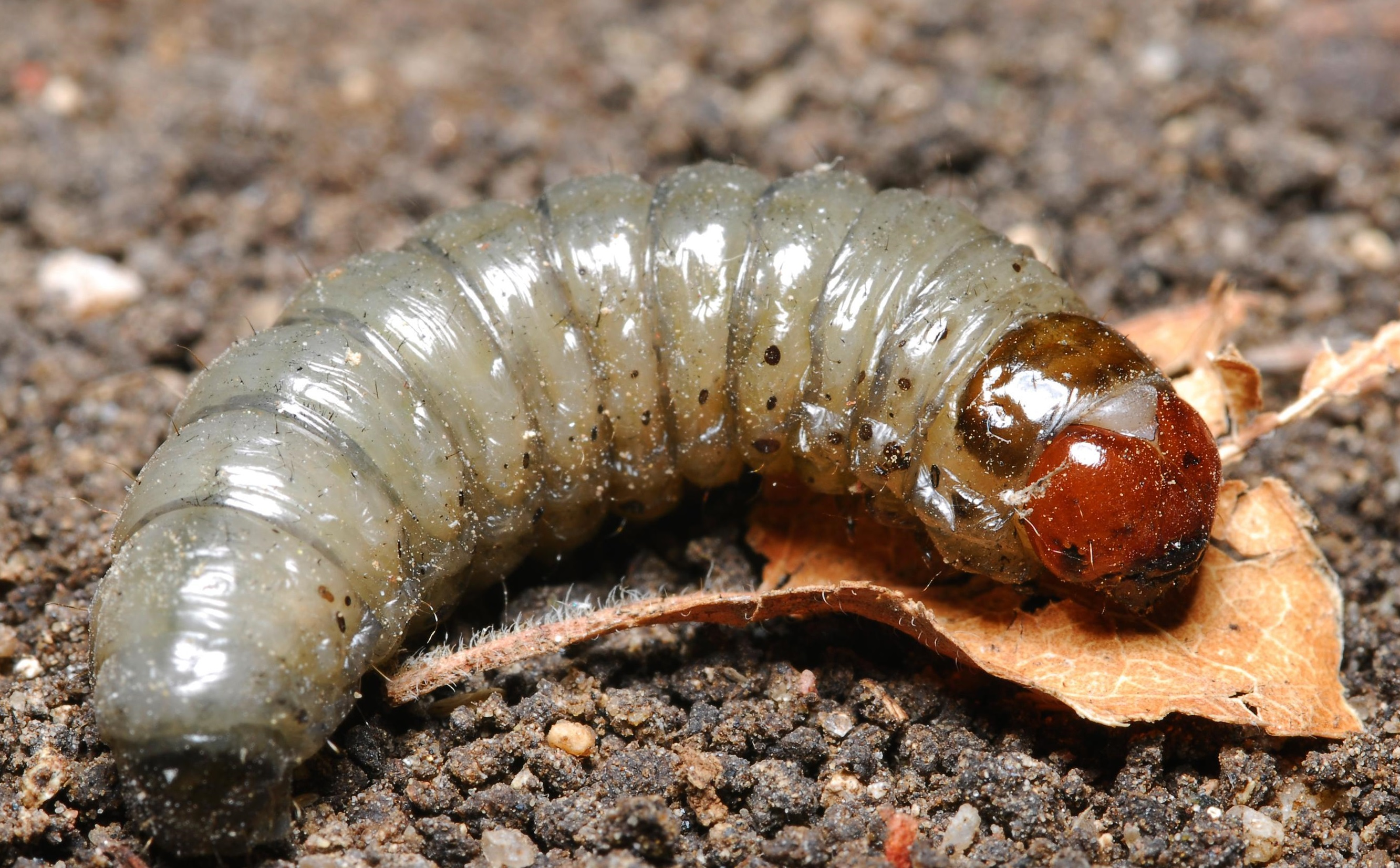
- Adult (top) and larva (bottom)

Conservation status
- Secure (NatureServe)

Scientific classification
- Kingdom: Animalia
- Phylum: Arthropoda
- Class: Insecta
- Order: Lepidoptera
- Superfamily: Noctuoidea
- Family: Noctuidae
- Genus: Apamea
- Species: A. devastator

Binomial name
- Apamea devastator (Brace, 1819)

Synonyms
- Agrotis marshallana; Crymodes devastator; Mamestra contenta; Mamestra ordinaria; Phalaena devastator (basionym); Polia speciosa

= Apamea devastator =

Glassy cutworm

Species of moth

Apamea devastator, the glassy cutworm, is a moth of the family Noctuidae. The moth is found in northeastern North America, including Nova Scotia, Alberta, New York, Ohio, and Massachusetts.

The wingspan is 35 to 40 mm. The moth flies from May to September, depending on the location.

The larva, a cutworm, feeds on various grasses. It is subterranean and attacks the roots and basal stems of its hosts.
