= Apamea indocilis =

Ignorant apamea

Scientific classification
- Kingdom: Animalia
- Phylum: Arthropoda
- Class: Insecta
- Order: Lepidoptera
- Superfamily: Noctuoidea
- Family: Noctuidae
- Genus: Apamea
- Species: A. indocilis

Binomial name
- Apamea indocilis (Walker, 1856)

Synonyms
- Hadena lona Strecker, 1898; Xylophasia indocilis Walker, 1856; Apamea remissa indocilis; Apamea ampliata (McDunnough, 1940)

Species of moth

Apamea indocilis, the ignorant apamea, is a moth of the family Noctuidae. It is native to North America, where it is distributed throughout southern Canada and the northern United States. In the east its range extends from Newfoundland to South Carolina. In the west it occurs as far south as San Francisco Bay and in the Rocky Mountains to New Mexico.

The forewings are 15 to 19 millimeters long.
