= Apamea roedereri =

Scientific classification
- Kingdom: Animalia
- Phylum: Arthropoda
- Class: Insecta
- Order: Lepidoptera
- Superfamily: Noctuoidea
- Family: Noctuidae
- Genus: Apamea
- Species: A. roedereri

Binomial name
- Apamea roedereri Viette, 1967

Species of moth

Apamea roedereri is a moth of the family Noctuidae. It is found in northern Madagascar.

Its wingspan ranges from 45 to 67 mm and the forewings are 23 to 33 mm in length. The female is larger than the male.
