= Apamea purpurina =

Scientific classification
- Kingdom: Animalia
- Phylum: Arthropoda
- Clade: Pancrustacea
- Class: Insecta
- Order: Lepidoptera
- Superfamily: Noctuoidea
- Family: Noctuidae
- Genus: Apamea
- Species: A. purpurina

Binomial name
- Apamea purpurina (Hampson, 1902)

Synonyms
- Euplexia purpurina Hampson, 1902

Species of moth

Apamea purpurina is a moth of the family Noctuidae.
