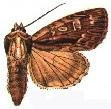

Conservation status
- Secure (NatureServe)

Scientific classification
- Domain: Eukaryota
- Kingdom: Animalia
- Phylum: Arthropoda
- Class: Insecta
- Order: Lepidoptera
- Superfamily: Noctuoidea
- Family: Noctuidae
- Genus: Apamea
- Species: A. nigrior

Binomial name
- Apamea nigrior Smith, 1891

Synonyms
- Xylophasia nigrior

= Apamea nigrior =

Species of moth

Apamea nigrior, the black-dashed apamea or dark apamea, is a moth of the family Noctuidae. It is found from New Brunswick to Georgia, west to Indiana, north to Wisconsin and Ontario.

The wingspan is about 38 mm. Adults are on wing from May to July depending on the location.
