= Apamea commoda =

Southern Quaker

Scientific classification
- Kingdom: Animalia
- Phylum: Arthropoda
- Clade: Pancrustacea
- Class: Insecta
- Order: Lepidoptera
- Superfamily: Noctuoidea
- Family: Noctuidae
- Genus: Apamea
- Species: A. commoda

Binomial name
- Apamea commoda Walker, 1857

Synonyms
- Xylina commoda; Hadena satina

Species of moth

Apamea commoda, the southern Quaker, is a moth of the family Noctuidae. The species was first described by Francis Walker in 1857. It is native to North America, where it is distributed from Nova Scotia west across southern Canada to southern British Columbia, north to Alaska and Yukon Territory, and south at least into Manitoba.

This wingspan is about 37 mm. The moth flies from June to July depending on the location.

== Subspecies ==
- Apamea commoda commoda
- Apamea commoda alberta (Alberta)
