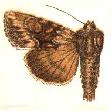

Scientific classification
- Domain: Eukaryota
- Kingdom: Animalia
- Phylum: Arthropoda
- Class: Insecta
- Order: Lepidoptera
- Superfamily: Noctuoidea
- Family: Noctuidae
- Genus: Apamea
- Species: A. unita

Binomial name
- Apamea unita (Smith, 1904)

Synonyms
- Xylophasia unita Smith, 1904

= Apamea unita =

Species of moth

Apamea unita is a moth of the family Noctuidae. It is found in North America from Alberta south to Arizona.
