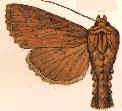

Conservation status
- Unranked (NatureServe)

Scientific classification
- Kingdom: Animalia
- Phylum: Arthropoda
- Class: Insecta
- Order: Lepidoptera
- Superfamily: Noctuoidea
- Family: Noctuidae
- Genus: Apamea
- Species: A. genialis

Binomial name
- Apamea genialis (Grote, 1874)

Synonyms
- Hadena genialis Grote, 1874; Parastichtis genialis Hampson, 1908

= Apamea genialis =

Species of moth

Apamea genialis is a moth of the family Noctuidae. It is found in California and Montana, the United States.
