= Apamea macronephra =

Scientific classification
- Domain: Eukaryota
- Kingdom: Animalia
- Phylum: Arthropoda
- Class: Insecta
- Order: Lepidoptera
- Superfamily: Noctuoidea
- Family: Noctuidae
- Genus: Apamea
- Species: A. macronephra

Binomial name
- Apamea macronephra Berio, 1959

Species of moth

Apamea macronephra is a moth of the family Noctuidae first described by Emilio Berio in 1959. It is found on Madagascar.

This species has a wingspan of 51 mm.
