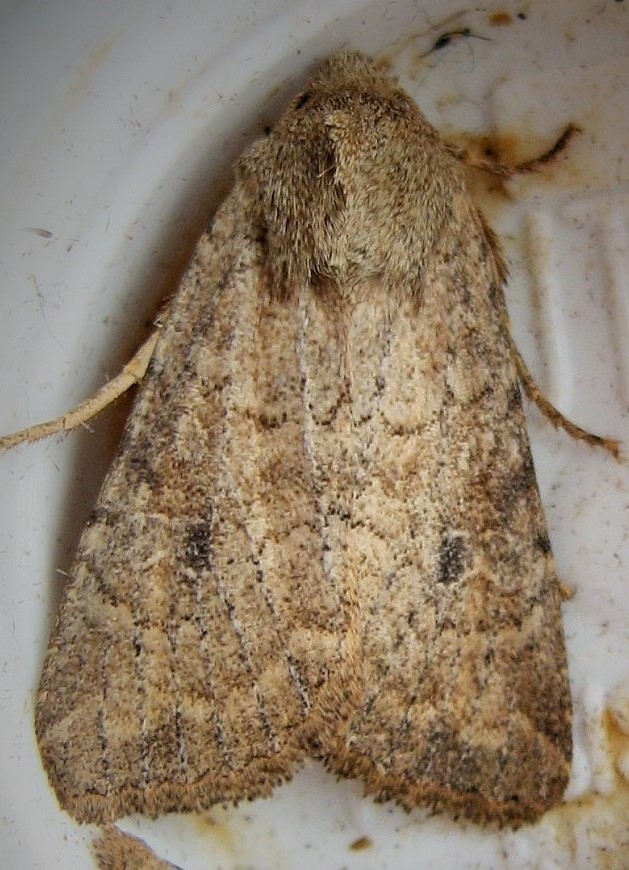

Scientific classification
- Kingdom: Animalia
- Phylum: Arthropoda
- Clade: Pancrustacea
- Class: Insecta
- Order: Lepidoptera
- Superfamily: Noctuoidea
- Family: Noctuidae
- Genus: Apamea
- Species: A. lutosa

Binomial name
- Apamea lutosa (Andrews, 1877)

Synonyms
- Orthosia lutosa Andrews, 1877; Agroperina lutosa (Andrews, 1877)

= Apamea lutosa =

Opalescent apamea

Species of moth

Apamea lutosa, commonly known as the opalescent apamea, is a species of moth in the family Noctuidae. It is found in Canada (Ontario, Quebec, British Columbia, Saskatchewan and Manitoba) and the north-eastern United States (including New York and Indiana).

Larvae have been recorded on Elytrigia repens.
