= Apamea lintneri =

Scientific classification
- Domain: Eukaryota
- Kingdom: Animalia
- Phylum: Arthropoda
- Class: Insecta
- Order: Lepidoptera
- Superfamily: Noctuoidea
- Family: Noctuidae
- Genus: Apamea
- Species: A. lintneri

Binomial name
- Apamea lintneri (Grote, 1873)

Species of moth

Apamea lintneri, the sand wainscot moth, is a species of moth native to North America. It is listed as a species of special concern in the US state of Connecticut. The species was described by Augustus Radcliffe Grote in 1873.
