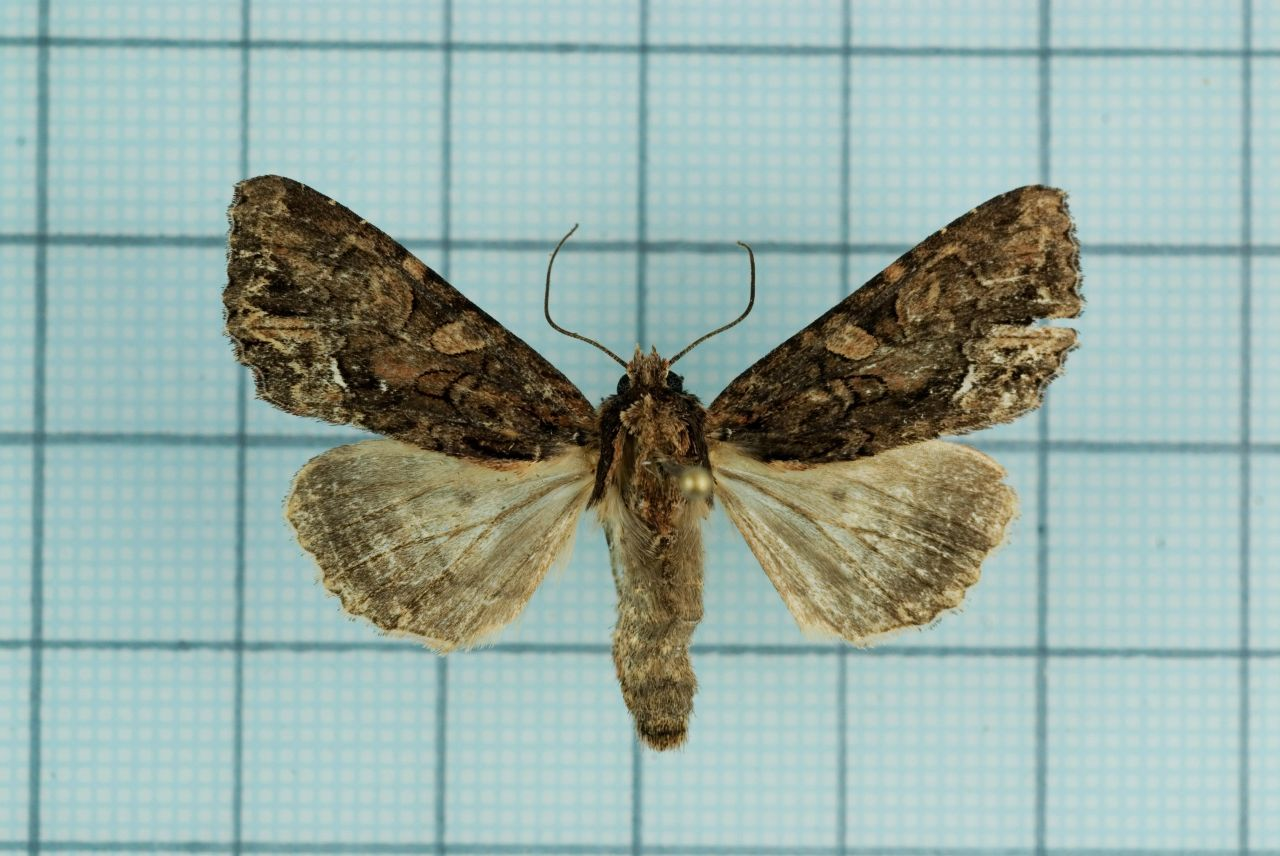

Scientific classification
- Domain: Eukaryota
- Kingdom: Animalia
- Phylum: Arthropoda
- Class: Insecta
- Order: Lepidoptera
- Superfamily: Noctuoidea
- Family: Noctuidae
- Genus: Apamea
- Species: A. magnirena

Binomial name
- Apamea magnirena (Boursin, 1943)

Synonyms
- Parastichtis magnirena Boursin, 1943

= Apamea magnirena =

Species of moth

Apamea magnirena is a moth of the family Noctuidae.
