= Apamea relicina =

Scientific classification
- Domain: Eukaryota
- Kingdom: Animalia
- Phylum: Arthropoda
- Class: Insecta
- Order: Lepidoptera
- Superfamily: Noctuoidea
- Family: Noctuidae
- Tribe: Apameini
- Genus: Apamea
- Species: A. relicina

Binomial name
- Apamea relicina (Morrison, 1875)

Species of moth

Apamea relicina is a species of cutworm or dart moth in the family Noctuidae. It is found in North America.

The MONA or Hodges number for Apamea relicina is 9380.

== Subspecies ==
These two subspecies belong to the species Apamea relicina:

- Apamea relicina migrata (Smith, 1903)
- Apamea relicina relicina (Morrison, 1875)
