= Apamea tahoeensis =

Scientific classification
- Domain: Eukaryota
- Kingdom: Animalia
- Phylum: Arthropoda
- Class: Insecta
- Order: Lepidoptera
- Superfamily: Noctuoidea
- Family: Noctuidae
- Tribe: Apameini
- Genus: Apamea
- Species: A. tahoeensis

Binomial name
- Apamea tahoeensis Mikkola & Lafontaine, 2009

Species of moth

Apamea tahoeensis is a species of cutworm or dart moth in the family Noctuidae. It is found in North America.

The MONA or Hodges number for Apamea tahoeensis is 9339.2.
