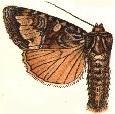

Scientific classification
- Domain: Eukaryota
- Kingdom: Animalia
- Phylum: Arthropoda
- Class: Insecta
- Order: Lepidoptera
- Superfamily: Noctuoidea
- Family: Noctuidae
- Genus: Apamea
- Species: A. occidens

Binomial name
- Apamea occidens Grote, 1878

Synonyms
- Hadena occidens; Hadena coloradensis

= Apamea occidens =

Western apamea

Species of moth

Apamea occidens, the western apamea, is a moth of the family Noctuidae. The species was first described by Augustus Radcliffe Grote in 1878. It is native to western North America as far east as Alberta and Kansas.
