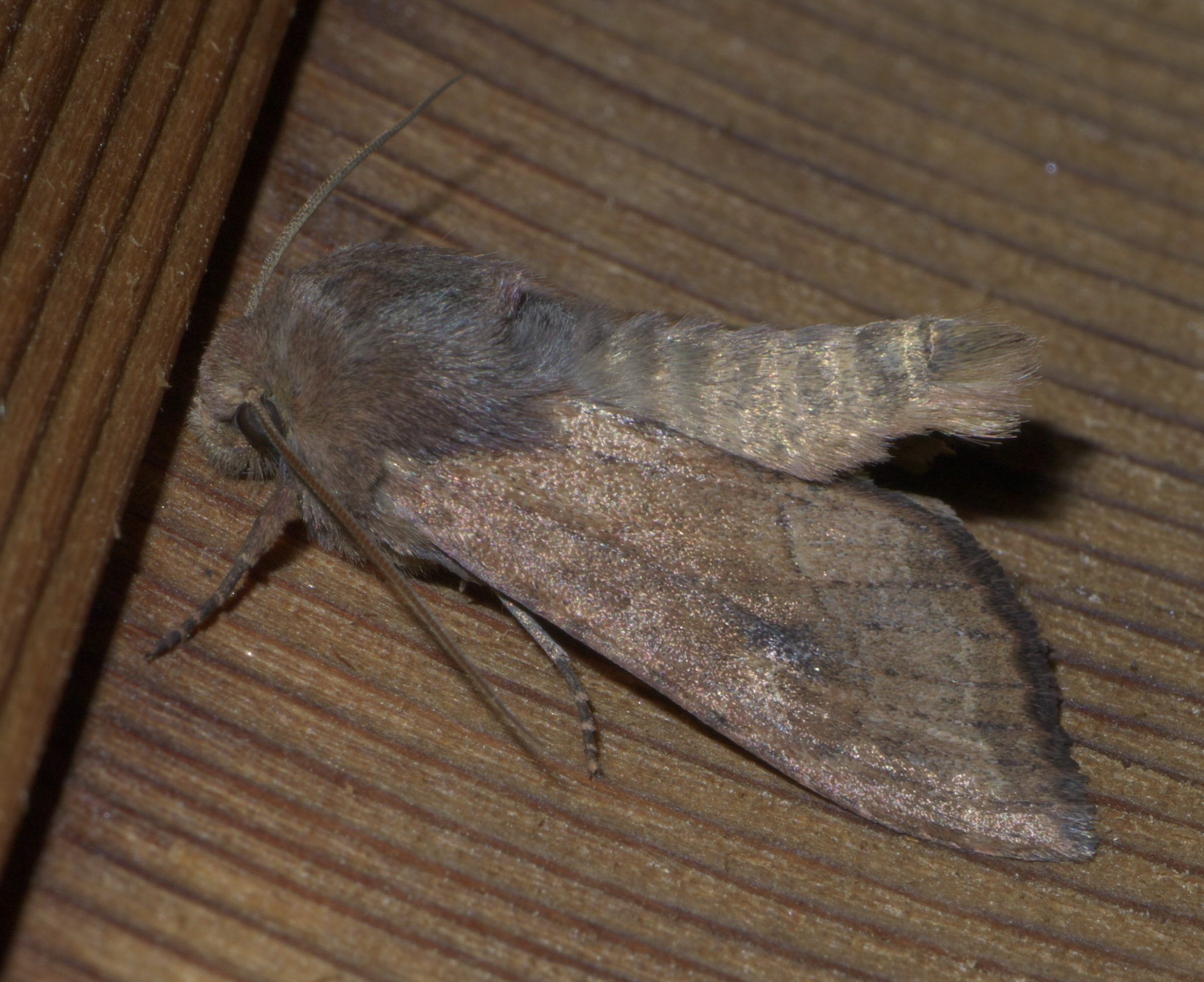

Scientific classification
- Kingdom: Animalia
- Phylum: Arthropoda
- Class: Insecta
- Order: Lepidoptera
- Superfamily: Noctuoidea
- Family: Noctuidae
- Genus: Apamea
- Species: A. inficita

Binomial name
- Apamea inficita Walker, 1857

Synonyms
- Agroperina inficita; Apamea popofensis (Smith, 1900); Apamea conradi (Grote, 1879); Graphiphora inficita; Orthosia belangeri

= Apamea inficita =

Lined Quaker

Species of moth

Apamea inficita, the lined Quaker is a moth of the family Noctuidae. The species was first described by Francis Walker in 1857. It is native to North America, where it can be found from Newfoundland west to British Columbia, north to the Yukon and the Northwest Territories, and south to Colorado.

The wingspan is 34–36 mm. The moth flies from July to August depending on the location.

== Subspecies ==
- Apamea inficita conradi (Grote, 1879)
- Apamea inficita indela (Smith, 1910)
- Apamea inficita inficita
- Apamea inficita lineosa
