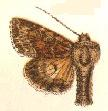

Scientific classification
- Kingdom: Animalia
- Phylum: Arthropoda
- Class: Insecta
- Order: Lepidoptera
- Superfamily: Noctuoidea
- Family: Noctuidae
- Genus: Apamea
- Species: A. inordinata

Binomial name
- Apamea inordinata (Morrison, 1875)

Synonyms
- Hadena inordinata Morrison, 1875; Xylophasia inordinata var. montana Smith, 1890

= Apamea inordinata =

Species of moth

Apamea inordinata is a moth of the family Noctuidae. It is found in the United States, including New York, Massachusetts, Pennsylvania, Colorado, and California. In Canada it is found in Ontario, Quebec, New Brunswick, Nova Scotia, British Columbia, Alberta, Saskatchewan and Manitoba. Its wingspan is about 34 mm (1.3 in). The species is listed as threatened in Connecticut.

== Subspecies ==
- Apamea inordinata inordinata (Morrison, 1875)
- Apamea inordinata semilunata (Grote, 1881)
- Apamea inordinata olympia Crabo, 2009
