= Apamea ferrago =

Scientific classification
- Domain: Eukaryota
- Kingdom: Animalia
- Phylum: Arthropoda
- Class: Insecta
- Order: Lepidoptera
- Superfamily: Noctuoidea
- Family: Noctuidae
- Genus: Apamea
- Species: A. ferrago

Binomial name
- Apamea ferrago Eversmann, 1837

Species of moth

Apamea ferrago is a moth belonging to the family Noctuidae. The species was first described by Eduard Friedrich Eversmann in 1837.

It is native to Europe.
