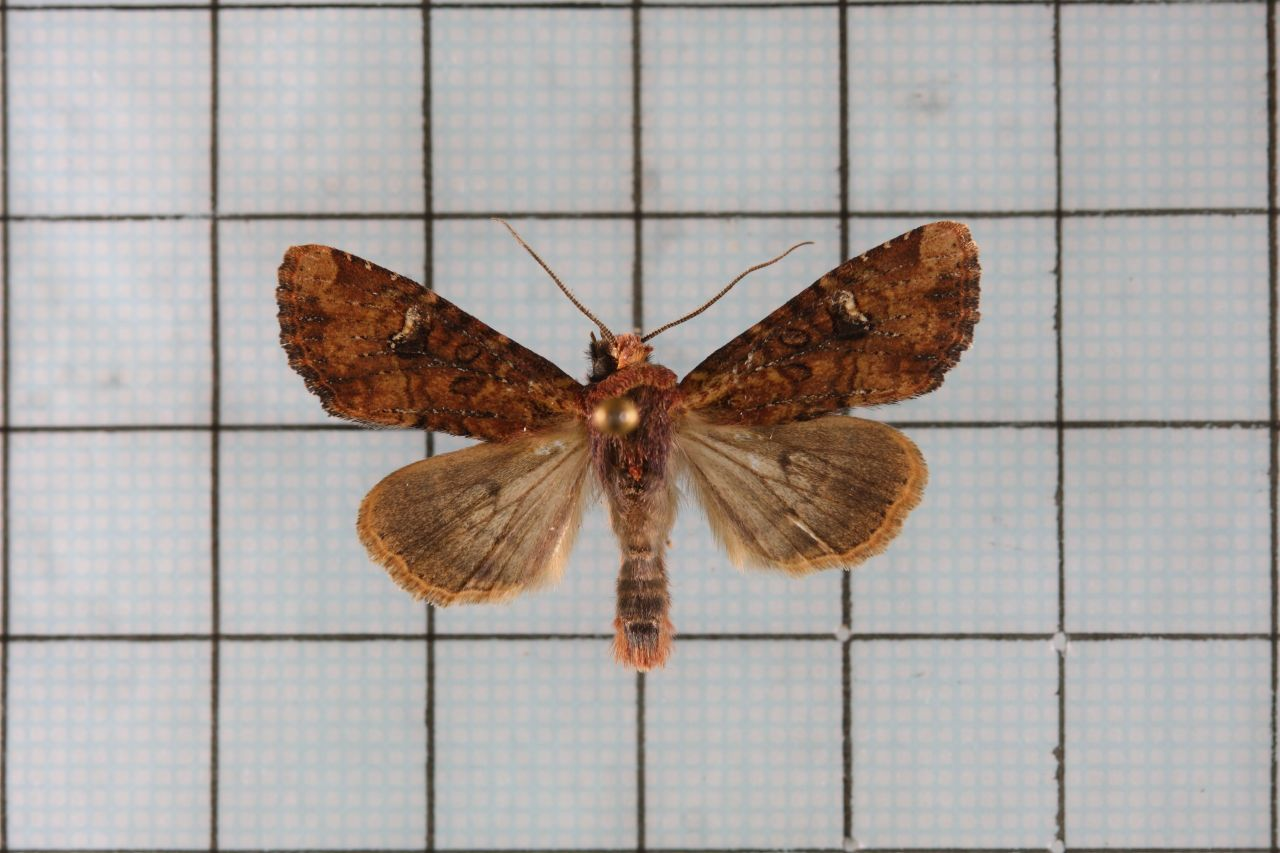

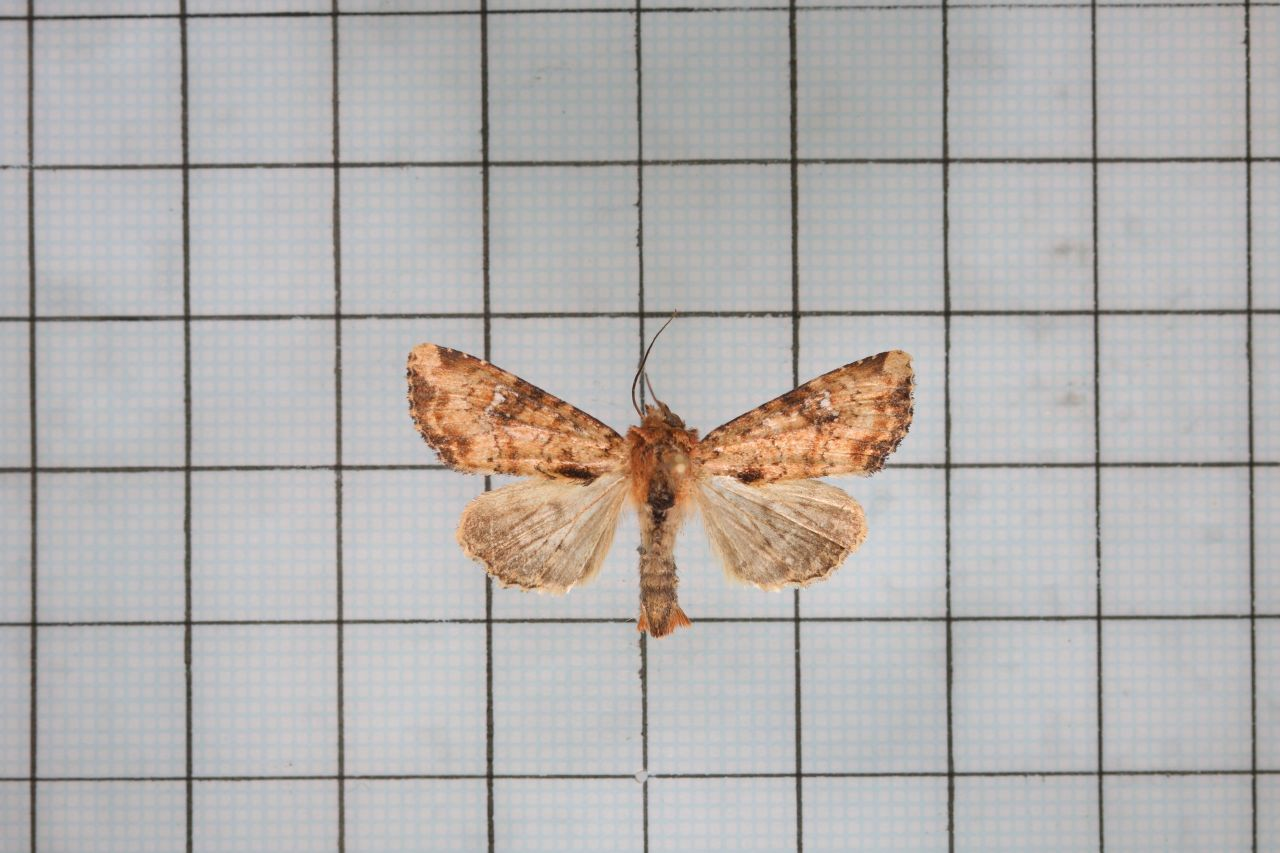

Scientific classification
- Domain: Eukaryota
- Kingdom: Animalia
- Phylum: Arthropoda
- Class: Insecta
- Order: Lepidoptera
- Superfamily: Noctuoidea
- Family: Noctuidae
- Genus: Apamea
- Species: A. rufus

Binomial name
- Apamea rufus (Chang, 1991)

= Apamea rufus =

Species of moth

Apamea rufus is a moth of the family Noctuidae.
