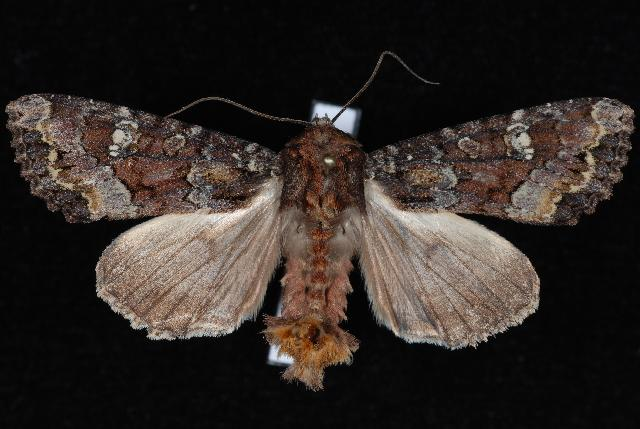

Conservation status
- Secure (NatureServe)

Scientific classification
- Domain: Eukaryota
- Kingdom: Animalia
- Phylum: Arthropoda
- Class: Insecta
- Order: Lepidoptera
- Superfamily: Noctuoidea
- Family: Noctuidae
- Genus: Apamea
- Species: A. amputatrix

Binomial name
- Apamea amputatrix (Fitch, 1857)

Synonyms
- Apamea castanea Grote, 1874; Eurois pluviosa Walker, 1865; Hadena amica Harris, 1863; (preocc.): Hadena amputatrix Fitch, 1857; Hadena arctica Freyer, 1842; Hadena formosus Ellsworth, 1918

= Apamea amputatrix =

Yellow-headed cutworm

Species of moth

Apamea amputatrix, the yellow-headed cutworm, is a moth of the family Noctuidae. It is found in most of North America, north to the Arctic.

== Description ==
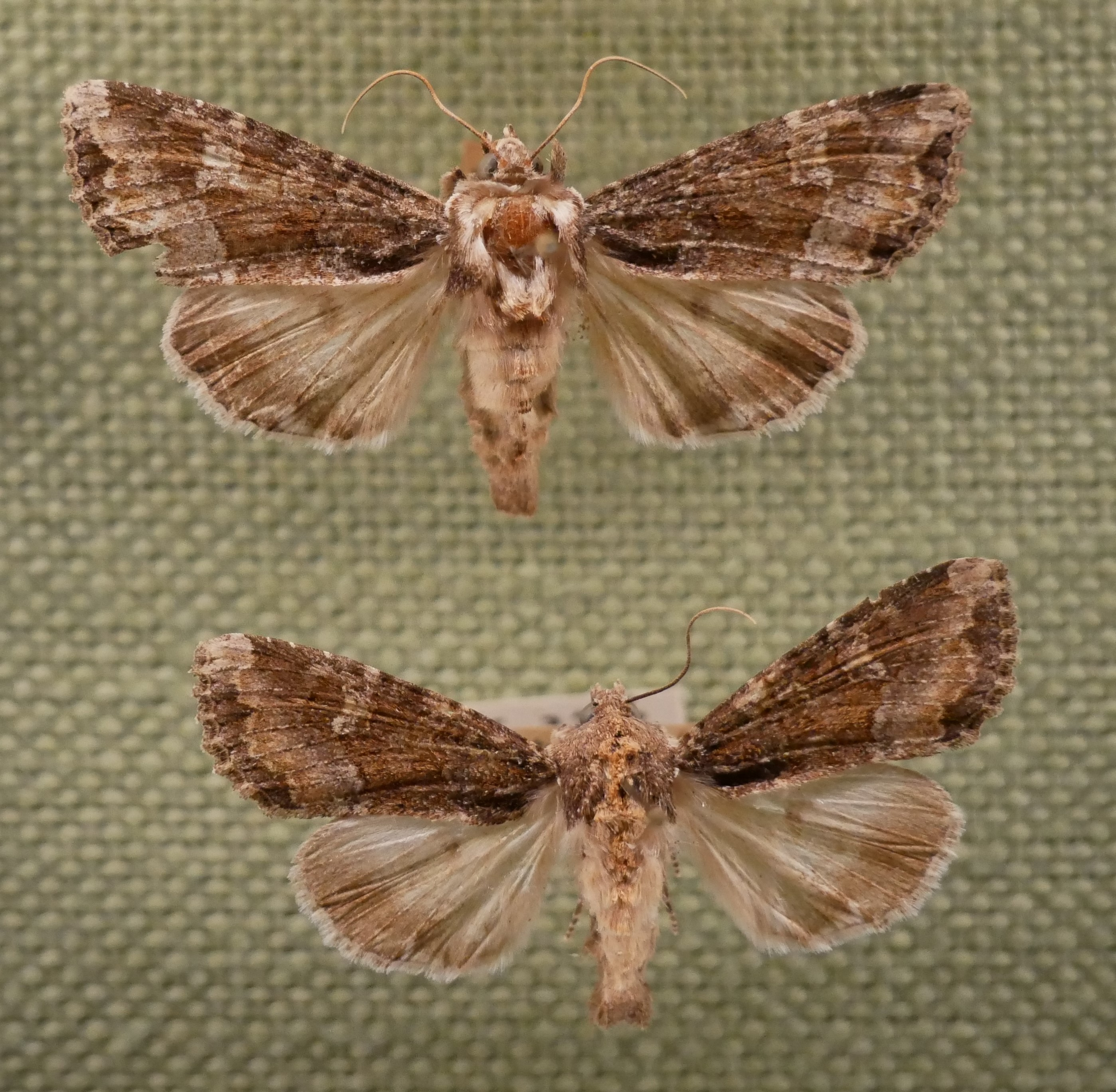
Apamea amputatrix

This wingspan is about 40 mm. The moth flies from April to October depending on the location.

The larvae feed on a wide range of host plants, including vegetable crops.
