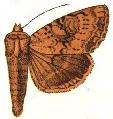

Scientific classification
- Domain: Eukaryota
- Kingdom: Animalia
- Phylum: Arthropoda
- Class: Insecta
- Order: Lepidoptera
- Superfamily: Noctuoidea
- Family: Noctuidae
- Genus: Apamea
- Species: A. veterina

Binomial name
- Apamea veterina (Lederer, 1853)

Synonyms
- Hadena veterina Lederer, 1853; Hadena haelsseni Graeser, 1890; Hadena veterina var. mandschurica Staudinger, 1892; Parastichtis veterina (Lederer, 1853); Parastichtis jezoensis Matsumura, 1926; Parastichtis veterina coreina Bryk, 1948

= Apamea veterina =

Species of moth

Apamea veterina is a moth of the family Noctuidae. It is found on the Korean Peninsula, in Hokkaido in Japan, in northeastern China, in the Russian Far East (Primorye, Khabarovsk, and Amur Oblast), and in southern Siberia (in Transbaikalia and the Altai Mountains).

The length of the forewings is about 21 millimetres (0.83 in).

== Subspecies ==
- Apamea veterina haelsseni
- Apamea veterina veterina
