= Apamea bernardino =

Scientific classification
- Domain: Eukaryota
- Kingdom: Animalia
- Phylum: Arthropoda
- Class: Insecta
- Order: Lepidoptera
- Superfamily: Noctuoidea
- Family: Noctuidae
- Genus: Apamea
- Species: A. bernardino

Binomial name
- Apamea bernardino Mikkola and Mustelin, 2000

Species of moth

Apamea bernardino is a moth of the family Noctuidae. It is known only from the San Bernardino Mountains of California, where it lives in coniferous forests above 2000 meters in elevation. It was first described in 2000 from a specimen collected at Barton Flats.

The moth has a rusty brown head and thorax and a buff abdomen with brown and pink-tinged tufts. The wingspan is 39 to 42 millimeters.
