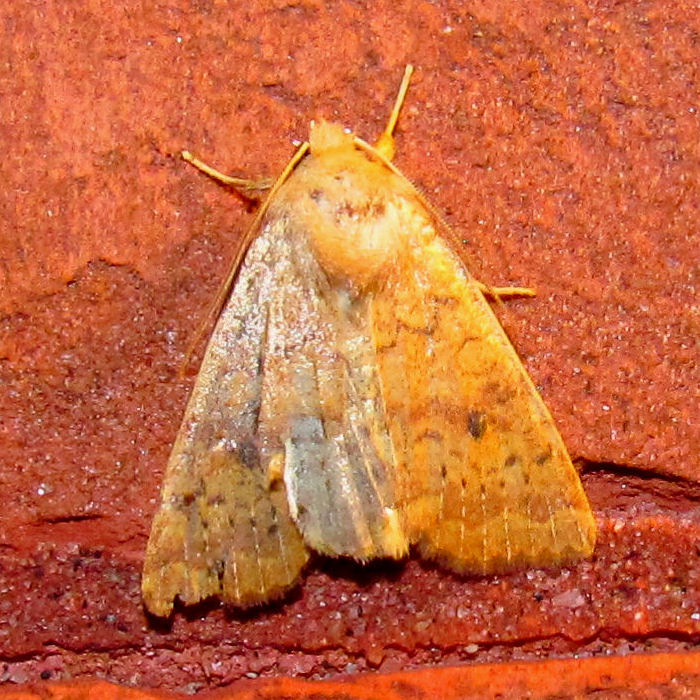

Conservation status
- Secure (NatureServe)

Scientific classification
- Kingdom: Animalia
- Phylum: Arthropoda
- Clade: Pancrustacea
- Class: Insecta
- Order: Lepidoptera
- Superfamily: Noctuoidea
- Family: Noctuidae
- Genus: Apamea
- Species: A. helva

Binomial name
- Apamea helva Grote, 1875

Synonyms
- Orthosia helva; Agroperina helva

= Apamea helva =

Yellow three-spot

Species of moth

Apamea helva, the yellow three-spot, is a moth of the family Noctuidae. It is found from Saskatchewan to New Brunswick, south to Georgia, and west to Oklahoma and Colorado.

== Description ==
The wingspan is 35–41 mm. Adults are on wing from July to September depending on the location.

The larvae feed on various grasses.
