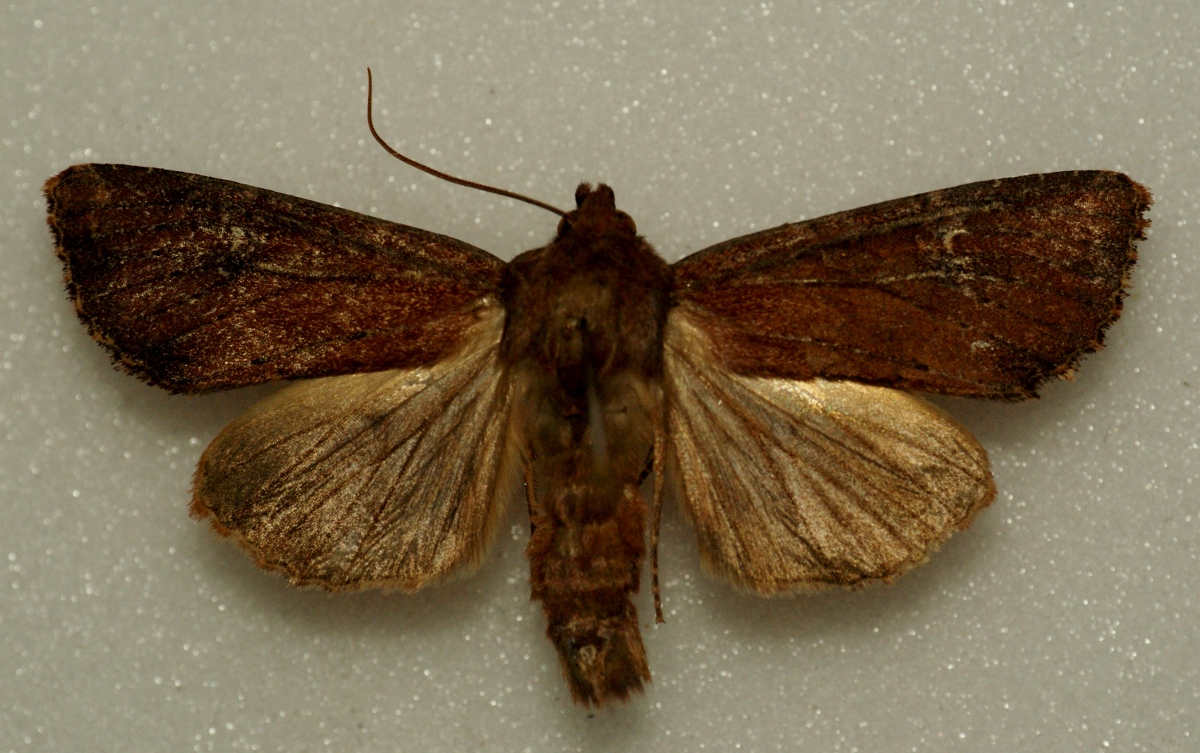

Scientific classification
- Domain: Eukaryota
- Kingdom: Animalia
- Phylum: Arthropoda
- Class: Insecta
- Order: Lepidoptera
- Superfamily: Noctuoidea
- Family: Noctuidae
- Genus: Apamea
- Species: A. scoparia

Binomial name
- Apamea scoparia Mikkola, Mustelin & Lafontaine, 2000

Synonyms
- Abromias scoparia

= Apamea scoparia =

Species of moth

Apamea scoparia is a moth of the family Noctuidae first described by Kauri Mikkola, Tomas Mustelin and J. Donald Lafontaine in 2000. It is one of the most common and widespread North American Apamea, being distributed from Newfoundland and Labrador to Alaska and British Columbia, and south to California and Arizona.
