= Apamea gabrieli =

Scientific classification
- Domain: Eukaryota
- Kingdom: Animalia
- Phylum: Arthropoda
- Class: Insecta
- Order: Lepidoptera
- Superfamily: Noctuoidea
- Family: Noctuidae
- Genus: Apamea
- Species: A. gabrieli

Binomial name
- Apamea gabrieli Mikkola and Mustelin, 2000

Species of moth

Apamea gabrieli is a moth in the family Noctuidae. It was first described in 2000 from a specimen collected in the San Gabriel Mountains near Big Pines in Los Angeles County, California. The species is not named after the mountains themselves but rather their eponym, Gabriel. It is also found in the San Bernardino Mountains.

The wingspan of Apamea gabrieli reaches up to 48.5 millimeters. The forewings are brownish-red, while the hindwings are buff.
