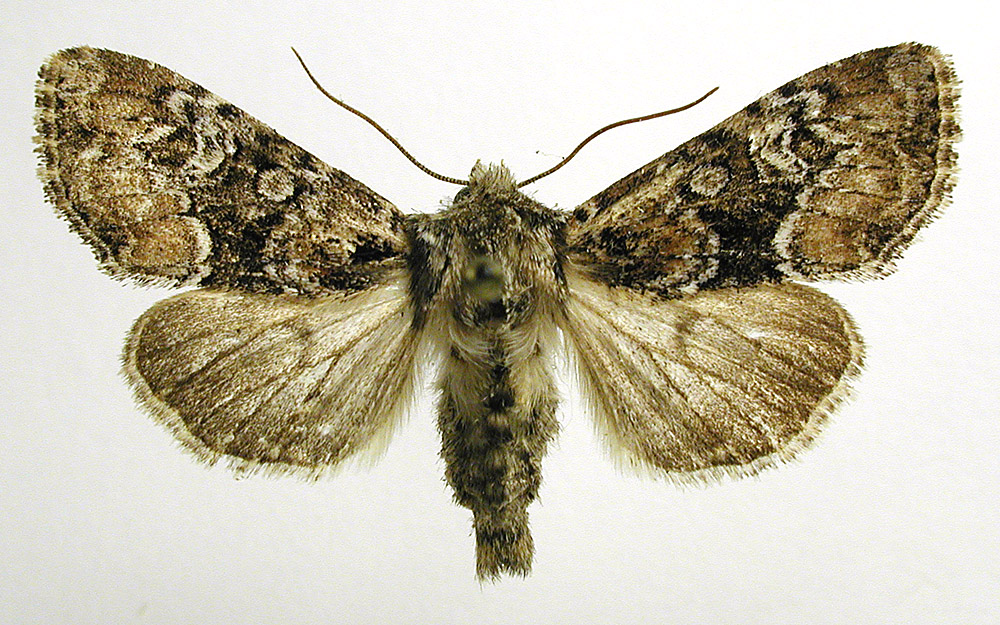
- Adult moth
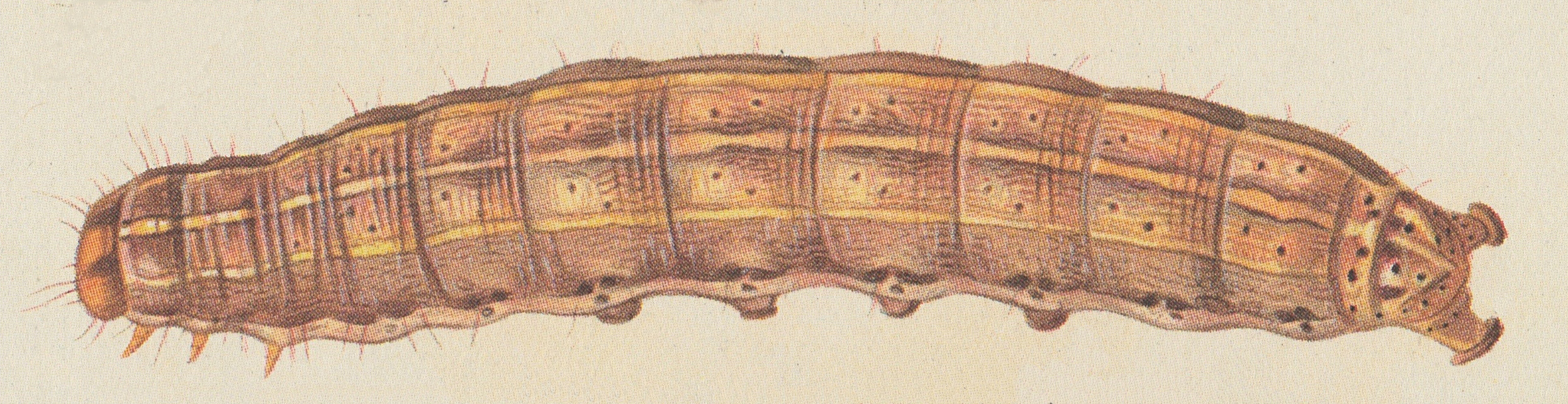
- Larva

Scientific classification
- Domain: Eukaryota
- Kingdom: Animalia
- Phylum: Arthropoda
- Class: Insecta
- Order: Lepidoptera
- Superfamily: Noctuoidea
- Family: Noctuidae
- Genus: Apamea
- Species: A. illyria

Binomial name
- Apamea illyria Freyer, 1846

Synonyms
- Abromias illyria; Polia scortea Herrich-Schäffer, 1855

= Apamea illyria =

Species of moth

Apamea illyria is a moth of the family Noctuidae. It is found in much of Europe, western Siberia, Turkey, and the Caucasus.

The wingspan is 31–36 mm. Adults are on wing May to July.

The larvae feed on Calamagrostis, Dactylis, and Deschampsia species, as well as Milium effusum.
