= Apamea plutonia =

Conservation status
- Apparently Secure (NatureServe)

Scientific classification
- Domain: Eukaryota
- Kingdom: Animalia
- Phylum: Arthropoda
- Class: Insecta
- Order: Lepidoptera
- Superfamily: Noctuoidea
- Family: Noctuidae
- Genus: Apamea
- Species: A. plutonia

Binomial name
- Apamea plutonia Grote, 1883

Synonyms
- Hadena plutonia

Species of moth

Apamea plutonia, the dusky Quaker or dusky apamea, is a moth of the family Noctuidae. The species was first described by Augustus Radcliffe Grote in 1883. It is native to northern North America, where it occurs across the boreal regions, with some occurrences from as far south as New Mexico and Pennsylvania.

The forewing length is 16 to 17 millimeters, and the wings are very dark brown, nearly black.

The cutworm larva feeds on grasses.
