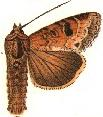

Scientific classification
- Domain: Eukaryota
- Kingdom: Animalia
- Phylum: Arthropoda
- Class: Insecta
- Order: Lepidoptera
- Superfamily: Noctuoidea
- Family: Noctuidae
- Genus: Apamea
- Species: A. alia

Binomial name
- Apamea alia Guenée, 1852

Synonyms
- Hadena suffusca; Taeniocampa alia; Xylophasia rorulenta

= Apamea alia =

Species of moth

Apamea alia is a moth of the family Noctuidae. It is found in eastern and western regions of North America.

The wingspan is about 39 mm. The moth flies from June to August depending on the location.

The larva feeds on various grasses.
