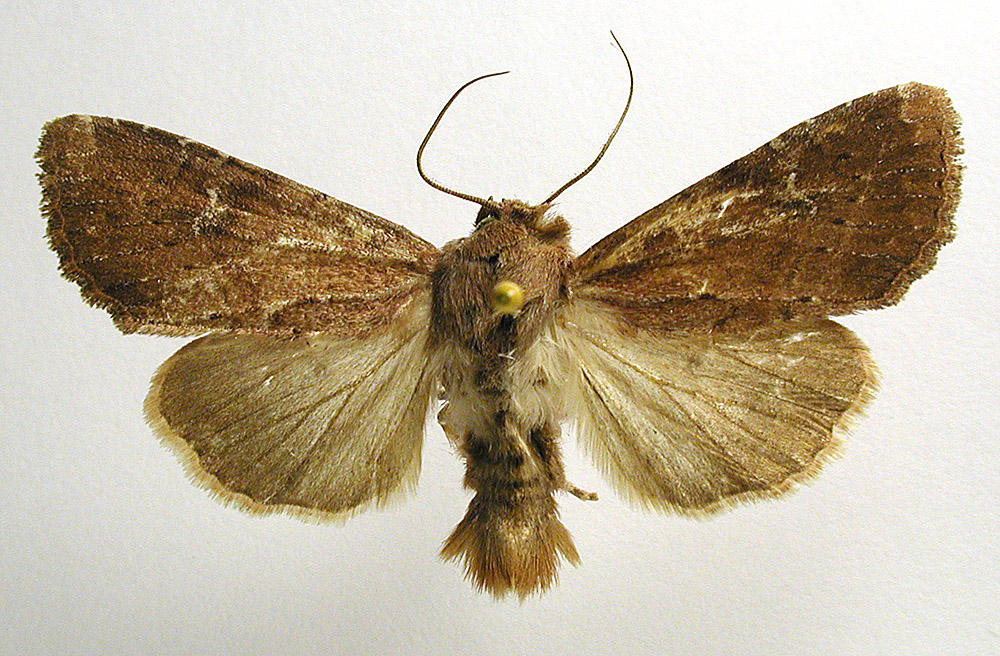

Scientific classification
- Kingdom: Animalia
- Phylum: Arthropoda
- Clade: Pancrustacea
- Class: Insecta
- Order: Lepidoptera
- Superfamily: Noctuoidea
- Family: Noctuidae
- Genus: Apamea
- Species: A. lateritia

Binomial name
- Apamea lateritia (Hufnagel, 1766)

Synonyms
- Phalaena lateritia Hufnagel, 1766; Noctua molochina Hübner, [1803]; Xylina unicolora Zetterstedt, [1839]; Hadena lateritia var. expallescens Staudinger, 1882; Hadena lateritia var. decolor Stertz, 1915; Hadena lateritia r. soldana Noack, 1925; Hadena lateritia alpium Dannehl, 1937; Agroperina lateritia kunashirina Bryk, 1942; Apamea obfuscata Hreblay & Ronkay; Agroperina lateritia; Abromias lateritia

= Apamea lateritia =

Scarce brindle

Species of moth

Apamea lateritia, the scarce brindle, is a moth of the family Noctuidae. It is found in much of the Palearctic. It is a sporadic migrant in Great Britain, where it is recorded from the east and south-east coasts.

== Technical description and variation ==
P.lateritia Hufn. (= molochina Hbn.) (39 i). Forewing dull purplish redbrown, darker towards the costa; costal area and veins sprinkled with white scales; inner and outer lines double, lunulate-dentate, the teeth marked dark and light on the veins; claviform stigma absent; orbicular and reniform dark red brown with incomplete white annuli, the orbicular generally obscure and without white outline; submarginal line indistinct; the terminal area, except at apex, rather darker; hindwing fuscous, greyer towards base, with the cell spot and veins dark; — ab. borealis Strand, from Lapland, is still darker brown; — ab. derufata ab. nov. (39 i) is pale purplish red, without the dark redbrown tinge; — the form expallescens Stgr. (39 i), from Turkestan and Tibet, is pale reddish ochreous, flushed with brown or grey brown, the terminal area always dark brown; — ab. festiva ab. nov. (40 a), from Transcaucasia, rather smaller than expallescens, is pale brickred, somewhat roughly scaled; lastly, ab. sordida ab. nov. (40 a), a decidedly smaller form, is dirty brownish fuscous, with the inner and outer lines well-marked and approximated on inner margin; of this a fairly long series, all males is in the Tring Museum, from Pescocostanzo, Italy. Larva dull dark grey; the head brown; the thoracic and anal plates black. The wingspan is about 42–50 mm.

== Biology ==
Adults are on wing from June to August.

The larvae feed on the roots of grasses.

Red color variant

Brown color variant
