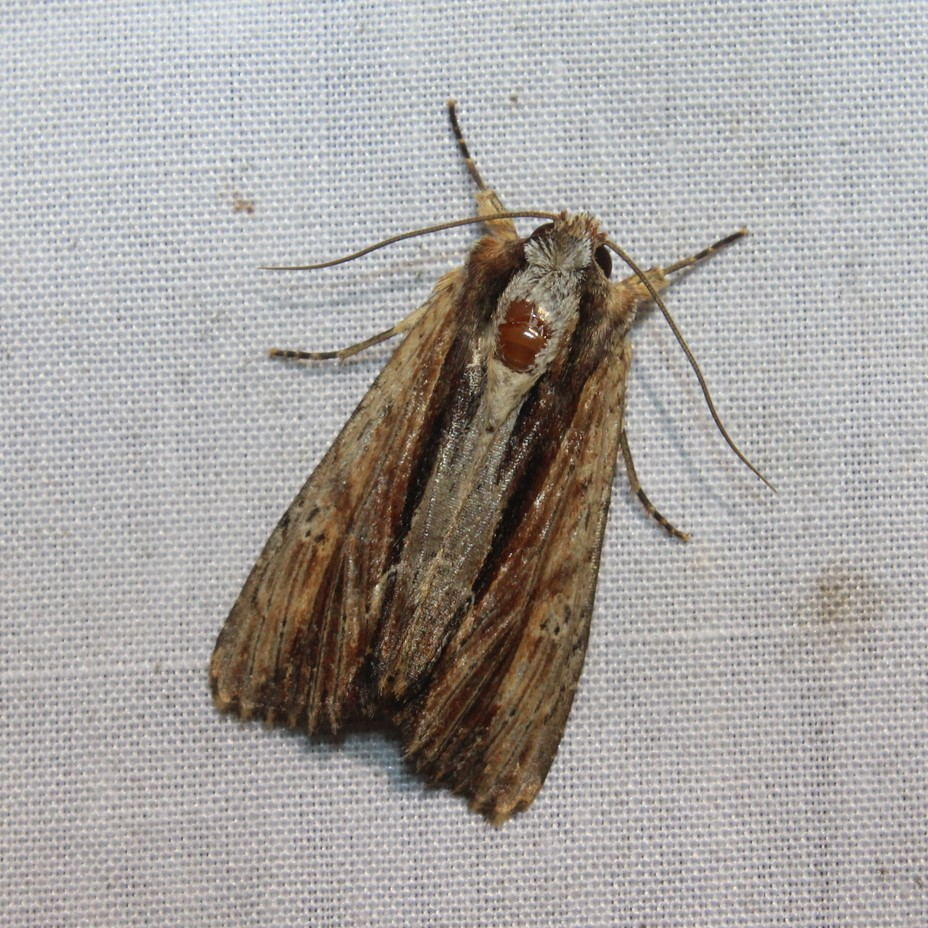

Conservation status
- Vulnerable (NatureServe)

Scientific classification
- Domain: Eukaryota
- Kingdom: Animalia
- Phylum: Arthropoda
- Class: Insecta
- Order: Lepidoptera
- Superfamily: Noctuoidea
- Family: Noctuidae
- Genus: Apamea
- Species: A. inebriata

Binomial name
- Apamea inebriata Ferguson, 1977

= Apamea inebriata =

Drunk apamea

Species of moth

Apamea inebriata, the drunk apamea, is a species of moth in the family Noctuidae. It is found along the east coast of North America from Nova Scotia, Canada to North Carolina, United States.

This species is not well known. The population of this moth has a disjunct distribution made up of scattered local occurrences, mainly in coastal regions. It is common in some areas, and quite uncommon in others. It inhabits wetlands but has been found in drier habitat types.

The moth is streaked with yellow, reddish brown, black, and gray, making it cryptic when resting on dead wood. The forewings are 15 to 19 millimeters long.
