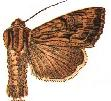

Conservation status
- Secure (NatureServe)

Scientific classification
- Domain: Eukaryota
- Kingdom: Animalia
- Phylum: Arthropoda
- Class: Insecta
- Order: Lepidoptera
- Superfamily: Noctuoidea
- Family: Noctuidae
- Genus: Apamea
- Species: A. vulgaris

Binomial name
- Apamea vulgaris (Grote & Robinson, 1866)

Synonyms
- Xylophasia vulgaris Grote & Robinson, 1866

= Apamea vulgaris =

Species of moth

Apamea vulgaris (common apamea) is a moth of the family Noctuidae. It is found from Nova Scotia to Kentucky, and west to Kansas. It has been recorded from Ontario, New York, Pennsylvania and Maryland.

== Description ==
The wingspan is about 39 mm. Adults are on wing from May to July.
