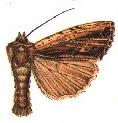

Conservation status
- Secure (NatureServe)

Scientific classification
- Domain: Eukaryota
- Kingdom: Animalia
- Phylum: Arthropoda
- Class: Insecta
- Order: Lepidoptera
- Superfamily: Noctuoidea
- Family: Noctuidae
- Genus: Apamea
- Species: A. verbascoides

Binomial name
- Apamea verbascoides Guenée, 1852

Synonyms
- Xylophasia verbascoides

= Apamea verbascoides =

Species of moth

Apamea verbascoides, the boreal apamea or mullein apamea, is a moth of the family Noctuidae. The species was first described by Achille Guenée in 1852. It is native to North America, where it is found from Saskatchewan to Newfoundland and Labrador and south to North Carolina.

== Description ==
The wingspan is 36–43 mm. Adults are on wing from June to September depending on the location. There is one generation per year.

The larvae probably feed on grasses and sedges.
