= Apamea boopis =

Scientific classification
- Kingdom: Animalia
- Phylum: Arthropoda
- Clade: Pancrustacea
- Class: Insecta
- Order: Lepidoptera
- Superfamily: Noctuoidea
- Family: Noctuidae
- Genus: Apamea
- Species: A. boopis

Binomial name
- Apamea boopis (Hampson, 1908)

Synonyms
- Parastichtis boopis Hampson, 1908

Species of moth

Apamea boopis is a moth of the family Noctuidae, brownish and medium in size, it was first described by George Francis Hampson in 1908 and is found primarily in Northern India, Nepal, Western China, Bengal and Northern Myanmar. Not much is known about the moth as it is not studied extensively.

== Biology ==
Little is known about the biology and life history of Apamea boopis. Further study is needed regarding its reproduction, habitat and seasonal preferences. Similar to other members of the genus Apamea, it is likely a nocturnal moth with cryptic wing coloration typical of grassland and woodland-edge species.
