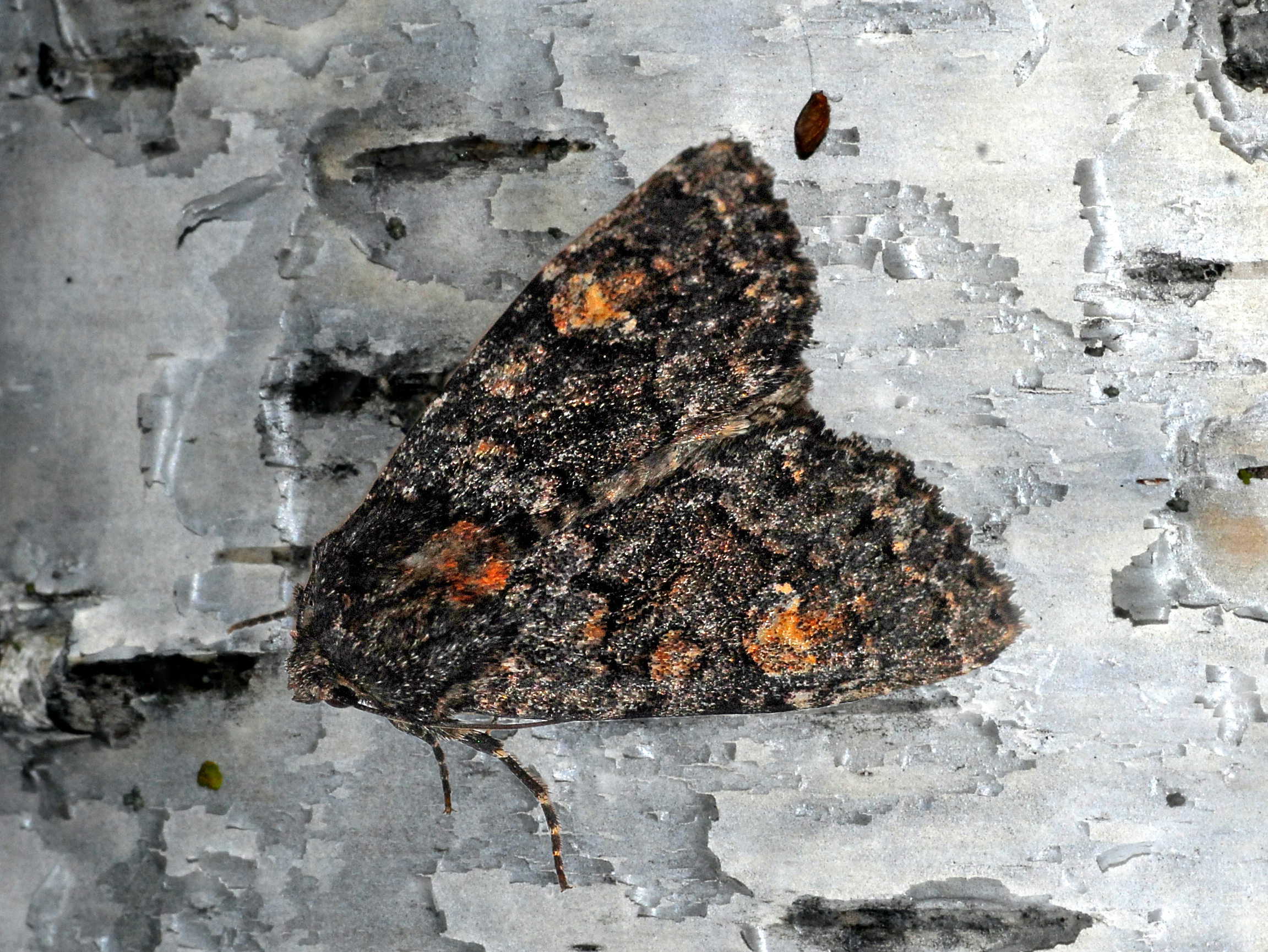

Scientific classification
- Domain: Eukaryota
- Kingdom: Animalia
- Phylum: Arthropoda
- Class: Insecta
- Order: Lepidoptera
- Superfamily: Noctuoidea
- Family: Noctuidae
- Genus: Apamea
- Species: A. rubrirena

Binomial name
- Apamea rubrirena (Treitschke, 1825)

Synonyms
- List: Apamea rubrirena marginipicta Varga, 1973; Apamea rubrirena pacifica Sugi, 1982; Crymodes rubrirena asciburgensis Koch, 1965; Crymodes rubrirena miriquidoiKoch, 1963 Crymodes rubrirena rhaetonorica Koch, 1965; Crymodes shibuyae Matsumura, 1925; Hadena feisthamelii Boisduval, 1833; Hadena rubrirena abnoba Guth, 1932; Hadena rubrirena fennica Guth, 1932; Hadena rubrirena var. hercyniae Staudinger, 1871; Mamestra rubrirena Treitschke, 1825; Mamestra sylvicola Eversmann, 1843

= Apamea rubrirena =

Species of moth

Apamea rubrirena is a moth of the family Noctuidae.

== Distribution ==
This species is present from northern and western Europe, east through Russia and Asia to Japan and Korea. It is also present on the Kuril Islands, the Aleutian Islands and has been reported from Alaska for the first time in 1989.

== Habitat ==
These moths colonize montane to subalpine coniferous forests, at an elevation up to 2,400 metres (7,900 ft) above sea level. In Europe they especially occur in the Alps and in lower mountains, while in Russia they can be found in the taiga.

== Description ==
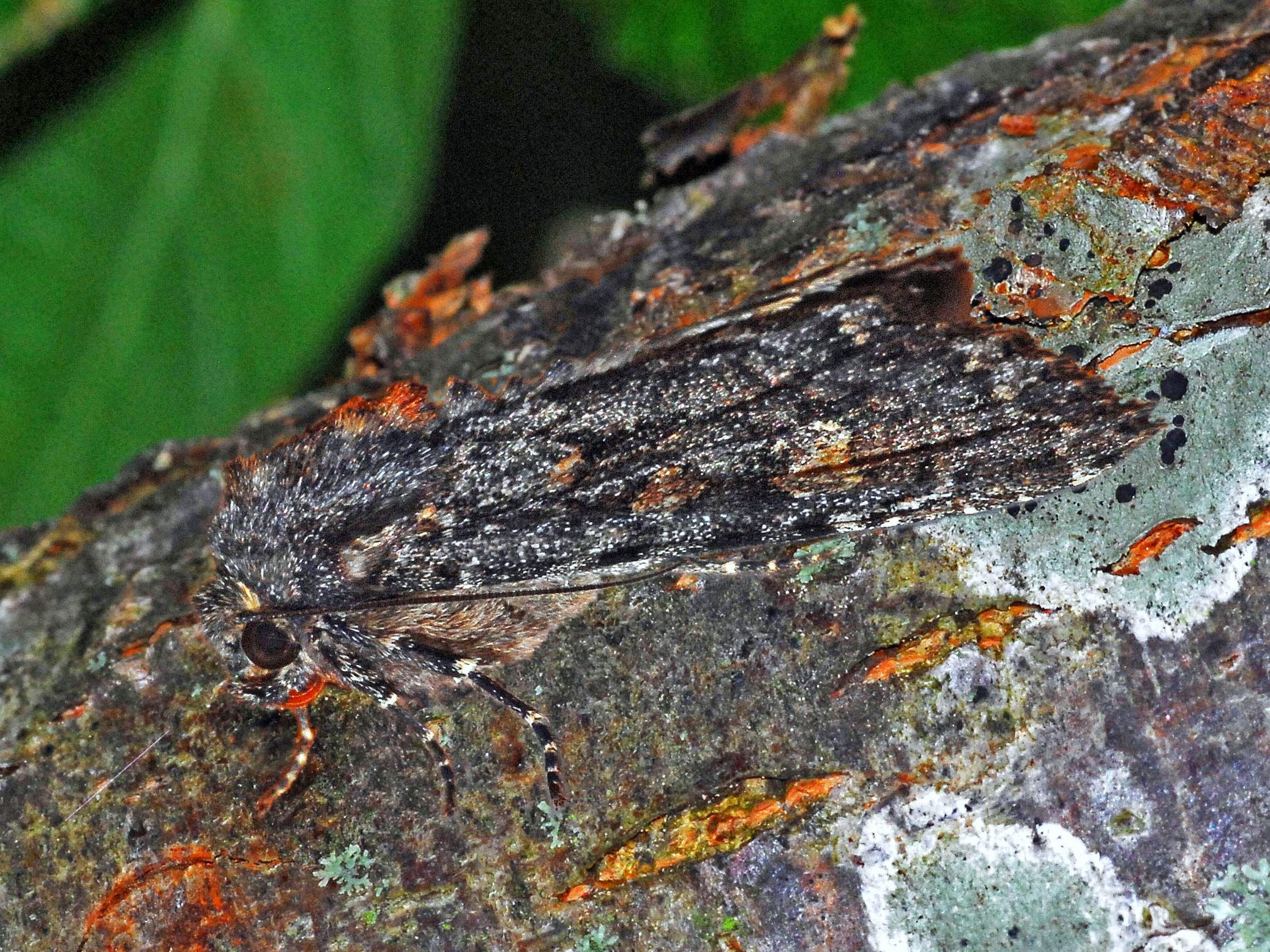
Apamea rubrirena. Side view

Apamea rubrirena has a wingspan of 40–51 mm. These moths are extraordinarily variable in terms of color, wing shape and size. They usually have head and thorax black-brown, with some white hairs and a meta-thopracic rufous crest. The basic color of the forewings vary from pale orange to reddish brown or blackish brown, with reniform rufous patches and transversal indistinct or whitish wavy lines. The hind wings are monochrome, light gray-brown, with the veins clearly protruding. Tarsi are black with whitish rings.

== Biology ==
The caterpillars overwinter and pupate in May or June of the following year. Adults are on wing from fly from mid or late June to August and sometimes September in favourable conditions. There is one generation per year meaning it is a univoltine species.

The larvae feed on a various grasses, including Festuca altissima and Calamagrostis arundinacea. Adults are nocturnal and have been found taking nectar from Rubus, Cirsium oleraceum, Silene vulgaris and Phyteuma.

== Bibliography ==
- Boisduval (1833): Description de quatre nouvelles espèces de Noctuélides. — Annales de la Société entomologique de France 2: 373-378, pl. XIV. Paris (Méquignon-Marvis).
- Treitschke, F. (1825): Die Schmetterlinge von Europa 5 (2): 1-448. Leipzig (Gerhard Fleischer).
- Zille, A., Ronkay, L. & M. Fibiger (2005): Noctuidae europaeae. Volume 8. Apamaeini. — 323 S., Farbtafeln; Sorø (Entomological Press).
