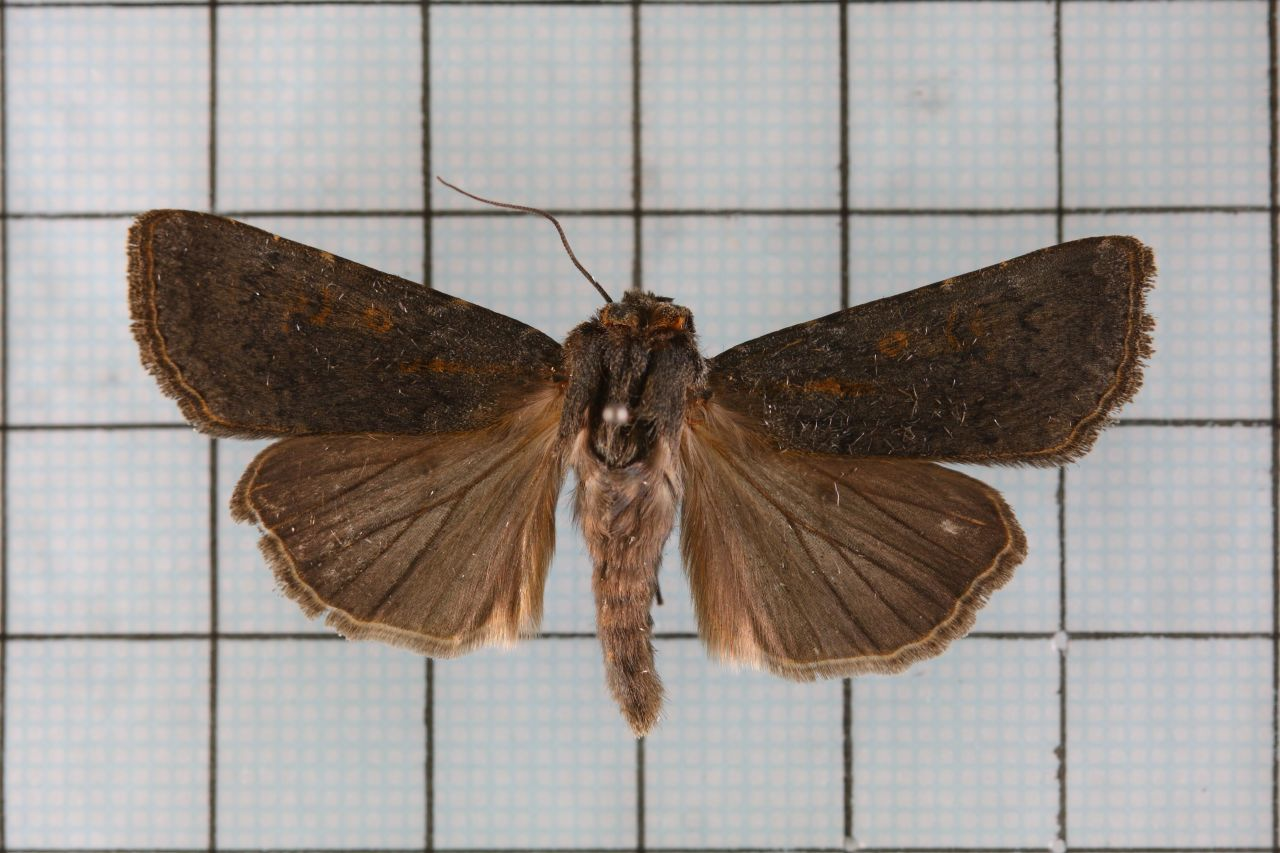

Scientific classification
- Kingdom: Animalia
- Phylum: Arthropoda
- Class: Insecta
- Order: Lepidoptera
- Superfamily: Noctuoidea
- Family: Noctuidae
- Genus: Apamea
- Species: A. taiwana

Binomial name
- Apamea taiwana (Wileman, 1914)

Synonyms
- Noctua taiwana Wileman, 1914; Apamea velutinis (Chang, 1991)

= Apamea taiwana =

Species of moth

Apamea taiwana is a moth of the family Noctuidae. It is found in Taiwan.
