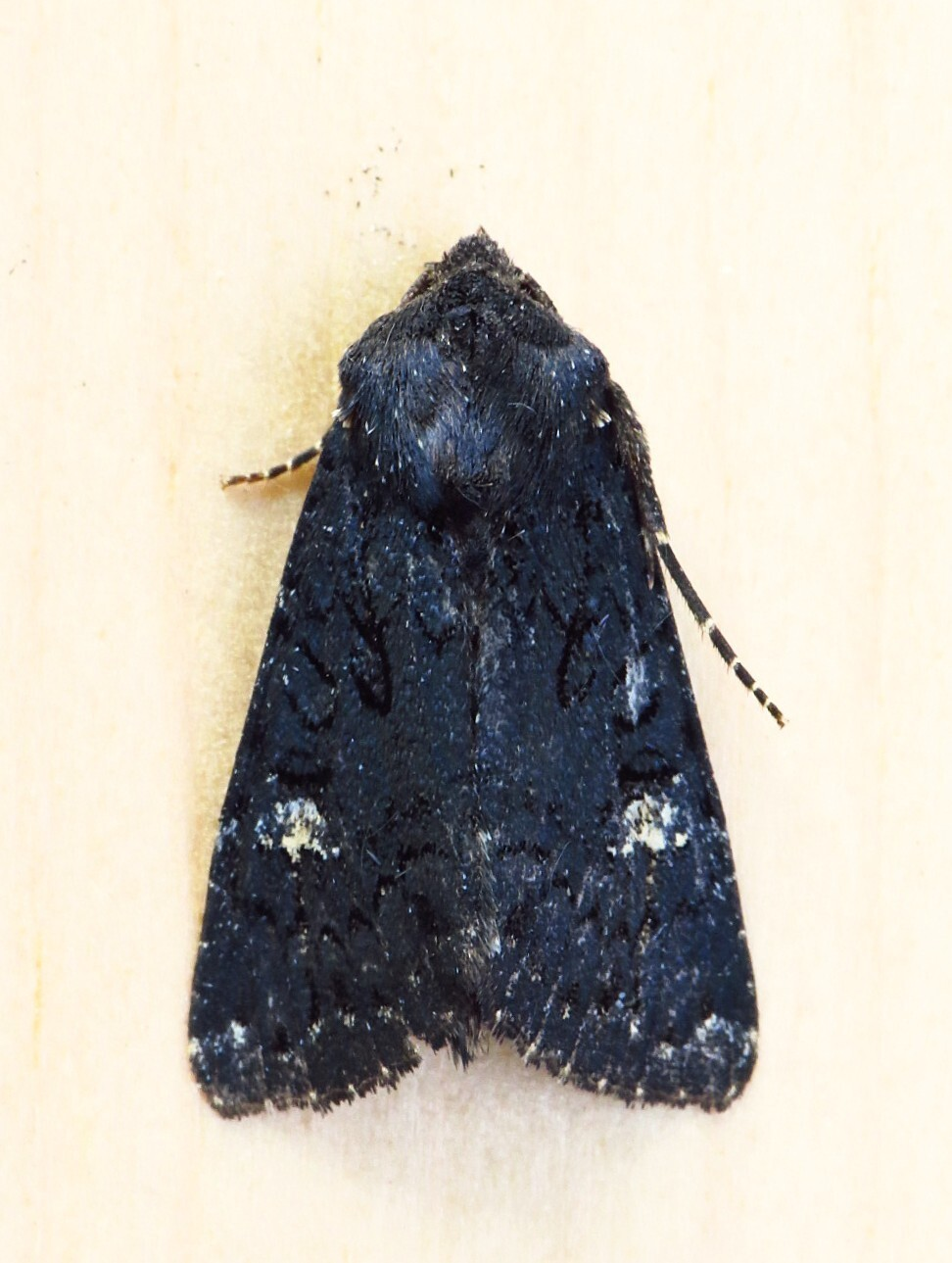

Conservation status
- Unrankable (NatureServe)

Scientific classification
- Kingdom: Animalia
- Phylum: Arthropoda
- Class: Insecta
- Order: Lepidoptera
- Superfamily: Noctuoidea
- Family: Noctuidae
- Genus: Melanapamea; Lafontaine, 2009
- Species: M. mixta

Binomial name
- Melanapamea mixta (Grote, 1881)

Synonyms
- Xylophasia impulsa var. mixta Grote, 1881; Septis mixta (Grote, 1881); Apamea mixta (Grote, 1881)

= Melanapamea =

Melanapamea mixta

Species of moth

Melanapamea is a genus of moths in the family Noctuidae. It is monotypic, being represented by the sole species Melanapamea mixta, the coastal plain apamea moth. It can be found in scattered populations in eastern Canada (Ontario, Quebec, Nova Scotia, New Brunswick) and the Northeastern United States south along the coast towards New Jersey (where it could be found historically) and North Carolina and west to Minnesota. There are also some records further west from New Mexico, northern California, and Oregon. It is a rarely collected species that has been associated with bogs. The larvae probably feed on grasses or sedges.

The forewing length is 15–18 mm (0.59–0.71 in). It can be confused with Apamea impulsa, but is actually clearly different.
