= Apamea robertsoni =

Scientific classification
- Domain: Eukaryota
- Kingdom: Animalia
- Phylum: Arthropoda
- Class: Insecta
- Order: Lepidoptera
- Superfamily: Noctuoidea
- Family: Noctuidae
- Genus: Apamea
- Species: A. robertsoni

Binomial name
- Apamea robertsoni Mikkola and Mustelin, 2006

Species of moth

Apamea robertsoni is a moth of the family Noctuidae. It was described from Southern California in 2006.
