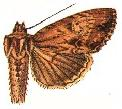

Scientific classification
- Domain: Eukaryota
- Kingdom: Animalia
- Phylum: Arthropoda
- Class: Insecta
- Order: Lepidoptera
- Superfamily: Noctuoidea
- Family: Noctuidae
- Genus: Apamea
- Species: A. cristata

Binomial name
- Apamea cristata (Grote, 1878)

Synonyms
- Hadena cristata Grote, 1878

= Apamea cristata =

Species of moth

Apamea cristata is a moth of the family Noctuidae. It is found in the northeastern United States, including Michigan, New Hampshire, Maryland, New York, and Pennsylvania. In Canada it is found in Quebec and New Brunswick.

The wingspan is about 42 mm.
