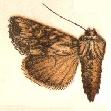

Scientific classification
- Domain: Eukaryota
- Kingdom: Animalia
- Phylum: Arthropoda
- Class: Insecta
- Order: Lepidoptera
- Superfamily: Noctuoidea
- Family: Noctuidae
- Genus: Apamea
- Species: A. cinefacta

Binomial name
- Apamea cinefacta Grote, 1881

Synonyms
- Hadena cinefacta

= Apamea cinefacta =

Species of moth

Apamea cinefacta is a moth of the family Noctuidae first described by Augustus Radcliffe Grote in 1881. It is found in western North America, including in Washington and Alberta.

== Subspecies ==
- Apamea cinefacta albertae
- Apamea cinefacta cinefacta
