= Apamea siskiyou =

Scientific classification
- Domain: Eukaryota
- Kingdom: Animalia
- Phylum: Arthropoda
- Class: Insecta
- Order: Lepidoptera
- Superfamily: Noctuoidea
- Family: Noctuidae
- Tribe: Apameini
- Genus: Apamea
- Species: A. siskiyou

Binomial name
- Apamea siskiyou Mikkola & Lafontaine, 2009

Species of moth

Apamea siskiyou is a species of cutworm or dart moth in the family Noctuidae. It is found in North America.

The MONA or Hodges number for Apamea siskiyou is 9334.1.
