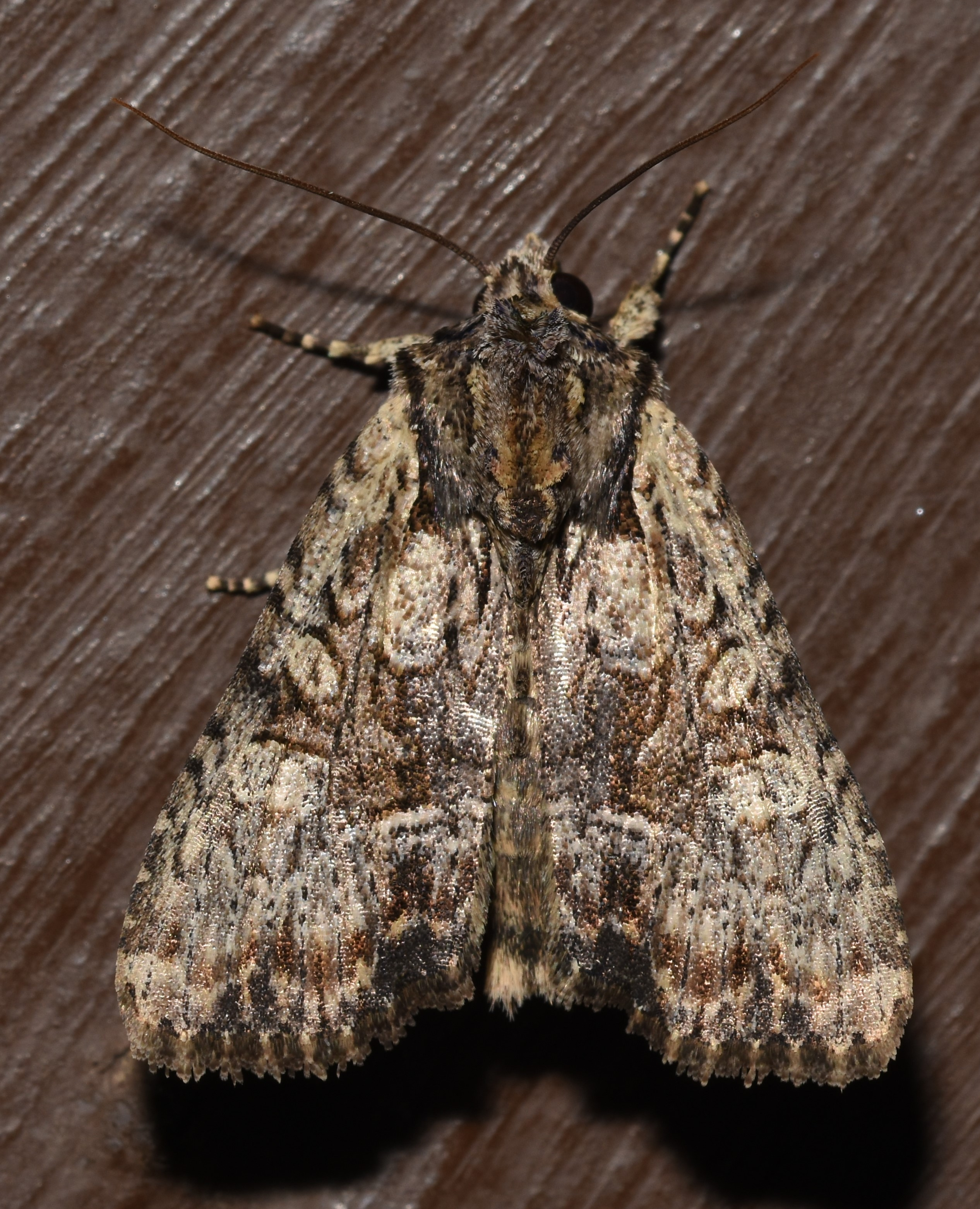

Scientific classification
- Kingdom: Animalia
- Phylum: Arthropoda
- Clade: Pancrustacea
- Class: Insecta
- Order: Lepidoptera
- Superfamily: Noctuoidea
- Family: Noctuidae
- Genus: Apamea
- Species: A. quinteri

Binomial name
- Apamea quinteri Mikkola & Lafontaine, 2009

= Apamea quinteri =

Species of moth

Apamea quinteri is a species of cutworm or dart moth in the family Noctuidae. It is found in North America.
