= Apamea chinensis =

Scientific classification
- Kingdom: Animalia
- Phylum: Arthropoda
- Clade: Pancrustacea
- Class: Insecta
- Order: Lepidoptera
- Superfamily: Noctuoidea
- Family: Noctuidae
- Genus: Apamea
- Species: A. chinensis

Binomial name
- Apamea chinensis (Leech, 1900)

Species of moth

Apamea chinensis is a moth of the family Noctuidae.
