= Apamea contradicta =

Northern banded Quaker

Scientific classification
- Domain: Eukaryota
- Kingdom: Animalia
- Phylum: Arthropoda
- Class: Insecta
- Order: Lepidoptera
- Superfamily: Noctuoidea
- Family: Noctuidae
- Genus: Apamea
- Species: A. contradicta

Binomial name
- Apamea contradicta Smith, 1895

Synonyms
- Xylophasia contradicta; Hadena exornata Möschler, 1860; Trichoplexia exornata

Species of moth

Apamea contradicta, the northern banded Quaker, is a moth of the family Noctuidae. The species was first described by Smith in 1895. It is native to northern North America, where it can be found across southern Canada from Newfoundland and Labrador west to Alberta and south to Colorado.

This wingspan is 38–45 mm. The forewings are orange brown with curving black lines, and the hindwings are grayish. The moth flies from June to July depending on the location.
