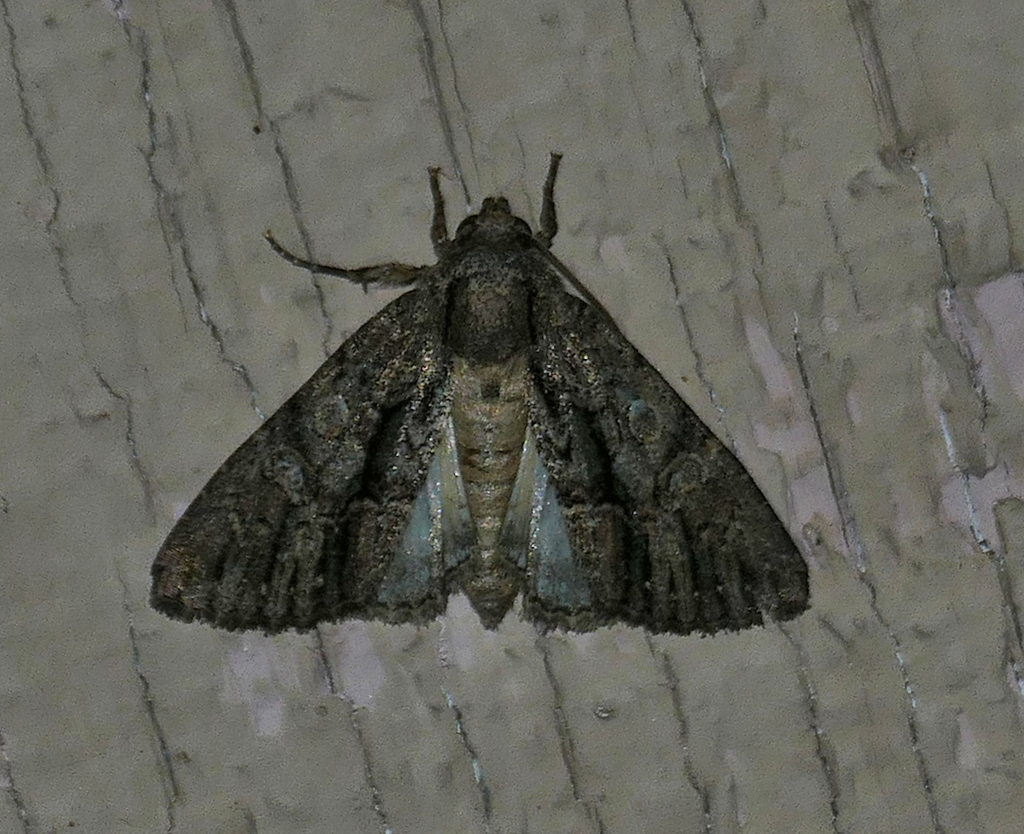

Conservation status
- Apparently Secure (NatureServe)

Scientific classification
- Kingdom: Animalia
- Phylum: Arthropoda
- Class: Insecta
- Order: Lepidoptera
- Superfamily: Noctuoidea
- Family: Noctuidae
- Genus: Apamea
- Species: A. burgessi

Binomial name
- Apamea burgessi (Morrison, 1874)

Synonyms
- Luceria burgessi Morrison, 1874; Crymodes burgessi (Morrison, 1874); Apamea ona (Smith, 1909)

= Apamea burgessi =

Species of moth

Apamea burgessi is a moth of the family Noctuidae. It is native to central North America, where it can be found throughout the Great Plains and Great Basin. Its distribution extends north to Alberta and south to Texas. There is a disjunct population on the East Coast of the United States.

The wingspan is 38–40 mm. The forewing is streaked tan and gray and the hindwing is white. The flight season is in September and October.

== Subspecies ==
- Apamea burgessi burgessi (Morrison, 1874)
- Apamea burgessi leucoptera Mikkola, 2009
- Apamea burgessi ona (Smith, 1909)
