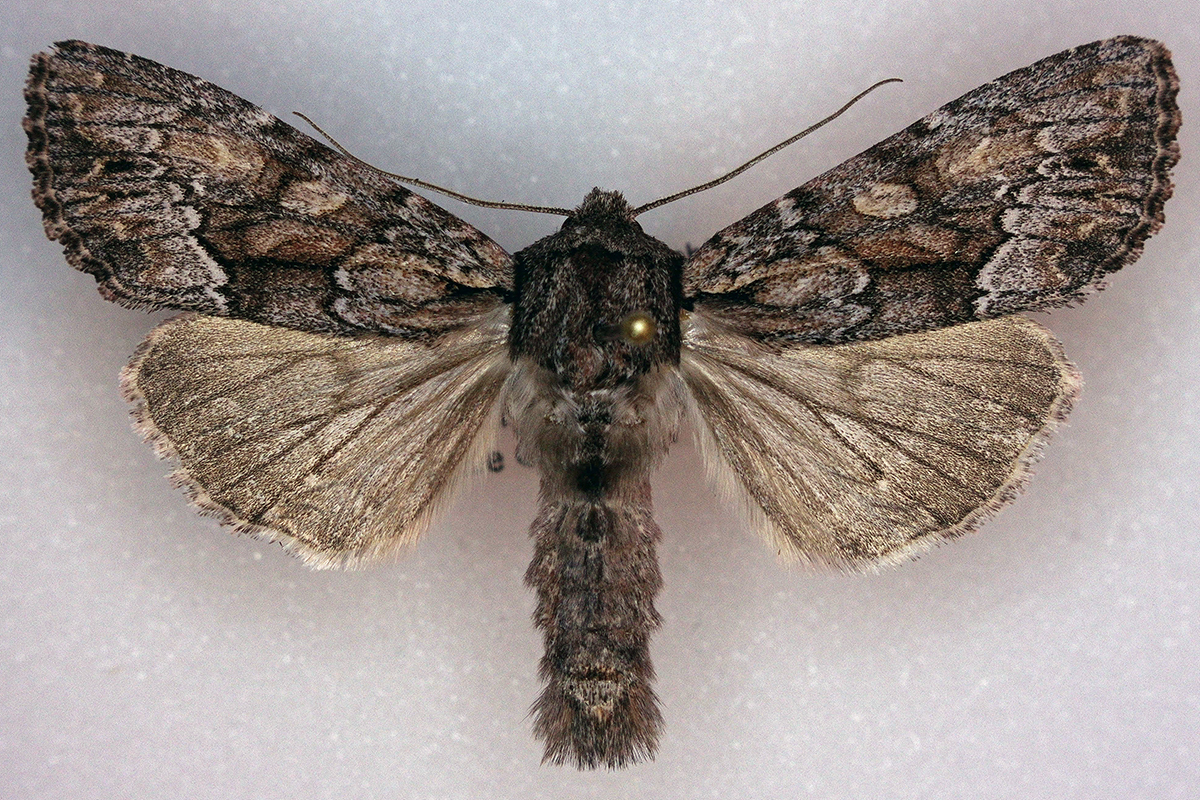

Scientific classification
- Domain: Eukaryota
- Kingdom: Animalia
- Phylum: Arthropoda
- Class: Insecta
- Order: Lepidoptera
- Superfamily: Noctuoidea
- Family: Noctuidae
- Genus: Apamea
- Species: A. centralis

Binomial name
- Apamea centralis Smith, 1891

Synonyms
- Xylophasia centralis

= Apamea centralis =

Species of moth

Apamea centralis is a species of moth in the family Noctuidae that was first described by Smith in 1891. It is native to North America, where its range extends from California to Alberta.
