= Apamea vultuosa =

Conservation status
- Secure (NatureServe)

Scientific classification
- Domain: Eukaryota
- Kingdom: Animalia
- Phylum: Arthropoda
- Class: Insecta
- Order: Lepidoptera
- Superfamily: Noctuoidea
- Family: Noctuidae
- Genus: Apamea
- Species: A. vultuosa

Binomial name
- Apamea vultuosa Grote, 1875

Synonyms
- Hadena vultuosa

Species of moth

Apamea vultuosa, the airy apamea, is a moth of the family Noctuidae native to North America.

== Description ==
Adults are on wing from June to July depending on the location. The larvae feed on grasses in the family Poaceae.

== Subspecies ==
- Apamea vultuosa multicolor (Dyar, 1904)
- Apamea vultuosa vultuosa (Grote, 1875)
