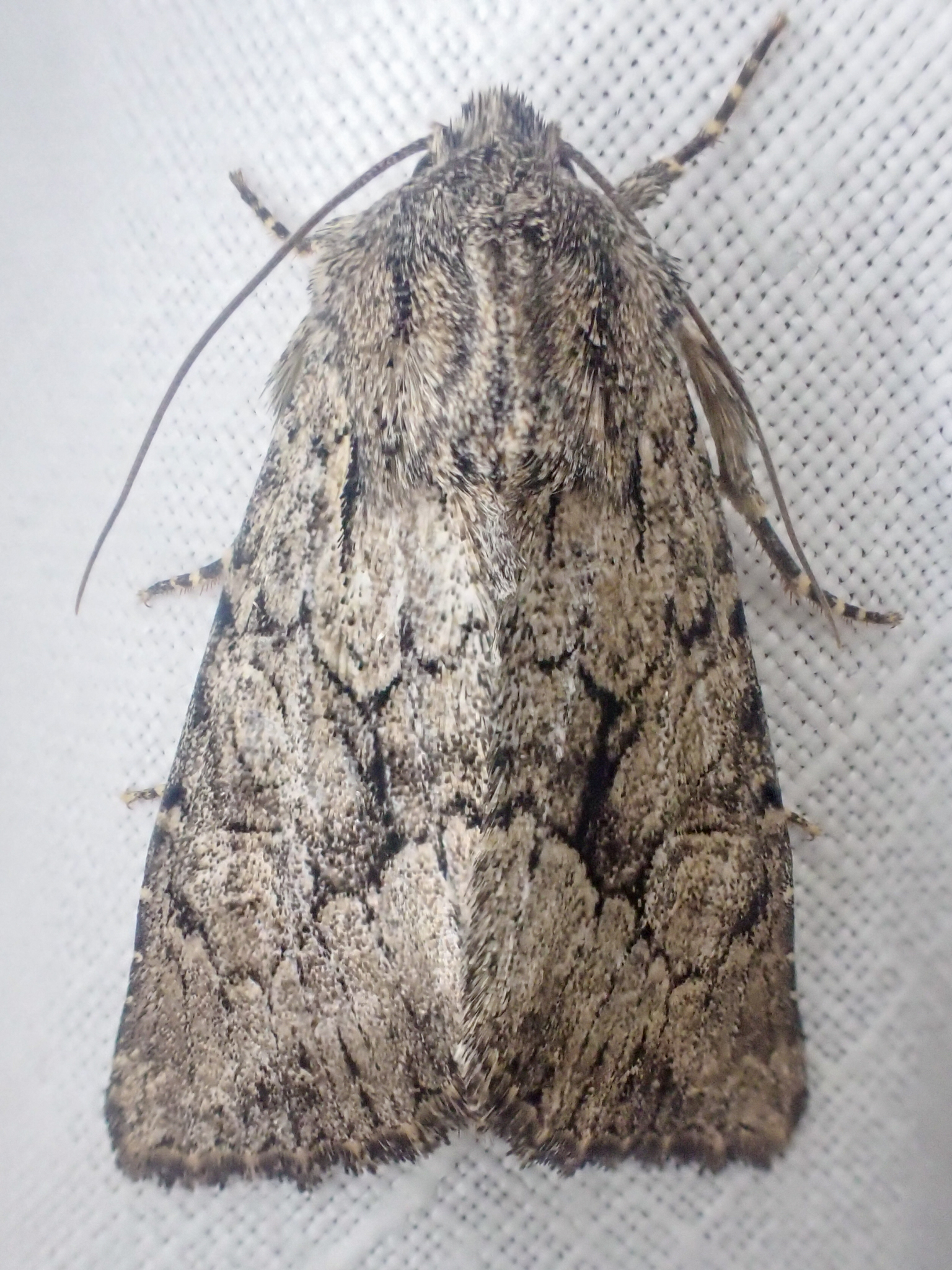

Scientific classification
- Domain: Eukaryota
- Kingdom: Animalia
- Phylum: Arthropoda
- Class: Insecta
- Order: Lepidoptera
- Superfamily: Noctuoidea
- Family: Noctuidae
- Genus: Apamea
- Species: A. longula

Binomial name
- Apamea longula Grote, 1879

Synonyms
- Crymodes longula; Hadena longula

= Apamea longula =

Species of moth

Apamea longula is a species of moth in the family Noctuidae that was first described by Augustus Radcliffe Grote in 1879. It is found in western North America, mostly from California to the Great Plains. There are also a few records from areas north, including Alberta, Yukon, and Alaska.

The forewing length is 17 to 22 millimetres.
