= Apamea digitula =

Scientific classification
- Domain: Eukaryota
- Kingdom: Animalia
- Phylum: Arthropoda
- Class: Insecta
- Order: Lepidoptera
- Superfamily: Noctuoidea
- Family: Noctuidae
- Genus: Apamea
- Species: A. digitula

Binomial name
- Apamea digitula Mikkola and Mustelin, 2006

Species of moth

Apamea digitula is a moth of the family Noctuidae. It was described from the Laguna Mountains of San Diego County, California, in 2006. It is also known from western Oregon.

The moth has a forewing 16–19 millimetres (0.63–0.75 in) long and is generally clay-colored (tan-gray) with areas tinged with red-brown. The living moth may have a greenish cast. There may be tufts on some abdominal segments. The male has beaded antennae.

The moth inhabits various habitat types, including moist grassland, coastal rainforest, oak savanna, disturbed cropland and urban areas, and the hardwood and coniferous forests of the Cascades.
