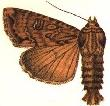

Scientific classification
- Domain: Eukaryota
- Kingdom: Animalia
- Phylum: Arthropoda
- Class: Insecta
- Order: Lepidoptera
- Superfamily: Noctuoidea
- Family: Noctuidae
- Genus: Apamea
- Species: A. apamiformis

Binomial name
- Apamea apamiformis Guenée, 1852

Synonyms
- Xylophasia apamiformis; Hadena contenta

= Apamea apamiformis =

Species of moth

Apamea apamiformis, known by the common names rice worm moth, riceworm, and wild rice worm, is a moth of the family Noctuidae. It is found in North America, including Wisconsin, New York, Minnesota and eastern Canada, with imperiled or critically imperiled populations in Maryland and Indiana, respectively, and a vulnerable population in New Jersey.

== Description ==
The adult's wingspan is about 39 millimetres (1.5 in). Adults are dimorphic, with a dark form and a light form distinguished by the coloration of the forewing. The reniform spot is dark with white scales along that spot's concave border (facing the forewing's outer margin).

== Life cycle and behavior ==
Adults are on wing from June to August depending on the location. They feed on nectar from common milkweed flowers.

Eggs are laid in the florets of wild rice from late June or early July until early August. The eggs hatch after eight or nine days and the larvae eat the ovary of their floret before ballooning away on self-spun silk threads. By the third instar they begin to consume maturing grain in the flower heads of the wild rice. Starting in September the larvae, now in the sixth or seventh instar, will either bury themselves in soil or will have already bored themselves into the rice stalks, where they overwinter before emerging in mid-spring to feed, moult into the eighth instar and subsequently pupate.

== Economic importance ==
The larva is known as the most serious insect pest of cultivated wild rice in Minnesota, and perhaps the entire Upper Midwest of the United States. The larvae may be mistaken for rice grains during harvesting.
