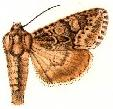

Scientific classification
- Domain: Eukaryota
- Kingdom: Animalia
- Phylum: Arthropoda
- Class: Insecta
- Order: Lepidoptera
- Superfamily: Noctuoidea
- Family: Noctuidae
- Genus: Apamea
- Species: A. pallifera

Binomial name
- Apamea pallifera (Grote, 1877)

Synonyms
- Polia pallifera Grote, 1877; Andropolia pallifera (Grote, 1877)

= Apamea pallifera =

Species of moth

Apamea pallifera is a moth in the family Noctuidae. It is found in North America.

Andropolia pallifera is listed as a valid name by some sources.
