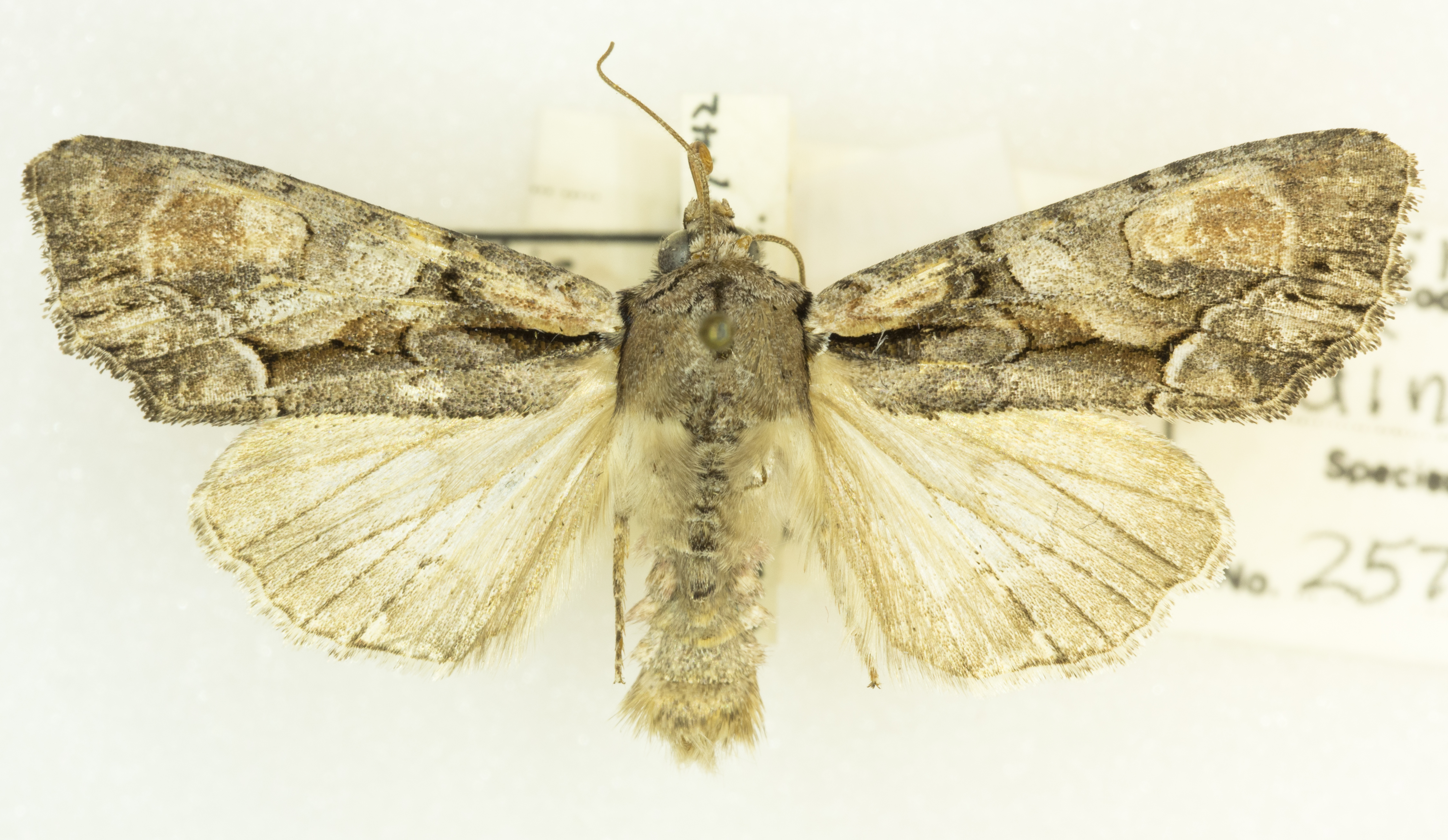

Scientific classification
- Domain: Eukaryota
- Kingdom: Animalia
- Phylum: Arthropoda
- Class: Insecta
- Order: Lepidoptera
- Superfamily: Noctuoidea
- Family: Noctuidae
- Genus: Apamea
- Species: A. spaldingi

Binomial name
- Apamea spaldingi Smith, 1909

Synonyms
- Hyppa spaldingi; Trachea umbrifacta

= Apamea spaldingi =

Species of moth

Apamea spaldingi, or Spalding's Quaker, is a moth of the family Noctuidae. The species was first described by John Bernhardt Smith in 1909. It is native to interior western North America.

The forewing length is up to 20 millimetres (0.79 in). It is mottled and streaked grey with lighter hindwings and is somewhat variable. The flight season is early for Apamea species, beginning in April in some areas.
