= Apamea griveaudi =

Scientific classification
- Kingdom: Animalia
- Phylum: Arthropoda
- Class: Insecta
- Order: Lepidoptera
- Superfamily: Noctuoidea
- Family: Noctuidae
- Genus: Apamea
- Species: A. griveaudi

Binomial name
- Apamea griveaudi Viette, 1967

Species of moth

Apamea griveaudi is a moth of the family Noctuidae. It is found in northern Madagascar.

Its wingspan ranges from 40 to 55 mm, and the length of the forewings is 19.5 to 27 mm. This species is also nocturnal.

The adult moth has a wingspan of about 30-35 mm, and its forewings are pale yellow or ochre in color, with distinctive dark markings. The hindwings are whitish with a faint yellow tint. The caterpillar of Apamea griveaudi feeds on various grasses and herbaceous plants.
