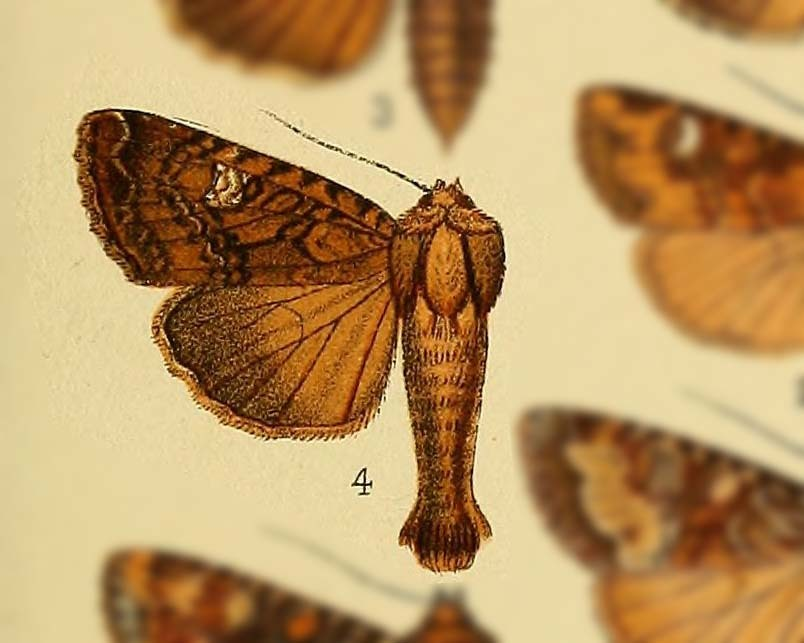

Scientific classification
- Kingdom: Animalia
- Phylum: Arthropoda
- Clade: Pancrustacea
- Class: Insecta
- Order: Lepidoptera
- Superfamily: Noctuoidea
- Family: Noctuidae
- Genus: Apamea
- Species: A. submarginata

Binomial name
- Apamea submarginata (Leech, 1900)

Synonyms
- Genoveva submarginata Zilli et al., 2009; Parastichtis submarginata Hampson, 1908; Xylophasia submarginata Leech, 1900

= Apamea submarginata =

Species of moth

Apamea submarginata is a species of owlet moth. It was first described in 1900 by J. H. Leech, having collected a male specimen from Mount Emei in China.
