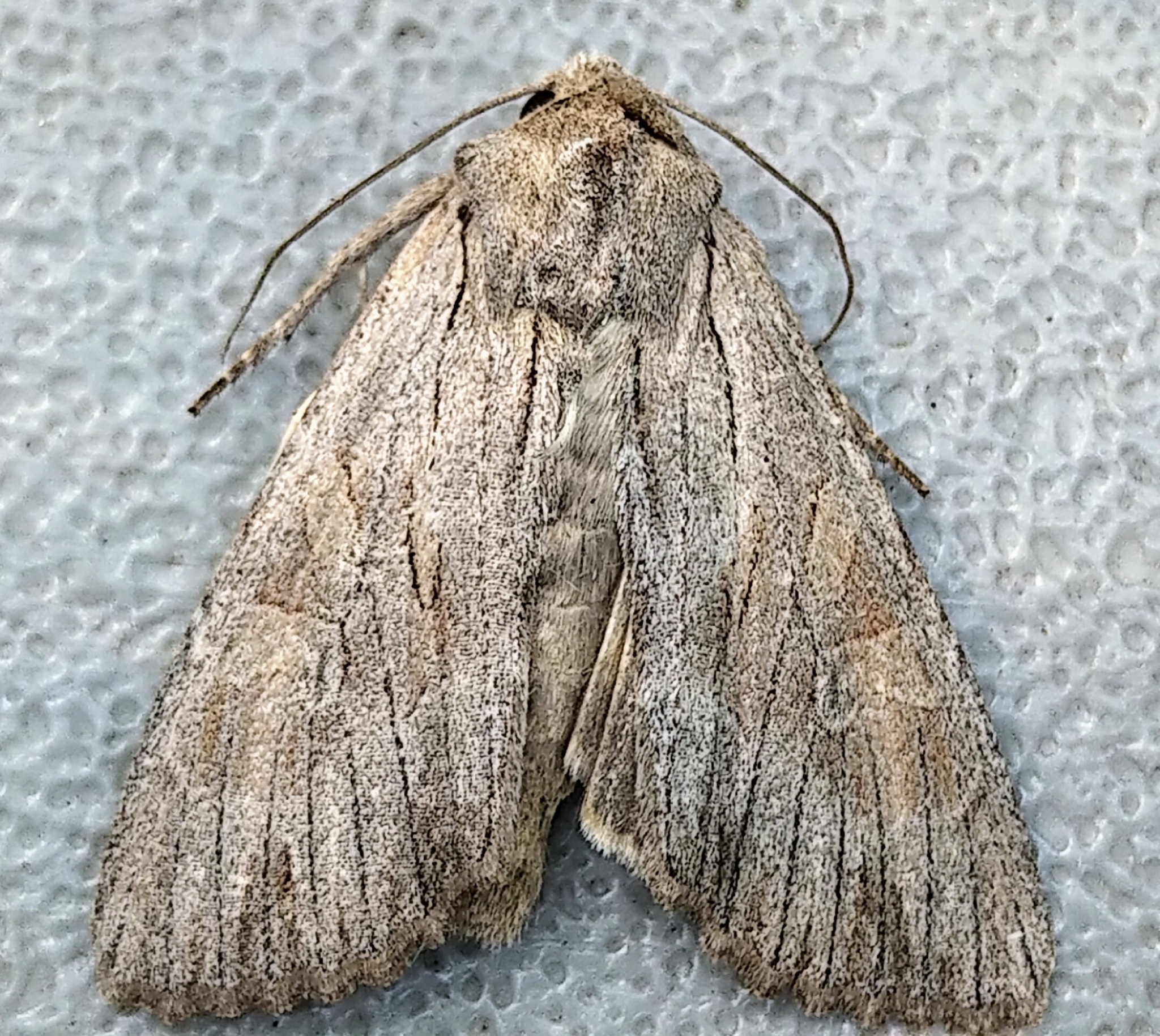

Scientific classification
- Domain: Eukaryota
- Kingdom: Animalia
- Phylum: Arthropoda
- Class: Insecta
- Order: Lepidoptera
- Superfamily: Noctuoidea
- Family: Noctuidae
- Genus: Apamea
- Species: A. acera

Binomial name
- Apamea acera (Smith, 1900)

Synonyms
- Polia acera Smith, 1900; Andropolia acera

= Apamea acera =

Species of moth

Apamea acera is a species of moth in the family Noctuidae. It is native to western North America, where it can be found from British Columbia south to California and east to Utah.

The wingspan is about 46 mm.
