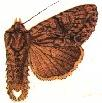

Conservation status
- Apparently Secure (NatureServe)

Scientific classification
- Domain: Eukaryota
- Kingdom: Animalia
- Phylum: Arthropoda
- Class: Insecta
- Order: Lepidoptera
- Superfamily: Noctuoidea
- Family: Noctuidae
- Genus: Apamea
- Species: A. cariosa

Binomial name
- Apamea cariosa (Guenée, 1852)

Synonyms
- Xylophasia cariosa Guenée, 1852; Hadena idonea Grote, 1882; Hadena cluna Strecker, 1898; Apamea dionea (Smith, 1899)

= Apamea cariosa =

Species of moth

Apamea cariosa, commonly called the nondescript dagger moth, is a moth of the family Noctuidae. It is found in the northeastern United States, including New York, Maryland, Indiana and Virginia. In Canada it is found in Ontario, Quebec, New Brunswick, Alberta, and Manitoba.

The wingspan is about 35 mm.
