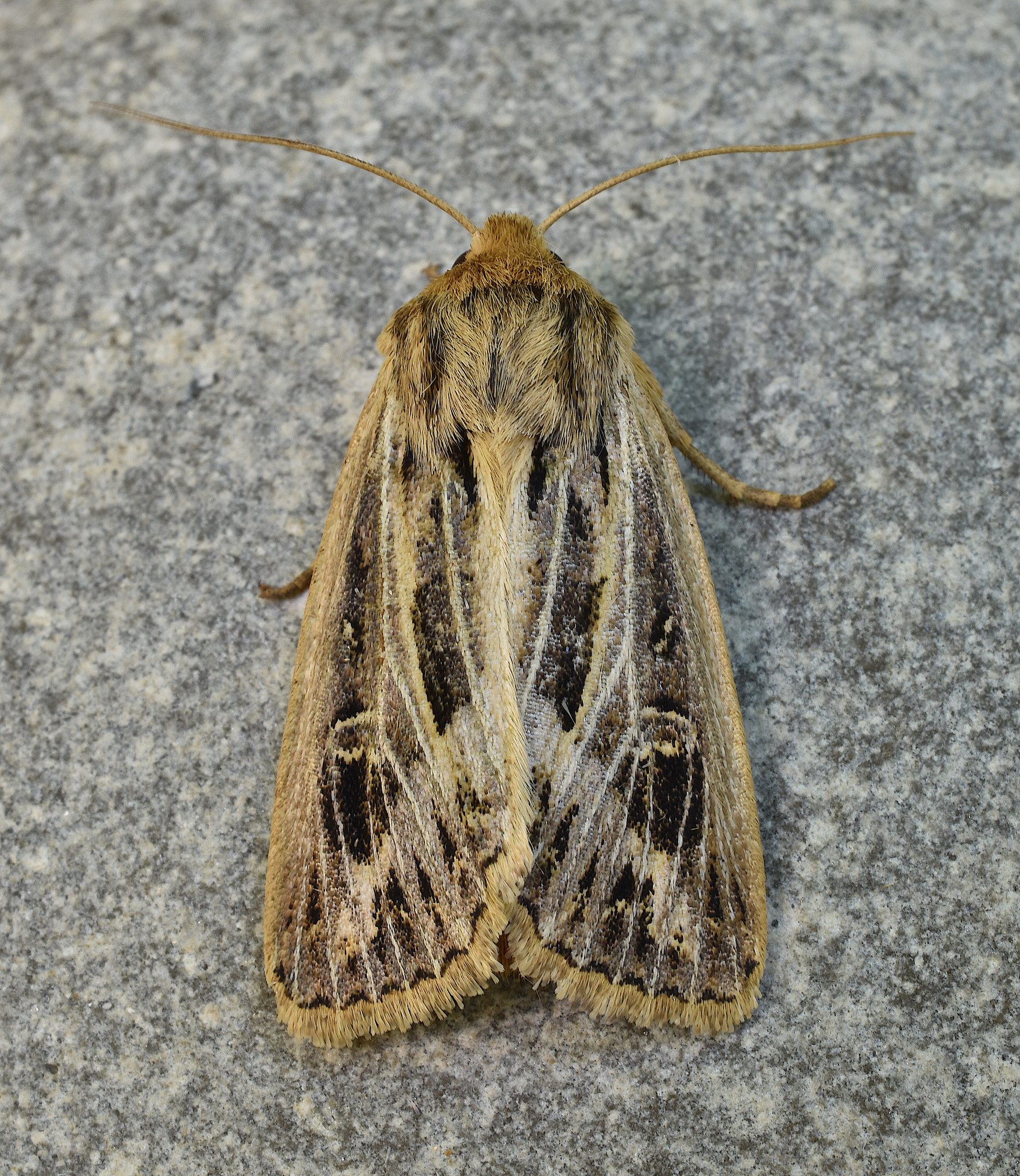

Scientific classification
- Domain: Eukaryota
- Kingdom: Animalia
- Phylum: Arthropoda
- Class: Insecta
- Order: Lepidoptera
- Superfamily: Noctuoidea
- Family: Noctuidae
- Genus: Apamea
- Species: A. niveivenosa

Binomial name
- Apamea niveivenosa Grote, 1879

Synonyms
- Agrotis niveivenosa; Agrotis viralis; Apamea extensa (Smith, 1905); Apamea obscura (Barnes & McDunnough, 1911); Protagrotis niveivenosa

= Apamea niveivenosa =

Snowy-veined apamea

Species of moth

Apamea niveivenosa, the snowy-veined apamea, is a moth of the family Noctuidae. The species was first described by Augustus Radcliffe Grote in 1879. It is native to northern North America, where it can be found across Canada and south to California.

The larva is a subterranean cutworm that feeds on grasses. It is a pest of grain crops in interior North America.

== Subspecies ==
- Apamea niveivenosa niveivenosa
- Apamea niveivenosa obscuroides Poole, 1989
