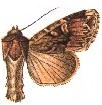

Scientific classification
- Kingdom: Animalia
- Phylum: Arthropoda
- Class: Insecta
- Order: Lepidoptera
- Superfamily: Noctuoidea
- Family: Noctuidae
- Genus: Apamea
- Species: A. antennata

Binomial name
- Apamea antennata Smith, 1891

Synonyms
- Xylophasia antennata

= Apamea antennata =

Species of moth

Apamea antennata is a moth of the family Noctuidae. It is widespread in the forests of western North America.

This wingspan is about 44 mm. The adult flies in early and midsummer. The larva feeds on grasses.

== Subspecies ==
- Apamea antennata antennata
- Apamea antennata purpurissata (British Columbia)
