= Apamea atrosuffusa =

Scientific classification
- Domain: Eukaryota
- Kingdom: Animalia
- Phylum: Arthropoda
- Class: Insecta
- Order: Lepidoptera
- Superfamily: Noctuoidea
- Family: Noctuidae
- Genus: Apamea
- Species: A. atrosuffusa

Binomial name
- Apamea atrosuffusa (Barnes & McDunnough, 1913)

Synonyms
- Apamea grotei (Barnes & McDunnough, 1914)

Species of moth

Apamea atrosuffusa is a species of cutworm or dart moth in the family Noctuidae first described by William Barnes and James Halliday McDunnough in 1913. It is found in North America.

The MONA or Hodges number for Apamea atrosuffusa is 9336.
