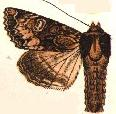

Scientific classification
- Domain: Eukaryota
- Kingdom: Animalia
- Phylum: Arthropoda
- Class: Insecta
- Order: Lepidoptera
- Superfamily: Noctuoidea
- Family: Noctuidae
- Genus: Apamea
- Species: A. albina

Binomial name
- Apamea albina (Grote, 1874)

Synonyms
- Hadena albina Grote, 1874

= Apamea albina =

Species of moth

Apamea albina is a moth of the family Noctuidae. It is native to California and Oregon in the United States. It lives in forests and oak savanna on serpentine soils.

The moth has a forewing length of 20 to 23 millimeters. It is red-brown in color with areas of white, black, and blue-gray. The hindwing is yellow-gray. The head and thorax are dark brown.
