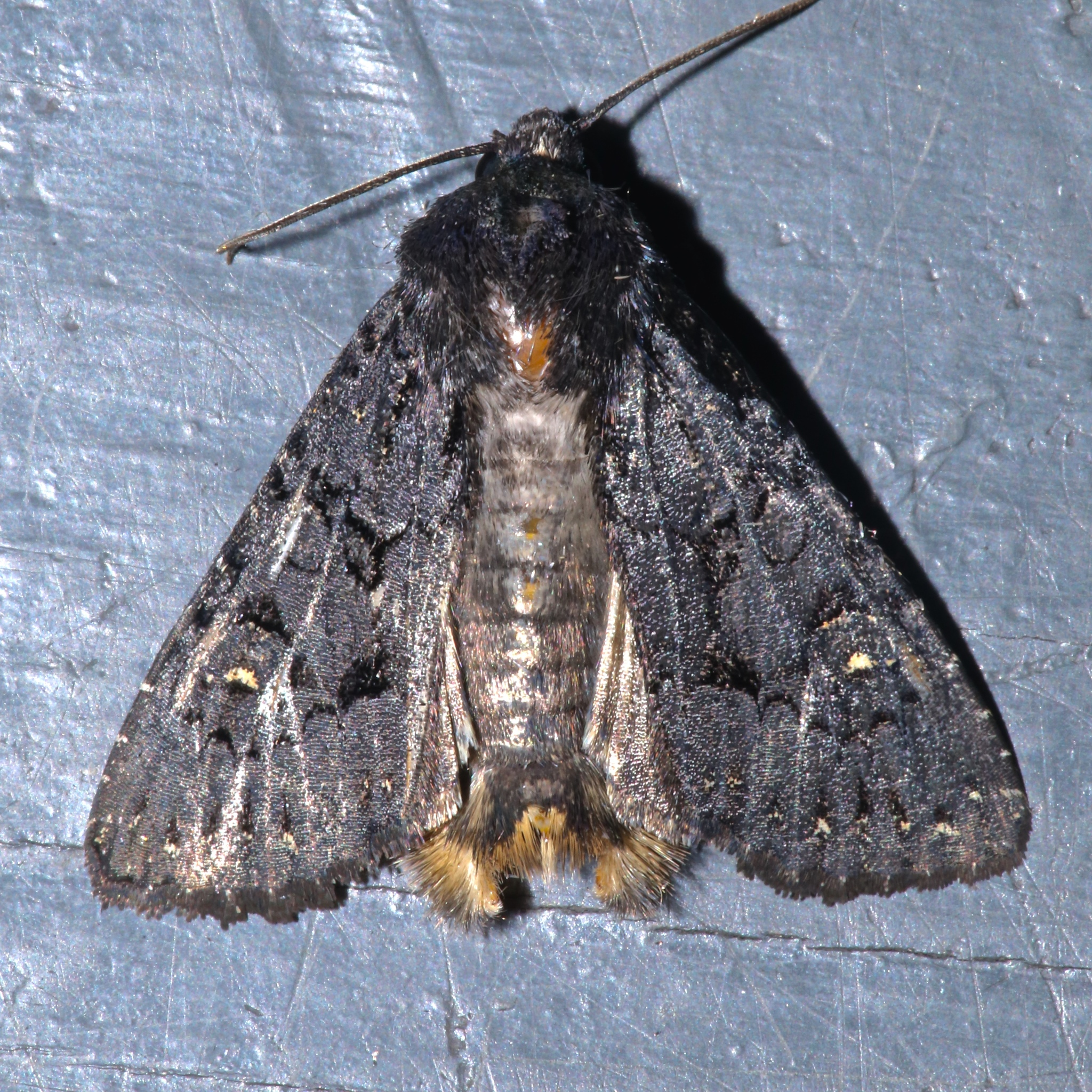

Scientific classification
- Domain: Eukaryota
- Kingdom: Animalia
- Phylum: Arthropoda
- Class: Insecta
- Order: Lepidoptera
- Superfamily: Noctuoidea
- Family: Noctuidae
- Genus: Apamea
- Species: A. impulsa

Binomial name
- Apamea impulsa Guenée, 1852

Synonyms
- Mamestra impulsa

= Apamea impulsa =

Species of moth

Apamea impulsa is a moth of the family Noctuidae. It is native to North America, where it can be found from coast to coast across southern Canada and the northern United States.

The wingspan is about 34 mm. The moth flies from June to August depending on the location. There is one generation per year.

The larva feeds on grasses.
