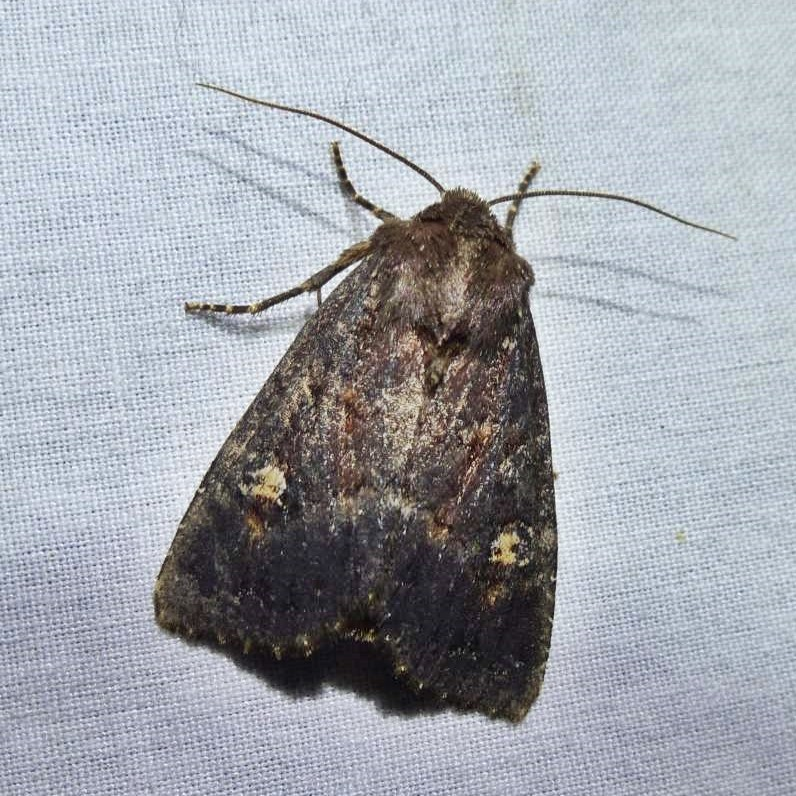

Scientific classification
- Kingdom: Animalia
- Phylum: Arthropoda
- Class: Insecta
- Order: Lepidoptera
- Superfamily: Noctuoidea
- Family: Noctuidae
- Genus: Apamea
- Species: A. dubitans

Binomial name
- Apamea dubitans Walker, 1856

Synonyms
- Mamestra dubitans; Apamea insignata; Hadena sputator; Hadena sputatrix; Agroperina dubitans

= Apamea dubitans =

Doubtful apamea

Species of moth

Apamea dubitans, commonly known as the doubtful apamea, is a species of moth in the family Noctuidae. It is widely distributed in North America.

The wingspan is about 40 mm. Adults are on wing from June to September depending on the location.

The larvae feed on various grasses.
