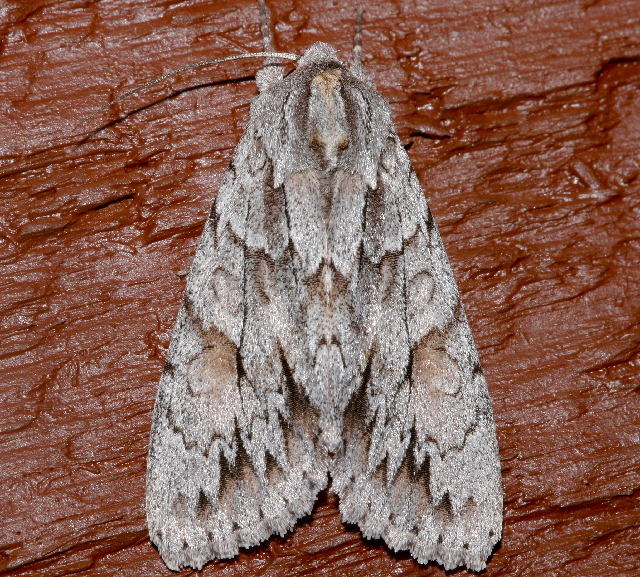
- Andropolia theodori

Scientific classification
- Kingdom: Animalia
- Phylum: Arthropoda
- Class: Insecta
- Order: Lepidoptera
- Superfamily: Noctuoidea
- Family: Noctuidae
- Subtribe: Antitypina
- Genus: Andropolia; Grote, 1895

= Andropolia =

Genus of moths

Andropolia is a genus of moths of the family Noctuidae.

== Species ==
- Andropolia aedon (Grote, 1880)
- Andropolia contacta (Walker, 1856)
- Andropolia diversilineata (Grote, 1877)
- Andropolia extincta (Smith, 1900)
- Andropolia olga Smith, 1911
- Andropolia olorina (Grote, 1876)
- Andropolia theodori (Grote, 1878)

== Former species ==
- Andropolia dispar is now Fishia dispar (Smith, 1900)
- Andropolia lichena is now Aseptis lichena (Barnes & McDunnough, 1912)
- Andropolia pallifera is now Apamea pallifera (Grote, 1877)
