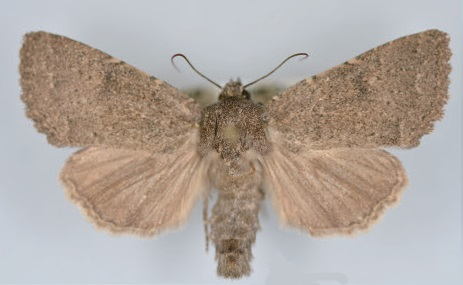
- Male
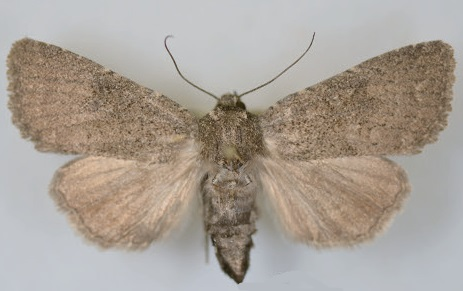
- Female

Scientific classification
- Domain: Eukaryota
- Kingdom: Animalia
- Phylum: Arthropoda
- Class: Insecta
- Order: Lepidoptera
- Superfamily: Noctuoidea
- Family: Noctuidae
- Genus: Aseptis
- Species: A. ethnica

Binomial name
- Aseptis ethnica (J. B. Smith, 1899)

Synonyms
- Hadena ethnica J. B. Smith, 1899

= Aseptis ethnica =

Species of moth

Aseptis ethnica is a moth of the family Noctuidae first described by John Bernhardt Smith in 1899. It is found in North America in Arizona, California, western Oregon, and Baja California Norte in Mexico. The habitat consists of open pine and oak forest and mountain chaparral, mostly at elevations of above 1500 meters in southern California, but at lower elevations further north.

The wingspan is 38–43.5 mm. Adults from southern California have dull grayish-tan forewings with a grainy appearance. In central and northern California and Oregon, it is dull deeper brown, sometimes with some reddish tones surrounding the dark-filled reniform and orbicular spots. Most adults are much less contrasting than Aseptis fumeola and lack its contrasting black-outlined spots, patchy dark shading, and reddish postreniform patch. Adults are on wing from early May to August.

The larvae feed on Arctostaphylos species.
