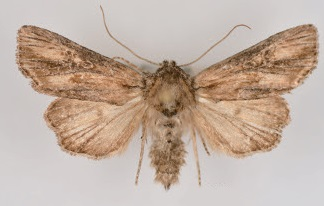
- Male
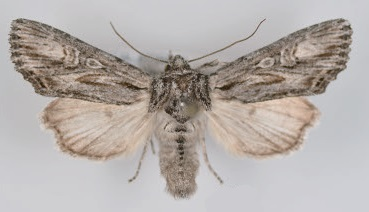
- Female

Scientific classification
- Domain: Eukaryota
- Kingdom: Animalia
- Phylum: Arthropoda
- Class: Insecta
- Order: Lepidoptera
- Superfamily: Noctuoidea
- Family: Noctuidae
- Genus: Aseptis
- Species: A. susquesa

Binomial name
- Aseptis susquesa (J. B. Smith, 1908)

Synonyms
- Hadena susquesa J. B. Smith, 1908; Trachea monica Barnes & McDunnough, 1918; Aseptis monica

= Aseptis susquesa =

Species of moth

Aseptis susquesa is a moth of the family Noctuidae first described by John Bernhardt Smith in 1908. It is found in Arizona, California and Baja California in Mexico, at least as far south as Ensenada. The habitat consists of rocky areas in the mountain-desert transition zone and high desert.

The wingspan is about 31.4 mm. The forewings are streaky medium gray to dark brown gray with streaks of warm light orange tan to yellow tan at the postreniform patch, in the fold, and in the large pointed claviform spot. A thin tan line parallels the margin near the anal angle. The reniform and orbicular spots are outlined in black with paler peripheral and darker central scaling. The distal forewing is streaky due to black veins and pale-gray scales and the transverse lines are obsolete. The hindwings are light whitish gray with brown-gray marginal shading and dark veins, darker in females. Adults are on wing from late March to early June.

The larvae feed on Artemisia californica and Ericameria laricifolia. They are dark green marked with white.
