= Rhizagrotis stylata =

Scientific classification
- Domain: Eukaryota
- Kingdom: Animalia
- Phylum: Arthropoda
- Class: Insecta
- Order: Lepidoptera
- Superfamily: Noctuoidea
- Family: Noctuidae
- Genus: Rhizagrotis
- Species: R. stylata

Binomial name
- Rhizagrotis stylata J. B. Smith, 1893

Synonyms
- Cerapoda stylata J. B. Smith, 1893

Species of moth

Rhizagrotis stylata is a moth of the family Noctuidae first described by John Bernhardt Smith in 1893. It is found in North America from south-eastern Alberta south to at least Arizona.

The wingspan is 38–40 mm.

== Subspecies ==
- Rhizagrotis stylata stylata
- Rhizagrotis stylata arida
