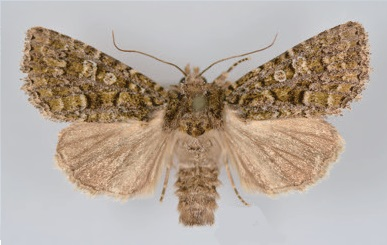
- Male

Scientific classification
- Kingdom: Animalia
- Phylum: Arthropoda
- Clade: Pancrustacea
- Class: Insecta
- Order: Lepidoptera
- Superfamily: Noctuoidea
- Family: Noctuidae
- Genus: Viridiseptis; Mustelin & Crabo, 2015
- Species: V. marina

Binomial name
- Viridiseptis marina (Grote, 1874)

Synonyms
- Hadena marina Grote, 1874; Aseptis marina

= Viridiseptis =

Viridiseptis marina

Genus of moths

Viridiseptis is a monotypic moth genus in the family Noctuidae erected by Tomas Mustelin and Lars G. Crabo in 2015. Its only species, Viridiseptis marina, was first described by Augustus Radcliffe Grote in 1874. It is found throughout coastal California and in south-western Oregon as far north as Douglas County. It is widely distributed in southern California. It is found in many habitats such as coastal chaparral, mountain forest, mountain-desert transition zone, and occasionally in the deserts from sea level to at least 2000 meters.

The wingspan is about 29.5–35 mm. The forewings are granular mossy green, occasionally yellowish green, with a mottled dark-gray to black and light-green pattern that obscures all but the darkest parts of the lines and spots. The darkest areas are a small patch at the base of the trailing edge of the wing, the cell and fold in the medial area, a bar on the costa preceding the subterminal line, and terminal area opposite the reniform spot. The relatively small reniform spot and round orbicular spot are filled with peripheral whitish and central green scales. The basal, antemedial and postmedial lines are double, black filled with green, and the subterminal line is green. All are sinuous and appear incomplete. The hindwings are light brown gray with a darker border. Adults are on wing from April to early July.

The larvae feed on Nemophila, Pholistoma auritium, Lilja and Lithophragma species.

== Etymology ==
The genus name is derived from viridis (meaning green) and septis by analogy to Aseptis.
