= Amolita roseola =

Scientific classification
- Domain: Eukaryota
- Kingdom: Animalia
- Phylum: Arthropoda
- Class: Insecta
- Order: Lepidoptera
- Superfamily: Noctuoidea
- Family: Erebidae
- Tribe: Omopterini
- Genus: Amolita
- Species: A. roseola

Binomial name
- Amolita roseola Smith, 1903

Species of moth

Amolita roseola is a moth species in the family Erebidae. It is found in North America.

The MONA or Hodges number for Amolita roseola is 9821.
