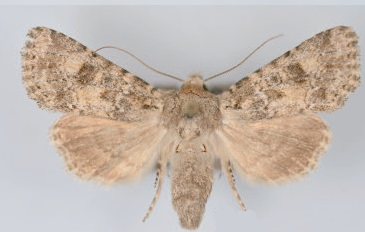
- Female
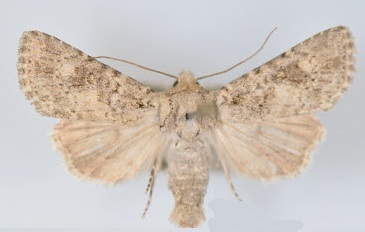
- Male

Scientific classification
- Domain: Eukaryota
- Kingdom: Animalia
- Phylum: Arthropoda
- Class: Insecta
- Order: Lepidoptera
- Superfamily: Noctuoidea
- Family: Noctuidae
- Genus: Aseptis
- Species: A. catalina

Binomial name
- Aseptis catalina (J. B. Smith, 1899)

Synonyms
- Hadena catalina J. B. Smith, 1899

= Aseptis catalina =

Species of moth

Aseptis catalina is a moth of the family Noctuidae first described by John Bernhardt Smith in 1899. It is found in the deserts of Arizona, California and Baja California in Mexico.

The wingspan is 30–33 mm. The forewings are powdery pale yellow tan with patchy contrasting darker gray markings including the filling of the reniform spot and the adjacent medial area. The postreniform patch is large but only slightly lighter in color than the fold portion of the medial area and the filling of the lines. The basal and postmedial areas are darker. The reniform spot is large and it and the claviform spot are filled with dark gray. The antemedial and postmedial lines are black, filled with pale cream and the postmedial line is often followed by black and white dots on the veins. The subterminal area is pale cream, the terminal line is a series of black spots and the fringe is checkered. There is some variation in the color and tone of the ground color, which can be very pale cream or more tan colored. Although the pattern is complete, the maculation is usually indistinct. The flight period depends on winter rainfall and is early, generally early March to April.
