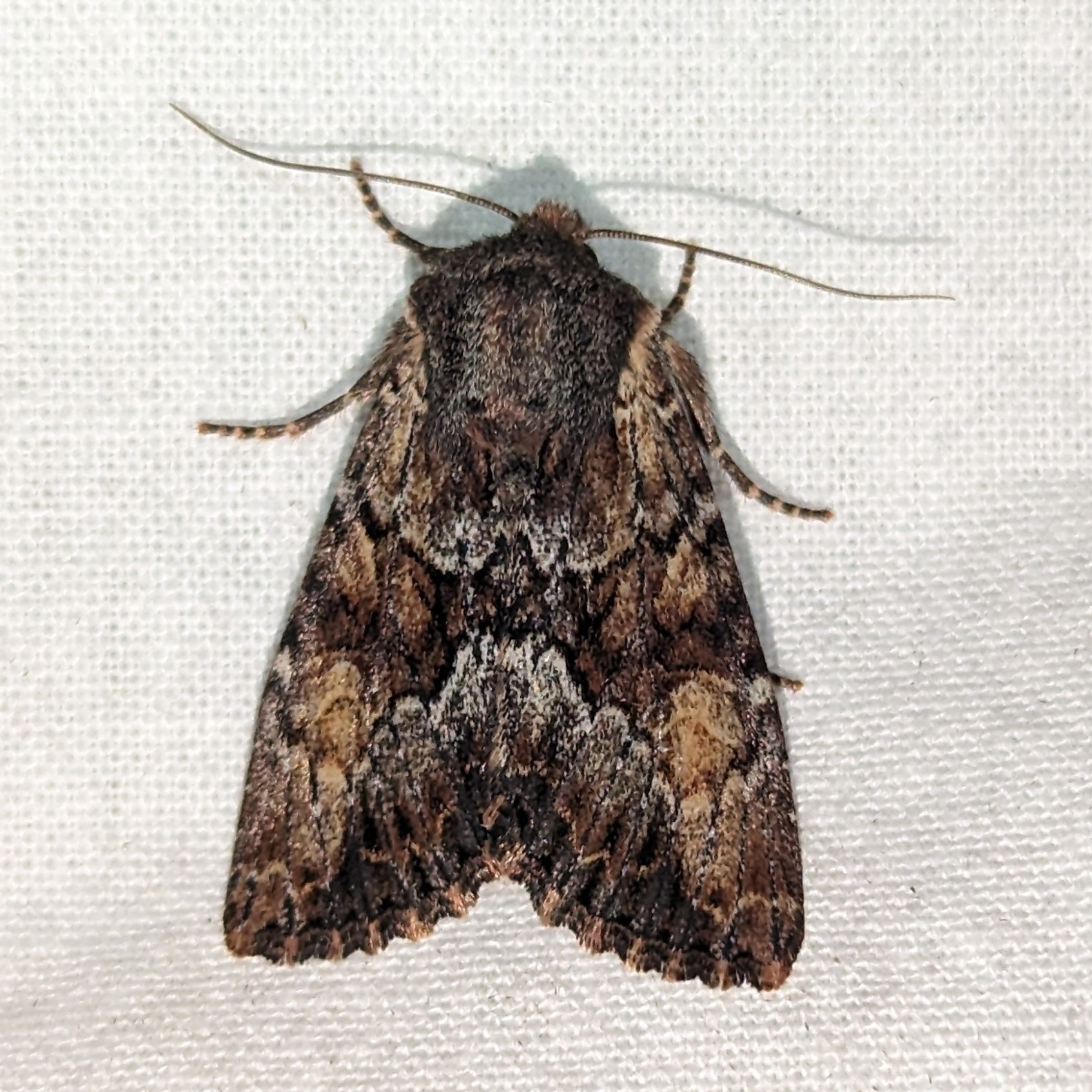

Scientific classification
- Domain: Eukaryota
- Kingdom: Animalia
- Phylum: Arthropoda
- Class: Insecta
- Order: Lepidoptera
- Superfamily: Noctuoidea
- Family: Noctuidae
- Genus: Apamea
- Species: A. sora

Binomial name
- Apamea sora Smith, 1903

Synonyms
- Apamea auranticolor sora

= Apamea sora =

Species of moth

Apamea sora is a species of moth in the family Noctuidae. It is found in western North America, where it is distributed across the Pacific Northwest to the Alaska Panhandle and east to the Rocky Mountains of Alberta.

This moth has a forewing length of 17 to 21 millimeters. It is variable, appearing in shades of orange, ochre, gray to gray-violet, and black. The male has bead-like antennae.

The moth inhabits the high-elevation spruce and fir forests and mid-elevation ponderosa pine forests of the mountain ranges of western North America.

The adult is nocturnal. The larva is unknown, but it is probably a cutworm.

This was formerly considered to be a subspecies of Apamea auranticolor.
