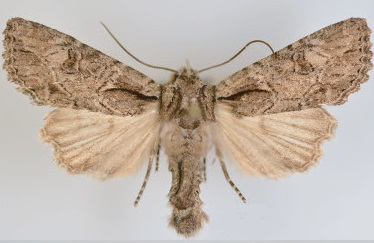
- Male
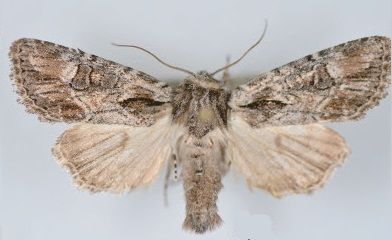
- Female

Scientific classification
- Kingdom: Animalia
- Phylum: Arthropoda
- Clade: Pancrustacea
- Class: Insecta
- Order: Lepidoptera
- Superfamily: Noctuoidea
- Family: Noctuidae
- Tribe: Xylenini
- Genus: Paraseptis; Mustelin & Crabo, 2015
- Species: P. adnixa

Binomial name
- Paraseptis adnixa (Grote, 1880)

Synonyms
- Hadena adnixa Grote, 1880; Aseptis adnixa; Hadena pausis Smith, 1899; Aseptis pausis

= Paraseptis =

Moth genus

Paraseptis is a monotypic moth genus in the family Noctuidae erected by Tomas Mustelin and Lars G. Crabo in 2015. Its only species, Paraseptis adnixa, was first described by Augustus Radcliffe Grote in 1880. It is widely distributed along the Pacific Coast from northern Mexico to south-western British Columbia in a variety of forested habitats.

The wingspan is about 32–37.5 mm. Adults are gray brown, and have a full complement of dark lines and spots and a pale postreniform patch. There is a streaky hindwing with dark veins. The basal dash is thicker black than that of Aseptis binotata and extends fully to the antemedial line. Black wedges on the wing distal to the lower cell and in the fold are also more prominent in P. adnixa. In the Pacific Northwest, P. adnixa is typically patchy brown, often with a reddish tint, with a large pale-ochre postreniform patch and contrasting black markings. Adults are on wing from April to July.

The larvae feed on Oemleria cerasiformis and Prunus species.

== Etymology ==
The genus name is derived from para (meaning next to) and septis by analogy to Aseptis.
