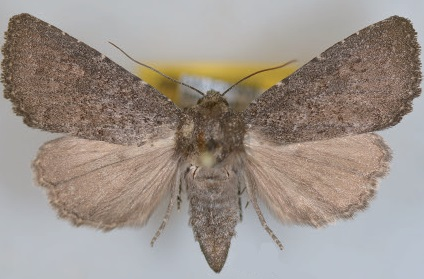
- Female
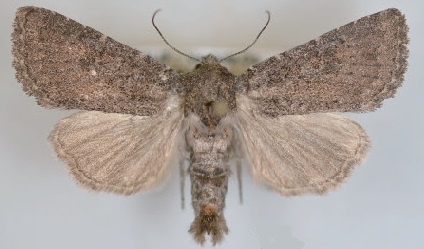
- Male

Scientific classification
- Domain: Eukaryota
- Kingdom: Animalia
- Phylum: Arthropoda
- Class: Insecta
- Order: Lepidoptera
- Superfamily: Noctuoidea
- Family: Noctuidae
- Genus: Aseptis
- Species: A. fanatica

Binomial name
- Aseptis fanatica Mustelin, 2006

= Aseptis fanatica =

Species of moth

Aseptis fanatica is a moth of the family Noctuidae first described by Tomas Mustelin in 2006. It is found in western North America in Washington, Oregon, California, and Baja California Norte in Mexico. It is found in habitats like brush land and open forest in southern California, mostly at 1000–2000 meters, but occurs at lower elevations farther north.

The wingspan is 35–42 mm. In southern California, Adults have dark chocolate-brown forewings, whereas in northern California, Oregon, and Washington it is darker brown to nearly black. Some individuals in central California are smooth bright red brown. The maculation is dark, either diffuse or weakly contrasting. The most prominent markings are the black-filled reniform spot, a black shade proximal to the incomplete pale subterminal line, and pale-yellowish spots on the costa at the antemedial and postmedial lines. Well-marked specimens have a serrate black postmedial line, some black on the veins, and scattered pale scales giving them a peppered look. The hindwing is slightly paler than the forewing, particularly in males. The hindwings are a shade paler than the forewings. The flight period is from early May to August in the south and in mid-summer in the Cascades.

The larvae feed on Arbutus menziesii and various Arctostaphylos species, including Arctostaphylos uva-ursi.

== Etymology ==
The species name was selected as the antithesis of Aseptis ethnica (meaning heathen) and is derived from Latin fanatica (meaning fanatic).
