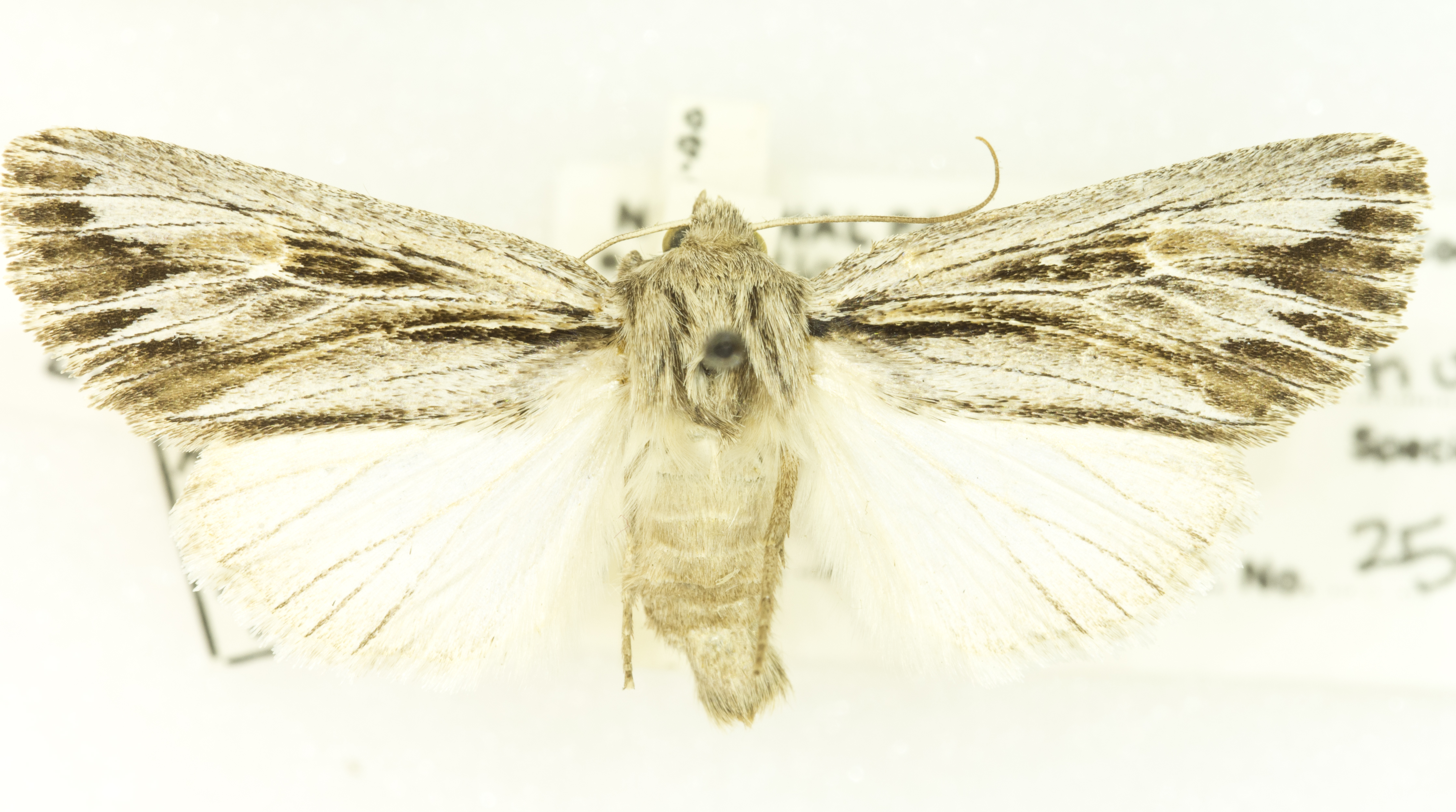
- Rhizagrotis cloanthoides

Scientific classification
- Domain: Eukaryota
- Kingdom: Animalia
- Phylum: Arthropoda
- Class: Insecta
- Order: Lepidoptera
- Superfamily: Noctuoidea
- Family: Noctuidae
- Subfamily: Noctuinae
- Genus: Rhizagrotis; J. B. Smith, 1890

Synonyms
- Cerapoda J. B. Smith, 1894; Prochloridea Barnes & McDunnough

= Rhizagrotis =

Genus of moths

Rhizagrotis is a genus of moths of the family Noctuidae. The genus was erected by John Bernhardt Smith in 1890.

== Species ==
- Rhizagrotis aegyptica (Joannis, 1910)
- Rhizagrotis albalis (Grote, 1878)
- Rhizagrotis cloanthoides (Grote, 1881)
- Rhizagrotis modesta (Barnes & McDunnough, 1911)
- Rhizagrotis stylata (J. B. Smith, 1893)
