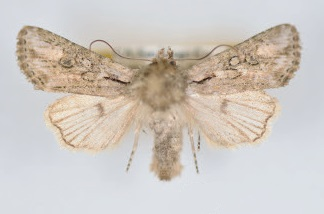
- Female

Scientific classification
- Domain: Eukaryota
- Kingdom: Animalia
- Phylum: Arthropoda
- Class: Insecta
- Order: Lepidoptera
- Superfamily: Noctuoidea
- Family: Noctuidae
- Genus: Aseptis
- Species: A. torreyana

Binomial name
- Aseptis torreyana Mustelin, 2006

= Aseptis torreyana =

Species of moth

Aseptis torreyana is a moth of the family Noctuidae first described by Tomas Mustelin in 2006. It is found in along the south side of the sea level salt marsh estuary of Torrey Pines State Natural Reserve in Southern California. The habitat is most likely salt marsh, although it could be coastal chaparral.

The wingspan is about 27.5 mm. The forewings are pale buff, overlaid with pale gray scales and marked with black basal dash and outlines of the three spots. The reniform spot is the largest and is filled with dark scales. The pale postmedial line is barely visible while the antemedial line is missing. The strong black basal dash gives the impression of a small pale Paraseptis adnixa. Adults are on wing in April.
