= Fishia connecta =

Scientific classification
- Domain: Eukaryota
- Kingdom: Animalia
- Phylum: Arthropoda
- Class: Insecta
- Order: Lepidoptera
- Superfamily: Noctuoidea
- Family: Noctuidae
- Tribe: Xylenini
- Subtribe: Antitypina
- Genus: Fishia
- Species: F. connecta

Binomial name
- Fishia connecta (Smith, 1894)

Species of moth

Fishia connecta is a species of cutworm or dart moth in the family Noctuidae. It is found in North America.

The MONA or Hodges number for Fishia connecta is 9971.
