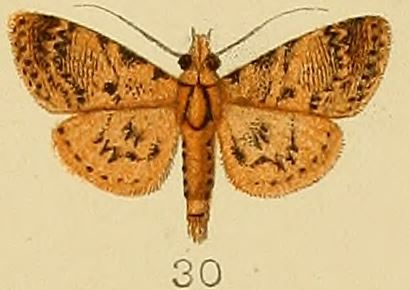

Scientific classification
- Domain: Eukaryota
- Kingdom: Animalia
- Phylum: Arthropoda
- Class: Insecta
- Order: Lepidoptera
- Family: Pyralidae
- Genus: Coenodomus
- Species: C. cornucalis

Binomial name
- Coenodomus cornucalis (Kenrick, 1907)

Synonyms
- Stericta cornucalis Kenrick, 1907

= Coenodomus cornucalis =

Species of moth

Coenodomus cornucalis is a species of snout moth in the genus Coenodomus. It is known from Papua New Guinea.

It has a wingspan of 22mm.
