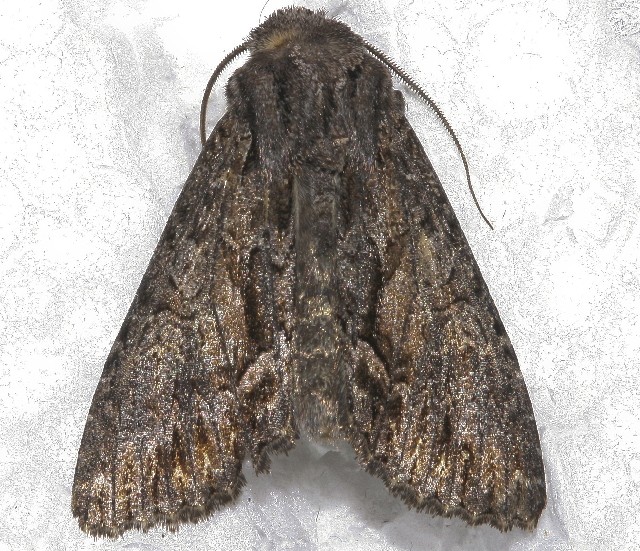

Scientific classification
- Kingdom: Animalia
- Phylum: Arthropoda
- Class: Insecta
- Order: Lepidoptera
- Superfamily: Noctuoidea
- Family: Noctuidae
- Genus: Fishia
- Species: F. discors

Binomial name
- Fishia discors (Grote, 1881)

Synonyms
- Fishia evelina (French, 1888); Fishia hanhami Smith, 1909

= Fishia discors =

Species of moth

Fishia discors, the garden cutworm, is a species of cutworm or dart moth in the family Noctuidae. It is found in North America.

The MONA or Hodges number for Fishia discors is 9970.
