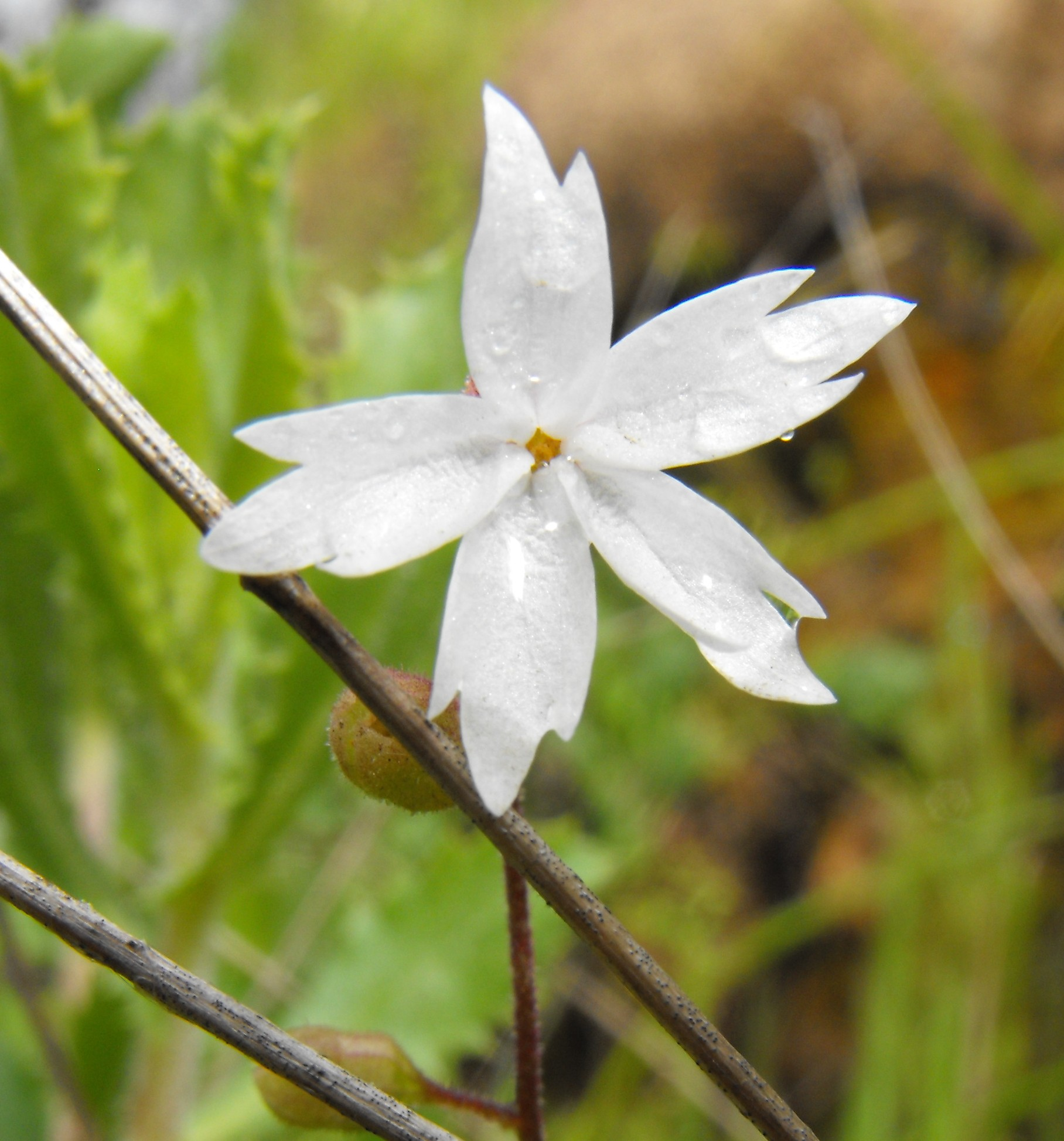

Scientific classification
- Kingdom: Plantae
- Clade: Tracheophytes
- Clade: Angiosperms
- Clade: Eudicots
- Order: Saxifragales
- Family: Saxifragaceae
- Genus: Lithophragma
- Species: L. affine

Binomial name
- Lithophragma affine A.Gray

= Lithophragma affine =

Species of flowering plant

Lithophragma affine is a species of flowering plant in the saxifrage family known by the common name San Francisco woodland star or fringed woodland star. It is native to the coast of western North America from Oregon to Baja California, where it grows in open habitat on mountain slopes, hills, and canyonsides up to an altitude of 6,600 feet (2,000 m).

It is a rhizomatous perennial herb growing erect or leaning with a tall naked flowering stem. The leaves are located on the lower part of the stem, each divided into sharp-pointed lobes. The stem bears up to 15 widely spaced flowers, each in a cuplike calyx of red or green sepals. The five petals are bright white, up to 1.3 centimeters long, and divided into three toothlike lobes at the tips.

Depending on location, it blooms between late January and June.
