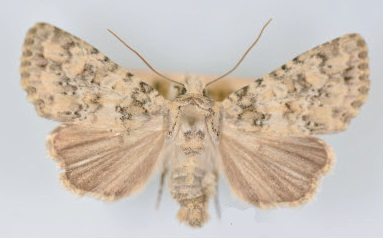
- Male
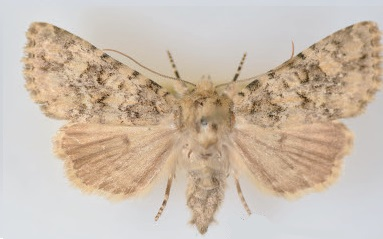
- Female

Scientific classification
- Domain: Eukaryota
- Kingdom: Animalia
- Phylum: Arthropoda
- Class: Insecta
- Order: Lepidoptera
- Superfamily: Noctuoidea
- Family: Noctuidae
- Genus: Aseptis
- Species: A. pseudolichena

Binomial name
- Aseptis pseudolichena Mustelin & Leuschner, 2000

= Aseptis pseudolichena =

Species of moth

Aseptis pseudolichena is a moth of the family Noctuidae first described by Tomas Mustelin and Ronald Henley Leuschner in 2000. It is endemic to southern California, with records from San Diego, Riverside, Los Angeles, Ventura, San Bernardino, and Tuolumne counties. The habitat consists of open pine and oak forest, open areas with grass and scrub, and foothill chaparral.

The wingspan is 30.5–36 mm. Adults are more yellowish than Aseptis lichena, as a result of a mixture of pale tan or yellowish scales and scattered tan, olive, and black scales. Some specimens are very pale yellow, others pale tan, and some olive tan. The antemedial and postmedial lines are serrate, and the postmedial line is followed by white and black dots on the veins. A pale subterminal line is usually visible. The orbicular spot is round and filled with ground color, whereas the reniform spot is large, outlined in black and filled with dark scales. A faint pale postreniform patch is present. Adults are on wing from June to August.

Larvae have been reared from Ribes malvaceum.
