= Amolita irrorata =

Scientific classification
- Kingdom: Animalia
- Phylum: Arthropoda
- Class: Insecta
- Order: Lepidoptera
- Superfamily: Noctuoidea
- Family: Erebidae
- Genus: Amolita
- Species: A. irrorata

Binomial name
- Amolita irrorata Hampson, 1910

Species of moth

Amolita irrorata is a species of moth in the family Erebidae first described by George Hampson in 1910. The species is found in South America, including Paraguay and Brazil. Its wingspan is 26–32 mm (1.0–1.3 in).

== Description ==
Head and thorax pale ochreous mixed with brown; palpi slightly tinged with rufous; pectus and legs suffused with brown; abdomen ochreous dorsally suffused with brown, ventrally irrorated (sprinkled) with brown. Forewing pale ochreous slightly tinged with reddish brown and thickly irrorated with black; a black point in middle of cell and another on discocellulars; a diffused oblique black-brown fascia from apex to inner margin before middle and another narrower fascia from termen below apex to inner margin beyond middle; a terminal series of black points; cilia with diffused blackish line through them. Hindwing ochreous white; a terminal series of black points from apex to vein 2; cilia with a faint brown line through them except towards tornus. Underside of forewing suffused with brown; hindwing with the costal area irrorated with brown, a black discoidal point.
