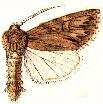

Scientific classification
- Kingdom: Animalia
- Phylum: Arthropoda
- Class: Insecta
- Order: Lepidoptera
- Superfamily: Noctuoidea
- Family: Noctuidae
- Genus: Andropolia
- Species: A. diversilineata

Binomial name
- Andropolia diversilineata (Grote, 1877)

Synonyms
- Hadena diversilineata Grote, 1877; Polia illepida Grote, 1879; Polia resoluta Smith, 1894; Andropolia submissa Smith, 1911

= Andropolia diversilineata =

Species of moth

Andropolia diversilineata is a moth in the family Noctuidae first described by Augustus Radcliffe Grote in 1877. It is found in western North America, from British Columbia south to California.

The wingspan is about 44 mm. Adults are on wing in late summer.

The larvae feed on Purshia tridentata.
