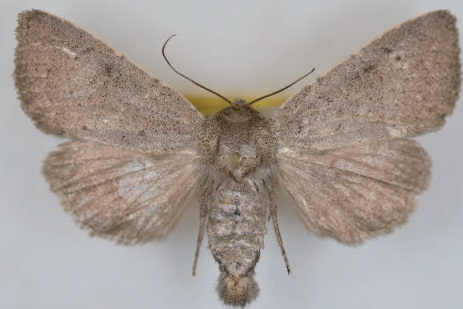
- Male
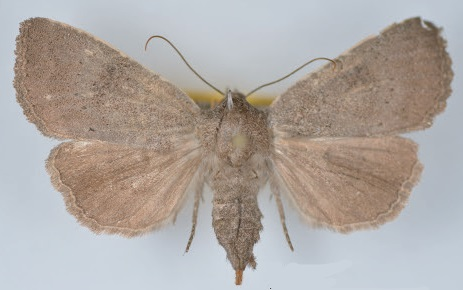
- Female

Scientific classification
- Domain: Eukaryota
- Kingdom: Animalia
- Phylum: Arthropoda
- Class: Insecta
- Order: Lepidoptera
- Superfamily: Noctuoidea
- Family: Noctuidae
- Genus: Aseptis
- Species: A. murina

Binomial name
- Aseptis murina Mustelin, 2000

= Aseptis murina =

Species of moth

Aseptis murina is a moth of the family Noctuidae first described by Tomas Mustelin in 2000. It is found in the US in southern California, where it occurs in coastal chaparral, foothills, mountain brush land and oak forest, and in the mountain-desert transition zone from sea level to 2000 meters.

The wingspan is 39–42 mm. The forewings are smooth gray with a slightly bluish sheen, a diffuse and faint dark reniform spot, as well as a postmedial line of black dots, and a pale-cream costa. The hindwings are a shade paler than the forewings. Adults are on wing from early May to July.

== Etymology ==
The specific name refers to the smooth mouse-like appearance of the moth and is derived from Latin murina (meaning mouse like).
