= Coenodomus hampsoni =

Scientific classification
- Domain: Eukaryota
- Kingdom: Animalia
- Phylum: Arthropoda
- Class: Insecta
- Order: Lepidoptera
- Family: Pyralidae
- Genus: Coenodomus
- Species: C. hampsoni

Binomial name
- Coenodomus hampsoni West, 1931

Species of moth

Coenodomus hampsoni is a species of snout moth in the genus Coenodomus. It was described by West in 1931, and is known from the Philippines.
