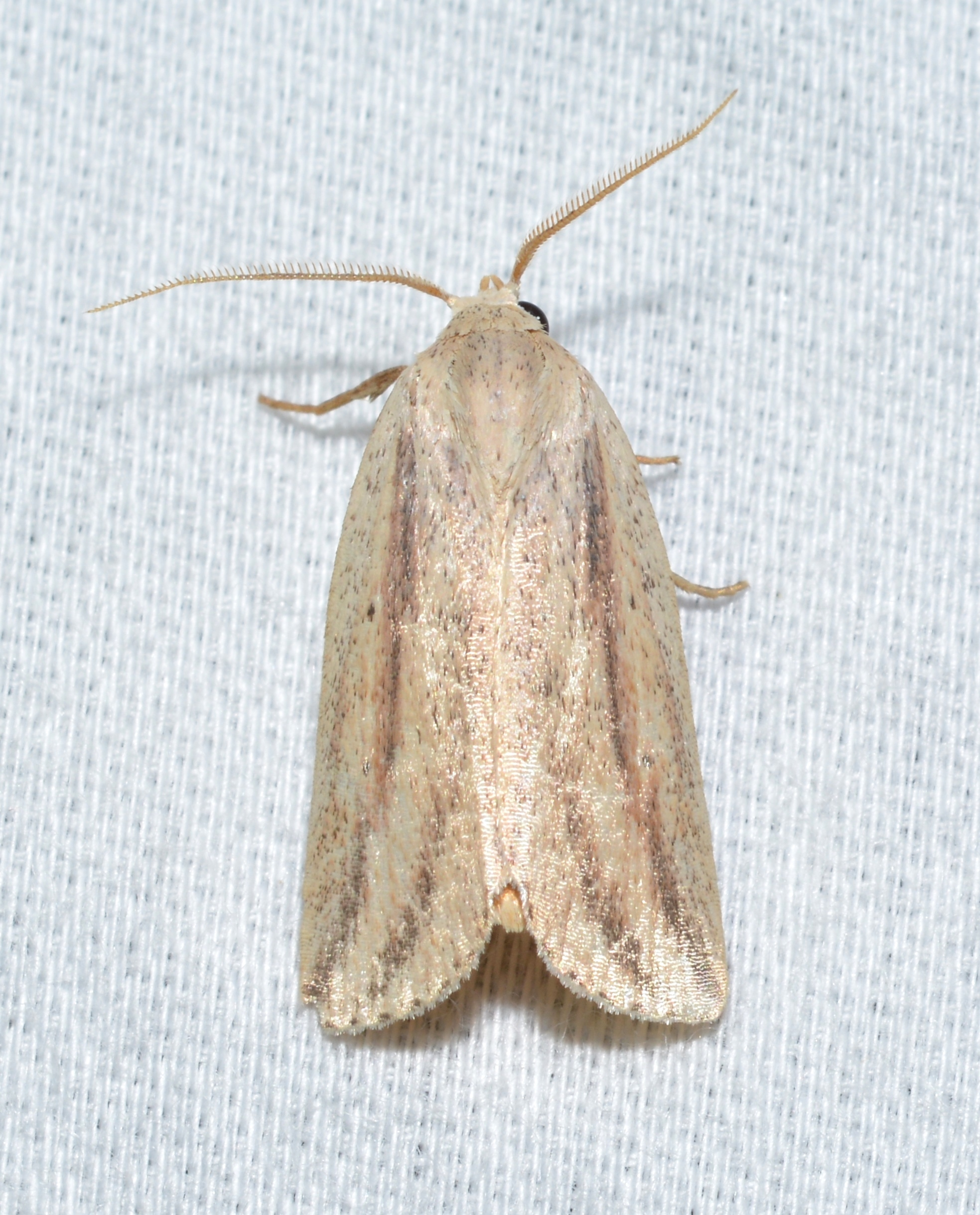

Scientific classification
- Kingdom: Animalia
- Phylum: Arthropoda
- Class: Insecta
- Order: Lepidoptera
- Superfamily: Noctuoidea
- Family: Erebidae
- Genus: Amolita
- Species: A. fessa

Binomial name
- Amolita fessa Grote, 1874

= Amolita fessa =

Species of moth

Amolita fessa, the feeble grass moth, is an owlet moth in the family Erebidae. The species was first described by Augustus Radcliffe Grote in 1874. It is found in North America.

The MONA or Hodges number for Amolita fessa is 9818.

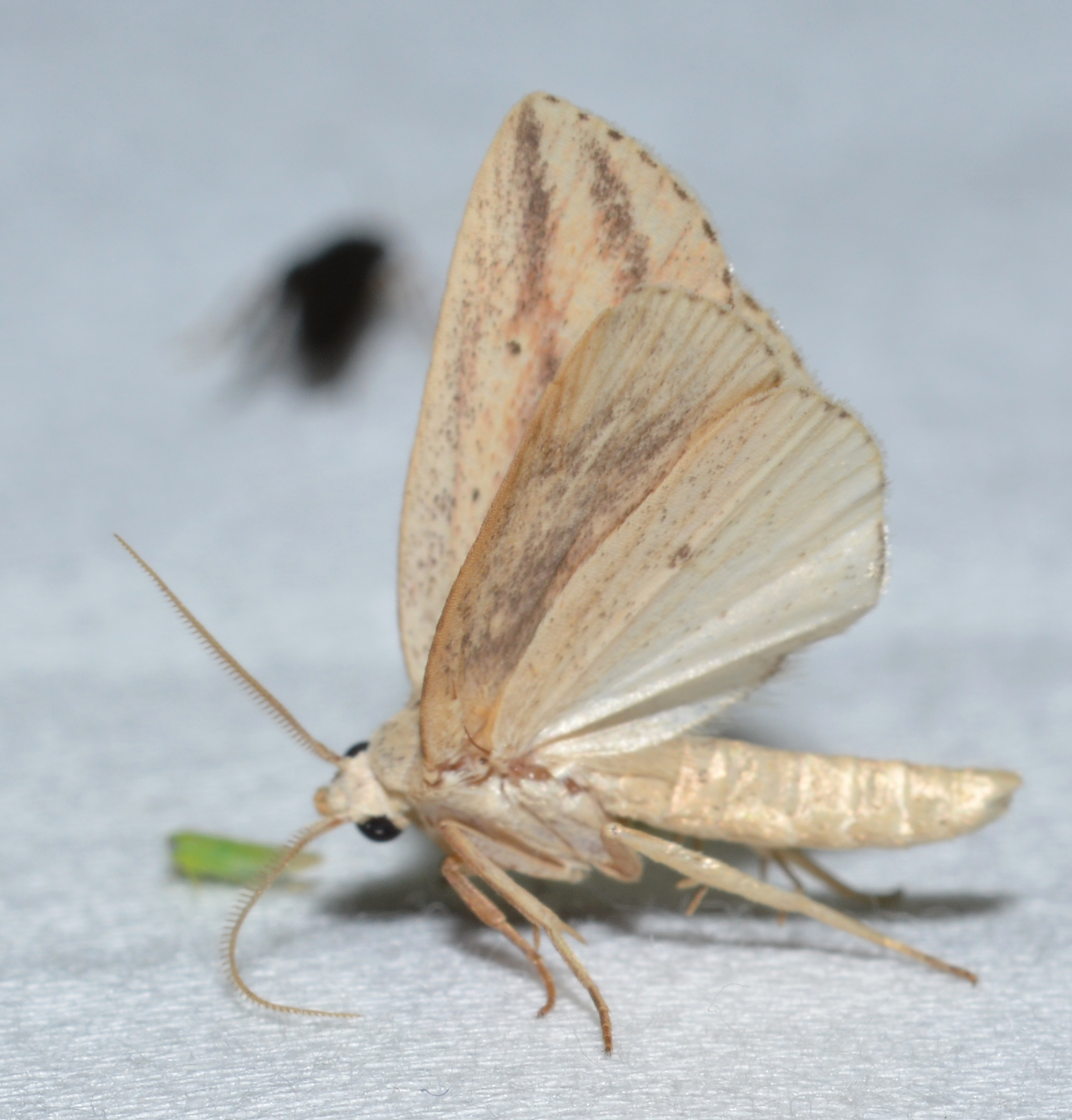
Feeble grass moth, Amolita fessa
