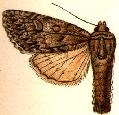

Scientific classification
- Kingdom: Animalia
- Phylum: Arthropoda
- Class: Insecta
- Order: Lepidoptera
- Superfamily: Noctuoidea
- Family: Noctuidae
- Genus: Andropolia
- Species: A. aedon

Binomial name
- Andropolia aedon Grote, 1880

Synonyms
- Polia aedon

= Andropolia aedon =

Species of moth

Andropolia aedon is a moth in the family Noctuidae first described by Augustus Radcliffe Grote in 1880. It is found in North America from British Columbia and Alberta south to California.

The wingspan is 42–46 mm (1.7–1.8 in). Adults are on wing from July to August.

The larvae feed on Alnus, Acer, Holodiscus discolor and Physocarpus capitatus.
