= Lithophragma bolanderi =

Scientific classification
- Kingdom: Plantae
- Clade: Tracheophytes
- Clade: Angiosperms
- Clade: Eudicots
- Order: Saxifragales
- Family: Saxifragaceae
- Genus: Lithophragma
- Species: L. bolanderi

Binomial name
- Lithophragma bolanderi A.Gray

Species of flowering plant

Lithophragma bolanderi is a species of flowering plant in the saxifrage family known by the common name Bolander's woodland star. It is endemic to California, where it is known from several mountain ranges, including the North Coast Ranges, the foothills of the Sierra Nevada, and the San Gabriel Mountains. It grows in many types of open habitat. It is a rhizomatous perennial herb growing erect or leaning with a tall naked flowering stem. The leaves are located on the lower part of the stem, each divided into rounded lobes. The stem bears up to 25 flowers, each in a cuplike calyx of red or green sepals. The five petals are white, under one centimeter long, and toothed or smooth along the edges.

== Taxonomy ==
Lithophragma bolanderi was described by Asa Gray in 1865.
