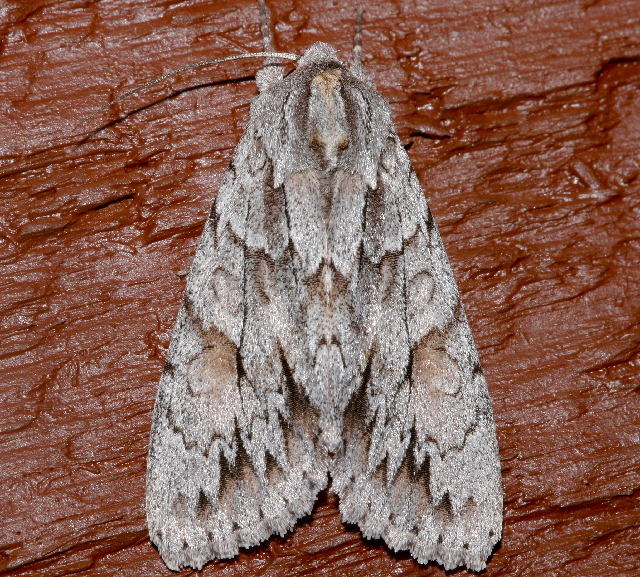

Scientific classification
- Kingdom: Animalia
- Phylum: Arthropoda
- Class: Insecta
- Order: Lepidoptera
- Superfamily: Noctuoidea
- Family: Noctuidae
- Genus: Andropolia
- Species: A. theodori

Binomial name
- Andropolia theodori Grote, 1878

Synonyms
- Apatela theodori

= Andropolia theodori =

Species of moth

Andropolia theodori is a moth in the family Noctuidae first described by Augustus Radcliffe Grote in 1878. It is found in the western parts of North America, from British Columbia, south to California.

The wingspan is 43–55 mm.

The larvae feed on Ceanothus velutinus and Holodiscus discolor.

== Subspecies ==
- Andropolia theodori theodori (Colorado)
- Andropolia theodori epichysis (California)
- Andropolia theodori vancouvera (British Columbia)
