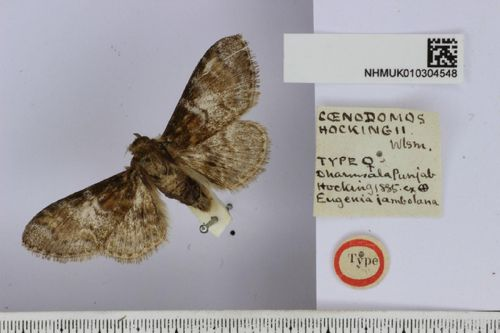

Scientific classification
- Kingdom: Animalia
- Phylum: Arthropoda
- Class: Insecta
- Order: Lepidoptera
- Family: Pyralidae
- Genus: Coenodomus
- Species: C. hockingii

Binomial name
- Coenodomus hockingii Walsingham, 1889

Synonyms
- Dyaria singularis Neumoegen, 1893; Alippa anomala Aurivillius, 1894

= Coenodomus hockingii =

Species of moth

Coenodomus hockingii is a species of snout moth in the genus Coenodomus. It was described by Walsingham in 1888, and is known from the United States, India and Indonesia.

The larvae are gregarious, and live in strong tubes of white silk, of the consistency of stout cardboard. These are open at both ends, and from three to fifteen are agglomerated together, the heads of the larvae projecting from one or other end, according to the position of the leaves of their food, to which the whole mass of tubes is attached by stout silken threads consisting of many strands. The walls of these tubes are double, and of very curious construction. The inner lining of white silk is smooth and rather shining, while the outer layer is much stouter and has an uneven surface. This is due to the interposition of larval excrement between the two walls. The silk at the ends of the tube is frayed out, and has apparently been used for attaching them to the leaves and twigs, or for changing the position of the common dwelling, according to the feeding requirements of its various inmates.

== Name ==
The species was originally named Dyaria singularis by Berthold Neumoegen, a New York banker and hobby-entomologist, at the request of his friend and fellow entomologist Harrison Gray Dyar Jr. Dyar wished for a genus to carry his name and apparently failed to notice the pun.
