= Lithophragma trifoliatum =

Scientific classification
- Kingdom: Plantae
- Clade: Tracheophytes
- Clade: Angiosperms
- Clade: Eudicots
- Order: Saxifragales
- Family: Saxifragaceae
- Genus: Lithophragma
- Species: L. trifoliatum

Binomial name
- Lithophragma trifoliatum Eastw.

Synonyms
- Lithophragma parviflorum var. trifoliatum (Eastw.) Jeps.

Variety of flowering plant

Lithophragma trifoliatum is a variety of flowering plant in the saxifrage family known from the western slope of the Cascade Range and Sierra Nevada in California. It is sometimes considered its own species based on the pink, fragrant flowers, the shape of the hypanthium, and other characters. Others consider it to be a sterile variety of L. parviflorum that likely now persists by vegetative reproduction.
