= Andropolia olga =

Scientific classification
- Domain: Eukaryota
- Kingdom: Animalia
- Phylum: Arthropoda
- Class: Insecta
- Order: Lepidoptera
- Superfamily: Noctuoidea
- Family: Noctuidae
- Tribe: Xylenini
- Subtribe: Antitypina
- Genus: Andropolia
- Species: A. olga

Binomial name
- Andropolia olga Smith, 1911

Species of moth

Andropolia olga is a species of cutworm or dart moth in the family Noctuidae. It is found in North America.

The MONA or Hodges number for Andropolia olga is 9572.
