= Amolita perstriata =

Scientific classification
- Kingdom: Animalia
- Phylum: Arthropoda
- Class: Insecta
- Order: Lepidoptera
- Superfamily: Noctuoidea
- Family: Erebidae
- Genus: Amolita
- Species: A. perstriata

Binomial name
- Amolita perstriata Hampson, 1910

Species of moth

Amolita perstriata is a species of moth in the family Erebidae first described by George Hampson in 1910. The species is found on the Bahamas. Its wingspan is about 22 mm.

== Description ==
Head, thorax, and abdomen ochreous white; palpi pale rufous; fore and mid-legs and hind tarsi tinged with brown. Forewing ochreous white sparsely irrorated (sprinkled) with black; a faint brownish fascia in the cell; two minute black points on the upper part of the middle of the cell and two at the upper angle; the interspaces of costal area tinged with brown towards apex; a faint diffused brown fascia from termen below apex to submedian fold where it terminates in a black point; a terminal series of black points. Hindwing white faintly tinged with ochreous. Underside of forewing and costal area of hindwing tinged with ochreous, the costa and termen of both wings slightly irrorated with brown; both wings with terminal series of black points.
