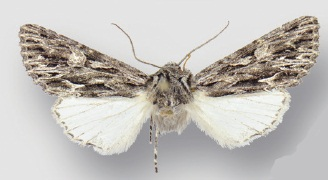

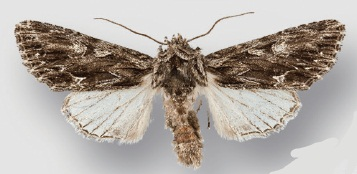

Scientific classification
- Kingdom: Animalia
- Phylum: Arthropoda
- Clade: Pancrustacea
- Class: Insecta
- Order: Lepidoptera
- Superfamily: Noctuoidea
- Family: Noctuidae
- Genus: Fishia
- Species: F. nigrescens

Binomial name
- Fishia nigrescens Hammond & Crabo, 2013

= Fishia nigrescens =

Species of moth

Fishia nigrescens is a moth in the family Noctuidae. It is found in central and eastern Oregon, Nevada, eastern California and Arizona. The habitat consists of sage steppe and open juniper forests.

The length of the forewings is 19–20 mm for males and 18 mm for females. The forewings of males and females are similar. The forewing ground color is slightly mottled charcoal gray. The hindwings are light gray in females, with an incomplete gray medial line and scattered gray scales in the basal row in both sexes. Adults are on wing in late fall, usually during October.

Larvae have been reared from Ericameria nauseosa. The larva was collected in May, pupated in June, and emerged in late September of the same year. It was described as green with a white lateral band.

== Etymology ==
The name is derived from the Latin niger (meaning black or dusky) and refers to the forewing color.
