= Aseptis =

- Aseptis binotata

Scientific classification
- Domain: Eukaryota
- Kingdom: Animalia
- Phylum: Arthropoda
- Class: Insecta
- Order: Lepidoptera
- Superfamily: Noctuoidea
- Family: Noctuidae
- Subfamily: Noctuinae
- Genus: Aseptis; McDunnough, 1937

Genus of moths

Aseptis is a genus of moths of the family Noctuidae. The genus was erected by James Halliday McDunnough in 1937.

== Species ==
- Aseptis fumeola species group
  - Aseptis ethnica (J. B. Smith, 1899)
  - Aseptis fanatica Mustelin, 2006
  - Aseptis ferruginea Mustelin, 2000
  - Aseptis fumeola (Hampson, 1908)
  - Aseptis murina Mustelin, 2000
- Aseptis lichena species group
  - Aseptis lichena (Barnes & McDunnough, 1912)
  - Aseptis pseudolichena Mustelin & Leuschner, 2000
- unplaced to species group
  - Aseptis binotata (Walker, 1865)
  - Aseptis catalina (J. B. Smith, 1899)
  - Aseptis characta (Grote, 1880)
  - Aseptis fumosa (Grote, 1879)
  - Aseptis perfumosa (Hampson, 1918)
  - Aseptis serrula (Barnes & McDunnough, 1918)
  - Aseptis susquesa (J. B. Smith, 1908)
  - Aseptis torreyana Mustelin, 2006

== Former species ==
- Aseptis adnixa (Grote, 1880)
- Aseptis bultata (J. B. Smith, 1906)
- Aseptis cara (Barnes & McDunnough, 1918)
- Aseptis dilara (Strecker, 1899)
- Aseptis genetrix (Grote, 1878)
- Aseptis marina (Grote, 1874)
- Aseptis monica (Barnes & McDunnough, 1918)
- Aseptis pausis (J. B. Smith, 1899)
- Aseptis paviae (Strecker, 1874)
