= Coenodomus trichasema =

Scientific classification
- Kingdom: Animalia
- Phylum: Arthropoda
- Class: Insecta
- Order: Lepidoptera
- Family: Pyralidae
- Genus: Coenodomus
- Species: C. trichasema

Binomial name
- Coenodomus trichasema (Hampson, 1916)

Synonyms
- Stericta trichasema Hampson, 1916

Species of moth

Coenodomus trichasema is a species of snout moth in the genus Coenodomus. It is known from Sri Lanka.
