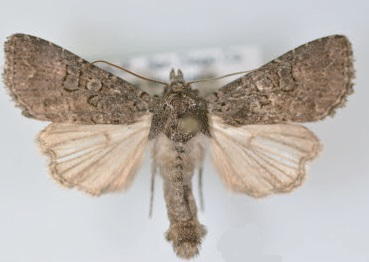
- Male
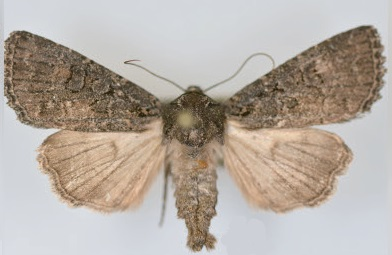
- Female

Scientific classification
- Kingdom: Animalia
- Phylum: Arthropoda
- Class: Insecta
- Order: Lepidoptera
- Superfamily: Noctuoidea
- Family: Noctuidae
- Genus: Aseptis
- Species: A. fumosa

Binomial name
- Aseptis fumosa (Grote, 1879)

Synonyms
- Hadena fumosa Grote, 1879

= Aseptis fumosa =

Species of moth

Aseptis fumosa is a moth of the family Noctuidae first described by Augustus Radcliffe Grote in 1879. It is widespread in western North America and is known from western Canada, Washington, Nebraska, Colorado, Utah, Arizona, Nevada and California. It occurs in a variety of diverse habitats including coast chaparral, dry conifer forest, and shrub steppe.

The wingspan is about 31.5–38 mm. The forewings are uniform smoky dark blackish brown with brown filling of the antemedial and postmedial lines that is most evident as dots on the costa. The weakly figure-eight shaped reniform spot, orbicular spot, and short claviform spot are black filled with ground color or slightly darker scales. The male hindwing is pearly gray distal to the spot that accentuates the vein asymmetry. The hindwing of the female is smoky dark with dark but less conspicuous veins. Adults are on wing from April or May to July.

The larvae feed on Purshia (including Purshia tridentata), Cercocarpus and Ceanothus (including Ceanothus integerrimus) species, as well as Adenostoma fasciculatum. The larva is smooth green with a white subdorsal stripe and broad red and white lateral stripe.
