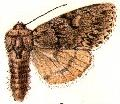

Scientific classification
- Kingdom: Animalia
- Phylum: Arthropoda
- Class: Insecta
- Order: Lepidoptera
- Superfamily: Noctuoidea
- Family: Noctuidae
- Genus: Andropolia
- Species: A. contacta

Binomial name
- Andropolia contacta Walker, 1856

Synonyms
- Acronycta contacta; Acronycta aspera; Polia diffusilis; Andropolia extincta (Smith, 1900); Andropolia sansar (Strecker, 1898)

= Andropolia contacta =

Canadian giant

Species of moth

Andropolia contacta, the Canadian giant, is a moth in the family Noctuidae. The species was first described by Francis Walker in 1856.

The larvae feed on Alnus, Betula, Salix and Populus tremuloides.

== Subspecies ==
- Andropolia contacta contacta
- Andropolia contacta pulverulenta (Colorado, ...)
