= Lithophragma campanulatum =

Scientific classification
- Kingdom: Plantae
- Clade: Tracheophytes
- Clade: Angiosperms
- Clade: Eudicots
- Order: Saxifragales
- Family: Saxifragaceae
- Genus: Lithophragma
- Species: L. campanulatum

Binomial name
- Lithophragma campanulatum Howell

Species of flowering plant

Lithophragma campanulatum is a species of flowering plant in the saxifrage family known by the common name Siskiyou Mountain woodland star. It is native to southern Oregon and northern California, where it grows in the forests and woods of the mountains. It is a rhizomatous perennial herb growing erect or leaning with a tall naked flowering stem. The leaves are mostly located on the lower part of the stem, each divided into rounded lobes, sometimes narrowed into teeth. The stem bears 2 to 11 flowers, each in a cuplike calyx of red or green sepals. The five petals are white, under one centimeter long, and divided into irregular toothlike lobes.
