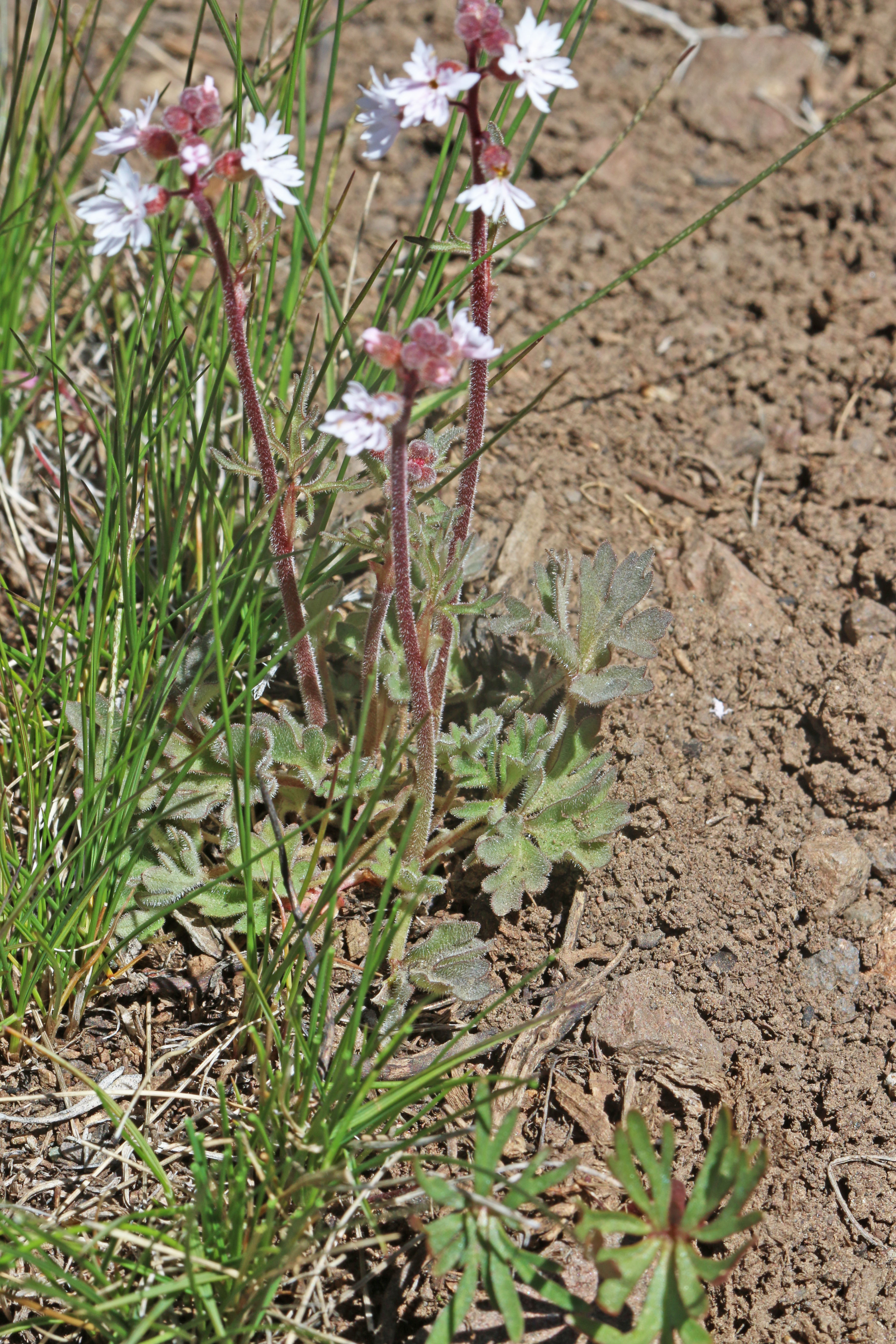

Scientific classification
- Kingdom: Plantae
- Clade: Tracheophytes
- Clade: Angiosperms
- Clade: Eudicots
- Order: Saxifragales
- Family: Saxifragaceae
- Genus: Lithophragma
- Species: L. tenellum

Binomial name
- Lithophragma tenellum Nutt.

= Lithophragma tenellum =

Species of flowering plant

Lithophragma tenellum is a species of flowering plant in the saxifrage family known by the common name slender woodland star.

It is native to much of western North America from British Columbia to California to New Mexico, where it grows in several types of open habitat. It is a rhizomatous perennial herb growing erect or leaning with a naked flowering stem. The leaves are mainly located low on the stem, each divided into three toothed lobes. The stem bears 3 to 12 flowers, each in a cuplike calyx of red or green sepals. The five petals are white or pink, up to 7 millimeters long, and lined with several lobes or teeth.
