= Coenodomus aglossalis =

Scientific classification
- Domain: Eukaryota
- Kingdom: Animalia
- Phylum: Arthropoda
- Class: Insecta
- Order: Lepidoptera
- Family: Pyralidae
- Genus: Coenodomus
- Species: C. aglossalis

Binomial name
- Coenodomus aglossalis (Warren, 1896)

Synonyms
- Scopocera aglossalis Warren, 1896

Species of moth

Coenodomus aglossalis is a species of snout moth in the genus Coenodomus. It is known from India.
