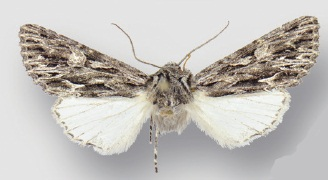
- Fishia nigrescens

Scientific classification
- Kingdom: Animalia
- Phylum: Arthropoda
- Class: Insecta
- Order: Lepidoptera
- Superfamily: Noctuoidea
- Family: Noctuidae
- Subtribe: Antitypina
- Genus: Fishia; Grote, 1877

= Fishia =

Genus of moths

Fishia is a genus of moths of the family Noctuidae.

== Species ==
- Fishia connecta (Smith, 1894)
- Fishia discors (Grote, 1881) (syn: Fishia evelina (French, 1888), Fishia hanhami Smith, 1909)
- Fishia dispar (Smith, 1900)
- Fishia illocata (Walker, 1857)
- Fishia nigrescens Hammond & Crabo, 2013
- Fishia yosemitae (Grote, 1873)
