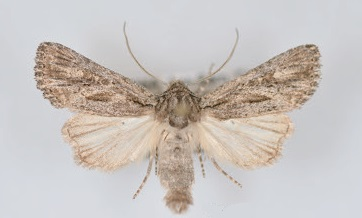
- Female
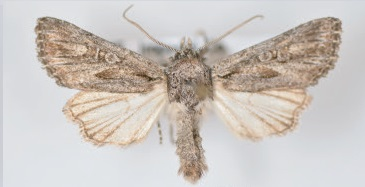
- Male

Scientific classification
- Domain: Eukaryota
- Kingdom: Animalia
- Phylum: Arthropoda
- Class: Insecta
- Order: Lepidoptera
- Superfamily: Noctuoidea
- Family: Noctuidae
- Genus: Aseptis
- Species: A. serrula

Binomial name
- Aseptis serrula (Barnes & McDunnough, 1918)

Synonyms
- Trachea serrula Barnes & McDunnough, 1918

= Aseptis serrula =

Species of moth

Aseptis serrula is a moth of the family Noctuidae first described by William Barnes and James Halliday McDunnough in 1918. It is found in the lower mountain-desert transition zone and in high desert such as the Mojave, Colorado, and Sonora deserts of south-eastern California, Nevada, Arizona and Baja California.

The wingspan is 29–34 mm. The forewings are relatively narrow, powdery gray, with the pointed black claviform spot as the most prominent mark. The dark reniform and orbicular spots are less prominent, the basal, antemedial, and postmedial lines are faint or absent, and the subterminal line is often evident as a pale W-mark. The postreniform patch is relatively small, and the medial area is often lighter than the ground color near the claviform spot. The hindwing is off white with dark veins and terminal area in males and darker gray with light base and dark veins in females. Adults are on wing in the desert spring, between March and early May depending on winter rainfall.
