= Coenodomus melanochlora =

Scientific classification
- Kingdom: Animalia
- Phylum: Arthropoda
- Class: Insecta
- Order: Lepidoptera
- Family: Pyralidae
- Genus: Coenodomus
- Species: C. melanochlora

Binomial name
- Coenodomus melanochlora (Hampson, 1916)

Synonyms
- Stericta melanochlora Hampson, 1916

Species of moth

Coenodomus melanochlora is a species of snout moth in the genus Coenodomus. It is known from Singapore.
