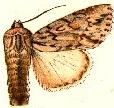

Scientific classification
- Kingdom: Animalia
- Phylum: Arthropoda
- Class: Insecta
- Order: Lepidoptera
- Superfamily: Noctuoidea
- Family: Noctuidae
- Genus: Andropolia
- Species: A. olorina

Binomial name
- Andropolia olorina (Grote, 1876)

Synonyms
- Hadena olorina Grote, 1876

= Andropolia olorina =

Species of moth

Andropolia olorina is a moth in the family Noctuidae first described by Augustus Radcliffe Grote in 1876. It is found in California and Nevada.

The wingspan is about 50 mm.

== Subspecies ==
- Andropolia olorina olorina
- Andropolia olorina australiae
