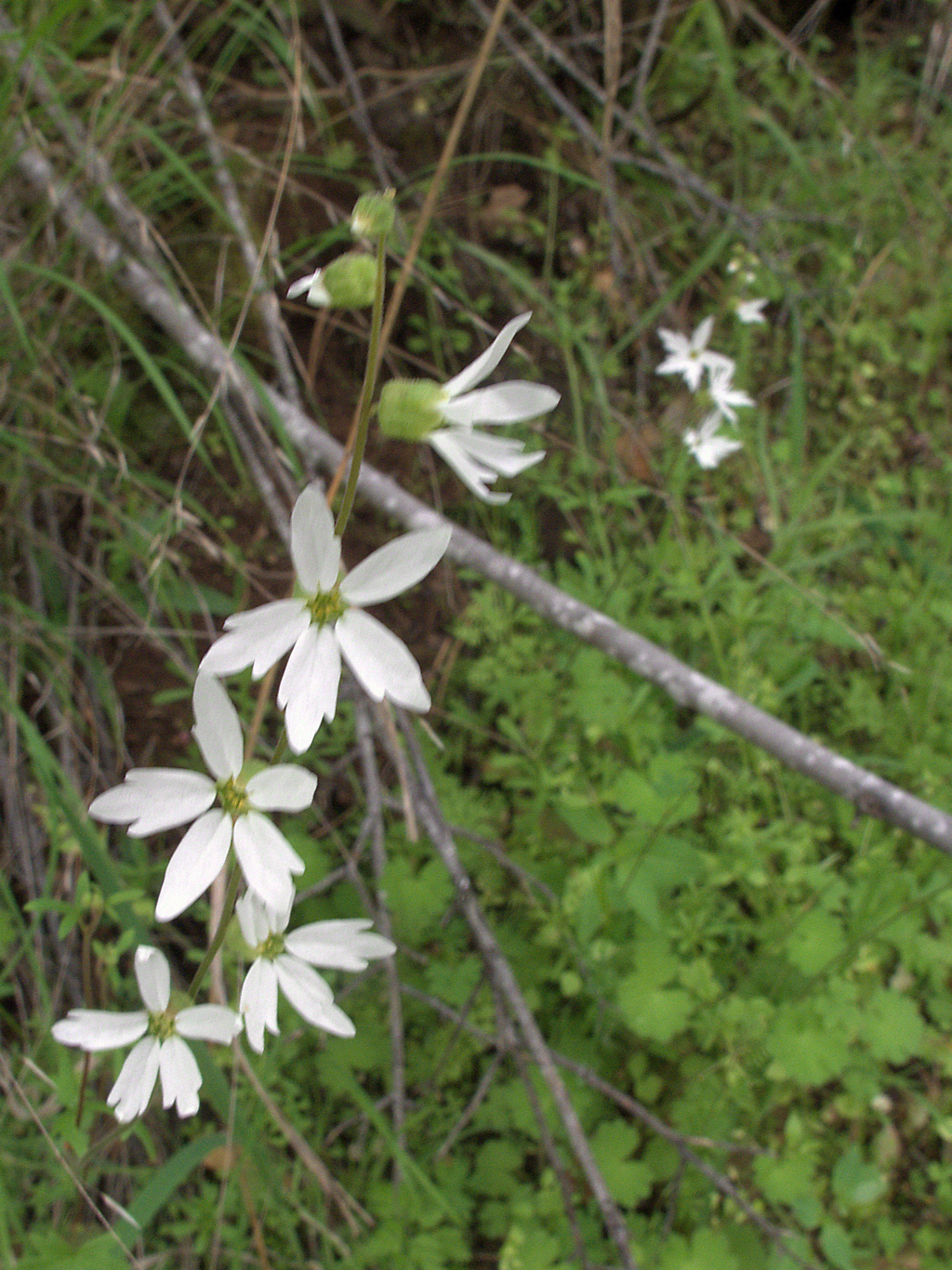

Scientific classification
- Kingdom: Plantae
- Clade: Tracheophytes
- Clade: Angiosperms
- Clade: Eudicots
- Order: Saxifragales
- Family: Saxifragaceae
- Genus: Lithophragma
- Species: L. heterophyllum

Binomial name
- Lithophragma heterophyllum (Hook. & Arn.) Torr. & A.Gray

= Lithophragma heterophyllum =

Species of flowering plant

Lithophragma heterophyllum, commonly known as hillside woodland star, is a species of flowering plant in the saxifrage family found in the western United States. It is native to the coastal mountain ranges of California, where it can generally be found in shady habitat. It is a rhizomatous perennial herb growing erect or leaning with a slender naked flowering stem. The leaves are located on the lower part of the stem, each divided into rounded lobes. The stem bears 3 to 12 flowers, each in a cuplike calyx of red or green sepals. The five petals are white, up to 1.2 centimeters long, and usually divided into about three pointed lobes.
