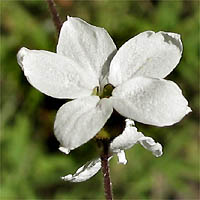

Scientific classification
- Kingdom: Plantae
- Clade: Tracheophytes
- Clade: Angiosperms
- Clade: Eudicots
- Order: Saxifragales
- Family: Saxifragaceae
- Genus: Lithophragma
- Species: L. cymbalaria

Binomial name
- Lithophragma cymbalaria Torr. & A.Gray

= Lithophragma cymbalaria =

Species of flowering plant

Lithophragma cymbalaria is a species of flowering plant in the saxifrage family known by the common name mission woodland star.

It is endemic to California, where it is known from moist, shady habitat in the California Coast Ranges and canyons from the San Francisco Bay Area to the Transverse Ranges in the Los Angeles region, and the northern Channel Islands of California.

== Description ==
Lithophragma cymbalaria is a rhizomatous perennial herb growing erect or leaning with a slender naked flowering stem. The small leaves are mostly located on the lower part of the stem, each divided into three rounded lobes.

The stem bears 2 to 8 flowers, each in a cuplike calyx of red or green sepals. The five petals are white, under one centimeter long, and smooth along the edges or very shallowly toothed.

== Taxonomy ==
Lithophragma cymbalaria was first described by John Torrey and Asa Gray in 1840.
