= Coenodomus fumosalis =

Scientific classification
- Kingdom: Animalia
- Phylum: Arthropoda
- Class: Insecta
- Order: Lepidoptera
- Family: Pyralidae
- Genus: Coenodomus
- Species: C. fumosalis

Binomial name
- Coenodomus fumosalis Hampson, 1903

Species of moth

Coenodomus fumosalis is a species of snout moth in the genus Coenodomus. It was described by George Hampson in 1903 and is known from India.
