= Coenodomus rubrescens =

Scientific classification
- Kingdom: Animalia
- Phylum: Arthropoda
- Class: Insecta
- Order: Lepidoptera
- Family: Pyralidae
- Genus: Coenodomus
- Species: C. rubrescens

Binomial name
- Coenodomus rubrescens (Hampson, 1903)

Synonyms
- Stericta rubrescens Hampson, 1903

Species of moth

Coenodomus rubrescens is a species of snout moth in the genus Coenodomus. It is known from India.
