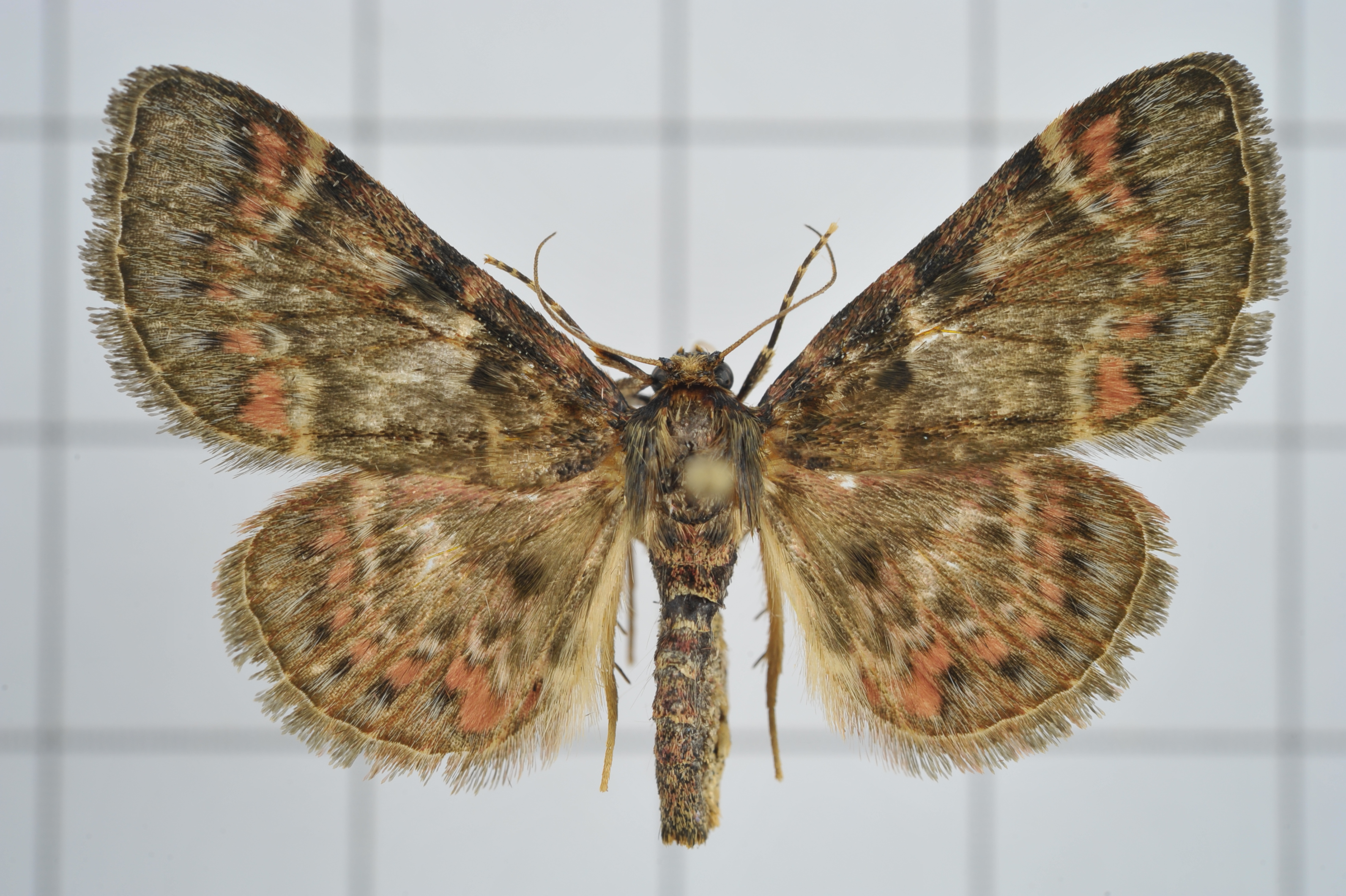

Scientific classification
- Kingdom: Animalia
- Phylum: Arthropoda
- Class: Insecta
- Order: Lepidoptera
- Family: Pyralidae
- Genus: Coenodomus
- Species: C. dudgeoni

Binomial name
- Coenodomus dudgeoni Hampson, 1896

= Coenodomus dudgeoni =

Species of moth

Coenodomus dudgeoni is a species of snout moth in the genus Coenodomus. It is known from Bhutan.
