= Amolita fratercula =

Scientific classification
- Domain: Eukaryota
- Kingdom: Animalia
- Phylum: Arthropoda
- Class: Insecta
- Order: Lepidoptera
- Superfamily: Noctuoidea
- Family: Erebidae
- Genus: Amolita
- Species: A. fratercula

Binomial name
- Amolita fratercula Barnes & McDunnough, 1912

Species of moth

Amolita fratercula is a species of moth in the family Erebidae first described by William Barnes and James Halliday McDunnough in 1912. It is found in North America.

The MONA or Hodges number for Amolita fratercula is 9822.
