= Coenodomus rotundinidus =

Scientific classification
- Kingdom: Animalia
- Phylum: Arthropoda
- Class: Insecta
- Order: Lepidoptera
- Family: Pyralidae
- Genus: Coenodomus
- Species: C. rotundinidus

Binomial name
- Coenodomus rotundinidus Hampson, 1891

Species of moth

Coenodomus rotundinidus is a species of snout moth in the genus Coenodomus. It is known from India.
