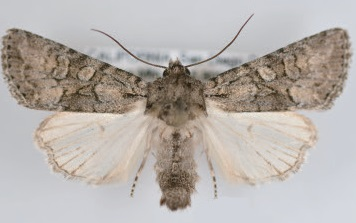
- Male

Scientific classification
- Domain: Eukaryota
- Kingdom: Animalia
- Phylum: Arthropoda
- Class: Insecta
- Order: Lepidoptera
- Superfamily: Noctuoidea
- Family: Noctuidae
- Genus: Aseptis
- Species: A. characta

Binomial name
- Aseptis characta (Grote, 1880)

Synonyms
- Hadena characta Grote, 1880; Hadena luteocinerea Smith, 1900; Hadena erica Smith, 1905; Hadena pluraloides McDunnough, 1922

= Aseptis characta =

Species of moth

Aseptis characta is a moth of the family Noctuidae first described by Augustus Radcliffe Grote in 1880. It is widespread in western North America, where it is found in the western Great Plains, Great Basin, and Pacific regions from British Columbia, Alberta, and Saskatchewan to Colorado, Utah, northern Arizona and southern California. The species occurs in dry habitats like sagebrush steppe, juniper woodlands, and open forest from sea level to 2,500 meters.

The wingspan is about 29.5–35 mm. The forewings are ash gray to pale tan, often darker gray in the medial area and with variable olive-gray, tan, or orange-tan patches. The basal, antemedial and postmedial lines are double, dark gray filled with pale gray. The postmedial area is lighter with a shade preceding the pale subterminal line and a number of black wedges between the veins. The three spots are outlined in black and are filled with the ground color and, except for the claviform spot, peripheral lighter gray scales. The hindwing is gray, pale gray, or white with dark discal spot, veins, and terminal line, darker in females. Emergence is earliest in xeric habitats, usually April in California and mid-May in the Pacific Northwest. The flight lasts until July to August depending on locality.

The larvae feed on Artemisia species.
