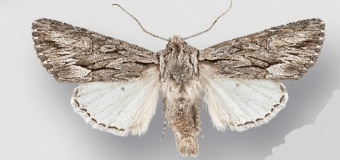
- Male

Scientific classification
- Kingdom: Animalia
- Phylum: Arthropoda
- Clade: Pancrustacea
- Class: Insecta
- Order: Lepidoptera
- Superfamily: Noctuoidea
- Family: Noctuidae
- Genus: Fishia
- Species: F. yosemitae

Binomial name
- Fishia yosemitae (Grote, 1873)

Synonyms
- Cucullia yosemitae Grote 1873; Fishia exhilarata Smith 1903; Fishia enthea Grote, 1877; Hadena tortilis Grote, 1880; Fishia tortilis; Fishia betsia Smith, 1905; Fishia instruta Smith, 1910

= Fishia yosemitae =

Species of moth

Fishia yosemitae, the dark grey fishia or grey fishia, is a moth in the family Noctuidae. It is found from central Alberta to Colorado in the Rocky Mountain and Great Plains regions. It is also found in eastern, central, and southern California, as well as in the Intermountain region.

The larvae feed on various herbaceous plants, including plants in the families Asteraceae and Scrophulariaceae, as well as Eriogonum species.
