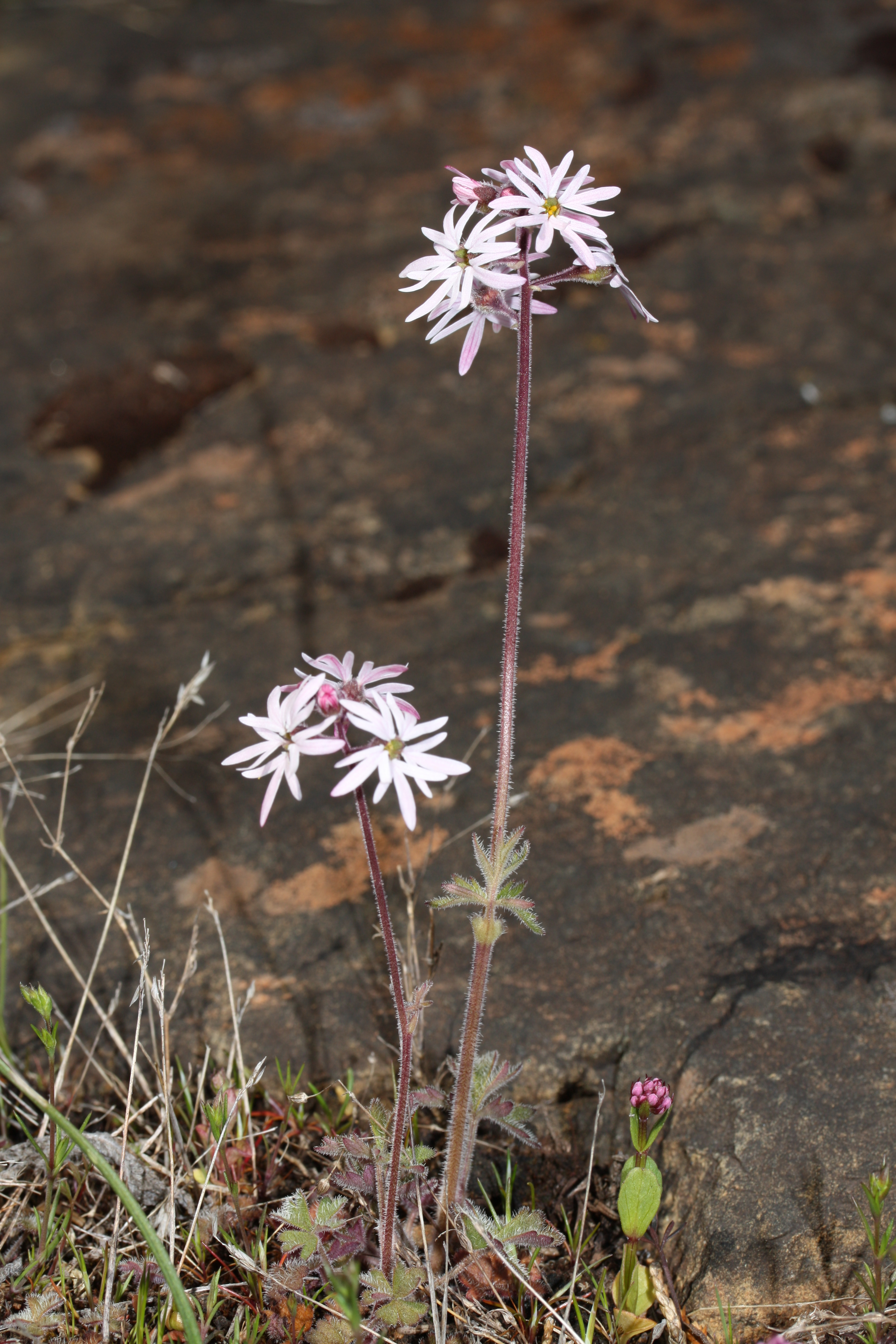

Scientific classification
- Kingdom: Plantae
- Clade: Tracheophytes
- Clade: Angiosperms
- Clade: Eudicots
- Order: Saxifragales
- Family: Saxifragaceae
- Genus: Lithophragma
- Species: L. parviflorum

Binomial name
- Lithophragma parviflorum (Hook.) Nutt. ex Torr. & A.Gray

= Lithophragma parviflorum =

Species of flowering plant

Lithophragma parviflorum is a species of flowering plant in the saxifrage family known by the common name smallflower woodland star. It is native to much of western North America from British Columbia to California to South Dakota and Nebraska, where it grows in several types of open habitat. It is a rhizomatous perennial herb growing erect or leaning with a naked flowering stem. The leaves are mainly located low on the stem, each cut into three lobes or divided into three lobed leaflets. The stem bears up to 14 flowers, each in a cuplike calyx of red or green sepals. The five petals are bright white, up to 1.6 centimeters long, and usually divided into three toothlike lobes.

Its bulblets may produce toxins capable of poisoning livestock, although rodents eat them with no known adverse effects.

== Varieties ==
The Flora of North America North of Mexico considers L. parviflorum var. trifoliatum to be a separate species endemic to California. But the Jepson Manual considers it to be a variety of L. parviflorum.

- L. parviflorum var. parviflorum - occurs in the western US and Canada
- L. parviflorum var. trifoliatum - a restricted variety endemic to California. Differs by having pink, fragrant flowers.
