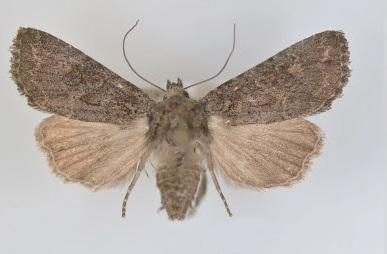
- Female
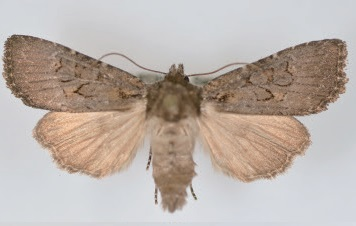
- Male

Scientific classification
- Kingdom: Animalia
- Phylum: Arthropoda
- Class: Insecta
- Order: Lepidoptera
- Superfamily: Noctuoidea
- Family: Noctuidae
- Genus: Aseptis
- Species: A. perfumosa

Binomial name
- Aseptis perfumosa (Hampson, 1918)

Synonyms
- Trachea perfumosa Hampson, 1918

= Aseptis perfumosa =

Species of moth

Aseptis perfumosa is a moth of the family Noctuidae first described by George Hampson in 1918. It is endemic to southern California, where it occurs in many habitats such as coastal chaparral and canyons, urban areas, brush land, and open oak forest from sea level to 2000 meters.

The wingspan is 30.5–34.5 mm. The forewings are slightly mottled dark gray brown, almost black in some specimens, often with a few grayish, brownish, olive, or reddish scales in the medial area around the velvety black spots of which the acute claviform spot is usually the most prominent. Less conspicuous forewing markings include a short black basal dash, incomplete faint wavy basal, antemedial and postmedial lines filled with brown, and irregular complete brown subterminal line. The hindwing of both sexes is dark grayish brown with inconspicuous veins. Adults are on wing from early April to early June in coastal areas and a little later at higher elevations.

The larvae feed on Arctostaphylos species.
