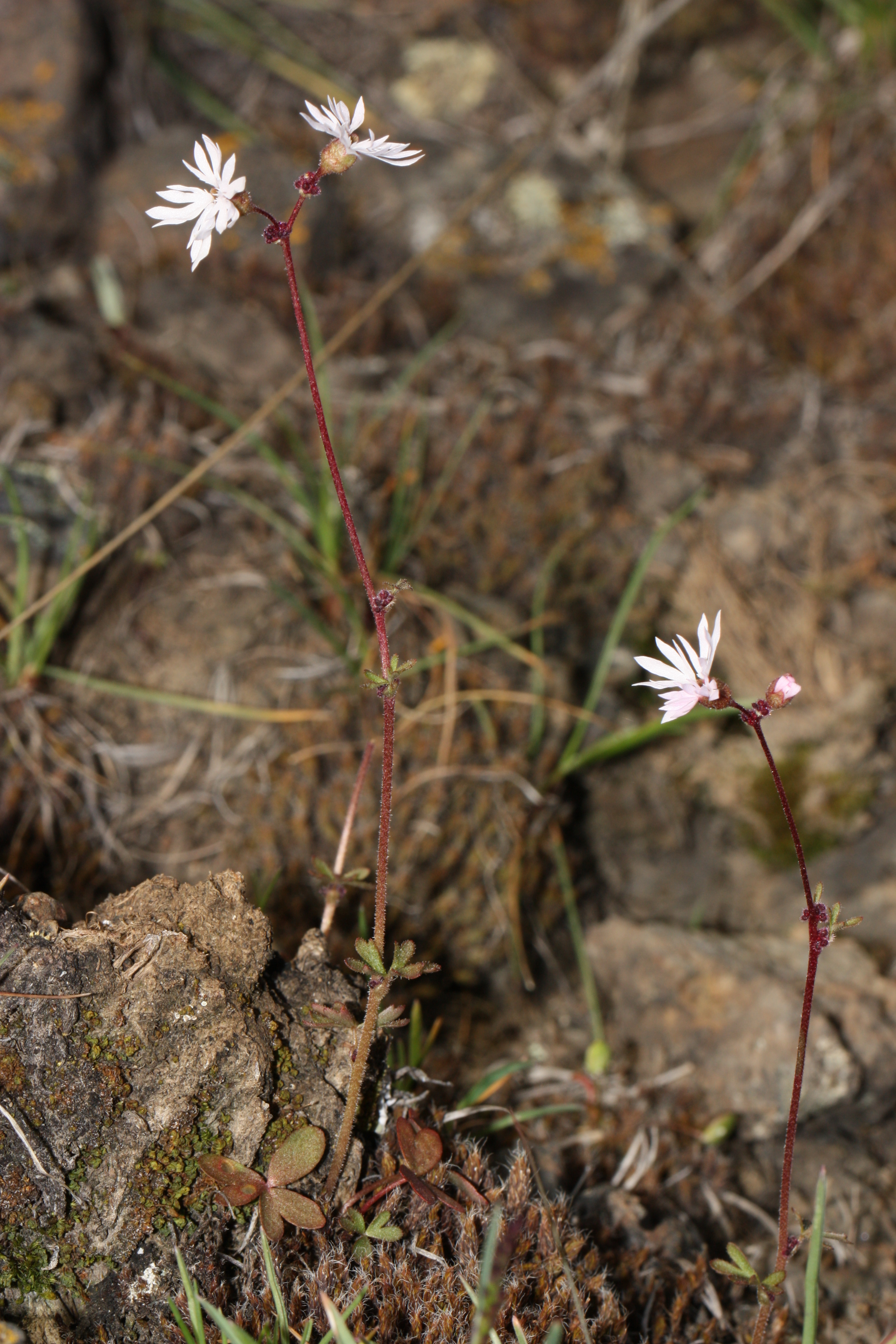

Scientific classification
- Kingdom: Plantae
- Clade: Tracheophytes
- Clade: Angiosperms
- Clade: Eudicots
- Order: Saxifragales
- Family: Saxifragaceae
- Genus: Lithophragma
- Species: L. glabrum

Binomial name
- Lithophragma glabrum Nutt.

Synonyms
- Lithophragma bulbiferum

= Lithophragma glabrum =

Species of flowering plant

Lithophragma glabrum is a slender perennial western North American mountain plant in the Saxifrage family (Saxifragaceae), known by the common names bulbous woodland star, bulbiferous prairie-star, smooth woodland star, and smooth rockstar.

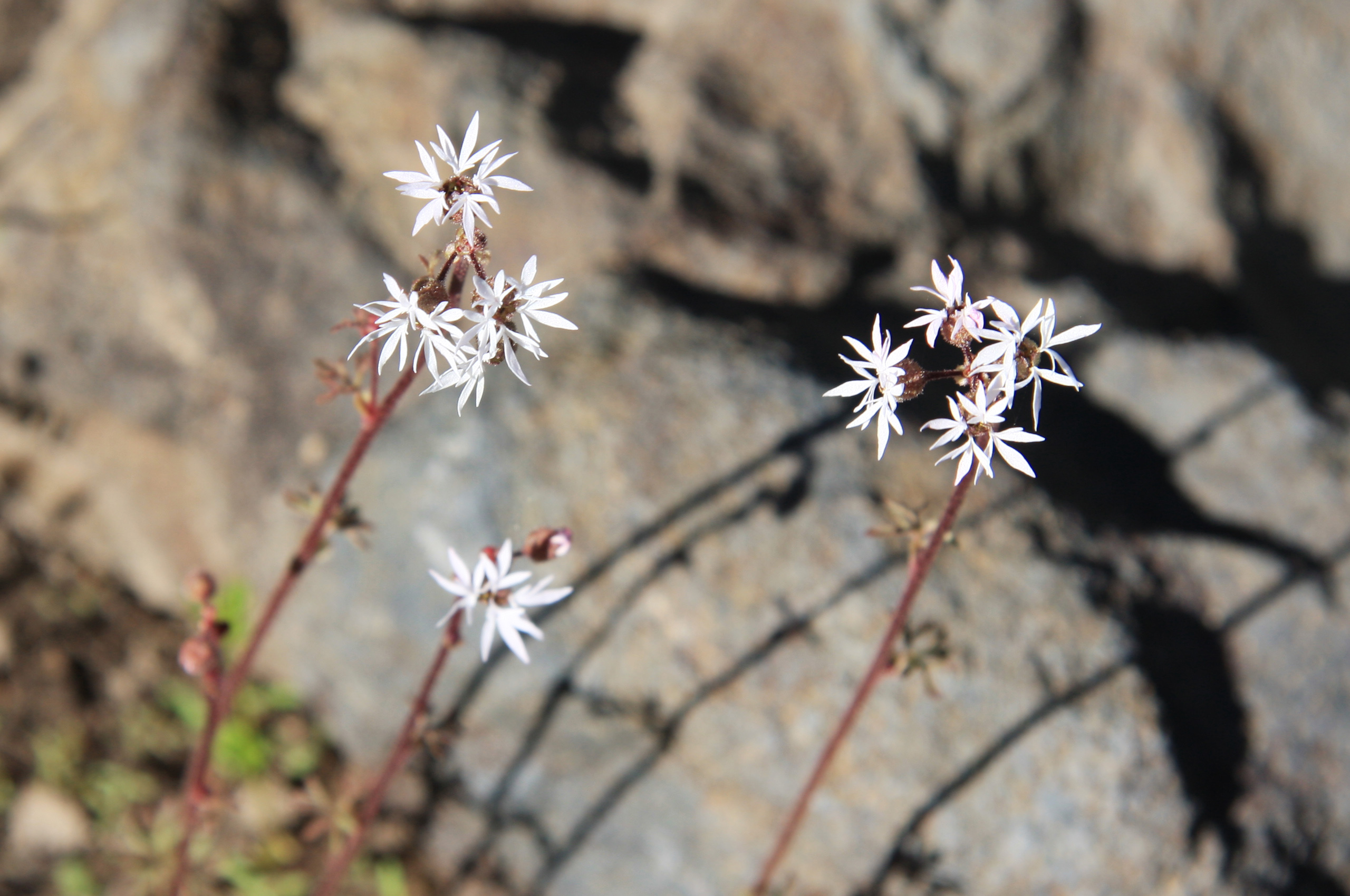
Lithophragma glabrum flowers close

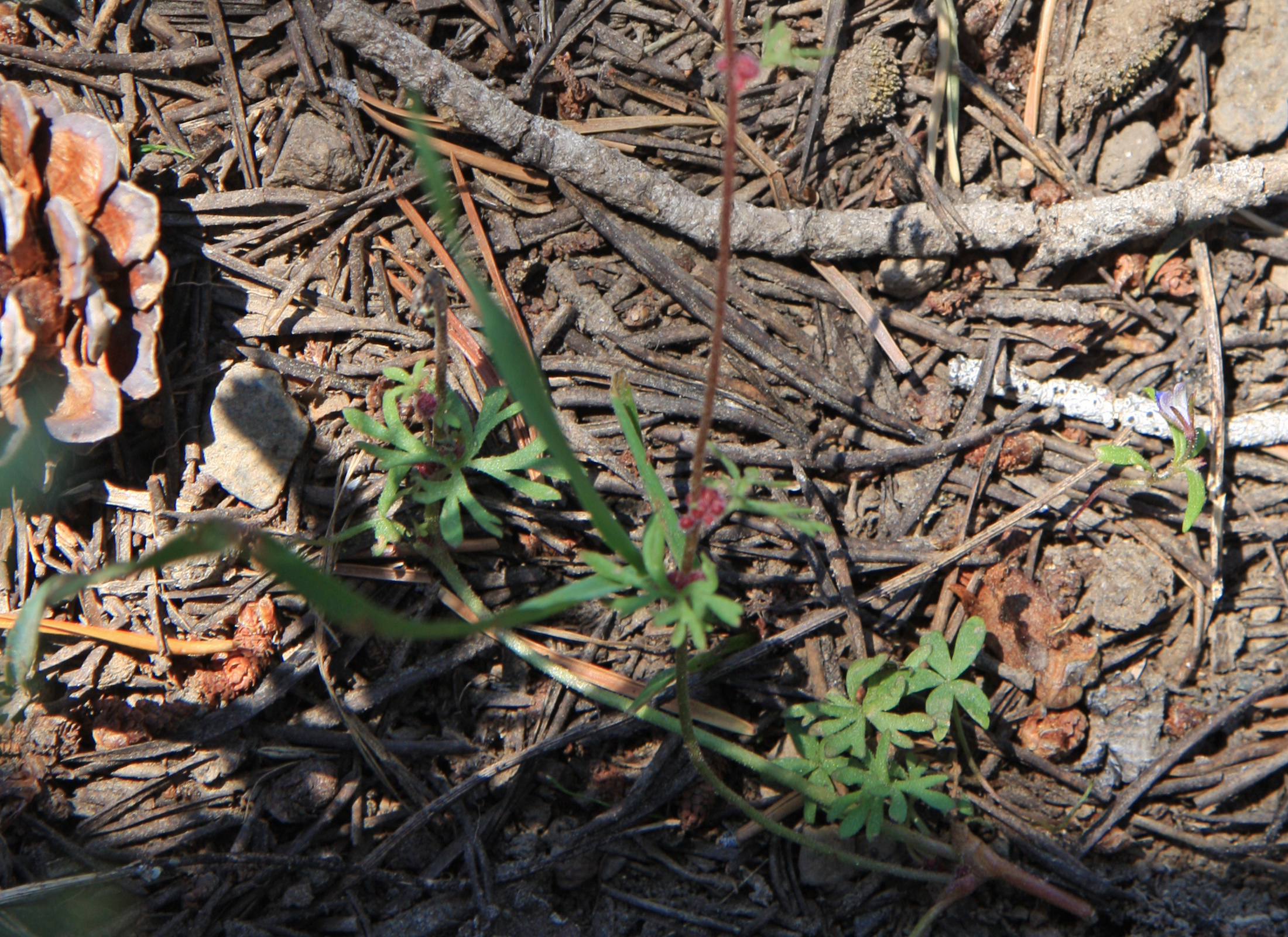
Rock star, divided basal leaves & red bulblets

== Habitat and range ==
It is native to western North America from British Columbia to California and Saskatchewan to Colorado, where it grows in many types of habitat.

== Growth pattern ==
It is a rhizomatous perennial herb growing erect or leaning with a slender glandular-pubescent flowering stem.

== Leaves and stems ==
The small leaves are mostly located on the lower part of the stem. Each is cut into five deep fingerlike lobes or divided into five leaflets, which may be toothed.

== Inflorescence and fruit ==
The stem bears 1 to 7 flowers, each in a cuplike calyx of hairy red or green sepals. The five petals are white or pink-tinged, up to about 7 millimeters long, and divided into several, often five, toothlike lobes. Next to the flowers are bracts with accompanying bulblets. The plant reproduces when these bulblets drop to the ground and take root.
