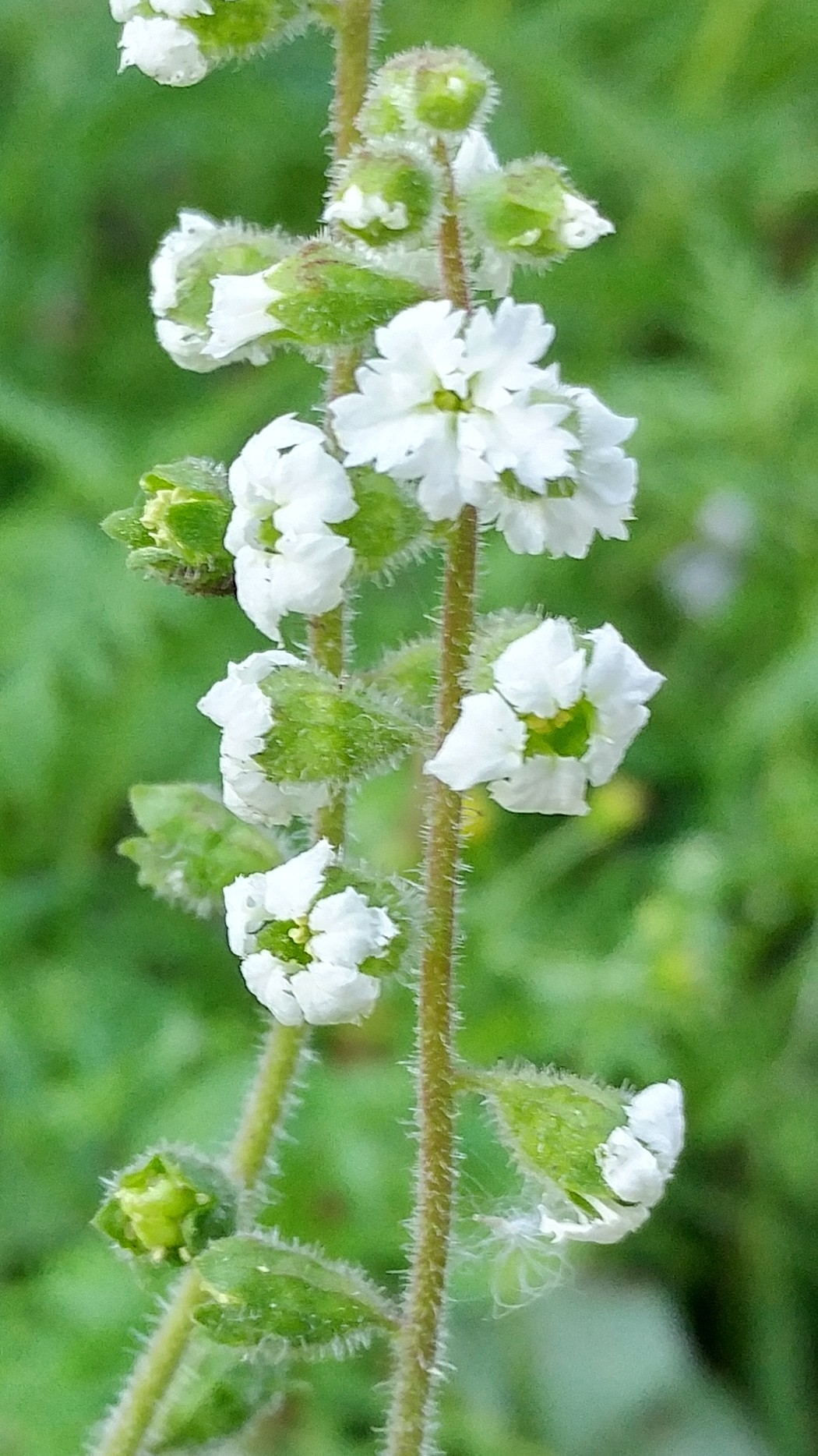

Conservation status
- Endangered (ESA)

Scientific classification
- Kingdom: Plantae
- Clade: Tracheophytes
- Clade: Angiosperms
- Clade: Eudicots
- Order: Saxifragales
- Family: Saxifragaceae
- Genus: Lithophragma
- Species: L. maximum

Binomial name
- Lithophragma maximum Bacig.

= Lithophragma maximum =

San Clemente Island woodland star

Species of flowering plant

Lithophragma maximum, known by the common name San Clemente Island woodland star, is a rare species of flowering plant in the saxifrage family. It is endemic to San Clemente Island, one of the eight Channel Islands of California. It is known from only about four kilometers of rocky coastal cliffs on the edge of the island. The plant was thought to be extinct until a few specimens were rediscovered in 1979. Only 200 individuals were tallied in a 1996 survey. In 1997 the plant was listed as an endangered species on the federal level.

== Description ==
Lithophragma maximum is a rhizomatous perennial herb growing erect or leaning with a slender naked flowering stem. The leaves are located on the lower part of the stem, each divided into three sharply toothed leaflets. The stem bears up to 25 flowers, each in a cuplike calyx of red or green sepals. The five petals are white or pink-tinged, approximately 4 millimeters long, and usually divided into about five pointed lobes.

== Conservation ==
As of 2000 there were over 400 individuals remaining, but about one fourth of these are located in one canyon. All of the plants grow on land owned and tended by the United States Navy. The two main threats to the species have been erosion of the local habitat and the presence of feral goats and pigs. The latter issue was resolved when the Navy removed the feral herbivores. A genetic analysis revealed a relatively high genetic diversity across populations of this woodland star, probably due to the isolation of the populations from each other in the rugged, steep habitat. This suggests that it is important to protect each population in order to conserve the genetic variance in each.
