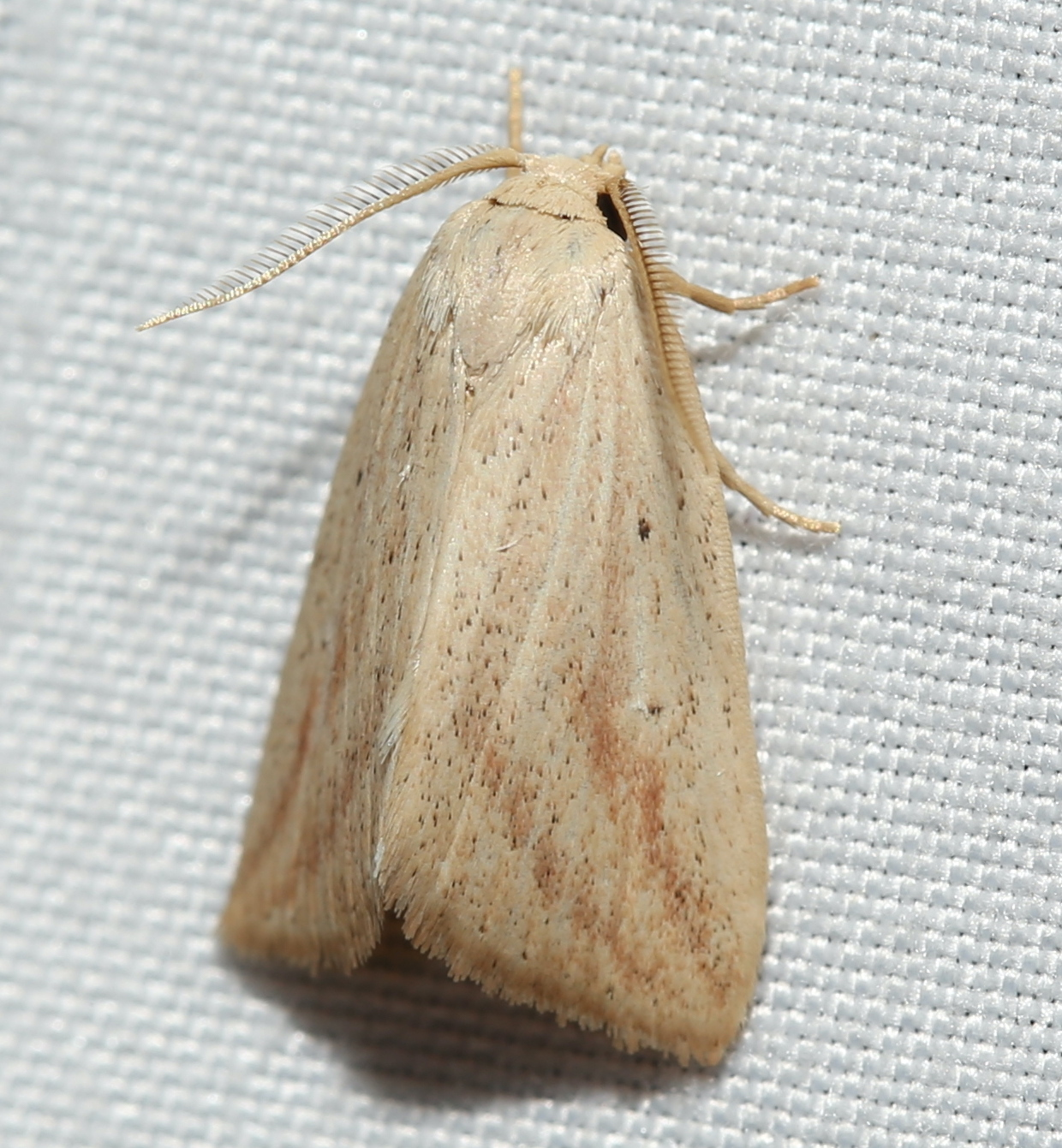

Scientific classification
- Kingdom: Animalia
- Phylum: Arthropoda
- Class: Insecta
- Order: Lepidoptera
- Superfamily: Noctuoidea
- Family: Erebidae
- Genus: Amolita
- Species: A. obliqua

Binomial name
- Amolita obliqua Smith, 1903

= Amolita obliqua =

Species of moth

Amolita obliqua, the oblique grass moth, is an owlet moth in the family Erebidae. The species was first described by Smith in 1903. It is found in North America.

The MONA or Hodges number for Amolita obliqua is 9819.
