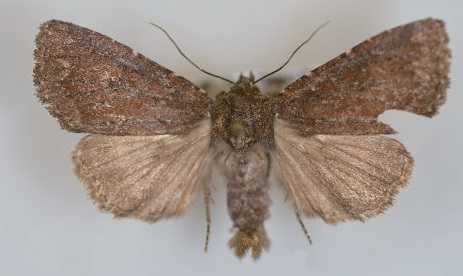
- Male
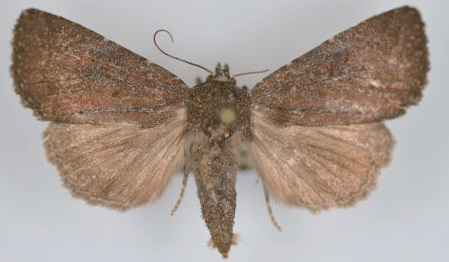
- Female

Scientific classification
- Domain: Eukaryota
- Kingdom: Animalia
- Phylum: Arthropoda
- Class: Insecta
- Order: Lepidoptera
- Superfamily: Noctuoidea
- Family: Noctuidae
- Genus: Aseptis
- Species: A. ferruginea

Binomial name
- Aseptis ferruginea Mustelin, 2000

= Aseptis ferruginea =

Species of moth

Aseptis ferruginea is a moth of the family Noctuidae first described by Tomas Mustelin in 2000. It is endemic to southern California. All records are from San Diego County, from an area between Boulevard-Manzanita near the Mexican border north to Lake Henshaw at altitudes of 800–1600 meters. The habitat consist of open oak forest, foothill chaparral, and in the mountain-desert transition zone.

The wingspan is 35.5–37 mm. The forewings are brown, distinctly reddish, deep claret when fresh and rustier when worn, and the veins are usually black. Most specimens have a clearly marked dark-filled reniform spot and a jagged pale subterminal line. The hindwing is distinctly paler than the forewing. Adults are on wing from late June to August.

== Etymology ==
The species name is derived from Latin ferruginea (meaning rusty).
