= Coenodomus schausi =

Scientific classification
- Domain: Eukaryota
- Kingdom: Animalia
- Phylum: Arthropoda
- Class: Insecta
- Order: Lepidoptera
- Family: Pyralidae
- Genus: Coenodomus
- Species: C. schausi

Binomial name
- Coenodomus schausi (West, 1931)

Synonyms
- Stericta schausi West, 1931

Species of moth

Coenodomus schausi is a species of snout moth in the genus Coenodomus. It is known from the Philippines.
