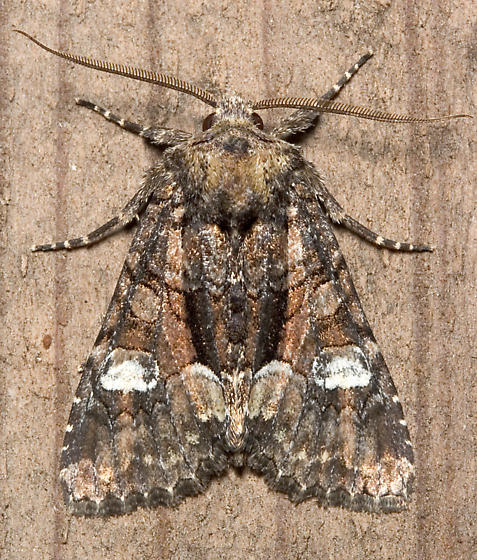

Scientific classification
- Kingdom: Animalia
- Phylum: Arthropoda
- Class: Insecta
- Order: Lepidoptera
- Superfamily: Noctuoidea
- Family: Noctuidae
- Genus: Fishia
- Species: F. illocata

Binomial name
- Fishia illocata (Walker, 1857)

Synonyms
- Oligia illocata (Walker, 1857); Hadena illocata Walker, 1857; Dryobota stigmata Grote, 1876

= Fishia illocata =

Species of moth

Fishia illocata, the wandering brocade, is a moth of the family Noctuidae. The species was first described by Francis Walker in 1857. It is found from coast to coast in North America. It is abundant in the wet coastal forests and in wet conifer forests of the northern Rocky Mountains.

The wingspan is about 35 mm. Adults are on wing in fall.

The larvae feed on the foliage of Alnus species.
