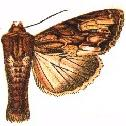

Scientific classification
- Domain: Eukaryota
- Kingdom: Animalia
- Phylum: Arthropoda
- Class: Insecta
- Order: Lepidoptera
- Superfamily: Noctuoidea
- Family: Noctuidae
- Genus: Apamea
- Species: A. auranticolor

Binomial name
- Apamea auranticolor Grote, 1873

Synonyms
- Hadena auranticolor

= Apamea auranticolor =

Species of moth

Apamea auranticolor is a moth of the family Noctuidae. It is found throughout western North America.

The wingspan is about 36 mm.

== Subspecies ==
- Apamea auranticolor auranticolor
- Apamea auranticolor barnesii

Apamea sora was formerly considered to be a subspecies of Apamea auranticolor.
