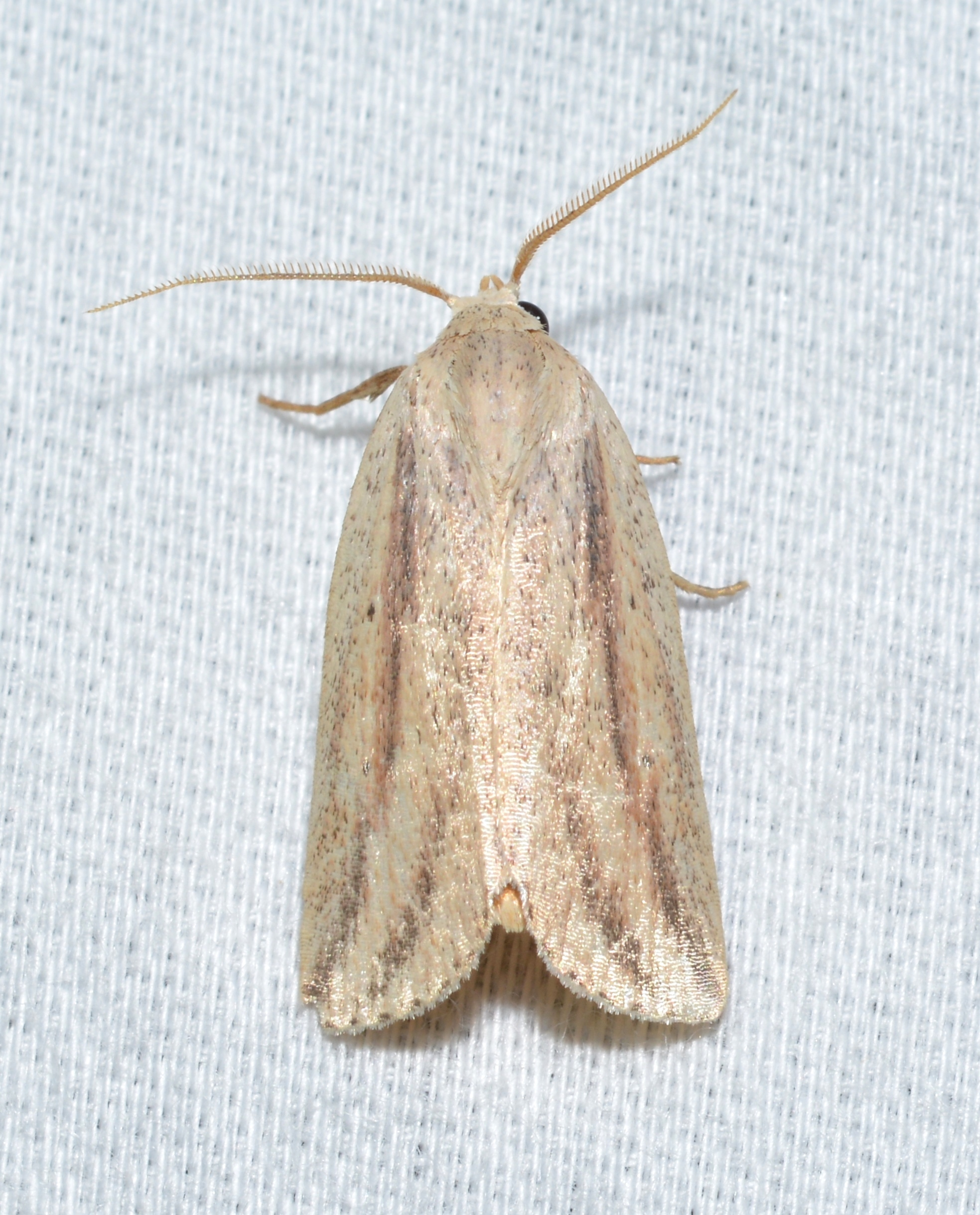
- Amolita fessa

Scientific classification
- Kingdom: Animalia
- Phylum: Arthropoda
- Class: Insecta
- Order: Lepidoptera
- Superfamily: Noctuoidea
- Family: Erebidae
- Tribe: Omopterini
- Genus: Amolita; Grote, 1874

Synonyms
- Parvapenna Kaye, 1901

= Amolita =

Genus of moths

Amolita is a genus of moths in the family Erebidae.

== Species ==
- Amolita delicata Barnes & McDunnough, 1912
- Amolita fessa Grote, 1874 – feeble grass moth
- Amolita fratercula Barnes & McDunnough, 1912
- Amolita intensa Dyar, 1914
- Amolita irrorata Hampson, 1910
- Amolita nyctichroa Hampson, 1910
- Amolita obliqua Smith, 1903 – oblique grass moth
- Amolita paranoma Dyar, 1914
- Amolita pepita Dyar, 1914
- Amolita perstriata Hampson, 1910
- Amolita roseola Smith, 1903
- Amolita sentalis (Kaye, 1901)
- Amolita solitaria Dyar, 1914
