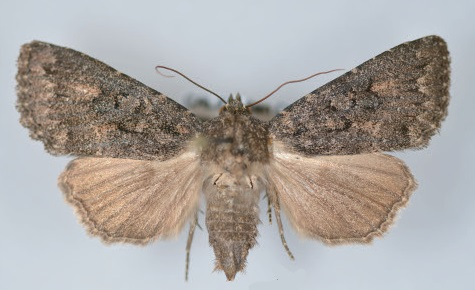
- Female
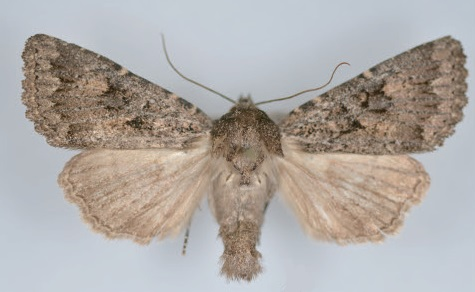
- Male

Scientific classification
- Kingdom: Animalia
- Phylum: Arthropoda
- Class: Insecta
- Order: Lepidoptera
- Superfamily: Noctuoidea
- Family: Noctuidae
- Genus: Aseptis
- Species: A. fumeola

Binomial name
- Aseptis fumeola (Hampson, 1908)

Synonyms
- Trachea fumeola Hampson, 1908; Trachea probata Barnes & McDunnough, 1910

= Aseptis fumeola =

Species of moth

Aseptis fumeola is a moth of the family Noctuidae first described by George Hampson in 1908. It is found in the US state of Arizona, southern and central California, southern Nevada and south-eastern Utah. The habitat consists of foothills and mountains in dry chaparral, parkland, and conifer forest.

The wingspan is 38.5–45 mm. The forewings are dark, slightly shiny gray brown with contrasting dark patches, particularly in the basal and postmedial areas. The medial area typically is paler with reddish tan near the conspicuous large black reniform spot, small round orbicular spot, and short claviform spot. The reddish postreniform patch is relatively prominent for the species group. The postmedial line usually is well marked and curves around the reniform spot. The serrated subterminal line is a prominent border between the postmedial and paler subterminal areas. The hindwing is smoky gray brown, darker in females. Adults are on wing in June and July.

The larvae were found and reared on new leaves of Arctostaphylos species, including Arctostaphylos pungens. The larvae are pale green.
