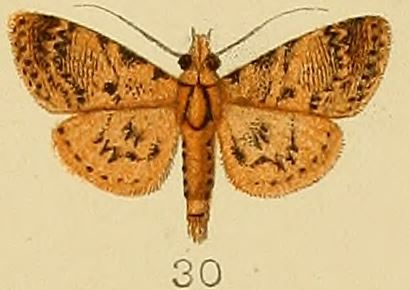
- Coenodomus cornucalis

Scientific classification
- Domain: Eukaryota
- Kingdom: Animalia
- Phylum: Arthropoda
- Class: Insecta
- Order: Lepidoptera
- Family: Pyralidae
- Subfamily: Epipaschiinae
- Genus: Coenodomus; Walsingham, 1888

Synonyms
- Alippa Aurivillius, 1894; Dyaria Neumoegen, 1893

= Coenodomus =

Genus of moths

Coenodomus is a genus of snout moths. It was described by Walsingham in 1888, and is known from India, Papua New Guinea, Bhutan, the Philippines, the United States, Indonesia, China, and Sri Lanka.

== Species ==
- Coenodomus aglossalis
- Coenodomus cornucalis (Kenrick, 1907)
- Coenodomus dudgeoni
- Coenodomus fumosalis Hampson, 1903
- Coenodomus hampsoni West, 1931
- Coenodomus hockingi Walsingham, 1888
- Coenodomus melanochlora
- Coenodomus rotundinidus
- Coenodomus rubrescens
- Coenodomus schausi
- Coenodomus trichasema (Hampson, 1916) (from Sri Lanka)
