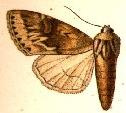

Scientific classification
- Domain: Eukaryota
- Kingdom: Animalia
- Phylum: Arthropoda
- Class: Insecta
- Order: Lepidoptera
- Superfamily: Noctuoidea
- Family: Noctuidae
- Genus: Fishia
- Species: F. dispar

Binomial name
- Fishia dispar Smith, 1900

Synonyms
- Andropolia dispar (Smith, 1900); Polia dispar

= Fishia dispar =

Species of moth

Fishia dispar is a moth in the family Noctuidae. It is found in North America, including Colorado and Utah.
