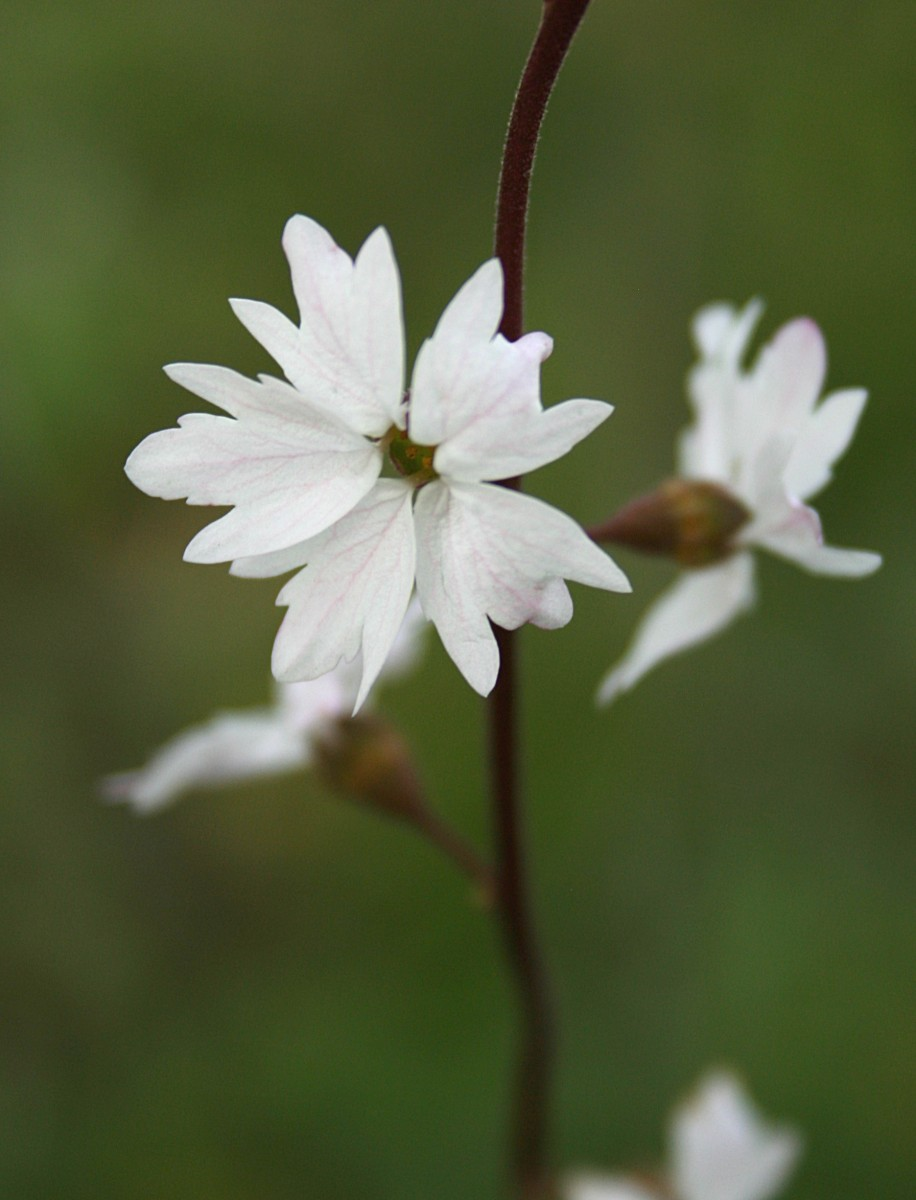
- Lithophragma sp.

Scientific classification
- Kingdom: Plantae
- Clade: Embryophytes
- Clade: Tracheophytes
- Clade: Spermatophytes
- Clade: Angiosperms
- Clade: Eudicots
- Order: Saxifragales
- Family: Saxifragaceae
- Genus: Lithophragma (Nutt.) Torr. & A.Gray (1840), nom. cons.

Species
- 10, see text

Synonyms
- Pleurendotria Raf. (1837)

= Lithophragma =

Genus of flowering plants

Lithophragma is a genus of flowering plants in the saxifrage family containing about nine species native to western North America. These plants are known generally as woodland stars. The petals of the flowers are usually bright white with deep, long lobes or teeth. Each petal may look like three to five petals, when at closer inspection the lobes fuse into a single petal at its base. Most species reproduce via bulblets instead of seeds. L. maximum is a federally listed endangered species. Lithophragma specifically coevolved with moths of the genus Greya, who pollinate and only lay eggs on Lithophragma plants.

== Species ==
There are 10 species. Plants of the World Online and the Flora of North America North of Mexico elevate Lithophragma trifoliatum to species status, but the Jepson Manual considers it to be a variety of L. parviflorum (L. parviflorum var. trifoliatum) restricted to California.

- Lithophragma affine A.Gray – San Francisco woodland star
- Lithophragma bolanderi A.Gray – Bolander's woodland star
- Lithophragma campanulatum Howell – Siskiyou Mountain woodland star
- Lithophragma cymbalaria Torr. & A.Gray – mission woodland star
- Lithophragma glabrum Nutt. – bulbous woodland star
- Lithophragma heterophyllum(Hook. & Arn.) Torr. & A.Gray – hillside woodland star
- Lithophragma maximum Bacig. – San Clemente Island woodland star
- Lithophragma parviflorum (Hook.) Nutt. – smallflower woodland star
- Lithophragma tenellum Nutt. – slender woodland star
- Lithophragma trifoliatum Eastw. (syn. L. parviflorum var. trifoliatum (Eastw.) Jeps.)
