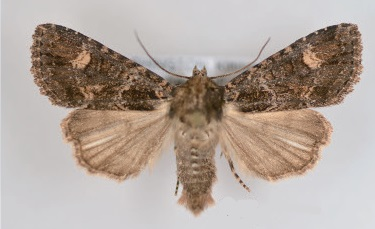
- Male
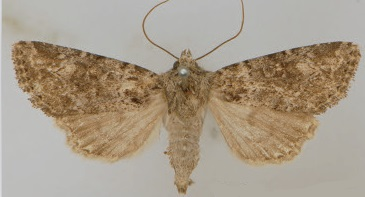
- Female

Scientific classification
- Kingdom: Animalia
- Phylum: Arthropoda
- Class: Insecta
- Order: Lepidoptera
- Superfamily: Noctuoidea
- Family: Noctuidae
- Genus: Aseptis
- Species: A. binotata

Binomial name
- Aseptis binotata (Walker, 1865)

Synonyms
- Mamestra binotata Walker, 1865; Hadena extersa Walker, 1865; Miana rubiginosa Walker, 1865; Hadena curvata Grote, 1874; Taeniocampa paviae Strecker, 1874; Aseptis paviae; Hadena genitrix Grote, 1878; Aseptis genetrix; Hadena inconspicua Smith, 1893 [nomen nudum]; Hadena dilara Strecker, 1898; Aseptis dilara; Hadena bultata Smith, 1906; Aseptis bultata; Trachea cara Barnes & McDunnough, 1912; Aseptis cara

= Aseptis binotata =

Rusty shoulder knot moth

Species of moth

Aseptis binotata, the rusty shoulder knot moth, is a moth of the family Noctuidae. The species was first described by Francis Walker in 1865. It is found widespread in western North America, west of south-central Alberta, Wyoming, and Nebraska. Along the Pacific Coast it occurs from northern Mexico to south-central British Columbia. It can be found from sea level to altitudes over 2000 meters in a variety of habitats from dense forest to shrub desert.

The wingspan is 29.5–35 mm. It is the most variable species in the genus Aseptis with respect to forewing color and pattern strength. It may be brownish, warm dark brown, pale to medium gray brown, yellowish light brown, or reddish brown depending on locality. The most noticeable marking in dark specimens is the large pale yellowish postreniform patch, which is bisected by the dark postmedial line. The antemedial line is strongly convex laterally and is filled with light tan. Black forewing markings include a series of wedges near the outer margin below the apex, the outlines of the three forewing spots, and in most specimens a short black basal dash. Pale specimens can be washed out or have contrasting dark markings. In the south the flight begins in March at low elevations and in April to July in the mountains. In the north the flight begins later and lasts into August.

The larvae feed on various broadleaf trees and shrubs, including big-leaf maple, ocean spray, and Ceanothus species. Other recorded food plants include Oemleria, Symphoricarpos and Ribes species. The larva is green with a white and red lateral stripe.
