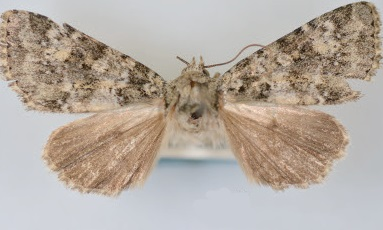
- Female
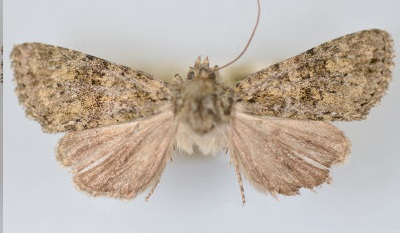
- Male

Scientific classification
- Kingdom: Animalia
- Phylum: Arthropoda
- Clade: Pancrustacea
- Class: Insecta
- Order: Lepidoptera
- Superfamily: Noctuoidea
- Family: Noctuidae
- Genus: Aseptis
- Species: A. lichena

Binomial name
- Aseptis lichena (Barnes & McDunnough, 1912)

Synonyms
- Andropolia lichena Barnes & McDunnough, 1912

= Aseptis lichena =

Species of moth

Aseptis lichena is a moth of the family Noctuidae first described by William Barnes and James Halliday McDunnough in 1912. It is found in the United States in south-central California (Tehachapi Mountains) and north-central California (near Blairsden, Lake Tahoe, and Yosemite Park). It is also reported from Mount Shasta, Mount Lassen, and other locations in northern California.

The wingspan is 33–39 mm. The forewings are powdery dark olive green, produced by a mixture of black, green, and yellow scales. Aseptis lichena is darker green than the similar Aseptis pseudolichena. Adults are on wing in mid-summer.
