= John Bernhardt Smith =

American entomologist (1858–1912)

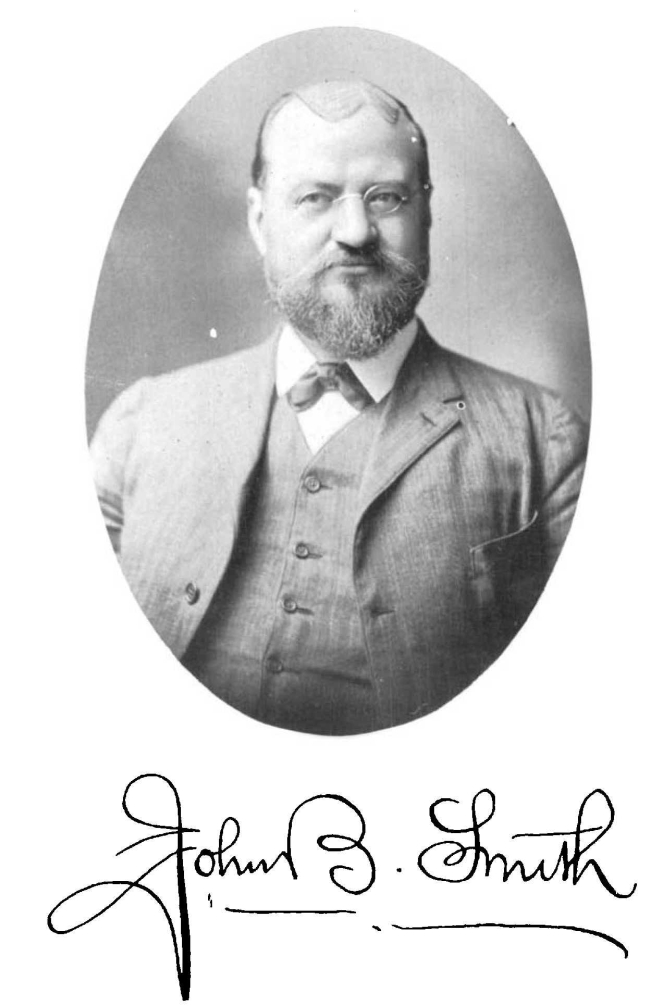

John Bernhardt Smith (November 21, 1858 – March 12, 1912) was an American professor of entomology who specialized in systematics and economic entomology while also serving as the State Entomologist of New Jersey. Smith is remembered in insect taxonomy for the conflict that he had with Harrison Dyar. The standard insect specimen box known as the "Schmitt box" is named after his German-born father.

== Biography ==
Smith was born in New York, into a German family of cabinet makers. He was an avid insect collector and his father, Johann Schmitt (Anglicized as John Schmitt) made special cabinet boxes for his son's collections. Smith studied locally, and went on to study law, which he practiced from 1880 to 1884. In 1884, he changed fields to work as a special agent in the Division of Entomology in the US Department of Agriculture under C.V. Riley. In 1886, Smith was hired by the Smithsonian's National Museum in Washington as an assistant curator of insects. Along with C.V. Riley, Smith helped in standardizing the sizes of the insect cabinet boxes with his father, and these boxes continue to be known as "Schmitt boxes." In 1889 he succeeded George D. Hulst and served as professor of entomology at Rutgers College and as an entomologist at the experiment station. Smith took a special interest in the Noctuidae, proposing as many as 995 species. He was appointed State Entomologist of New Jersey in 1894, a position he held until his death. He edited Entomological Americana from 1882 to 1890 and published several books including the Glossary of Entomology, Economic Entomology (1896), Monograph of the Noctuidae of Boreal America, and Our Insect Friends and Enemies (1909). He received an honorary doctor of science degree from Rutgers College in 1891. From 1900 he took a special interest in mosquitoes and their management.

== Taxonomic battles ==
Smith's 1891 checklist was criticized by the entomologist Harrison Dyar and this grew into a serious rivalry. Dyar published his own "A List of North American Lepidoptera" as a counter to Smith's list. Dyar clashed on matters of taxonomy, mostly on nomenclatural priority, with C.V. Riley, A.R. Grote, and H. Strecker among others. The dispute with Smith began with criticisms over Smith's checklist of 1892. In 1903 Smith named a moth as Euclidia dyari, which though appearing like an honor, was a name to replace another that the two had argued over. Dyar likewise created Protorthodes smithii in 1904. Smith took exception to Dyar's criticism of Rev. Hulst on identifications and nomenclature. Hulst had recently died and had bequeathed his specimens to the Rutgers collection and Smith refused to lend these to the US National Museum collection overseen by Dyar. Smith even wrote to Dyar "If you object that I am allowing personal consideration to retard scientific knowledge I will plead guilty." After a fire in Rutgers in 1903 Dyar wrote a letter that placing specimens in the Washington collection would be a safeguard. Again Smith refused, with a copy to L.O. Howard. After Smith began to work in mosquitoes in 1901, there appeared to be a thaw in relations with Dyar helping in some identifications. When Dyar sought some larval specimens, Smith again refused to loan them and it again led to a downward spiral in their relations. In 1909 he clashed with Dyar again over credit on the discovery of the breeding habits of mosquitoes in Dublin, New Jersey. With Smith's death the battled died out but the rivalry became legend among insect taxonomists with embellished (incorrect) versions stating that Smith created the genus Dyaria (pun on Diarrhoea) to spite the latter. It was erected in fact by Berthold Neumoegen in 1893. Later workers have noted that Smith was usually wrong in the claims he made in nomenclatural debates with Dyar and Grote. Smith did not designate holotypes and labelled several specimens as types of a given species (these are treated as syntypes under Art. 73.2 of the ICZN Code).
