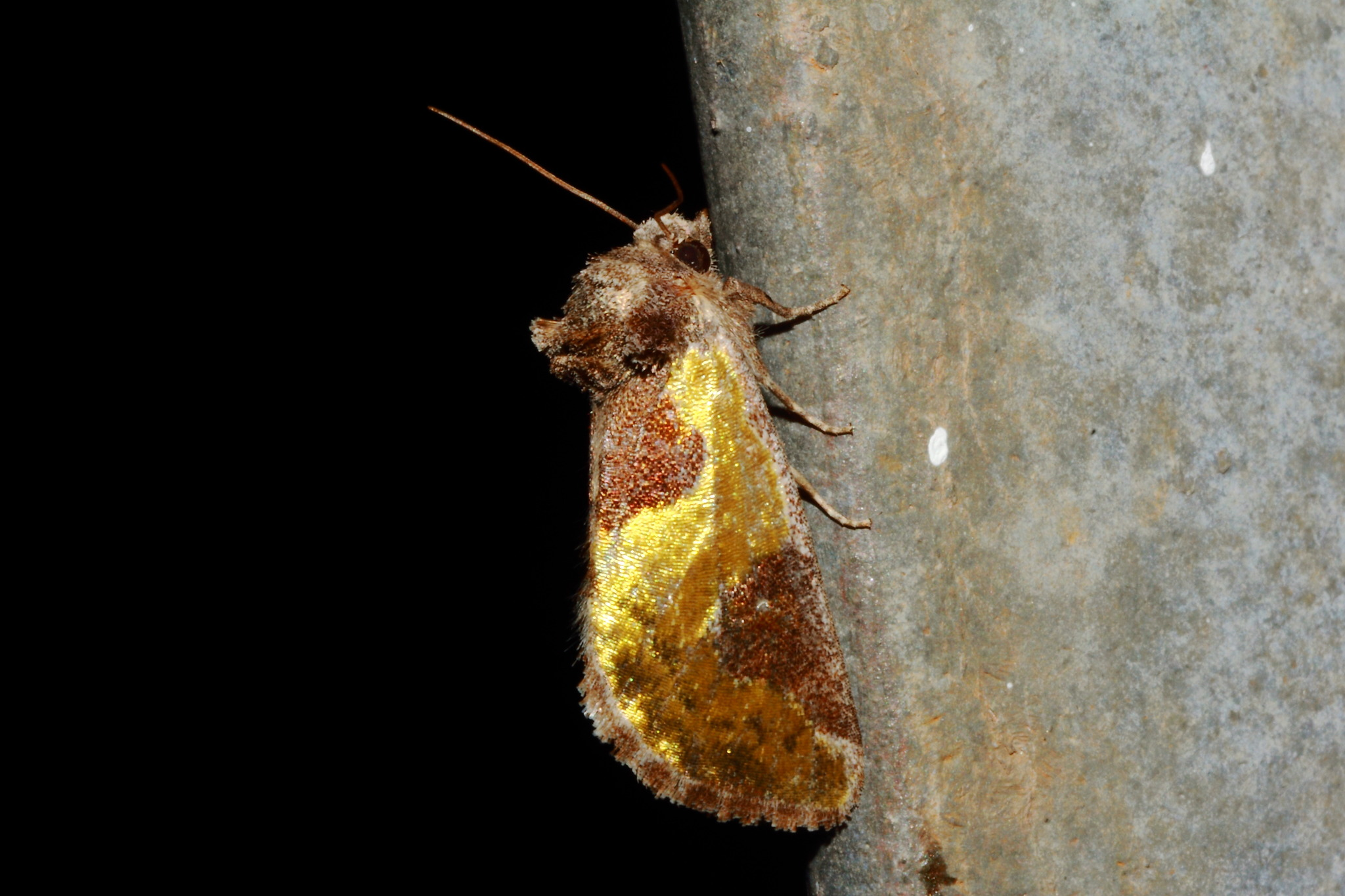
- Chalcopasta fulgens, México

Scientific classification
- Kingdom: Animalia
- Phylum: Arthropoda
- Class: Insecta
- Order: Lepidoptera
- Superfamily: Noctuoidea
- Family: Noctuidae
- Subfamily: Stiriinae
- Tribe: Stiriini
- Genus: Chalcopasta
- Species: C. fulgens

Binomial name
- Chalcopasta fulgens Barnes & McDunnough, 1912

= Chalcopasta fulgens =

Species of moth

Chalcopasta fulgens is a moth in the family Noctuidae (the owlet moths). It was described by William Barnes and James Halliday McDunnough in the year 1912.

This species is found in the southwest United States and Mexico.

The MONA or Hodges number for Chalcopasta fulgens is 9777.
