= Stiria blanchardi =

Scientific classification
- Domain: Eukaryota
- Kingdom: Animalia
- Phylum: Arthropoda
- Class: Insecta
- Order: Lepidoptera
- Superfamily: Noctuoidea
- Family: Noctuidae
- Subfamily: Stiriinae
- Tribe: Stiriini
- Genus: Stiria
- Species: S. blanchardi

Binomial name
- Stiria blanchardi (Hogue, 1966)

Species of moth

Stiria blanchardi is a species of moth in the family Noctuidae (the owlet moths). It is found in North America.

The MONA or Hodges number for Stiria blanchardi is 9783.
