= Stiria dyari =

Scientific classification
- Domain: Eukaryota
- Kingdom: Animalia
- Phylum: Arthropoda
- Class: Insecta
- Order: Lepidoptera
- Superfamily: Noctuoidea
- Family: Noctuidae
- Subfamily: Stiriinae
- Tribe: Stiriini
- Genus: Stiria
- Species: S. dyari

Binomial name
- Stiria dyari Hill, 1924

Species of moth

Stiria dyari is a species of moth in the family Noctuidae (the owlet moths). It is found in North America.

The MONA or Hodges number for Stiria dyari is 9786.
