= Chrysoecia scira =

Scientific classification
- Kingdom: Animalia
- Phylum: Arthropoda
- Class: Insecta
- Order: Lepidoptera
- Superfamily: Noctuoidea
- Family: Noctuidae
- Subfamily: Stiriinae
- Tribe: Stiriini
- Genus: Chrysoecia
- Species: C. scira

Binomial name
- Chrysoecia scira (H. Druce, 1889)

Species of moth

Chrysoecia scira is a species of moth in the family Noctuidae (the owlet moths). It is found in North America.

The MONA or Hodges number for Chrysoecia scira is 9761.
