= Chalcopasta acema =

Scientific classification
- Kingdom: Animalia
- Phylum: Arthropoda
- Class: Insecta
- Order: Lepidoptera
- Superfamily: Noctuoidea
- Family: Noctuidae
- Subfamily: Stiriinae
- Tribe: Stiriini
- Genus: Chalcopasta
- Species: C. acema

Binomial name
- Chalcopasta acema (H. Druce, 1889)

Species of moth

Chalcopasta acema is a species of moth in the family Noctuidae (the owlet moths). It is found in North America.

The MONA or Hodges number for Chalcopasta acema is 9778.
