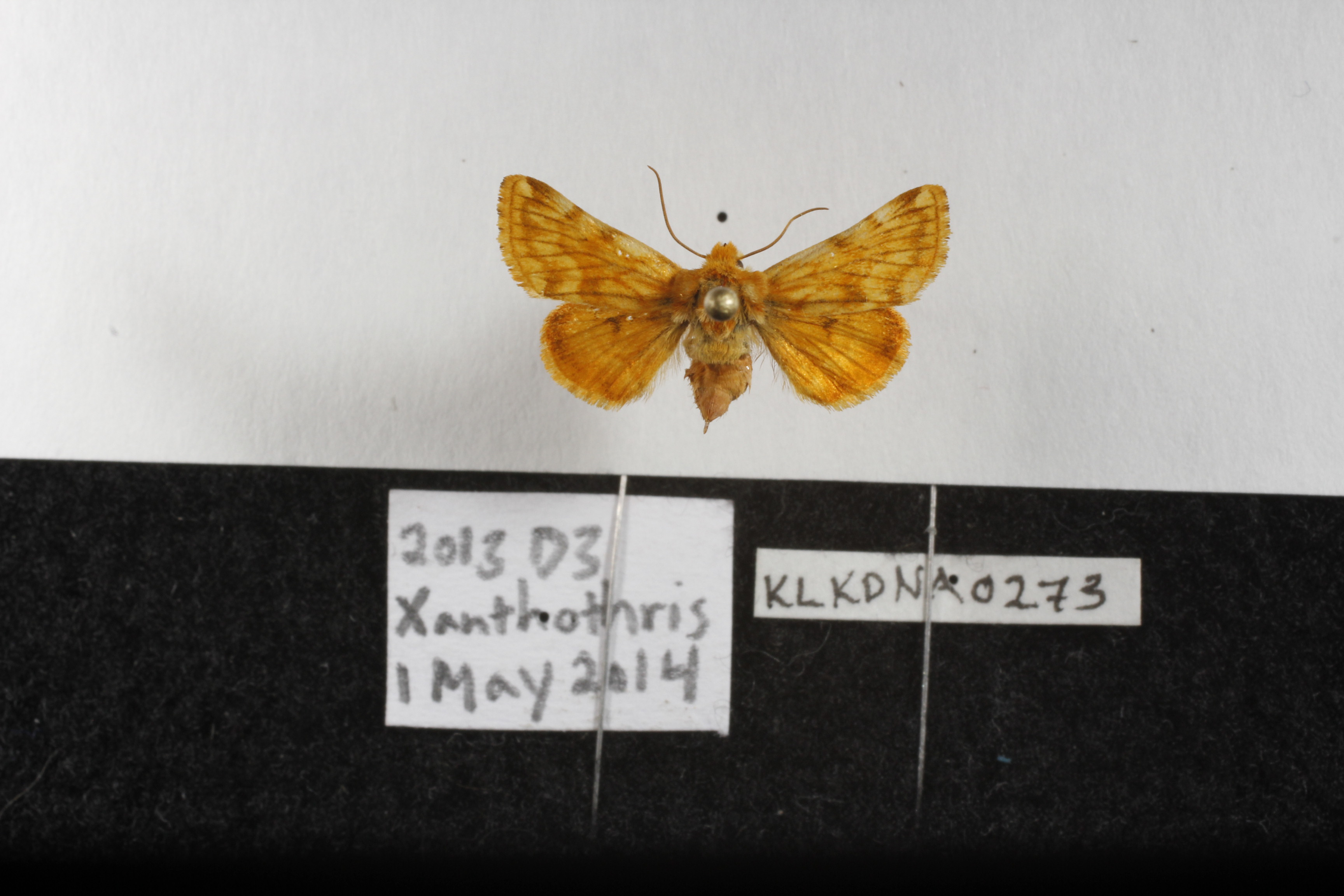

Scientific classification
- Domain: Eukaryota
- Kingdom: Animalia
- Phylum: Arthropoda
- Class: Insecta
- Order: Lepidoptera
- Superfamily: Noctuoidea
- Family: Noctuidae
- Subfamily: Stiriinae
- Tribe: Stiriini
- Genus: Xanthothrix
- Species: X. neumoegeni

Binomial name
- Xanthothrix neumoegeni H. Edwards, 1881

= Xanthothrix neumoegeni =

Species of moth

Xanthothrix neumoegeni is a species of moth in the family Noctuidae (the owlet moths). It is found in North America.

The MONA or Hodges number for Xanthothrix neumoegeni is 9771.
