= Plagiomimicus caesium =

Scientific classification
- Domain: Eukaryota
- Kingdom: Animalia
- Phylum: Arthropoda
- Class: Insecta
- Order: Lepidoptera
- Superfamily: Noctuoidea
- Family: Noctuidae
- Subfamily: Stiriinae
- Tribe: Stiriini
- Genus: Plagiomimicus
- Species: P. caesium

Binomial name
- Plagiomimicus caesium (A. Blanchard & Knudson, 1984)

Species of moth

Plagiomimicus caesium is a species of moth in the family Noctuidae (the owlet moths). It is found in North America.

The MONA or Hodges number for Plagiomimicus caesium is 9748.1.
