= Stiria sulphurea =

Scientific classification
- Domain: Eukaryota
- Kingdom: Animalia
- Phylum: Arthropoda
- Class: Insecta
- Order: Lepidoptera
- Superfamily: Noctuoidea
- Family: Noctuidae
- Subfamily: Stiriinae
- Tribe: Stiriini
- Genus: Stiria
- Species: S. sulphurea

Binomial name
- Stiria sulphurea Neumögen, 1882

Species of moth

Stiria sulphurea is a species of moth in the family Noctuidae (the owlet moths). It is found in North America.

The MONA or Hodges number for Stiria sulphurea is 9787.
