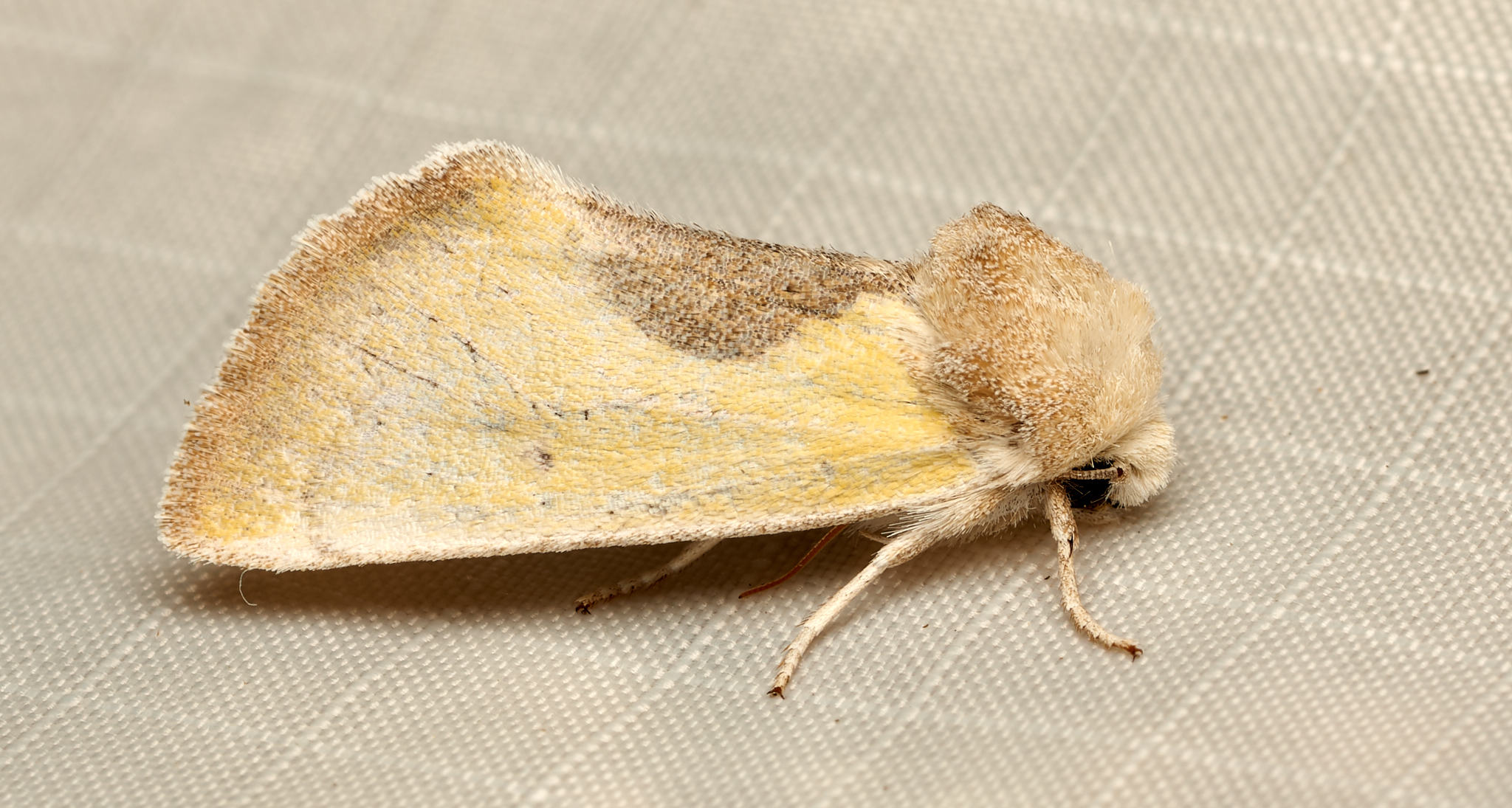

Scientific classification
- Kingdom: Animalia
- Phylum: Arthropoda
- Class: Insecta
- Order: Lepidoptera
- Superfamily: Noctuoidea
- Family: Noctuidae
- Subfamily: Stiriinae
- Tribe: Stiriini
- Genus: Stiria
- Species: S. consuela

Binomial name
- Stiria consuela Strecker, 1900

= Stiria consuela =

Species of moth

Stiria consuela is a species of moth in the owlet moth family Noctuidae. It is found in North America.
