= Plagiomimicus triplagiatus =

Scientific classification
- Domain: Eukaryota
- Kingdom: Animalia
- Phylum: Arthropoda
- Class: Insecta
- Order: Lepidoptera
- Superfamily: Noctuoidea
- Family: Noctuidae
- Subfamily: Stiriinae
- Tribe: Stiriini
- Genus: Plagiomimicus
- Species: P. triplagiatus

Binomial name
- Plagiomimicus triplagiatus Smith, 1890

Species of moth

Plagiomimicus triplagiatus is a species of moth in the family Noctuidae (the owlet moths). It is found in North America.

The MONA or Hodges number for Plagiomimicus triplagiatus is 9753.
