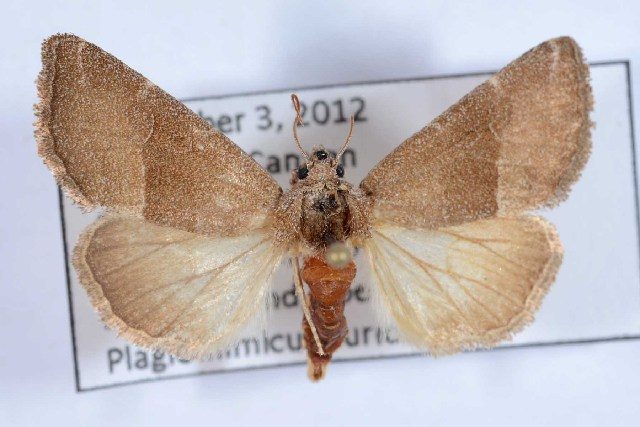

Scientific classification
- Domain: Eukaryota
- Kingdom: Animalia
- Phylum: Arthropoda
- Class: Insecta
- Order: Lepidoptera
- Superfamily: Noctuoidea
- Family: Noctuidae
- Subfamily: Stiriinae
- Tribe: Stiriini
- Genus: Plagiomimicus
- Species: P. curiosum

Binomial name
- Plagiomimicus curiosum (Neumögen, 1884)

= Plagiomimicus curiosum =

Species of moth

Plagiomimicus curiosum is a species of moth in the family Noctuidae (the owlet moths).

The MONA or Hodges number for Plagiomimicus curiosum is 9747.
