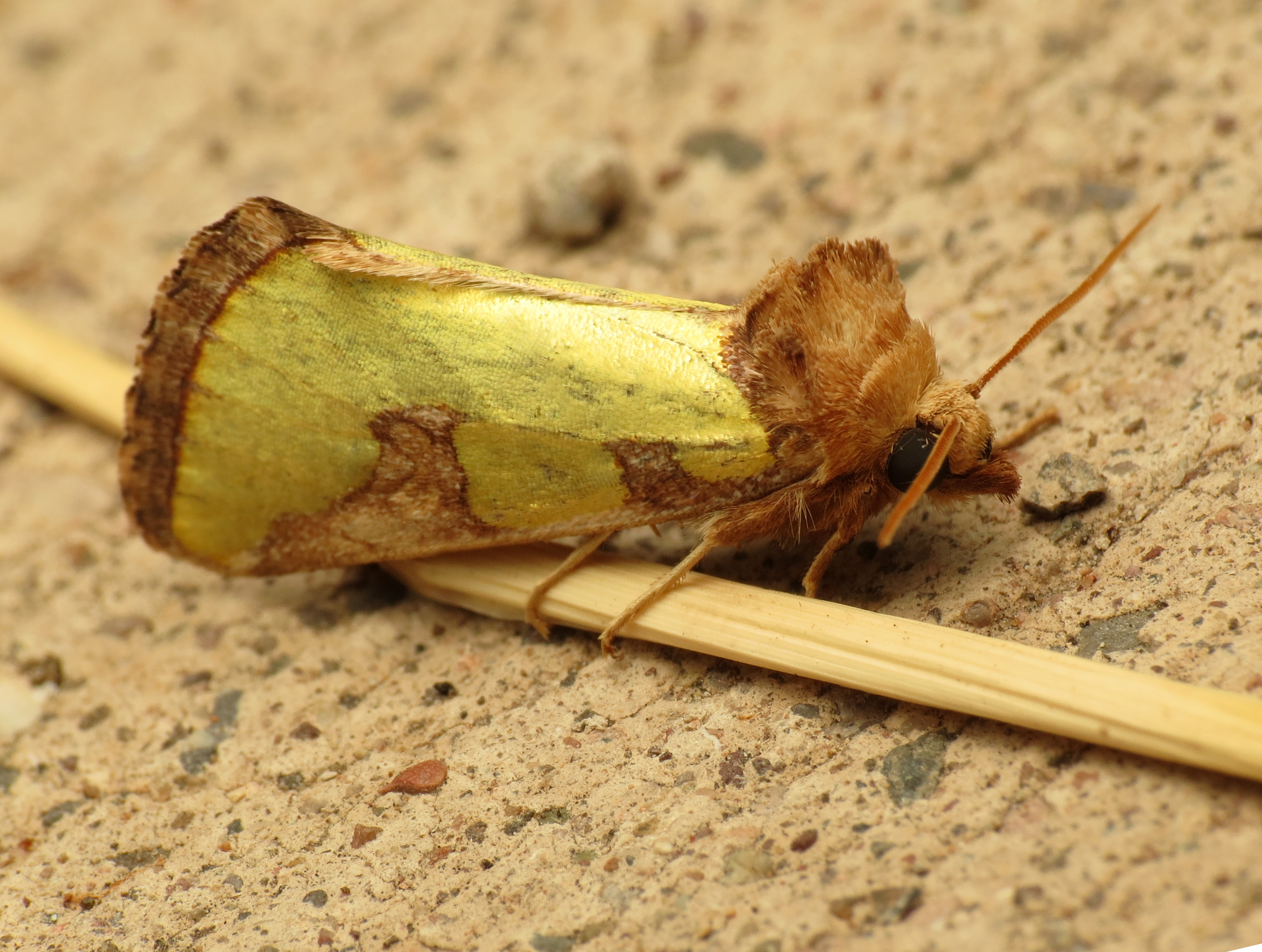

Scientific classification
- Domain: Eukaryota
- Kingdom: Animalia
- Phylum: Arthropoda
- Class: Insecta
- Order: Lepidoptera
- Superfamily: Noctuoidea
- Family: Noctuidae
- Subfamily: Stiriinae
- Tribe: Stiriini
- Genus: Chalcopasta
- Species: C. territans

Binomial name
- Chalcopasta territans (H. Edwards, 1884)

= Chalcopasta territans =

Species of moth

Chalcopasta territans is a moth in the family Noctuidae (the owlet moths) first described by Henry Edwards in 1884. It is found in North America.

The MONA or Hodges number for Chalcopasta territans is 9775.
