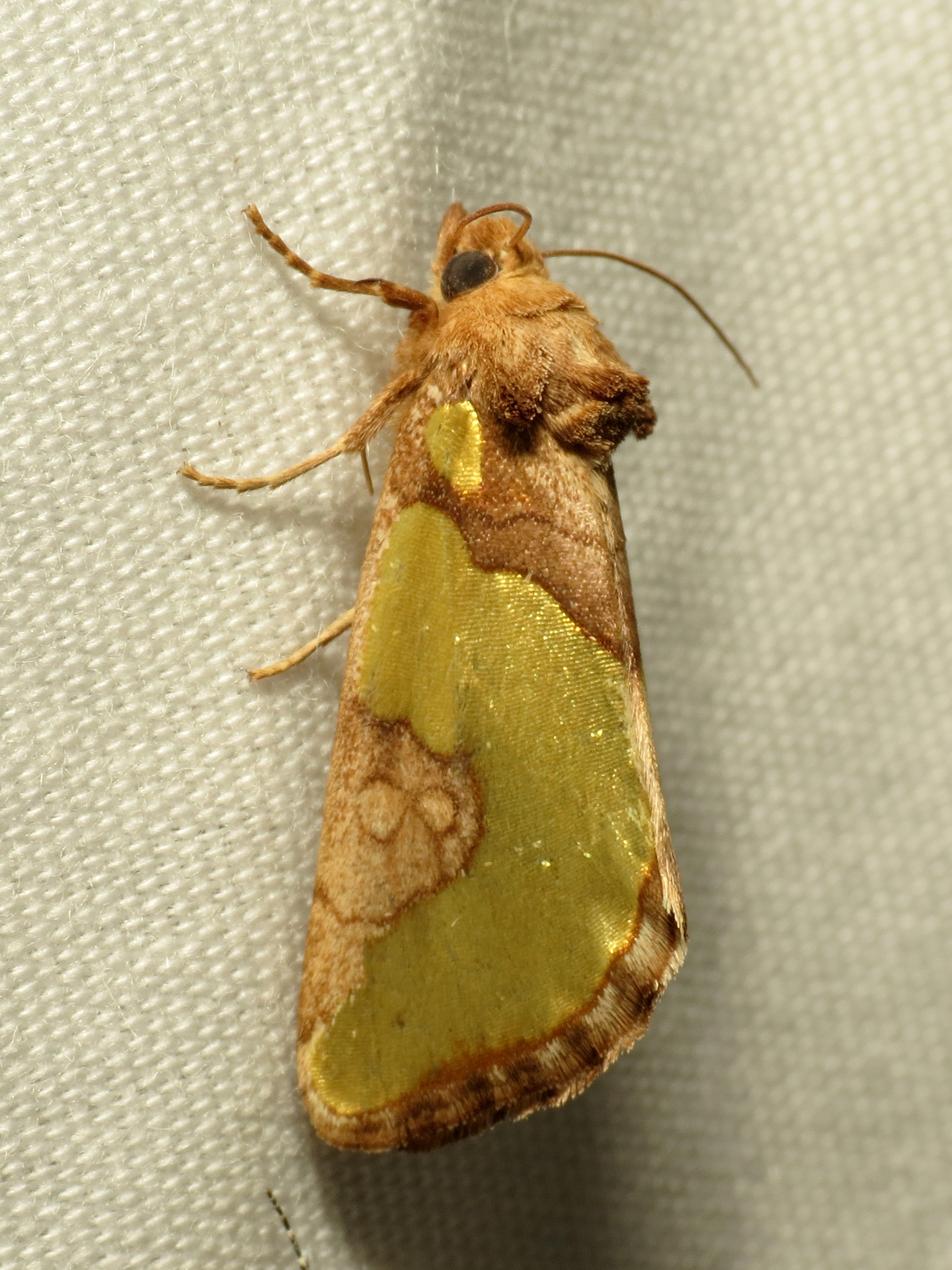

Scientific classification
- Domain: Eukaryota
- Kingdom: Animalia
- Phylum: Arthropoda
- Class: Insecta
- Order: Lepidoptera
- Superfamily: Noctuoidea
- Family: Noctuidae
- Subfamily: Stiriinae
- Tribe: Stiriini
- Genus: Chalcopasta
- Species: C. howardi

Binomial name
- Chalcopasta howardi (H. Edwards, 1877)

= Chalcopasta howardi =

Species of moth

Chalcopasta howardi is a moth in the family Noctuidae (the owlet moths) first described by Henry Edwards in 1877. It is found in North America.

The MONA or Hodges number for Chalcopasta howardi is 9776.
