= Stiria satana =

Scientific classification
- Domain: Eukaryota
- Kingdom: Animalia
- Phylum: Arthropoda
- Class: Insecta
- Order: Lepidoptera
- Superfamily: Noctuoidea
- Family: Noctuidae
- Subfamily: Stiriinae
- Tribe: Stiriini
- Genus: Stiria
- Species: S. satana

Binomial name
- Stiria satana Poole, 1995

Species of moth

Stiria satana is a species of moth in the family Noctuidae (the owlet moths). It is found in North America.

The MONA or Hodges number for Stiria satana is 9787.1.
