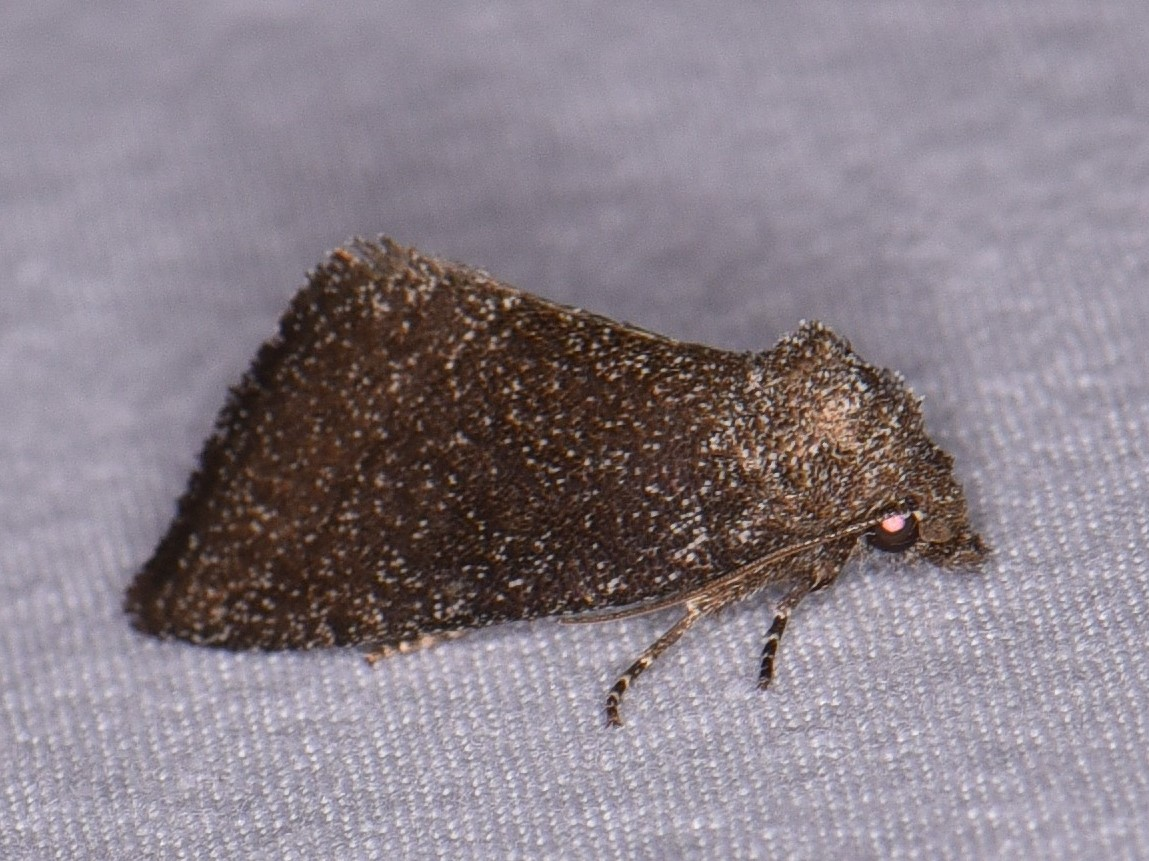

Scientific classification
- Domain: Eukaryota
- Kingdom: Animalia
- Phylum: Arthropoda
- Class: Insecta
- Order: Lepidoptera
- Superfamily: Noctuoidea
- Family: Noctuidae
- Subfamily: Stiriinae
- Tribe: Stiriini
- Genus: Plagiomimicus
- Species: P. heitzmani

Binomial name
- Plagiomimicus heitzmani Poole, 1995

= Plagiomimicus heitzmani =

Species of moth

Plagiomimicus heitzmani is a species of moth in the owlet moth family Noctuidae. It is found in North America.
