= Plagiomimicus navia =

Scientific classification
- Domain: Eukaryota
- Kingdom: Animalia
- Phylum: Arthropoda
- Class: Insecta
- Order: Lepidoptera
- Superfamily: Noctuoidea
- Family: Noctuidae
- Subfamily: Stiriinae
- Tribe: Stiriini
- Genus: Plagiomimicus
- Species: P. navia

Binomial name
- Plagiomimicus navia (Harvey, 1875)

Species of moth

Plagiomimicus navia is a species of moth in the family Noctuidae (the owlet moths).

The MONA or Hodges number for Plagiomimicus navia is 9751.
