= Chrysoecia thoracica =

Scientific classification
- Domain: Eukaryota
- Kingdom: Animalia
- Phylum: Arthropoda
- Class: Insecta
- Order: Lepidoptera
- Superfamily: Noctuoidea
- Family: Noctuidae
- Subfamily: Stiriinae
- Tribe: Stiriini
- Genus: Chrysoecia
- Species: C. thoracica

Binomial name
- Chrysoecia thoracica (H. Edwards, 1884)

Species of moth

Chrysoecia thoracica is a species of moth in the family Noctuidae (the owlet moths).

The MONA or Hodges number for Chrysoecia thoracica is 9774.
