= Annaphila abdita =

Scientific classification
- Domain: Eukaryota
- Kingdom: Animalia
- Phylum: Arthropoda
- Class: Insecta
- Order: Lepidoptera
- Superfamily: Noctuoidea
- Family: Noctuidae
- Subfamily: Stiriinae
- Tribe: Annaphilini
- Genus: Annaphila
- Species: A. abdita

Binomial name
- Annaphila abdita Rindge & Smith, 1952

Species of moth

Annaphila abdita is a species of moth in the family Noctuidae (the owlet moths). It is found in North America.

The MONA or Hodges number for Annaphila abdita is 9855.
