= Annaphila decia =

Scientific classification
- Domain: Eukaryota
- Kingdom: Animalia
- Phylum: Arthropoda
- Class: Insecta
- Order: Lepidoptera
- Superfamily: Noctuoidea
- Family: Noctuidae
- Subfamily: Stiriinae
- Tribe: Annaphilini
- Genus: Annaphila
- Species: A. decia

Binomial name
- Annaphila decia Grote, 1875

Species of moth

Annaphila decia, also called the orange flash, is a species of moth in the family Noctuidae (the owlet moths). It is found in North America.

Its wingspan is 18-21 mm. The fore wing is gray and black with a band of mottled white, and the hind wing is orange with black markings. It looks similar to Annaphila depicta. The larvae of A. decia feed on miner's lettuce.

The MONA or Hodges number for Annaphila decia is 9868.
