= Cyptonychia =

Scientific classification
- Domain: Eukaryota
- Kingdom: Animalia
- Phylum: Arthropoda
- Class: Insecta
- Order: Lepidoptera
- Superfamily: Noctuoidea
- Family: Noctuidae
- Genus: Cyptonychia; Druce, 1899

Genus of moths

Cyptonychia is a genus of moths of the family Noctuidae.

== Species ==
- Cyptonychia anaemica (Draudt, 1827)
- Cyptonychia dulcita (Schaus, 1898)
- Cyptonychia muricolor (Dyar, [1927])
- Cyptonychia pseudovarra (Dyar, [1927])
- Cyptonychia salacon (Druce, 1895)
- Cyptonychia simplicia (Dyar, [1927])
- Cyptonychia spreta (Draudt, 1927)
- Cyptonychia subfumosa (Dyar, 1909)
- Cyptonychia varrara (Dyar, 1918)

== Former species ==
- Cyptonychia thoracica is now Chrysoecia thoracica (H. Edwards, 1884)
