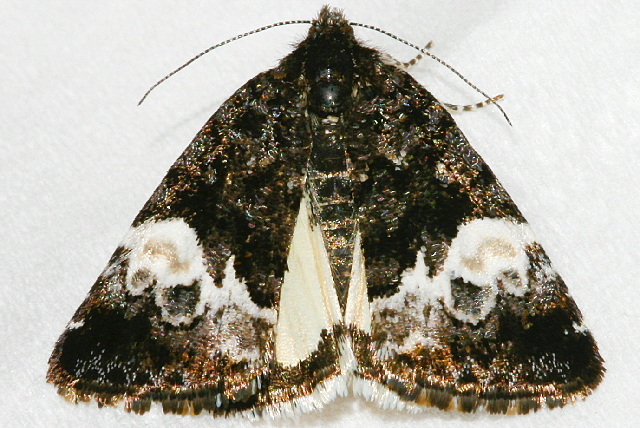

Scientific classification
- Kingdom: Animalia
- Phylum: Arthropoda
- Class: Insecta
- Order: Lepidoptera
- Superfamily: Noctuoidea
- Family: Noctuidae
- Genus: Annaphila
- Species: A. diva

Binomial name
- Annaphila diva Grote, 1873

= Annaphila diva =

Species of moth

Annaphila diva, also called the white annaphila, is a species of moth in the family Noctuidae (the owlet moths). It is found in North America. Adults' fore wings are black with white markings. Their hind wings are white bordered with black. Larvae are brown with dark bands and spots and white stripes. The host plant is miner's lettuce.

The MONA or Hodges number for Annaphila diva is 9869.
