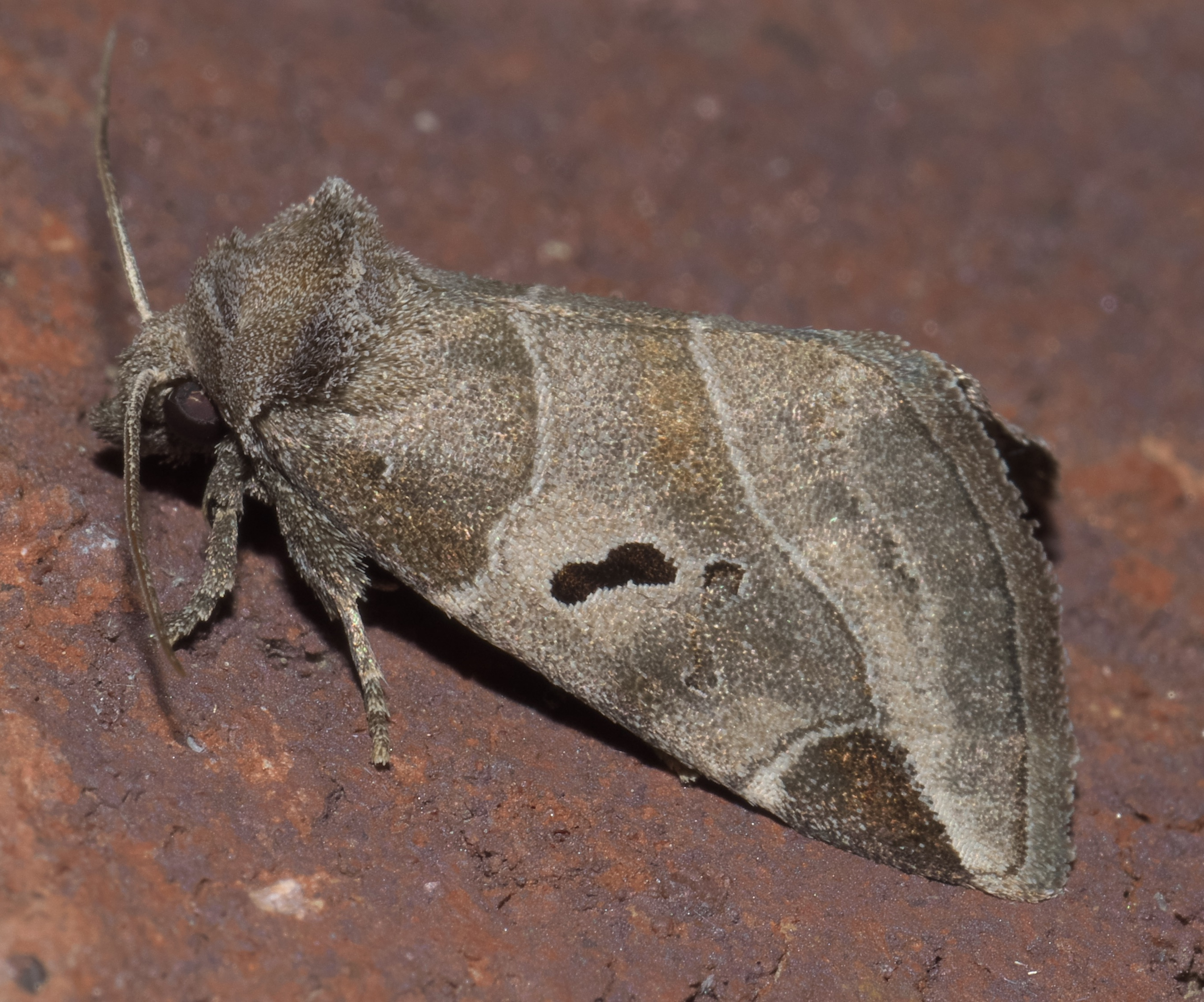
- Plagiomimicus pityochromus, black-barred brown

Scientific classification
- Kingdom: Animalia
- Phylum: Arthropoda
- Clade: Pancrustacea
- Class: Insecta
- Order: Lepidoptera
- Superfamily: Noctuoidea
- Family: Noctuidae
- Subfamily: Stiriinae
- Tribe: Stiriini
- Genus: Plagiomimicus; Grote, 1873

Synonyms
- Stibadium Grote, 1874; Polenta Morrison, 1875; Antaplaga Grote, 1877; Neophaeus Dyar, 1918

= Plagiomimicus =

Genus of moths

Plagiomimicus is a genus of moths of the family Noctuidae. The genus was erected by Augustus Radcliffe Grote in 1873.

== Species ==
- Plagiomimicus astigmatosum (Dyar, 1921)
- Plagiomimicus aureolum (H. Edwards, 1882)
- Plagiomimicus caesium (Blanchard & Knudson, 1984)
- Plagiomimicus curiosum (Neumoegen, 1884)
- Plagiomimicus dimidiata (Grote, 1877)
- Plagiomimicus expallidus Grote, 1883
- Plagiomimicus heitzmani Poole, 1995
- Plagiomimicus hilli (Barnes & Benjamin, 1923)
- Plagiomimicus kathyae Adams, 2009
- Plagiomimicus manti (Barnes, 1904)
- Plagiomimicus navia (Harvey, 1875) (alternative spelling Plagiomimicus navium)
- Plagiomimicus ochoa (Barnes, 1904)
- Plagiomimicus olvello (Barnes, 1907)
- Plagiomimicus pityochromus Grote, 1873
- Plagiomimicus pyralina (Schaus, 1904)
- Plagiomimicus spumosum (Grote, 1874) (syn: Plagiomimicus mavina (Barnes & McDunnough, 1910))
- Plagiomimicus triplagiatus J.B. Smith, 1890
- Plagiomimicus unicum (Barnes & Benjamin, 1926)
