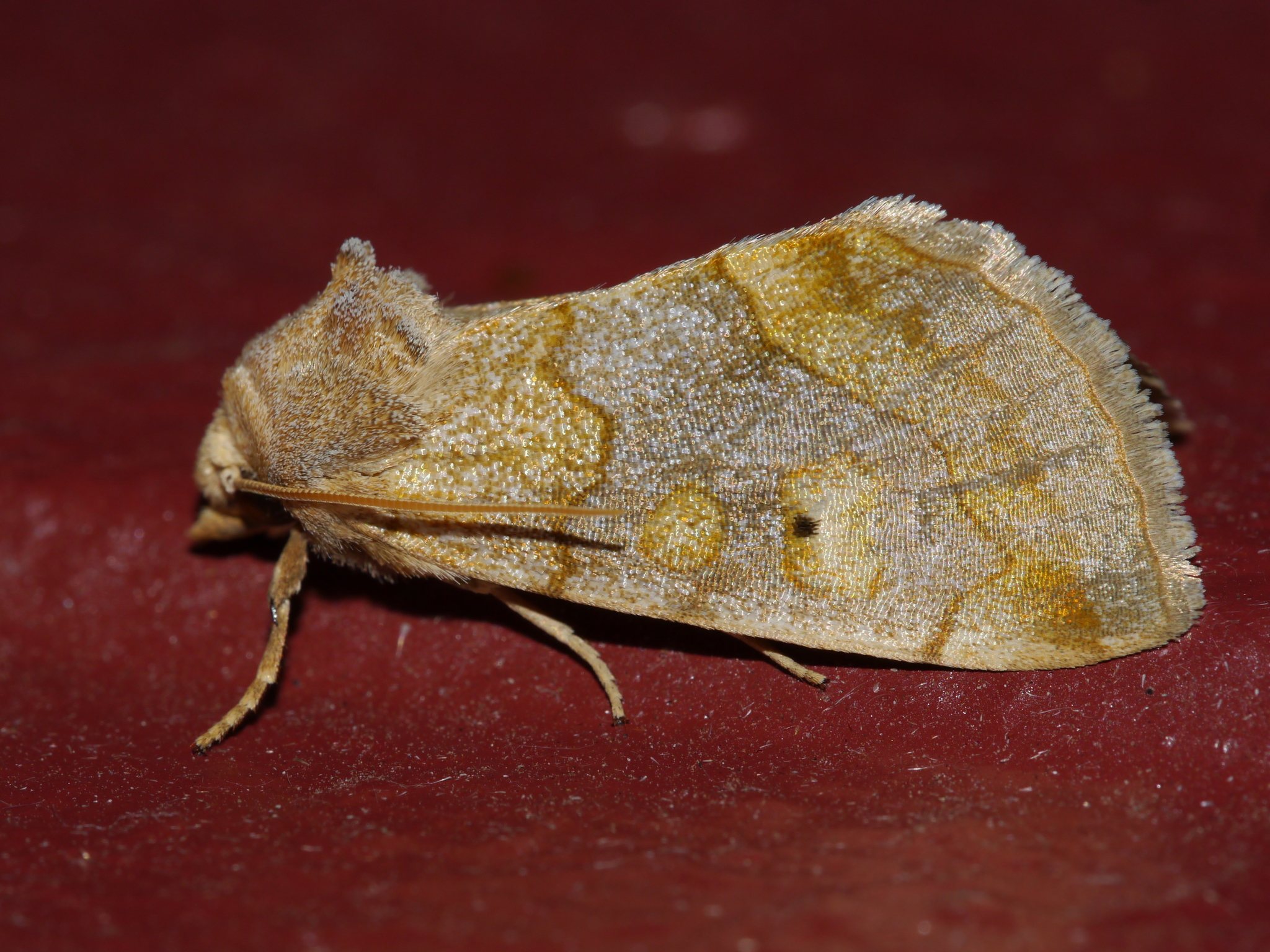
- Basilodes chrysopis, Arizona

Scientific classification
- Kingdom: Animalia
- Phylum: Arthropoda
- Class: Insecta
- Order: Lepidoptera
- Superfamily: Noctuoidea
- Family: Noctuidae
- Subfamily: Stiriinae
- Tribe: Stiriini
- Genus: Basilodes; Guenée, 1852

Synonyms
- Deobriga Walker, 1869

= Basilodes =

Genus of moths

Basilodes is a genus of owlet moths in the family Noctuidae. There are about six described species in Basilodes.

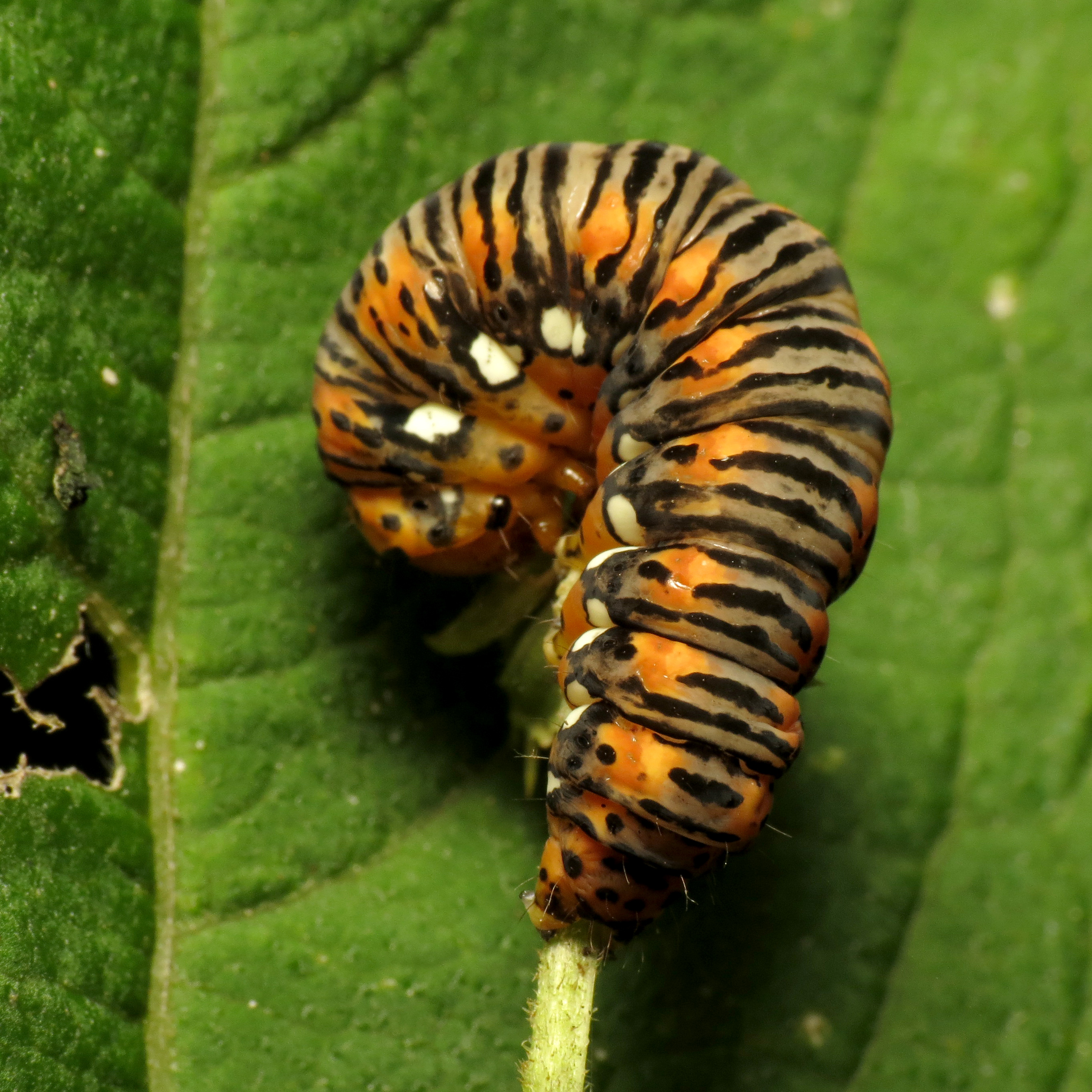
Basilodes pepita, gold moth

== Species ==
These six species belong to the genus Basilodes:

- Basilodes aurata Schaus, 1911
- Basilodes chrysopis Grote, 1881
- Basilodes inquinatus Hogue, 1963
- Basilodes pepita Guenée, 1852 (gold moth)
- Basilodes philobia Druce, 1897
- Basilodes straminea Poole, 1995
