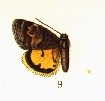

Scientific classification
- Kingdom: Animalia
- Phylum: Arthropoda
- Class: Insecta
- Order: Lepidoptera
- Superfamily: Noctuoidea
- Family: Noctuidae
- Genus: Annaphila
- Species: A. depicta

Binomial name
- Annaphila depicta Grote, 1873

= Annaphila depicta =

Species of moth

Annaphila depicta, also called the rusty-barred annaphila, is a species of moth in the family Noctuidae (the owlet moths). It is found in North America. The wingspan is 21-24 mm. Its forewing is gray with a reddish-brown band. The hindwing is orange with black markings. It looks similar to Annaphila decia, but A. decia has more black markings on its hindwings than A. depicta. A. depicta's larvae are green and feed on Nemophila menziesii.

The MONA or Hodges number for Annaphila depicta is 9866.

== Subspecies ==
These two subspecies belong to the species Annaphila depicta:

- Annaphila depicta depicta
- Annaphila depicta morula Rindge & Smith, 1952
