= Plagiomimicus olvello =

Scientific classification
- Domain: Eukaryota
- Kingdom: Animalia
- Phylum: Arthropoda
- Class: Insecta
- Order: Lepidoptera
- Superfamily: Noctuoidea
- Family: Noctuidae
- Genus: Plagiomimicus
- Species: P. olvello

Binomial name
- Plagiomimicus olvello Barnes, 1907

Species of moth

Plagiomimicus olvello is a species of moth in the family Noctuidae (the owlet moths). It was first described by William Barnes in 1907 and it is found in North America.

The MONA or Hodges number for Plagiomimicus olvello is 9742.
