= Chrysoecia =

Scientific classification
- Kingdom: Animalia
- Phylum: Arthropoda
- Class: Insecta
- Order: Lepidoptera
- Superfamily: Noctuoidea
- Family: Noctuidae
- Subfamily: Stiriinae
- Tribe: Stiriini
- Genus: Chrysoecia; Hampson, 1908

Genus of moths

Chrysoecia is a genus of owlet moths in the family Noctuidae. There are about eight described species in Chrysoecia.

== Species ==
These eight species belong to the genus Chrysoecia:

- Chrysoecia atrolinea (Barnes & McDunnough, 1912)
- Chrysoecia dela
- Chrysoecia gladiola (Barnes, 1907)
- Chrysoecia morga
- Chrysoecia requies Dyar, 1909
- Chrysoecia salacon
- Chrysoecia scira (Druce, 1889)
- Chrysoecia thoracica (H. Edwards, 1884)
