= Plagiomimicus aureolum =

Scientific classification
- Kingdom: Animalia
- Phylum: Arthropoda
- Clade: Pancrustacea
- Class: Insecta
- Order: Lepidoptera
- Superfamily: Noctuoidea
- Family: Noctuidae
- Genus: Plagiomimicus
- Species: P. aureolum

Binomial name
- Plagiomimicus aureolum (H. Edwards, 1882)

Synonyms
- Stibadium aureolum H. Edwards, 1882

Species of moth

Plagiomimicus aureolum is a species of moth in the family Noctuidae (owlet moths). It was described by Henry Edwards in 1882 and is found in North America, where it has been recorded from Arizona, western Texas and New Mexico.

The wingspan is 25–27 mm. The anterior two-thirds of the forewings are pinkish-brown, with flecks of whitish scales. The hindwings are dull fawn colour, palest at the base, with an indistinct median line.

The MONA or Hodges number for Plagiomimicus aureolum is 9741.
