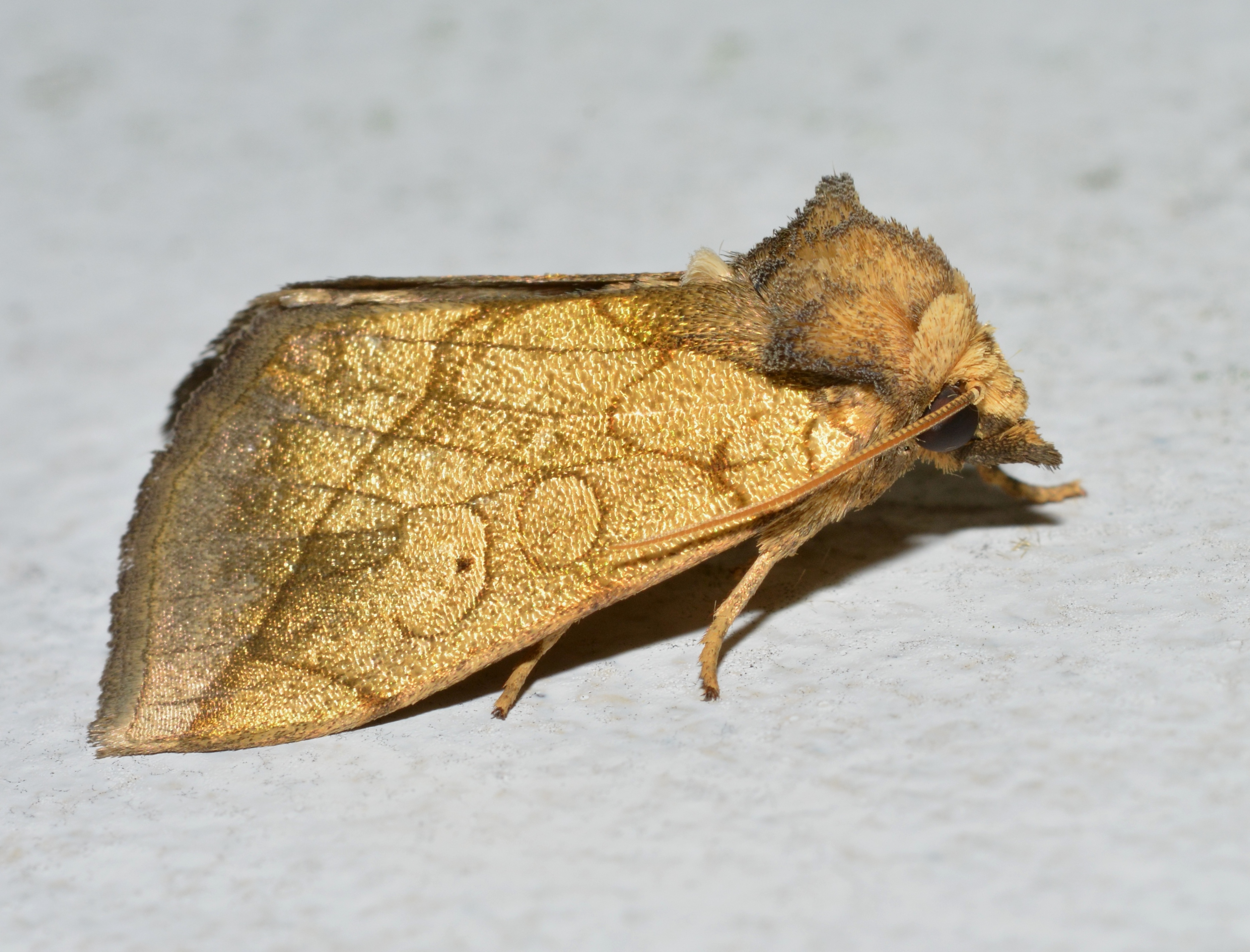

Scientific classification
- Kingdom: Animalia
- Phylum: Arthropoda
- Clade: Pancrustacea
- Class: Insecta
- Order: Lepidoptera
- Superfamily: Noctuoidea
- Family: Noctuidae
- Genus: Basilodes
- Species: B. pepita

Binomial name
- Basilodes pepita Guenée, 1852

= Basilodes pepita =

Species of moth

Basilodes pepita, the gold moth, is a species of owlet moth in the family Noctuidae. It was first described by Achille Guenée in 1852. It is found in North America. Caterpillars feed on plants from the genus Verbesina.
