= Stiria rugifrons =

Scientific classification
- Kingdom: Animalia
- Phylum: Arthropoda
- Class: Insecta
- Order: Lepidoptera
- Superfamily: Noctuoidea
- Family: Noctuidae
- Genus: Stiria
- Species: S. rugifrons

Binomial name
- Stiria rugifrons Grote, 1874

Species of moth

Stiria rugifrons, the yellow sunflower moth, is a species of moth in the family Noctuidae (the owlet moths). It is found in North America.

The MONA or Hodges number for Stiria rugifrons is 9785.
