= Stiria =

Scientific classification
- Kingdom: Animalia
- Phylum: Arthropoda
- Class: Insecta
- Order: Lepidoptera
- Superfamily: Noctuoidea
- Family: Noctuidae
- Subfamily: Stiriinae
- Tribe: Stiriini
- Genus: Stiria; Grote, 1874

Genus of moths

Stiria is a genus of moths of the family Noctuidae. The genus was erected by Augustus Radcliffe Grote in 1874.

== Species ==
- Stiria blanchardi (Hogue, 1966) western Texas, southeastern New Mexico
- Stiria colimae Draudt, 1927 Mexico
- Stiria consuela Strecker, 1900 Arizona
- Stiria dyari Hill, 1924 southern California, northern Baja California, Arizona, southern Nevada
- Stiria intermixta Dyar, 1918 Mexico, west Texas, Arizona, New Mexico, Utah, Colorado
- Stiria ischune Dyar, 1912 Mexico
- Stiria iticys Dyar, 1914 Mexico
- Stiria mouris Dyar, 1912 Mexico
- Stiria ruficeps Draudt, 1927 Mexico
- Stiria rugifrons Grote, 1874 from (Florida-Virginia)- to (Ohio, Indiana, Illinois), Saskatchewan, Alberta, Wyoming, Rocky Mountains, Colorado, Texas
- Stiria satana Poole, 1995 Arizona
- Stiria sisaya Dyar, 1912 Mexico
- Stiria sulphurea Neumoegen, 1882 western Texas, New Mexico, Arizona
- Stiria tachymora Dyar, 1914 Mexico
