= Annaphila arvalis =

Scientific classification
- Kingdom: Animalia
- Phylum: Arthropoda
- Clade: Pancrustacea
- Class: Insecta
- Order: Lepidoptera
- Superfamily: Noctuoidea
- Family: Noctuidae
- Genus: Annaphila
- Species: A. arvalis

Binomial name
- Annaphila arvalis H. Edwards, 1875

Synonyms
- Annaphila salicis H. Edwards, 1881; Brephos fletcheri Smith, 1907

Species of moth

Annaphila arvalis is a species of moth in the family Noctuidae (owlet moths). It was described by Henry Edwards in 1875 and is found in North America, where it has been recorded from foothill canyons and riparian habitats in south-eastern British Columbia, eastern Washington, north-central Oregon, south to southern California.

The wingspan is about 20 mm. Adults are on wing from early March to mid-April.

The larvae feed on Montia perfoliata.

The MONA or Hodges number for Annaphila arvalis is 9854.
