= Fota armata =

Scientific classification
- Kingdom: Animalia
- Phylum: Arthropoda
- Class: Insecta
- Order: Lepidoptera
- Superfamily: Noctuoidea
- Family: Noctuidae
- Genus: Fota
- Species: F. armata

Binomial name
- Fota armata Grote, 1882

Species of moth

Fota armata is a species of moth in the family Noctuidae (the owlet moths). It is found in North America.

The MONA or Hodges number for Fota armata is 9842.
