= Stiria intermixta =

Scientific classification
- Domain: Eukaryota
- Kingdom: Animalia
- Phylum: Arthropoda
- Class: Insecta
- Order: Lepidoptera
- Superfamily: Noctuoidea
- Family: Noctuidae
- Genus: Stiria
- Species: S. intermixta

Binomial name
- Stiria intermixta Dyar, 1918

Species of moth

Stiria intermixta is a species of moth in the family Noctuidae (the owlet moths). It is found in North America.

The MONA or Hodges number for Stiria intermixta is 9785.1.
