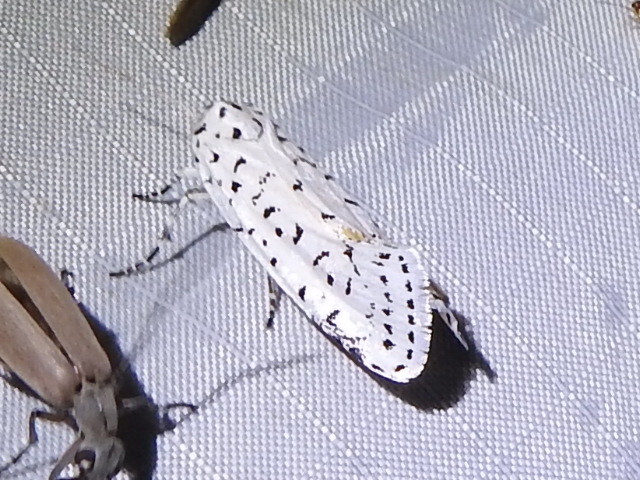
- Cerathosia tricolor, Texas

Scientific classification
- Domain: Eukaryota
- Kingdom: Animalia
- Phylum: Arthropoda
- Class: Insecta
- Order: Lepidoptera
- Superfamily: Noctuoidea
- Family: Noctuidae
- Subfamily: Stiriinae
- Tribe: Annaphilini
- Genus: Cerathosia; Smith, 1887
- Species: C. tricolor

Binomial name
- Cerathosia tricolor Smith, 1887

= Cerathosia =

Genus of moths

Cerathosia is a genus of moths of the family Noctuidae.

== Species ==
- Cerathosia opistochra Dyar, 1916
- Cerathosia tricolor Smith, 1887
