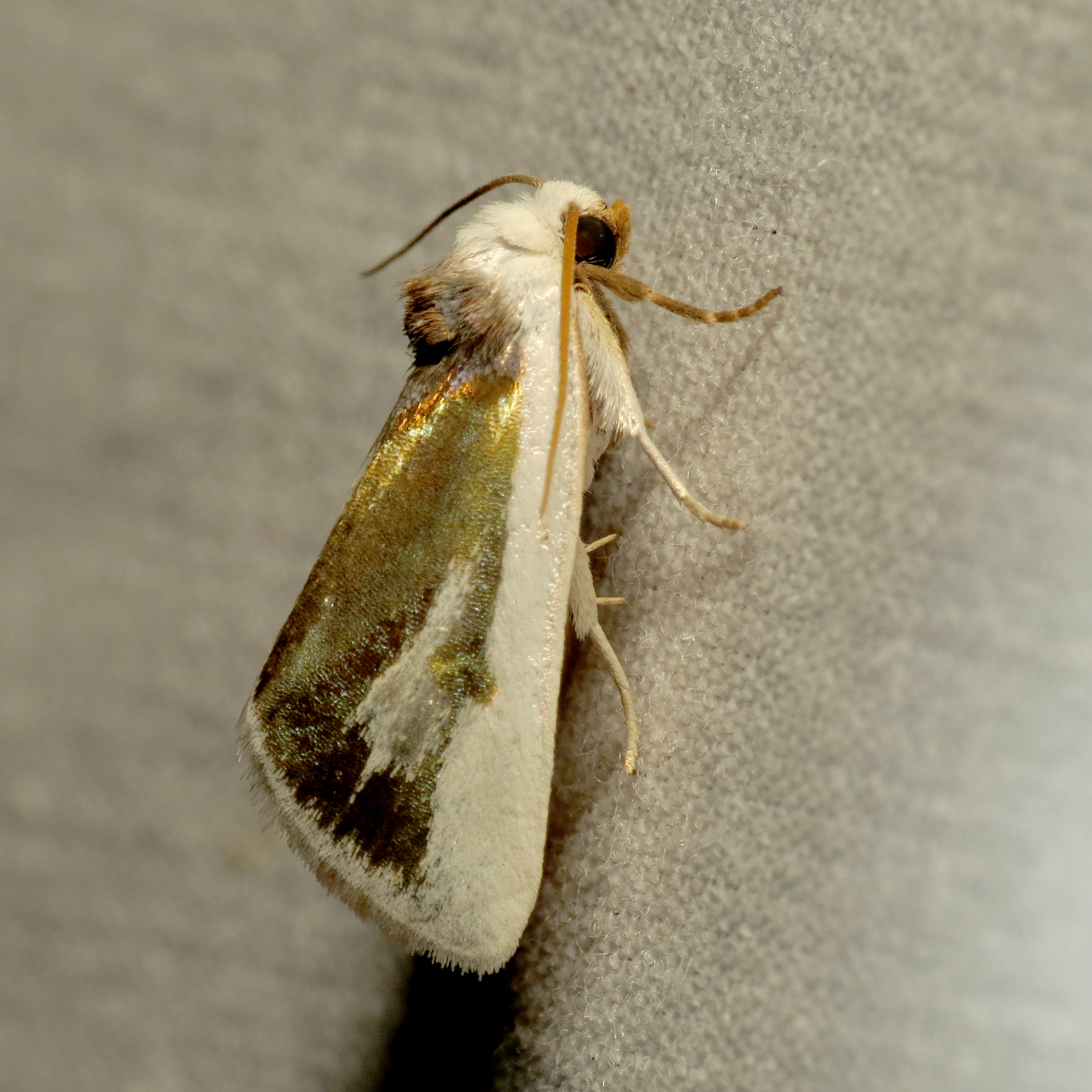

Scientific classification
- Kingdom: Animalia
- Phylum: Arthropoda
- Class: Insecta
- Order: Lepidoptera
- Superfamily: Noctuoidea
- Family: Noctuidae
- Genus: Neumoegenia
- Species: N. poetica

Binomial name
- Neumoegenia poetica Grote, 1882

= Neumoegenia poetica =

Species of moth

Neumoegenia poetica, the poetry moth, is a species of moth in the family Noctuidae (the owlet moths). It is found in North America.

The MONA or Hodges number for Neumoegenia poetica is 9737.
