= Plagiomimicus pyralina =

Scientific classification
- Kingdom: Animalia
- Phylum: Arthropoda
- Clade: Pancrustacea
- Class: Insecta
- Order: Lepidoptera
- Superfamily: Noctuoidea
- Family: Noctuidae
- Genus: Plagiomimicus
- Species: P. pyralina

Binomial name
- Plagiomimicus pyralina (Schaus, 1904)

Species of moth

Plagiomimicus pyralina is a moth in the family Noctuidae described by William Schaus in 1904. It is found in North America.

The MONA or Hodges number for Plagiomimicus pyralina is 9752.1.
