= Plagiomimicus expallidus =

Scientific classification
- Kingdom: Animalia
- Phylum: Arthropoda
- Class: Insecta
- Order: Lepidoptera
- Superfamily: Noctuoidea
- Family: Noctuidae
- Genus: Plagiomimicus
- Species: P. expallidus

Binomial name
- Plagiomimicus expallidus Grote, 1883

Species of moth

Plagiomimicus expallidus is a species of moth in the family Noctuidae (the owlet moths). It is found in North America.

The MONA or Hodges number for Plagiomimicus expallidus is 9752.
