= Cuahtemoca =

Scientific classification
- Domain: Eukaryota
- Kingdom: Animalia
- Phylum: Arthropoda
- Class: Insecta
- Order: Lepidoptera
- Superfamily: Noctuoidea
- Family: Noctuidae
- Subfamily: Stiriinae
- Tribe: Stiriini
- Genus: Cuahtemoca; Hogue, 1963

Genus of moths

Cuahtemoca is a genus of moths of the family Noctuidae. the genus was erected by Robert W. Poole in 1995.

== Species ==
- Cuahtemoca unicum (Barnes & Benjamin, 1926) Arizona
- Cuahtemoca chalcocraspedon (Dyar, 1913) Mexico
