= Plagiomimicus dimidiata =

Scientific classification
- Domain: Eukaryota
- Kingdom: Animalia
- Phylum: Arthropoda
- Class: Insecta
- Order: Lepidoptera
- Superfamily: Noctuoidea
- Family: Noctuidae
- Genus: Plagiomimicus
- Species: P. dimidiata

Binomial name
- Plagiomimicus dimidiata Grote, 1877

Species of moth

Plagiomimicus dimidiata is a species of moth in the family Noctuidae (the owlet moths). It is found in North America.

The MONA or Hodges number for Plagiomimicus dimidiata is 9745.
