= Annaphila danistica =

Scientific classification
- Kingdom: Animalia
- Phylum: Arthropoda
- Class: Insecta
- Order: Lepidoptera
- Superfamily: Noctuoidea
- Family: Noctuidae
- Genus: Annaphila
- Species: A. danistica

Binomial name
- Annaphila danistica Grote, 1873

Species of moth

Annaphila danistica is a species of moth in the family Noctuidae (the owlet moths). It is found in North America.

The MONA or Hodges number for Annaphila danistica is 9850.
