= Fota (moth) =

Scientific classification
- Domain: Eukaryota
- Kingdom: Animalia
- Phylum: Arthropoda
- Class: Insecta
- Order: Lepidoptera
- Superfamily: Noctuoidea
- Family: Noctuidae
- Subfamily: Stiriinae
- Genus: Fota; Grote, 1882

Genus of moths

Fota is a genus of moths of the family Noctuidae. The genus was erected by Augustus Radcliffe Grote in 1882.

== Species ==
- Fota armata Grote, 1882
- Fota minorata Grote, 1882
