= Chrysoecia atrolinea =

Scientific classification
- Domain: Eukaryota
- Kingdom: Animalia
- Phylum: Arthropoda
- Class: Insecta
- Order: Lepidoptera
- Superfamily: Noctuoidea
- Family: Noctuidae
- Genus: Chrysoecia
- Species: C. atrolinea

Binomial name
- Chrysoecia atrolinea (Barnes & McDunnough, 1912)

Species of moth

Chrysoecia atrolinea is a species of moth in the family Noctuidae (the owlet moths). It was first described by William Barnes and James Halliday McDunnough in 1912 and it is found in North America.

The MONA or Hodges number for Chrysoecia atrolinea is 9764.
