= Annaphila casta =

Scientific classification
- Domain: Eukaryota
- Kingdom: Animalia
- Phylum: Arthropoda
- Class: Insecta
- Order: Lepidoptera
- Superfamily: Noctuoidea
- Family: Noctuidae
- Genus: Annaphila
- Species: A. casta

Binomial name
- Annaphila casta H. Edwards, 1890

Species of moth

Annaphila casta is a species of moth in the family Noctuidae (the owlet moths). It is found in North America.

The MONA or Hodges number for Annaphila casta is 9865.
