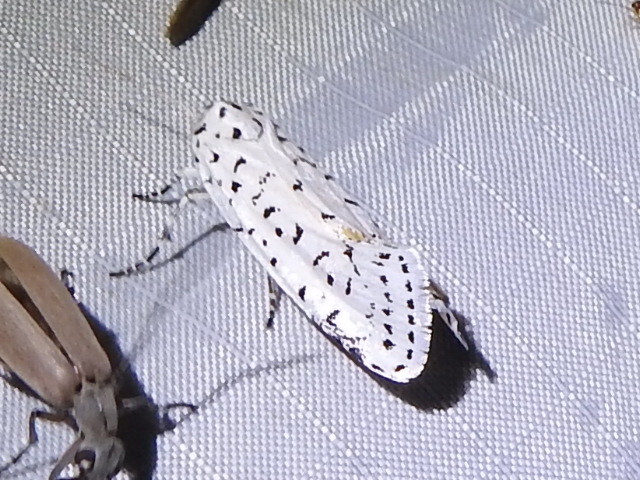

Scientific classification
- Domain: Eukaryota
- Kingdom: Animalia
- Phylum: Arthropoda
- Class: Insecta
- Order: Lepidoptera
- Superfamily: Noctuoidea
- Family: Noctuidae
- Genus: Cerathosia
- Species: C. tricolor

Binomial name
- Cerathosia tricolor Smith, 1887

= Cerathosia tricolor =

Species of moth

Cerathosia tricolor is a species of moth in the family Noctuidae (the owlet moths). It is found in North America.

The MONA or Hodges number for Cerathosia tricolor is 9064.
