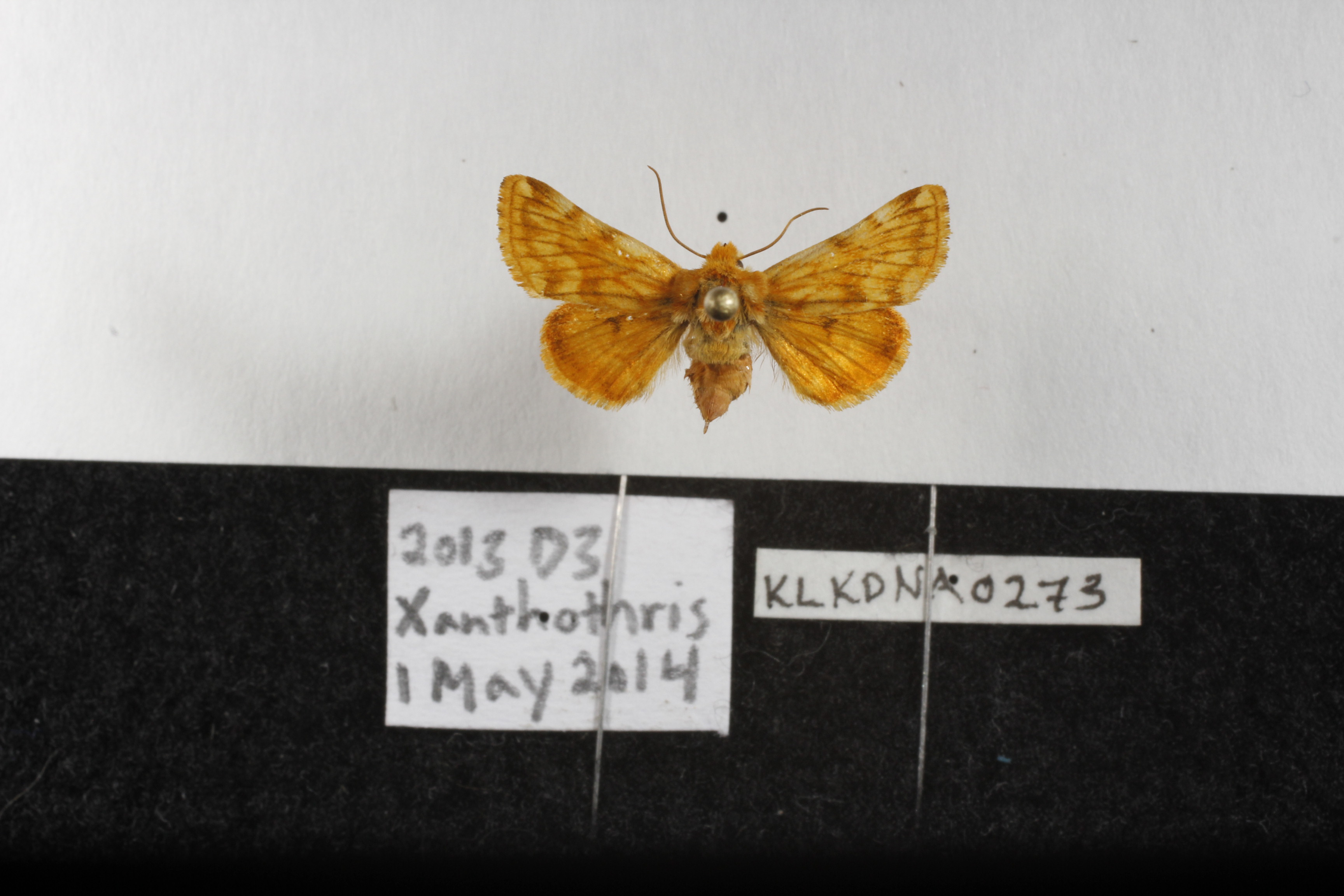
- Xanthothrix neumoegeni

Scientific classification
- Kingdom: Animalia
- Phylum: Arthropoda
- Class: Insecta
- Order: Lepidoptera
- Superfamily: Noctuoidea
- Family: Noctuidae
- Subfamily: Stiriinae
- Tribe: Stiriini
- Genus: Xanthothrix; H. Edwards, 1878

Synonyms
- Euedwardsia Grote, 1882

= Xanthothrix =

Genus of moths

Xanthothrix is a genus of moths of the family Noctuidae. The genus was erected by Henry Edwards in 1878.

== Species ==
- Xanthothrix callicore (Staudinger, 1871) Turkey, Syria
- Xanthothrix neumoegeni H. Edwards, 1881 California
- Xanthothrix ranunculi H. Edwards, 1878 California (Mojave desert)
- Xanthothrix stagmatogon Dyar, 1921 Mexico
