= Plagiomimicus manti =

Scientific classification
- Domain: Eukaryota
- Kingdom: Animalia
- Phylum: Arthropoda
- Class: Insecta
- Order: Lepidoptera
- Superfamily: Noctuoidea
- Family: Noctuidae
- Genus: Plagiomimicus
- Species: P. manti

Binomial name
- Plagiomimicus manti (Barnes, 1904)

Species of moth

Plagiomimicus manti is a species of moth in the family Noctuidae (the owlet moths). It was first described by William Barnes in 1904 and it is found in North America.

The MONA or Hodges number for Plagiomimicus manti is 9744.
