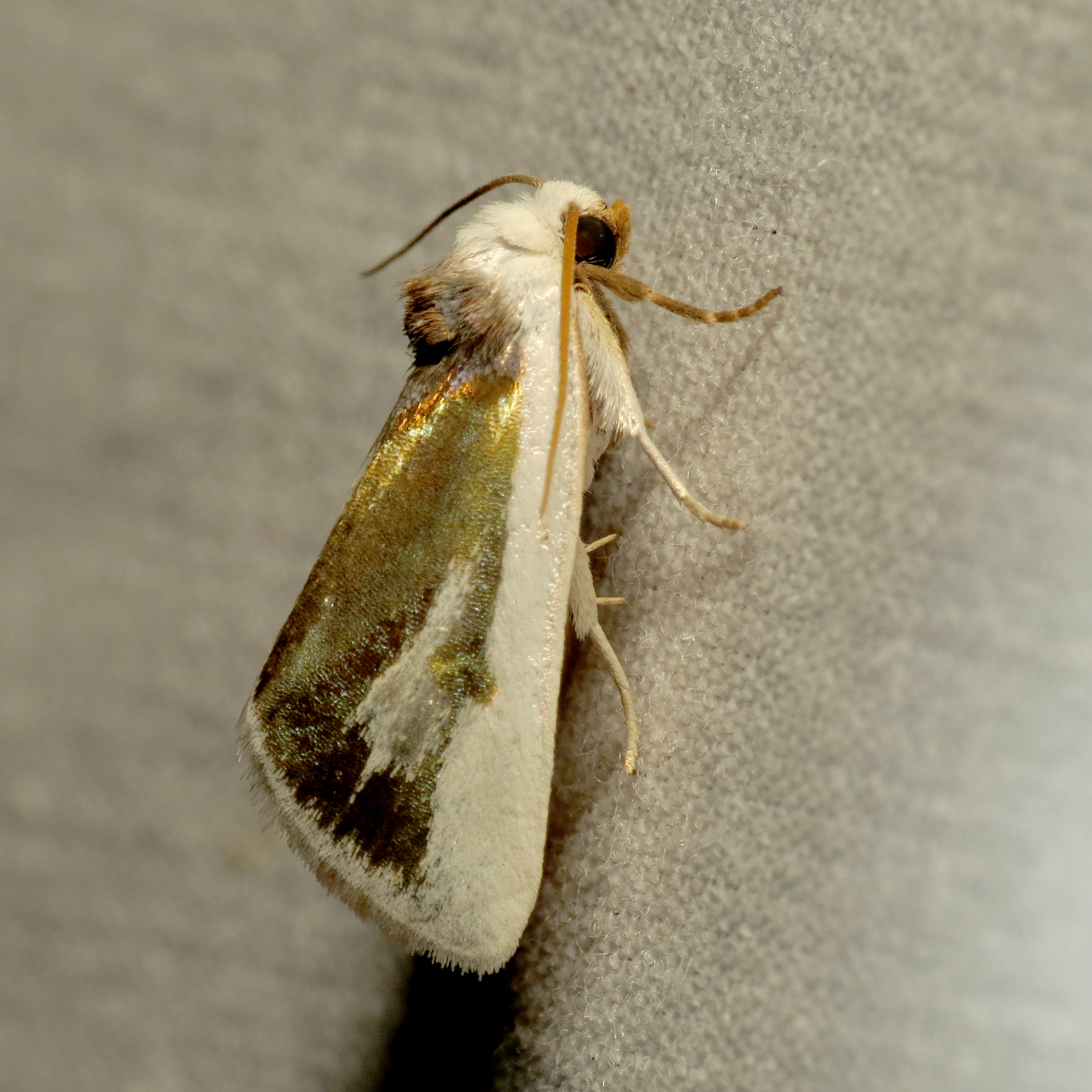
- Neumoegenia poetica, poetry moth

Scientific classification
- Kingdom: Animalia
- Phylum: Arthropoda
- Class: Insecta
- Order: Lepidoptera
- Superfamily: Noctuoidea
- Family: Noctuidae
- Subfamily: Stiriinae
- Tribe: Stiriini
- Genus: Neumoegenia; Grote, 1882

Synonyms
- Kallitrichia Ottolengui, 1898; Trichocala Dyar, [1903]

= Neumoegenia =

Genus of moths

Neumoegenia is a genus of moths of the family Noctuidae. The genus was erected by Augustus Radcliffe Grote in 1882.

== Species ==
- Neumoegenia poetica Grote, 1882 Arizona, Mexico
- Neumoegenia smithi (H. Druce, 1889) Mexico
- Neumoegenia bellamusa Dyar, 1923 Mexico
- Neumoegenia albavena (Ottolengui, 1898) Mexico
- Neumoegenia coronides (H. Druce, 1889) Mexico
