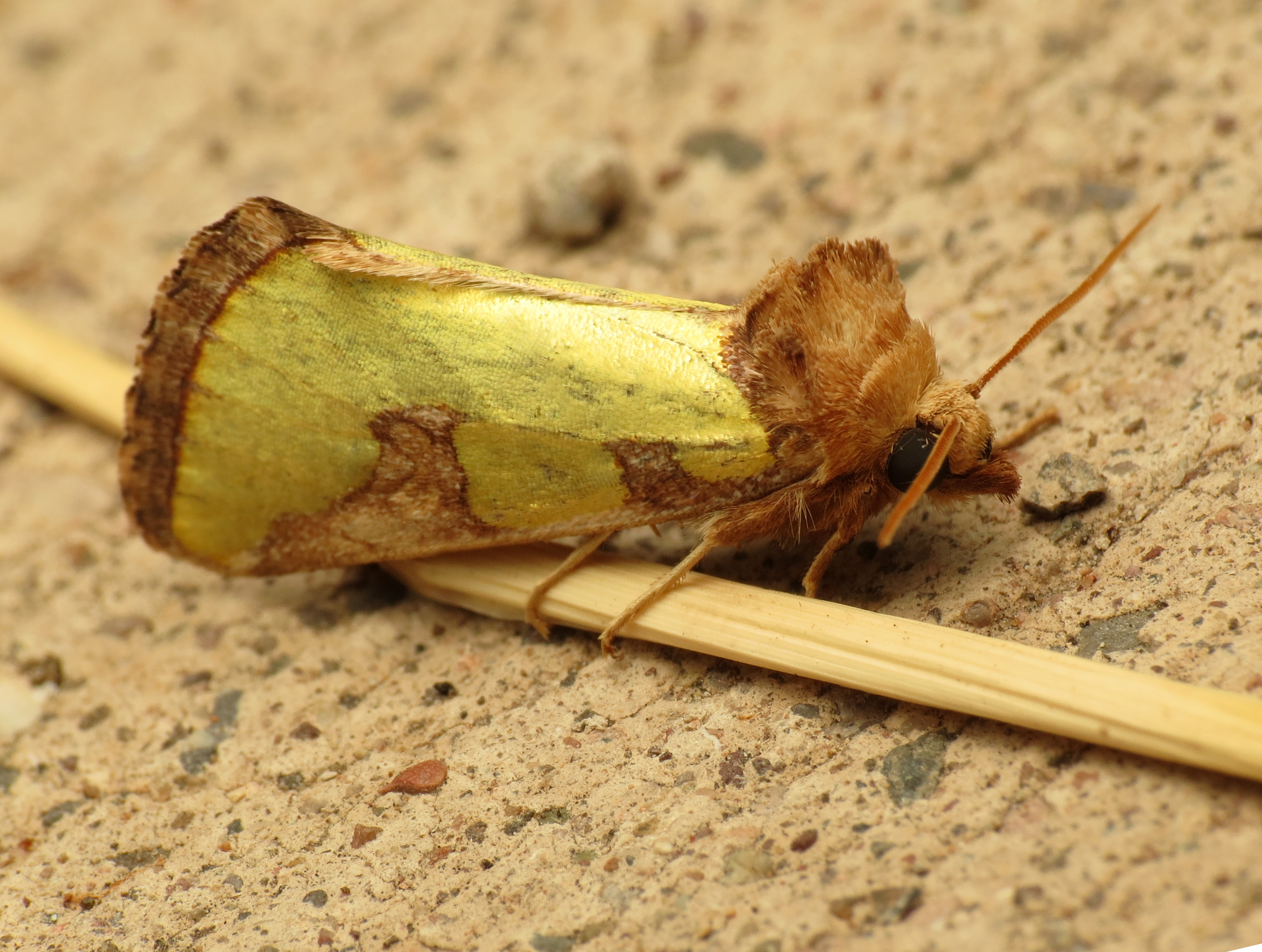
- Chalcopasta territans

Scientific classification
- Kingdom: Animalia
- Phylum: Arthropoda
- Class: Insecta
- Order: Lepidoptera
- Superfamily: Noctuoidea
- Family: Noctuidae
- Subfamily: Stiriinae
- Tribe: Stiriini
- Genus: Chalcopasta; Hampson, 1908

= Chalcopasta =

Genus of moths

Chalcopasta is a genus of owlet moths in the family Noctuidae. There are about nine described species in Chalcopasta.

== Species ==
These nine species belong to the genus Chalcopasta:

- Chalcopasta acantha Druce, 1889
- Chalcopasta acema (Druce, 1889)
- Chalcopasta ellica Dyar, 1915
- Chalcopasta fulgens Barnes & McDunnough, 1912
- Chalcopasta howardi (H. Edwards, 1877)
- Chalcopasta pterochalcea Dyar, 1909
- Chalcopasta riandana Dyar, 1912
- Chalcopasta sinuata Hampson, 1918
- Chalcopasta territans (H. Edwards, 1884)

== Former species ==
- Chalcopasta koebelei is now Argentostiria koebelei (Riley, 1893)
