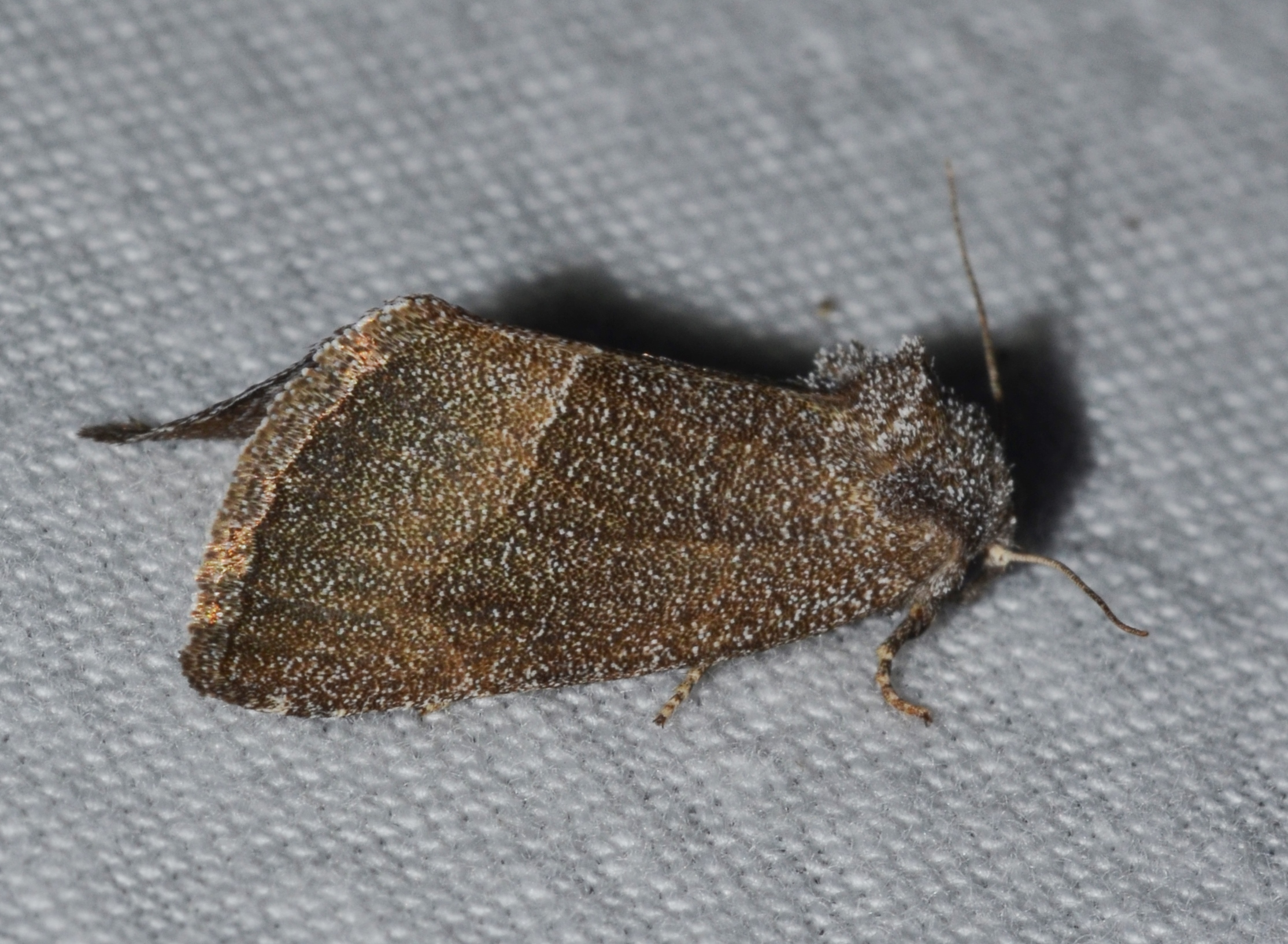

Scientific classification
- Kingdom: Animalia
- Phylum: Arthropoda
- Clade: Pancrustacea
- Class: Insecta
- Order: Lepidoptera
- Superfamily: Noctuoidea
- Family: Noctuidae
- Genus: Plagiomimicus
- Species: P. spumosum

Binomial name
- Plagiomimicus spumosum (Grote, 1874)

Synonyms
- Stibadium spumosum Grote, 1873; Stibadium mavina Barnes & McDunnough, 1910; Plagiomimicus mavina

= Plagiomimicus spumosum =

Species of moth

Plagiomimicus spumosum, the frothy moth, is a moth of the family Noctuidae. The species was first described by Augustus Radcliffe Grote in 1874. Plagiomimicus spumosum is a North American species of moth; they are prevalent throughout the continental United States, and can be found as far north in Canada as southern Ontario and southern Alberta.

The wingspan of the frothy moth is 33–40 mm. Adults are on wing in mid-summer in one generation per year.

Their larvae feed on Helianthus annuus, burrowing into the head of the host plant to feed on the seeds.
