= Annaphila astrologa =

Scientific classification
- Domain: Eukaryota
- Kingdom: Animalia
- Phylum: Arthropoda
- Class: Insecta
- Order: Lepidoptera
- Superfamily: Noctuoidea
- Family: Noctuidae
- Genus: Annaphila
- Species: A. astrologa

Binomial name
- Annaphila astrologa Barnes & McDunnough, 1918

Species of moth

Annaphila astrologa is a moth in the family Noctuidae (the owlet moths) first described by William Barnes and James Halliday McDunnough in 1918. It is found in North America.

The MONA or Hodges number for Annaphila astrologa is 9857.
