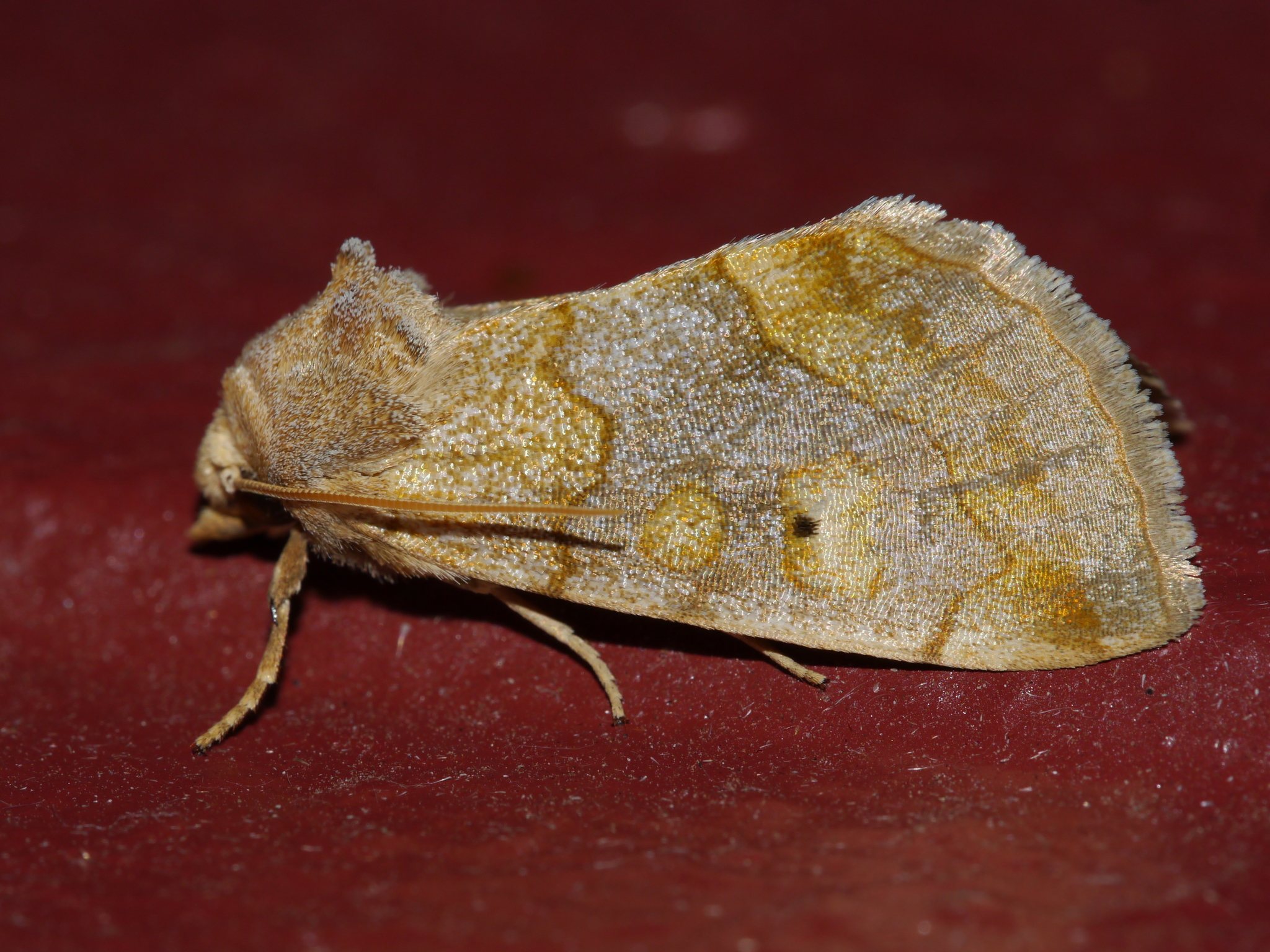

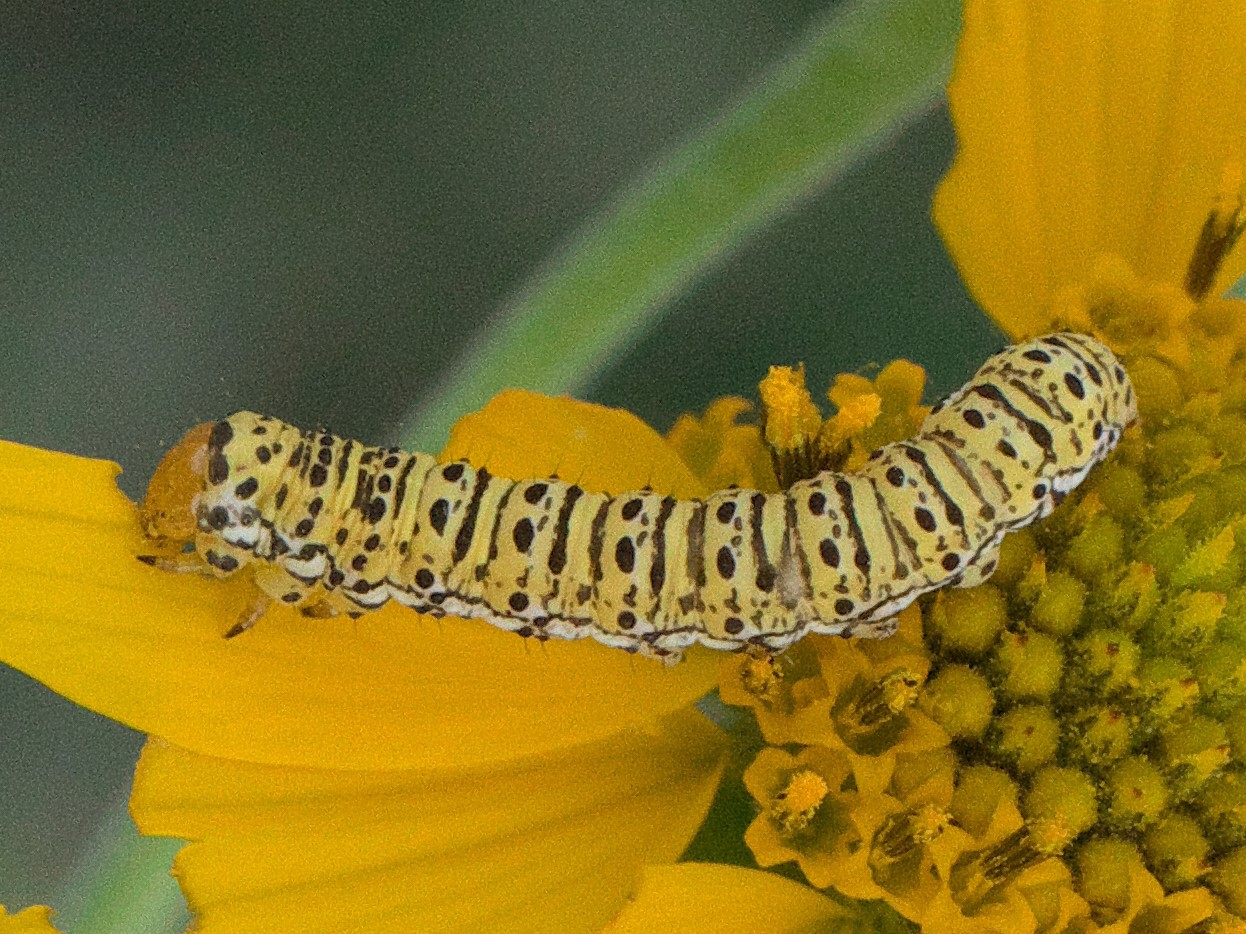
- Adult (top) and larva (bottom)

Scientific classification
- Kingdom: Animalia
- Phylum: Arthropoda
- Class: Insecta
- Order: Lepidoptera
- Superfamily: Noctuoidea
- Family: Noctuidae
- Genus: Basilodes
- Species: B. chrysopis

Binomial name
- Basilodes chrysopis Grote, 1881

= Basilodes chrysopis =

Species of moth

Basilodes chrysopis is a species of moth in the owlet moth family Noctuidae. It was first described by Augustus Radcliffe Grote in 1881 and is found in North America.

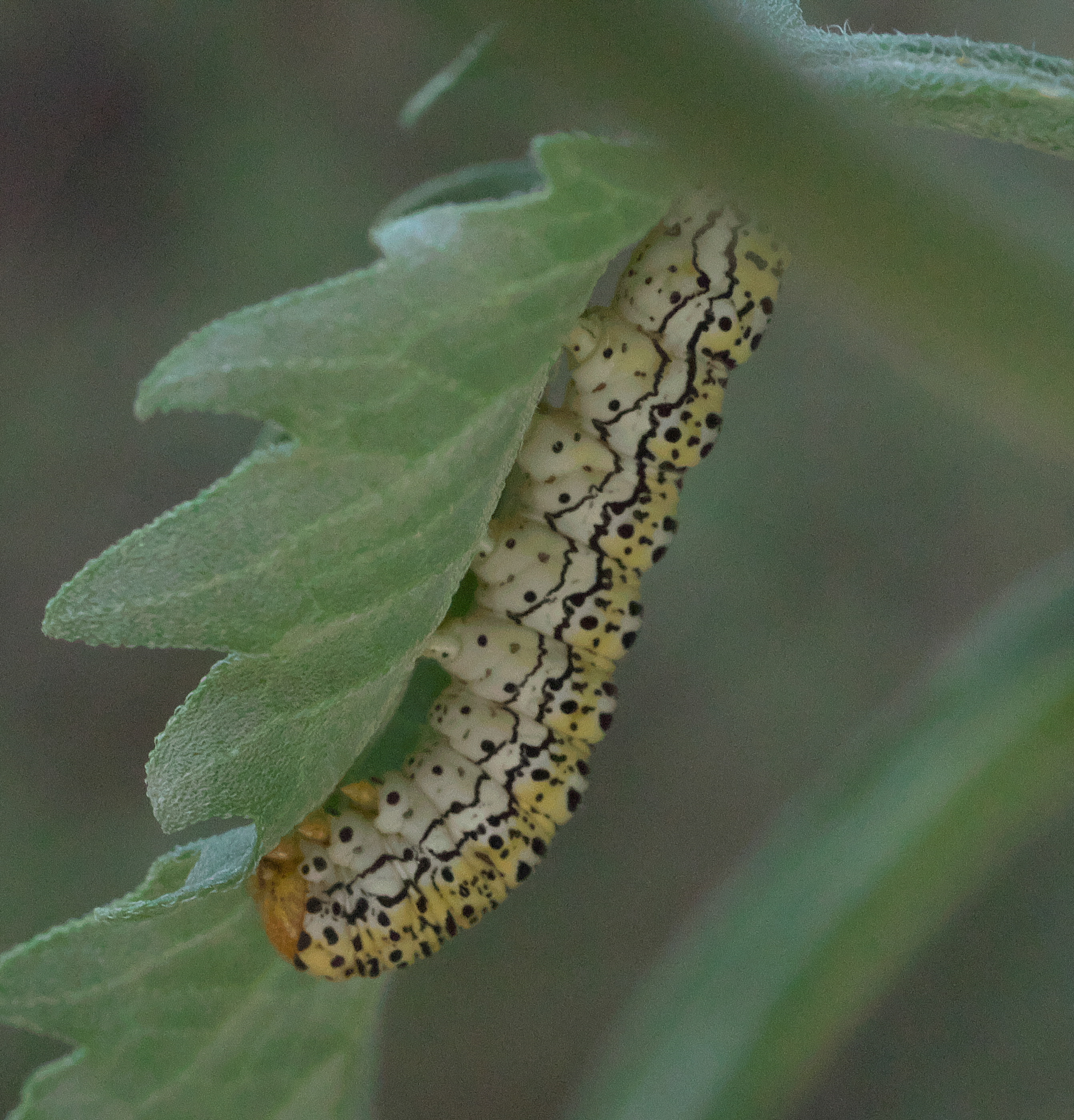
