= Fala ptycophora =

Scientific classification
- Kingdom: Animalia
- Phylum: Arthropoda
- Class: Insecta
- Order: Lepidoptera
- Superfamily: Noctuoidea
- Family: Noctuidae
- Subfamily: Stiriinae
- Genus: Fala; Grote, 1875
- Species: F. ptychophora

Binomial name
- Fala ptychophora Grote, 1875

Species of moth

Fala is a monotypic moth genus of the family Noctuidae. Its only species, Fala ptycophora, is found in the US state of California. Both the genus and species were first described by Augustus Radcliffe Grote in 1875.
