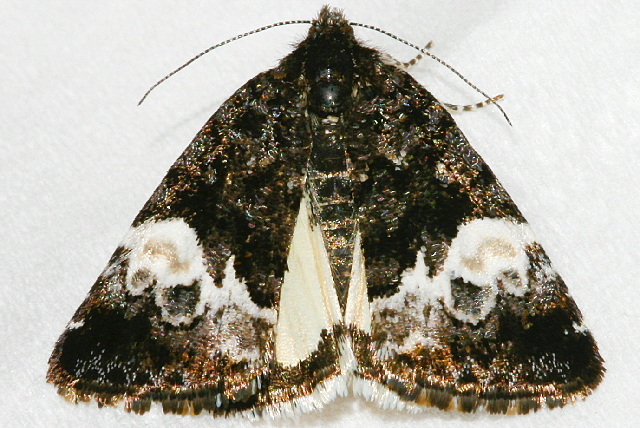

Scientific classification
- Kingdom: Animalia
- Phylum: Arthropoda
- Class: Insecta
- Order: Lepidoptera
- Superfamily: Noctuoidea
- Family: Noctuidae
- Subfamily: Stiriinae
- Tribe: Annaphilini
- Genus: Annaphila; Grote, 1873

Synonyms
- Proannaphila Rindge & Smith, 1952

= Annaphila =

Genus of moths

Annaphila is a genus of moths of the family Noctuidae. The genus was erected by Augustus Radcliffe Grote in 1873.

== Species ==
- Annaphila abdita Rindge & Smith, 1952
- Annaphila arvalis H. Edwards, 1875
- Annaphila astrologa Barnes & McDunnough, 1918
- Annaphila baueri Rindge & Smith, 1952
- Annaphila casta H. Edwards, 1890
- Annaphila danistica Grote, 1873
- Annaphila decia Grote, 1875
- Annaphila depicta Grote, 1873
- Annaphila diva Grote, 1873
- Annaphila divinula Grote, 1878
- Annaphila evansi Rindge & Smith, 1952
- Annaphila hennei Rindge & Smith, 1952
- Annaphila ida Rindge & Smith, 1952
- Annaphila lithosina H. Edwards, 1875
- Annaphila macfarlandi Buckett & Bauer, 1964
- Annaphila mera Harvey, 1875
- Annaphila miona Smith, 1908
- Annaphila olgae Sala, [1964]
- Annaphila pseudoastrologa Sala, [1964]
- Annaphila pustulata H. Edwards, 1881
- Annaphila scurlockorum Sala & Mustelin, 2006
- Annaphila spila Rindge & Smith, 1952
- Annaphila superba H. Edwards, 1875
- Annaphila vivianae Sala, [1964]
