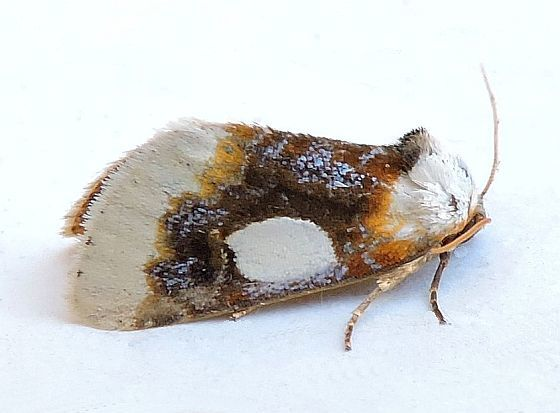

Scientific classification
- Kingdom: Animalia
- Phylum: Arthropoda
- Clade: Pancrustacea
- Class: Insecta
- Order: Lepidoptera
- Superfamily: Noctuoidea
- Family: Noctuidae
- Genus: Chrysoecia
- Species: C. gladiola

Binomial name
- Chrysoecia gladiola (Barnes, 1907)

= Chrysoecia gladiola =

Species of moth

Chrysoecia gladiola is a species of moth in the family Noctuidae (the owlet moths). It was first described by William Barnes in 1907 and it is found in North America.
