= Plagiomimicus ochoa =

Scientific classification
- Domain: Eukaryota
- Kingdom: Animalia
- Phylum: Arthropoda
- Class: Insecta
- Order: Lepidoptera
- Superfamily: Noctuoidea
- Family: Noctuidae
- Genus: Plagiomimicus
- Species: P. ochoa

Binomial name
- Plagiomimicus ochoa (Barnes, 1904)

Species of moth

Plagiomimicus ochoa is a species of moth in the family Noctuidae (the owlet moths). It was first described by William Barnes in 1904 and it is found in North America.

The MONA or Hodges number for Plagiomimicus ochoa is 9740.
