= Hoplolythrodes =

Scientific classification
- Domain: Eukaryota
- Kingdom: Animalia
- Phylum: Arthropoda
- Class: Insecta
- Order: Lepidoptera
- Superfamily: Noctuoidea
- Family: Noctuidae
- Subfamily: Stiriinae
- Tribe: Stiriini
- Genus: Hoplolythrodes; Poole, 1995
- Species: H. arivaca

Binomial name
- Hoplolythrodes arivaca (Barnes, 1907)

Genus of moths

Hoplolythrodes is a genus of moths of the family Noctuidae. The genus was erected by Robert W. Poole in 1995.

== Species ==
- Hoplolythrodes arivaca (Barnes, 1907)
- Hoplolythrodes prepontendyta (Dyar, 1914)
