= Angulostiria =

Scientific classification
- Domain: Eukaryota
- Kingdom: Animalia
- Phylum: Arthropoda
- Class: Insecta
- Order: Lepidoptera
- Superfamily: Noctuoidea
- Family: Noctuidae
- Subfamily: Stiriinae
- Tribe: Stiriini
- Genus: Angulostiria; Poole, 1995
- Species: A. chryseochilus

Binomial name
- Angulostiria chryseochilus (Dyar, 1909)

Synonyms
- Basilodes chryseochilus Dyar, 1909

Genus of moths

Angulostiria is a monotypic moth genus of the family Noctuidae erected by Robert W. Poole in 1995. Its only species, Angulostiria chryseochilus, was first described by Harrison Gray Dyar Jr. in 1909. It is found in western Texas and in Mexico.
