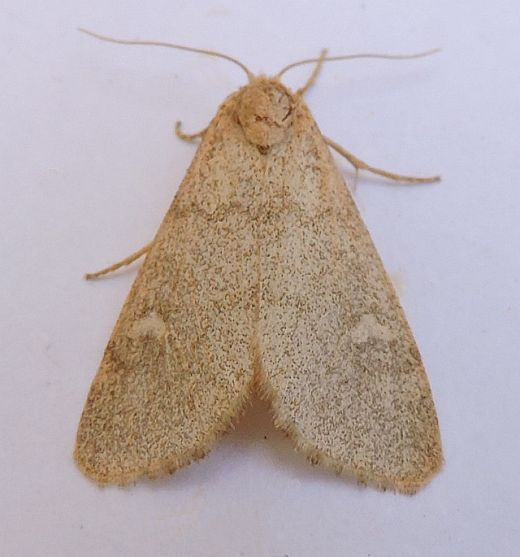
- Narthecophora pulverea, Arizona

Scientific classification
- Domain: Eukaryota
- Kingdom: Animalia
- Phylum: Arthropoda
- Class: Insecta
- Order: Lepidoptera
- Superfamily: Noctuoidea
- Family: Noctuidae
- Tribe: Stiriini
- Genus: Narthecophora; J. B. Smith, 1900
- Species: N. pulverea

Binomial name
- Narthecophora pulverea Smith, 1900

= Narthecophora =

Genus of moths

Narthecophora is a monotypic moth genus of the family Noctuidae. Its only species, Narthecophora pulverea, is found in the Sonoran Desert areas of the US state of Arizona and Mexican state of Sonora. Both the genus and species were first described by John Bernhardt Smith in 1900.

The caterpillar of Narthecophora pulverea is unknown.
