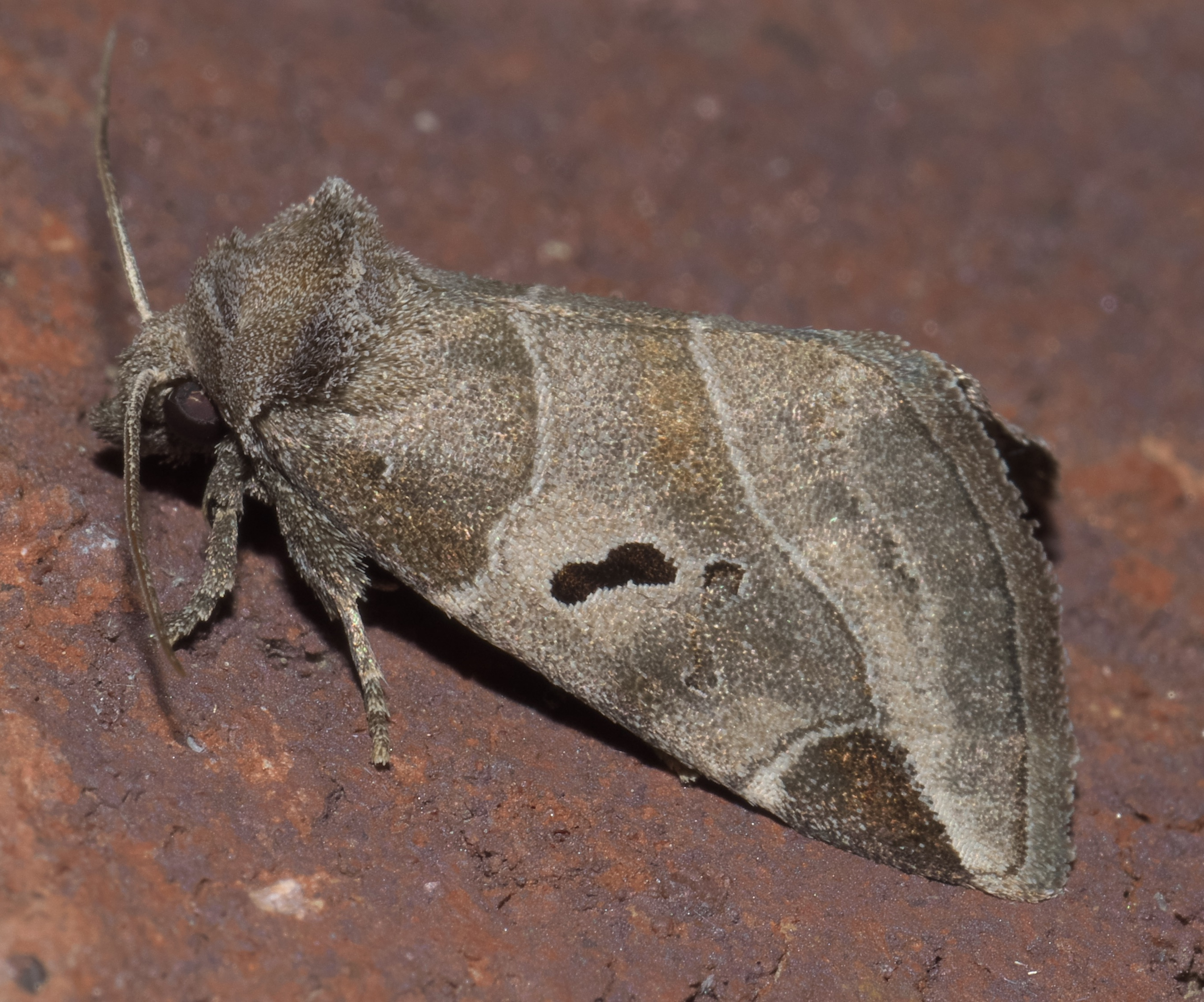

Scientific classification
- Kingdom: Animalia
- Phylum: Arthropoda
- Class: Insecta
- Order: Lepidoptera
- Superfamily: Noctuoidea
- Family: Noctuidae
- Genus: Plagiomimicus
- Species: P. pityochromus

Binomial name
- Plagiomimicus pityochromus Grote, 1873

= Plagiomimicus pityochromus =

Species of moth

Plagiomimicus pityochromus, the black-barred brown, is an owlet moth (family Noctuidae). The species was first described by Augustus Radcliffe Grote in 1873. It is found in North America.

The MONA or Hodges number for Plagiomimicus pityochromus is 9754.
