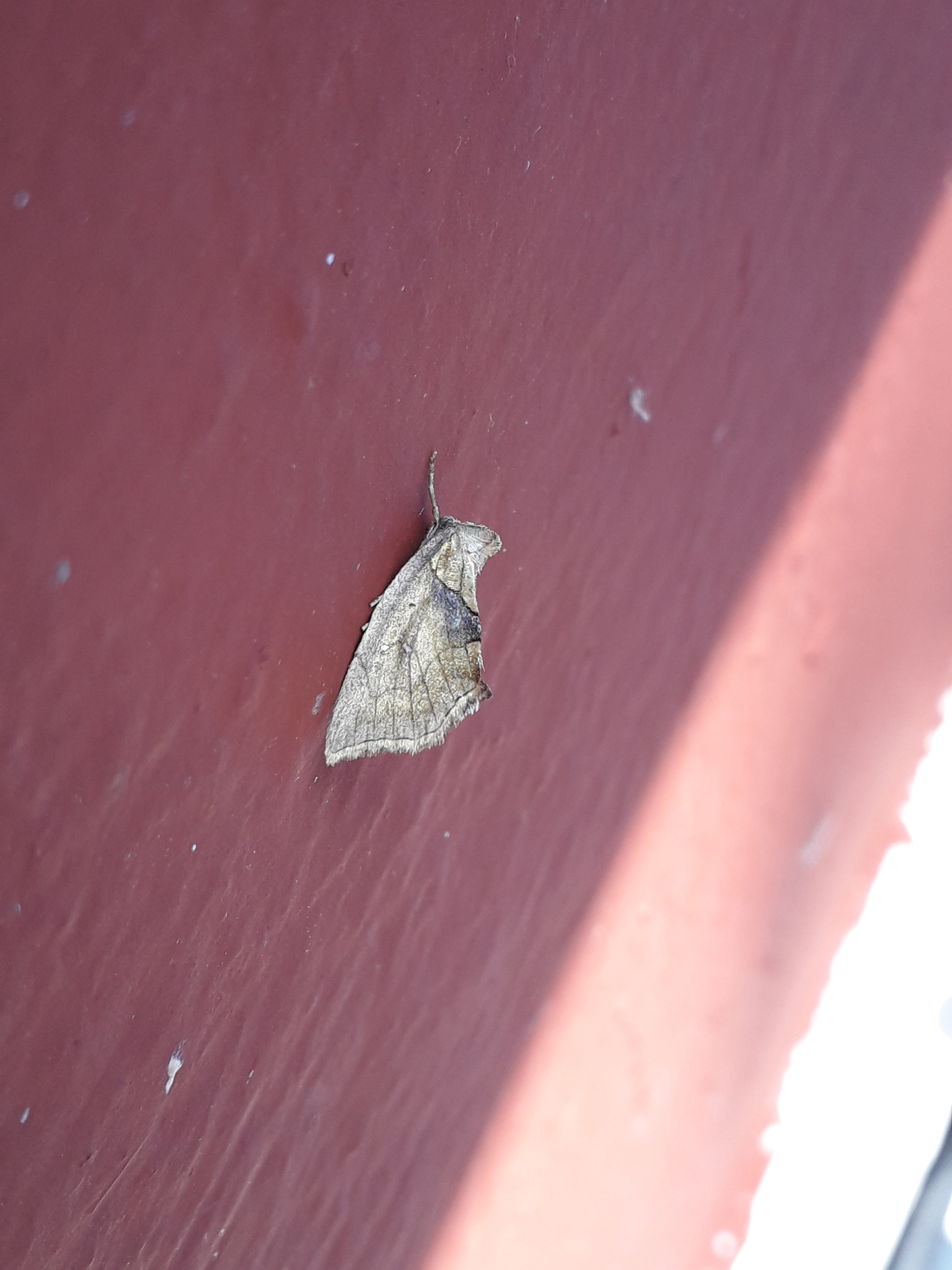
- Bistica noela, Mexico

Scientific classification
- Kingdom: Animalia
- Phylum: Arthropoda
- Class: Insecta
- Order: Lepidoptera
- Superfamily: Noctuoidea
- Family: Noctuidae
- Tribe: Stiriini
- Genus: Bistica; Dyar, 1912
- Species: B. noela

Binomial name
- Bistica noela (H. Druce, 1892)

Synonyms
- Mychonia noela H. Druce, 1892

= Bistica =

Genus of moths

Bistica is a monotypic moth genus of the family Noctuidae erected by Harrison Gray Dyar Jr. in 1912. Its only species, Bistica noela, was first described by Herbert Druce in 1892. It is found from Arizona to Mexico and Guatemala.
