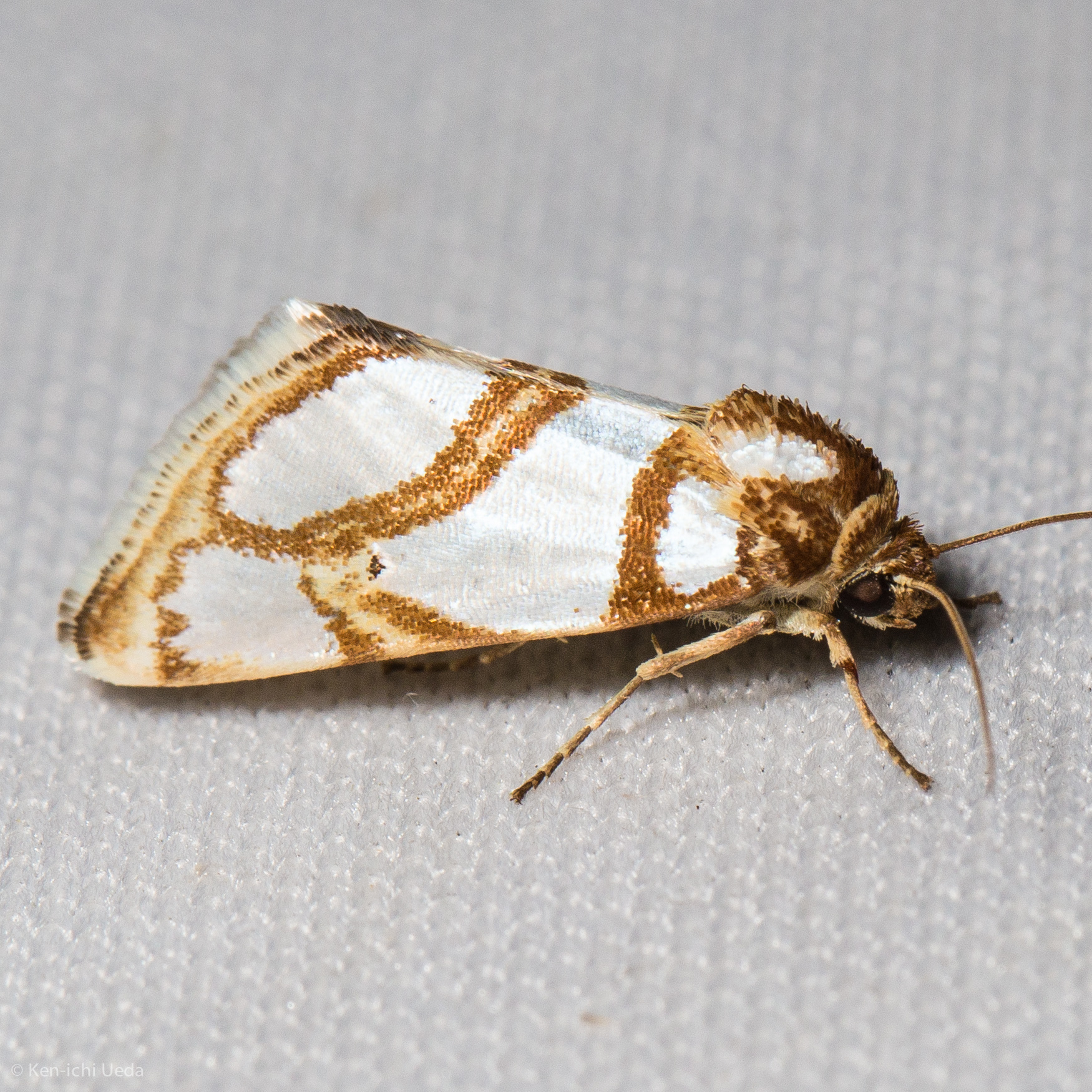
- Argentostiria koebelei, California

Scientific classification
- Domain: Eukaryota
- Kingdom: Animalia
- Phylum: Arthropoda
- Class: Insecta
- Order: Lepidoptera
- Superfamily: Noctuoidea
- Family: Noctuidae
- Tribe: Stiriini
- Genus: Argentostiria; Poole, 1995
- Species: A. koebelei

Binomial name
- Argentostiria koebelei (Riley, 1893)

Synonyms
- Antaplaga koebelei Riley, 1893; Chalcopasta coebelei Hampson, 1910

= Argentostiria =

Genus of moths

Argentostiria is a monotypic moth genus of the family Noctuidae erected by Robert W. Poole in 1995. Its only species, Argentostiria koebelei, was first described by Riley in 1893. It is found in the Mojave Desert of the United States.
