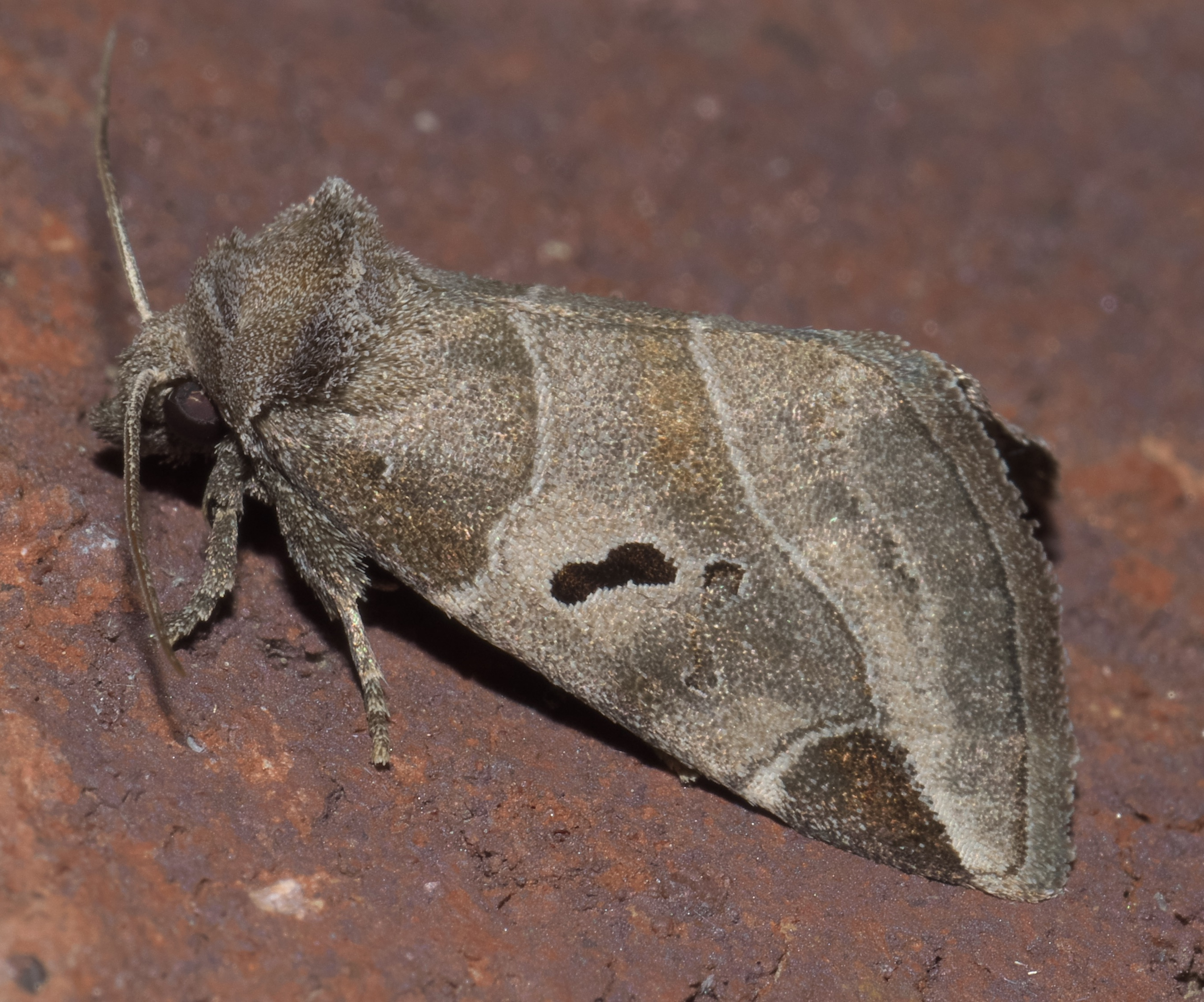
- Plagiomimicus pityochromus, black-barred brown, Oklahoma

Scientific classification
- Kingdom: Animalia
- Phylum: Arthropoda
- Class: Insecta
- Order: Lepidoptera
- Superfamily: Noctuoidea
- Family: Noctuidae
- Subfamily: Stiriinae
- Tribe: Stiriini; Grote, 1882

= Stiriini =

Tribe of moths

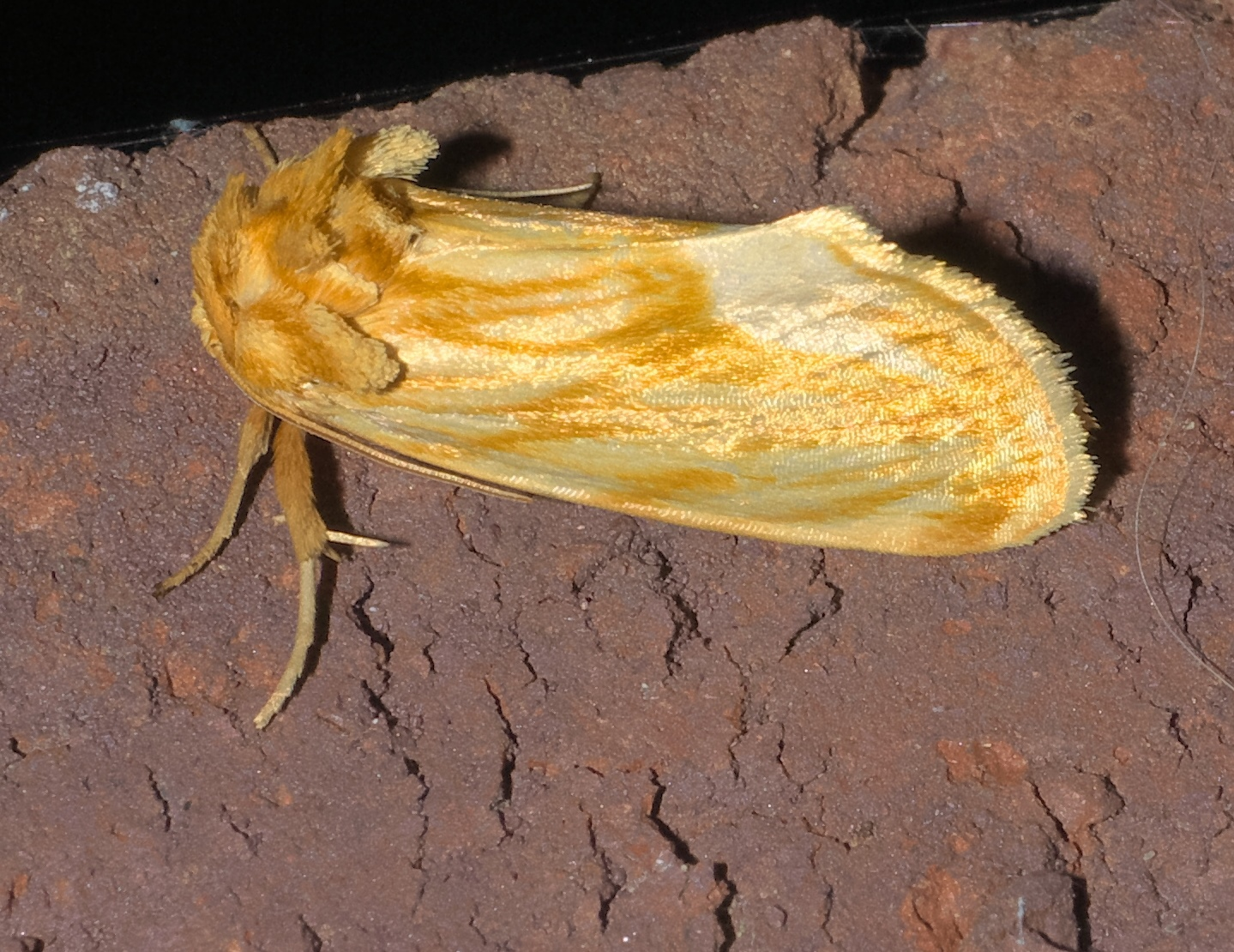
Cirrhophanus triangulifer, goldenrod stowaway, Oklahoma

Stiriini is a tribe of owlet moths in the family Noctuidae. There are about 16 genera and more than 90 described species in Stiriini.

Stiriini was formerly a tribe of the subfamily Amphipyrinae. As a result of phylogenetic research published in 2019, the tribe Stiriini was determined to be polyphyletic, with much of its diversity spread among three subfamilies. One of the three subfamilies was the existing family Metoponiinae. The other two subfamilies, Grotellinae and Stiriinae, were previously subtribes of Stiriini and were elevated to subfamily rank. Stiriini is now a tribe of the new subfamily Stiriinae, and contains the majority of the former subtribe Stiriina, along with a few other genera.

The moths of Stiriini are found in North America and, to a lesser extent, Central America and the Caribbean.

== Genera ==
These 16 genera belong to the tribe Stiriini:

- Angulostiria Poole, 1995
- Argentostiria Poole, 1995
- Basilodes Guenée, 1852
- Bistica Dyar, 1912
- Chalcopasta Hampson, 1908
- Chrysoecia Hampson, 1908
- Cirrhophanus Grote, 1872
- Cuahtemoca Hogue, 1963
- Eulithosia H. Edwards, 1884
- Hoplolythrodes Poole, 1995
- Lineostriastiria Poole, 1995
- Narthecophora Smith, 1900
- Neumoegenia Grote, 1882
- Plagiomimicus Grote, 1873
- Stiria Grote, 1874
- Xanthothrix H. Edwards, 1878
