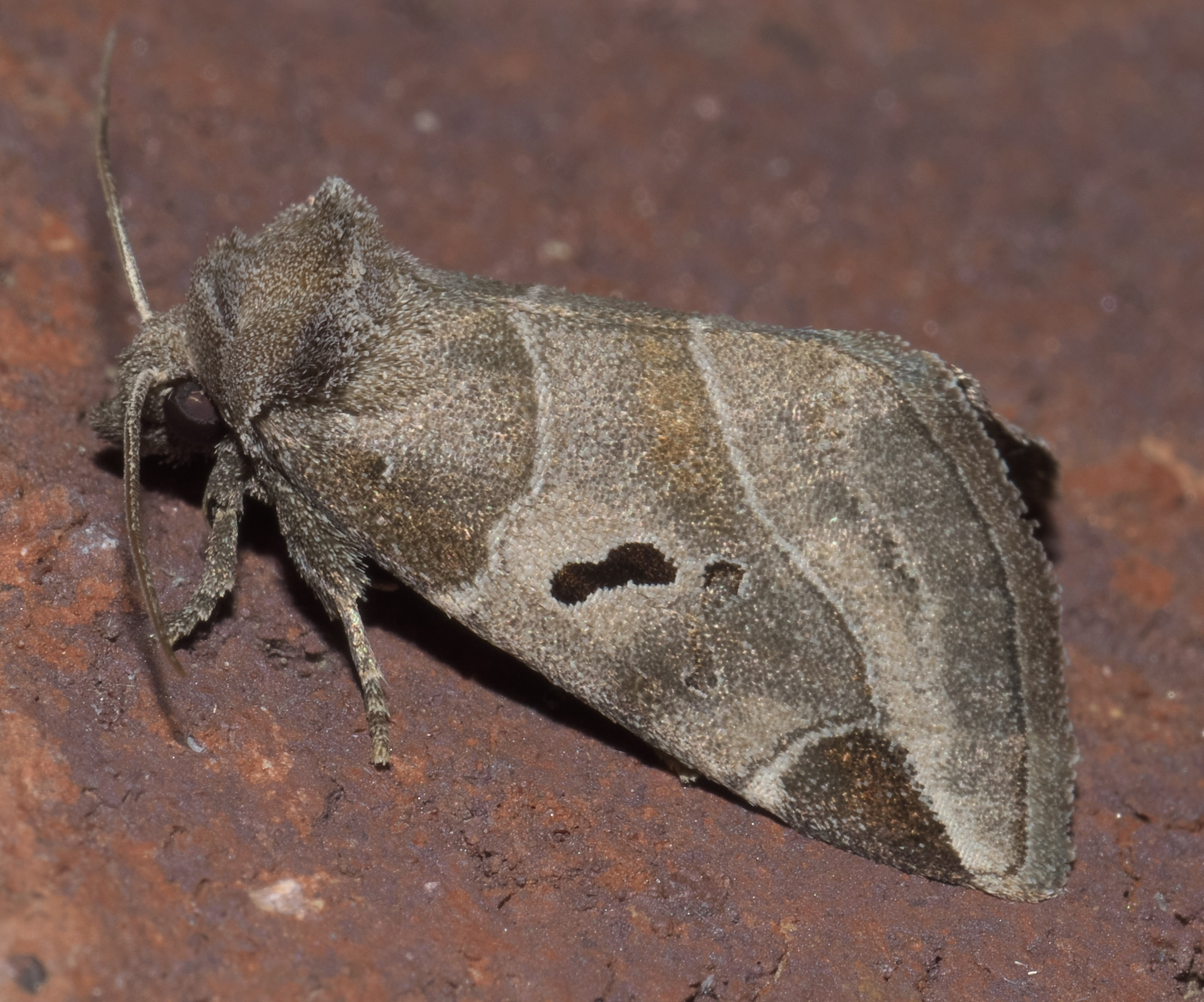
- Plagiomimicus pityochromus, Oklahoma

Scientific classification
- Domain: Eukaryota
- Kingdom: Animalia
- Phylum: Arthropoda
- Class: Insecta
- Order: Lepidoptera
- Superfamily: Noctuoidea
- Family: Noctuidae
- Subfamily: Stiriinae

Tribes
- Annaphilini; Stiriini Grote, 1882

= Stiriinae =

Subfamily of moths

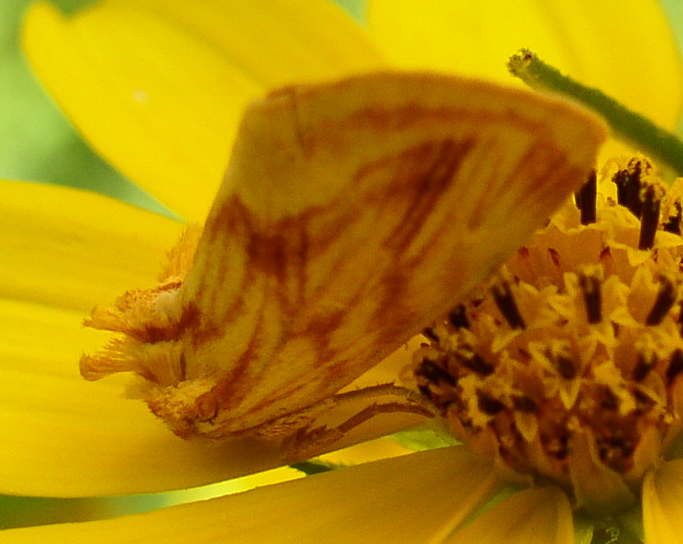
Cirrhophanus triangulifer (goldenrod stoway) on Solidago

Stiriinae is a subfamily of owlet moths in the family Noctuidae. There are more than 20 genera and 130 described species in Stiriinae.

The current classification of Stiriinae is based on phylogenetic research published in 2019 in which the tribe Stiriini was determined to be polyphyletic, with much of its diversity spread among three subfamilies, and a follow-up study in 2021 that found (at the time) non-Stiriinae genera grouped within Stiriinae in phylogenetic analyses. As a result of these studies, the tribe Stiriini was elevated to subfamily status as Stiriiinae, Grotellina, a subtribe of Stiriini before the 2019 study, was elevated to subfamily status as Grotellinae, and various other genera that were found to group in the closely related subfamily Metoponiinae were transferred into it. Stiriini and Annaphilini are now tribes of the currently recognized Stiriinae (with no subtribes within either) containing the majority of genera from the former subtribes Stiriina and Annaphilina that had existed prior to the 2019 study.

== Genera ==
These 21 genera belong to the subfamily Stiriinae:

Tribe Annaphilini
Annaphila Grote, 1873
Cerathosia Smith, 1887
Tribe Stiriini Grote, 1882
Angulostiria Poole, 1995
Argentostiria Poole, 1995
Basilodes Guenée, 1852
Bistica Dyar, 1912
Chalcopasta Hampson, 1908
Chrysoecia Hampson, 1908
Cirrhophanus Grote, 1872
Cuahtemoca Hogue, 1963
Eulithosia H. Edwards, 1884
Hoplolythrodes Poole, 1995
Lineostriastiria Poole, 1995
Narthecophora Smith, 1900
Neumoegenia Grote, 1882
Plagiomimicus Grote, 1873
Stiria Grote, 1874
Xanthothrix H. Edwards, 1878
Not assigned to a tribe
Fala Grote, 1875
Fota Grote, 1882
Stilbia Stephens, 1829
