= Pine Barrens (disambiguation) =

A pine barrens is a type of ecosystem characterized by soil that supports pine forests but is poor for agriculture. Pine barrens may also refer to:

== Particular pine barrens ==
- List of pine barrens
- Pine Barrens (New Jersey), in southern New Jersey
- Long Island Central Pine Barrens, New York
- Atlantic coastal pine barrens
- Plymouth Pinelands, also known as the Massachusetts Coastal Pine Barrens, in Massachusetts

== Other uses ==
- The Pine Barrens, a book by John McPhee
- "Pine Barrens" (The Sopranos), episode of the TV series
- "Pine Barrens" (What We Do in the Shadows), an episode of the TV series What We Do in the Shadows

== See also ==
- Pinelands (disambiguation)
