= Rome Sand Plains =

Protected area of New York

- IUCN category V (protected landscape/seascape)
- Location within New York
- Location: Oneida County, New York, USA
- Nearest city: Rome, New York
- Coordinates: 43°14′06″N 75°34′12″W
- Area: 4,000 acres (16 km^{2})
- Established: 1980
- Governing body: Rome Sand Plains Resource Management Team

Rome Sand Plains is a 15,000-acre (61 km^{2}) pine barrens about five miles (8.0 km) west of the city center of Rome in Oneida County in central New York. It consists of a mosaic of sand dunes rising about 50 feet (15 m) above low peat bogs that lie between the dunes. The barrens are covered with mixed northern hardwood forests, meadows, and wetlands. About 4,000 acres (16 km^{2}) are protected in conservation preserves. Pine barrens are typical of seacoasts; the Rome Sand Plains is one of only a handful of inland pine barrens remaining in the United States. A second inland pine barrens, the Albany Pine Bush, is also found in New York, located north and west of state's capital Albany.

E. W. Russell has described the Sand Plains as follows, "The landscape today forms a sharp contrast with the surrounding flat, fertile farmland, which is almost all cleared of trees and planted in crops. Uplands, including some dunes, support forest vegetation of American beech, white oak (Quercus alba), red and sugar maples, white and pitch pine (Pinus strobus and P. rigida), gray birch (Betula populifolia), hemlock, aspen (Populus spp.), American elm, and other northern hardwood species. Some uplands are also characterized as pitch pine heaths, dominated by pitch pines with an understory of blueberries (Vaccinium spp.) and other related (ericaceous) shrubs. Pitch pine is the characteristic tree of the wetlands, along with aspen, gray birch, and red maple, along with an ericaceous shrub layer."

Among the several rare species in the Sand Plains are the purple pitcher plant and a sundew (both of which are carnivorous plants), red-shouldered hawks, martens, and the frosted elfin butterfly, which is a threatened species in New York State. Other species to be found include wild blue lupine (also rare, and the food for the frosted elfin), barrens buckmoth (Hemileuca maia), whippoorwill, pine warbler and pitch pine, normally indigenous to coastal areas.

The Rome Sand Plains were owned privately through about 1980. The sand was mined to make molds and cores for metal casting. An application for a permit to mine sand around 1980 triggered a regional effort to protect the area. The New York State Department of Environmental Conservation (NYSDEC) began purchasing lands, working with The Nature Conservancy and other organizations. Approximately 1,700 acres (6.9 km^{2}) of the Sand Plains have been purchased by the NYSDEC, and are designated as the Rome Sand Plains Unique Area. The Nature Conservancy holds another 1,000 acres (4.0 km^{2}). The Izaak Walton League holds about 440 acres (1.8 km^{2}), Oneida County holds an additional 770 acres (3.1 km^{2}) as a County Forest, and a few acres are held by the City of Rome. A map showing these holdings was released by the NYSDEC in 2008; the map shows the location of three foot trails maintained by the NYSDEC and one by the Izaak Walton League. A consolidated management plan involving all five preserves, and addressing the entire Sand Plains area, was published in 2006.

The sand plains are considered by geologists to be a relic of Lake Iroquois, which was a somewhat larger version of the present Lake Ontario that existed near the end of the last ice age about twelve thousand years ago. The level of Lake Iroquois was about 100 feet (30 m) higher than Lake Ontario's present level. Lake Iroquois drained to the Atlantic Ocean through the Mohawk and Hudson rivers, and its outlet was near the present Sand Plains. Lake Ontario's outlet is near the Thousand Islands, and the lake drains through the Saint Lawrence River; this outlet was dammed by ice in the period when Lake Iroquois existed.

== See also ==
- List of pine barrens
