= Atlantic coastal pine barrens =

Temperate coniferous forest ecoregion of Northeast United States

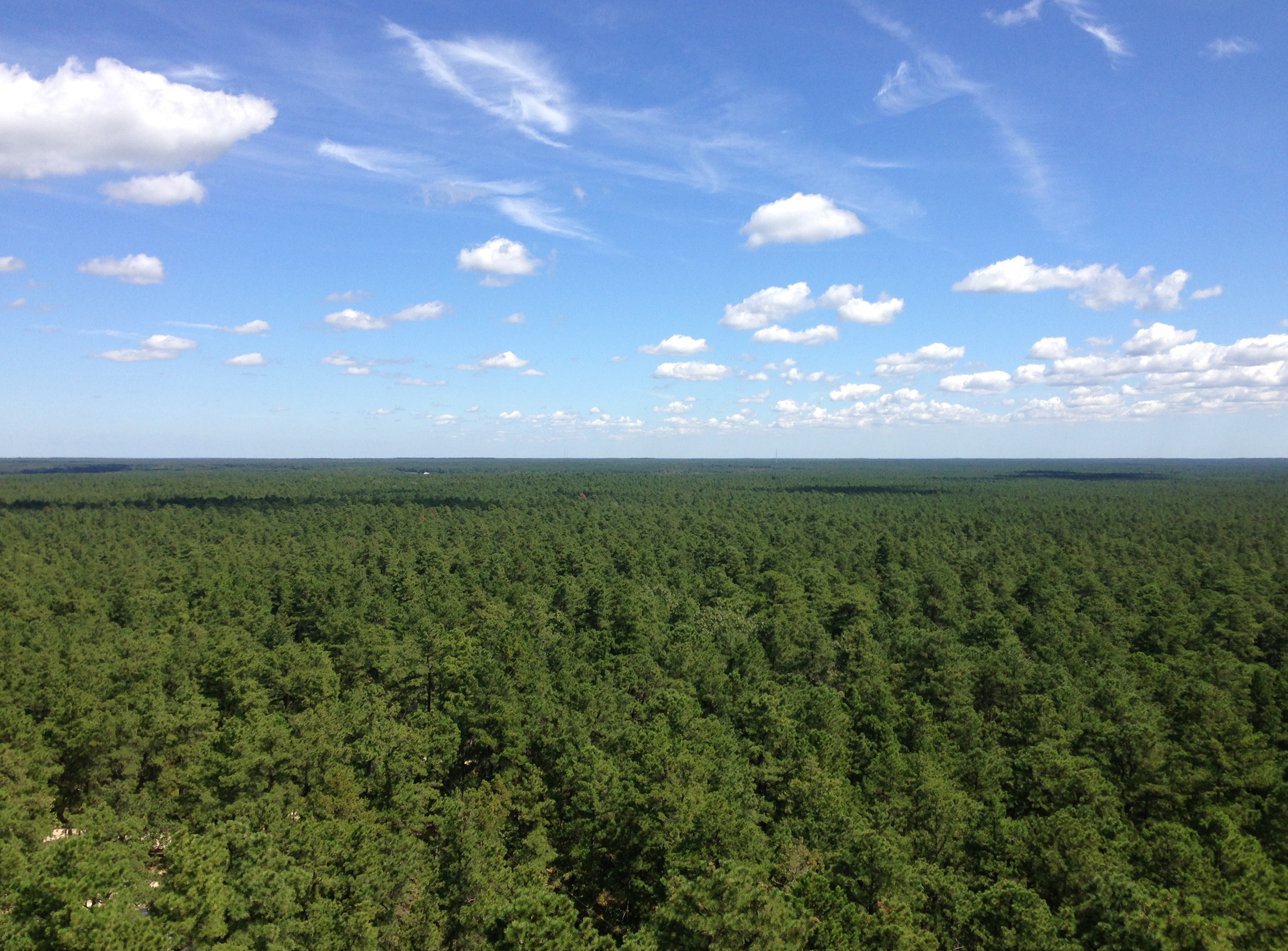
- The Pine Barrens of New Jersey

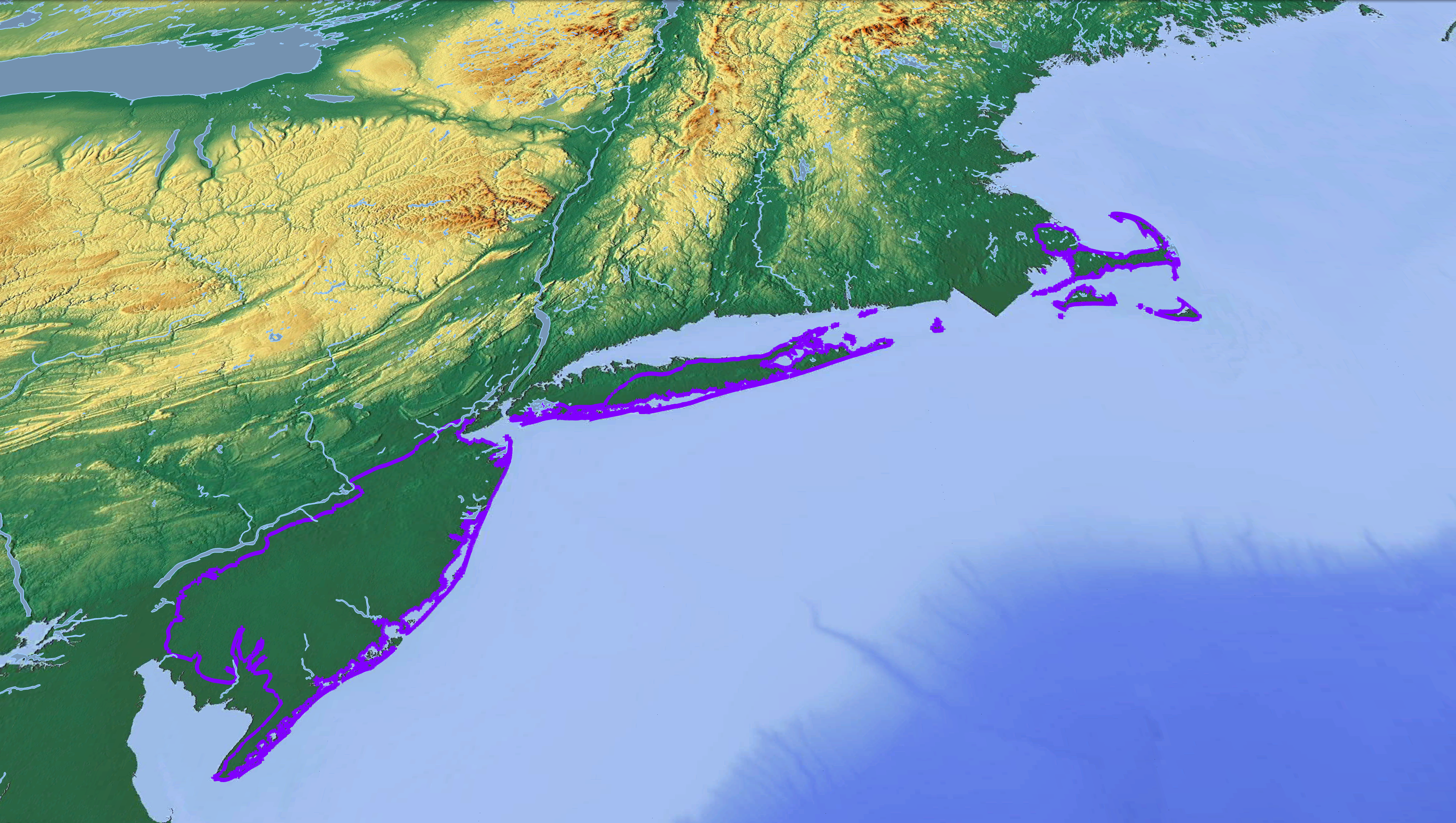
- Atlantic Coastal Pine Barrens encircled in magenta

Ecology
- Realm: Nearctic
- Biome: temperate coniferous forests
- Borders: Middle Atlantic coastal forests; Northeastern coastal forests
- Bird species: 212
- Mammal species: 45

Geography
- Area: 9,000 km^{2} (3,500 mi^{2})
- Country: United States
- States: New Jersey; New York; Massachusetts; Delaware; Maryland
- Climate type: Humid continental (Dfb), humid subtropical (Cfa) and oceanic (Cfb)

Conservation
- Habitat loss: 30.06%
- Protected: 22.9%

The Atlantic coastal pine barrens, now a rare temperate coniferous forest ecoregion of the Northeast United States, is distinguished by unique species and topographical features (coastal plain ponds, frost pocket), generally nutrient-poor, often acidic soils, and a pine tree distribution once controlled by frequent fires.

== Setting ==
This ecoregion once stretched from North Carolina to Nova Scotia but now covers a disjunct area with three remaining large contiguous areas: the New Jersey Pine Barrens on the coastal plain of New Jersey; the rapidly diminishing forests of southern Long Island in New York State; and the Massachusetts Coastal Pine Barrens, which stretches from Plymouth, Massachusetts to Cape Cod and the Islands of Martha's Vineyard and Nantucket.

The pine barrens are underlain by sandy, nutrient-poor soils, which typically support stunted forests dominated by pines (Pinus). The distinct flora of this ecoregion is maintained by the poor soils and frequent fires which revive the pines; the surrounding areas with better soils are part of the Middle Atlantic coastal forests and Northeastern coastal forests ecoregions.

== Climate ==
This ecoregion has a humid subtropical climate in Delaware, New Jersey, and Long Island, New York, and a humid continental climate in Massachusetts.

== Flora ==
The composition of the flora of the pine barrens is largely determined by fire frequency. Pitch-pine-dominated forests are the characteristic forests of this ecoregion, but where fires occur at intervals of 10 years or less, dwarf pine forests develop. Where fires are infrequent, Oak-dominated forests develop. In wetland areas grow cedar swamp forests and hardwood swamp forests.

=== Pine-Dominated Forests ===
Pitch pine (Pinus rigida) is the most abundant tree here. Shortleaf pine (Pinus echinata) is also present, but not as abundant. In the southern regions of the New Jersey Pine Barrens, loblolly pine (Pinus taeda) and pond pine (Pinus serotina) are present and fairly commonly encountered. A variety of oaks grow among the pines, including black oak (Quercus velutina), white oak (Quercus alba), post oak (Quercus stellata), chestnut oak (Quercus prinus), scarlet oak (Quercus coccinea), and blackjack oak (Quercus marilandica). These forests tend to be open with widely spaced trees and plenty of sunlight reaching the forest floor.

The understory is thick with shrubs, including black huckleberry (Gaylussacia baccata) and early lowbush blueberry (Vaccinium pallidum). Staggerbrush (Lyonia mariana), dangleberry (Gaylussacia frondosa), mountain laurel (Kalmia latifolia), and sheep laurel (Kalmia angustifolia) also occur. Bracken fern (Pteridium aquilinum) is abundant.

=== Dwarf Pine Forests ===
The only trees that can recover from frequent fires are pitch pine and blackjack oak, which are abundant here. Deprived of the opportunity to grow tall, these trees grow as shrubs that may only be 4 feet (120 cm) tall.

Black huckleberry and early lowbush blueberry are again common here. Mountain laurel, sheep laurel, and bearberry (Arctostaphylos uva-ursi) are also common.

=== Oak-Dominated Forests ===
Without fires, leaf litter accumulates, creating an environment that favors the establishment of oak seedlings instead of pine seedlings. In time, the pines grow old, die, and are replaced by oaks (Quercus spp.). The most common are black, scarlet, chestnut, white, and post oaks. Pitch and shortleaf pines are scattered among the oaks. The forest canopy tends to be closed.

The understory vegetation is similar to that of the pine-dominated forest, with black huckleberry, early lowbush blueberry, and dangleberry common.

=== Cedar Swamp Forests ===
Swamp forests dominated by Atlantic white cedar (Chamaecyparis thyoides) occur along the waterways of the pine barrens. The white cedars often grow from pools of standing water and, in contrast to the surrounding pine forests, considerably darken the understory. Amid the white cedars are red maple (Acer rubrum), sour gum (Nyssa sylvatica), pitch pine, and sweet bay magnolia (Magnolia virginiana). In openings and edges grow highbush blueberry, dangleberry, swamp azalea (Rhododendron viscosum), fetterbush (Eubotrys racemosa), and leatherleaf (Chamaedaphne calyculata). Sweet pepperbush (Clethra alnifolia), Sabatia kennedyana, inkberry (Ilex glabra), and winterberry (Ilex verticillata) are also present.

=== Hardwood Swamp Forests ===
Sweet gum (Liquidambar styraciflua) and red maple are the most abundant trees in the hardwood swamp forests. American holly (Ilex opaca), a broadleaf evergreen tree, is common. Pin oak (Quercus palustris), swamp white oak (Quercus bicolor), willow oak (Quercus phellos), tulip tree (Liriodendron tulipifera), sour gum, and sweet bay magnolia are associates.

Poison ivy (Toxicodendron radicans) and Japanese honeysuckle (Lonicera japonica) are often abundant and grow in thickets. Shrubs include arrowwood (Viburnum dentatum), spicebush (Lindera benzoin), highbush blueberry (Vaccinium corymbosum), sweet pepperbush (Clethra alnifolia), and swamp azalea.

=== Grasslands ===
The region also contains areas of maritime grassland on Martha's Vineyard, Nantucket, and out at the tip of Long Island that are unique in the United States (see Conscience Point National Wildlife Refuge for an example).

== Fauna ==
Wildlife adapted to this environment includes the Pine Barrens tree frog, Plymouth red-bellied turtle and the extinct heath hen. The beaches of these coasts are important breeding grounds for piping plovers (especially on Cape Cod, Martha's Vineyard, Nantucket, and Long Island) and roseate terns (especially on Bird Island).

== Threats and preservation ==
The pine barrens ecosystems have been severely damaged by urban developments as the east coast has become built up with housing, including vacation and retirement properties. Only about 10% of original habitat remains and is very fragmented. Blocks of remaining habitat include: the New Jersey Pine Barrens; Albany Pine Bush and Long Island Central Pine Barrens in New York; and the Massachusetts Coastal Pine Barrens with concentrations in Myles Standish State Forest, Manuel F. Correllus State Forest on Martha's Vineyard, Cape Cod National Seashore and Joint Base Cape Cod and the Mashpee Wampanoag Indian Reservation in Massachusetts. These areas are now well conserved.

== See also ==
- List of ecoregions in the United States (WWF)
- Pine barrens
