= Pinelands =

Pinelands may refer to:

== Australia ==
- Pinelands, Queensland, a locality in the Toowoomba Region
- Pinelands, Northern Territory, a suburb in City of Palmerston

== South Africa ==
- Pinelands, Cape Town, a suburb

== United States ==
- Pine Barrens (New Jersey)
- New Jersey Pinelands National Reserve
- Pinelands Regional School District, a school district in Tuckerton, New Jersey, USA
  - Pinelands Regional High School, a high school located in the aforementioned school district
- Plymouth Pinelands, a geographical region surrounding Plymouth, Massachusetts, USA

== See also ==
- Pineland (disambiguation)
- Pine barrens
