= Plymouth Pinelands =

Ecoregion in Massachusetts, United States

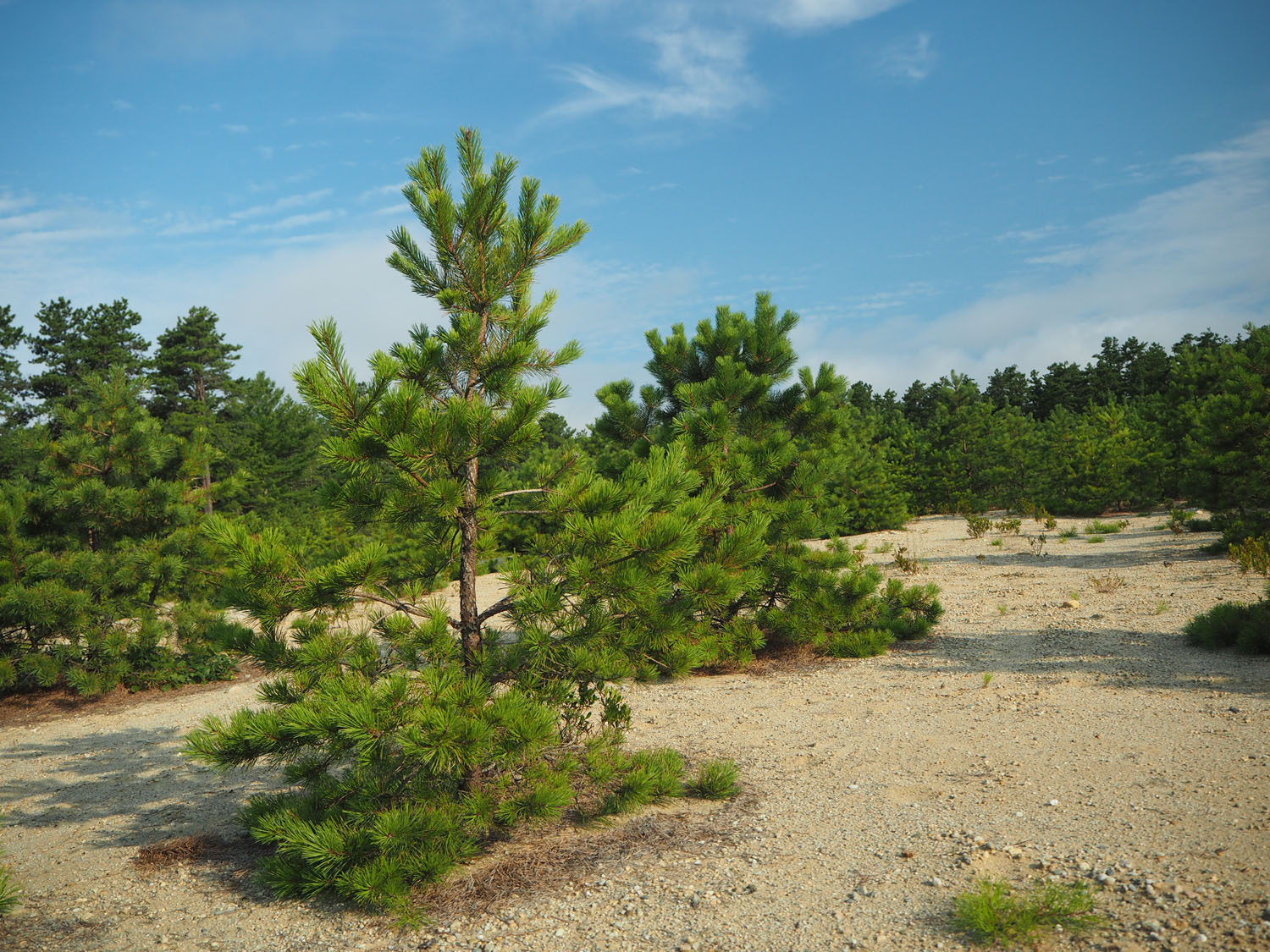
Pines (Pinus rigida) growing on sandy soils in the pine barrens of Plymouth, Massachusetts

The Plymouth Pinelands, also known as the Massachusetts Coastal Pine Barrens, or Plymouth pine barrens is an ecoregion located in Massachusetts in the United States. It is a part of the "Southeast Coast and Islands" ecoregion, as defined by the Massachusetts Division of Fisheries & Wildlife, and occurs within the Atlantic coastal pine barrens EPA Level III ecoregion.

This area is characterized by one of the largest remaining pine barren ecosystems remaining in the United States. At 8,000 hectares (20,000 acres), it is the 3rd largest following those in New Jersey and on New York's Long Island.

== Ecology ==
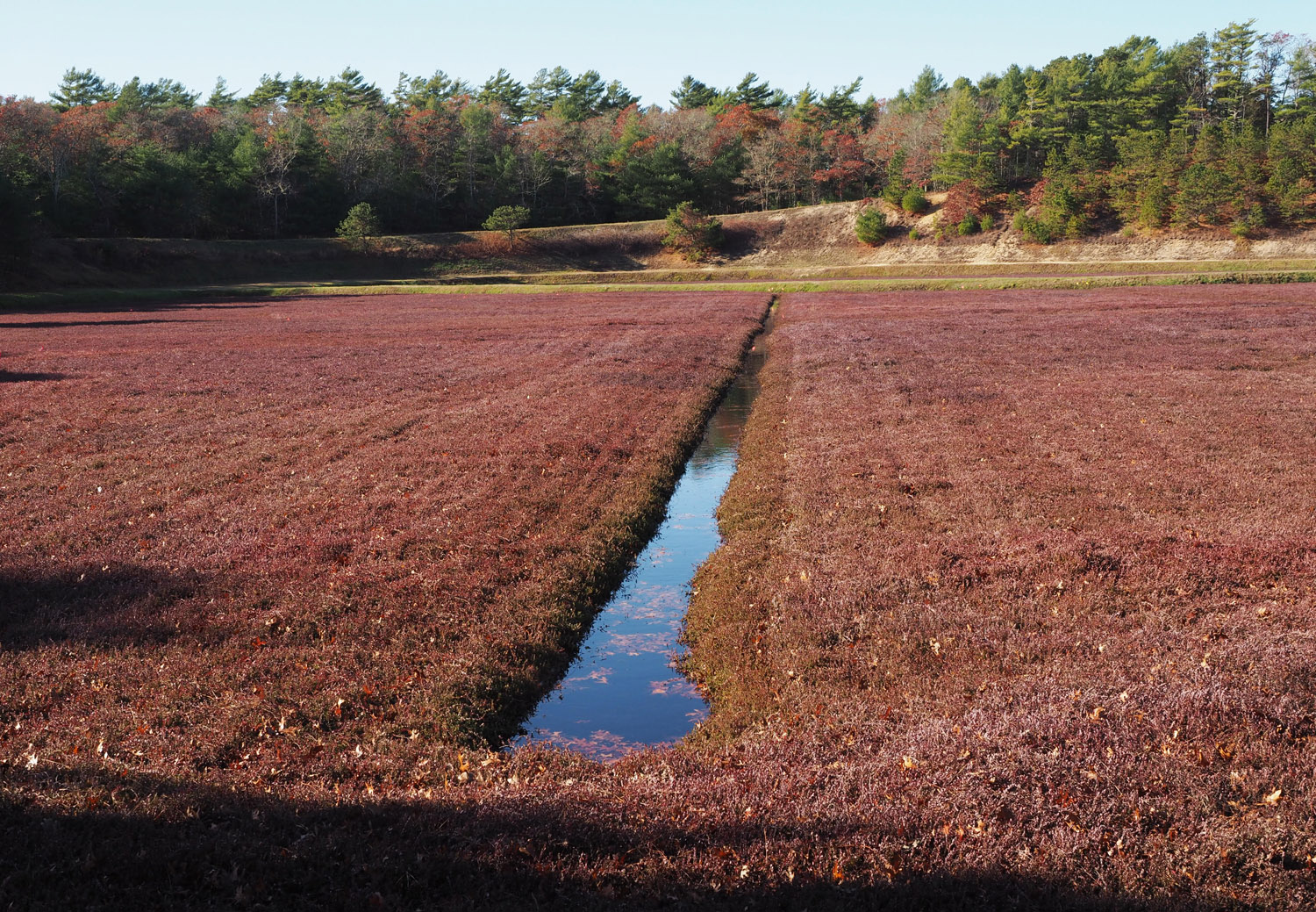
Commercial cranberry bog located within Plymouth pinelands, seen against a backdrop of pines and oaks.

Southeastern Massachusetts, Cape Cod, and the islands of Nantucket and Martha's Vineyard consist of outwash from the Last Glacial Maximum, which left thick glacial deposits of sand and gravel, providing the geologic foundation for a rare pine barren ecosystem. The canopy of the resulting drought-prone, fire-resistant ecological community is dominated by pitch pine and scrub oak. This region is also home to a distinct subpopulation of Northern red-bellied cooter, the Plymouth red-bellied turtle. The Pinelands sit atop deep deposits of glacially-deposited sands which filter and protect several sole-source aquifers including the Plymouth/Carver Sole Source Aquifer, the largest drinking water aquifer in Massachusetts.

== Threats ==
The pace of development has increased tremendously in this ecoregion. Large-scale development proposals and an increase in the number of new homes are altering the quality of life for residents and rapid residential development has led to the fragmentation of the region's natural areas.

Population increases have had serious secondary impacts as well, including the depletion of the water table by water supply wells and the potential pollution of the aquifer. The development has also led to the suppression of natural wildfire, necessary to maintain the pinelands' rare habitats. Damaging recreation, such as off-road vehicle use on pond shores and in fragile pine barrens, was also on the rise but in recent years the area has also seen an increase in awareness of the importance and fragility of the ecosystem and a corresponding increase in the number of groups working to protect and preserve the natural bounty.

== Plants ==
Sabatia kennedyana, New England boneset, golden hedge hyssops, shadbush Amelanchier, pines especially pitch pine, and to a lesser extent eastern white pine Pinus strobus, and scrub oak, among other plant species, are found in this region. Commercial cranberry (Vaccinium macrocarpon) bogs are present in the Plymouth pinelands.

== Animals ==
The federally endangered Plymouth red-bellied turtle (Pseudemys rubriventris ssp. bangsi) lives only in the Massachusetts Coastal Pine Barrens. However, several taxonomists no longer recognize this population as a separate subspecies, treating it only as a geographically-isolated population of northern red-bellied cooter. The pine forests are also home to numerous species of birds and insects.

== See also ==
Two other large, contiguous examples of this ecosystem remain in the northeastern United States, which include:

- Long Island Central Pine Barrens
- New Jersey Pine Barrens
