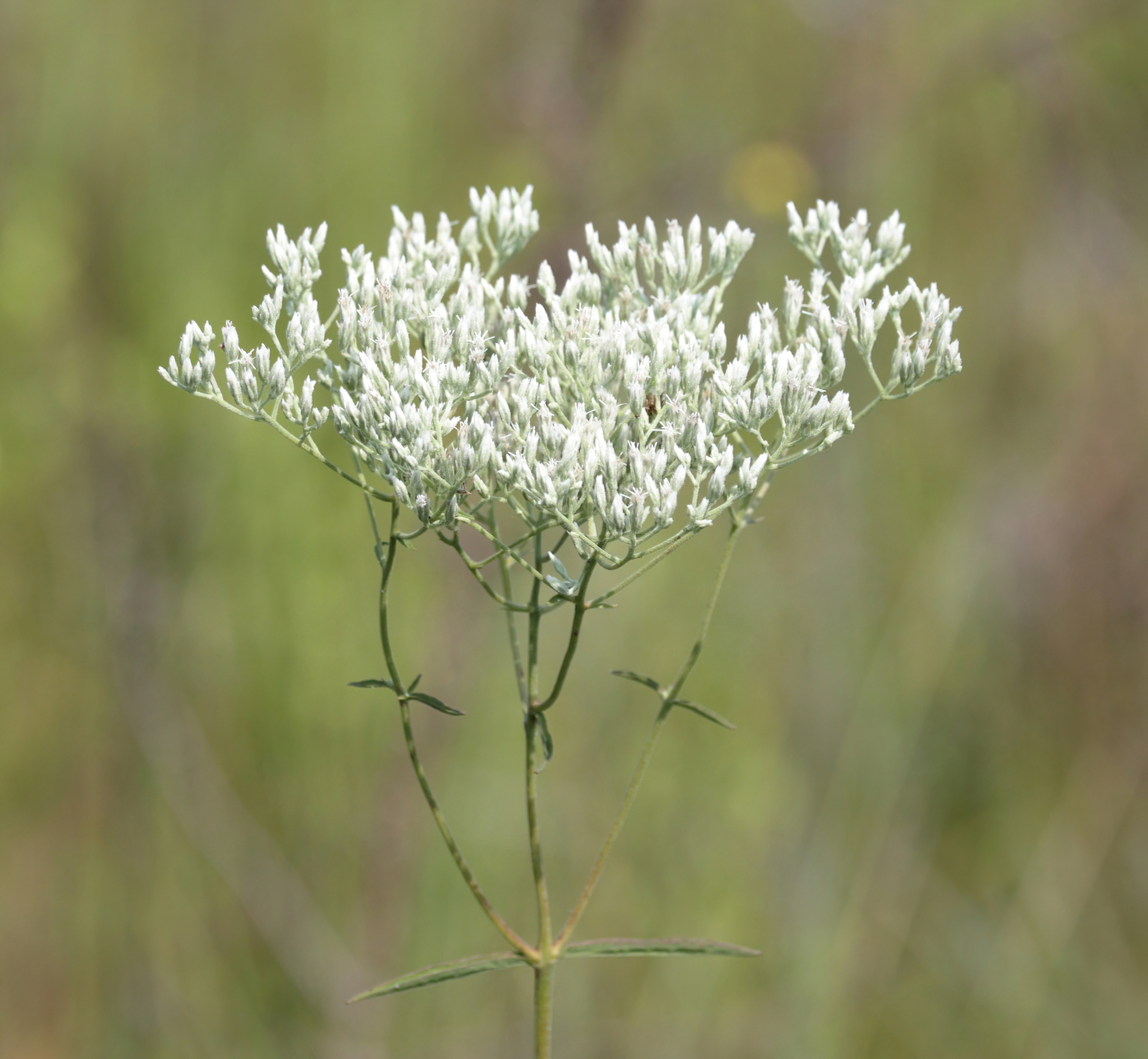

Conservation status
- Secure (NatureServe)

Scientific classification
- Kingdom: Plantae
- Clade: Tracheophytes
- Clade: Angiosperms
- Clade: Eudicots
- Clade: Asterids
- Order: Asterales
- Family: Asteraceae
- Genus: Eupatorium
- Species: E. leucolepis

Binomial name
- Eupatorium leucolepis (DC.) Torr. & A.Gray

Synonyms
- Eupatorium glaucescens var. leucolepis DC.; Uncasia leucolepis (Torr. & A.Gray) Greene

= Eupatorium leucolepis =

Justiceweed

Species of flowering plant

Eupatorium leucolepis, commonly called justiceweed or white-bracted thoroughwort, is a herbaceous perennial plant in the family Asteraceae native from the eastern coastal United States, from New York to eastern Texas, with scattered populations inland as far as Kentucky and West Virginia.

== Eupatorium paludicola and Eupatorium novae-angliae ==
Eupatorium paludicola consists of diploids from clay soils of North Carolina and South Carolina. Until the early 21st century, they were classified in E. leucolepis. Eupatorium novae-angliae, known from a dozen or so sites in Massachusetts and Rhode Island, is a hybrid-derived allopolyploid of Eupatorium paludicola and Eupatorium perfoliatum. In the past it was known as E. leucolepis var. novae-angliae but, like E. paludicola, it does not appear to be closely related to E. leucolepis.

It is self-sustaining, rather than being found only where both parents are present, so various authors since 1992 have proposed treating it as a distinct species.
