= Eupatorium paludicola =

Scientific classification
- Kingdom: Plantae
- Clade: Tracheophytes
- Clade: Angiosperms
- Clade: Eudicots
- Clade: Asterids
- Order: Asterales
- Family: Asteraceae
- Genus: Eupatorium
- Species: E. paludicola

Binomial name
- Eupatorium paludicola E.E.Schill. & LeBlond

Species of flowering plant

Eupatorium paludicola, also called Bay Boneset, or swamp justiceweed, is a rare North American species of plant in the family Asteraceae, found only in the States of North Carolina and South Carolina in the southeastern United States. It is only known to occur in a few Carolina Bay habitats.

Eupatorium paludicola was for many years considered part of E. leucolepis until molecular analysis showed it to be a distinct species.

Eupatorium paludicola is a perennial herb spreading by means of underground rhizomes. It has long, narrowly lance-shaped leaves. Hybrids have been reported between E. paludicola and E. mohrii.
