= List of pine barrens =

The following is a list of pine barrens.

Canada

- Kaladar Jack Pine Barrens in Ontario

United States

- Kentucky
  - Hi Lewis Pine Barrens State Nature Preserve
- Maine
  - Waterboro Barrens Preserve
  - Hollis Plains
- Massachusetts
  - Plymouth Pinelands
- Michigan
  - Huron National Forest
- New Hampshire
  - Ossipee Pine Barrens
  - Concord Pine Barrens
- New Jersey
  - Pine Barrens
- New York
  - Albany Pine Bush
  - Altona Flat Rock Jack Pine Barrens
  - Long Island Central Pine Barrens
  - Rome Sand Plains
  - Shawangunk Ridge
- Pennsylvania
  - Long Pond Barrens
  - Scotia Barrens
- Rhode Island
  - Kingston Pine Barrens
- West Virginia
  - North Fork Mountain
- Wisconsin
  - Great Lakes Barrens
  - Moquah Barrens Research Natural Area
  - Northwest Wisconsin Pine Barrens
  - Gotham Jack Pine Barrens
  - Spread Eagle Barrens
- Virginia
  - Zuni Pine Barrens
