= Pineland =

Pineland may refer to:

- Pineland, Florida, U.S.
  - Pineland Archeological District
- Pineland, Texas, U.S.
- Pineland Farms, a former hospital, now parks and buildings, in New Gloucester, Maine, U.S.
- People's Republic of Pineland, a fictitious country in North Carolina used for U.S. Army Special Forces training
- The Pineland, a plantation in South Carolina, U.S.

== See also ==
- Pinelands (disambiguation)
