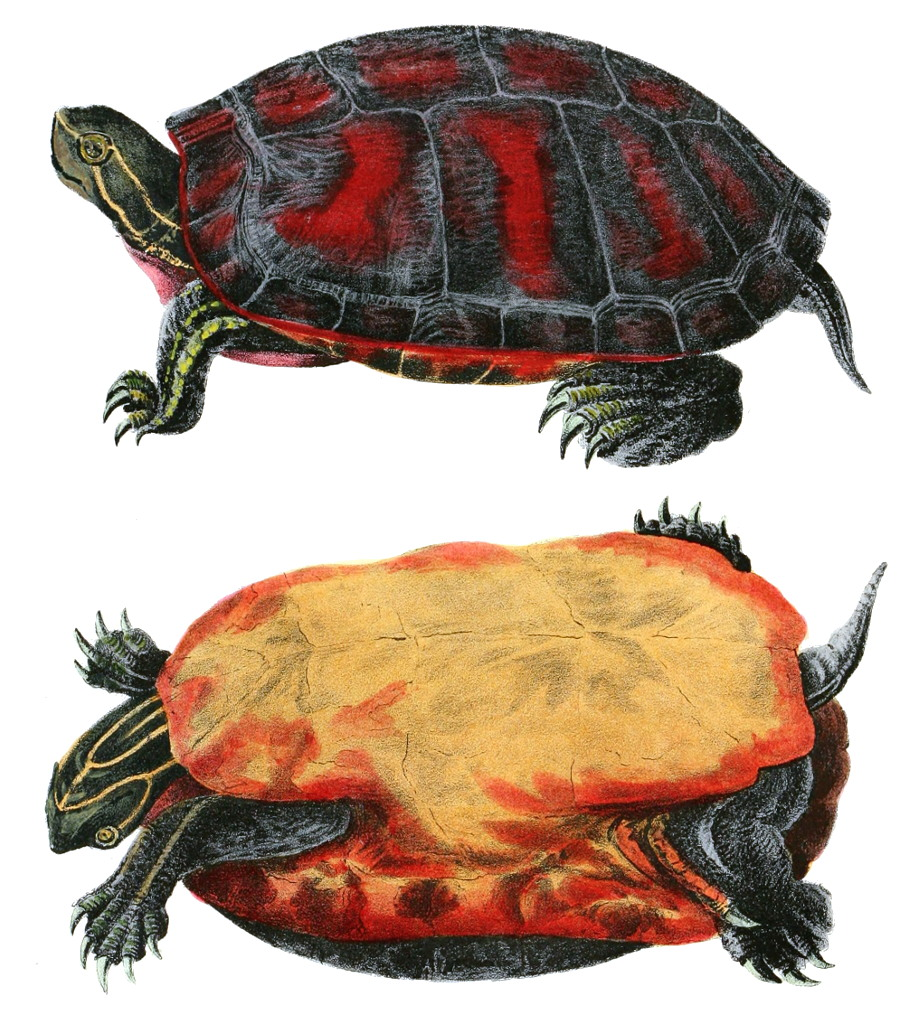

Conservation status
- Near Threatened (IUCN 3.1)

Scientific classification
- Kingdom: Animalia
- Phylum: Chordata
- Class: Reptilia
- Order: Testudines
- Suborder: Cryptodira
- Family: Emydidae
- Genus: Pseudemys
- Species: P. rubriventris

Binomial name
- Pseudemys rubriventris (Le Conte, 1830)

Synonyms
- Testudo rubriventris LeConte, 1830; Terrapene rubriventris Bonaparte, 1830; Emys irrigata Bell, 1835; Emys irrigita Duméril & Bibron, 1835 (ex errore); Emys rubriventris Duméril & Bibron, 1835; Clemmys (Clemmys) rubriventris Fitzinger, 1835; Chrysemys rubriventris Boulenger, 1889; Pseudemys rubriventris Baur, 1893; Pseudemys rubriventris bangsi Babcock, 1937; Pseudemys rubriventris rubriventris Babcock, 1937; Chrysemys rubriventris rubriventris Weaver & Rose, 1967; Chrysemys rubriventris bangsi Ernst & Barbour, 1972; Pseudemys bangsi Collins, 1991; Chrysemys rubriventris fubriventris Gosławski & Hryniewicz, 1993 (ex errore)

= Northern red-bellied cooter =

Species of turtle

The northern red-bellied cooter (Pseudemys rubriventris) or American red-bellied cooter is a species of turtle in the Pseudemys (cooter) genus of the family Emydidae.

== Description ==
This is a fairly large river turtle. Females average about 30 cm (12 in) in length and weigh on average around 3 kg (6.6 lb), although large females can measure up to 40 cm (16 in). Males' maximum size is 29.5 centimetres (11.6 in). The northern red-bellied turtle is the largest recorded basking turtle in the Chesapeake Bay region.

== Distribution and habitat ==
It is endemic to the United States. The current range of the red-bellied turtle includes a population in Massachusetts, the Plymouth red-bellied turtle, which was previously considered a distinct subspecies (Pseudemys rubriventris bangsi) as well as the coastal areas of New Jersey, Pennsylvania, Delaware, Maryland, Virginia and North Carolina.

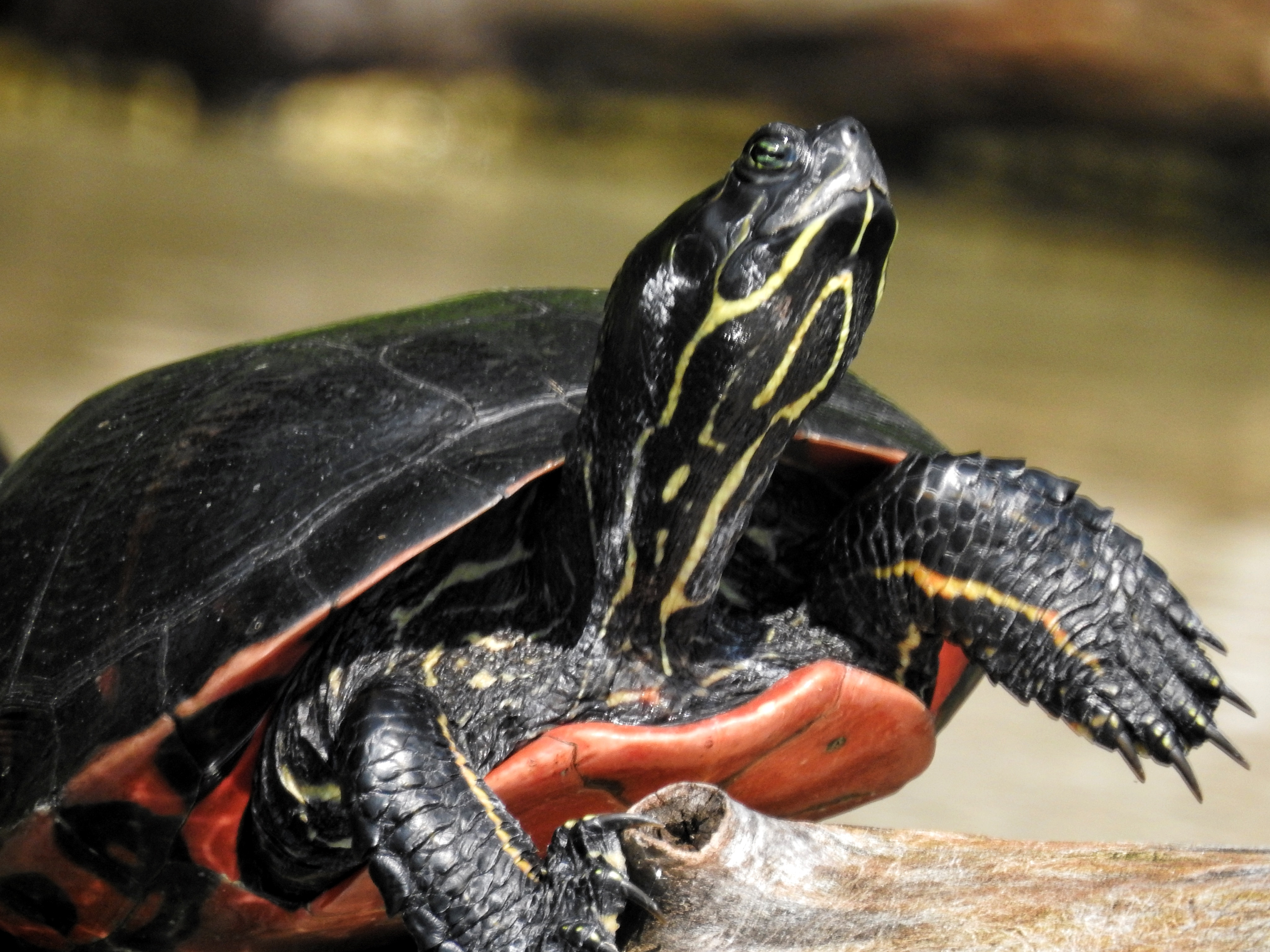
A northern red-bellied cooter in Long Pond in Plymouth, Massachusetts in July 2021.

The red-bellied turtle has appeared on Pennsylvania Fish and Boat Commission lists of endangered amphibians and reptiles since 1978 (McCoy 1985). By 1985 the red-bellied turtle was known to exist in Pennsylvania only in isolated colonies in a few counties (McCoy 1985). Small (less than thirty individuals) colonies were known in Manor and Silver lakes in Bucks County, the Tinicum wetlands in Philadelphia and Delaware Counties, the West Branch of Conococheague Creek in Franklin County and possibly Springton Reservoir in Delaware County (McCoy 1985).

== Conservation ==
The red-bellied turtle is a threatened species within Pennsylvania. However, the Plymouth red-bellied turtle distinct population segment is listed as endangered by the US Fish and Wildlife Service as well as the Division of Fisheries and Wildlife (Massachusetts).

The potential threats to red-bellied turtle populations are numerous. Primary threats include wetland loss, habitat fragmentation, pollution, collecting of turtles for pets, food or other trophies, competition with the invasive red-eared slider turtle (Trachemys scripta elegans) for food, habitat, basking sites or nesting sites, and the potential for hybridization with red-eared slider turtles.

The Massachusetts wildlife preserve foundation has started to repopulate the turtles by placing them in many southeastern Massachusetts ponds. One example is at Long and Little Long Pond in Plymouth, Massachusetts, where the population is starting to regrow.
