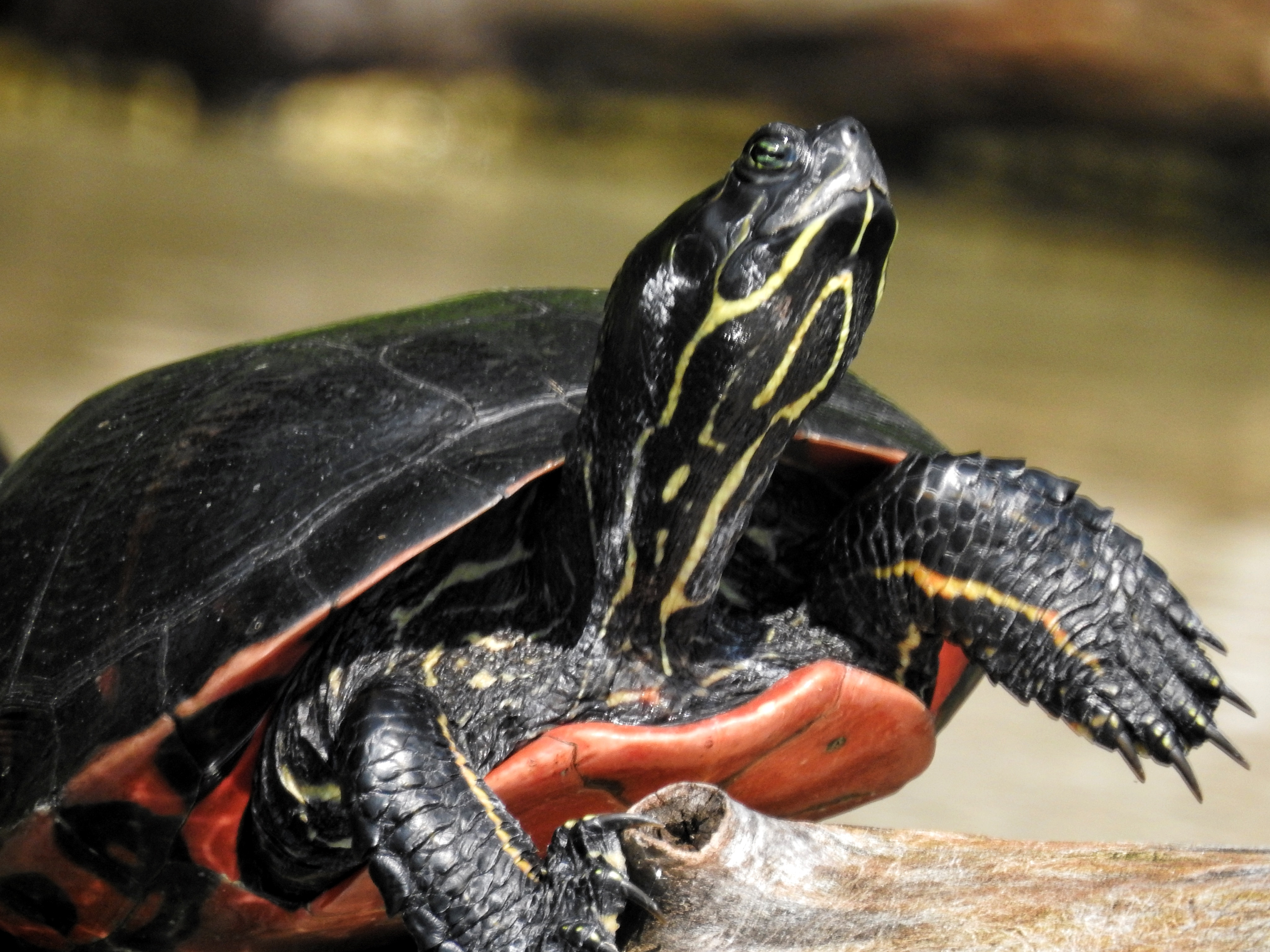
- Plymouth red-bellied turtle on Long Pond in Plymouth, Massachusetts

Conservation status
- Imperiled (NatureServe)

- Endangered (ESA)

Scientific classification
- Kingdom: Animalia
- Phylum: Chordata
- Class: Reptilia
- Order: Testudines
- Suborder: Cryptodira
- Family: Emydidae
- Genus: Pseudemys
- Species: P. rubriventris
- Population: Plymouth red-bellied turtle

Synonyms
- Pseudemys rubriventris subsp. bangsi Babcock, 1937

= Plymouth red-bellied turtle =

Population of red-bellied turtle

The Plymouth red-bellied turtle, sometimes called the Plymouth red-bellied cooter, is a disjunct population of northern red-bellied cooter (Pseudemys rubriventris) endemic to Massachusetts.

== Taxonomy ==
Plymouth red-bellied turtles are currently not considered a full subspecies (described as Pseudemys rubriventris bangsi), but instead as a population, and that they belong in synonymy under Pseudemys rubriventris or the northern red-bellied cooter. Nevertheless, it is well recognized that the Plymouth red-bellied turtle extends the range of the northern red-bellied cooter by 30–40 percent.

== Description ==
This turtle gets its name from its reddish plastron or undershell. They have flattened or slightly concave vertebral scutes with a red bar on each marginal scute. Their upper shell or carapace ranges from brown to black. An arrow-shaped stripe runs atop head, between the eyes, to their snout. Adults are 10–12.5 inches (25–32 cm). Males have elongated, straight claws on the front feet.

== Distribution and habitat ==
This species lives in the Plymouth Pinelands of Massachusetts. It spends most of its time in bodies of deep, quickly moving freshwater with muddy bottoms and large amounts of vegetation. It can be found in lakes, ponds, creeks, rivers, streams, and marshes. It was endemic to Plymouth County, Massachusetts before the state began trying to establish populations in other areas. The population was reduced to 200–300 turtles by the 1980s. By 2007, there were estimated to be 400–600 breeding age turtles across 20 ponds, and 2011 within 17 ponds.

== Ecology and behavior ==
The Plymouth red-bellied turtle often suns itself upon rocks in order to maintain its body temperature; however, if it is frightened while doing so, it will go back into the water. During the wintertime, this turtle hibernates in the mud at the bottoms of rivers.

=== Predators ===
Eggs and young turtles are hunted by skunks, raccoons, birds, and fish.

=== Life cycle ===
In spring and summer, the females nest in sand while the males look for food. Females lay 5–17 eggs at a time. The incubation of the eggs takes 73 to 80 days, and the eggs hatch at around 25 °C (77 °F). Hatchlings are about 32 millimetres (1.3 in) long. Their natural lifespan is 40 to 55 years.

== Conservation ==
The Plymouth red-bellied turtle is endangered due to overhunting by its natural predator, the striped skunk, and pollution from herbicides dumped into streams and ponds. Loss of habitat, as a result of filling in ponds to create houses is also a major issue. In 1983, Massasoit National Wildlife Refuge was established to help conserve the Plymouth red-bellied turtle. It was the first freshwater turtle in the US to be listed as endangered by the United States Fish and Wildlife Service.
