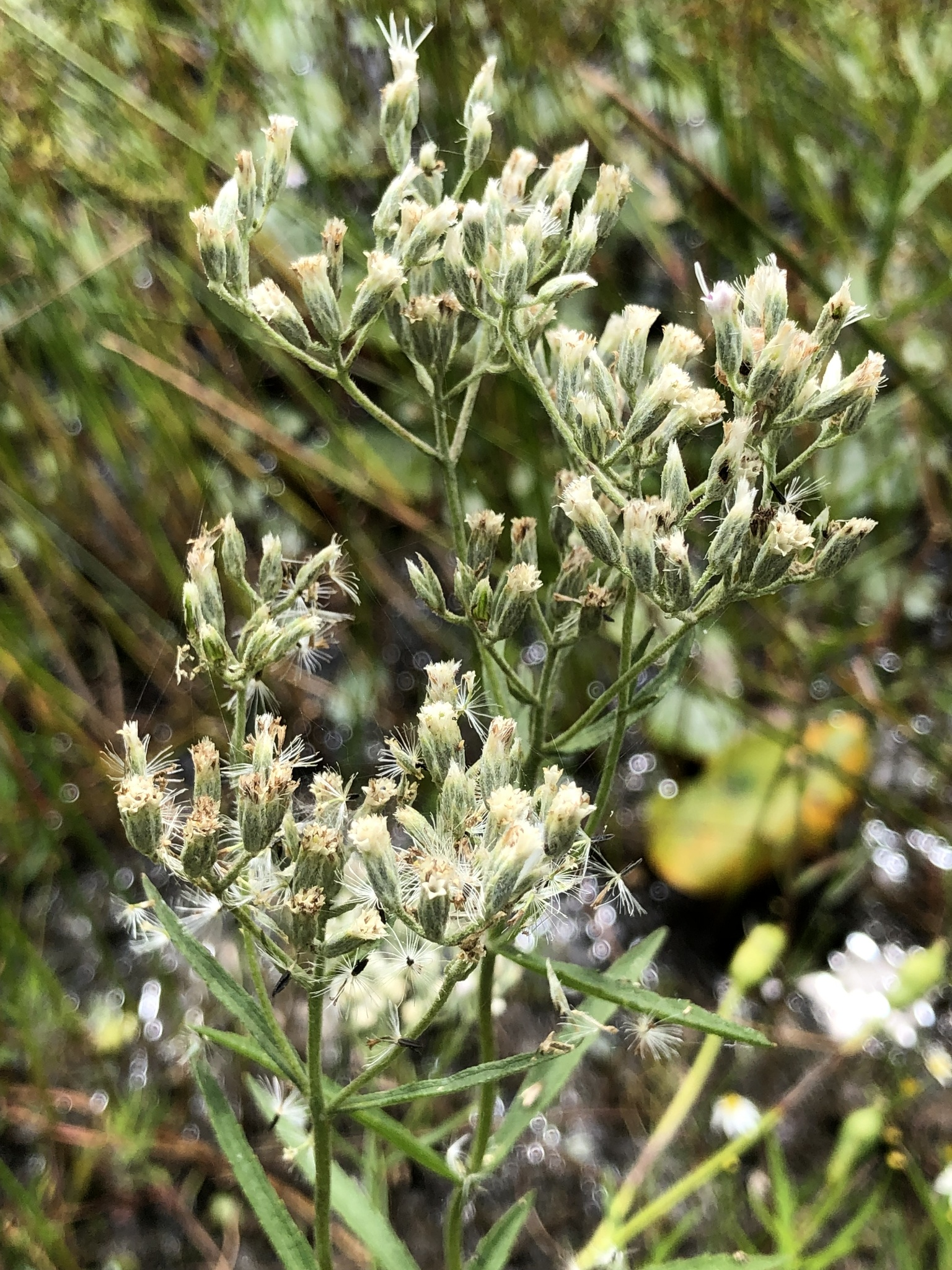

Scientific classification
- Kingdom: Plantae
- Clade: Tracheophytes
- Clade: Angiosperms
- Clade: Eudicots
- Clade: Asterids
- Order: Asterales
- Family: Asteraceae
- Genus: Eupatorium
- Species: E. novae-angliae

Binomial name
- Eupatorium novae-angliae (Fernald) V.Sullivan ex A.Haines & Sorrie 2005

Synonyms
- Eupatorium leucolepis var. novaeangliae Fern. 1937

= Eupatorium novae-angliae =

New England thoroughwort

Species of flowering plant

Eupatorium novae-angliae, commonly called New England boneset, New England justiceweed or New England thoroughwort, is a rare and endangered North American species in the family Asteraceae. It is found only in 4 counties in southern New England (Plymouth and Barnstable Counties in Massachusetts, plus Newport and Washington Counties in Rhode Island). The species is listed as endangered species in both states.

Specimens of Eupatorium novae-angliae have been collected for many years, classified by botanists as the more widespread species E. leucolepis, found from Long Island to Texas. More recent analysis of DNA sequence data reveals that the New England plants do not appear to be closely related to E. leucolepis. Eupatorium novae-angliae first formed as a hybrid between two other species, neither of them E. leucolepis. It is self-sustaining, rather than being found only where both parents are present, so various authors since 1992 have proposed treating it as a distinct species. A formal renaming was published in 2005.

Eupatorium novae-angliae is a tall perennial sometimes over 3 feet (90 cm) tall. It has opposite, lance-shaped leaves, and flat-topped arrays of a large number of tiny flower heads. Each head has 5-7 white disc florets but no ray florets.
