= Conscience Point National Wildlife Refuge =

Protected area in New York, US

- IUCN category IV (habitat/species management area)
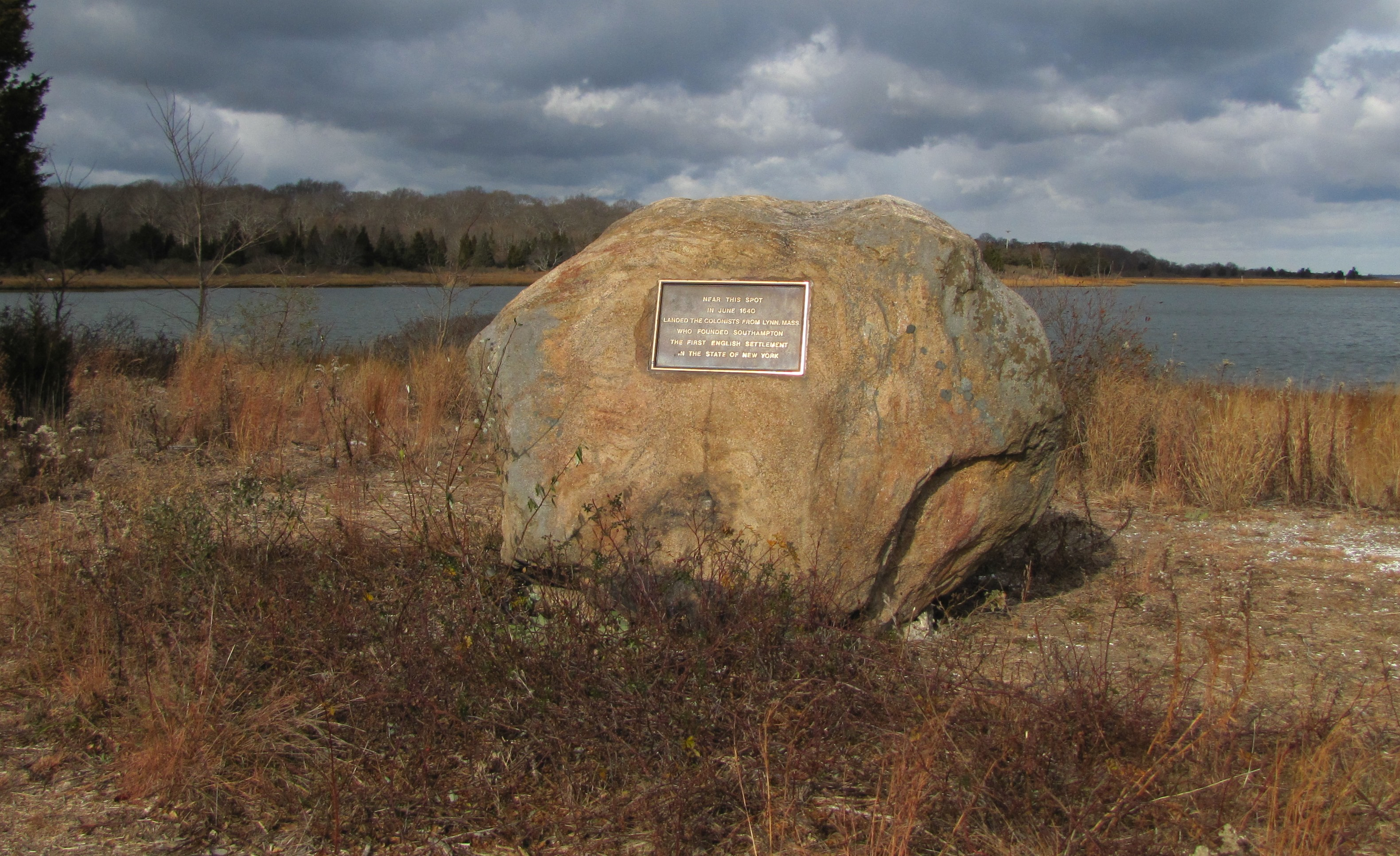
- Historic settlers rock within the wildlife refuge

- Location within the United States
- Location: Suffolk County, New York, United States
- Nearest city: North Sea, New York
- Coordinates: 40°56′29″N 72°25′15″W
- Area: 60 acres (24 ha)
- Established: July 20, 1971
- Governing body: U.S. Fish and Wildlife Service
- Website: Conscience Point National Wildlife Refuge

The Conscience Point National Wildlife Refuge was established July 20, 1971, as a land gift from Stanley Howard. The 60-acre (24 ha) refuge is located in the hamlet of North Sea, New York, on the north shore of Long Island's south fork. The refuge protects grasslands, oak-beech forest, shrub habitats, kettle holes, freshwater marsh and salt marsh.

The refuge grasslands are a habitat model for maritime grasslands, a disappearing habitat type on Long Island due to development. Maritime grasslands are native grasslands composed of little bluestem (Schizachyrium scoparium), switchgrass (Panicum virgatum), poverty grass (Danthonia spicata), hairgrass (Deschampsia flexuosa), and prickly pear cactus (Opuntia humifusa).

Wildlife on the refuge is as diverse as its habitats. Waterfowl are primarily American black ducks and bufflehead. The grasslands are being managed and enlarged specifically to attract grassland dependent birds such as grasshopper sparrow, eastern meadowlark, Savannah sparrow and bobolink. Due to its coastal location, the refuge is heavily used by migratory songbirds, shorebirds and raptors. The refuge also supports endangered and threatened species.
