= Long Island Central Pine Barrens =

Natural area in Suffolk County, New York, United States

- Location within New York
- Location: New York, United States
- Nearest city: Manorville
- Coordinates: 40°52′48″N 72°44′32″W
- Area: 100,000 acres (400 km^{2})
- Established: 1993
- Governing body: Central Pine Barrens Joint Planning and Policy Commission

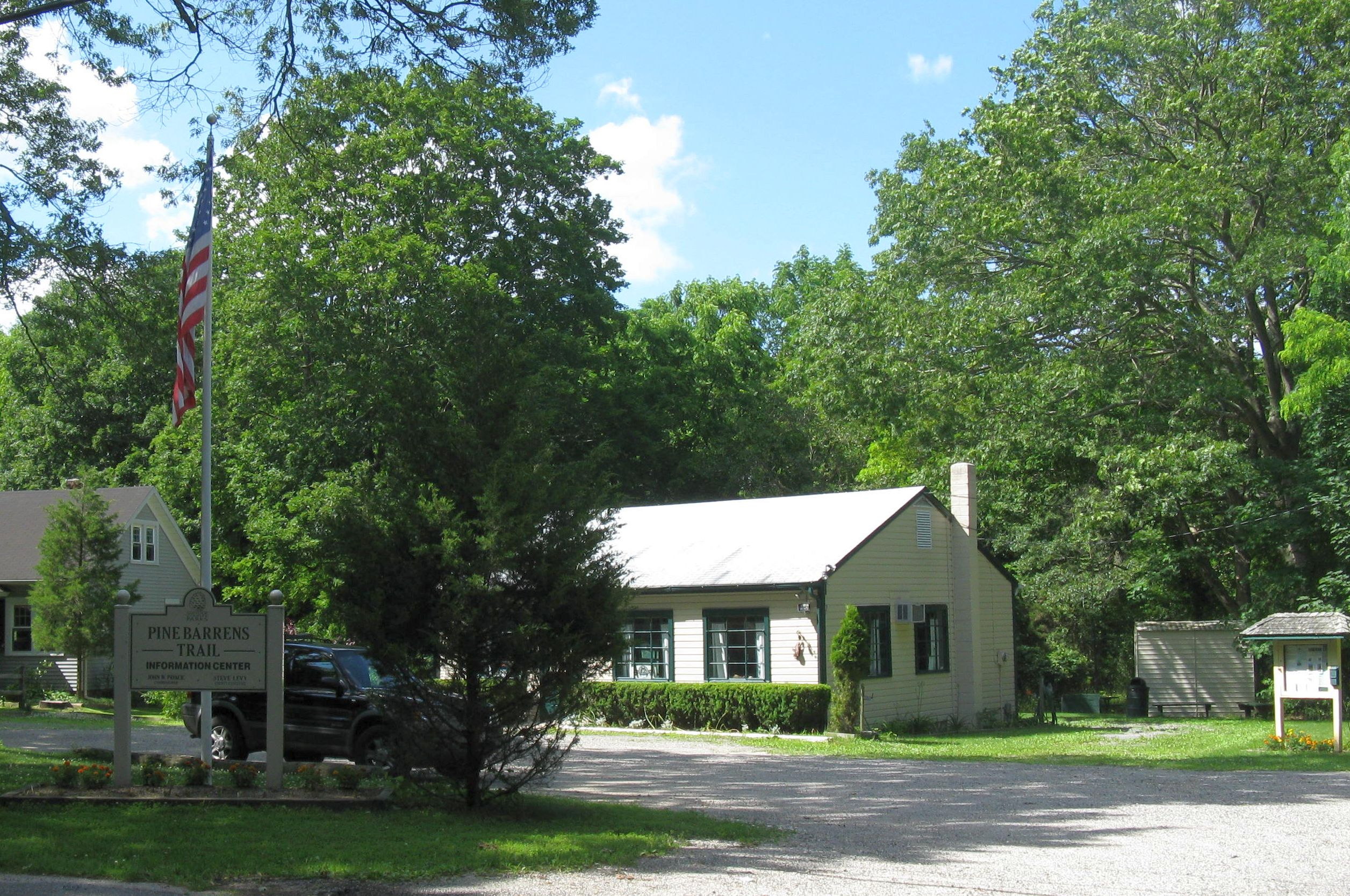
Long Island Pine Barrens Trail office in Manorville, New York

The Long Island Central Pine Barrens (also known as the Long Island Pine Barrens) is a large area of publicly protected pine barrens in Suffolk County, New York, on Long Island, covering more than 100,000 acres (405 km^{2}).

== Overview ==
The Barrens operates similarly to Adirondack Park, with public lands managed by a mix of federal, state, county and local public land managers intermixed with private inholdings.

It is Long Island's largest natural area and its last remaining wilderness. The region contains a remnant of the Atlantic coastal pine barrens ecoregion, whose forests might once have covered a quarter million acres (1,000 km^{2}) on Long Island.

The Central Pine Barrens overlays and recharges a portion of a federally designated sole source aquifer for Long Island's drinking water. All of Long Island's drinking water comes from ground water wells; none of the island's water comes from reservoirs. Almost all of the Peconic River and Carmans River (two of Long Island's four biggest rivers) as well as much of their watersheds are in the Barrens.

Two other large, contiguous examples of this ecosystem remain in the northeastern United States: the Massachusetts Coastal Pine Barrens and the New Jersey Pine Barrens.

== History ==
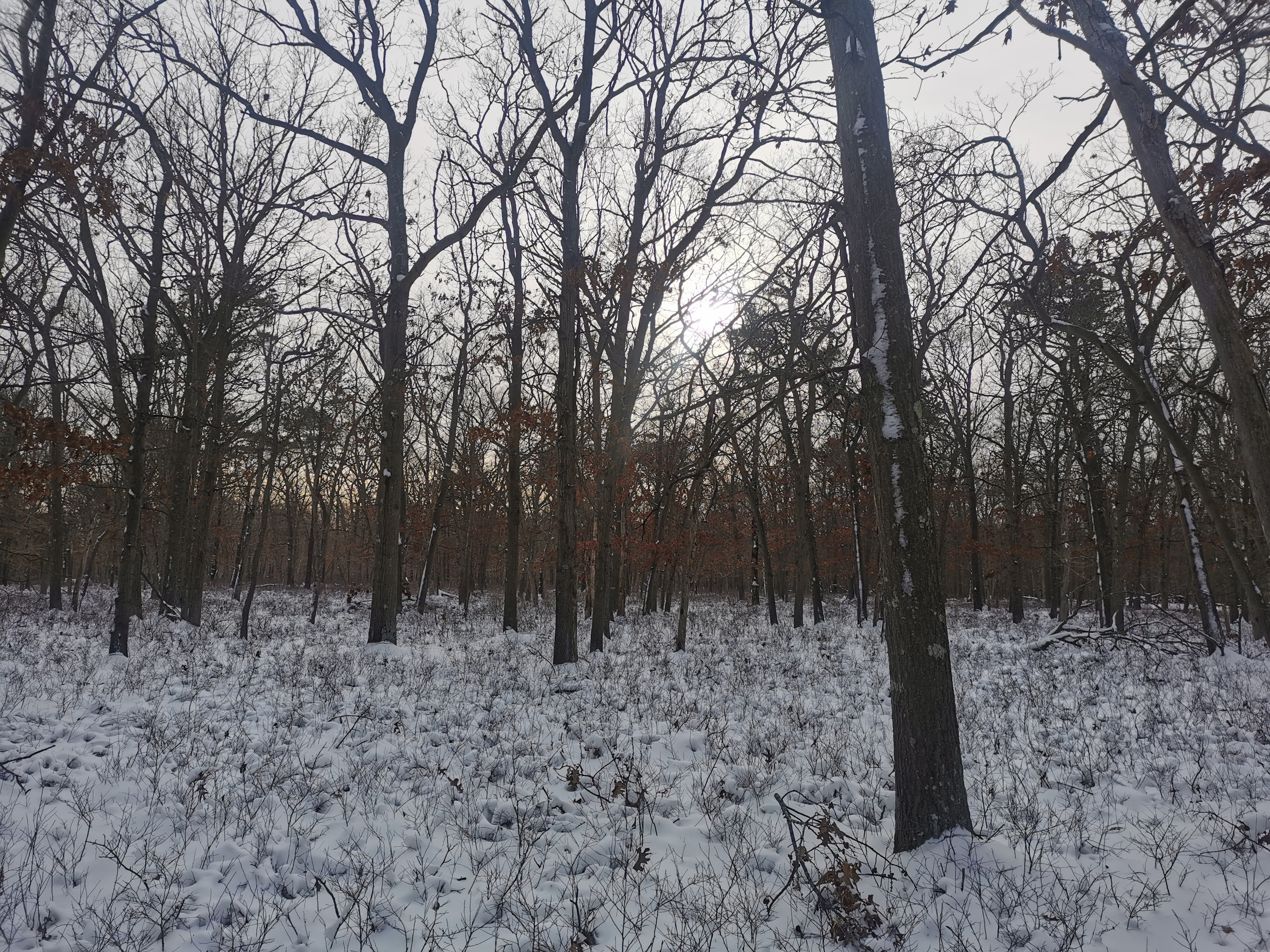
Pine Barrens in Rocky Point

In the 1970s the State of New York began acquiring large parcels to create a greenbelt. The federal government at Brookhaven National Laboratory transferred 2,300 acres (9 km^{2}) in 1971 and RCA transferred 7,200 acres (29 km^{2}) around Rocky Point in 1978 (for a cost of $1).

In 1984 the Pine Barrens Review Commission was created to review development in the region. In 1986 the Suffolk County Open Space Program financed by a 0.25% sales tax was to result in 28 new Suffolk County Parks in the region totalling 4,600 acres (19 km^{2})

Despite the efforts development pressure continued and in 1989 the Long Island Pine Barrens Society filed a multibillion-dollar suit against Suffolk County, and the towns of Brookhaven, Riverhead and Southampton. The Society eventually lost its suit in the New York's highest court—the New York Court of Appeals—after winning in earlier courts.

In 1993 the New York State Legislature approved the Long Island Pine Barrens Protection Act to protect the region through the development and implementation of a comprehensive land use plan. The act also created the Central Pine Barrens Joint Planning & Policy Commission to oversee the plan, and divided the area into two regions:

- A core 53,000 acres (214 km^{2}) area where no development is permitted at all. The area was expanded to 55,000 acres (223 km^{2}) in 1998 with the addition of Wertheim National Wildlife Refuge. Seventy-five percent of the land in the core area is to be acquired. A provision of the law allows private ownership in the core area provided there is a transfer of development rights arrangement where the owner can build elsewhere by transferring ownership of the core lands to a government entity.
- A Compatible Growth Area of 47,000 acres (190 km^{2}) where limited, environmentally compatible development is allowed.

The initial towns were Brookhaven, Riverhead, and Southampton. In 1998 East Hampton set aside a small portion of land for the Barrens and it was expanded to 1,000 acres (4.0 km^{2}) in 2007.

== Wildfires ==
=== Sunrise Wildfire of 1995 ===
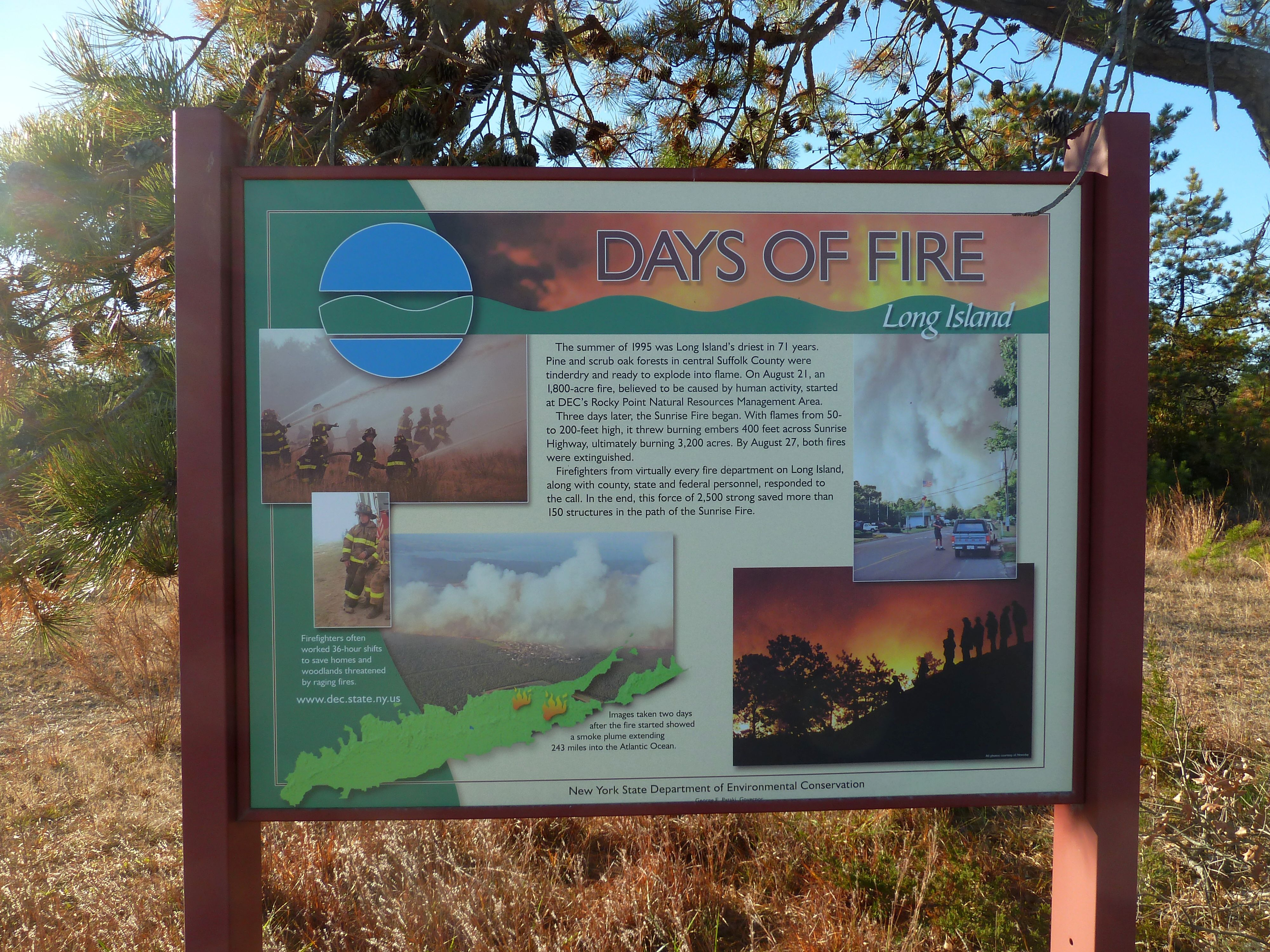
DEC sign commemorating the fire

In late August-early September 1995, a series of major brush fires swept through the pine barrens region. The first major fire incident occurred in Rocky Point, but was extinguished within days of its outbreak. A larger, more catastrophic fire erupted in the Westhampton area just shortly after the Rocky Point blaze was brought to an end. The fire, aided by high winds and dry conditions, quickly spread, threatening area homes and businesses. The fire was nicknamed the "Sunrise Wildfire", as it engulfed both sides of Sunrise Highway, the major highway connecting the Hamptons region with the rest of Long Island. The fires closed down the highway and stopped railroad service, effectively cutting the Hamptons off from the rest of the island for days as firefighters from all over Long Island, FDNY, and Connecticut worked around the clock to battle the blaze.

By early September, the Sunrise Wildfire was extinguished, but the results of that fire, in addition to the Rocky Point fire, were disastrous: Approximately 7,000 acres (28 km^{2}) had burned, numerous homes and small businesses suffered damage, and 400 people were forced to evacuate their homes. The fire, which erupted during the peak of the Hamptons' tourist season, resulted in a considerable economic blow for the region. However, the human toll was very light; a few firefighters suffered injuries, and nobody was killed in the event.

As of 2007, the region has mostly recovered from the damage it sustained, although some vegetation still bears the scars of the fire. Pine Barren ecosystems are highly adapted to fire and generally require periodic fires to maintain their unique vegetation and wildlife.

=== Brookhaven Blaze of 2012 ===
On April 9, 2012, several brushfires joined to ignite over 2,000 acres (8.1 km^{2}) of woodland around Manorville, Ridge and Brookhaven. By the end of the day, the fires were intense enough to cause a closure of parts of the Long Island Expressway. Parts of Riverhead were placed under mandatory evacuation.

The fire burned 1,124 acres (4.55 km^{2}) of pine lands. About 600 firefighters from about 109 departments battled the fire with 30 brush trucks, 20 tankers, and 100 engines. Airdrops of water were made by a New York State Police helicopter.

=== 2025 Brush fires ===
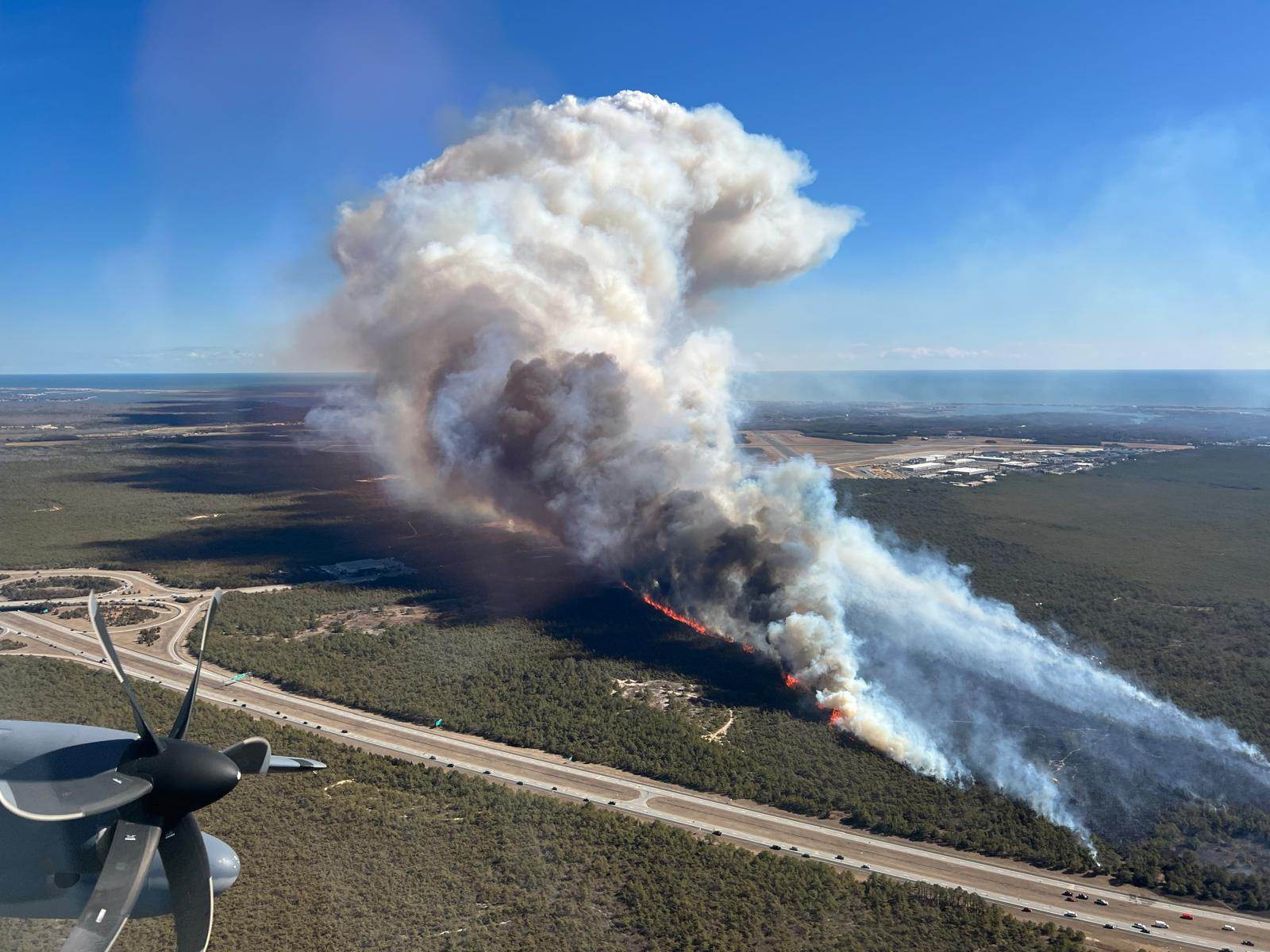
The Pine Barrens Fire, seen on March 8, 2025.

On March 8, 2025, multiple brush fires erupted in the Long Island Central Pine Barrens, prompting evacuations and emergency response efforts. The fires, fueled by dry conditions and strong winds, spread rapidly across the East End of Long Island, particularly affecting the Pine Barrens ecosystem.

Governor Kathy Hochul declared a state of emergency in response to the fires, mobilizing state resources and deploying the New York National Guard for aerial firefighting support. Over 40 fire departments from across the region collaborated to contain the blazes, which led to road closures, including sections of Sunrise Highway.

The fires posed a significant threat to residential areas and infrastructure, resulting in precautionary evacuations, including personnel at Francis S. Gabreski Airport. Officials closely monitored weather conditions as the situation developed, urging residents to follow evacuation orders and safety advisories.

Authorities cited the fire as a reminder of the region's vulnerability to wildfires, emphasizing the importance of fire prevention and forest management efforts in the Pine Barrens.

== Sister parks ==
The Central Pine Barrens Commission and the Migliarino-San Rossore-Massaciuccoli (MSRM) Regional Park in Tuscany, Italy are "twin parks" under a New York State program which supports such programs with the goal of sharing knowledge and experience between the citizens of both regions.

== See also ==
- Atlantic coastal pine barrens
- List of pine barrens
- Pine Barrens (New Jersey)
