= Pine barrens =

Type of ecoregion or plant community

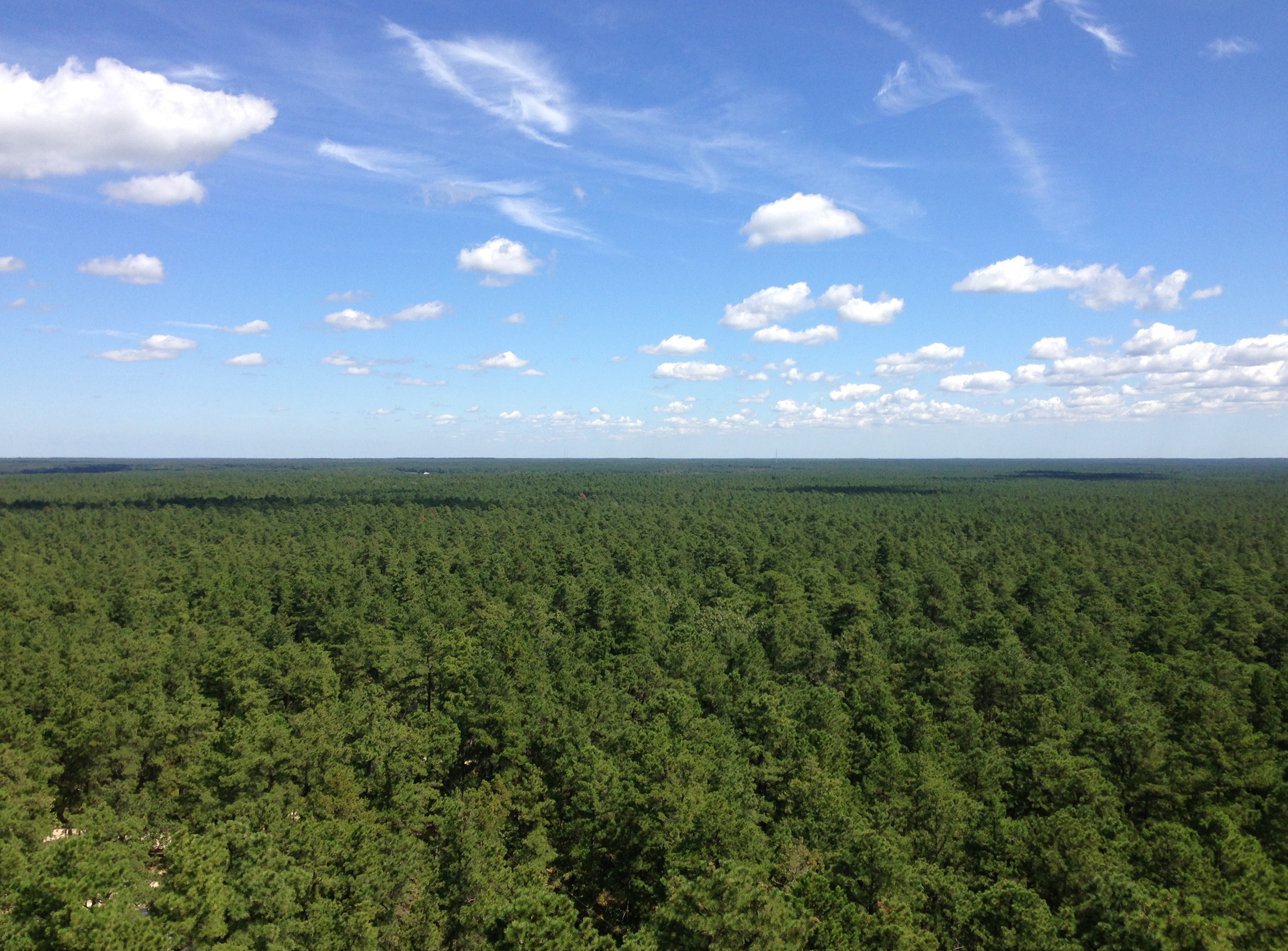
View north from a fire tower on Apple Pie Hill, the highest point in the New Jersey Pine Barrens

Pine barrens, pine plains, sand plains, or pineland areas occur throughout the U.S. from Florida to Maine (see Atlantic coastal pine barrens) as well as the Midwest, West, and Canada and parts of Eurasia. A well-known habitat to North Americans is the New Jersey Pine Barrens. Pine barrens are generally pine forests in otherwise "barren" and agriculturally challenging areas. Such pine forests often occur on dry, acidic, infertile soils, and also include grasses, forbs, and low shrubs. The most extensive pine barrens occur in large areas of sandy glacial deposits (including outwash plains), lakebeds, and outwash terraces along rivers.

== Description ==
=== Botany ===
The most common trees are the jack pine, red pine, pitch pine, blackjack oak, and scrub oak; a scattering of larger oaks is not unusual. The understory includes grasses, sedges, and forbs, many of them common in dry prairies, and rare plants such as the sand-plain gerardia (Agalinis acuta). Plants of the heath family, such as blueberries and bearberry, and shrubs, such as prairie willow and hazel, are common. These species have adaptations that permit them to survive or regenerate well after fire.

=== Fauna ===
Pine barrens support a number of rare species, including Lepidoptera such as the Karner blue butterfly (Plebejus melissa samuelis) and the barrens buck moth (Hemileuca maia). American black bears once roamed much of the area but were extirpated by hunting and trapping. They are slowly returning to the pine barrens, and can be seen occasionally.

=== Fire ecology ===
Native Americans used fire to maintain such areas as rangeland. Suppression of wildfires has allowed larger climax forest vegetation to take over in most one-time barrens. Barrens are dependent on fire to prevent invasion by less fire-tolerant species. In the absence of fire, barrens will proceed through successional stages from pine forest to a larger climax forest, such as oak-hickory forest. However, temperatures in a white pine forest on Long Island were high enough to destroy the pine cones which led to a slow recovery of the pine forest that varied depending on the availability of seedlings and the spatial variability in the conditions in the soil encountered by the seedlings.

== See also ==
- Atlantic coastal pine barrens
- Eastern savannas of the United States
- List of pine barrens
- Long Island Central Pine Barrens
- New Jersey Pine Barrens
- Plymouth Pinelands
- Sandhills (Carolina)
- Middle Volga Integrated Biosphere Reserve
- Serpentine barrens
- Pine savanna
