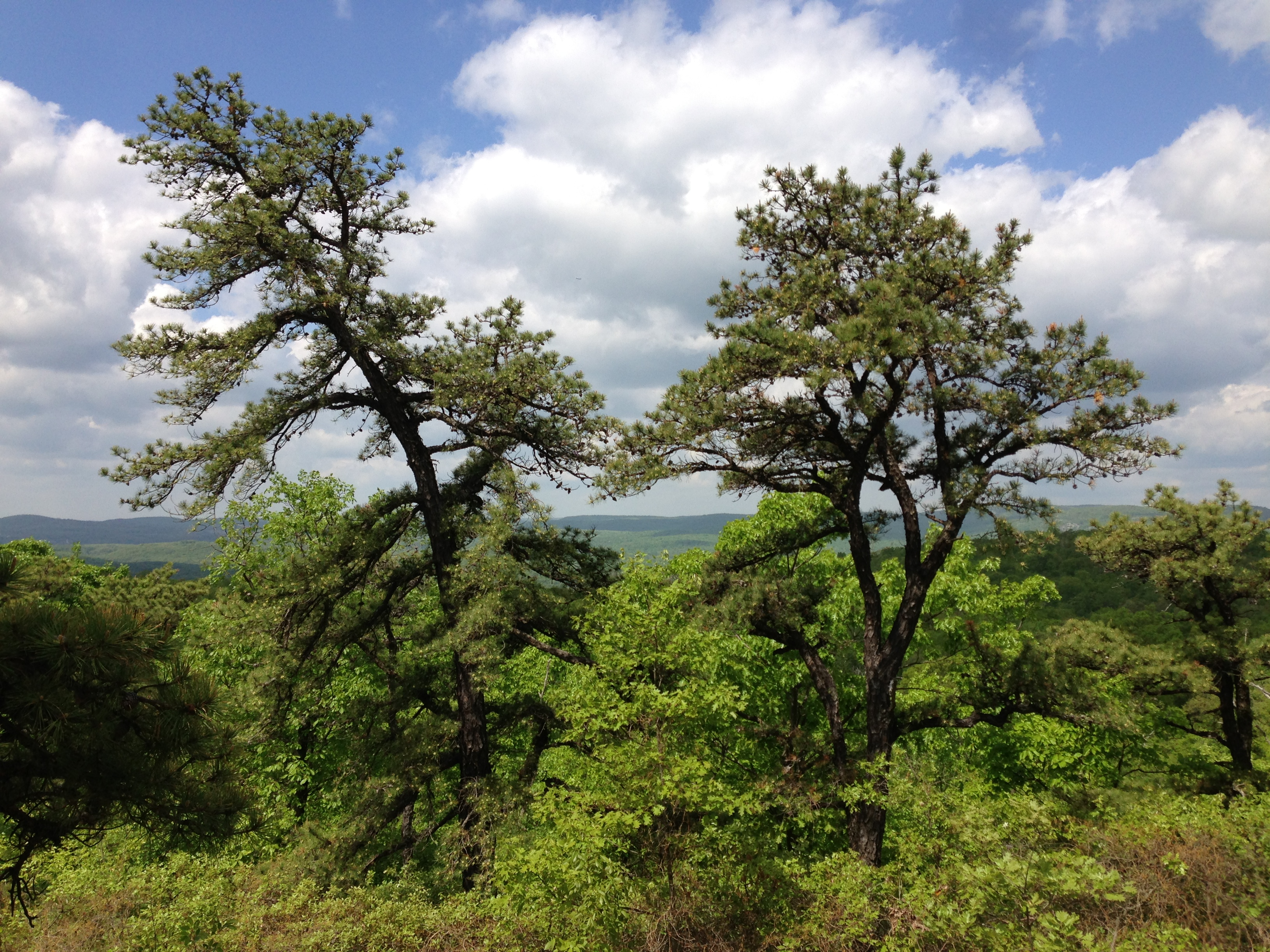

Conservation status
- Least Concern (IUCN 3.1)

Scientific classification
- Kingdom: Plantae
- Clade: Tracheophytes
- Clade: Gymnosperms
- Division: Pinophyta
- Class: Pinopsida
- Order: Pinales
- Family: Pinaceae
- Genus: Pinus
- Subgenus: P. subg. Pinus
- Section: P. sect. Trifoliae
- Subsection: P. subsect. Australes
- Species: P. rigida

Binomial name
- Pinus rigida Mill.
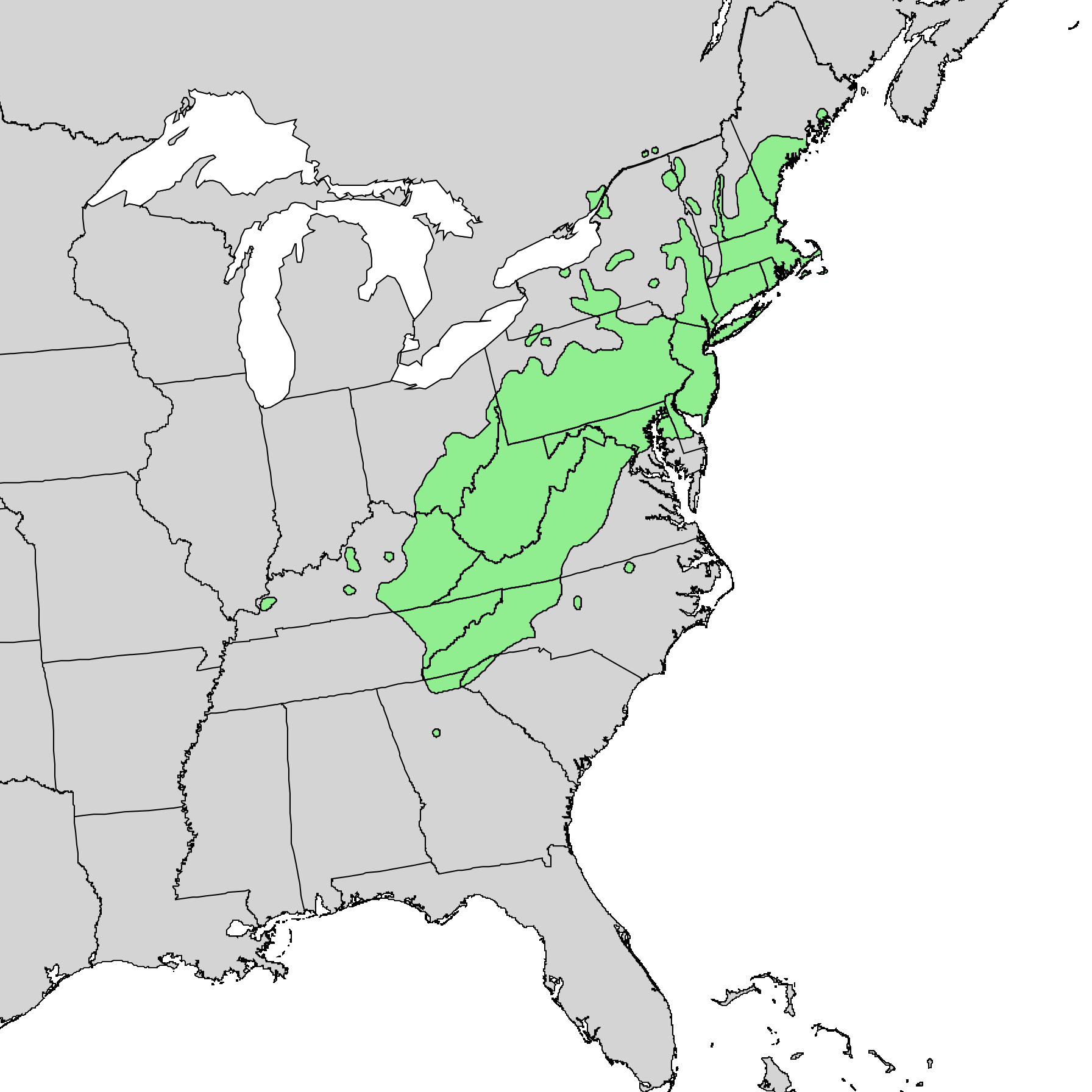

= Pinus rigida =

Pitch pine

Species of pine tree

Pinus rigida, the pitch pine, is a small-to-medium-sized conifer in the family Pinaceae. It is a pine native to eastern North America, primarily from central Maine south to Georgia and as far west as Kentucky. It is found in environments which other species would find unsuitable for growth, such as acidic, sandy, and low-nutrient soils.

== Description ==
The pitch pine is irregular in shape, but grows to 6–30 metres (20–98 ft). Branches are usually twisted, and it does a poor job at self-pruning. The needles are in fascicles (bundles) of three, about 6–13 centimetres (2 1/4–5 inches) in length, and are stout, with breadth over 1 millimetre (1/16 in), and often slightly twisted. The cones are 4–7 cm (1 1/2–2 3/4 in) long and oval, with prickles on the scales. Trunks are usually straight with a slight curve, covered in large, thick, irregular plates of bark. Pitch pine has a high regenerative ability; if the main trunk is cut or damaged by fire, it can re-sprout using epicormic shoots. This is one of its many adaptations to fire, which also include a thick bark to protect the sensitive cambium layer from heat. Burnt pitch pines often form stunted, twisted trees with multiple trunks as a result of the resprouting. This characteristic makes it a popular species for bonsai.

Pitch pine is rapid-growing when young, gaining around 30 cm (12 in) height per year under optimal conditions, until growth slows at 50–60 years. By 90 years of age, the amount of annual height gain is minimal. Open-growth trees begin bearing cones in as little as three years, with shade-inhabiting pines taking a few years longer. The cones take two years to mature. Seed dispersal occurs over the fall and winter, and trees cannot self-pollinate. The lifespan of a pitch pine is about 200 years or longer; the maximum recorded age is 398 years (as of January 2026).

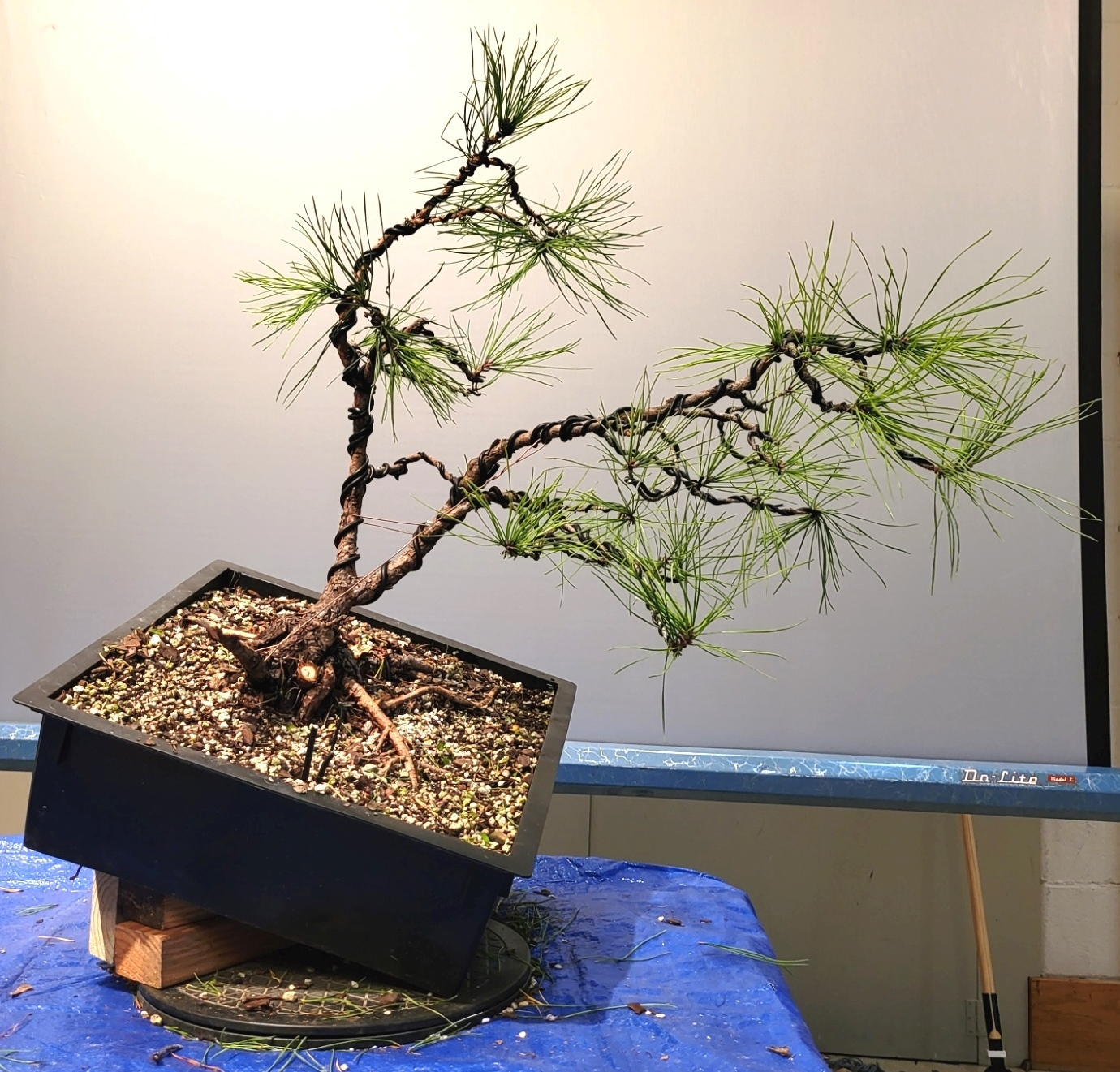
Pitch pine being trained as bonsai. This specimen was collected in the wild.

== Taxonomy ==
It was given its scientific name, Pinus rigida, by the British botanist Philip Miller. It belongs to the family Pinaceae and the subgenus Pinus, along with other hard pines.

== Distribution and habitat ==
Pitch pine is found mainly in the southern areas of the northeastern United States, from coastal Maine and Ohio to Kentucky and northern Georgia. A few stands occur in southern Quebec and Ontario, mostly in two pockets along the St. Lawrence River. It is known as a pioneer species and is often the first tree to vegetate a site after it has been cleared away. It is a climax vegetation type in extreme conditions, but in most cases it is replaced by oaks and other hardwoods. This pine occupies a variety of habitats, from dry, acidic sandy uplands to swampy lowlands, and can survive in very poor conditions. It is the primary tree of the Atlantic coastal pine barrens ecoregion.

== Hybrids ==
This species occasionally hybridizes with other pine species, such as loblolly pine (Pinus taeda), shortleaf pine (Pinus echinata), and pond pine (Pinus serotina); the last is treated as a subspecies of pitch pine by some botanists.

The pitlolly pine (Pinus × rigitaeda) is a natural hybrid with the loblolly pine which combines the tall size of the loblolly pine and the cold-hardiness of the pitch pine. This hybrid was used as substitute of loblolly pine and has been extensively planted in South Korea.

== Ecology ==
Pitch pines provide habitat and food for many wildlife species. They are used for cover and nesting by birds such as the pine warbler, wild turkey, red-cockaded woodpecker, great-crested flycatcher, blue jay, black-capped chickadee, black-and-white warbler, Nashville warbler, and chestnut-sided warbler. Deer consume seedlings and new sprouts, and small mammals and birds eat the seeds.

== Uses ==
Because it frequently grows multiple or crooked trunks, pitch pine is not a major timber tree, nor is it as fast-growing as other eastern American pines. However, it grows well on unfavorable sites. In the past, it was a major source of pitch and timber for ship building, mine timbers, and railroad ties because the wood's high resin content preserves it from decay. As such, it has also been used for elaborate wood constructions, e. g. radio towers.

Pitch pine is currently used mainly for rough construction, pulp, crating, and fuel. However, due to its uneven growth, quantities of high quality can be difficult to obtain, and long lengths of pitch pine can be very costly.

Archaeology indicates that the Haudenosaunee, Shinnecock, and Cherokee all utilized pitch pine. The Haudenosaunee used the pitch to treat rheumatism, burns, cuts, and boils. Pitch also worked as a laxative. A pitch pine poultice was used by both the Haudenosaunee and the Shinnecock to open boils and to treat abscesses. The Cherokee used pitch pine wood in canoe construction and for decorative carvings.

== Gallery ==
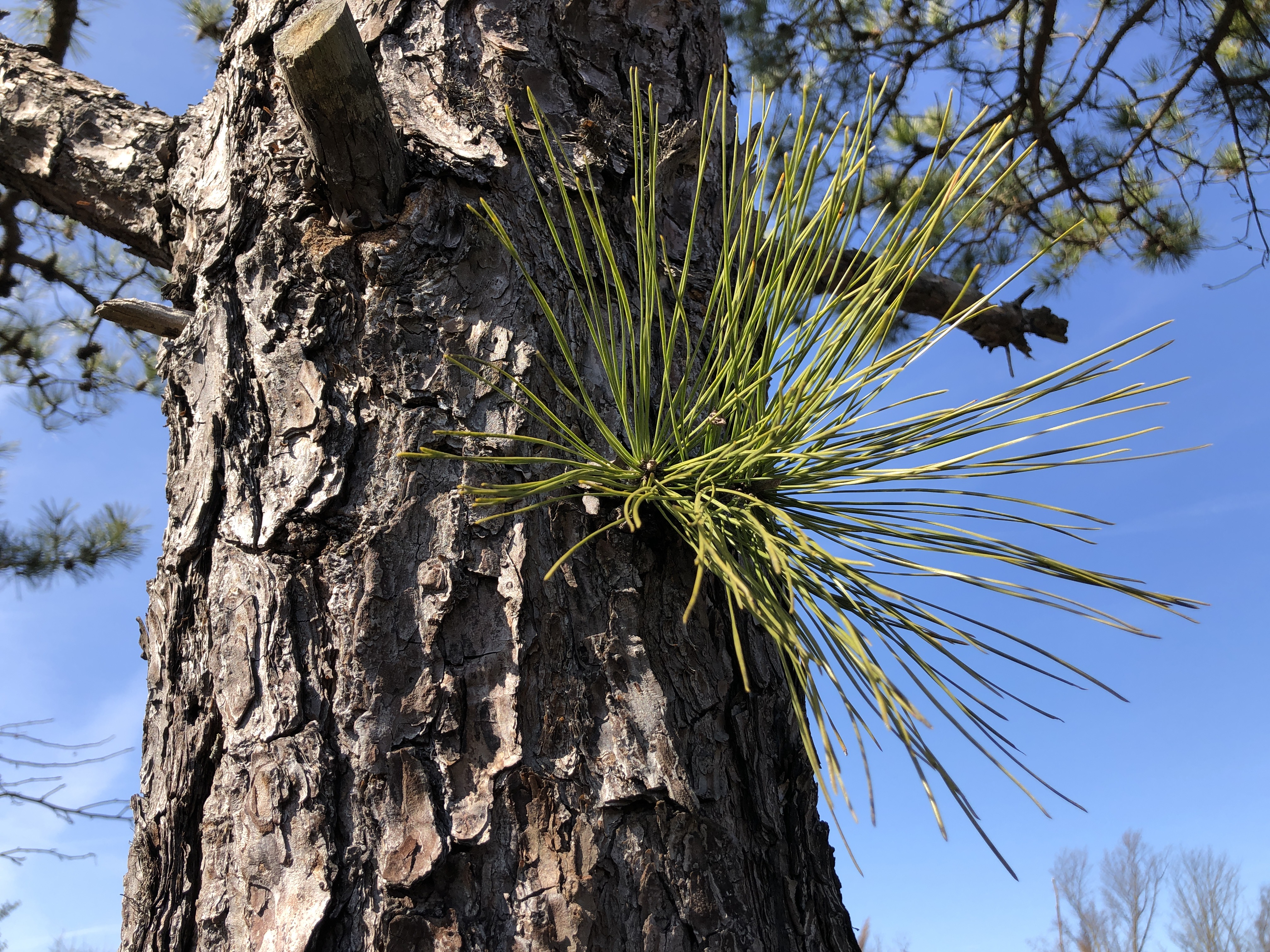
Bark and epicormic shoot, a defining characteristic of the species

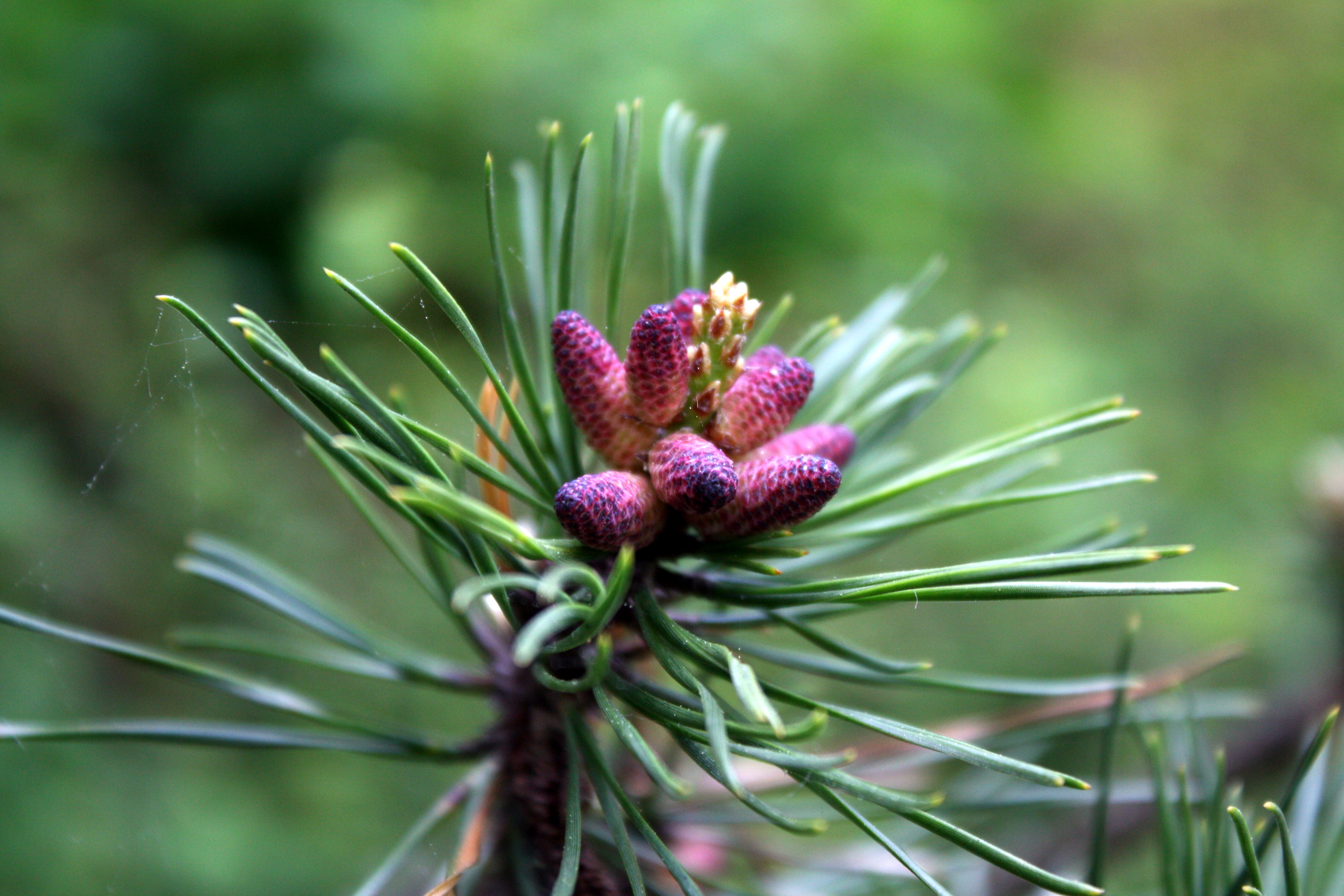
Pollen cones

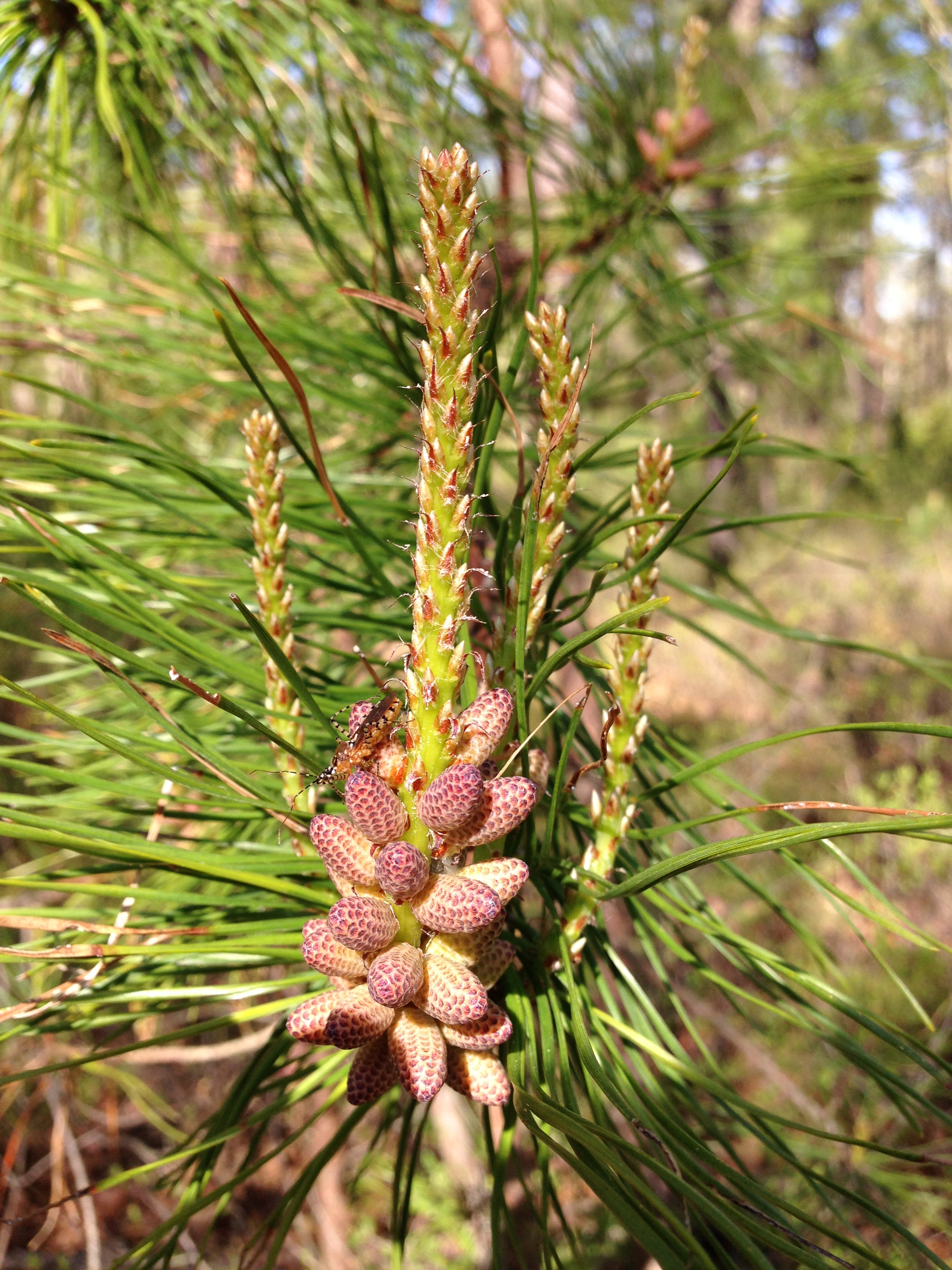
New growth and pollen cones

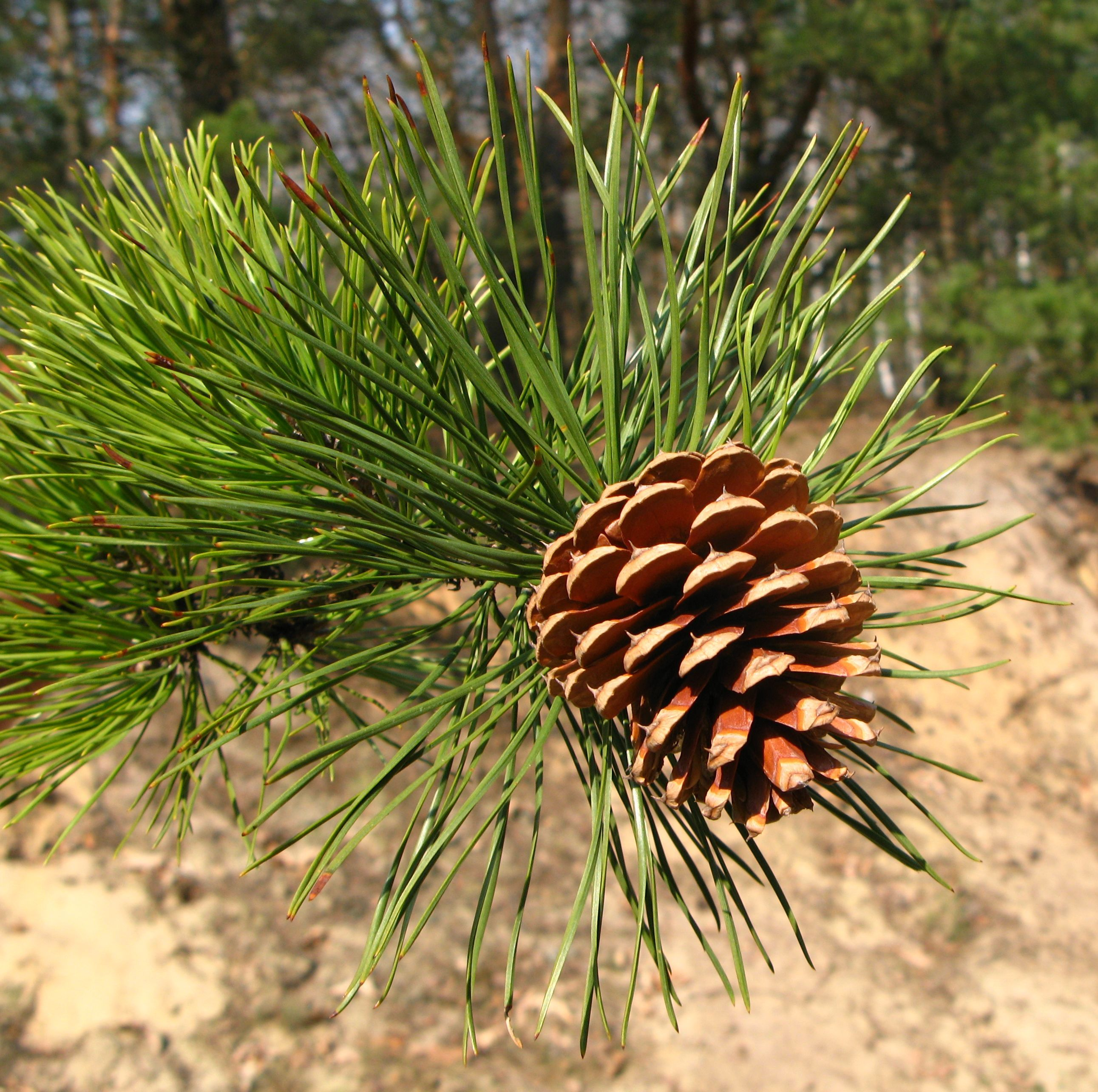
Cone and needles

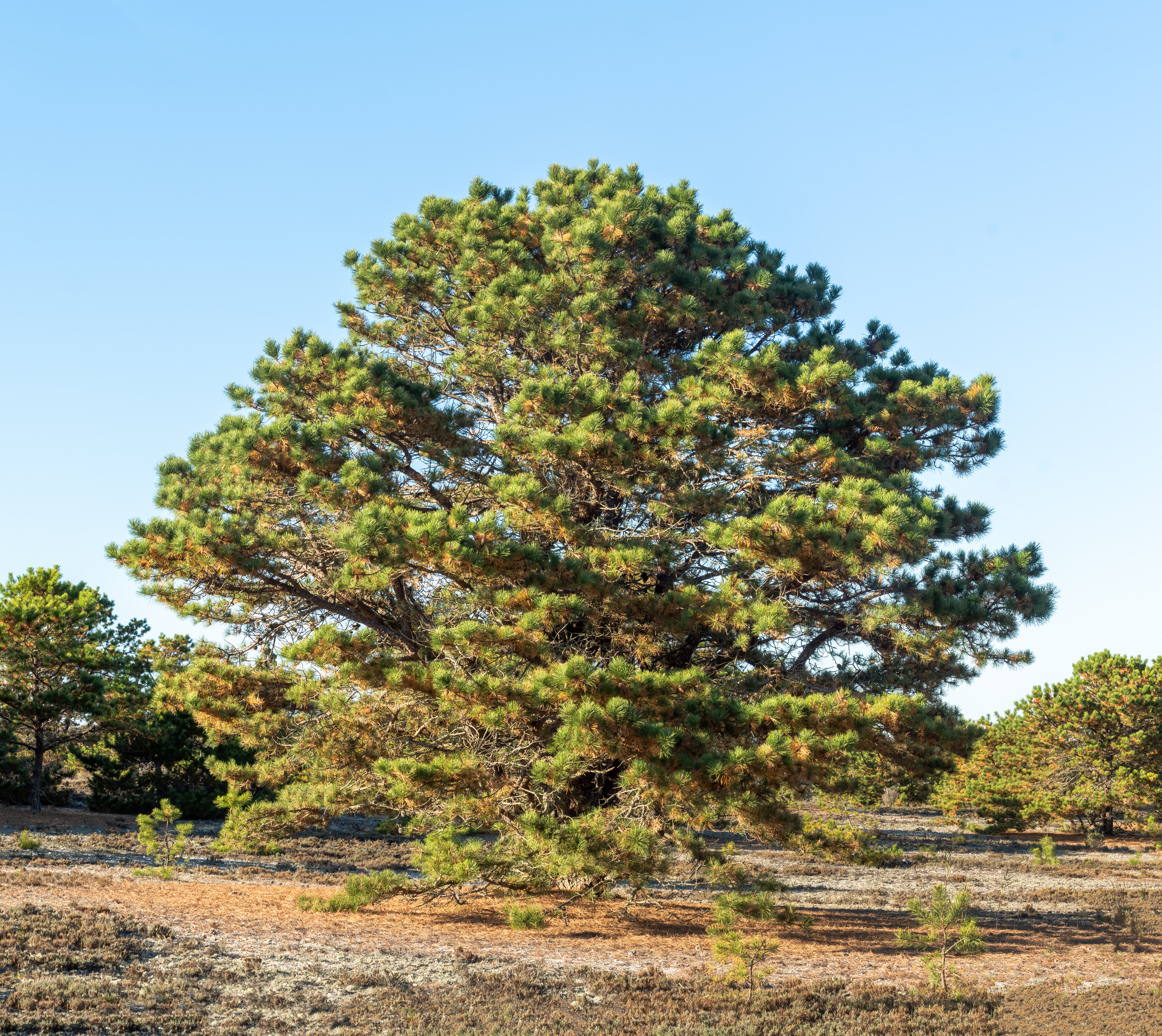
Pitch pine on Long Island in New York, United States

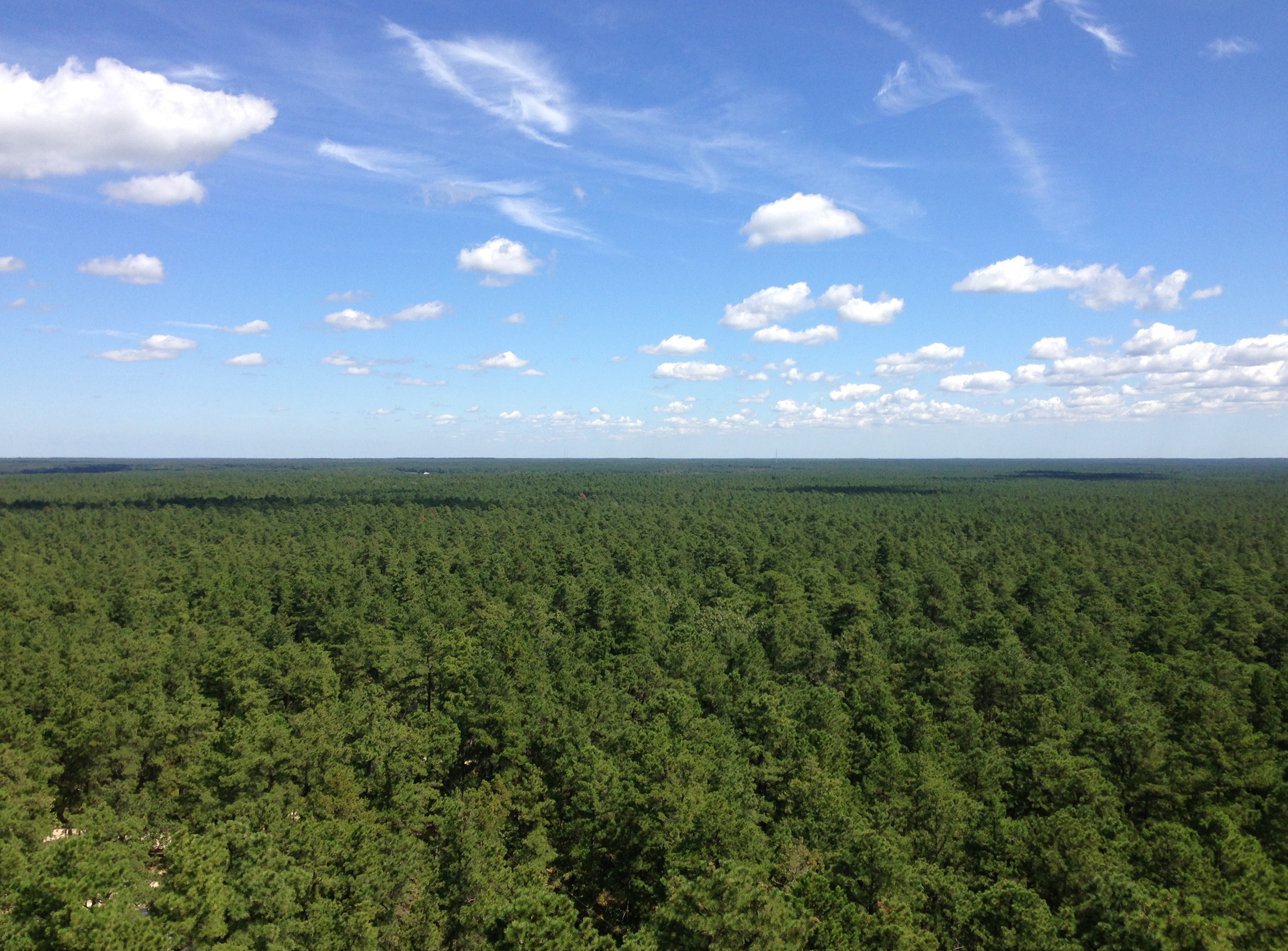
View north from a fire tower on Apple Pie Hill in the New Jersey Pine Barrens. The vast pine forest is almost entirely made up of Pinus rigida.

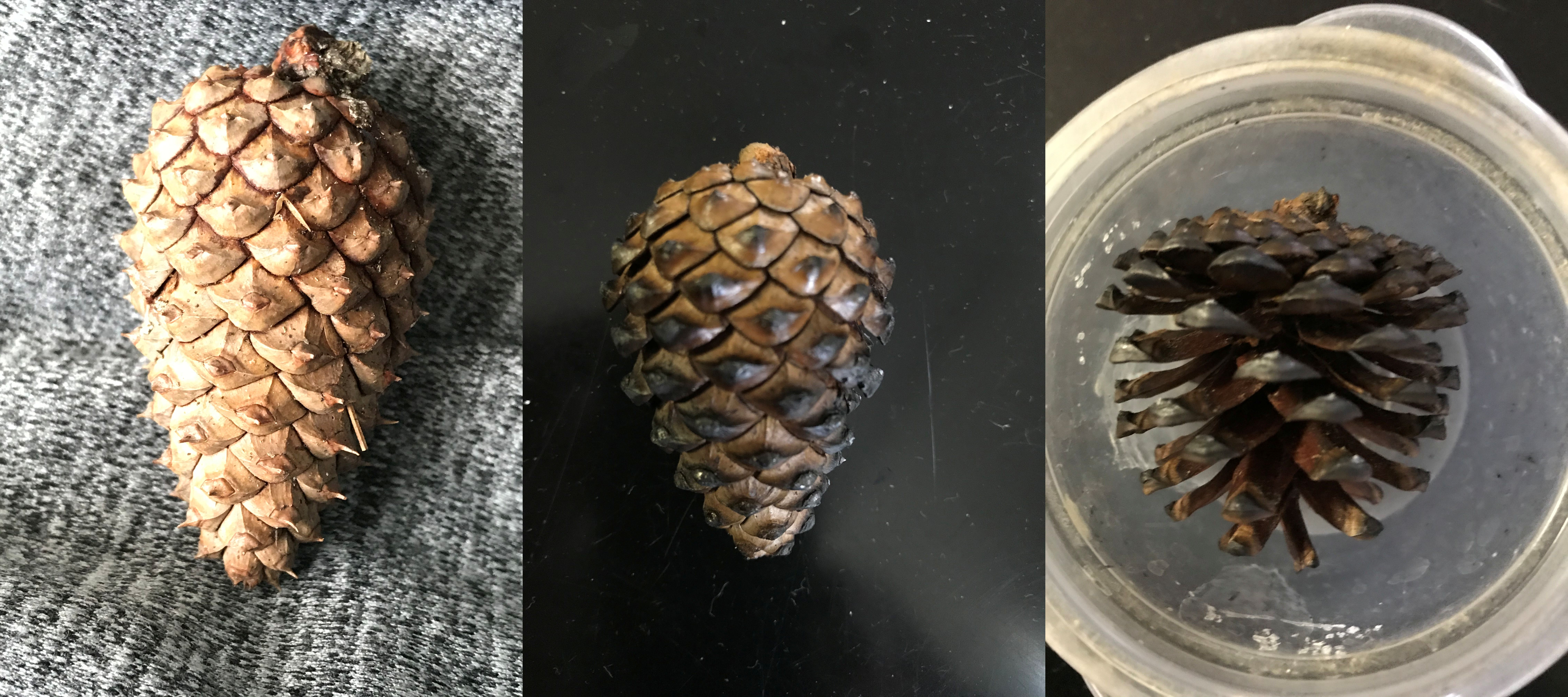
A pitch pine cone experimentally exposed to fire by Saint Michael's College scientists (Vermont, United States). The middle photograph shows the cone right after exposure to a bunsen burner flame. The right hand photograph was taken 24 hours later.

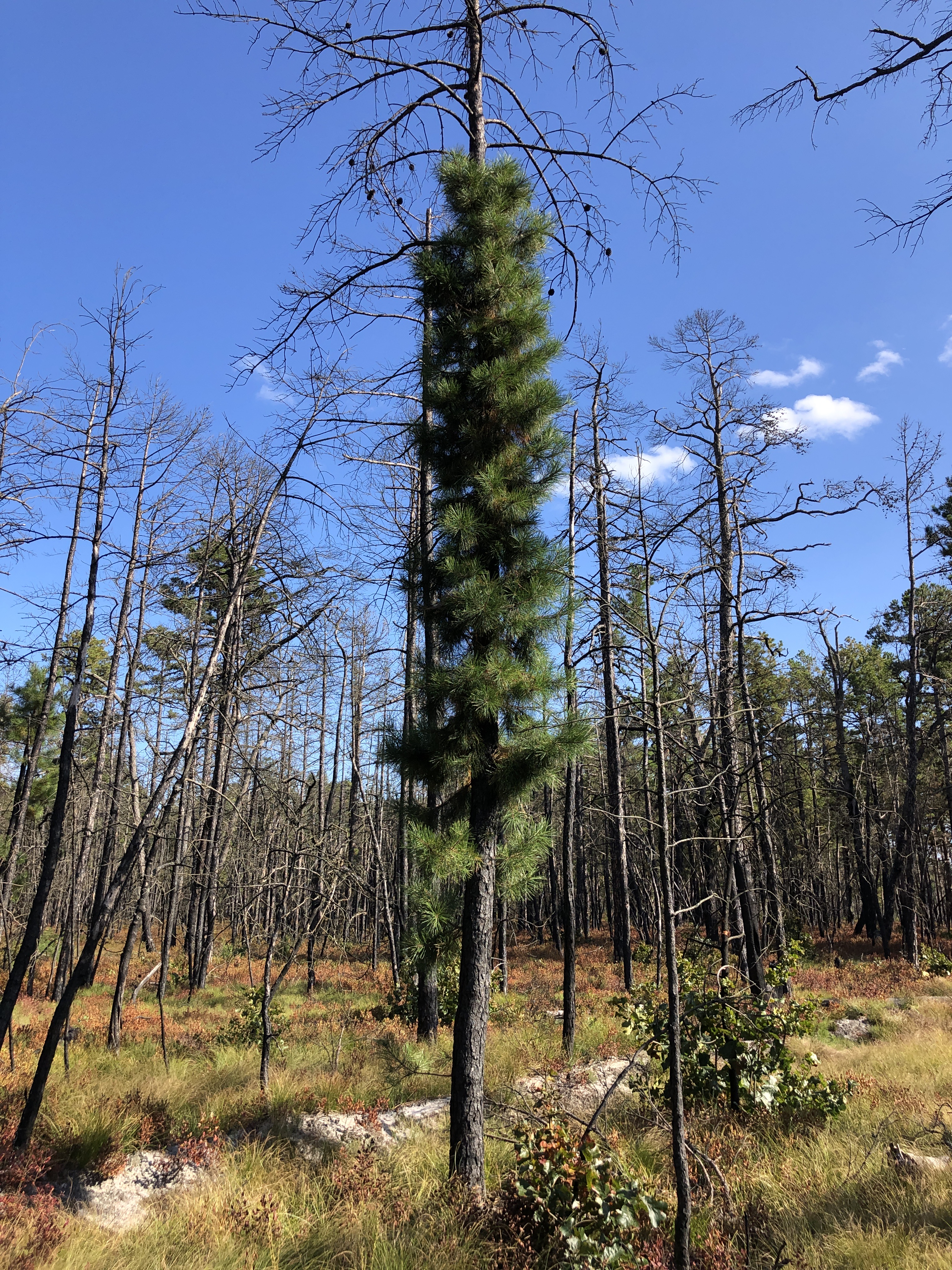
Pitch pine with heavy growth of epicormic shoots after a severe wildfire

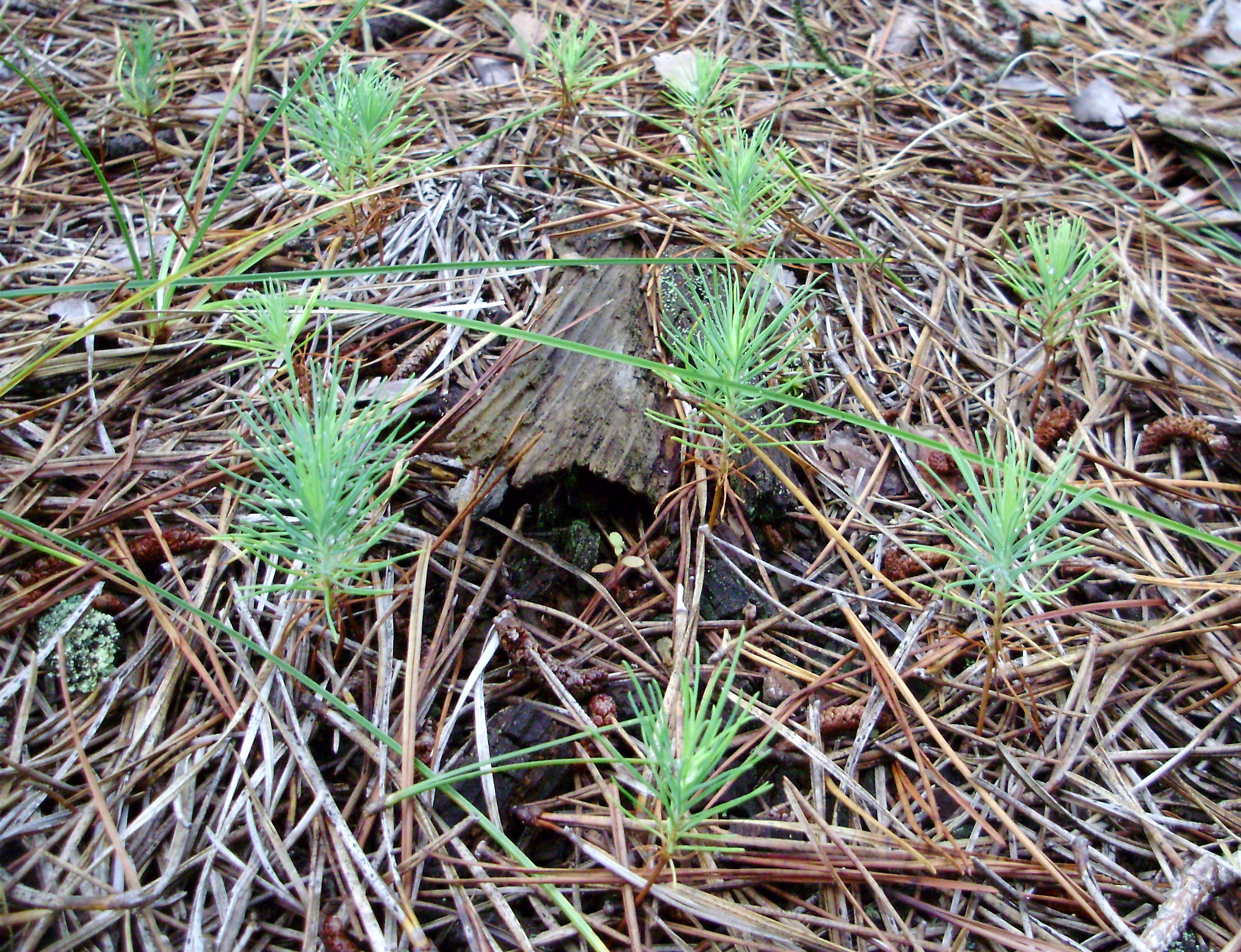
Seedlings
