= Bellevue, Schenectady, New York =

Bellevue City of Schenectady
- Neighborhood
- Location of Bellevue within the state of New York
- Coordinates: 42°47′51″N 73°57′51″W
- Country: United States
- State: New York
- Region: Capital District
- County: Schenectady County
- Annexed: 1903

Area
  - Total: 1.29 sq mi (3.3 km^{2})

Population (2000)
  - Total: 6,223
  - Density: 4,820/sq mi (1,860/km^{2})
- Time zone: UTC-5 (Eastern Standard Time)
  - Summer (DST): UTC-4 (Eastern Daylight Time)

Bellevue is a neighborhood in Schenectady, New York, United States. Within Bellevue is the General Electric (GE) Main Plant, built in 1886 and which was once home to the company headquarters from its formation in the late-19th century until moving to Connecticut in the mid-1970s. Historically many residents walked to work to the GE plant. Bellevue, along with neighboring Mont Pleasant, was annexed by the city of Schenectady in 1903 from the town of Rotterdam.

== Demographics ==
In 2000 Bellevue had a population of 6,223, which was a decrease of 5% from 1990. The largest decrease was by seniors (65+) at 19.1%, followed by pre-school children (0-4) at 7.3%, adults (20-64) at 1.1% decrease, and school-age children (5-19) decreased by 0.8%. The median age in Bellevue is 35.8.

There are 3,066 housing units in the neighborhood (a 2.1% increase from 1990–2000) with an average of 2.25 residents per household. 52.7% of the housing units are owner occupied while 47.3% are renter occupied. The percentage of owner-occupied housing has declined over that same decade however.

The median income for Bellevue was $31,939 in 2000. 69.2% of neighborhood residents were low/moderate income and 39.7% were very low income. Minorities comprise 9% of the residents.

== Geography ==
Bellevue occupies 826 acres (334 ha) in the western section of the city, and is the second largest neighborhood by acreage. To the east the CSX railroad line separates the neighborhood from the Mont Pleasant neighborhood. The town of Rotterdam surrounds the neighborhood to the north, west, and south. The Bellevue Bluffs separate the residential uplands from the lower GE Main Plant, the bluffs range between 50–100 feet above the plant.

== Land use ==
Of Bellevue's approximately 826 acres (334 ha) industrial properties account for 39.2% of all land use thanks to the presence of the General Electric plant along Bellevue's northern border; excluding the plant industrial use accounts for only 1% of the neighborhood's area. Though single-family housing is the next largest land use (192 acres (78 ha) or 23.2% of land area), there is no single-family zoning in Bellevue as there is in other Schenectady neighborhoods. This means that existing single-family housing can legally be converted to two-family at any time.

== Education ==
Bellevue is a part of the Schenectady City School District and the children attend Van Corlaer Elementary School in the community, and then go on to the Mont Pleasant Middle School and Schenectady High School.

77% of residents have a high school diploma and 11.4% have a bachelor's degree or higher.

== Recreation ==
Bellevue has two parks, Fairview and Hillhurst; Hillhurst is a 21-acre (8.5 ha) park with a pool, baseball field, and playground while Fairview has tennis courts and picnic tables.

== See also ==
- Union Street Historic District (Schenectady, New York)
- Stockade Historic District
- Woodlawn, Schenectady, New York
