= Albany Pine Bush =

Pine barren in Albany, New York

Albany Pine Bush Preserve
- IUCN category Ib (wilderness area)
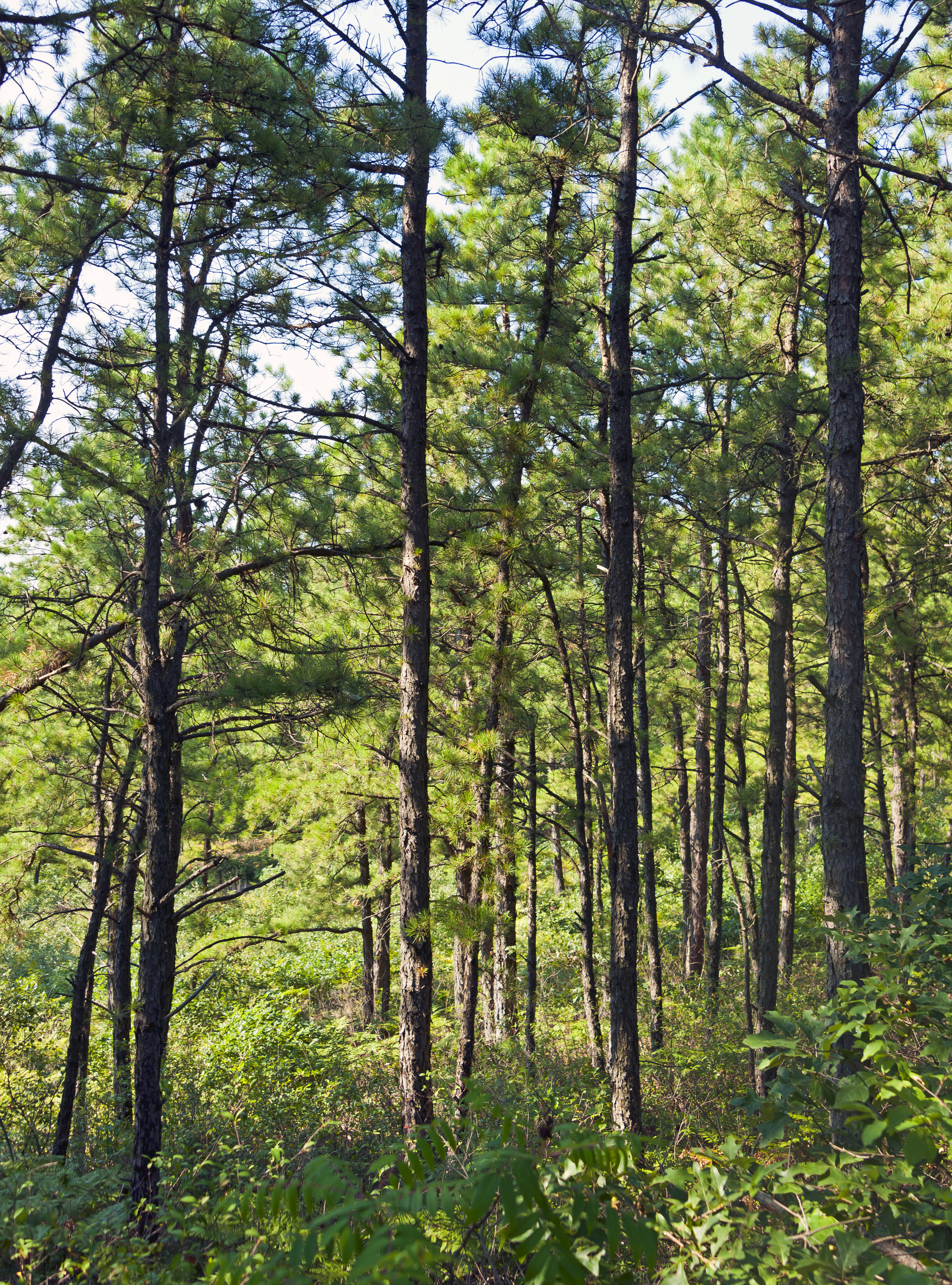
- Pines in the preserve

- Location within New York Location within the United States
- Location: Albany, Capital District, New York, United States
- Coordinates: 42°43′6″N 73°51′52″W
- Area: 5 sq mi (13 km^{2})
- Elevation: 320 ft (98 m)
- Established: 1988
- Named for: Dominance of landscape by pines and shrub oak
- Operator: New York State Department of Environmental Conservation
- Website: Albany Pine Bush Preserve Commission

The Albany Pine Bush, referred to locally as the Pine Bush, is one of the largest inland pine barrens in the world. It is centrally located in New York's Capital District within Albany and Schenectady counties, between the cities of Albany and Schenectady. The Albany Pine Bush was formed thousands of years ago, following the drainage of Glacial Lake Albany.

The Albany Pine Bush is the sole remaining undeveloped portion of a pine barrens that once covered over 40 square miles (100 km^{2}), and is "one of the best and last remaining examples of an inland pine barrens ecosystem on Earth". By 2008 it included all parcels of the Albany Pine Bush Preserve (a state nature preserve spanning 3,200 acres (1,300 ha)), the properties that connect these protected parcels, and some of the surrounding areas that abut the preserve. The 135-acre (55 ha) Woodlawn Preserve and surrounding areas in Schenectady County are the western sections of the Pine Bush, separated geographically by other properties from the Albany Pine Bush Preserve in Albany County.

Historically regarded by European settlers as desolate and dangerous to cross, the Pine Bush has come to be seen as a historical, cultural, and environmental asset to the Capital District and Hudson Valley regions of New York. It is home to the Karner blue butterfly, an endangered species first identified by author Vladimir Nabokov in 1944 using a type specimen from the Pine Bush. In 2014, Albany Pine Bush was designated as a National Natural Landmark by the National Park Service.

== History ==
=== European colonization ===
Around 10,000 years ago Native Americans moved into the Pine Bush area. When Europeans arrived in the early 17th century, two groups lived in the immediate area: the Mohawk nation of the Haudenosaunee to the west along the Mohawk River, and the Mohican to the east, along the Hudson River. The Dutch traded with both native groups from their outpost at Fort Orange (present-day Albany), which was established in 1624. For the natives the Pine Bush was an important source of firewood and animal pelts to trade with the Dutch. By 1640 the natives were having trouble finding enough animals in the Pine Bush to supply the growing European demand. The Mohawk referred to the settlement at Fort Orange as skahnéhtati, meaning "beyond the pine plains", referring to the large area of the Pine Bush between the Hudson and Mohawk rivers.

The Dutch granted a patent in 1661 under the name of Schenectady to a settlement on a bend in the Mohawk River to the west of the Pine Bush and about 20 miles from Fort Orange. To the settlers at Fort Orange, the settlement on the Mohawk River started by Arent van Curler was "beyond the pine plains", and therefore the name Schenectady (in various spellings) became associated with the village at that site. In 1664, the Dutch surrendered their entire colony of New Netherland, including Albany and Schenectady, to the English.

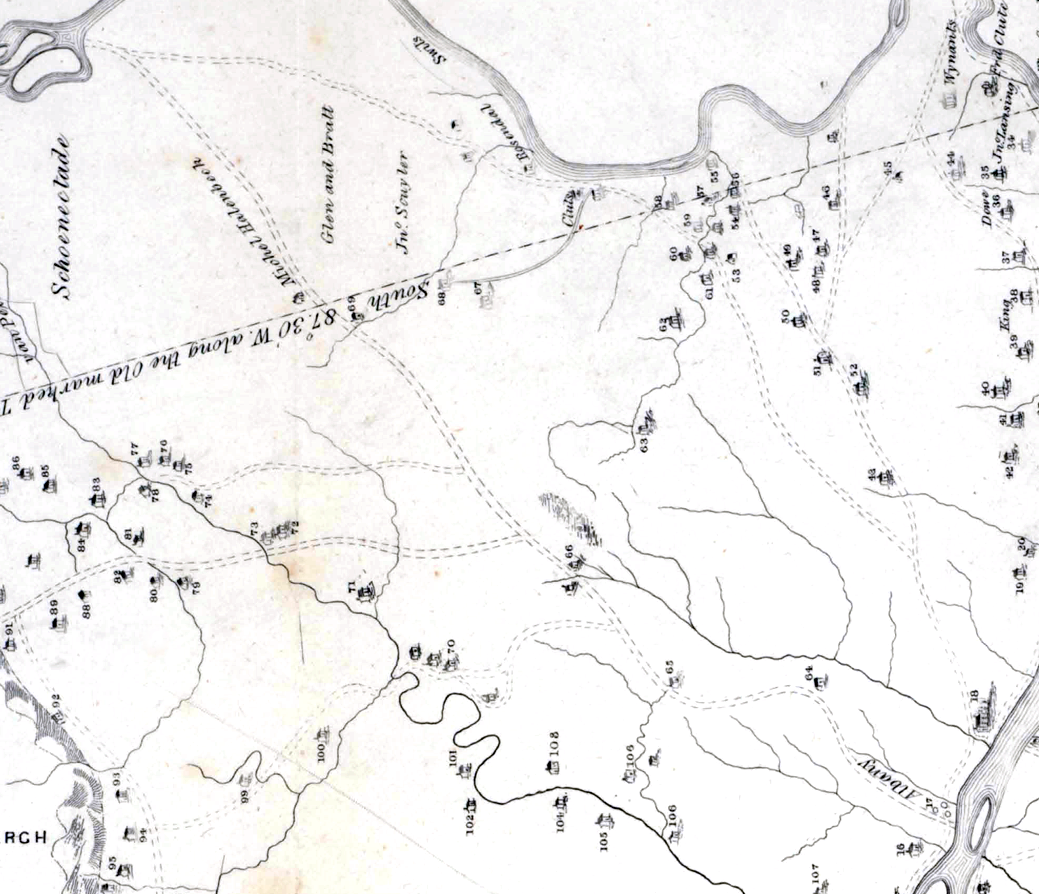
Map of the King's Highway from Albany (lower right) through the Pine Bush to Schenectady (upper left) in 1767.

What became known as the King's Highway were a series of footpaths which the Mohawk had long used to get from west in the valley through the Pine Bush to trade with other tribes at the confluence of the Hudson and Mohawk rivers. This area was later the site of the Dutch Fort Orange. After the founding of Schenectady, the name was used for what became a major route between the two settlements but, until the mid-18th century, it was not improved beyond a footpath. During the war from 1699 to 1707, Albany residents collected firewood from the Pine Bush for the large army that was camped at Fort Frederick.

In 1710, Germans immigrated from Palatine to the Albany area. To pay off the cost of their passage some were sent to work camps in the Pine Bush to harvest pines for pitch and rosin for the construction of English naval vessels. Some of these immigrants named the Helderberg Escarpment and settled Schoharie County. Others, largely from work camps in Dutchess County along the Hudson River, settled further west in the valley in 1723, past Little Falls on the Burnetsfield Patent.

During the French and Indian Wars, the British military improved the road significantly for use by its forces. After the war it was used by numerous settlers moving west into the Mohawk Valley. During the late-18th century, taverns and the occasional homesteader began to dot the Pine Bush along the King's Highway, while development began to encroach on the Pine Bush at the Albany and Schenectady edges as those settlements began to grow. The highway and the Pine Bush was a frontier wilderness and extremely dangerous even after the end of the war. Starting in 1765, militiamen took turns escorting travelers through the area to protect them from outlaws, bandits, smugglers, and other dangers. During the American Revolutionary War, the Bush was home to Loyalists of the British Crown. Among the taverns established in the 1760s catering to Pine Bush travelers was the Truax Tavern owned by Isaac Truax, a descendant of French Huguenots and a Tory sympathizer; he said that he was "not a Tory, but a man for the King". Rumors circulated of several murders/robberies being carried out at the tavern.

Travel became easier in 1793 following the revolution, when a stage coach began carrying passengers between the two cities and through the Pine Bush for three cents per mile.

=== 19th century ===
The 19th century saw great improvements in modes of transportation for traveling through the Pine Bush with better roads and soon thereafter railroads. Beginning in 1799 the Great Western Turnpike (today's US Route 20) and the Albany-Schenectady Turnpike (New York Route 5) were built through the Pine Bush. The Western Turnpike connected Albany west across the state to the American Midwest, while the Albany-Schenectady Turnpike replaced the King's Highway to Schenectady. The Mohawk and Hudson Railroad was chartered in 1826 in order to reduce travel time between Schenectady and Albany via the Erie Canal; it was the first railroad in the state of New York, and the fourth in the United States. On July 2, 1830, the DeWitt Clinton pulled the first passenger train in the United States, traveling over the 16-mile (26 km) route through the heart of the Pine Bush.

Over time, the turnpikes and railroad opened up parts of the Pine Bush to settlement, farming, and land speculation. One of the earliest residents was Theophillus Roessle, who owned a large farm and manor in what is now the hamlet of Roessleville, just outside Albany in the town of Colonie. He claimed that the sandy soil of the Pine Bush was "the best land for fruits in the world". Further west, part of the Pine Bush was carved up in 1858 into 860 plots as part of what is now known as the "Great Land Swindle" and sold to buyers outside the region. When they came to inspect their land, they thought the barrens were useless for agriculture; they tried to recoup their money by selling the land to other unsuspecting outsiders.

As in the colonial period, the Pine Bush continued to be tapped for its natural resources, with water becoming a target for development. The Patroon Creek, roughly where three feeder streams joined in the heart of the Pine Bush along Albany's northern border, was dammed in 1850 to form Rensselaer Lake waterworks.

In 1871, the northwestern portion of Albany west of Magazine Street, consisting of mostly undeveloped Pine Bush, was annexed to the neighboring Town of Guilderland after the Town of Watervliet refused it.

Portions of this territory were ceded to Albany in 1910 established its current border. A telling perspective of how it was viewed at the time is contained in the enabling law (Chapter 375 of the Laws of New York, 1910), which described the Pine Bush as "being a territory lying to the west of the present boundary line of the city and which is in large part waste and unoccupied land, the ownership of which is uncertain". This law authorized Albany to lay out the newly annexed territory into lots and acquire land for a park system to connect the Rensselaer Lake waterworks property to the old city border.

=== 20th century ===
As part of the Great Migration of African Americans out of the rural South to industrial cities in the early 20th century, the Reverend Louis W. Parson and his wife migrated in 1927 from Mississippi to Albany, where he founded the First Church of God in Christ. In four trips to Mississippi, Parson encouraged friends and family to move to Albany and join the church, which many did during the 1930s and 1940s. The reverend felt that the mores of Albany's South End, where they originally settled, was not conducive to religious life. He started a community in the Pine Bush along Rapp Road, purchasing two 14-acre (5.7 ha) undeveloped properties in 1930 and 1933. It is a rare example of a chain migration community surviving from the Great Migration. This narrow entity is today designated as the Rapp Road Community Historic District, listed on both the state and the National Register of Historic Places.

In 1912, the city of Albany commissioned a study by notable architect Arnold W. Brunner and landscape architect Charles Downing Lay for beautification of the city; it was published as Studies for Albany. Brunner and Lay proposed using the Rensselaer Lake waterworks property as the core of a new 1,000-acre (400 ha) natural park, preferably leaving much of the grounds in their natural state; "[i]n fact the less done to it the better". The city never acquired more land for a park here, and portions of the original waterworks property were sold off piecemeal and developed over the following century.

In the 1950s, the New York State Thruway (Interstate 90) was built through the Pine Bush, disrupting habitat and ecology. Further development took place in the 1950s and 60s with the construction of the W. Averell Harriman State Office Building Campus and the SUNY Albany uptown campus. In the 21st century, the remaining Pine Bush represents only about 10% of the undeveloped land that existed prior to 1950.

In the 1960s, longtime Mayor Erastus Corning 2nd pushed forward the Washington Avenue Extension, a four-lane divided highway extending Washington Avenue westward from Fuller Road through the Pine Bush to New Karner Road (NY Route 155). This opened the heart of the Pine Bush and the western section of the city to development and has been described as "a knife through the heart of the Pine Bush". Soon afterward, Neil Hellman, a race horse magnate and major developer in the city, proposed a huge "city within a city" on 390 acres (160 ha) that would have apartments, stores, an office park, one or two schools, and fire and police stations. Mayor Corning estimated between 10,000 and 15,000 persons would live there. Environmentalists and neighborhood groups fought and ultimately defeated this proposal.

Mayor Corning gave archaeologist Don Rittner a $500 donation in 1972 to excavate the Truax Tavern along the King's Highway. Rittner disproved the prevailing historical beliefs concerning the sophistication and structure of the tavern. He discovered several skeletons under the tavern's floor, which may confirm rumors of murders having taken place at the tavern. As a result of this project, Rittner was appointed as Albany's first municipal archaeologist, possibly the first of such a position in the nation.

While Mayor Corning supported the largest purchases of Pine Bush land as a city preserve, he also approved placing the Albany landfill in the Pine Bush, the construction of the Washington Avenue Extension, and authorizing much of the development that occurred during his 42 years in office as mayor. These all had adverse environmental effects on the Bush. In 1967, a portion of Albany's waterworks/Pine Bush property in the town of Colonie along Central Avenue was sold to developers who built the Northway Mall. Two years later the city moved its dump to the Pine Bush. The Dunes, a single-family housing development in the middle of the Pine Bush off the Washington Avenue Extension, was built in the mid-1970s.

In response to these developments, concerned citizens worried about the future of the habitat formed Save the Pine Bush in 1978. The organization filed lawsuits for the next several decades to stop further developments in the barrens. The activist group opposed construction of Crossgates Mall in the town of Guilderland. First proposed in 1978, it was finished in 1984, then expanded to doubled to 1.5 million square feet in 1994, becoming the third-largest mall in New York. Widespread regional opposition rose against plans in the late 1990s to more than double the mall againwith more than 2 million additional square feet of retail space, plus a 12-story hotel, and activities such as bowling, ice skating, miniature golf and soccer; the project was finally dropped in 1999.

In 1985, a bill to establish a state-controlled preserve to protect Pine Bush lands never made it out of committee. The bill was proposed the following year by Assemblyman Robert Connor (D)-New City. Among the local politicians who opposed the bill was Albany Mayor Thomas Whalen III, who sparred with Assemblyman Connors in a series of letters. Connors stated, "if the mayor allows the final destruction of the Pine Bush, the city of Albany will be an ancient archaeological ruin before the pine barren is replaced". Assemblyman Arnold Proskin (R)-Colonie, whose district included portions of the proposed preserve, opposed on the grounds that the bill was creating another state agency (like the Adirondack Park Agency) that would wrest control from local communities over their development.

The legislature established the Albany Pine Bush Preserve Commission in 1988. Its members consist of representatives of the New York State Department of Environmental Conservation, the New York State Office of Parks, Recreation and Historic Preservation, The Nature Conservancy, the towns of Colonie and Guilderland, and the city of Albany, Albany County; and four private citizens appointed by the governor. In 2001, the State Employees Federal Credit Union (SEFCU) donated their bank branch on New Karner Road to the state, following the discovery of an underlying issue with the title. The bank branch was adapted for use as the Albany Pine Bush Discovery Center.

Located since 1969 in the Pine Bush, the Albany landfill has been expanded several times, the latest by 15 acres (6.1 ha) in 2010. As of 2010, the landfill is expected to have seven years of operating life remaining. Fees paid by other jurisdictions and businesses enable the landfill to generate $4–5 million annually to the Albany budget; city residents are provided with free trash collection. The city committed to spending $18 million to restore Pine Bush habitat in exchange for gaining approval of the 2010 expansion.

In 1969, when Albany opened its landfill, the city of Schenectady set aside its only patch of Pine Bush as the Woodlawn Preserve, designating the 135-acre (55 ha) as a forever wild preserve. Since then, numerous developers have approached the city with proposals for development. In 2009 Schenectady County acted to protect as parkland 24 acres (9.7 ha) in the neighboring town of Niskayuna; this is part of the Woodlawn Pine Barrens–Wetlands Complex which borders the Woodlawn Preserve. The county deeded this property to the town. This action complemented larger plans to connect the complex to the larger Pine Bush Preserve in Albany County

== Albany Pine Bush Discovery Center ==
The Albany Pine Bush Discovery Center is a nature center in Albany, New York with exhibits and activities about the Albany Pine Bush Preserve's natural history, geologic and cultural significance. The center offers public programs such as teaching programs for school groups, guided hikes, lectures and after school programs, all of which are led by Pine Bush staff. Additionally, Pine Bush Discovery Center staff lead events like invasive species removal programs to allow community members to participating in maintaining the Pine Bush. The Pine Bush Discovery Center also encourages citizen science by running programs such as ant collection, where participants can collect and identify ants, providing data for Pine Bush staff to monitor their conservation efforts. It occupies a former SEFCU credit union bank branch on New Karner Road.

== Geography ==
The Pine Bush is within the Hudson Valley section of the Appalachian Valley and Ridge Province in the state of New York, and occupies parts of the city of Albany and the towns of Colonie and Guilderland within Albany County, as well as parts of Schenectady County to the west . The Pine Bush includes not only pine barrens, but also grasslands of prairie grasses, northern and southern successional forests, and numerous ravines with some wetlands. The Pine Bush ranges in elevation from 260 feet (79 m) to 360 feet (110 m) above sea level.

== Geology ==
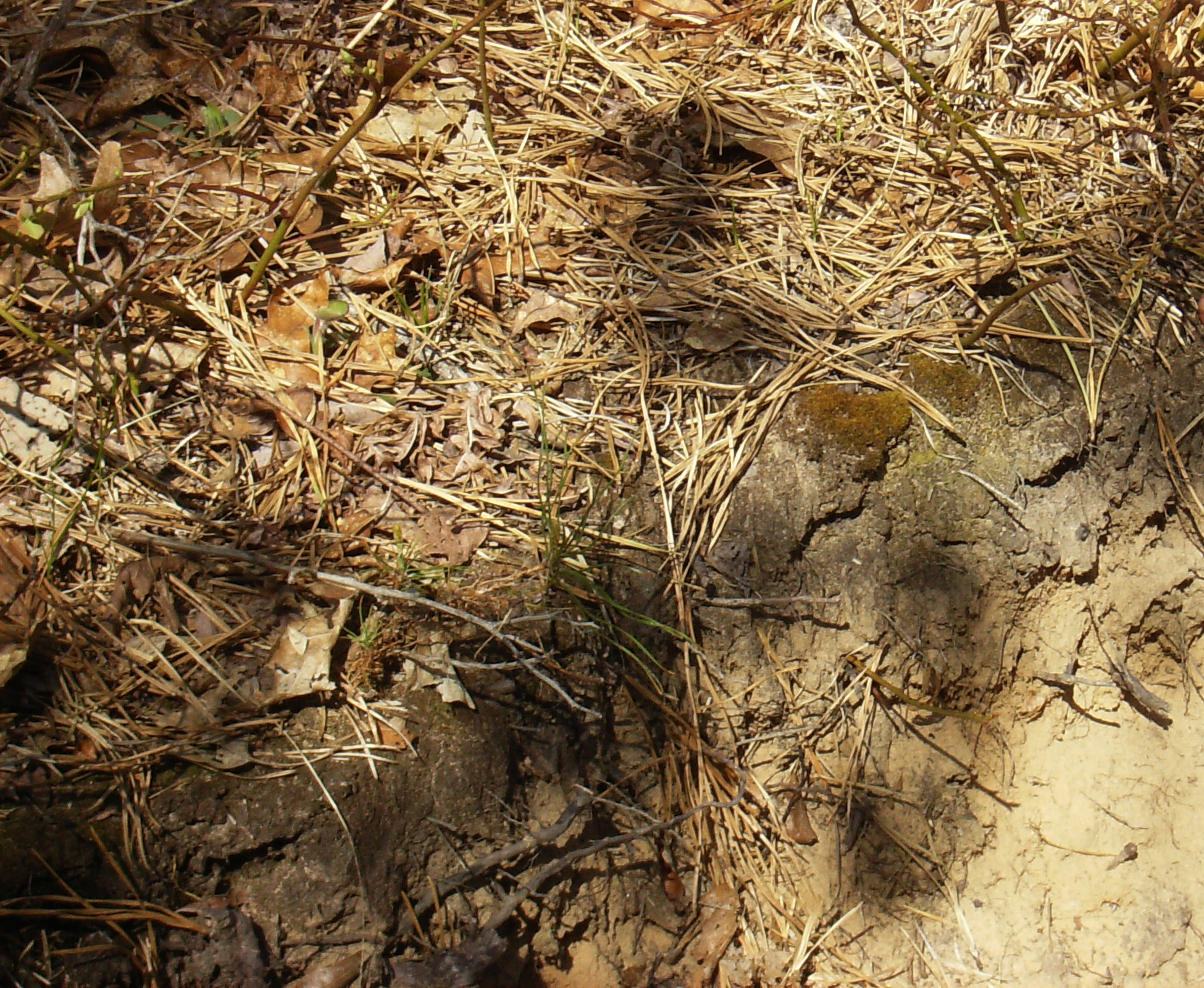
The soil at the Albany Pine Bush exhibiting a thick O horizon above sandy topsoils

Underlying the Albany Pine Bush is a bedrock consisting of shale and siltstone, laid down 450 million years ago during the Middle Ordovician. The bedrock is covered by glaciolacustrine deposits which make up the sandy topsoils of the barrens.

As the glaciers of the Wisconsin glaciation began to recede from the Hudson Valley area, a glacial lake known today as Lake Albany extended across the mid and upper Hudson Valley and a large delta formed west of Albany where the predecessor of the Mohawk River flowed into the lake. Along the shoreline of the lake, lacustrine sands were deposited between the present-day cities of Hudson and Glens Falls; this became the Hudson Valley sandplain. Relieved from the weight of the glacier, the land began to rebound, and the lake receded by draining into the Hudson River. The deposits of sand in the delta area were gradually sculpted by wind into sand dunes. Plants later colonized the land and stabilized the dunes. The Pine Bush originally occupied 40 square miles (100 km^{2}), or 60,000 acres, at which point it was the largest inland pine barrens in North America.

== Ecology ==
=== Flora ===
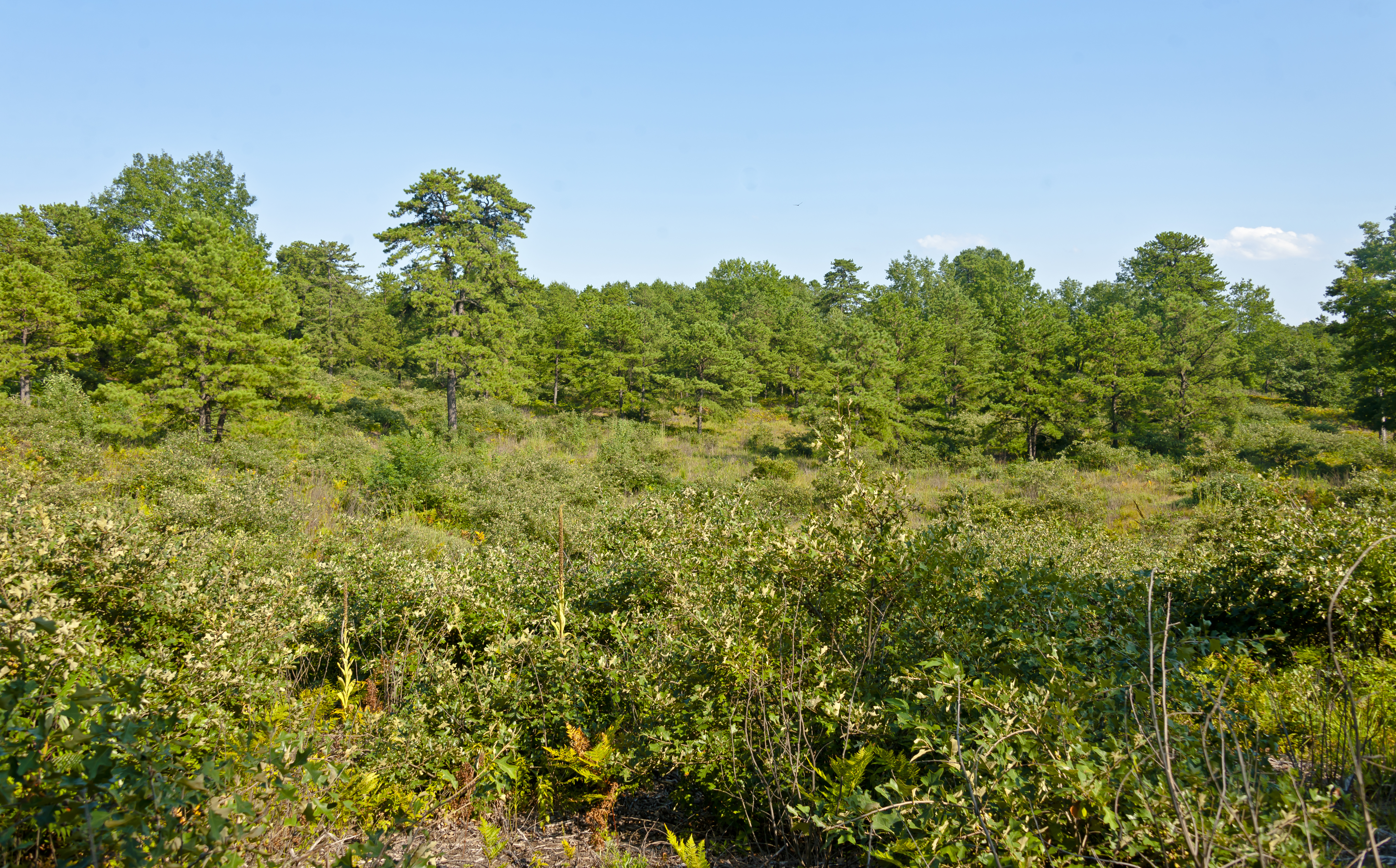
A typical Pine Bush landscape

Approximately half of the protected areas of the Albany Pine Bush (1,700 acres (690 ha) are remnant or restored pitch pine-scrub oak barrens. An additional 1,700 acres (690 ha) is in the process of restoration to the status of a pine barrens, especially with the use of prescribed burning. The remaining pine barrens are dominated by pitch pine (Pinus rigida), a tall shrub layer consisting of bear oak and dwarf chestnut oak (Quercus ilicifolia and Quercus prinoides), and a low shrub layer composed of lowbush blueberries (Vaccinium angustifolium and Vaccinium pallidum), black huckleberry (Gaylussacia baccata), and sweet fern (Comptonia peregrina). Between areas of pitch pine-scrub oak barrens are small patches of grassland dominated by prairie grasses, including big bluestem (Andropogon gerardi), little bluestem (Schizachyrium scoparium), Indiangrass (Sorghastrum nutans), as well as small trees like the shrubby willows (Salix humilis and Salix tristis). Characteristic flowering plants include New Jersey tea (Ceanothus americanus), bush clover (Lespedeza capitata), goat's-rue (Tephrosia virginiana), and wild lupine (Lupinus perennis).

Due to prolonged periods of fire suppression, much of the Pine Bush has become northern or southern hardwood forests. These forests, often dominated by invasive species, occupy roughly 500 acres (200 ha) of the Albany Pine Bush Preserve. The southern hardwood forests are dominated by black locust (Robinia pseudoacacia), which is exotic, and black cherry (Prunus serotina); with lesser numbers of native oaks (Quercus) and maples (Acer), and the exotic, invasive tree of heaven (Ailanthus altissima). The shrub layer is dominated by black raspberry (Rubus occidentalis) and other brambles (Rubus sp.). In contrast the northern hardwood forests are dominated by aspen (Populus), black cherry, red maple (Acer rubrum), white pine (Pinus strobus), gray birch (Betula populifolia), green ash (Fraxinus pennsylvanica), and oaks.

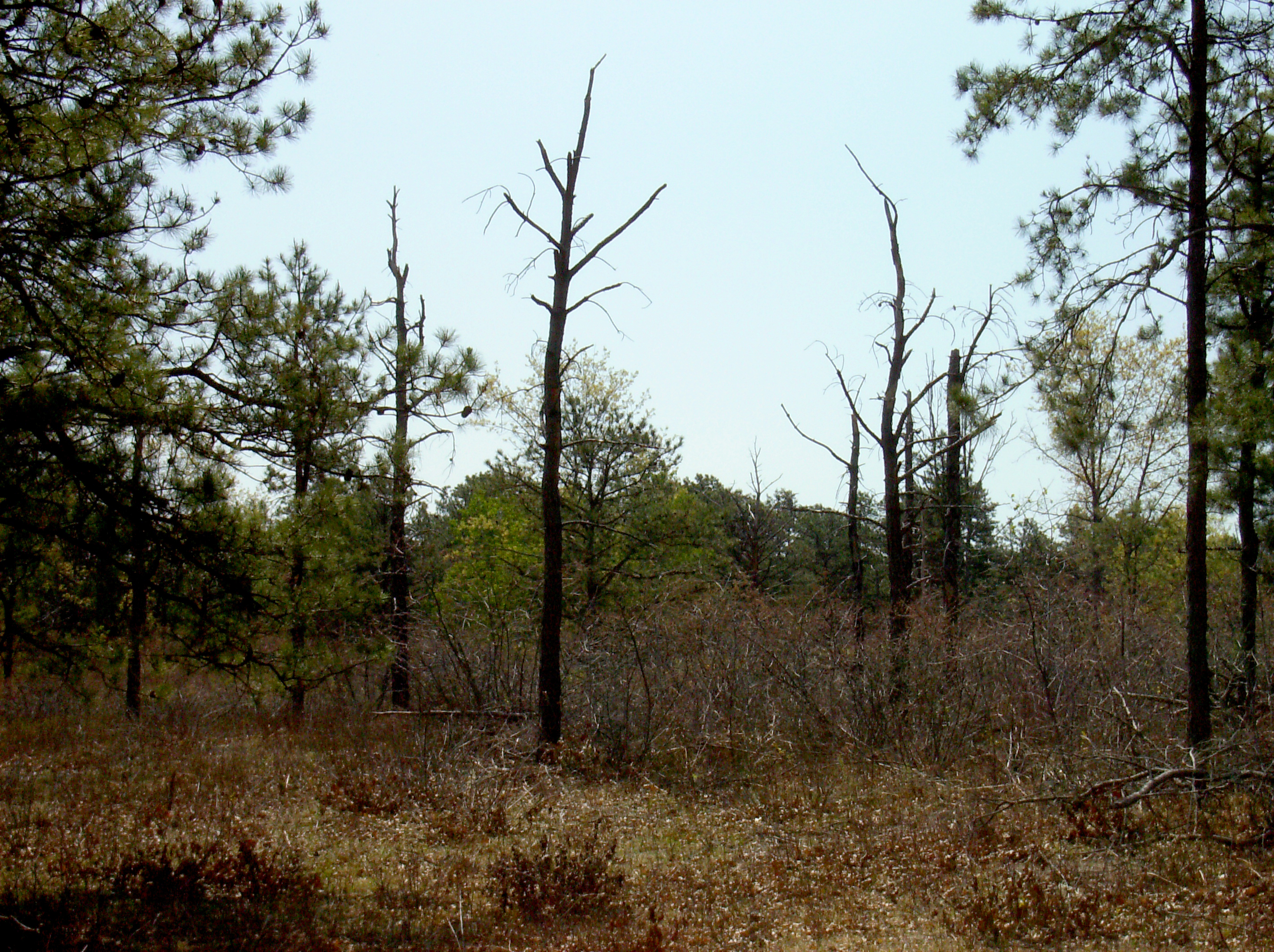
Pitch pines in the Pine Bush following a prescribed burn to induce germination

Ravines within the Pine Bush contain mixed forests of pine-northern hardwoods and Appalachian oak-pine. The pine-hardwood forests are dominated by species such as white pine and yellow birch (Betula alleghaniensis), mixed with scattered red maple, a shrub layer dominated by witch-hazel (Hamamelis virginiana), and a herbaceous layer composed of a variety of herbs, mosses, and lichens. The Appalachian oak-pine forest has a tree canopy of one or more oak species, primarily black oak, white oak, and red oak (Quercus velutina, Quercus alba, and Quercus rubra); these are mixed with pitch pine and some white pine, and a shrub layer dominated by heath shrubs, typically blueberries and black huckleberry. Marshes and wetlands occur along the northern boundary of the Pine Bush and along the bottoms of ravines. Roughly 35 acres (14 ha) of vernal pools have been mapped, these are ground-water fed ponds that are dominated by grasses, sedges, herbs, and low shrubs.

The Pine Bush is home to bog bluegrass (Poa paludigena), a federal species of concern, as well as the rare red-rooted flatsedge (Cyperus erythrorhizos), Houghton's umbrella-sedge (Cyperus houghtonii), and Schweinitz's flatsedge (Cyperus schweinitzii). Bog bluegrass occurs at the bottom of a ravine in the Pine Bush and is the only place in the New York Bight watershed where this plant appears. Bayard's malaxis (Malaxis bayardii) is a rare orchid that occurs in the Pine Bush as well.

=== Fauna ===
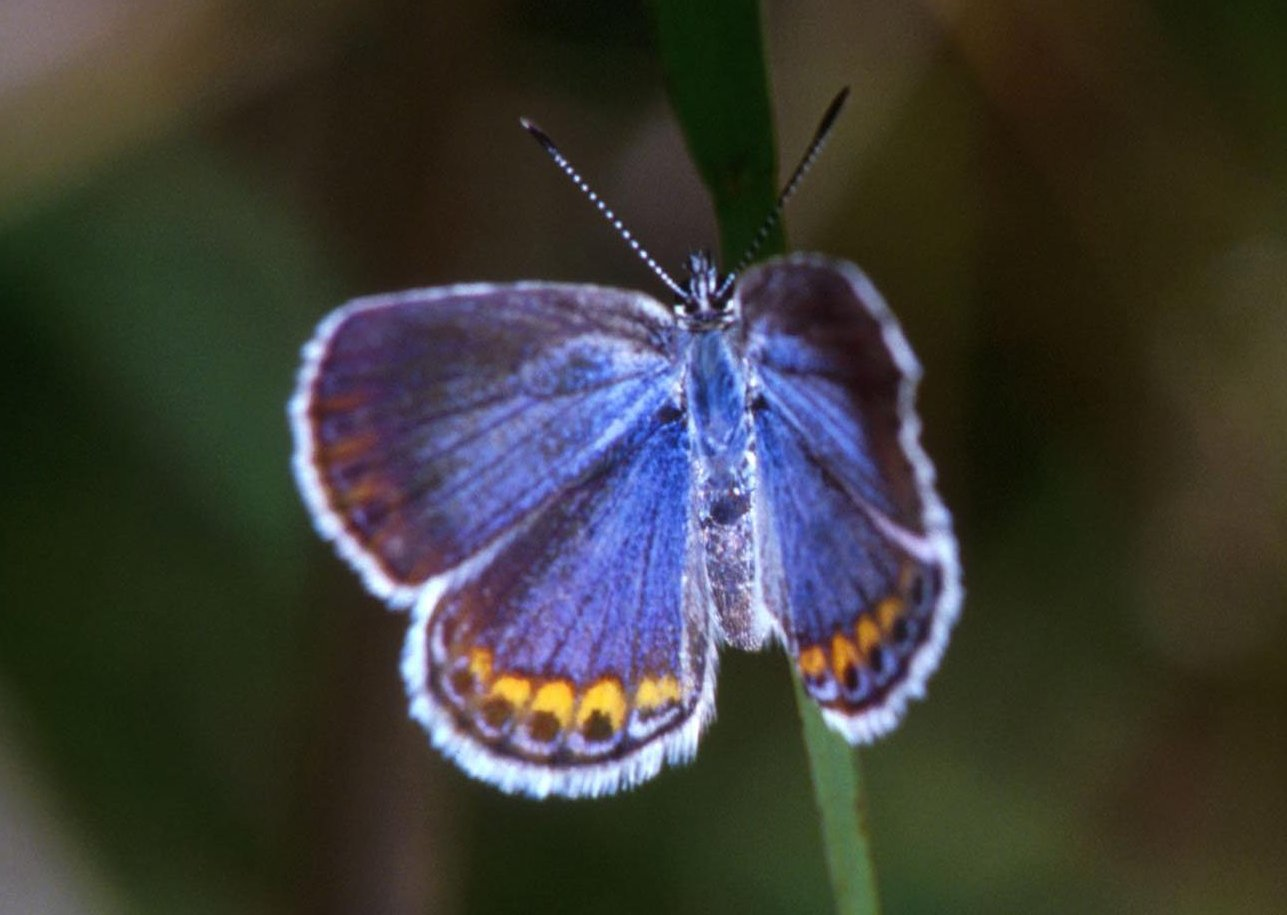
The Karner blue, an endangered butterfly indigenous to the Pine Bush, first identified by Vladimir Nabokov in 1944

The Albany Pine Bush is home to hundreds of species of Lepidoptera (butterflies and moths), including over 40 Noctuidae considered to be pine barrens specialists. The most well-known species in the area is the Karner blue (Plebejus melissa samuelis), discovered in the 1940s and named by the author and lepidopterist Vladimir Nabokov. The butterfly is now on the Endangered Species List. Once found in large numbers throughout oak savannahs and pine barrens of the Great Lakes region and the Northeast, it is today rare and found in only a handful of areas. Species-based management at the Pine Bush focuses on the host plant for its larvae – the wild blue lupine, which needs frequent fire to maintain its habitat. Other regionally rare butterflies include the dusted skipper (Atrytonopsis hianna), mottled duskywing (Erynnis martialis), frosted elfin (Incisalia irus), and Edward's hairstreak (Satyrium edwardsii). The inland barrens buck moth (Hemileuca maia) is a state-listed special concern animal; and other rare moths include the broad-lined catopyrrha (Catopyrrha coloraria), several noctuid moths (Apharetra purpurea, Chaetaglaea cerata, Chytonix sensilis, Macrochilo bivittata, and Zanclognatha martha), bird dropping moth (Cerma cora), and a geometrid moth (Itame). The Albarufan dagger moth was last seen in the Pine Bush in 1983 and is presumed locally extinct.

The Pine Bush is also home to 30 of the 44 species of amphibians and reptiles that are indigenous to Albany County. Seven of these species are generally not seen so far north in the state of New York. Three species of salamander, the Jefferson salamander (Ambystoma jeffersonium), blue-spotted salamander (Ambystoma laterale), and spotted salamander (Ambystoma maculatum), are state-listed special concern animals. Two species of turtle, the spotted turtle (Clemmys guttata) and wood turtle (Clemmys insculpta), are also special concern animals. It is listed as a state-level Important Bird Area. About 45 species of birds breed in the Albany Pine Bush (according to the 1985 New York State Breeding Bird Atlas) and are fairly common species for the area. About 32 species of common small mammals have been found in and adjacent to the Pine Bush.

== See also ==
- History of Albany, New York
- List of National Natural Landmarks in New York
- List of pine barrens

Other notable pine barrens

- Long Island Central Pine Barrens
- Pine Barrens (New Jersey)
- Rome Sand Plains

== Bibliography ==
- Burger, Joanna (2006). Whispers in the Pines: a Naturalist in the Northeast. Piscataway, NJ: Rutgers University Press. ISBN 978-0-8135-3794-8.
- Grondahl, Paul (2007). Mayor Erastus Corning: Albany Icon, Albany Enigma. Albany, NY: State University of New York Press. ISBN 978-0-7914-7294-1.
- Rittner, Don, ed. (April 1976). Pine Bush: Albany's Last Frontier. Albany, New York: Pine Bush Historic Preservation Project.
