= Mont Pleasant, Schenectady, New York =

Mont Pleasant City of Schenectady
- Neighborhood
- Location of Mont Pleasant within the state of New York
- Coordinates: 42°47′50″N 73°56′29″W
- Country: United States
- State: New York
- Region: Capital District
- County: Schenectady County
- annexed: 1903

Area
  - Total: 0.81 sq mi (2.1 km^{2})

Population (2000)
  - Total: 9,303
  - Density: 11,000/sq mi (4,400/km^{2})
- Time zone: UTC-5 (Eastern Standard Time)
  - Summer (DST): UTC-4 (Eastern Daylight Time)
- Area code: 518
- ZIP Code: 12303

Mont Pleasant is a neighborhood of Schenectady, New York, United States. It is located in the south central part of the city and is the most populated of Schenectady's neighborhoods and has the most housing units as well.

== History ==
Mont Pleasant was annexed by the city of Schenectady in 1903 and 1904 from the neighboring town of Rotterdam. Mont Pleasant was once a vibrant blue collar neighborhood of immigrants, including Italians, Poles, and Jews in mostly two-family homes. Several ethnic churches and at least two synagogues and the Jewish Community Center (JCC) were built in Mont Pleasant. When General Electric and other area manufacturers downsized, Mont Pleasant's residents began to move to the suburbs and the number of owner-occupied homes declined. Mont Pleasant's Jewish congregations and the JCC moved to the suburbs of Niskayuna. The exodus from Mont Pleasant was vividly demonstrated in an Associated Press database of US Postal Service records released in 2009 which showed that 28% of residential units in Mont Pleasant were vacant, which was the third highest in the state of New York.

== Demographics ==
In 2000 Mont Pleasant had a population of 9,303, which was a decrease of 3.9% from 1990; it is the most populated of Schenectady's neighborhoods. The largest decrease was by seniors at 17.4%, followed by pre-school children at 13.2% and adults at a 7.6% decrease. The only population segment to post an increase was that of school-age children between the ages of 5 and 19, that segment increased by 35.5%. The median age in Mont Pleasant is 40.4, second highest among Schenectady's neighborhoods.

There are 4,616 housing units in the neighborhood (a 5.4% decrease from 1990 to 2000) with an average of 2.32 residents per household. The neighborhood has the most housing units of any Schenectady neighborhood. 24% of the housing units are owner occupied while 76% are renter occupied. Owner-occupied housing increased from 1990 to 2000 though.

The median income for Mont Pleasant was $27,824 in 2000. 72.8% of neighborhood residents were low-income, 48.7% were very low income, and 19.4% lived below the poverty level. Minorities comprise 20.7% of the residents.

== Geography ==
Mont Pleasant occupies approximately 521 acres (211 ha) in the south central part of Schenectady. The town of Rotterdam is to the south. The CSX railroad line is to the west separating the neighborhood from the Bellevue neighborhood, while Interstate 890 serves as the eastern boundary with the Hamilton Hill neighborhood. The northern border is Broadway which separates the neighborhood from the General Electric plant.

== Land use ==
Of Mont Pleasant's approximately 521 acres (211 ha) residential properties account for 63% of all land use with community service properties at 10.7%, commercial properties at 10.4% and recreation and entertainment properties at only 7.4%. 32 acres (13 ha) or 6% of the land in the neighborhood is vacant. Mont Pleasant comprises 9.5% of the Schenectady's land area, and generates only 11.6% of the city's property tax revenue. About 26% of the neighborhood is tax exempt, which is the second lowest percentage among the city's neighborhoods. Mont Pleasant has 4,616 housing units, the most among Schenectady's neighborhoods.

== Architecture ==
Two family homes make up approximately 44% of the housing units in the neighborhood and 65.5% of structures were built before 1939. 48% of residential properties are owner occupied and 51.9% are renter occupied. The median gross rent for the Mont Pleasant neighborhood was $553 in 2000 and the median value of owner-occupied homes in the neighborhood in 2000 was $58,525.

== Education ==
Mont Pleasant has several schools which are part of the Schenectady City School District. The Hamilton Elementary School which serves students in pre-kindergarten to fifth grades and The Academy of Culture & Communication Magnet School at Pleasant Valley serves students from kindergarten to fifth grades are the elementary schools. Mont Pleasant Middle School serves students from sixth to eighth grades, after which students go on to Schenectady High. The Career Center at Steinmetz is provides academic programs for students in ninth to twelfth grades. A branch of the Schenectady County Public Library is located in Mont Pleasant as well.

The Mont Pleasant Middle School opened in 1931 as one of Schenectady's two high schools. In 1992, the other high school, Linton High, merged with Mont Pleasant with Linton becoming Schenectady High and Mont Pleasant a middle school.

== Recreation ==
There are many parks and ballparks within Mont Pleasant. Stelmack Park is a passive park; Tenth & Webster Park and Orchard Park are both 1 acre (0.40 ha) and each includes a basketball court and play equipment; Wallingford Park includes a basketball court, water mushroom, and play equipment; Michigan Avenue Park at 3.88 acres (1.57 ha) has tennis courts; the Quackenbush Park is a 2 acres (0.81 ha) with a basketball court, swimming pool, and play equipment; the Mont Pleasant Athletic Field encompasses 14.1 acres (5.7 ha) and includes a baseball field; Grout Park offers basketball court, tennis courts, baseball field, play equipment, and a rugby field.

== See also ==
- Hamilton Hill, Schenectady, New York
- Stockade Historic District
- Union Street Historic District (Schenectady, New York)
- Woodlawn, Schenectady, New York
