= Woodlawn, Schenectady, New York =

Woodlawn City of Schenectady
- Neighborhood
- Location of Woodlawn within the state of New York
- Coordinates: 42°46′40″N 73°54′25″W
- Country: United States
- State: New York
- Region: Capital District
- County: Schenectady County
- Annexed: 1923

Area
  - Total: 1.94 sq mi (5.0 km^{2})

Population (2000)
  - Total: 8,564
  - Density: 4,410/sq mi (1,700/km^{2})
- Time zone: UTC-5 (Eastern Standard Time)
  - Summer (DST): UTC-4 (Eastern Daylight Time)
- Area code: 518
- ZIP Code: 12304
- Website: Woodlawn Neighborhood Association

Woodlawn is a neighborhood of Schenectady, New York, United States, which occupies the entire southeastern section of that city. The neighborhood developed as a suburb of the city of Schenectady in the first two decades of the 20th century and was annexed to the city in 1923. Consisting of mostly single family detached houses it is only one of three neighborhoods in Schenectady to post an increase in population during the 1990s; Woodlawn's median population is also the oldest of Schenectady's neighborhoods.

== History ==
Around 1900 Woodlawn was a series of large and small farms along the Albany-Schenectady Road, in the towns of Niskayuna and Rotterdam. One of the large landowners was Jacob Fehr who owned an expansive farm in the vicinity of the Schenectady Municipal Golf Course, Fehr Avenue through Central Park is named for him. It was around the turn of the 20th century that Woodlawn began to become a suburb of the city of Schenectady. In 1901 the Schenectady Railway Company built an interurban line to Albany along the south side of the Albany-Schenectady Road, which at that time was a two-lane road. The railway along the Albany-Schenectady Road (now State Street) was abandoned in 1933 and State Street was expanded to a spacious four-lane road with a center turning lane. Also in 1901 Parkview Cemetery was opened and in 1912 Central Park was constructed as the jewel of Schenectady's park system. From 1910-1915 one of the earliest airfields in the Capital District was located in Woodlawn along Eastholm Road. After World War I Woodlawn began to become a true suburban environment and residents began to push for annexation to Schenectady so as to receive municipal services such as sewers, fire hydrants, paving, and trash collection. In 1923 Woodlawn was annexed to the city.

Where the Stadium Golf Course is today was once the Schenectady Stadium, which housed the minor-league team the Schenectady Blue Jays from 1946 to 1957.

== Demographics ==
In 2000, Woodlawn had a population of 8,564, an increase of 1.9% from 1990, making one of only three neighborhoods in Schenectady to post an increase in that decade. There were 3,902 housing units in the neighborhood (a 5.9% increase from 1990 to 2000) with an average of 2.36 residents per household. Of the housing units, 62.1% were owner-occupied while 37.9% were renter-occupied. While the percentage of owner-occupied housing had declined in Woodlawn it remained the second-highest owner-occupied percentage in the city.

The median age in Woodlawn was 40.6, which was the oldest in the city and the senior population had increased more in Woodlawn than in any of the other Schenectady neighborhoods. The 0-4 pre-school population in the neighborhood declined by 15% between 1990 and 2000 while the elderly population increased by 46%. The school-age population increased by 10.6% and the adult population by 0.5%.

The median income for Woodlawn was $36,931 in 2000. Of neighborhood residents, 57.1% were considered low-income, while 37.6% were very low income and 12.0% lived below the poverty level. Minorities comprised 16.3% of the residents.

== Geography ==
Woodlawn occupies approximately 1,239 acres (501 ha) of the southeastern portion of the city of Schenectady; Fehr Avenue is the western boundary, with Golf Road and the Crosstown Connection as the northern boundary, and the Schenectady city line serving as the southern and eastern boundary.

== Land use ==
Of Woodlawn's approximately 1,239 acres (501 ha) residential properties account for 44.7% of all land use with community service properties at 21%, recreation and entertainment properties at 20%, and commercial properties at only 9%. 6% of the land in Woodlawn is vacant. Woodlawn comprises 22.5% of Schenectady's land area, but generates only 17.9% of the city’s property tax revenue. Woodlawn generates only about 80% of the property tax revenue expected based on land area. About 17% of the neighborhood is tax exempt, which is the second lowest percentage among the city’s neighborhoods.

== Architecture ==
North and west of the Crosstown Arterial (NY 7) Woodlawn has an urban feel, with houses set close together on short streets with few trees, while the rest of Woodlawn especially near the elementary schools have similar styles to the suburban areas surrounding Schenectady. The suburban feel of the majority of Woodlawn is complemented by tree-shaded streets and landscaped lawns. Architectural styles include Capes, bungalows, and Colonial homes.

Single-family detached homes make up approximately 63.4% of the housing units which is the highest among Schenectady's neighborhoods and 29.6% of structures were built before 1939, which is the lowest percentage in all of Schenectady's neighborhoods. The median gross rent for the Woodlawn neighborhood was $607 in 2000, the second highest among the neighborhoods and the median value of owner-occupied homes in the neighborhood in 2000 was $72,580.

== Recreation ==
Woodlawn has many facilities for recreation including two golf courses (one public, one private), Woodlawn Park, and the Woodlawn Branch Public Library. The Woodlawn Preserve is a forever wild preserve of rare Albany Pine Bush.

== Education ==
Woodlawn is a part of the Schenectady City School District and the children attend either Paige or Woodlawn elementary schools in the community then go on to the Central Park Middle School and Schenectady High School. There are two private schools in the neighborhood, the Brown School, a K-8 school and the Notre Dame-Bishop Gibbons High School.

== See also ==
- Union Street Historic District (Schenectady, New York)
- Stockade Historic District
- Mont Pleasant, Schenectady, New York
