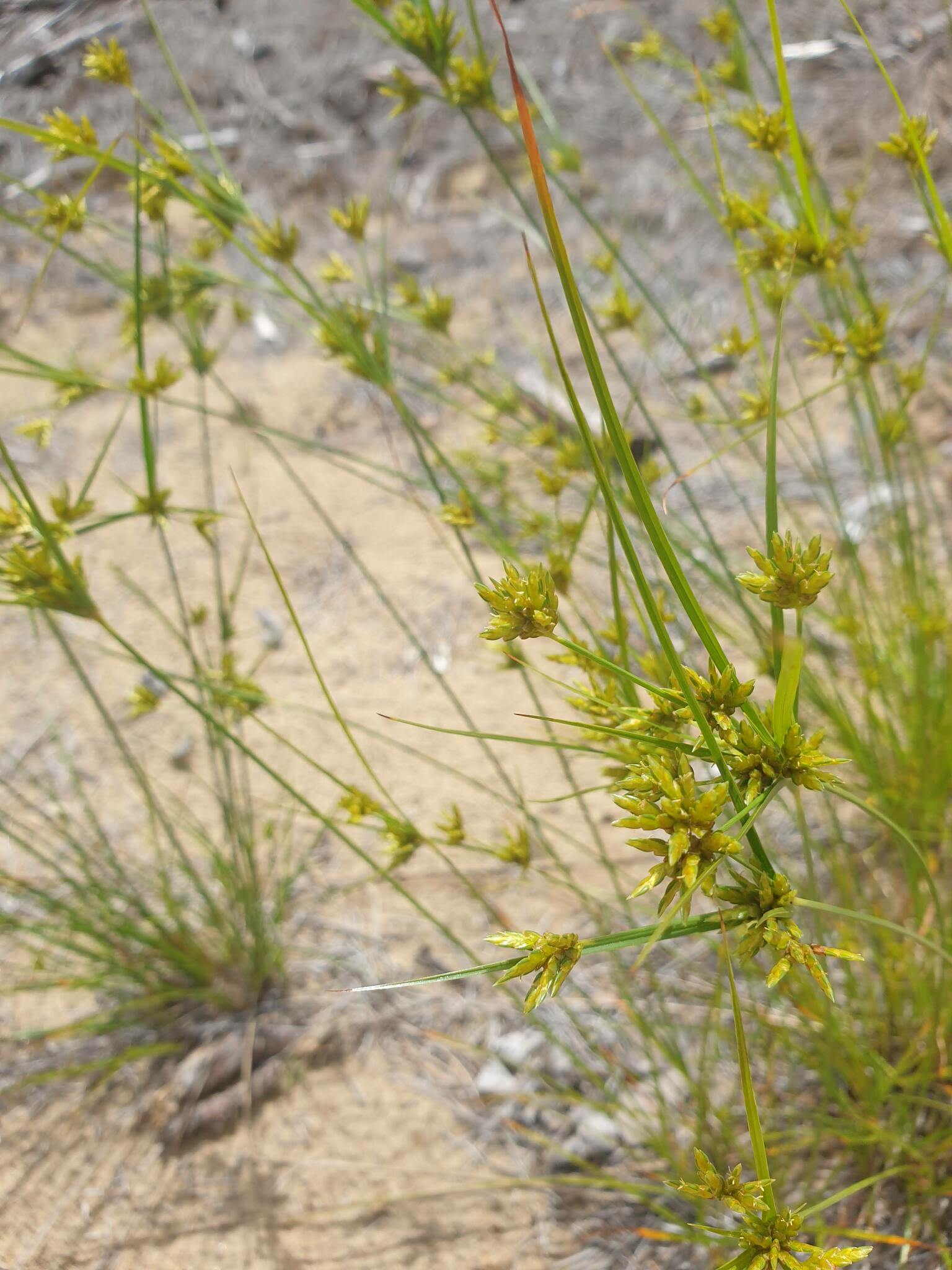

Conservation status
- Apparently Secure (NatureServe)

Scientific classification
- Kingdom: Plantae
- Clade: Embryophytes
- Clade: Tracheophytes
- Clade: Spermatophytes
- Clade: Angiosperms
- Clade: Monocots
- Clade: Commelinids
- Order: Poales
- Family: Cyperaceae
- Genus: Cyperus
- Species: C. houghtonii

Binomial name
- Cyperus houghtonii Torr.

= Cyperus houghtonii =

Species of sedge

Cyperus houghtonii, commonly known as Houghton's flatsedge, is an uncommon species of sedge that is native to parts of eastern and midwestern North America.

== Description ==
Cyperus houghtonii seems be of a backcross hybrid origin from Cyperus lupulinus ssp. macilentus and Cyperus schweinitzii. It has been theorized that glaciated habitats where Cyperus houghtonii is commonly found provided a new niche that neither of its parents species were well adapted too, with Cyperus houghtonii being more suited to the habitat.

Cyperus houghtonii possesses one to five flower clusters which measure up to 3/4 inch across at the tip of the stem. Each flower cluster has three to 18 spikelets. At the base of the flower clusters are three to eight erect to ascending bracts that measure one to eight inches in length. The spikelets are flattened and oblong, measuring 1.5 cm in length. Each floret has three stamens and a three-parted style. Cyperus houghtonii grows four to 20 inches tall.

== Taxonomy ==
Cyperus houghtonii was named and described by the American botanist John Torrey in 1836. As of February 2026, the botanical name Cyperus houghtonii Torr. is widely accepted.

== Distribution and habitat ==
Cyperus houghtonii is found in various dry and sandy habitats such as ledges, roadsides, lakeshores, sandplains, woodlands, shale barrens, and rock outcrops. It is found in Manitoba, Minnesota, Michigan, Indiana, Vermont, Maryland, Massachusetts, Ontario, Pennsylvania, New Hampshire, North Carolina, Quebec, Virginia, and Wisconsin. It is historic in Maine and Ohio. Cyperus houghtonii is regarded as rare throughout its range. In Minnesota, Cyperus houghtonii is often found in or near jack pine stands.

== Conservation ==
Although Cyperus houghtonii has a wide distribution, it is uncommon or rare throughout much of its range. Potential threats include habitat destruction, fire suppression, and succession, trampling by hikers, and off-road vehicles. Many activities that are considered destructive to this and other species may be beneficial to Cyperus houghtonii such as logging, sand and gravel extraction, or off-road vehicle use.

== See also ==
- List of Cyperus species

== Bibliography ==
- Torrey, John (1836). "Monograph of the North American Cyperaceae". Annals of the Lyceum of Natural History of New York. 3: 239–448.
