= Barry Kramer =

American basketball player and jurist (1942–2025)

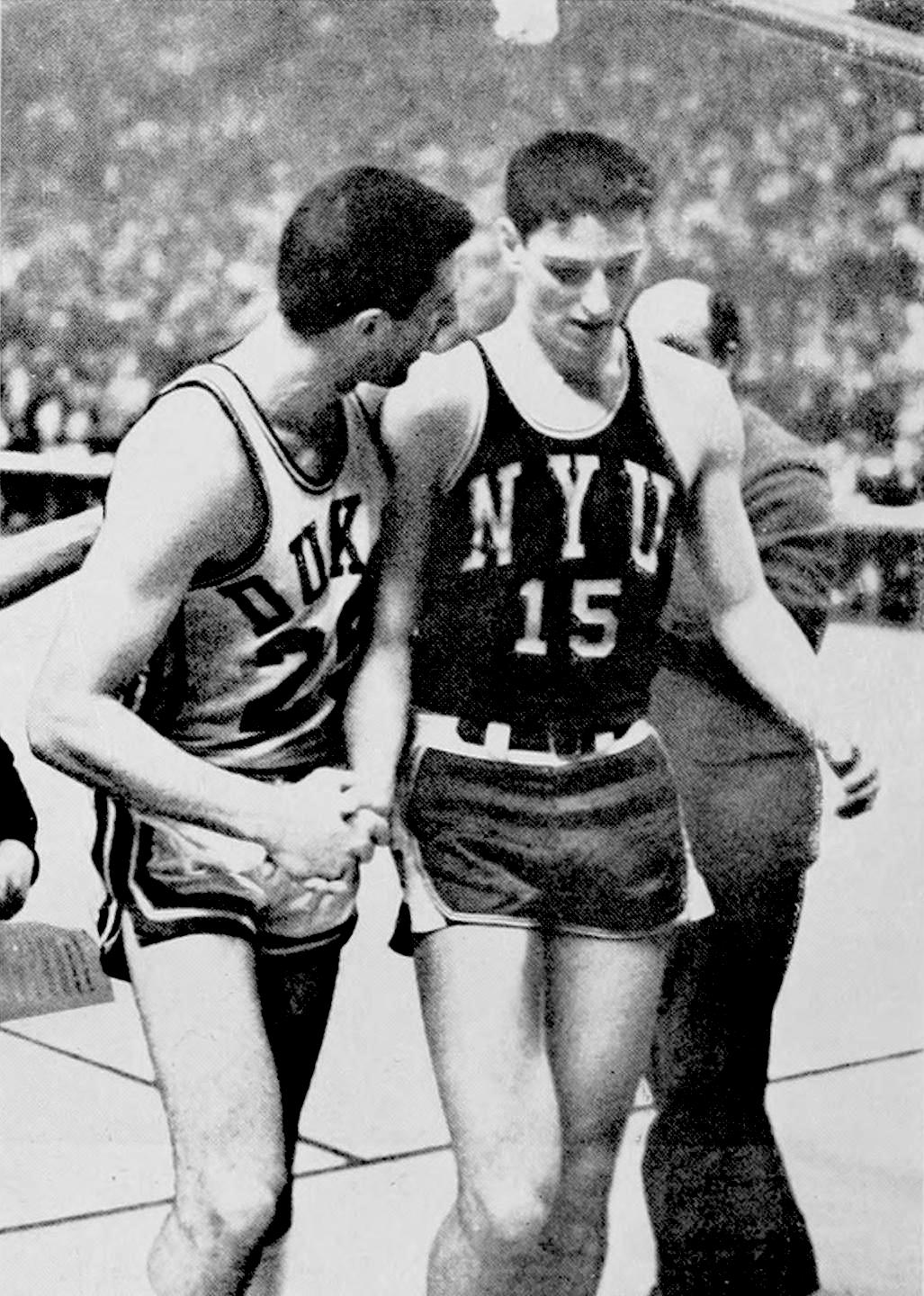
- Kramer (right) shaking hands with fellow first-team All-American Art Heyman after Duke defeated NYU 81–76 in the 1963 NCAA tournament

Personal information
- Born: November 10, 1942 Schenectady, New York, U.S.
- Died: January 4, 2025 (aged 82)
- Listed height: 6 ft 4 in (1.93 m)
- Listed weight: 200 lb (91 kg)

Career information
- High school: Linton (Schenectady, New York)
- College: NYU (1961–1964)
- NBA draft: 1964: 1st round, 6th overall pick
- Drafted by: San Francisco Warriors
- Playing career: 1964–1970
- Position: Small forward
- Number: 34, 21, 15

Career history
- 1964–1965: San Francisco Warriors
- 1965: New York Knicks
- 1969–1970: New York Nets

Career highlights
- Haggerty Award winner (1963); Consensus first-team All-American (1963); Third-team All-American – AP, NABC (1964); First-team Parade All-American (1960)
- Stats at NBA.com
- Stats at Basketball Reference

Barry D. Kramer (November 10, 1942 – January 4, 2025) was an American professional basketball player, jurist and attorney. Kramer was named a first-team Parade All-American basketball player for Linton High School in Schenectady, New York, and a consensus first-team All-American playing collegiately for the NYU Violets. Following his playing career, he served as a trial court judge in the New York state court system.

== Basketball career ==
A 6-foot-4-inch (1.93 m), 200-pound (91 kg) guard–forward, Kramer played for Linton High School in Schenectady, New York. Future NBA basketball player and coach Pat Riley was a freshman at Linton when Kramer was a senior. Kramer won two Section II championships at Linton and was named a first-team Parade All-American in 1960. He was later inducted into the Schenectady School District Hall of Fame.

After graduating from Linton in 1960, Kramer attended New York University (NYU). Kramer was named a consensus first-team All-American as a junior in 1963. That year, Kramer was the second-leading scorer in college basketball, averaging 29.3 points per game; he also received the Haggerty Award as the best college basketball player in the New York City metropolitan area. Kramer played in the 1963 NCAA tournament and the 1964 NIT with NYU. As a senior in the 1963–64 season, Kramer was named a third-team All-American by both the Associated Press and the National Association of Basketball Coaches. He was later named to the NYU Athletic Hall of Fame.

Kramer was selected by the San Francisco Warriors with the sixth pick in the 1964 NBA draft. He played one season in the NBA, a portion of which he spent playing for the Warriors and a portion of which he spent playing for the New York Knicks. Kramer averaged 3.6 points per game that season. Kramer later played in the rival American Basketball Association with the New York Nets in the 1969–1970 season.

In 2009, Kramer was selected by the Capital District Basketball Hall of Fame as the premier area basketball player over the past 50 years. He was inducted into the National Jewish Sports Hall of Fame in 2014.

== Legal and judicial career ==
Kramer became an attorney after graduating from Albany Law School in 1968; he finished second in his class. He was appointed to a Surrogate Court judgeship in Schenectady, New York by Gov. Mario Cuomo in 1993, was elected to the post later that year, and was re-elected in 2003. In November 2009, Kramer was elected as a Justice of the New York State Supreme Court–a trial-level court–in New York's Fourth Judicial District. After reaching the mandatory retirement age for New York judges in 2012, Kramer continued to serve on the court through a certification process available to retired judges. Kramer joined the law firm of McNamee Lochner P.C. in 2019.

== Personal life and death ==
Kramer was born in Schenectady, New York, on November 10, 1942. He died on January 4, 2025, at the age of 82.

== Career statistics ==
Legend
GP	Games played	GS	Games started	MPG	Minutes per game
FG%	Field goal percentage	3P%	3-point field goal percentage	FT%	Free throw percentage
RPG	Rebounds per game	APG	Assists per game	SPG	Steals per game
BPG	Blocks per game	PPG	Points per game	**Bold**	Career high

=== College ===
*	Led Metropolitan NY Conference

Year	Team	GP	FG%	FT%	RPG	PPG
1961–62	NYU	24	.436	.745	9.1	17.7
1962–63	NYU	23	**.475**	**.830**	**12.0**	**29.3***
1963–64	NYU	**27**	.428	.758	7.2	21.0
Career		74	.447	.787	9.3	22.5

=== NBA/ABA ===
==== Regular season ====
Year	Team	GP	GS	MPG	FG%	3P%	FT%	RPG	APG	PPG
1964–65	San Francisco	**33**	0	8.4	**.360**		.682	1.8	**.8**	3.1
1964–65	N.Y. Knicks	19	0	**12.2**	.314		.750	**2.2**	**.8**	**4.4**
1969–70	N.Y. Nets (ABA)	7		8.0	.323	.000	**.875**	1.9	.4	3.9
Career (NBA)		52	0	9.8	.339		.714	1.9	.8	3.6
Career (overall)		59	0	9.5	.336	.000	.728	1.9	.7	3.6
