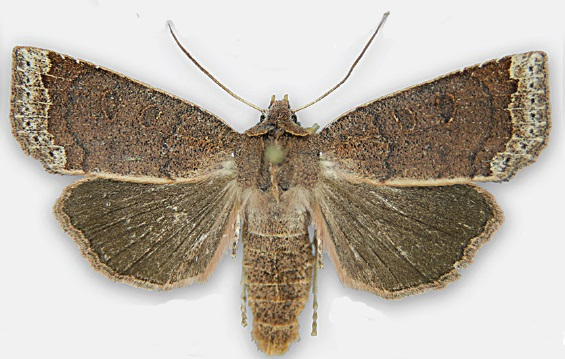
- Chaetaglaea tremula

Scientific classification
- Kingdom: Animalia
- Phylum: Arthropoda
- Class: Insecta
- Order: Lepidoptera
- Superfamily: Noctuoidea
- Family: Noctuidae
- Subtribe: Xylenina
- Genus: Chaetaglaea; Franclemont, 1943

= Chaetaglaea =

Genus of moths

Chaetaglaea is a genus of moths of the family Noctuidae.

== Species ==
- Chaetaglaea cerata Franclemont, 1943
- Chaetaglaea fergusoni Brou, 1997
- Chaetaglaea rhonda Stead & Troubridge, 2016
- Chaetaglaea sericea (Morrison, 1874)
- Chaetaglaea tremula (Harvey, 1875)
