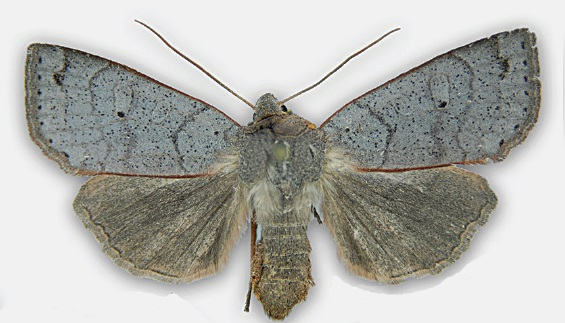
- Female
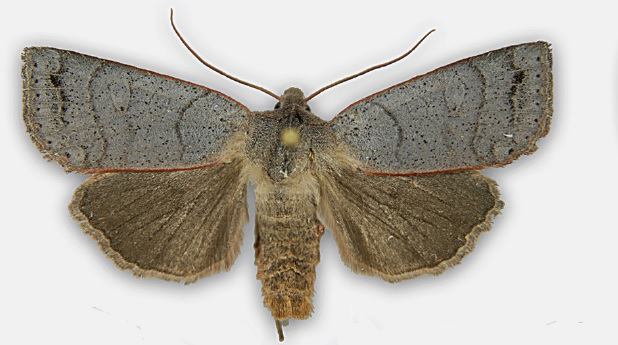
- Male

Scientific classification
- Domain: Eukaryota
- Kingdom: Animalia
- Phylum: Arthropoda
- Class: Insecta
- Order: Lepidoptera
- Superfamily: Noctuoidea
- Family: Noctuidae
- Genus: Chaetaglaea
- Species: C. rhonda

Binomial name
- Chaetaglaea rhonda Stead & Troubridge, 2016

= Chaetaglaea rhonda =

Species of moth

Chaetaglaea rhonda is a moth in the family Noctuidae. In Canada, it is presently known only from dunes along the shore of Lake Huron in Lambton County, Ontario. In the United States, it is known from Carolina Beach State Park, New Hanover County, North Carolina. It is expected that the species occurs in suitable habitats up and down the Atlantic seaboard.

The forewings are glossy gunmetal gray (brick red in specimens from the Atlantic coast) with numerous black scales, the costal and posterior margins red. The darker gray antemedial and postmedial lines are evenly concave from the costa to vein CuA2, where both lines turn slightly toward the outer margin. The subterminal line is slightly lighter gray than the ground color, scalloped between the veins below vein M3. Between veins M3 and R5, the line is evenly convex, terminating closest to outer margin on vein R5 and then bending inward toward the costa. Black scales occur along the anterior margin of the subterminal line, forming a distinct black spot in cell M5. These black scales gradually fade between vein M5 and the costa and below vein M1. The outer margin has a series of black dots between the veins and the orbicular and reniform (kidney-shaped) spots are poorly demarcated by thin gray lines. A black dot occurs in the lower margin of the reniform spot. The hindwings are dark gray brown with concolorous fringe.

== Etymology ==
The species is named in honor of Rhonda Landry.
