= Chaetaglaea sericea =

Scientific classification
- Domain: Eukaryota
- Kingdom: Animalia
- Phylum: Arthropoda
- Class: Insecta
- Order: Lepidoptera
- Superfamily: Noctuoidea
- Family: Noctuidae
- Tribe: Xylenini
- Subtribe: Xylenina
- Genus: Chaetaglaea
- Species: C. sericea

Binomial name
- Chaetaglaea sericea (Morrison, 1874)

Species of moth

Chaetaglaea sericea, the silky sallow, is a species of cutworm or dart moth in the family Noctuidae. It is found in North America.

The MONA or Hodges number for Chaetaglaea sericea is 9950.
