= Chaetaglaea fergusoni =

Scientific classification
- Domain: Eukaryota
- Kingdom: Animalia
- Phylum: Arthropoda
- Class: Insecta
- Order: Lepidoptera
- Superfamily: Noctuoidea
- Family: Noctuidae
- Genus: Chaetaglaea
- Species: C. fergusoni

Binomial name
- Chaetaglaea fergusoni Brou, 1997

Species of moth

Chaetaglaea fergusoni, or Ferguson's sallow moth, is a moth in the family Noctuidae. It was described by Vernon Antoine Brou Jr. in 1997 and is found in North America.

The MONA or Hodges number for Chaetaglaea fergusoni is 9948.1.
