= Woodlawn Preserve =

Protected ecosystem in Schenectady, New York

- Location within New York
- Location: Schenectady, New York
- Coordinates: 42.76768°N 73.91037°W
- Area: 135 acres (55 ha)
- Established: 1969

The Woodlawn Preserve is a patch of the Albany Pine Bush in the Woodlawn neighborhood of the city of Schenectady, New York. It is the only remaining example of this rare ecosystem in that area, a combination of swamp, wetlands, water bodies, and dune vegetation, and one of the most biologically diverse parcels in Schenectady County.

== Description ==
The low-lying areas of the preserve are wetlands while the higher portions are pitch pine-scrub oak barrens with some of the largest sand dunes found in the Albany Pine Bush. While the preserve has traditionally been a Karner Blue butterfly habitat, there are no current populations of the endangered species there. The preserve and neighboring lands in the town of Niskayuna are part of the Woodlawn Pine Barrens-Wetlands Complex, which is recognized by the state of New York's Open Space Conservation Plan as a priority conservation project.

== History ==
The preserve was created by the city in 1969 as 135 acres (55 ha) of forever wild land, and is home to the headwaters of the Lisha Kill and numerous rare plants. It is the largest passive park in the city of Schenectady.

The city has been repeatedly approached by developers seeking to purchase the land for housing developments. In 1993 88 acres (36 ha) were requested, with an extra 27 acres (11 ha) to be developed as a park. This raised an outcry by the Concerned Citizens to Save the Woodlawn Preserve organization, which argued that such development contradicted the intent and purpose of establishing a nature preserve. In 2003 the Forever Wild status was still intact on the 135 acres (0.55 km^{2}) but was again threatened by another offer of $196,000 for 196 plots.

A Quality Communities Grant was awarded to Schenectady in 2007 to promote the "preservation and beautification" of the Preserve. This coincided with the Preserve being added to the New York Open Space Conservation Plan. In 2008, a five-year plan was developed between the city and the state to organize the improvement of the Preserve.

In 2009, Schenectady County created 24 acres (9.7 ha) of protected parkland in Niskayuna within the Woodlawn Pine Barrens-Wetlands Complex, which was then deeded to the town. This was considered an important step in linking the Woodlawn Preserve and the Albany Pine Bush Preserve.

== See also ==
- List of pine barrens

=== Other notable pine barrens ===
- Long Island Central Pine Barrens
- Rome Sand Plains
- Pine Barrens (New Jersey)
