= Save the Pine Bush =

- Founded: February 6, 1978
- Founder: John Wolcott; Rezsin Adams; Lynne Jackson; Mark Plaat; Gregg Bell
- Purpose: Preservation of the Pine Bush
- Location: Capital District
- Region served: Albany Pine Bush
- Key people: John Wolcott, cofounder Lynne Jackson, webmaster
- Website: savethepinebush.org

Save the Pine Bush is a not-for-profit community group which came into being on February 6, 1978. Its mission is to stop development of the Albany Pine Bush in the Capital District of the U.S. state of New York. Today the group continues to be an active environmental community.

Mainly through litigation, Save the Pine Bush has prevented or delayed the construction of several developments in the Pine Bush.
