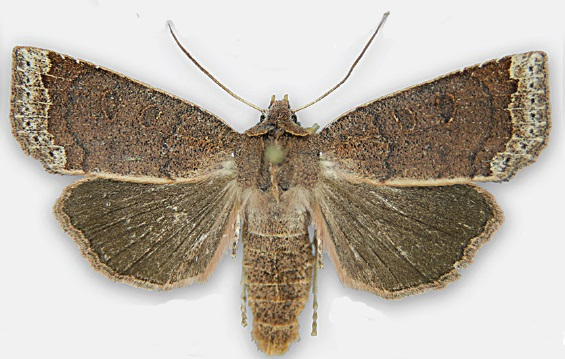

Scientific classification
- Kingdom: Animalia
- Phylum: Arthropoda
- Clade: Pancrustacea
- Class: Insecta
- Order: Lepidoptera
- Superfamily: Noctuoidea
- Family: Noctuidae
- Genus: Chaetaglaea
- Species: C. tremula

Binomial name
- Chaetaglaea tremula (Harvey, 1875)

Synonyms
- Glaea tremula Harvey, 1875

= Chaetaglaea tremula =

Species of moth

Chaetaglaea tremula, the trembling sallow, is a moth in the family Noctuidae. It is found from southern Florida, through Louisiana and Mississippi west to eastern Texas.

Adults exhibit tremendous individual variation, with the forewings varying from brick red to tan, brown, or black. The subterminal area of the forewings can be concolorous with the ground color of the forewings or much paler. The anal margin of the forewings normally has a pale beige line, bordered by a brick red fringe.

Larvae have been reared on blueberries, cherries and oaks.
