= Brandywine Avenue School =

- U.S. National Register of Historic Places
- Location within New York Location within the United States
- Location: 108 Brandywine Ave., Schenectady, New York
- Coordinates: 42°48′8″N 73°55′29″W
- Area: 1.3 acres (0.53 ha)
- Built: 1904
- Architect: Wooley, W Thomas; Hanrahan Bros.
- Architectural style: Classical Revival
- NRHP reference No.: 99001491
- Added to NRHP: December 9, 1999

Brandywine Avenue School was a historic school located at Schenectady in Schenectady County, New York. It was built in 1904 and was a 3 1/2-story, red brick U-shaped institutional building in the Classical Revival style. It sat on a basement of rock-faced limestone and had a hipped roof. It operated as a teacher training facility from 1910 to 1925 and ceased being used as a school in 1974. From 1975 to 1996, it housed Schenectady City School District administrative offices and records storage.

It was added to the National Register of Historic Places in 1999.

It was destroyed by a fire in November 2007.
