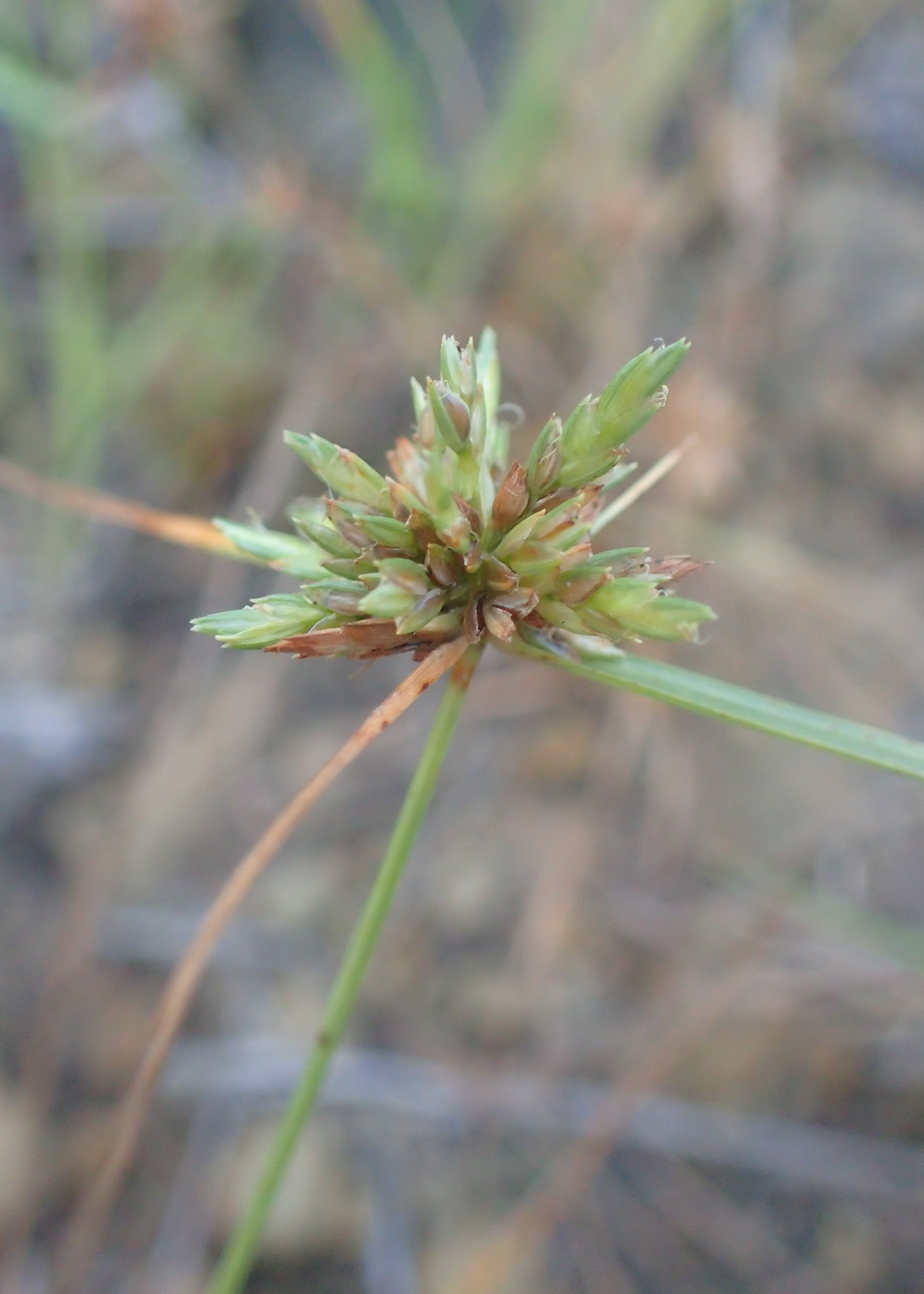

Scientific classification
- Kingdom: Plantae
- Clade: Tracheophytes
- Clade: Angiosperms
- Clade: Monocots
- Clade: Commelinids
- Order: Poales
- Family: Cyperaceae
- Genus: Cyperus
- Species: C. lupulinus

Binomial name
- Cyperus lupulinus (Spreng.) Marcks

Synonyms
- Scirpus lupulinus Spreng.

= Cyperus lupulinus =

Great Plains flatsedge

Species of plant

Cyperus lupulinus, the Great Plains flatsedge, is a plant species native to North America. It is widespread across southeastern Canada and the central and northeastern United States as far west as Wyoming, Colorado and New Mexico, with more isolated populations reported in Washington (Asotin County), Idaho (Idaho County) and Oregon (Wallowa County). It grows in open, sun-lit locations such as fields, prairies, roadsides, farms, etc.

== Description ==
Cyperus lupulinusis a perennial herb up to 50 cm (20 in) tall, spreading by means of underground rhizomes. Culms are triangular in cross-section. Spikes are densely clustered into a more or less spherical clump. Achenes are dark brown, almost black, egg-shaped, about 2 mm (5/64 in) across.

== Taxonomy ==
Two subspecies are accepted:

- Cyperus lupulinus subsp. lupulinus - Floral scales greater than 2.5 mm, not clasping achenes; spikelets with 5-22 scales each
- Cyperus lupulinus subsp. macilentus (Fernald) Marcks - Floral scales less than 2.5 mm, clasping achenes; spikelets with 3-7 scales each

== See also ==
- List of Cyperus species
