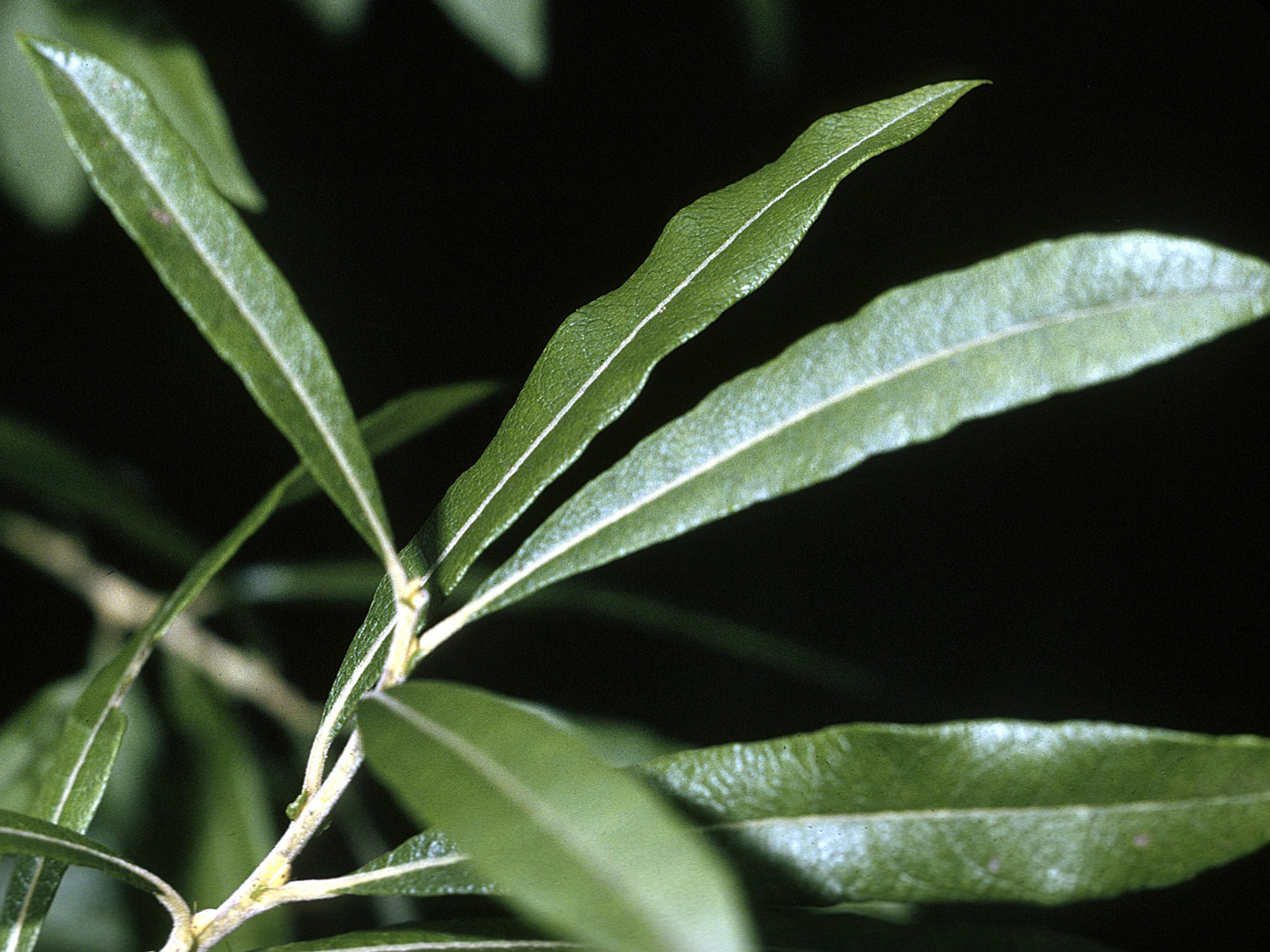

Scientific classification
- Kingdom: Plantae
- Clade: Tracheophytes
- Clade: Angiosperms
- Clade: Eudicots
- Clade: Rosids
- Order: Malpighiales
- Family: Salicaceae
- Genus: Salix
- Species: S. humilis

Binomial name
- Salix humilis Marshall

= Salix humilis =

Species of shrub

Salix humilis, known as prairie willow, is a species of willow native to the United States and Canada, east of the Rockies.

Male and female flowers are found on separate plants. The green silky catkins appear before the leaves emerge in spring.

== Description ==
S. humilis is a shrub, 2–12 feet tall, which often forms thickets. The stems are yellowish to brown. The gray-green to blue-green foliage has insignificant fall color. The leaves may be oblanceolate, obovate, or elliptic in shape. They range in size between 1.5 and 11.5 centimeters (0.6 to 4.5 inches) in length and 0.6 to 3 (0.23 to 1.18 inches) centimeters in width.

== Habitat ==
This species has been observed in areas with loamy sand, as well as specific habitat types such as pine flatwoods and along pond shorelines. Individuals have also been observed occurring in areas that are or had previously been disturbed, such as within burned pine woods or along hiking trails.
