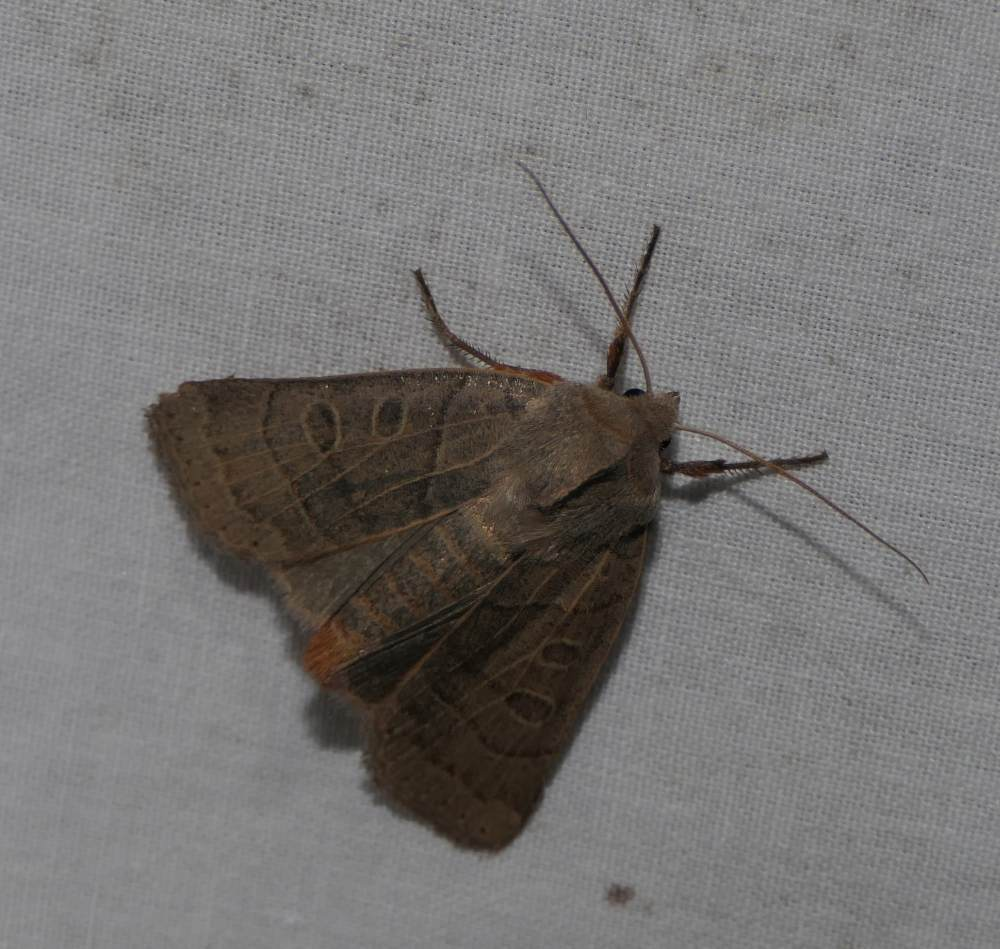

Scientific classification
- Kingdom: Animalia
- Phylum: Arthropoda
- Class: Insecta
- Order: Lepidoptera
- Superfamily: Noctuoidea
- Family: Noctuidae
- Genus: Chaetaglaea
- Species: C. cerata

Binomial name
- Chaetaglaea cerata Franclemont, 1943

= Chaetaglaea cerata =

Species of moth

Chaetaglaea cerata, commonly known as the waxed sallow, is a species of moth in the family Noctuidae. It was first described by John G. Franclemont in 1943 and is found in North America, where it has been recorded from Connecticut, Indiana, Maine, Michigan, Ohio, Ontario, Pennsylvania and Wisconsin.

The wingspan is about 35 mm. The forewings are pale greyish tan with whitish veins. It is listed as a species of special concern in the US state of Connecticut. The larvae feed on blueberry, scrub oak and species in the genus Prunus.
