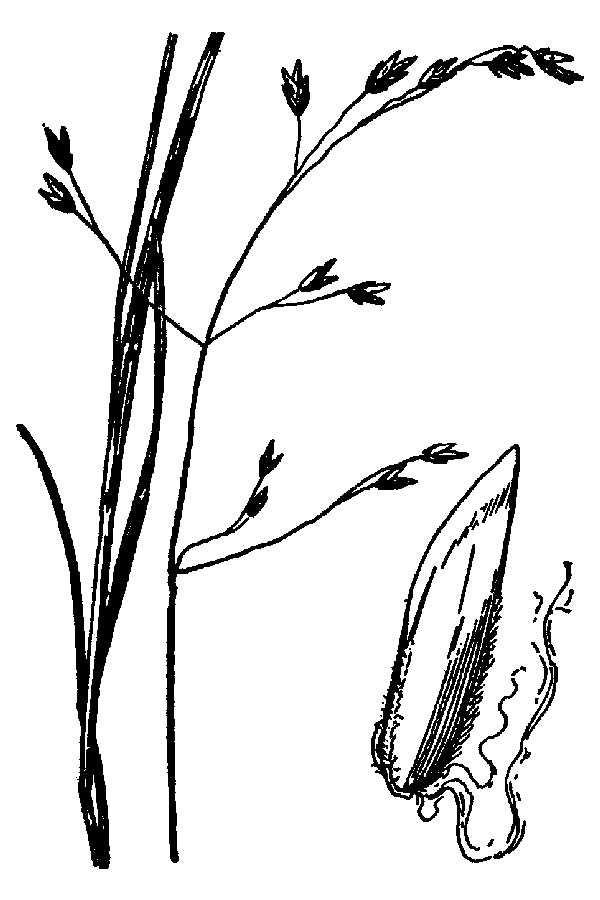
- 1950 illustration

Conservation status
- Vulnerable (NatureServe)

Scientific classification
- Kingdom: Plantae
- Clade: Embryophytes
- Clade: Tracheophytes
- Clade: Angiosperms
- Clade: Monocots
- Clade: Commelinids
- Order: Poales
- Family: Poaceae
- Subfamily: Pooideae
- Genus: Poa
- Species: P. paludigena

Binomial name
- Poa paludigena Fernald & Wiegand

= Poa paludigena =

Species of grass

Poa paludigena is a species of grass known by the common names bog bluegrass, marsh bluegrass, slender marsh bluegrass, and Patterson's bluegrass. It is native to the northeastern United States.

This perennial grass forms loose tufts of slender, weak, pale green stems up to 55 centimeters tall. It has no stolons and rarely has small rhizomes. The thin leaves are no more than 2 millimeters wide and 10 centimeters long. The inflorescence is an open panicle of just a few small spikelets. It is difficult to distinguish from related species without microscopic examination. It is similar to other Poa such as Poa compressa.

This grass grows in cool wetland habitat types such as bogs, swamps, and wet meadows. It may grow in mucky spots with Sphagnum moss and spring-fed swamp habitat dominated by Fraxinus nigra and Betula alleghaniensis. It is not an aquatic plant, but it is found in very wet environments. Other species in the habitat may include Alnus incana ssp. rugosa, Calamagrostis canadensis, Cypripedium reginae, Doellingeria umbellata, Eupatorium perfoliatum, Galium asprellum, Geum rivale, Impatiens capensis, Larix laricina, Onoclea sensibilis, Polygonum sagittatum, Rhamnus alnifolius, Symphyotrichum lanceolatum, Symphyotrichum puniceum, and Thelypteris palustris.

Potential threats to the species include destruction or degradation of the fragile wetland communities where it occurs, but none of the occurrences appear to be in imminent danger of extirpation.
