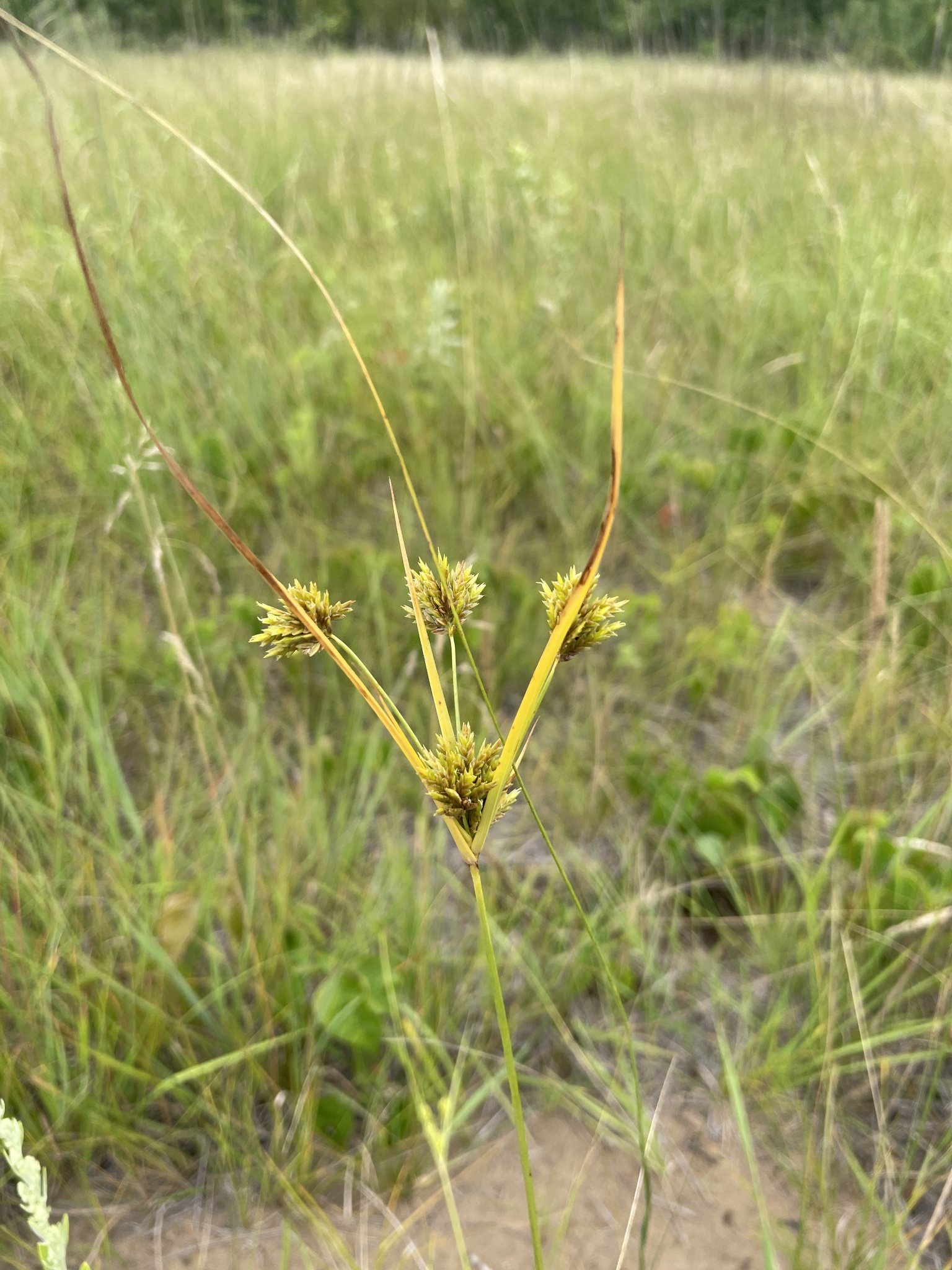
- In Minnesota

Scientific classification
- Kingdom: Plantae
- Clade: Embryophytes
- Clade: Tracheophytes
- Clade: Spermatophytes
- Clade: Angiosperms
- Clade: Monocots
- Clade: Commelinids
- Order: Poales
- Family: Cyperaceae
- Genus: Cyperus
- Species: C. schweinitzii

Binomial name
- Cyperus schweinitzii Torr.

= Cyperus schweinitzii =

Species of sedge

Cyperus schweinitzii is a species of sedge that is native to parts of North America.

== Taxonomy ==
Cyperus schweinitzii was named and described by the American botanist John Torrey in 1836. As of February 2026, the botanical name Cyperus schweinitzii Torr. is widely accepted.

== See also ==
- List of Cyperus species

== Bibliography ==
- Torrey, John (1836). "Monograph of the North American Cyperaceae". Annals of the Lyceum of Natural History of New York. 3: 239–448.
