= Schenectady High School =

Location
- 1445 The Plaza; Schenectady, New York 12308
- Coordinates: 42.814°N 73.910°W

Information
- Type: Urban public high school
- Established: 1958
- School district: Schenectady City Schools
- Principal: Dennis Green
- Staff: 217.37 (FTE)
- Grades: 9–12
- Student to teacher ratio: 13.16
- Colors: Red, white and blue
- Mascot: Patriot
- Nicknames: "Schenectady High", SHS, "Home of the Patriots"
- Website: Official site

Schenectady High School is a high school located at 1445 The Plaza in Schenectady, New York, USA. It was founded in 1992 through the merger of Linton High School and Mont Pleasant High School. It is the only high school in the Schenectady City School District.

Among the programs at SHS are the International Baccalaureate Program and the CISCO program. Schenectady High has a number of schools, including the Fine Art House, the Math, Science and Technology House, the GE Scholars School of Humanities and Culture and the Global Commerce House.

The mission statement of the school is "today a learner, tomorrow a leader."

== John Sayles School of Fine Arts ==
The John Sayles School of Fine Arts (JSSFA) is a smaller learning community of approximately 650 students at Schenectady High School. Carrying the name of one of Schenectady's famous district graduates internationally known filmmaker, John Sayles. The school provides an integrated Regents high school curriculum with an interdisciplinary focus in visual art, music, theatre and dance. Schenectady High School, with an enrollment of approximately 2,900 students, is divided into five communities, including the Sayles School. The Sayles School of Fine Arts provides unique arts opportunities in the region. The John Sayles School of Fine Arts was recently awarded the John F. Kennedy Center for the Performing Arts National Schools of Distinction in Arts Education and its students performed on the Millennium Stage at the Kennedy Center.

Students in the Sayles School have the chance to study visual art, music, dance, media arts and theatre. Consistent and sequential coursework provides students at all ability levels opportunities to explore the arts. Coursework is taught during the school day and includes classes in Acting, Tap, Jazz Dance, Drawing, Piano, Film making, Concert Choir, Serenaders, Women's Choir, Chamber Choi and International Baccalaureate Music and Art. All subjects and grade levels integrate the arts. There are four grade level teams including teachers in English, Math, Science, Social Studies, Reading and Foreign Language.

The Sayles School of Fine Arts is housed in a 42,000-square-foot (3,900 m^{2}) wing at Schenectady High School, built as an addition in 2001. The facilities include a Black Box Theater, Dance Studio, Video Production Studio, Media Arts Lab, Piano Lab, Music Studios, Art Studios and Gallery. The JSSFA is home to the Blue Roses Theatre Company; the district television station, Schenectady City Schools TV (SCS-TV); and the Henry and Miriam Butzel Gallery.

== Notable people ==
Alumni

- Billy Connors – pitcher and pitching coach for New York Yankees and other teams, Class of 1959
- Fred Isabella – dentist and member of the New York State Senate; Mont Pleasant graduate
- Barry Kramer – judge and basketball player for NYU and for NBA's San Francisco Warriors and New York Knicks, later in ABA for New York Nets; Linton Class of 1960
- Mark Lyons – professional basketball player, top scorer in the Israel Basketball Premier League in both 2015 and 2017
- Pat Riley – University of Kentucky and NBA basketball player; later 5-time NBA championship coach and executive, member of Basketball Hall of Fame; Linton Class of 1963
- James Thomas – college basketball player at University of Texas; former NBA player played professionally in Italy; attended and graduated from Hargrave Academy in Chatham, Virginia
- Casper Wells – outfielder for Seattle Mariners

Faculty

- Virginia Starcher – member of West Virginia House of Delegates
