= Union Street Historic District (Schenectady, New York) =

Historic district in New York, United States

- U.S. National Register of Historic Places
- U.S. Historic district
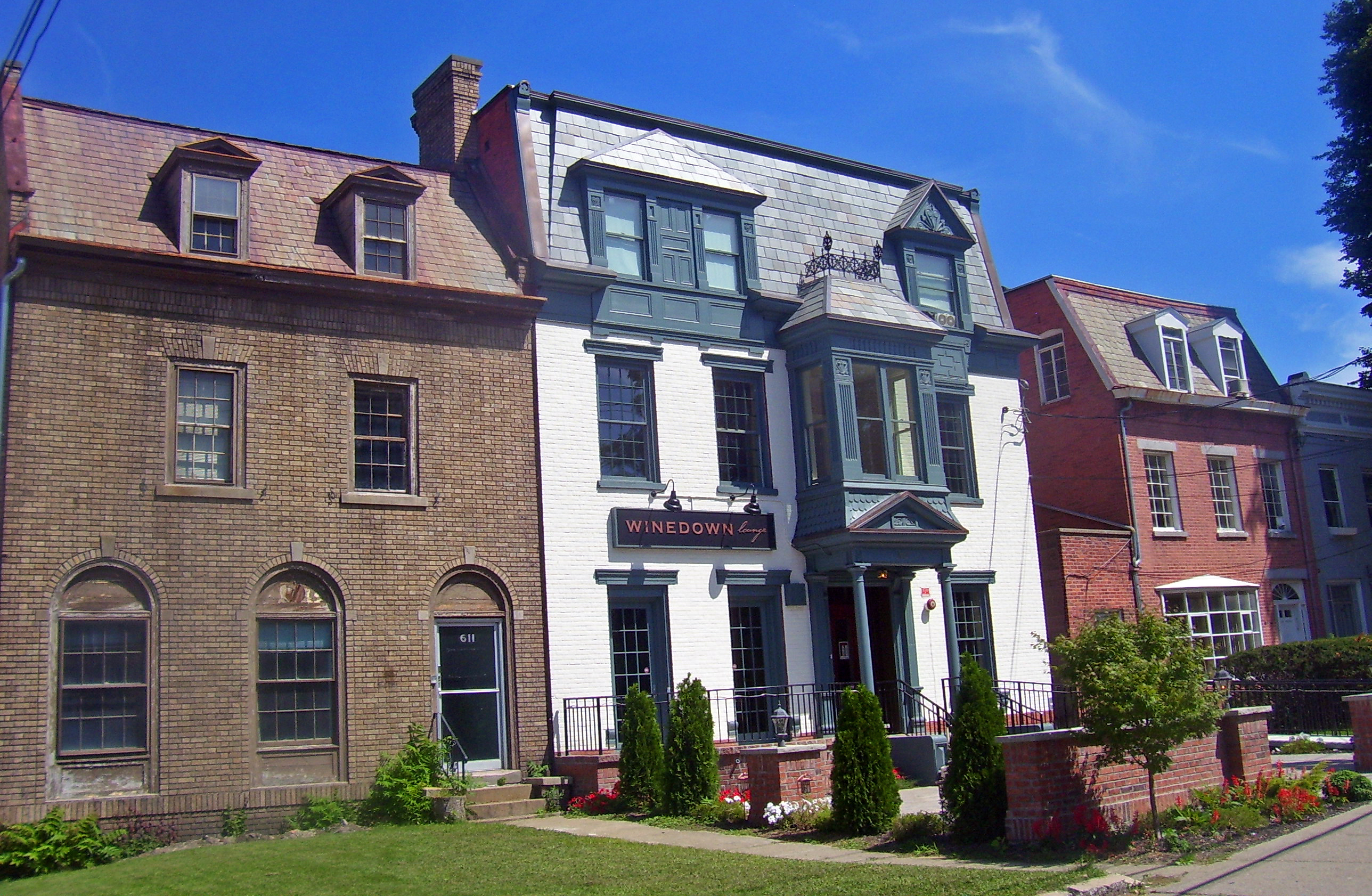
- Walter McQueen House, ca. 1887, at 613 Union, with flanking houses from 1850s, 2008

- Location within New York Location within the United States
- Location: Schenectady, NY
- Coordinates: 42°48′57″N 73°56′11″W
- Area: 65 acres (26 ha)
- Built: 19th century
- Architectural style: Various 19th-century styles
- NRHP reference No.: 82001268
- Added to NRHP: November 17, 1982

The Union Street Historic District extends along a section of that street in Schenectady, New York, United States. Covering roughly two miles (3.2 km) of both sides of the street, it includes 184 buildings in its 65 acres (26 ha).

Over the course of the 19th century, the city's development followed Union, one of the major through roads to the east, as it industrialized and expanded out of its colonial core on the banks of the Mohawk River. In 1982 the historic district was recognized and listed on the National Register of Historic Places.

== Geography ==
The district's western terminus is at the former New York Central Railroad tracks (now used by Amtrak and CSX) just north of the train station and southeast of the Stockade Historic District; from there it extends eastward to Phoenix Avenue, one block short of where NY 146 joins the street. It is defined as street addresses 306-1364 on the south side and 307-1355 on the north. Two small portions of Nott Terrace and Union Avenue are also included.

Union College, roughly one-third of the way between termini, had a tremendous influence on the district's development and bisects it both historically and by land use. On the west, closer to downtown Schenectady and the Stockade neighborhood, the oldest in the city, buildings are a mix of pre-1850 commercial, institutional and residential properties, mainly brick. East of the college the street becomes more uniformly residential, with frame the preferred material for houses built in Victorian styles from the later 19th and early 20th centuries. Only twelve of the buildings in the district are considered non-contributing.

== History ==
Schenectady, founded by 17th-century Dutch settlers as a trading outpost to deal with the Iroquois tribes to the west, remained a small riverside village not much larger than the present Stockade District for the years after the Revolution. Two events in the early 19th century began to change that. Union College, which had been operating out of a building at Union and South Ferry streets, moved to its present campus in 1814. Nine years later, the Erie Canal was completed, bringing more traffic past the city, added to by the railroads as they began to develop in the next decade.

The growth this spurred began to follow the toll road that is today Union Street, which at the time connected Schenectady with Watervliet and Troy to the east. At first it was related to the college, which owned the land on the north side of Union and subdivided it to homeowners. To allow visitors to view the college's new campus, the first planned campus in the United States, college president Eliphalet Nott stipulated that houses built between Barrett Street and Seward Place be set back "the width of an average veranda" (about 20 feet (6.1 m)) in order to allow views of the campus from the western approach. This is still in evidence today, and the area has some of the district's notable buildings, like the college president's residence (possibly built by Nott) at 709 Union.

In 1848, the Schenectady Locomotive Works was built on Jay Street. This triggered the construction of workers' housing and buildings to service them, like Mercy Hospital (614 Union) and the German Methodist Church (404 Union), on the blocks closer to Erie Boulevard. The company's president, John Ellis, built his mansion at 802 Union, helping to establish the eastern blocks as a desirable residential area. After his death, his family sold some of the estate, and one of the parcels was bought to establish St. John the Evangelist Church, with its unique steel-and-glass spire. The mansion is now the church's rectory.

The last spur to the growth of Union Street was the rise of the city's other major native manufacturer, General Electric. Started when Thomas Edison moved his machine works to Schenectady in 1886, the company grew into the leading manufacturer of electric appliances by the 20th century. Many of its executives built houses along Union, where the company had electrified the streetcar line. By the 1920s this development had brought the city's eastern frontier to Phoenix Avenue, when the Depression stopped most new private construction. It resumed later in different styles and uses, but the current district remains relatively intact as it was at that point, with little infill.

It is one of five local historic districts designated by the City of Schenectady. It comes under the purview of its Historic Commission, a seven-member body that meets once a month. Under the city's zoning regulations, any change to a historic property in a district that is visible from a public right-of-way must be approved by the commission.

== Significant contributing properties ==
None of the houses or other buildings in the district has been separately listed on the National Register, either before or since its creation. Some are significant within it.

- President's House, 709 Union Street. A two-story Gothic Revival home built ca. 1860, possibly for Eliphalet Nott, that serves as the residence for the president of Union College.
- General Francis Fisk House, 711 Union Street. A frame Greek Revival house built ca. 1840, this is one of the oldest houses in the district west of downtown.
- St. John the Evangelist Church, 814 Union Street. Built in 1899, this church features a distinctive 230-foot (70 m) steel-and-glass central spire, with a view towards the college's Nott Memorial from the front. Former Ellis mansion nearby serves as the church's rectory.
- Willis Hanson Estate, 821 Union Street and 20½ Union Avenue. 1888 three-story Queen Anne estate and 1900 carriage house built for wealthy local businessman.

== See also ==
- National Register of Historic Places listings in Schenectady County, New York
- Woodlawn, Schenectady, New York
