= Stockade Historic District =

Historic district in New York, United States

- U.S. National Register of Historic Places
- U.S. Historic district
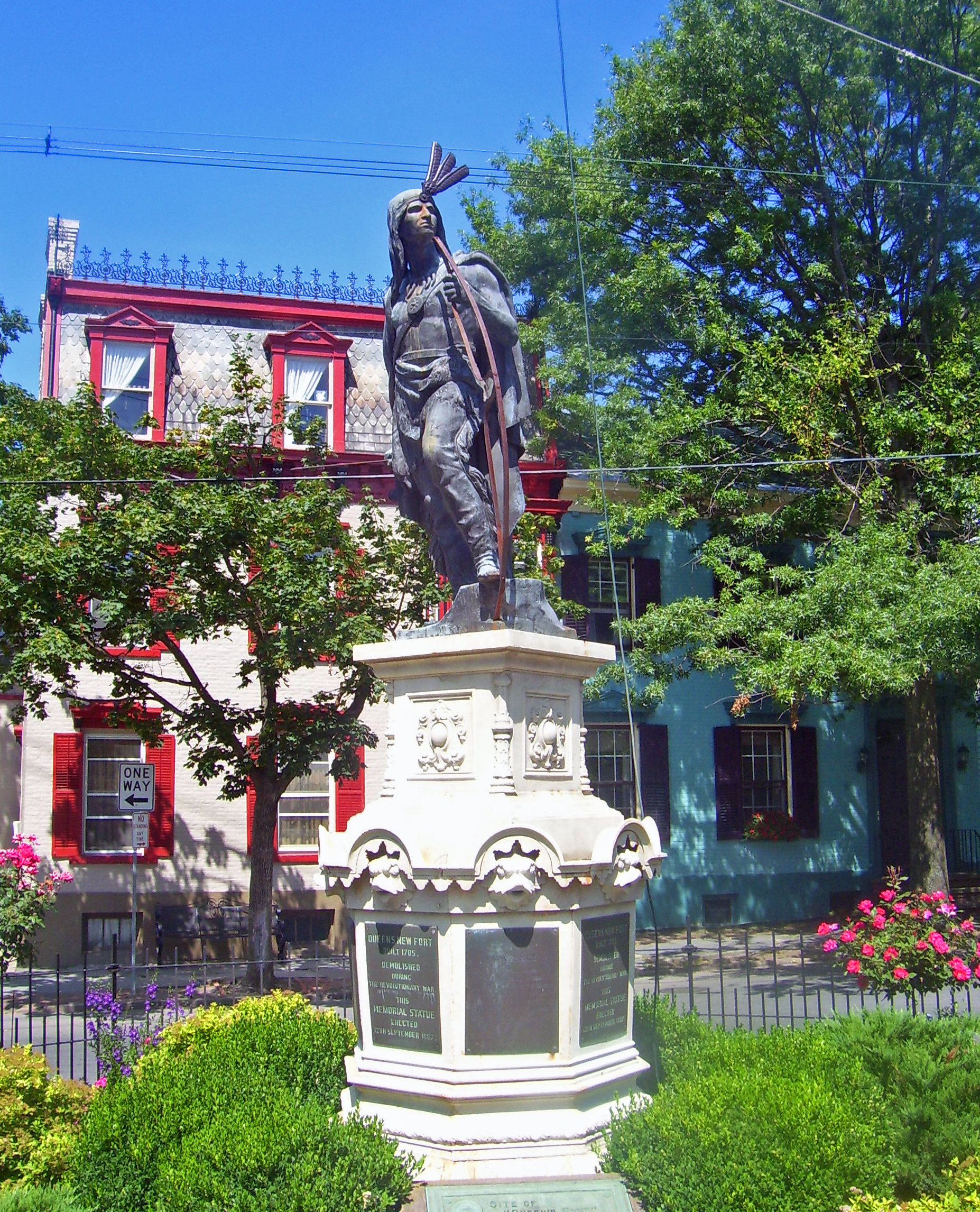
- Statue of Lawrence the Indian at center of Stockade District, 2008

- Location within New York Location within the United States
- Location: Roughly bounded by Mohawk River, RR tracks, and Union St. (original), and 16, 18, and 20 S. Church St. (increase), in Schenectady, New York
- Coordinates: 42°49′7″N 73°56′47″W
- Area: 82 acres (33 ha)
- Built: 1735–1800
- Architect: Multiple
- NRHP reference No.: 73001267 and 84002963
- Added to NRHP: April 03, 1973 (original); September 07, 1984 (increase)

The Stockade Historic District is located in the northwest corner of Schenectady, New York, United States, on the banks of the Mohawk River. It is the oldest neighborhood in the city, continuously inhabited for more than 300 years. Union College first held classes in a building within the district, and later it would be one of the termini of an early suspension bridge that was, at the time, the longest in North America. Joseph C. Yates, the 7th Governor of New York and founding trustee of Union College, and Elizabeth V. Gillette, a physician and the first woman from upstate New York elected to the New York State Assembly, were residents of the Stockade.

It contains a wide variety of Dutch and English 17th- and 18th-century buildings, many with later embellishments and additions. The National Park Service has described it as "the highest concentration of historic period homes in the country," with over 40 older than 200 years. The Stockade was New York's first local historic district, when it was recognized by the city council in 1962.

It was listed on the National Register of Historic Places in 1973 and its boundaries were increased slightly in 1984. The city and an active neighborhood association, the first founded in Schenectady, work to protect its historic character.

== Geography ==
The Stockade District is a roughly wedge-shaped area at Schenectady's northwest corner, 82 acres (33 ha) in area. It is bounded by the Mohawk on the north, the Binne Kill on the west and the former New York Central Railroad tracks, now used by Amtrak and CSX, on the east. Its southern boundary is mostly defined by the rear line of properties on the south side of Union Street, except for Washington Avenue, where the entire street is included all the way to State Street (NY 5), and a section of Church Street added by the boundary increase.

On its southeast corner it borders the Union Street Historic District, providing a historic corridor which links it to Union College and the city's other two historic districts, the GE Realty Plot and Union Triangle. Residential and industrial areas are located to the east across the tracks. To the south is the western section of downtown Schenectady. Riverside Park (parkland) is located at the shore of the river, (northwest side). The village of Scotia is located directly across the river.

The district is largely flat, reflecting the nearby river. It is densely developed, mostly with small two-story attached houses, and is centered on the intersection of Ferry, Front and Green streets, where a circular plaza is built around a statue of Lawrence the Indian, a Mohawk who helped restore the settlement after an early catastrophe.

== History ==
For the colonial period and afterwards, the history of the Stockade District is synonymous with the history of Schenectady. Later, as the city industrialized and grew far beyond it, the district retained a distinct identity and sense of community within itself.

=== 17th and 18th centuries ===
A group of Dutch settlers, mostly merchants and fur traders looking to do business with Native Americans, settled the banks of the Mohawk in an area between the present Ferry, Front and State streets and Washington Avenue in 1661. This group of twelve houses surrounded by a wooden stockade, 200 Dutch feet (about 187 feet, or 56.6 m) on a side is considered the founding of the city of Schenectady. After the 1674 Treaty of Westminster ended the Third Anglo-Dutch War the settlement, like all established by the Dutch in New Netherland, came under British control as part of the Province of New York.

The small frontier settlement was almost wiped out in 1690 during King William's War, the first in the series of conflicts known as the French and Indian Wars. French troops and their Algonquin and Sault allies, retaliating for a series of British-backed Iroquois raids on their territory, were on their way to an assault on Fort Orange at present-day Albany when their scouts found that Schenectady's stockade was almost minimally staffed, and changed their plans to attack this target of opportunity.

In the course of the ensuing Schenectady massacre, many of the houses and barns were burned and most of the inhabitants of the village either killed or taken to Montreal as prisoners. Local members of the Mohawk tribe, in particular, one who had become known among the settlers as Lawrence, encouraged the Dutch to rebuild.

By 1692 the community had been rebuilt and repopulated with a mixture of English, Scottish and Dutch settlers. The stockade was rebuilt and by 1704 took in College Street on the east and Cowhorn Creek on the south. The French and Indian Wars continued into the next century, ending in 1763, by which time the stockade had been extended to the river on the north. The costs of retaining control over the North American colonies eventually led Parliament to consider different taxes on the colonial economy to pay the mounting costs. These, in turn, led to discontent in the colonies, and one of the first "Liberty!" protest flags over the Stamp Act 1765 was raised over the Dutch Reformed Church then at the corner of Church and Union streets. The flag now in the Schenectady Historical Society building on Washington Avenue.

During the Revolutionary War Schenectady served as headquarters for several of the local Committees of Safety. George Washington visited the area at least three times, due to its strategic importance. After independence, the stockade, which had begun to deteriorate from neglect during the war, was dismantled. Only some of the footings remain, mostly buried. The village continued to grow as the main point of departure for travel to the west. Buildings and wharves along the riverfront and the Binne Kill accommodated the travelers and cargo that came overland from Albany and boarded bateaux for the trip west to Lake Erie.

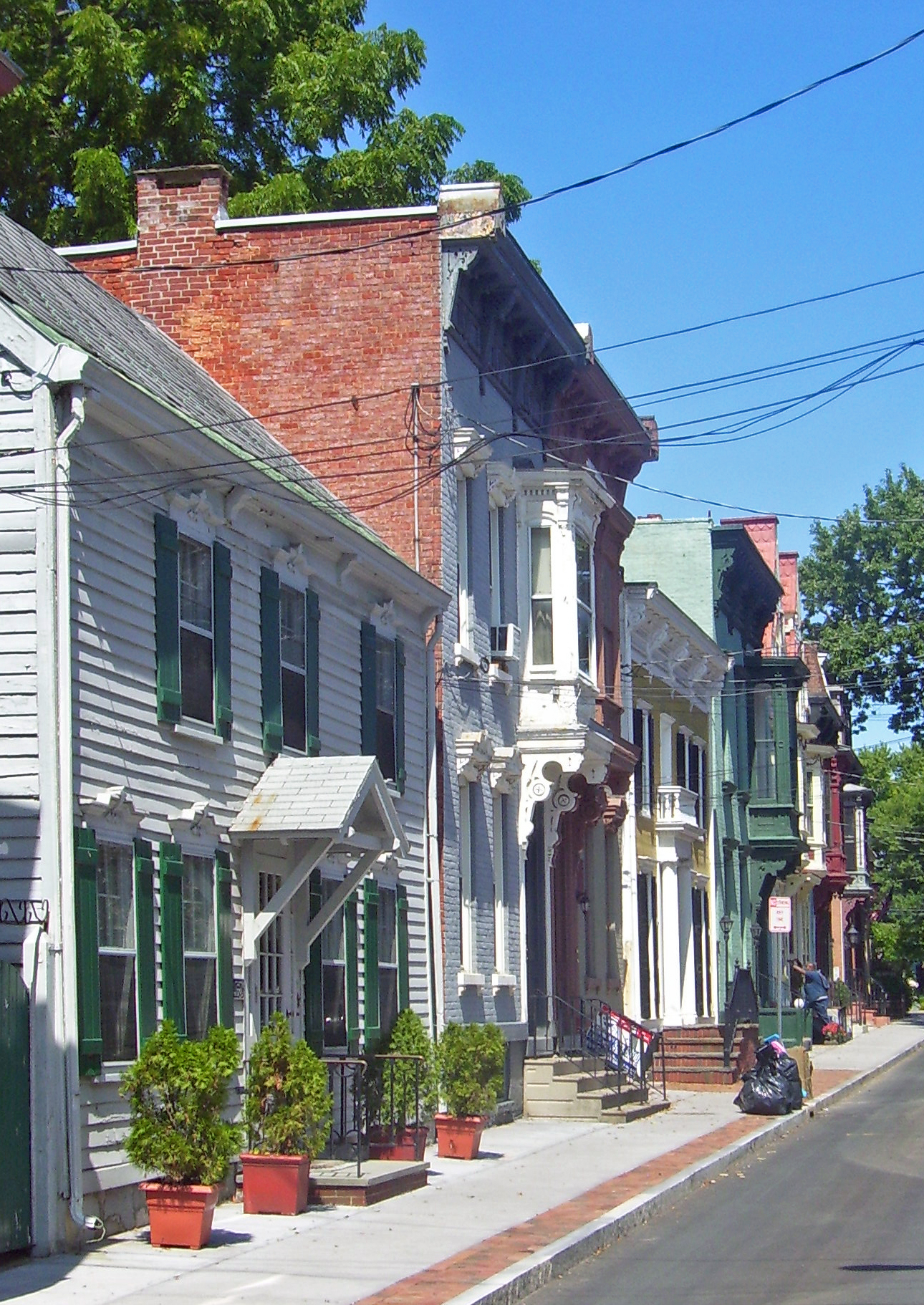
Houses on North Ferry Street modified with 19th-century additions and decoration

=== 19th century ===
In the early 19th century engineer Theodore Burr, cousin of Aaron, having built one of the first significant crossings of the Hudson River at Waterford, turned his attentions to the Mohawk. He decided to build a wooden suspension bridge, using planks of local timber as the cables. A triple span across the 800 feet (240 m) of river between Washington Avenue and Scotia was completed in early 1808 but then washed away. Burr added a fourth span, and this time the bridge stood up to the river.

The Revolution had led citizens to demand services a nation could provide, among them higher education. Union College was established in 1779, before the war had even ended, but was not formally recognized with a state charter (the first issued by the state Board of Regents) until 1795. Its first building was in the district, at the corner of Ferry and Union streets, later College and Union. It was America's first non-denominational college. In 1814 the college moved to its present location, the first planned college campus in the country.

In 1819 a fire destroyed two hundred buildings in this area. Six years later, during the rebuilding, the Erie Canal was completed, and most activity moved west to the vicinity of State Street, outside of the district, sparing the residential properties that make up the bulk of today's Stockade. As Schenectady began to grow due to industrialization, it grew eastward along Union Street (the main road to Troy and Watervliet at the time) and the canal, as the American Locomotive Company and General Electric made it "The City that Hauls and Lights the World".

=== 20th century ===
Connecticut native Elizabeth Gillette moved to Union Street to start her medical practice in 1900. Two decades later, she was elected to the state assembly, the first woman elected to the state legislature from upstate and the only Democrat ever elected to that body from Schenectady's second district. She served a single term and returned to medicine, retiring in 1960.

Theodore Burr's bridge burned down in 1909 and was replaced with the first of the current bridges nearby that carry Route 5 to Scotia. One of the original stone abutments can be seen where Washington Avenue reaches the river. When the Erie Canal was finally replaced by the New York State Barge Canal, portions were reused for the railroad bridge.

By the mid-20th century, the neighborhood had gone into noticeable decline, and some of its buildings, such as the original Surrogate's Court building, were demolished. Residents who had become aware of its historic importance formed the Stockade Association in 1957 and, five years later, successfully lobbied the city to pass a zoning ordinance creating the historic district, the first one created in the state.

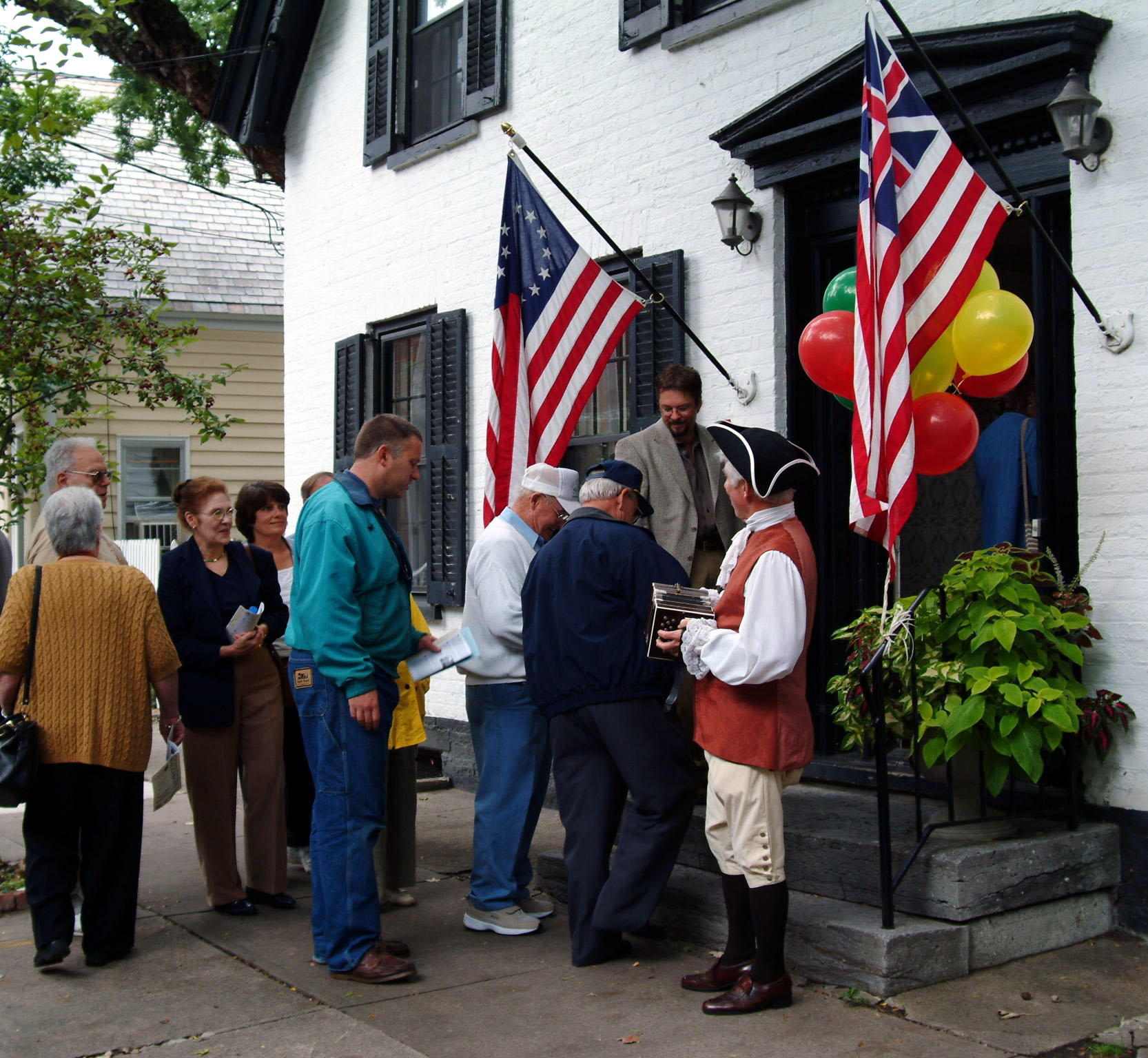
Guide in period costume welcomes guests at open house

== Preservation ==
The neighborhood is one of four historic districts recognized by the city of Schenectady. It comes under the purview of its Historic Commission, a seven-member body that meets once a month. Under the city's zoning regulations, any change to a historic building in a district that is visible from a public right-of-way must be approved by the commission.

Within the neighborhood, the Historic Stockade Association works to organize residents and help preserve not only the historic nature of the neighborhood but its sense of community. It publishes and distributes a newsletter, The Stockade Spy and organizes tours and other special events in the neighborhood. Some other special events in the neighborhood are informal, such as the sing-along to the pink flamingos that a person or persons unknown has been placing in front of the statue of Lawrence every Valentine's Day for the last decade.

== See also ==
- National Register of Historic Places listings in Schenectady County, New York
- Woodlawn, Schenectady, New York
- General Electric Realty Plot
