= Schenectady City School District =

School district in the U.S. state of New York

Address
- 108 Education Drive Schenectady, NY, 12303; United States
- Coordinates: 42°47′51.09″N 73°56′22.82″W

District information
- Type: Public city school district
- Grades: Pre-K—12
- Established: 1854; 172 years ago
- Superintendent: Superintendent - Dr. Carlos Cotto, Jr.
- Budget: $204,653,930

Students and staff
- Students: 9,256 (2018-2019)
- Athletic conference: Section II
- District mascot: Patriots
- Colors: Red and blue

Other information
- Website: www.schenectadyschools.org

The Schenectady City School District is a public city school district in the city of Schenectady in Schenectady County, New York. The district has 17 operating school buildings and is a component district of the Capital Region Boards of Cooperative Educational Services (BOCES). It was established in 1854 and served 9,256 students in pre-kindergarten through twelfth grade in the 2018–2019 school year.

As of 2008-2009, the district employed 728.8 (on an FTE basis) faculty members and the student-to-teacher ratio was 13.1. As of 2009, the district had the largest population of any school district in the Capital District.

== Administration ==
=== Board of education ===
The Board of Education (BOE) is the authoritative legislative body of the school district. It approves policy and funding; sets committees and district priorities; and approves employment (including the superintendent) within the district, among other things. The BOE is made up of seven members. The elected Board of Education members for the 2020-2021 school year are John Foley (President), Cathy Lewis (Vice President), Andrew Chestnut, Nohelani Etienne, Princella Learry, Ann Reilly, and Bernice Rivera. The clerk of the board is Martha Morris. The board of education typically meets the first and third Wednesdays of each month.

Members are elected by district residents that are registered to vote. The election takes place on the third Tuesday in May annually. This is the same day as the budget vote; legally, it is known as the Annual Meeting. Any resident may run for a board seat once they deliver to the Board Clerk a petition containing a minimum number of signatures from district residents and meet specific requirements set forth by the state (namely, residence within the district, the ability to read and write, and a willingness to serve). Board members are not paid for their services to the district.

=== Superintendent ===
The interim superintendent of schools is Dr. Aaron Bochniak, district director for planning and accountability, who was named interim superintendent on March 25, 2020, following the resignation of former superintendent Laurence T. Spring in March 2020. The Schenectady City School District began a superintendent search in July 2020, with the goal of filling the position by November 2020.

The superintendent is the chief administrative officer of the district and is responsible for the day-to-day operations of the district in addition to administering policies of the board.

== School buildings ==
As of 2019, Schenectady City School District operated 11 elementary schools, 3 middle schools, and 1 high school.

Elementary schools (11):

- Hamilton Elementary School
- Howe Elementary School]
- W.C. Keane Elementary School
- Lincoln Elementary Community School
- Dr. Martin Luther King, Jr. Elementary School
- Paige Elementary
- Pleasant Valley Elementary
- Van Corlaer Elementary School
- Woodlawn Elementary School
- Yates Elementary School
- Jesse T. Zoller Elementary School

Middle Schools:

- Central Park Middle School
- Mont Pleasant Middle School
- Oneida Middle School

High Schools (1) :

- Schenectady High School, which comprises three buildings:
1. Steinmetz Career and Leadership Academy
2. Schenectady High School @ Washington Irving Adult & Continuing Education Center
3. Schenectady High School

The former Franklin School was added to the National Register of Historic Places in 1983 and the former Brandywine Avenue School in 1999. In 2017, the former Elmer Avenue Elementary School was shut down and sold by the district as a part of a plan to convert the building into apartments.

== Student body ==
=== Ethnicity ===
Enrollment By Grade:

- Total Student Body: 9,256 (100%)
  - American Indian or Alaska Native: 12 (0%)
- Black or African American: 2,837 (31%)
- Hispanic or Latino: 1,975 (21%)
- Asian or Native Hawaiian/Other Pacific Islander: 1,719 (19%)
- White: 2,007 (22%)
- Multiracial: 706 (8%)

=== Enrollment ===
Students during the 2018–2019 school year:

- Elementary (Pre-K - 5 & Ungraded Elementary): 4,434 (47.9%)
- Middle School (6 - 8): 2,097 (22.7%)
- High School (9 - 12 & Ungraded Secondary):2,725 (29.4%)

=== Testing scores ===
Data of passing rates (≥ 65%) for students taking Regents exams in the 2008–2009 school year:

- Comprehensive English: 67%
- Math A: 37%
- Math B: 48%
- Integrated Algebra: 53%
- Geometry: 54%
- Global History and Geography: 50%
- US History and Government: 69%
- Living Environment: 78%
- Earth Science: 63%
- Chemistry: 54%
- Physics: 71%
- Comprehensive French: 96%
- Comprehensive Spanish: 97%

=== Other statistics ===
According to reports, more than 75% of the class of 2009 intended on attending either a two-year or four-year college after graduating high school, about 40% of which planned on attending a four-year institution. The following is additional data for the 2008–2009 school year:

- Attendance rate: 91%
- Dropout rate: 4%

== Curriculum ==
The district follows the general curriculum set forth by the Board of Regents of the University of the State of New York, under the direction of the Commissioner of Education and the New York State Education Department. To graduate, a student must have at least four credits each of English and social studies; three credits each of math and science; two credits each of physical education and foreign language classes; one credit of fine art; and one-half credit of health. The student must also have at least 22 credits overall and pass a prescribed amount of state tests to receive a Regents diploma. For all subjects except physical education and health, a full-year course is equal to one credit. Each year of physical education is equal to one-half credit and one-half year of health class is equal to the required amount of health credit.

== See also ==
- New York State Education Department
- University of the State of New York
- Regents Examinations
- Board of Cooperative Educational Services (BOCES)
- List of school districts in New York
- New York State School Boards Association
- National School Boards Association
- No Child Left Behind Act
