= List of mayors of Schenectady, New York =

Joseph C. Yates was the first mayor of Schenectady, New York. John Isaac De Graff was the first mayor elected by popular vote.

Gary R. McCarthy has been the current mayor since 2011.

== List of mayors ==
- 1798 — Joseph C. Yates (Democratic-Republican, 1798-1806; Clintonian Faction, 1806-08) — Elected yearly by common council; Later Governor of New York.
- 1808 — John Yates (Democratic-Republican) Elected twice by common council to 1st two terms
- 1810 — Abraham Oathout (Federalist) Elected once by common council — Colonel in the American Revolution, involved in the Continental Congress, and helped found Union College.
- 1811 — John Yates (Democratic-Republican) Elected twice by common council to third & fourth terms
- 1813 — Maus Schermerhorn (Federalist) Elected four times by common council
- 1817 — Henry Yates, Jr. (Democratic-Republican/Bucktail Faction) Elected eight times by common council
- 1825 — Isaac Maus Schermerhorn (Democratic-Republican/Clintonian) Elected once by common council to 1st term
- 1826 — David Boyd (Democratic-Republican/Bucktail Faction, 1826-28; Jacksonian, 1828) Elected twice by common council
- 1828 — Isaac Maus Schermerhorn (Adams Supporter, 1828-30; Nationalist Republican, 1830-31) Elected thrice by common council to 2nd-4th terms
- 1831 — Archibald Craig (Party unknown - needs more research) - Elected by common council once
- 1832 — John Isaac DeGraff (Jacksonian, 1832-35; Democrat, 1835) Elected twice by common council, popularly elected in 1834 to one-year term (first three terms)
- 1835 — Archibald Ladley Linn (Whig) Popularly elected to one-year term (1st term)
- 1836 — John Isaac DeGraff (Democrat) Popularly elected to one-year term (4th term)
- 1837 — Samuel William Jones (Democrat) Popularly elected to two, one-year terms
- 1839 — Archibald Ladley Linn (Whig) Popularly elected to one-year term (2nd term)
- 1840 — Alexander C. Gibson (Whig, though also listed as Democrat) Popularly elected to two, one-year terms (1st-2nd terms)
- 1842 — John Isaac DeGraff (Democrat) Popularly elected to one-year term (5th term)
- 1843 — Alexander C. Gibson (Whig) Popularly elected to two, one-year terms (3rd-4th terms)
- 1845 — John Isaac DeGraff (Democrat) Popularly elected to one-year term (6th term)
- 1846 — Peter Rowe (Democrat) Popularly elected to two, one-year terms (1st-2nd terms)
- 1848 — James E. Van Horne (Whig) Popularly elected to two, one-year terms
- 1850 — Peter Rowe (Democrat) Popularly elected to one-year term (3rd term)
- 1851 — Mordecai Myers (Democrat) Popularly elected to one-year term (1st term); First Jewish Mayor
- 1852 — Abram A. Van Vorst (Democrat) Popularly elected to two, one-year terms (1st-2nd terms)
- 1854 — Mordecai Myers (Democrat) Popularly elected to one-year term (2nd term), resigned March 21, 1855
- 1855 — Casper F. Hoag (Whig) Member of Council, elected March 26, 1855 by Common (City) Council for remaining weeks of Mayoral term to April
- 1855 — Abel Smith (American/Know-Nothing) Popularly elected to two, one-year terms, first Mayor elected from Know-Nothing Party
- 1857 — Benjamin V. S. Vedder (American/Know-Nothing) Popularly elected to one-year term, second & last Mayor elected from Know-Nothing Party
- 1858 — Alex M. Vedder (Republican) Popularly elected to one-year term, first Republican Mayor
- 1859 — David P. Forrest (Republican) Popularly elected to one-year term
- 1860 — Benjamin F. Potter (Republican) Popularly elected to one-year term
- 1861 — Arthur W. Hunter (Democrat) Popularly elected to two, one-year terms, first to be elected in 1863 to a two-year term (1st-3rd terms)
- 1865 — Andrew McMullen (Democrat) Popularly elected to two, two-year terms
- 1869 — Abram A. Van Vorst (Democrat) Popularly elected to one, two-year term (3rd term)
- 1871 — William J. Van Horne (Republican) Popularly elected to one, two-year term
- 1873 — Arthur W. Hunter (Democrat) Popularly elected to one, two-year term (4th term)
- 1875 — Peter B. Yates (Democrat) Popularly elected to one, two-year term. Died in office July 4, 1876 north of Garrison, NY, on Hudson River train of apoplexy (stroke).
- 1876 — William Howes Smith (Democrat) Succeeded Mayor Yates upon his death, popularly elected to one, two-year term in April 1877
- 1879 — Joseph P. Graham (Republican) Popularly elected to one, two-year term
- 1881 — Abram A. Van Vorst (Democrat) Popularly elected to one, two-year term (4th term)
- 1883 — John Young (Republican) Popularly elected to one, two-year term
- 1885 — Henry S. DeForest (Democrat) Popularly elected to one, two-year term (1st term)
- 1887 — (Thomas) Low Barhydt (Republican) Popularly elected to one, two-year term
- 1889 — Henry S. DeForest (Democrat) Popularly elected to one, two-year term (2nd term)
- 1891 — Everett Smith (Republican) Popularly elected to one, two-year term
- 1893 — Jacob Winne Clute (Republican) Popularly elected to two, two-year terms (1st-2nd terms) (2nd term extended from April to December 31st in 1897)
- 1898 — Charles C. Duryee (Silver Democrat) Popularly elected to one, two-year term commencing 1/1/1898 (1st term)
- 1900 — John H. White (Democrat) Popularly elected to one, two-year term
- 1902 — Horace S. Van Voast (Republican) Popularly elected to one, two-year term
- 1904 — F. F. Eisenmenger (Democrat)
- 1906 — Jacob W. Clute (Republican)
- 1908 — Horace S. VanVoast (Democrat)
- 1910 — Charles C. Duryee (Socialist)
- 1912 — George R. Lunn (Democrat)
- 1914 — J. Teller Schoolcraft (Democrat)
- 1916 — George R. Lunn (Democrat)
- 1918 — Charles A. Simon (Republican)
- 1920 — George R. Lunn (Democrat)
- 1922 — George R. Lunn (Democrat)
- 1923 — C. A. Whitmire (Republican)
- 1924 — William W. Campbell (Republican)
- 1926 — A. T. Blessing (Republican)
- 1928 — Henry C. Fagal (Republican)
- 1932 — J. Ward White (Democrat)
- 1934 — Henry C. Fagal (Republican)
- 1936 — Robert W. Baxter (Republican)
- 1940 — Mills Ten Eyck (Republican)
- 1948 — Owen M. Begley (Democrat)
- 1951 — Owen M. Begley (Democrat)
- 1952 — Archibald Wemple (Republican)
- 1956 — Samuel S. Stratton (Democrat) — Later Congressman
- 1959 — Kenneth S. Sheldon (Republican)
- 1960 — Malcolm E. Ellis (Republican)
- 1964 — Malcolm E. Ellis (Republican)
- 1968 — Malcolm E. Ellis (Republican)
- 1972 — Frank J. Duci (Republican)
- 1976 — Frank J. Duci (Republican)
- 1980 — Frank J. Duci (Republican)
- 1984 — Karen B. Johnson (Democrat)
- 1992 — Frank J. Duci (Republican)
- 1993 — Frank J. Duci (Republican)
- 1996 — Albert P. Jurczynski (Republican)
- 2000 — Albert P. Jurczynski (Republican)
- 2003 — Brian U. Stratton (Democrat)
- 2007 — Brian U. Stratton (Democrat)
- 2011 — Gary R. McCarthy (Democrat)
- 2015 — Gary R. McCarthy (Democrat)
- 2019 — Gary R. McCarthy (Democrat)
- 2023 — Gary R. McCarthy (Democrat)
