= Brown School =

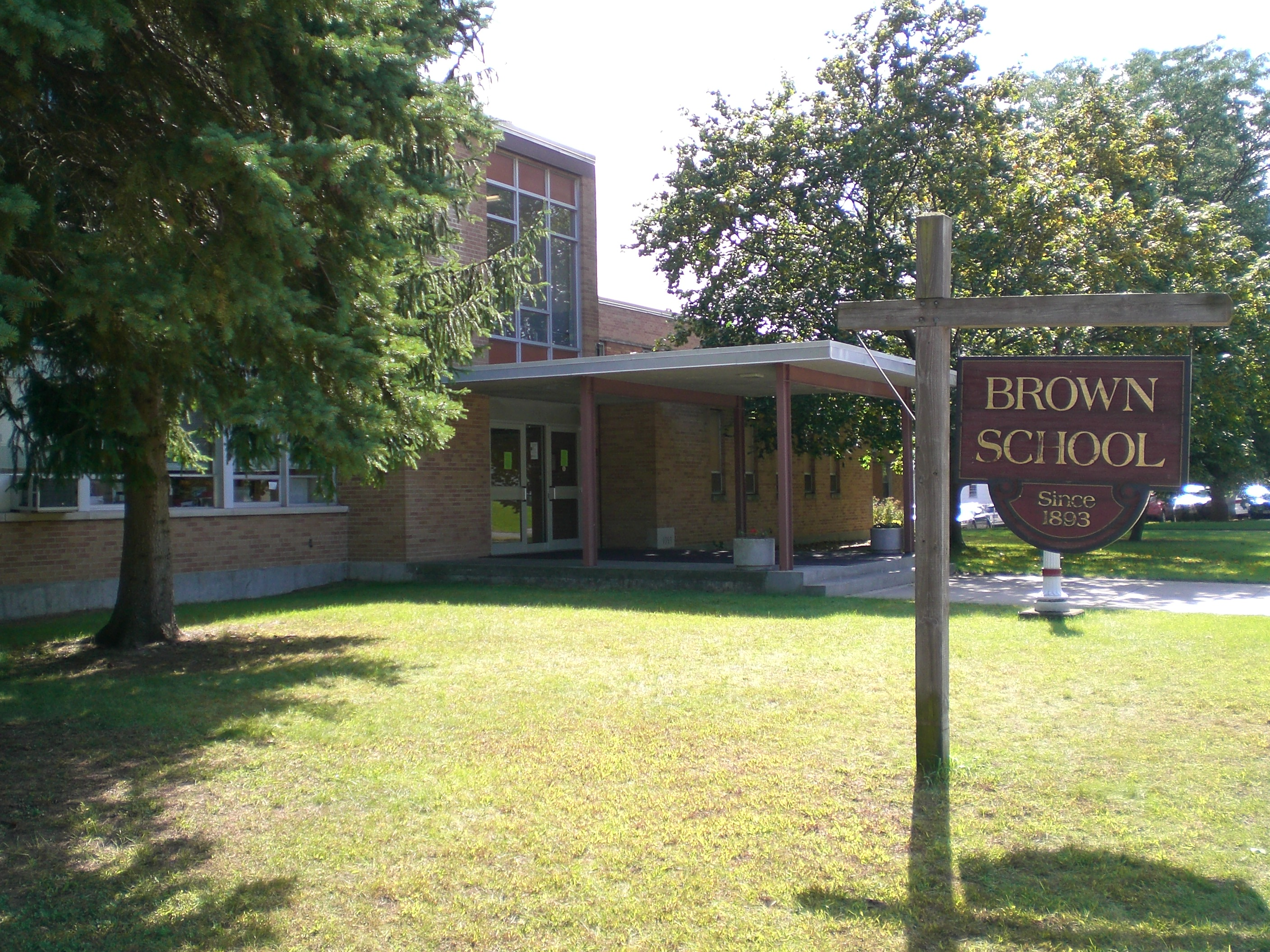

Location
- 150 Corlaer Ave; Schenectady, Schenectady County, New York 12304-1900; United States; 42.783575°N 73.900523°W

Information
- Type: Private school
- Religious affiliation: Nonsectarian
- Established: 1893
- Founder: Helen "Nellie" Brown
- Status: Open
- NCES School ID: 00937905
- Head of school: Patti Vitale
- Faculty: 13.8 (on an FTE basis)
- Grades: PK-12
- Gender: Coeducational
- Enrollment: 146 (2021-2022)
  - Pre-kindergarten: 54
  - Kindergarten: 10
  - Grade 1: 10
  - Grade 2: 10
  - Grade 3: 5
  - Grade 4: 5
  - Grade 5: 8
  - Grade 6: 13
  - Grade 7: 10
  - Grade 8: 9
  - Grade 9: 4
  - Grade 10: 2
  - Grade 11: 2
  - Grade 12: 4
- Student to teacher ratio: 6.7:1
- Hours in school day: 7
- Nickname: Eagles
- Accreditation: New York State Association of Independent Schools
- Newspaper: The Babbler
- Annual tuition: $18,279
- Website: brownschool.org

Brown School is a private school for students in nursery through twelfth grade in Schenectady, New York, United States.

== History ==
In September 1893, Helen "Nellie" Churchill Brown opened the Brown School in the front two rooms of her family home at 237 Liberty Street, with 12 pupils aged 8–11.

During the early 1900s, Brown's school grew quickly. It moved several times, to Park Avenue, 1230 Rugby Road, and eventually, in 1906, to 1184 Rugby Road within the General Electric Realty Plot. A building was constructed on land donated by the Schenectady Realty Company as part of its planned community. Brown School primarily educated children who lived in the G.E. Realty Plot for many years. The area behind the school, an old quarry known affectionately as the "Dump", was the scene of Maypole dances, "Olympic Games", and ski lessons. Each winter, the Dump was flooded and served as a skating pond for the exclusive use of Plot residents. The fire hydrant installed for this purpose is still visible today.

In 1920, Brown retired, the Parents' Association took over the school's operation, and Brown School received its Charter from the Board of Regents. In 1924, the corporation received the title of the school building from the Rice family and others. In 1927, the school's curriculum expanded to include high school students, and the house next door to 1184 Rugby Road was purchased to accommodate the lower school.

By the early 1930s, there were 90 students between the two buildings. Only girls were allowed in the upper grades, known as Miss Brown's Seminary for Young Ladies. Extracurricular activities included drama, glee club, bicycling, horseback riding, and skiing. The girls competed in field hockey and basketball as either the Brown or Orange Team members. The Babbler was the school newspaper. Retrenchment became necessary by 1938, with only seven students in the graduating class. The upper school was eliminated, and the second building was sold.

Brown School's enrollment in 1973 was 40 children. Brown School only went up to second grade by the early 1980s, with an enrollment of 80 students. In 1984, the school expanded by one grade level each year. The elementary school moved to space in the Van Antwerp School on Story Avenue and remained there for seven years. The nursery classes were conducted from the Rugby Road building during that time. Enrollment gradually increased to about 125 students in kindergarten through fifth grade and 65 students in the nursery program.

In 1991, the upper grades (K-5) moved to a facility on Eleanor Street, with the advantage of being the sole tenant and manager of its own space.

The expansion to include Middle School began in 1996. During the 1996-1997 school year, the school's Board of Trustees arranged for the purchase of a 50,000 sq ft (5,000 m^{2}) facility at 150 Corlaer Avenue, which used to be Notre Dame High School and New Life Academy. During that time, the location on Rugby Road was sold. By 1999, Brown School graduated its first eighth-grade class from the 150 Corlaer location.

As of 2013 the school was Schenectady's only independent non-sectarian school. As of the 2017-2018 school year, Brown has its first high school class, including three students. This class started as first-year students, and there have been no graduating high school students yet. As of 2017 Brown School has also completed construction on a new media center.
