= Brian Stratton =

American politician (born 1957)

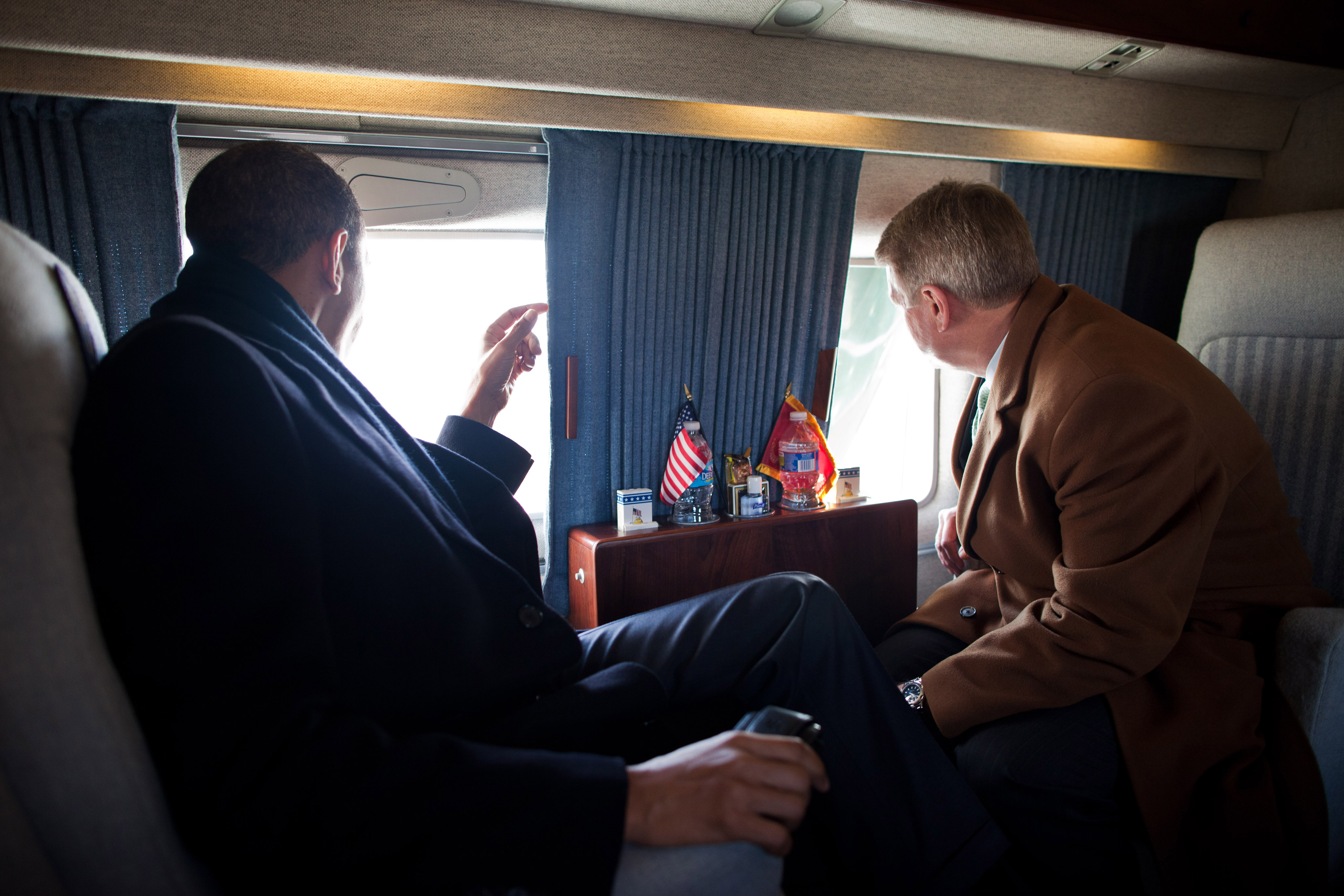
Stratton with President Barack Obama in 2011

Brian U. Stratton (born 6 September 1957) is a former mayor of Schenectady, New York. He is a member of the Democratic Party.

Stratton received his Bachelor of Arts degree from the State University of New York at Oswego in 1980. He began his career in 1981 as an employee of General Electric, where he worked for the company's cable television and broadcasting department in Schenectady before moving to its government relations department in Washington D.C. From 1987 to 2000, Stratton worked for the Empire State Development Corporation as part of its staff in the Office of Science, Technology and Academic Research. He then served on the staff of State Senator Martin Connor.

He served on the Schenectady City Council from 1992 to 2002, and ran unsuccessfully for New York State Senate in 2000. Stratton was the Economic Development and Small Business Liaison for the New York State Senate Minority Leader from 2000 to 2003. From 2002 to 2004 he was a member of the Schenectady County Legislature.

First elected mayor in 2003, elected for a second term in 2007.

Although he was once rumored to be a possible candidate for the Capital District House seat being relinquished by retiring Congressman Michael McNulty, he announced in February 2008 that he was not going to run for this seat. McNulty's predecessor was Stratton's father, Samuel S. Stratton.

Stratton resigned as mayor in 2011 to serve as director of the New York State Canal Corporation, a role he served in until his retirement in 2026. He was replaced by another two-term Upstate mayor, Ben Walsh of Syracuse.

Political offices
Preceded by Albert P. Jurczynski	Mayor of Schenectady; 2004–2011	Succeeded by Gary R. McCarthy; Acting
Preceded by Carmella R. Mantello	Director of NYS Canals; April 2011–January 2026	Incumbent
