= General Electric Realty Plot =

Residential area of Schenectady, New York, USA

- U.S. National Register of Historic Places
- U.S. Historic district
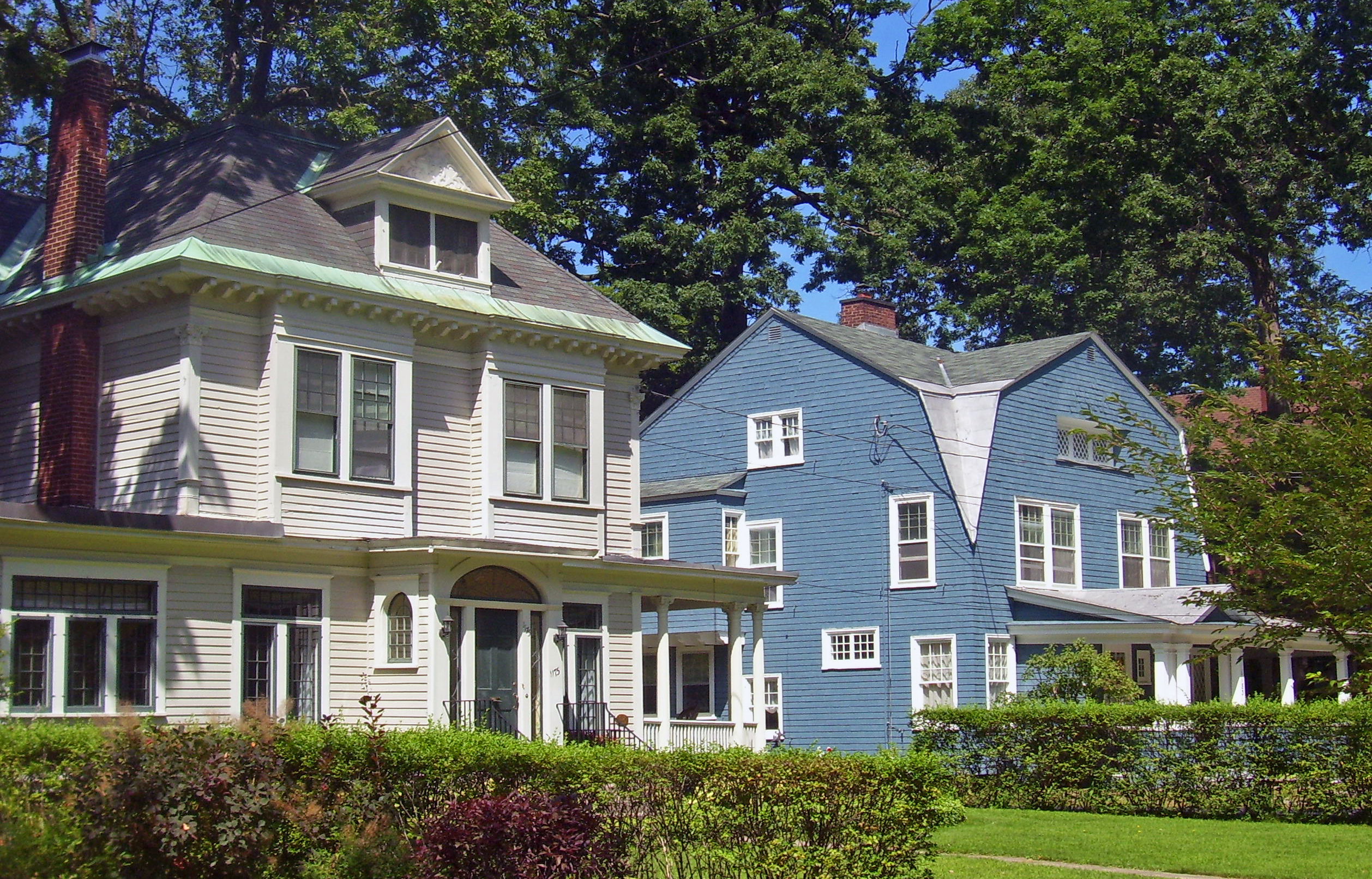
- Houses on Stratford Road, 2008

- Location within New York Location within the United States
- Location: Schenectady, NY
- Coordinates: 42°48′58″N 73°55′12″W
- Area: 90 acres (36 ha)
- Built: 1900–27
- Architectural style: Various early 20th century styles
- NRHP reference No.: 80002763
- Added to NRHP: 1980

The General Electric Realty Plot, often referred to locally as the GE Realty Plot, GE Plots or just The Plot, is a residential neighborhood in Schenectady, New York, United States. It is an area of approximately 90 acres (36 ha) just east of Union College. In 1980 the entire neighborhood was recognized as a historic district and listed on the National Register of Historic Places.

Originally an undeveloped tract owned by the college, it was sold to General Electric (GE) at the end of the 19th century to help the college pay off a debt. The company formed a subsidiary to subdivide and develop it, laid out streets according to a plan inspired by New York's Central Park and built houses on the land, with covenants requiring a minimum lot size and house value. Two of them were among the first fully electric houses in the U.S., used as models by GE.

Alongside top GE executives, local businessmen, and community leaders settling in the neighborhood were scientists who worked either at the company's GE research laboratory or at nearby Union College, which abutted the Plot's western border. The latter were collectively responsible for over 400 patents, with mathematician and electrical engineer Charles Steinmetz alone accounting for 200 patents between his work at GE and as a professor at Union. Some of the key events in their research happened within the Plot, as many took their work home with them.

By 1927 approximately a hundred houses had been built, including the home later occupied by Nobel laureate chemist Irving Langmuir, a GE researcher, during his later life. It has subsequently been designated a National Historic Landmark in recognition of Langmuir's scientific accomplishments, including the Nobel in Chemistry.

The Plot is no longer so heavily dominated by GE employees, due to the company's greatly reduced presence in the city. Houses in it remain highly valued, and residents pay some of the Capital District region's highest property taxes. Rules enforced by both the neighborhood association and the city's Historic Commission preserve its historic character.

== Geography ==
The GE Plot district is mostly bounded by streets, making it roughly quadrilateral in shape. At the west, Lenox Road divides it from the Union College campus. Nott Street forms the northern boundary, separating the Realty Plot from Ellis Hospital until West Alley, the rear property lines between houses on Lowell Road and Glenwood Boulevard, which marks the eastern boundary. After crossing Rugby Road, the line turns west to take in the houses on the south side of that street to its intersection with Wendell Avenue, then following Union Avenue back to Lenox.

A small stream, the Hans Groot Kill, flows west through the district to the Mohawk River, making a ravine 30 feet (9.1 m) deep and 100 feet (30 m) wide through the center of the district. It is spanned by four bluestone arch bridges, all included as contributing properties of the National Register of Historic Places's designation. Many mature trees grow throughout the district.

The houses within are on lots with a minimum size of 70 by 140 feet (21 by 43 m), set back 35–45 feet (11–14 metres) from the streets they front on. They are predominantly in the Colonial Revival or Georgian Revival architectural styles, with some in the Mission Revival, Queen Anne or Shingle Style.

The Steinmetz Memorial on Wendell Avenue is the only significant open space in the district. It is named for Charles Proteus Steinmetz, the German-born electrical engineer whose research made alternating current possible. Steinmetz's house (at 1297 Wendell Avenue) stood on the grounds of the Memorial. He did research in a backyard lab, and both the lab and the house were demolished in 1944. Steinmetz also chaired the city's school board. A separate public park in Schenectady, known as The Steinmetz Park, is located on Lenox Road but is outside the GE Realty Plot district.

The building at 1184 Rugby Road was developed as a primary school and remained in use for that purpose for many years.

Only five buildings have been added to the Plot since its initial period of development in the first quarter of the 20th century. They include a modern church by Edward Durrell Stone from the late 1950s on Wendell Avenue. Most of them are otherwise unintrusive, but are not considered contributing due to their more recent construction.

== History ==
In 1899 Union College announced that it would sell two adjacent tracts of land in order to pay off a $30,000 ($1,161,000 in contemporary dollars) debt. One, the College Woods, was a 75-acre (30 ha) plot located immediately to the east of the college, and the other, the College Meadow, a 30-acre (12 ha) parcel to the west. Prominent citizens of the city called for the Plot to be turned into a park, and a petition to that effect gained 2,200 signatures. The college proposed to lease the land to the city for that purpose, but at a very high annual rate. Shortly afterward, several members of the board of General Electric, which had grown rapidly since Thomas Edison had moved his Edison Machine Works to Schenectady in 1886, announced that the company would buy the land from the college for $57,000 ($2.21 million in contemporary dollars), retiring the college's debt.

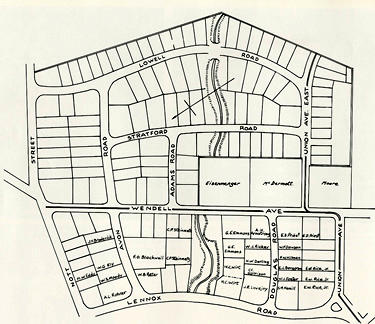
Plat of the original subdivision

GE formed a subsidiary, Schenectady Realty Company, to purchase and develop the land. Their goal was to offer an incentive both for top talent to join GE and retain senior executives and researchers (rather than have them leave for a competitor or start their own companies). It took until 1903 to grade the streets and lay water and sewer lines and build bridges over the Hans Groot Kill, a small stream that bisected the property, and the Union College campus downstream from it.

The plan for the neighborhood was developed by Parse and DeForrest, specialists in the new discipline of urban planning. They took their inspiration from New York City's Central Park, designed by Frederick Law Olmsted and Calvert Vaux. Instead of being planned around a central street, like the way Schenectady had developed along Union Street, thinking which had guided Glenwood and Parkwood boulevards elsewhere in the city, they imagined the area as two smaller lots divided by Wendell Avenue, a street named after a former landowner in the area. They laid out the streets in gentle curves, like the pathways in Central Park. To further maintain a more pastoral setting, they tried something new on residential city streets at the time, using a "sod gutter" in place of a curb on paved streets.

Covenants in the deeds for each lot limited construction on it to one single-family house, to be sold or valued at no less than $4,000 ($155,000 in contemporary dollars), almost twice the median home value in Schenectady at that time, a value later raised to account for inflation. Construction had to commence within two years of the purchase of the lot. The setback and lot size restrictions were also set at this time. Another provision limited the height of any fence between properties to 3 feet 6 inches (107 cm), to ensure they were purely ornamental. When the plans were finished, the property's surveyor claimed "We have here a suburban residential plot second-to-none between New York and Chicago, either in layout, restrictions, or the class of houses upon it."

The streets were mostly named from a combination of the works of Sir Walter Scott and two prominent names in the history of New England, Adams and Lowell. Rugby Road was named due to the use of an adjacent field for rugby matches. Nott Street already existed and had been named for Union College president Eliphalet Nott. Lenox Road was originally spelled with two "n"'s.

Every winter an area behind Brown School was flooded to create a skating pond for residents of the Plot, who received a special lapel tag to identify themselves. The fire hydrant built for this purpose is still extant.

Houses were built and sold rapidly. Some non-GE residents moved in, including the city's then-mayor F.F. Eisenmanger. In 1912 another mayor, George R. Lunn, the first Socialist mayor in New York and later the state's lieutenant governor, had the city take over the maintenance of the streets. This led to the installation of sidewalks, which diluted the original pastoral sod-gutter look.

The original map of the plot shows three large parcels in the Oxford Street area to the east. Not part of the original College Woods property, they were eventually purchased by the realty company in 1914 and developed. These lots lacked the covenants in the earlier ones, and as a result some of the houses on Rugby Road are closer together than the rest of the neighborhood.

By 1927 almost all the lots were bought and built on. Since then only five new buildings have been constructed in the district.

== Preservation ==
The neighborhood is one of four historic districts recognized by the city of Schenectady. It comes under the purview of its Historic Commission, a seven-member body that meets once a month. Under the city's zoning regulations, any change to a historic building in a district that is visible from a public right-of-way must be approved by the commission. Houses in the district, already the largest in the city, have some of the highest property tax valuations in the Capital District region, from $200–400,000. Many residents pay more than $10,000 annually to the city, county, and school district. Heating bills also run into the thousands.

There is also a neighborhood association, the Realty Plot Association. It publishes a newsletter, The Plot Spotter, sponsors a biennial house and garden tour and works to maintain the neighborhood's historic character. Members also greet new residents with a bottle of champagne and An Enclave of Elegance, a history of the neighborhood.

Union College owns several of the houses, and in the late 20th century decided to convert some of them to administrative offices and student housing. Residents objected, citing the deed covenants and zoning that prohibited business uses, and filed suit. In 2001 a state appeals court upheld a lower-court ruling in the college's favor. As a nonprofit the college was not a business, and its presence predated the creation of the Plot and its deed covenants, so the framers of those covenants would have likely included language explicitly restricting college-related activities if that had been their intent. It converted the Parker-Rice estate at 1128 Lenox Road into offices for its fundraising and alumni relations departments. An attempt to have the state's Court of Appeals, its highest, hear the case was denied.

== Significant contributing properties ==
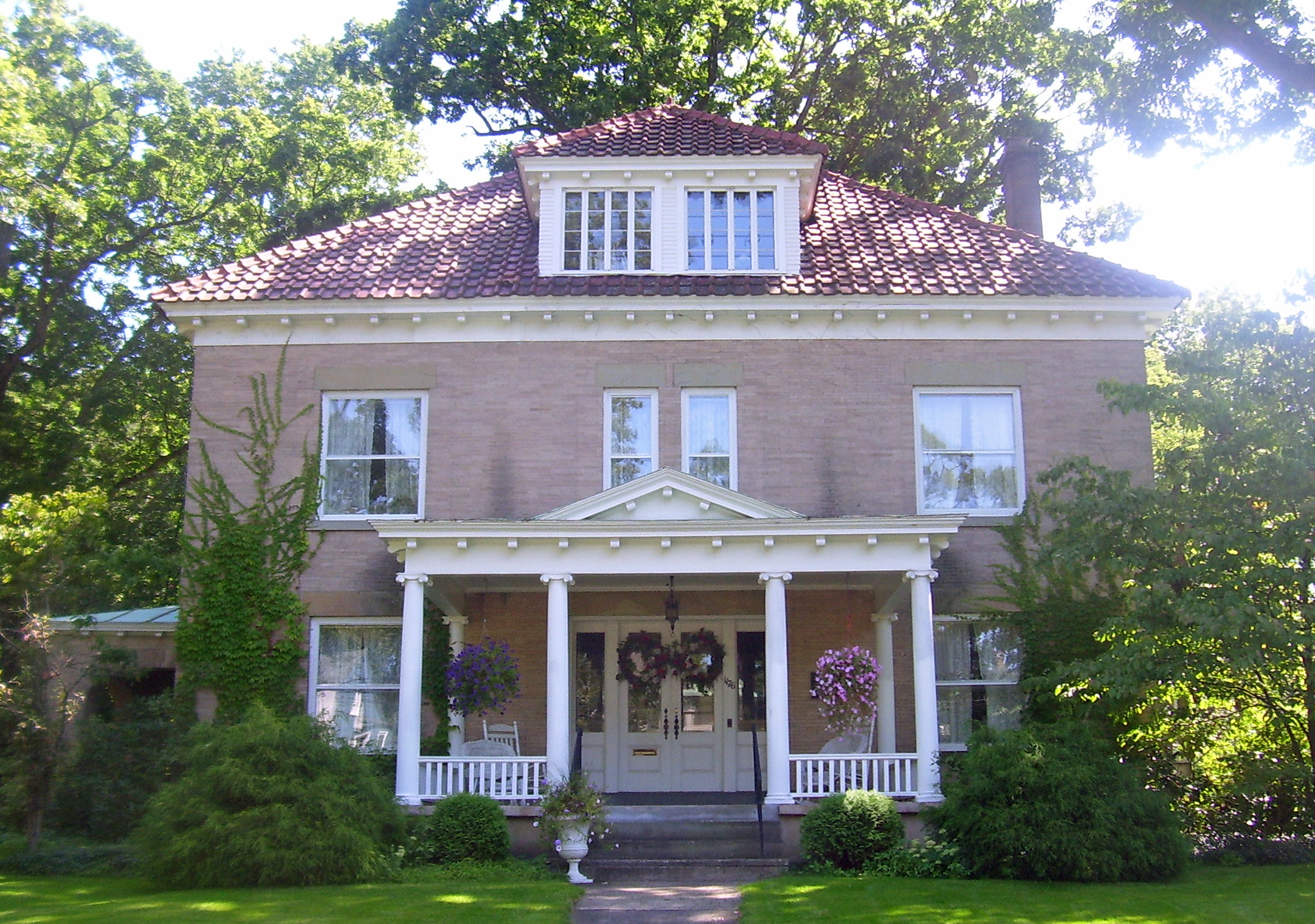
The Irving Langmuir House, home of a GE Nobel laureate

Many homes in the historic district have legacies attached to significant former residents:

- 67 Union Avenue. In 1900, the first home built for Edwin W. Rice, a GE executive and president of Schenectady Realty, considered one of the three fathers of General Electric.
- Edwin Rice House, 1050 Avon Road. Rice built this house for himself in 1905.
- 1155 Avon Road. One of the first all-electric houses in the country when built in 1905.
- 6 Douglas Road. The first all-electric "Gold Medallion" house in the nation in 1901.
- Ernst Alexanderson House, 1132 Adams Road. Alexanderson, a pioneer in radio and television development, held 322 patents. The first television broadcast was received here in 1927. GE used it as a model for such houses
- Ernst Julius Berg House, 1336 Lowell Road. Home of the producer of the first two-way radio program in the U.S.
- William D. Coolidge House, 1480 Lenox Road. Home of the inventor of the modern X-ray tube. He served in his later years as GE's director of research
- Caryl Parker Haskins House, 1166 Avon Road. Home of the entomologist when he taught at Union College.
- Albert Hull House, 1435 Lowell Road. Home of the inventor of the magnetron, the later foundation for the development of radar and microwave ovens. He held 94 patents.
- Irving Langmuir House, 1176 Stratford Road. From 1919 until his death in 1957, this was the home of Irving Langmuir, winner of the 1932 Nobel Prize in Chemistry and the first industrial chemist so honored. Designated a National Historic Landmark in 1985, this is the only contributing property in the district separately listed on the National Register.
- George R. Lunn House, 1299 Stratford Road. Lunn was the first Socialist elected mayor of a city in New York. He later served as lieutenant governor for a term under Alfred E. Smith.
- Chester Rice House, 1161 Lowell Road. Rice, a GE engineer, directed radio beams at nearby vehicles and got them to bounce back; conducted in the 1930s, the experiment was one of the earliest practical demonstrations of radar.

== See also ==
- National Register of Historic Places listings in Schenectady County, New York
