= Irving Langmuir House =

Historic house in New York, United States

- U.S. National Register of Historic Places
- U.S. National Historic Landmark
- U.S. Historic district – Contributing property
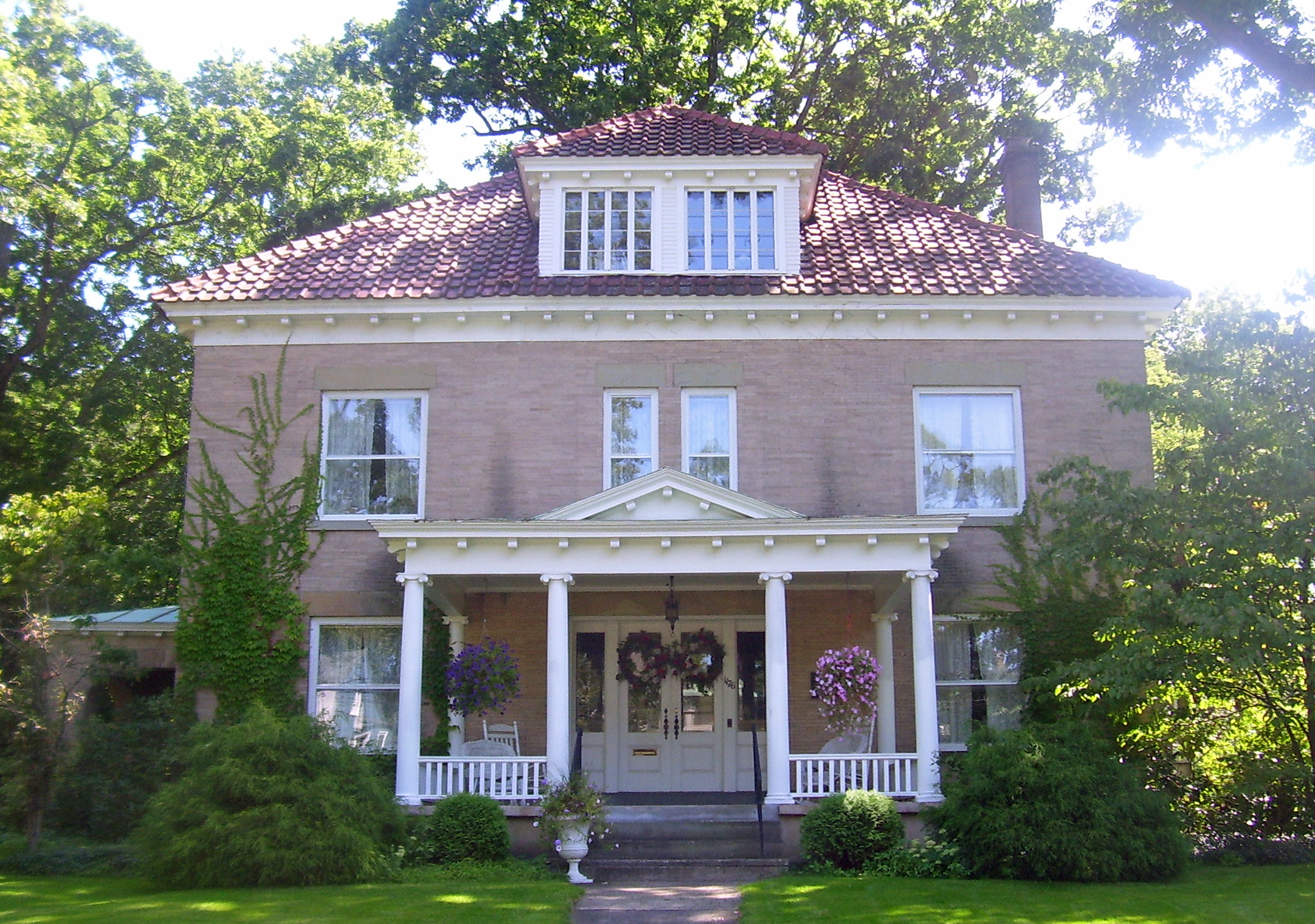
- Front elevation, 2008

- Location within New York Location within the United States
- Interactive map showing the Langmuir House location
- Location: 1176 Stratford Road, Schenectady, New York
- Coordinates: 42.8152°N 73.9196°W
- Area: less than one acre
- Built: ca. 1900
- Architectural style: Colonial Revival
- Part of: General Electric Realty Plot (ID80002763)
- NRHP reference No.: 76001275

Significant dates
- Added to NRHP: January 7, 1976
- Designated NHL: January 7, 1976
- Designated CP: November 18, 1980

The Irving Langmuir House is a historic house at 1176 Stratford Road in Schenectady, New York. Built about 1900, it was the home of physicist-chemist Irving Langmuir, winner of the 1932 Nobel Prize in Chemistry during his research career with General Electric. It was declared a National Historic Landmark in 1976.

== Description and history ==
The Irving Langmuir House is located in the middle of a suburban area east of Union College known as the General Electric Realty Plot, a historic district to which it is a contributing property. The neighborhood is residential, with large houses dating to the late 19th and early 20th centuries. It is located on the east side of Stratford Road, a short way north of Rugby Road. Architecturally, the house is unremarkable. It is a two-and-a-half-story building in a vernacular interpretation of the Colonial Revival style. The hipped roof is tiled in terra cotta and pierced by two almost symmetrical dormer windows. A columned porch covers the Palladian-style main entrance. The interior follows a basic central-hall plan.

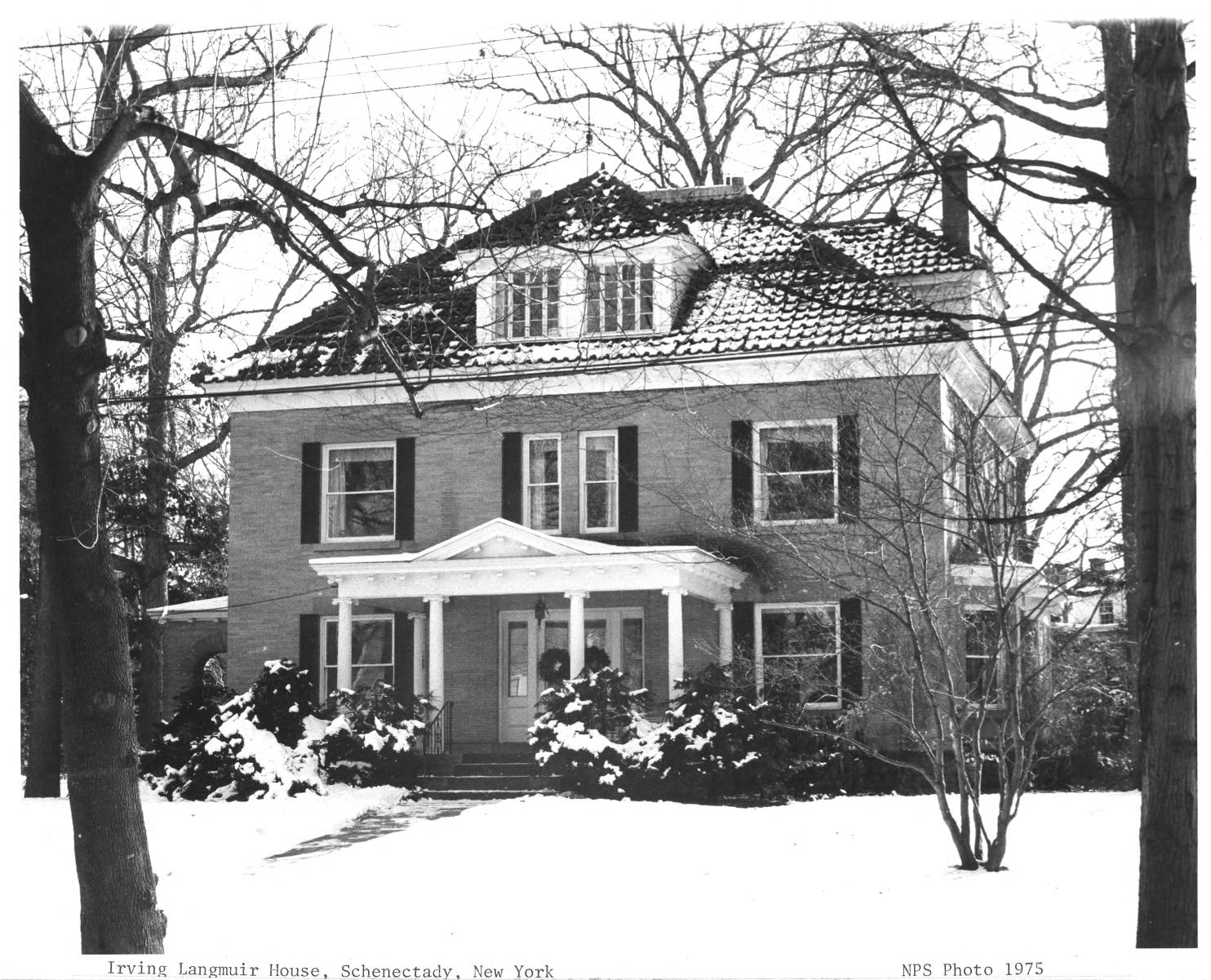
1975 view of house

The house was probably built ca. 1900. In 1919 Langmuir moved in, living there until his death in 1957. It was still in his family's hands at the time of its landmark designation almost two decades later. Langmuir worked at GE's Schenectady research laboratory in 1909, where he performed basic research in a wide array of areas of physics and chemistry. He retired in 1950, having won numerous awards, most prominently the 1932 Nobel Prize in Chemistry for his work in surface chemistry.

== See also ==
- List of National Historic Landmarks in New York
- National Register of Historic Places listings in Schenectady County, New York
