= Schenectady, New York =

City in New York, United States

Schenectady
- City
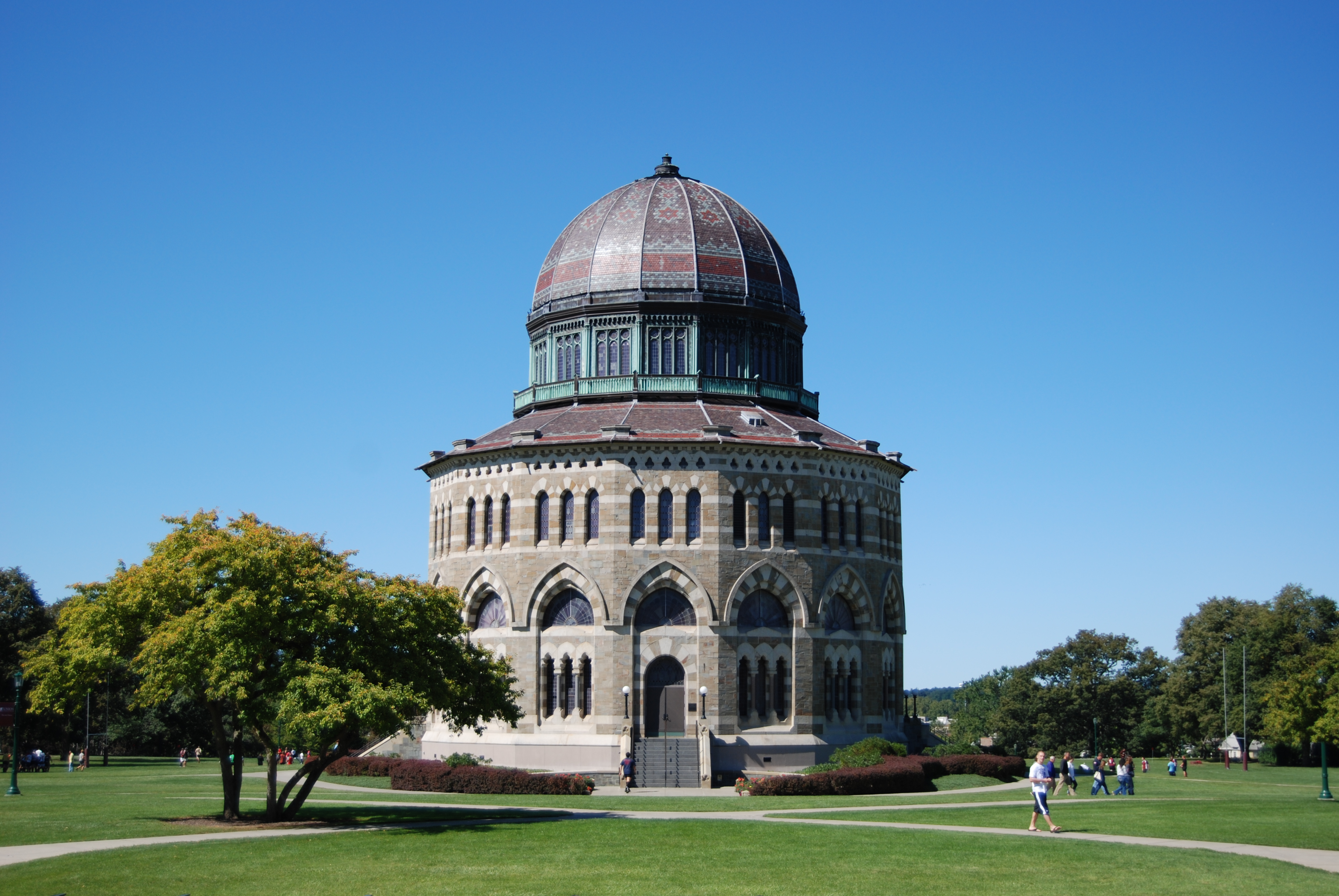
- Nott Memorial Hall at Union College

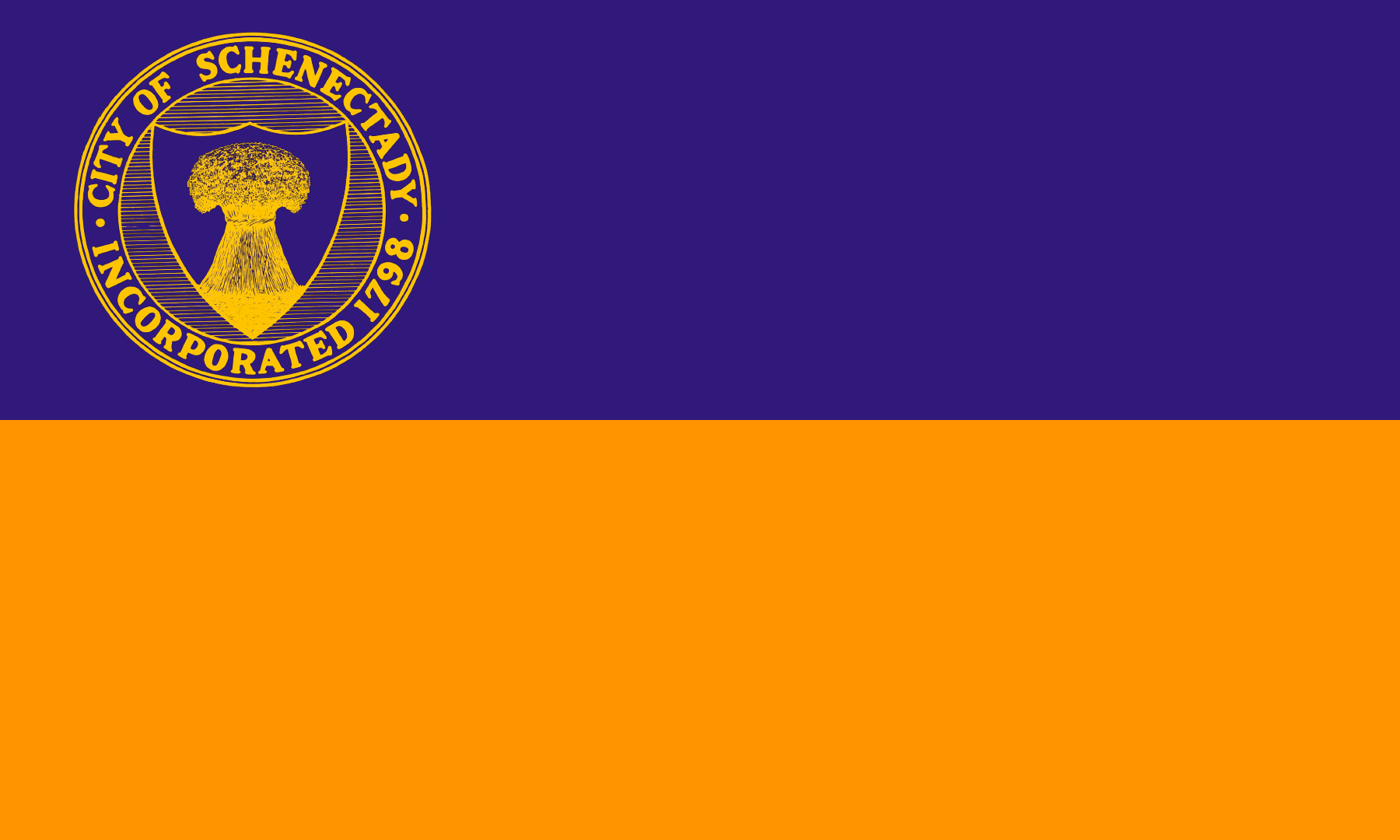
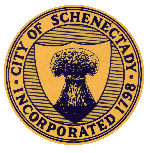
- Flag Seal
- Nickname: The Electric City
- Motto: "The city that lights and hauls the world."

- Location in New York (state) Location within the United States
- Coordinates: 42°48′51″N 73°56′14″W
- Country: United States
- State: New York
- County: Schenectady
- Region: Capital District
- Settled: 1661
- Incorporated: 1798

Government
  - Mayor: Gary R. McCarthy (D)

Area
  - City: 10.98 sq mi (28.43 km^{2})
  - Land: 10.81 sq mi (27.99 km^{2})
  - Water: 0.17 sq mi (0.44 km^{2})

Population (2020)
  - City: 67,047
  - Density: 6,203.6/sq mi (2,395.24/km^{2})
  - Metro: 1,170,483
- Time zone: UTC−5 (Eastern (EST))
  - Summer (DST): UTC−4 (EDT)
- ZIP Codes: 12301–12309, 12325, 12345
- Area code: 518
- FIPS code: 36-65508
- GNIS feature ID: 0964570
- Website: cityofschenectady.gov

Schenectady (/skəˈnɛktədi/ skə-NEKT-ə-dee) (Note: "Schenectady". Oxford Dictionaries UK English Dictionary. Oxford University Press.) is a city in Schenectady County, New York, United States, of which it is the county seat. As of the 2020 census, the city's population of 67,047 made it the state's ninth-most populous city and the 25th-most populous municipality. The city is in eastern New York, near the confluence of the Mohawk and Hudson Rivers. It is in the same metropolitan area as the state capital, Albany, which is about 15 mi (24 km) southeast.

Schenectady was founded on the south side of the Mohawk River by Dutch colonists in the 17th century, many of whom came from the Albany area. The name "Schenectady" is derived from the Mohawk word skahnéhtati, meaning "beyond the pines" and used for the area around Albany, New York. Residents of the new village developed farms on strip plots along the river.

Union College, the first private nondenominational institution of higher education in the United States, and the second college established in the State of New York, was chartered in Schenectady in 1795.

Connected to the west by the Mohawk River and Erie Canal, Schenectady developed rapidly in the 19th century as part of the Mohawk Valley trade, manufacturing, and transportation corridor. By 1824, more people worked in manufacturing than agriculture or trade; like many New York cities, it had a cotton mill that processed cotton from the Deep South. In the 19th century, nationally influential companies and industries developed in Schenectady, including General Electric (GE) and American Locomotive Company, which were powers into the mid-20th century. Schenectady was part of emerging technologies, with GE collaborating in the production of nuclear-powered submarines and, in the 21st century, working on other forms of renewable energy.

== History ==
When first encountered by Europeans, the Mohawk Valley was the territory of the Mohawk nation, one of the Five Nations of the Haudenosaunee Confederacy or Iroquois. They had occupied territory in the region since at least 1100 AD. Starting in the early 1600s, the Mohawks moved their settlements closer to the river; by 1629, they had also taken over territories on the Hudson River's west bank that were formerly held by the Algonquian-speaking Mahican people.

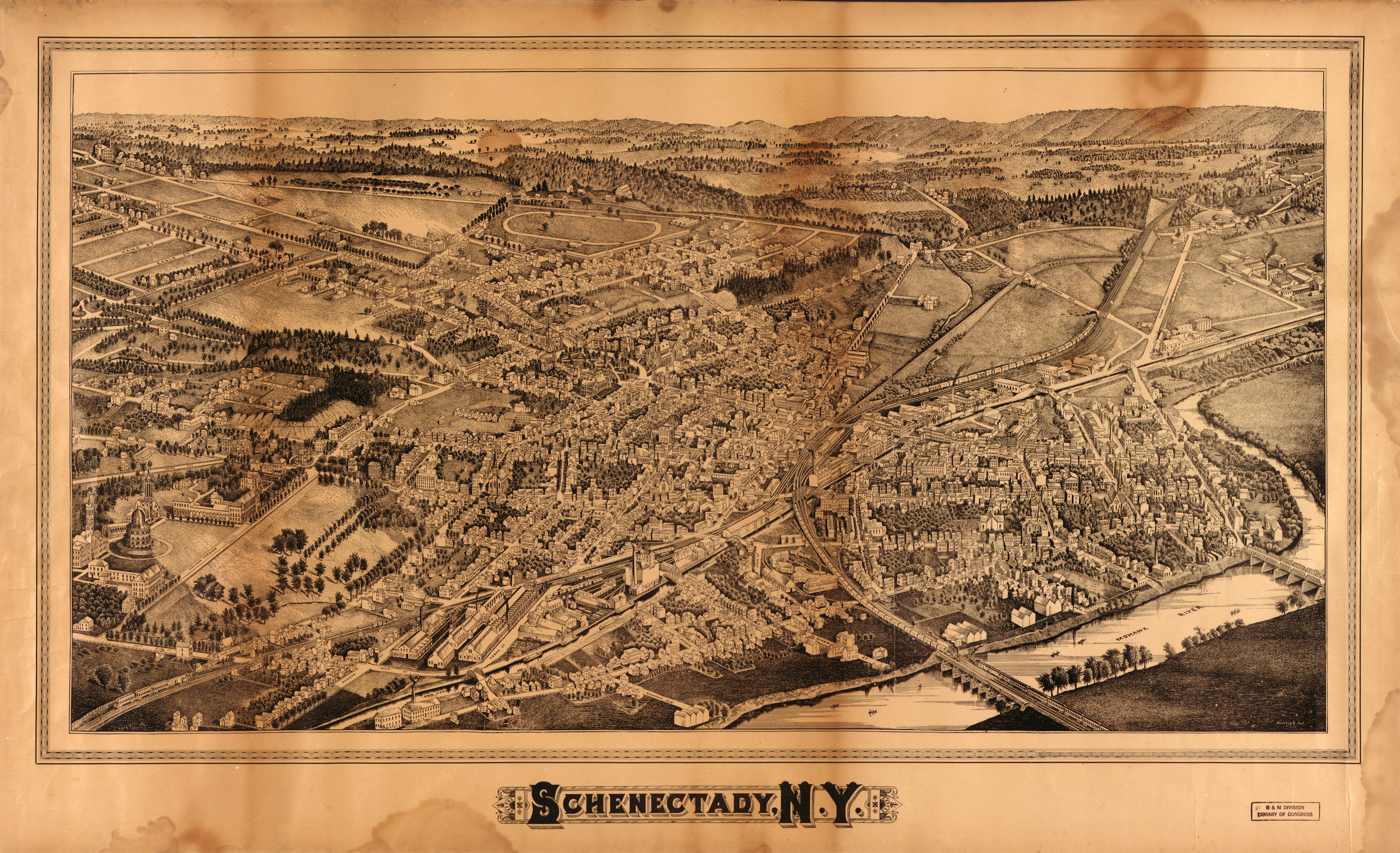
Perspective map of Schenectady from 1882

In the 1640s, the Mohawk had three major villages, all on the Mohawk River's south side. The easternmost one was Ossernenon, about 9 miles west of present-day Auriesville, New York. When Dutch settlers developed Fort Orange (present-day Albany, New York) in the Hudson Valley beginning in 1614, the Mohawk called their settlement skahnéhtati, also transliterated to Sche-negh-ta-da, meaning "beyond the pines", referring to a large area of pine barrens between the Mohawk settlements and the Hudson River. About 3,200 acres of this unique ecosystem are now protected as the Albany Pine Bush. Eventually, the word entered the lexicon of the Dutch settlers. The settlers in Fort Orange used skahnéhtati to refer to the new village at the Mohawk flats (see below), which became known as Schenectady (with a variety of spellings).

In 1661, Arendt van Corlaer (later Van Curler), a Dutch immigrant, bought a large piece of land on the Mohawk River's south side. The colonial government gave other colonists grants of land in this portion of the flat, fertile river valley, as part of New Netherland. The settlers recognized the Mohawk had cultivated these bottomlands for maize for centuries. Van Curler took the largest piece of land; the remainder was divided into 50 acres (0.20 km^{2}) plots for the other first 14 proprietors, Alexander Lindsey Glen, Philip Hendrickse Brouwer, Simon Volkertse Veeder, Pieter Adrianne Van Wogglelum, Teunize Cornelise Swart, Bastia De Winter atty for Catalyn De Vos, Gerrit Bancker, William Teller, Pieter Jacobse Borsboom, Pieter Danielle Van Olinda, Jan Barentse Wemp(le), Jacques Cornelize Van Slyck, Marten Cornelize Van Esselstyn, and Harmen Albertse Vedder. As most early colonists were from the Fort Orange area, they may have anticipated working as fur traders, but the Beverwijck (later Albany) traders kept a monopoly of legal control. The settlers here turned to farming. Their 50-acre lots were unique for the colony and were "laid out in strips along the Mohawk River," with the narrow edges fronting the river, as in French colonial style. They relied on rearing livestock and wheat. The proprietors and their descendants controlled all the land of the town for generations, essentially acting as government until after the Revolutionary War, when representative government was established.

Beginning from the first decades of European colonization, Dutch colonists formed relationships with Mohawk women, though they did not usually result in marriage. Their children were raised within Mohawk communities, as the tribe had a matrilineal kinship system, and these multiracial offspring were considered to be born into the mother's clan. During the colonial era, the fur trade formed one of the important trading relationships between Indigenous groups and colonists. In response to labor shortages among Dutch colonists, enslaved Africans were imported to work on farmsteads in Schenectady.

Some Euro-Indian descendants, such as Jacques Cornelissen Van Slyck and his sister Hilletie van Olinda, who were of Dutch, French, and Mohawk ancestry, became interpreters and intermarried with Dutch colonists. They also gained land in the Schenectady settlement. They were among the few métis who seemed to move from Mohawk to Dutch society, as they were described as "former Indians", although they did not always have an easy time of it. In 1661, Jacques inherited what became known as Van Slyck's Island from his brother Marten, who had been given it by the Mohawk. Van Slyck family descendants retained ownership through the 19th century.

In 1664, an English fleet conquered the colony of New Netherland and renamed it New York. They confirmed the monopoly on the fur trade by Albany, and issued orders to prohibit Schenectady from the trade through 1670 and later. Settlers purchased additional land from the Mohawk in 1670 and 1672. (Jacques and Hilletie Van Slyck each received portions of land in the Mohawk 1672 deed for Schenectady.) Twenty years later (1684) Governor Thomas Dongan granted letters patent for Schenectady to five additional trustees.

On February 8, 1690, during King William's War, French forces and their Indian allies, mostly Ojibwe and Algonquin warriors, attacked Schenectady by surprise, leaving 62 dead, 11 of them enslaved Africans. American history notes it as the Schenectady massacre. In total, 27 persons were taken captive, including five enslaved Africans; the raiders took their captives overland about 200 mi (300 km) to Montreal and its associated Mohawk mission village of Kahnawake. Typically, the younger captives were adopted by Mohawk families to replace people who had died. Through the early 18th century in the raiding between Quebec and the northern British colonies, some captives were ransomed by their communities. Colonial governments got involved only for high-ranking officers or other officials. In 1748, during King George's War, the French and Indigenous attacked Schenectady again, killing 70 residents.

In 1765, Schenectady was incorporated as a borough. During the American Revolutionary War, the local militia unit, the 2nd Albany County Militia Regiment, fought in the Battle of Saratoga and against Loyalist troops. Most of the wars in the Mohawk Valley were fought further west on the frontier in the areas of the German Palatine settlement, which was west of Little Falls. Because of their close business and other relationships with the British, some settlers from the city were Loyalists and moved to Canada in the late stages of the revolution. The British crown granted them land in what became known as Upper Canada and later Ontario.

=== After the revolution ===
After the Revolutionary War, the village residents reduced the power of the descendants of the early trustees and gained representative government, one in which citizens elected politicians who enacted laws, as opposed to the citizens voting on the laws directly. Long interested in supporting higher education and morals, the members of the city's three oldest churches—the Dutch First Reformed Church, St. George's Episcopal Church, and First Presbyterian Church—formed a "union" and founded Union College in 1795 under a charter from the state. The school had started in 1785 as Schenectady Academy. This founding was part of the expansion of higher education in upstate New York in the postwar years.

Schenectady was chartered as a city in 1798. In 1819, Schenectady suffered a fire that destroyed more than 170 buildings and most of its historic, distinctively Dutch-style architecture. The Erie Canal was dug along the Mohawk River in the 1820s. During this period, migrants poured into upstate and western New York from New England, but new immigrants also arrived from England and Europe. Many traveled west along the Mohawk, settling in the western part of the state, where they developed more agriculture on former Iroquois lands. A dairy industry developed in the central part of the state. New settlers were predominantly of English and Scotch-Irish descent.

New York had passed a law for gradual abolition of slavery in 1799, but in 1824, 102 enslaved individuals were still in Schenectady County, with nearly half residing in the city. That year, the city of Schenectady had a total population of 3939, which included 240 free Blacks, 47 enslaved, and 91 foreigners.

In the 19th century, after completion of the Erie Canal in 1825, Schenectady became an important transportation, manufacturing, and trade center. By 1824, more of its population worked in manufacturing than agriculture or trade. Among the industries was a cotton mill, which processed cotton from the Deep South. It was one of many such mills in upstate New York whose products were part of the exports shipped out of New York City. The city and state had many economic ties to the South at the same time that some residents became active in the abolitionist movement.

Schenectady benefited by increased traffic connecting the Hudson River to the Mohawk Valley and the Great Lakes to the west and New York City to the south. The Albany and Schenectady Turnpike (now State Street) was constructed in 1797 to connect Albany to settlements in the Mohawk Valley. The Mohawk and Hudson Railroad started operations in 1831 as one of the first railway lines in the United States, connecting the city and Albany by a route through the pine barrens between them. Developers in Schenectady quickly founded the Utica and Schenectady Railroad, chartered in 1833; Schenectady and Susquehanna Railroad, chartered May 5, 1836; and Schenectady and Troy Railroad, chartered in 1836, making Schenectady "the rail hub of America at the time" and competing with the Erie Canal. Commodities from the Great Lakes areas and commercial products were shipped to the East and New York City through the Mohawk Valley and Schenectady.

The last enslaved individuals in Schenectady gained freedom in 1827, under the state's gradual abolition law. The law first gave freedom to children born to enslaved mothers, but they were indentured to the mother's master for a period into their early 20s. Union College established a school for Black children in 1805, but discontinued it two years later. Methodists helped educate the children for a time, but public schools did not accept them.

In the 1830s, the abolitionist movement grew in Schenectady. In 1836, Rev. Isaac Groot Duryee (also recorded as Duryea) co-founded the interracial Anti-Slavery Society at Union College and the Anti-Slavery Society of Schenectady in 1837. Freedom seekers were supported via the Underground Railroad route that ran through the area, passing to the west and north to Canada, which had abolished slavery.

In 1837, Duryee, together with others who were free people of color, co-founded the First Free Church of Schenectady (now the Duryee Memorial AME Zion Church). He also started a school for students of color. Abolitionist Theodore S. Wright, an African-American minister based in New York City, spoke at the church's dedication and praised the school.

Through the late 19th century, new industries were established in the Mohawk Valley and powered by the river. Industrial jobs attracted many new immigrants, first from Ireland, and later in the century from Italy and Poland. In 1887, Thomas Edison moved his Edison Machine Works to Schenectady. In 1892, Schenectady became the headquarters of General Electric. This business became a major industrial and economic force and helped establish the city and region as a national manufacturing center. GE became important nationally as a creative company, expanding into many different fields. American Locomotive Company also developed here, from a Schenectady company, and merging several smaller companies in 1901; it was second in the United States in the manufacture of steam locomotives before developing diesel technology.

=== 20th century to present ===
Like other industrial cities in the Mohawk Valley, in the early 20th century, Schenectady attracted many new immigrants from both Eastern Europe and Southern Europe, as they could fill many of the new industrial jobs. It also attracted African Americans as part of the Great Migration out of the rural Southern United States to northern cities for work. General Electric and American Locomotive Company (ALCO) were industrial powerhouses, influencing innovation in a variety of fields across the country.

Schenectady is home to WGY, the second commercial radio station in the US, (after WBZ in Springfield, Massachusetts, named for Westinghouse Broadcasting). WGY was named for its owner, General Electric (the G), and the city of Schenectady (the Y). In 1928, General Electric produced the first regular television broadcasts in the United States, when the experimental station W2XB began regular broadcasts on Thursday and Friday afternoons. This television station is now WRGB; for many years, it was the Capital District's NBC affiliate. It has been the area's CBS affiliate since 1981.

The city reached its peak of population in 1930, around 95,000. The Great Depression caused a loss of jobs and population in its wake. In the period after World War II, some residents moved to newer housing in suburban locations outside the city. In addition, GE established some high-tech facilities in the neighboring town of Niskayuna, which contributed to continuing population growth in the county. In the latter part of the 20th century, Schenectady suffered from the massive industrial and corporate restructuring that affected much of the US, including in the railroads. It lost many jobs and population to other locations, including offshore. Since the late 20th century, it has been shaping a new economy, based in part on renewable energy. Its population increased from 2000 to 2010, from over 61,000 to over 66,000—albeit still some 15,000 below its 1960 level.

== Geography ==
According to the United States Census Bureau, the city has a total area of 11.0 square miles (28.49 km^{2}), of which 0.1 sq mi (0.26 km^{2}) (1.27%) is covered by water.

It is part of the Capital District, the metropolitan area surrounding Albany, the New York's state capital. Along with Albany and Troy, it is one of the three principal population and industrial centers in the region.

Interstate 890 runs through Schenectady, and the New York State Thruway (Interstate 90) is nearby. Amtrak has a station in Schenectady. The nearest airport is Schenectady County Airport; the nearest commercial airport is Albany International Airport.

ZIP code 12345, which is used by the GE plant in Schenectady, has attracted media attention on account of its simplicity. Thousands of letters and Christmas lists addressed to Santa Claus are mailed to the ZIP code every year.

Schenectady has a humid continental climate that is hot-summer (Dfa) bordering upon warm-summer (Dfb.) Average monthly temperatures range from 22.9 °F (−5.1 °C) in January to 71.8 °F (22.1 °C) in July. These are estimates made by local amateur observers and are not official, as Schenectady does not have a weather station of its own (its "official" temperatures come from nearby Albany).

== Economy ==
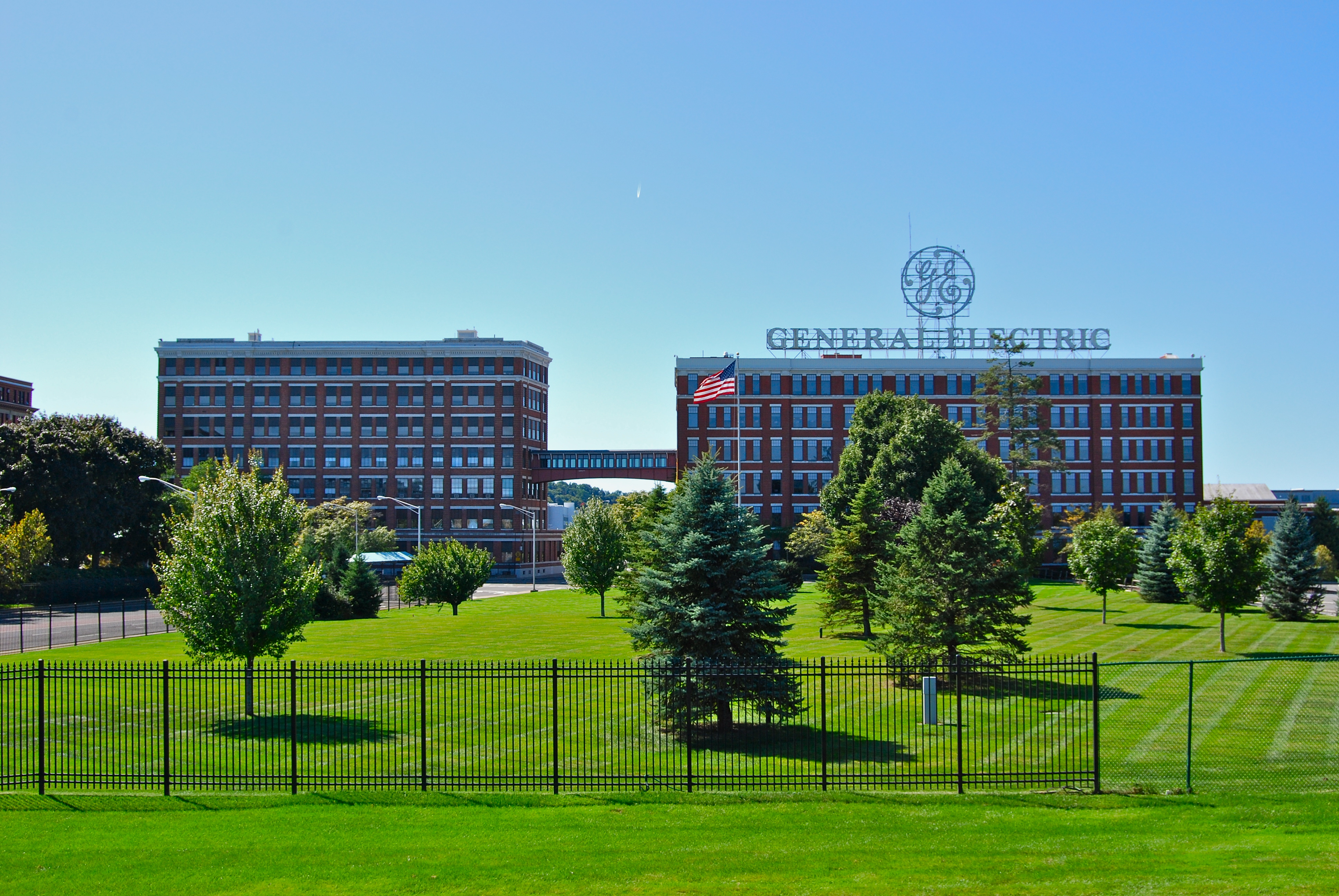
GE building, formerly corporate headquarters

Schenectady was a manufacturing center known as "the City that Lights and Hauls the World"—a reference to two prominent businesses in the city, the Edison Electric Company (now known as General Electric), and the American Locomotive Company (ALCO).

GE retains its steam-turbine manufacturing facilities in Schenectady and its global research facility in nearby Niskayuna. Thousands of manufacturing jobs have been relocated from Schenectady to the Sun Belt and abroad. Corporate headquarters for GE Vernova are now in Cambridge, Massachusetts.

ALCO produced steam locomotives for railroads for years. Later, it became renowned for its "Superpower" line of high-pressure locomotives, such as those for the Union Pacific Railroad in the 1930s and 1940s. During World War II, it converted to support the war, making tanks for the US Army. As diesel locomotives began to be manufactured, ALCO joined with GE to develop diesel locomotives to compete with GM's EMD division, but corporate restructuring to cope with the changing locomotive procurement environment led to ALCO's slow downward spiral. Its operations fizzled as it went through acquisitions and restructuring in the late 1960s. Its Schenectady plant closed in 1969.

In the late 20th century, due to industrial restructuring, the city lost many jobs and suffered difficult financial times, as did many former manufacturing cities in upstate New York. The loss of employment caused Schenectady's population to decline by nearly one-third from 1950 into the late 20th century. The early industries had left many sites contaminated with hazardous wastes. Such environmental brownfields have needed technical approaches for redevelopment.

In the 21st century, Schenectady began revitalization. GE established a renewable energy center that brought hundreds of employees to the area. The city is part of a metropolitan area with improving economic health, and a number of buildings have been renovated for new uses. Numerous small businesses, retail stores, and restaurants have developed on State Street downtown.

Price Chopper Supermarkets and the New York Lottery are based in Schenectady.

In December 2014, the state announced that the city was one of three sites selected for development of off-reservation casino gambling, under terms of a 2013 state constitutional amendment. The project would redevelop an ALCO brownfield site in the city along the waterfront, with hotels, housing, and a marina in addition to the casino.

In February 2017, the Rivers Casino and Resort opened with 66 table games and 1,150 slot machines on a 50,000-square-foot gambling floor with a steakhouse and a restaurant lounge. The $480 million (~$619 million in 2025) residential-retail project on 60 acres includes a marina, two hotels, condominiums, apartments, and retail and office space for technology firms.

== Demographics ==
Historical population
Census	Pop.	Note	%±
1790	4,228		—
1800	5,289		25.1%
1810	5,903		11.6%
1820	3,939		−33.3%
1830	4,268		8.4%
1840	6,784		59.0%
1850	8,921		31.5%
1860	9,579		7.4%
1870	11,026		15.1%
1880	13,655		23.8%
1890	19,902		45.7%
1900	31,682		59.2%
1910	72,826		129.9%
1920	88,723		21.8%
1930	95,692		7.9%
1940	87,549		−8.5%
1950	91,785		4.8%
1960	81,070		−11.7%
1970	77,958		−3.8%
1980	67,972		−12.8%
1990	65,566		−3.5%
2000	61,821		−5.7%
2010	66,135		7.0%
2020	67,047		1.4%
US Decennial Census

=== Racial and ethnic composition ===
Schenectady city, New York – racial and ethnic composition Note: the US census treats Hispanic/Latino as an ethnic category. This table excludes Latinos from the racial categories and assigns them to a separate category. Hispanics/Latinos may be of any race.
Race / ethnicity (NH = Non-Hispanic)	2020	2010	2000	1990	1980
White alone (NH)	43.5% (29,147)	57.5% (38,006)	74.5% (46,069)	87.4% (57,278)	92% (62,503)
Black alone (NH)	20.2% (13,541)	18.5% (12,258)	14% (8,651)	8.4% (5,502)	5.9% (3,982)
American Indian alone (NH)	1.2% (805)	0.5% (343)	0.3% (204)	0.3% (176)	0.4% (244)
Asian alone (NH)	6.5% (4,352)	3.6% (2,360)	2% (1,222)	1% (666)	0.4% (288)
Pacific Islander alone (NH)	0.1% (93)	0.1% (68)	0% (20)		
Other race alone (NH)	6% (3,999)	3.8% (2,512)	0.3% (210)	0.3% (183)	0.1% (79)
Multiracial (NH)	9.5% (6,352)	5.5% (3,666)	2.9% (1,813)	—	—
Hispanic/Latino (any race)	13.1% (8,758)	10.5% (6,922)	5.9% (3,632)	2.7% (1,761)	1.3% (876)

=== 2020 census ===
As of the 2020 census, Schenectady had a population of 67,047. The median age was 35.1 years. 22.5% of residents were under the age of 18 and 13.8% of residents were 65 years of age or older. For every 100 females there were 93.6 males, and for every 100 females age 18 and over there were 90.0 males age 18 and over.

100.0% of residents lived in urban areas, while 0.0% lived in rural areas.

There were 27,187 households in Schenectady, of which 28.4% had children under the age of 18 living in them. Of all households, 28.0% were married-couple households, 24.6% were households with a male householder and no spouse or partner present, and 37.2% were households with a female householder and no spouse or partner present. About 37.6% of all households were made up of individuals and 12.0% had someone living alone who was 65 years of age or older.

There were 30,634 housing units, of which 11.3% were vacant. The homeowner vacancy rate was 2.2% and the rental vacancy rate was 7.6%.

Racial composition as of the 2020 census
Race	Number	Percent
White	30,803	45.9%
Black or African American	14,722	22.0%
American Indian and Alaska Native	946	1.4%
Asian	4,411	6.6%
Native Hawaiian and Other Pacific Islander	103	0.2%
Some other race	7,149	10.7%
Two or more races	8,913	13.3%
Hispanic or Latino (of any race)	8,758	13.1%

The most reported ancestries in the 2020 census were:

- African American (13.8%)
- Irish (10.8%)
- Italian (9.9%)
- Puerto Rican (8.2%)
- German (7.8%)
- Guyanese (7.7%)
- English (7.3%)
- Indian (4.7%)
- Polish (3.2%)
- French (3.1%)

=== 2010 census ===
In the census of 2010, 66,135 people, 26,265 (2000 data) households, and 14,051 (2000 data) families were residing in the city. The population density was 6,096.7 inhabitants per square mile (2,353.9/km^{2}). The racial makeup of the city was 59.38% (52.31% non-Hispanic - NH) White, 24.19% African American, 14.47% Hispanic or Latino of any race, 8.24% from other races, 5.74% from two or more races, 2.62% Asian American, 0.69% Native American, and 0.14% Pacific Islander. The Guyanese population in the area is growing. The top ancestries self-identified by people on the census are Italian (13.6%), Guyanese (12.3%), Irish (12.1%), Puerto Rican (10.1%), German (8.7%), English (6.0%), Polish (5.4%), and French (4.4%). These reflect historic and early 20th-century immigration, as well as that since the late 20th century.

Of the 28,264 households in 2010, 31.2% had children under 18 living with them, 28.0% were married couples living together, 24.7% had a female householder with no husband present, and 45.5% were not families. About 38.6% of all households were made up of individuals, and 10.8% had someone living alone who was 65 or older. The average household size was 2.23 and the average family size was 2.98. In the city, the age distribution was 26.3% under 18, 13.6% from 18 to 24, 30.7% from 25 to 44, 21.1% from 45 to 64, and 7.2% who were 65 or older. The median age was 32. For every 100 females, there were 92.5 males. For every 100 females 18 and over, there were 88.4 males.

=== 2000 census ===
The median income for a household in the city in 2000 was $29,378 (2010–$37,436), and the median income for a family was $41,158. Males had a median income of $32,929 versus $26,856 for females. The per capita income for the city was $17,076. About 20.2% of families and 25.9% of the population were below the poverty line, including 41.5% of those under age 18 and 5.6% of those age 65 or over. The 30,272 (2000 data) housing units at an average density of 2,790.6 units per square mile (1,077.5 units/km^{2}).

=== Education ===
The Schenectady City School District is very diverse; (71%- 2011)(80%–2013) of district students receive free or reduced lunch. The student population of the school district is majority minority: 35% Black (48% graduate), 32% White (71% graduate), 18% Hispanic (51% graduate), 15% Asian (68% graduate). As of 2016, the graduation rate for the high school was 56%.

=== Religion ===
The largest religious body is the Catholic church, with 44,000 adherents, followed by Islam, with 6,000 followers. The third-largest religious body is the Reformed Church in America, with 3,600 members. The fourth is the United Methodist denomination, with 2,800 members.

Notable congregations are the First Presbyterian Church (Schenectady, New York), which is affiliated with the PCA. First Reformed Church RCA, formed in the 17th century, is one of the oldest churches in the town. St George's Episcopal Church dates back to 1735; it shared facilities with the Presbyterians for more than 30 years.

== Government ==
Schenectady has a mayor-council government. The mayor is elected for a four-year term with no term limits. The Schenectady City Council has seven seats (councilors), who serve four-year terms and are elected alternately.

== Transportation ==
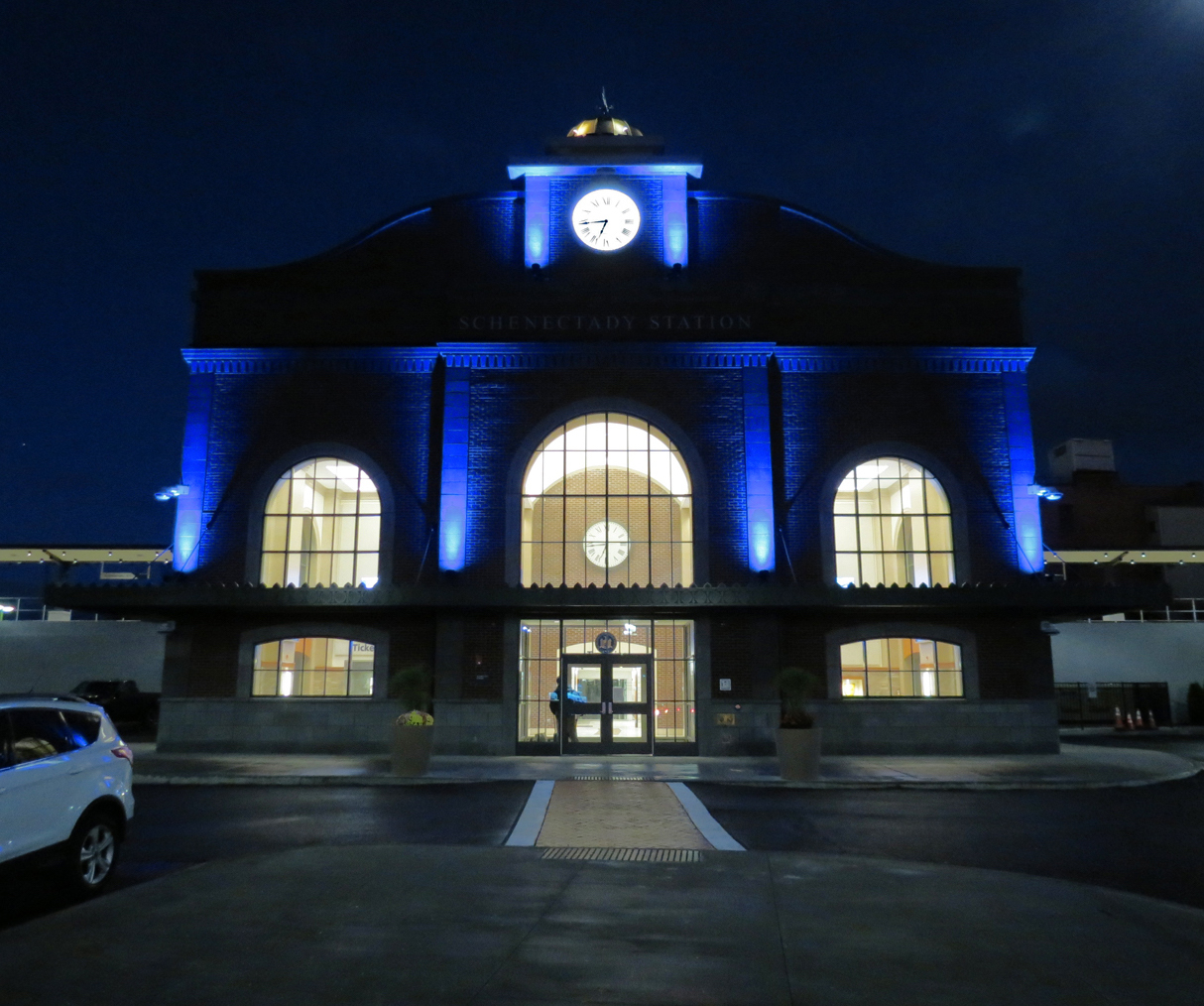
Schenectady station, rebuilt in 2018

Amtrak, the national passenger rail system, provides regular service to Schenectady, with Schenectady station at 322 Erie Boulevard. Trains include the Ethan Allen, Adirondack, Lake Shore Limited, Maple Leaf, and Empire Service. Schenectady also has freight rail service from Canadian Pacific Railway and Norfolk Southern Railway.

The Capital District Transportation Authority provides bus service throughout Schenectady, along with connections to the surrounding cities of Albany, Amsterdam, Saratoga Springs, and Troy.

In the early 20th century, Schenectady had an extensive streetcar system that provided both local and interurban passenger service. The Schenectady Railway Co. had local lines and interurban lines serving Albany, Ballston Spa, Saratoga Springs, and Troy. Also, a line ran from Gloversville, Johnstown, Amsterdam, and Scotia into downtown Schenectady operated by the Fonda, Johnstown, and Gloversville Railroad (FJ&G). The nearly 200 leather and glove companies in the Gloversville region generated considerable traffic for the line. Sales representatives carrying product sample cases began their sales campaigns throughout the rest of the country by taking the interurban to reach Schenectady's New York Central Railroad station, where they connected to trains to New York City, Chicago, and points between.

The bright orange FJ&G interurbans were scheduled to meet every daylight New York Central train that stopped at Schenectady. Through the 1900s and into the early 1930s, the line was quite prosperous. In 1932, the FJ&G purchased five lightweight "bullet cars" (#125 through 129) from the J. G. Brill Company. These interurbans represented state-of-the-art design: the "bullet" description referred to the unusual front roof that was designed to slope down to the windshield in an aerodynamically sleek way. FJ&G bought the cars believing that strong passenger business from a prosperous glove and leather industry would continue, as well as legacy tourism traffic to Lake Sacandaga north of Gloversville. Instead, roads were improved, automobiles became cheaper and were purchased more widely, tourists traveled greater distances by car, and the Great Depression decreased business overall.

FJ&G ridership continued to decline, and in 1938, the state condemned the line's bridge over the Mohawk River at Schenectady. The bridge had once carried cars, pedestrians, and the interurban, but ice flow damage in 1928 prompted the state to restrict its use to the interurban. When the state condemned the bridge for interurban use, the line abandoned passenger service, and the bullet cars were sold. Freight business had also been important to the FJ&G, and it continued over the risky bridge into Schenectady a few more years.

The Mohawk River at Schenectady is crossed by the Western Gateway Bridge, originally built in 1923–25, and replaced in 1971. From 1874 to 1925 the Mohawk River had been crossed by a bridge running from the foot of Washington Ave., Schenectady to Washington Ave., Scotia, a steel bridge built upon the seven piers of a former wooden bridge, built in 1808, called the Burr Bridge.

== Places of interest ==
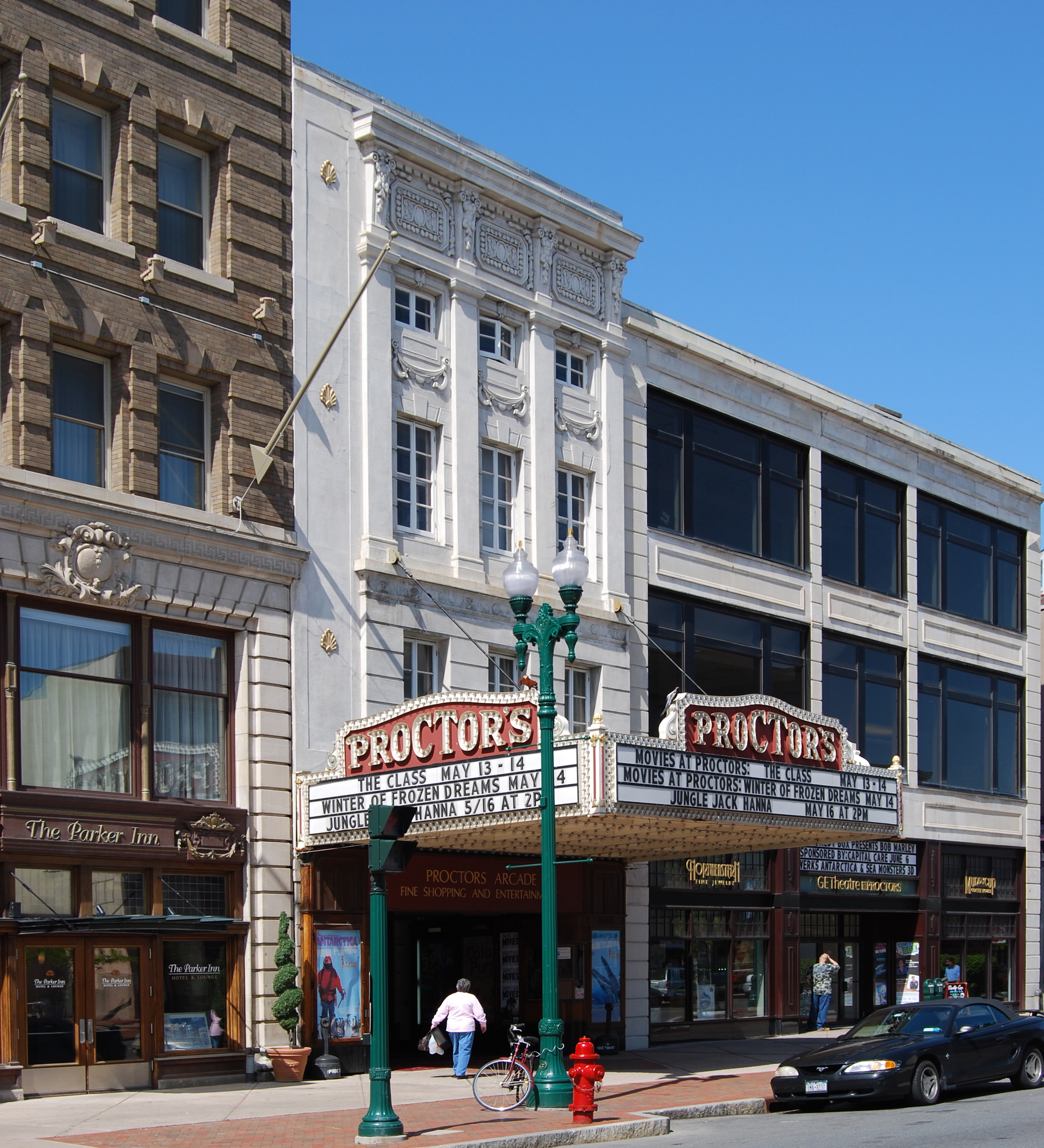
Proctors Theatre

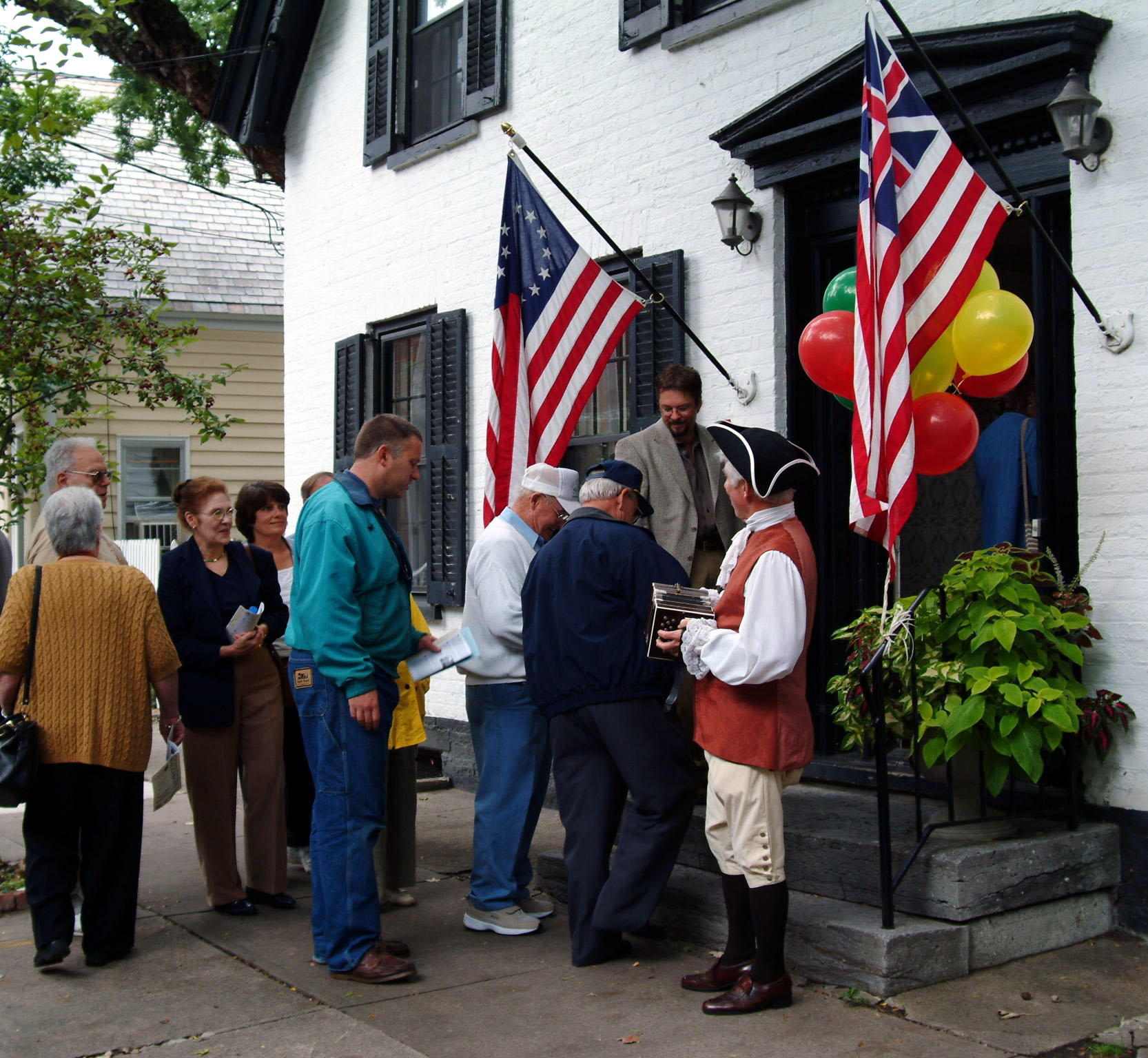
A concertina-playing guide welcomes visitors to a restored Dutch home in the Stockade Historic District

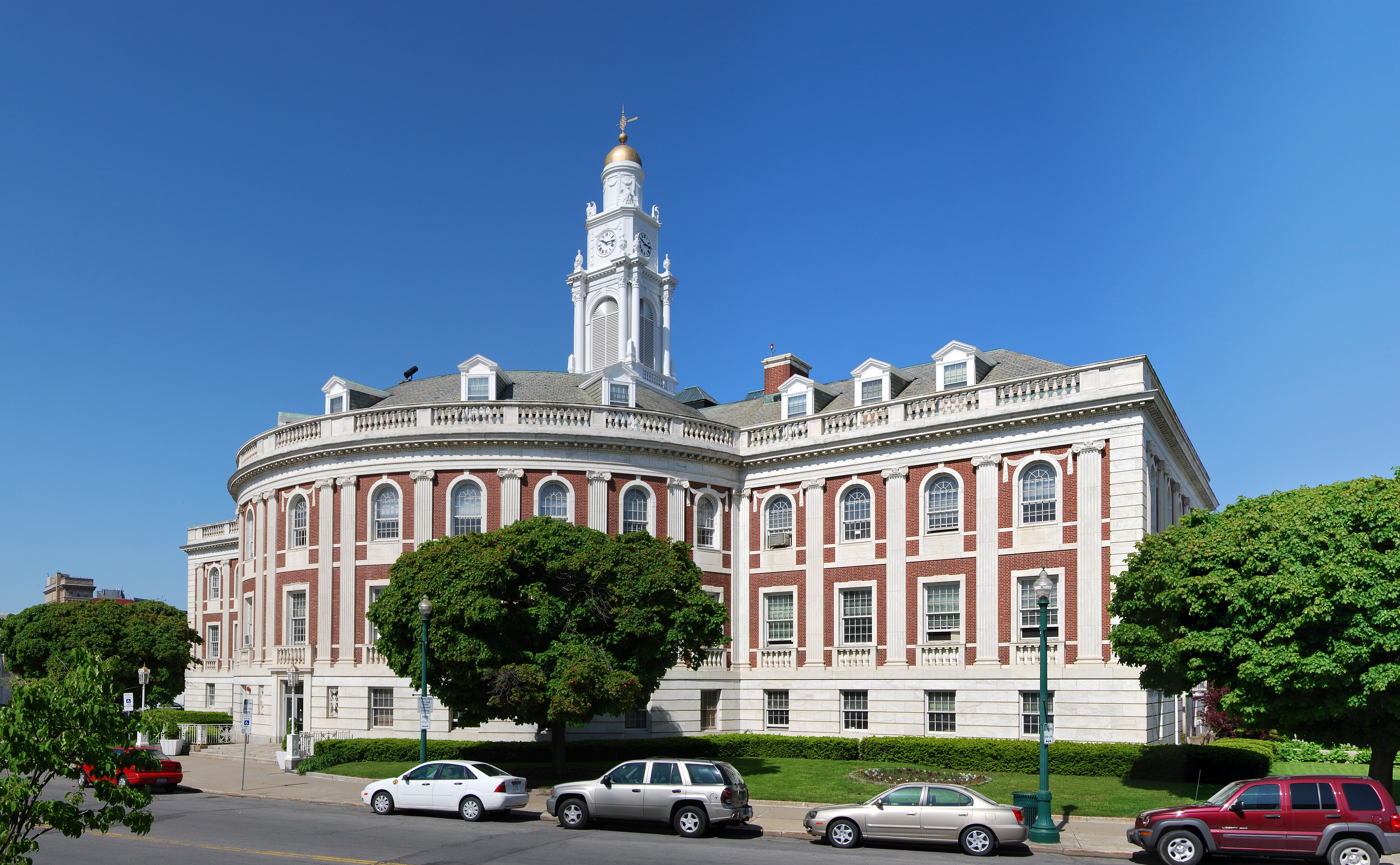
Schenectady City Hall

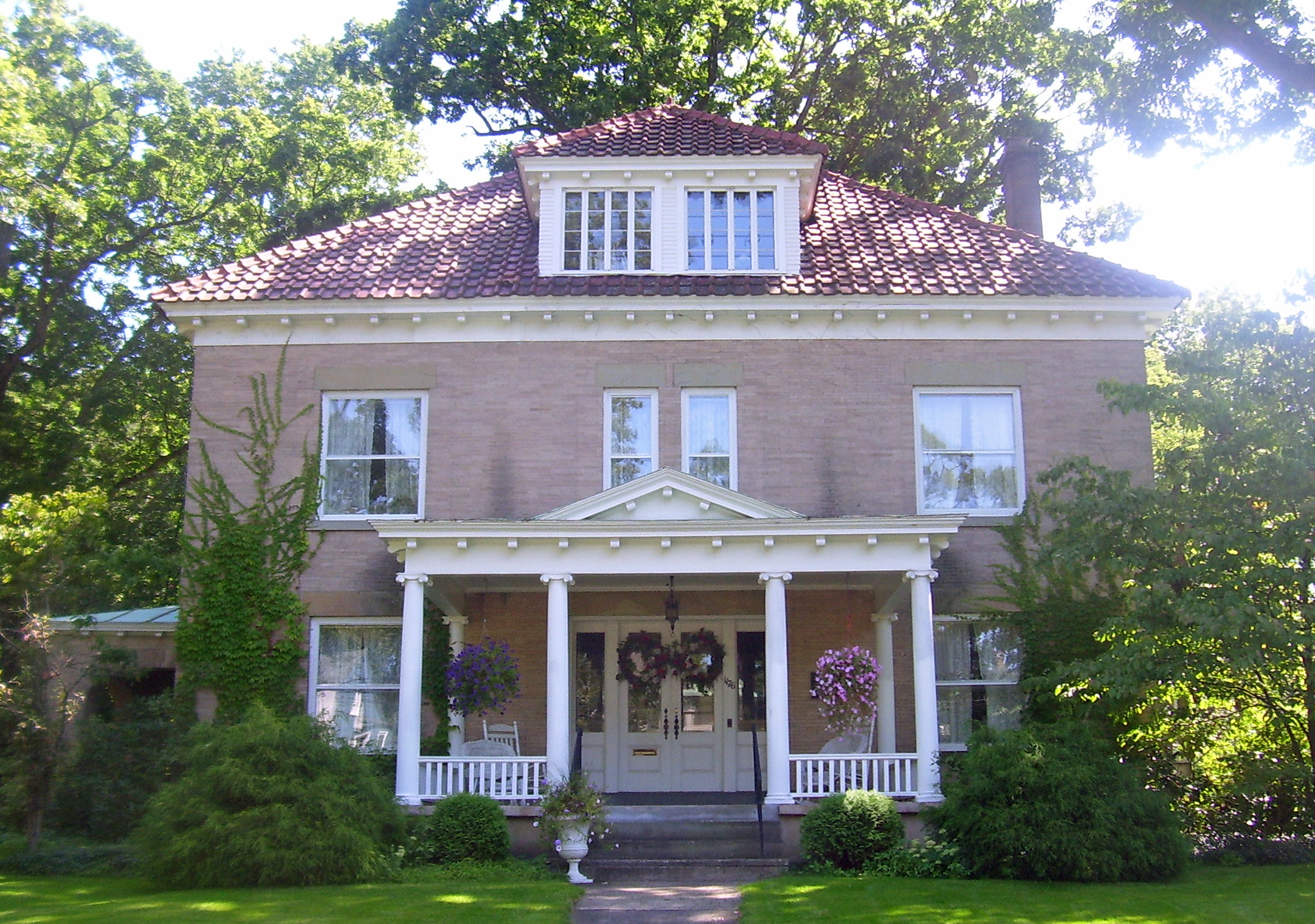
The historic Irving Langmuir House in the GE Plot abutting Union College

- Proctors Theatre is a multi-stage arts center in downtown Schenectady. Built in 1926 as a vaudeville/movie theater, the building was almost demolished prior to a significant restoration in the late 1970s. Major expansions in the early 21st century gave the mainstage ability to host more elaborate touring Broadway shows, and established two new stages: the GE Theatre, and 440 Upstairs. Proctor's was also the site of one of the first public demonstrations of television, projecting an image from a studio at the GE plant a mile [1.6 km] away. It is home to "Goldie", a Wurlitzer theater pipe organ.
- The Stockade Historic District features dozens of Dutch and English Colonial houses from the 18th and 19th centuries. It is the state of New York's first historic district, designated in 1965 by the Department of Interior and named after the historic stockade that originally surrounded the colonial settlement.
- The Schenectady County Historical Society has a History Museum and the Grems-Doolittle research library, both at 32 Washington Avenue in the Stockade District. It has adapted a house originally built in 1895 for the Jackson family. It was used by the GE Women's Club from 1915 until 1957, when it was donated to the Historical Society. The History Museum tells of the history of Schenectady, the Yates Doll House, the Erie Canal, the Glen-Sanders Collection, etc. The research library has many collections of papers, photographs, and books. It welcomes people doing local and genealogical research.
- The General Electric Realty Plot, abutting Union College, was one of the first planned residential neighborhoods in the US, and was designed to attract GE executives in the late 19th and early 20th centuries. It features an eclectic collection of grand homes in a variety of architectural styles, including Tudor, Dutch Colonial, Queen Anne, and Spanish Colonial. The plot is home to the first all-electric home in the United States. It hosts an annual House and Garden Tour.
- Union College, adjacent to the GE Realty Plot, is the oldest planned college campus in the United States. It features the unique 16-sided Nott Memorial building, built in 1875, and Jackson's Garden, 8 acres (32,000 m^{2}) of formal gardens and woodlands.
- Central Park is the crown jewel of Schenectady's parks. It occupies the highest elevation point in the city. The Common Council voted in 1913 to purchase the land for the present site of the park. The park features an acclaimed rose garden and Iroquois Lake. Its stadium tennis court was the former home to the New York Buzz of the World Team Tennis league (as of 2008). Central Park was named after New York City's Central Park.
- The Schenectady Museum features exhibits on the development of science and technology. It contains the Suits-Bueche Planetarium.
- Schenectady City Hall is the focal point of city government. Designed by McKim, Mead and White, it was built in 1933 during the Great Depression.
- Schenectady's Municipal Golf Course is an 18-hole championship facility sited among oaks and pines. Designed in 1935 by Jim Thompson under the WPA, the course was ranked by Golf Digest among "Best Places to Play in 2004" and received a three-star rating.
- Jay Street, between Proctor's and City Hall, is a short street partially closed to motor traffic. It features a number of small, independently operated businesses and eateries, and is a popular destination. Just past the pedestrian section of Jay Street is Schenectady's Little Italy on North Jay Street.
- Schenectady Light Opera Company is a community theater group on Franklin Street in downtown Schenectady.
- The Edison Tech Center exhibits and promotes the physical development of engineering and technology from Schenectady and elsewhere. It provides online and onsite displays that promote learning about electricity and its applications in technology.
- Upper Union Street Business Improvement District, near the Niskayuna boundary, is home to almost 100 independently owned businesses, including a score of restaurants, upscale retail, specialty shops, salons and services.
- Vale Cemetery, listed on the National Register of Historic Places, includes more than 30,000 burials of noted and ordinary residents of the city. It includes the historic African-American Burying Ground, where city residents annually celebrate anniversaries of Juneteenth and Emancipation.

== Education ==
The city is served by the Schenectady City School District, which operates 16 elementary schools, three middle schools, and the main high school, Schenectady High School. Brown School is a private, nonsectarian kindergarten-through-eighth grade school. Catholic schools are administered by the Diocese of Albany.

Wildwood School is a special education, all-ages school.

Schenectady's tertiary educational institutions are Union College, a private liberal arts college, and Schenectady County Community College, a public community college.

== Sports ==
Schenectady is currently home to the New York Phoenix of 94x50 League, which play their home games at M&T Bank Center. The city formerly hosted the Schenectady Legends of the Independent Basketball Association from 2014 to 2017.

It was previously home to baseball teams including the Schenectady Electricians (1895–1909), Schenectady Mohawk Giants (1913–1914), and Schenectady Blue Jays (1946–1957).

The Schenectady Chiefs hockey team called the city home from 1981 to 1982.

From 2003 to 2010, the city was home to the Albany BWP Highlanders soccer team.

== Representation in popular culture ==
Due to its early importance in national history and the economy, Schenectady frequently appears in popular culture.

=== Fiction ===
- In author Jacqueline Woodson's memoir Brown Girl Dreaming, the main character's friend Maria travels to Schenectady.
- Author Henry James gave his lead character Daisy Miller, in his 1878 novella of the same name, an origin in Schenectady.
- Schenectady is referred to or the setting for several of Kurt Vonnegut's books, most notably Hocus Pocus and Player Piano.
- Doctor Octopus, a Marvel Comics supervillain, was born in Schenectady.
- Joseph S. Pulver, Sr.'s Lovecraftian serial killer novel, Nightmare's Disciple (Chaosium, 1999) is set in Schenectady.
- Science-fiction writer Isaac Asimov placed the corporate headquarters and factory of U.S. Robots and Mechanical Men, Inc. (fictional 21st-century manufacturer of robots) in Schenectady.
- Science-fiction writer Harlan Ellison said that anytime a fan or interviewer asked him, "Where do you get your ideas?", he would reply "Schenectady". Science fiction writer Barry Longyear subsequently titled a collection of his short stories It Came From Schenectady.

=== Film and TV ===
- In Objective, Burma! (1945), Sid Jacobs (William Prince) tells Mark Williams (Henry Hull) about his house at 791 Crane Street in Schenectady. He had taught at Pleasant Valley school before the war.
- In the 1952 Looney Tunes short Fool Coverage, Daffy Duck plays an insurance salesman from the Hotfoot Casualty Underwriters Insurance Company of Schenectady.
- In the 1950s television series The Honeymooners, Trixie's mother is from Schenectady.
- The Way We Were (1973) was filmed on location at Union College, and in nearby Ballston Spa.
- The 1980s film Heart Like a Wheel is mostly set in Schenectady.
- The 1996 made-for-TV film Unabomber: The True Story starring Robert Hays as David Kaczynski, brother of Unabomber Ted Kaczynski, refers to Schenectady, where David and his wife were living when they figured out his brother's involvement in the bombings.
- The Time Machine (2002), the remake starring Guy Pearce, features Schenectady's Central Park in the ice-skating scenes, standing in for New York City's Central Park.
- Synecdoche, New York (2008) is a film partially set in Schenectady, where some scenes were shot. It plays on the aural similarity between the city's name and the figure of speech synecdoche.
- In the ABC-TV series Ugly Betty, Marc St. James (played by Michael Urie) is said to be from Schenectady.
- Winter of Frozen Dreams (2009) was entirely filmed in Schenectady County, but is set in Wisconsin, where the historic events took place. It features the Schenectady, the Town of Rotterdam, and the Village of Scotia, all in New York. The film stars Thora Birch as Barbara Hoffman, the historic Wisconsin murderer, and Keith Carradine as a detective determined to catch her.
- The Place Beyond the Pines (2013), starring Bradley Cooper and Ryan Gosling, was filmed locally in 2011 near the Schenectady Police Headquarters and other areas of Schenectady.
- In the NBC sitcom Will & Grace, Schenectady is the hometown of character Grace Adler (played by Debra Messing).

=== Music ===
- The music video for the song "Hero" by Mariah Carey was filmed at Proctors Theatre in Schenectady.
- The song "Someone to Love" by Fountains of Wayne, refers to fictional character Seth Shapiro moving from Schenectady in 1993 to Brooklyn.
- The song "Join the Circus", the last major number in Cy Coleman's musical Barnum, mentions the city in its lyric.

== Notable people ==
- Stephen Alexander (1806–1883), astronomer, mathematician, and educator
- Horatio Allen (1802–1889), railroad engineer and inventor
- Ralph Alpher (1921–2007), cosmologist, won National Medal of Science for seminal work on the Big Bang theory
- Chester Arthur (1829–1886), US President, lived in Schenectady, with his family and later while attending Union College
- Kumar Barve (born 1958), Majority Leader and first Indian-American legislator in the Maryland House of Delegates
- Suzanne Basso, murderer
- Nicholas F. Beck (1796–1830), Adjutant General of New York
- Katharine Burr Blodgett (1898 – 1979), physicist, chemist, and first woman awarded PhD in physics from University of Cambridge
- Andy Bloom (born 1973), Olympic shot putter
- Jim Barbieri (born 1941), MLB outfielder who played for Schenectady's 1954 Little League World Series championship team
- Maria Brink (born 1977), lead singer of band In This Moment, was born in Schenectady
- Pat Cadigan (born 1953), science-fiction author, was born in Schenectady
- Greg Capullo (born 1962), comic-book artist, was born in Schenectady
- Bruce W. Carter (1950–1969), USMC, Medal of Honor recipient, was born in Schenectady
- Jimmy Carter (1924–2024), US President, studied briefly at Union College
- Billy Connors (1941–2018), MLB pitcher, coach and executive who played for Schenectady's 1954 Little League World Series championship team
- Jackie Craven, architectural writer
- Dexter Curtis (1828–1898), Wisconsin state assemblyman, was born in Schenectady
- Mary Daly (1928–2010), feminist theologian
- Ann B. Davis (1926–2014), actress (Schultzy on The Bob Cummings Show and Alice Nelson on The Brady Bunch), was born in Schenectady
- Antonio Delgado (born 1977), Lieutenant Governor of New York, and former US Representative
- Amir Derakh (born 1963), guitarist for rock band Orgy, was born in Schenectady
- Robert M. Devlin (born 1941), former CEO of American General
- Paul "Legs" DiCocco (1924–1989), gambler and racketeer
- John Owen Dominis (1832–1891), prince consort of Queen Liliuokalani of Hawaii
- Jamie Dukes (born 1964), football player, born in Schenectady
- Harry J. Flynn (1933–2019), Roman Catholic archbishop of Minneapolis and St. Paul, was born in Schenectady
- Henry Glen (1739–1814), Continental army officer, US Representative
- Harold Gould (1923–2010), actor (The Golden Girls, The Sting), was born in Schenectady
- Harold J. Greene (1959–2014), United States Army general
- Kevin Greene (1962–2020), football linebacker, coach
- Joseph E. Grosberg (1883–1970), pioneer in supermarket and wholesale foods industries
- Thomas W. Harman (1707–1848), Adjutant General of New York
- John E. Hart (1824–1863), Union Navy officer
- Keith Hitchins (1931–2020), American historian
- Gilbert Hyatt (ca. 1761–1823), loyalist, founder of Sherbrooke, Quebec
- Fred Isabella (1917–2007), dentist, businessman, and politician
- Patricia Kalember (born 1957), actress, born in Schenectady
- Steve Katz (born 1945), guitarist (Blood, Sweat & Tears)
- Barry Kramer (born 1942), basketball player, jurist
- Irving Langmuir (1881–1957), 1932 Nobel laureate in chemistry
- Wayne LaPierre (born 1949), CEO of the National Rifle Association of America
- Arnold Lobel (1933–1987), author and illustrator of children's books, was born in Los Angeles and raised in Schenectady
- George R. Lunn, (1873–1948), mayor, US Representative, lieutenant governor
- Ranald MacDougall (1915–1973), screenwriter and director
- Sir Charles Mackerras (1925–2010), Australian conductor, was born in Schenectady.
- John Van Antwerp MacMurray (1881–1960), US–China expert
- Donald Martiny (born 1953), artist
- Arnold Mindell (1940–2024), writer and psychotherapist
- Tom Moulton (born 1940), record producer
- Shirley Muldowney (born 1940), auto racer in International Motorsports Hall of Fame, born and raised in Schenectady
- Mordecai Myers (1776–1871), mayor of Schenectady
- Ray Nelson (1931–2022), science-fiction author and cartoonist, born in Schenectady
- Sterling Newberry, inventor, worked at General Electric in Schenectady
- Eliphalet Nott (1773–1866), president of Union College
- David Opdyke (born 1969), visual artist
- John Palasik (1954–2022), Vermont state legislator, born in Schenectady
- Jean-Hervé Peron (born 1949), German rock musician, lived in Schenectady in 1967–1968 as an exchange student
- Jacob Van Vechten Platto (1822–1898), Wisconsin state assemblyman
- Joseph S. Pulver (1955–2020), novelist, poet, editor, born in Schenectady
- Pat Riley (born 1945), NBA player, executive and Hall of Fame coach, was born in Rome, NY, and lived in Schenectady
- Don Rittner, author and historian, lived in Schenectady
- Ron Rivest (born 1947), cryptographer, co-inventor of RSA cryptography
- Walter G. Robinson (1879–1940), Adjutant General of New York
- Lewis K. Rockefeller (1875–1948), US Representative, born in Schenectady
- Al Romano (born 1954), football player
- Margaret Rotundo (born 1949), Maine legislator
- Mickey Rourke (born 1952), Academy Award-nominated actor, born in Schenectady
- R. Tom Sawyer (1901–1986), engineer, writer and inventor of the first successful gas turbine locomotive, born in Schenectady
- John Sayles (born 1950), film director and Academy Award-nominated screenwriter, born and raised in Schenectady
- Vincent J. Schaefer (1906–1993), chemist, meteorologist
- Amalie Schoppe (1791–1858), German writer
- Michael H. Schill (born 1958), president of Northwestern University
- Ben Schwartz (born 1981), actor, (Jean-Ralphio Saperstein on Parks and Recreation), graduated from Union College in 2003
- William H. Seward (1801–1872), Abolitionist Republican Governor of New York, US Senator, US Secretary of State during and after the Civil War
- Nehemiah Shumway (1761–1843), teacher and musical composer, lived in Schenectady
- Kenneth Schermerhorn (1929–2005), conductor of Nashville Symphony, born in Schenectady
- Simon J. Schermerhorn (1827–1901), US Representative
- Lawrence W. Sherman (born 1949), experimental criminologist and police educator
- Gerald Stano (1951–1998), serial killer
- Charles Proteus Steinmetz (1865–1923), mathematician, electrical engineer, developer of alternating current
- Brian U. Stratton (born 1957), mayor, director of the New York State Canal Corporation
- Samuel S. Stratton (1916–1990), mayor, US representative, father of Brian Stratton
- John Sykes (born 1955), co-founder of MTV: Music Television, Chairman of The Rock & Roll Hall of Fame, raised in Schenectady
- Frank Taberski (1889–1941), billiards champion; born in Schenectady
- Lynne Talley (born 1954), oceanographer, born in Schenectady
- Marybeth Tinning (born 1942), serial killer
- John Tudor (born 1954), MLB pitcher
- Deborah Van Valkenburgh (born 1952), actress (The Warriors), was born in Schenectady
- Kurt Vonnegut (1922–2007), author, lived in Schenectady while working for GE in the early 1950s
- Lee Wallard (1910–1963), race car driver
- George H. Wells (1833–1905), Confederate officer, attorney and member of the Louisiana State Senate
- Casper Wells (born 1984), MLB outfielder
- George Westinghouse (1846–1914), engineer and inventor, grew up in Schenectady
- Andrew Yang (born 1975), entrepreneur, 2020 Democratic presidential candidate, 2021 New York City mayor candidate
- Charles Yates (1808–1870), Union Army brigadier general during the American Civil War, nephew of Joseph Christopher Yates
- Joseph Christopher Yates (1768–1837), governor of New York
- Clifton Young (1917–1951), actor
- Lisa Barlow (born 1974), television personality, raised in Schenectady
