= Wainscot (disambiguation) =

Wainscot is a panelling, often wooden, applied to an interior wall of a building.

Wainscot may also refer to:

== Moths ==
Family Crambidae

- Wainscot grass-veneer, Eoreuma densellus

Family Gelechiidae

- Wainscot neb, Monochroa palustrellus

Family Noctuidae

- Adjutant wainscot, Leucania adjuta
- Blair's wainscot, Sedina buettneri
- Brighton wainscot, Oria musculosa
- Brown-veined wainscot, Archanara dissoluta
- Bulrush wainscot, Nonagria typhae
- Comma wainscot, Leucania commoides
- Common wainscot, Mythimna pallens
- Devonshire wainscot, Leucania putrescens
- False wainscot, Leucania pseudargyria
- Fen wainscot, Arenostola phragmitidis
- Fenn's wainscot, Protarchanara brevilinea
- Flame wainscot, Senta flammea
- Heterodox wainscot, Leucania insueta
- Isle of Wight wainscot, Rhizedra lutosa
- L-album wainscot, Mythimna l-album
- Large wainscot, Rhizedra lutosa
- Lesser wainscot, Mythimna oxygala
- Linda wainscot, Leucania linda
- Linen wainscot, Leucania linita
- Many-lined wainscot, Leucania multilinea
- Mathew's wainscot, Mythimna favicolor
- Meadow wainscot, Leucania farcta
- Mere wainscot, Chortodes fluxa
- Morris's wainscot, Chortodes morrisii
- Obscure wainscot, Mythimna obsoleta
- Orange astelia wainscot, Ichneutica purdii
- Oregon wainscot, Leucania oregona
- Phragmites wainscot, Leucania phragmitidicola
- Rush wainscot, Capsula algae
- Sand wainscot, Apamea lintneri
- Scirpus wainscot, Leucania scirpicola
- Shore wainscot, Mythimna litoralis
- Shoulder-striped wainscot, Leucania comma
- Silky wainscot, Chilodes maritimus
- Small wainscot, Denticucullus pygmina
- Smoky wainscot, Mythimna impura
- Sordid wainscot, Hypocoena inquinata
- Southern wainscot, Mythimna straminea
- Striped wainscot, Mythimna pudorina
- Twin-spotted wainscot, Archanara geminipuncta
- Two-lined wainscot, Leucania commoides
- Unarmed wainscot, Leucania inermis
- Ursula wainscot, Leucania ursula
- Webb's wainscot, Capsula sparganii
- White-dotted wainscot, Leucania subpunctata
- White-mantled wainscot, Archanara neurica

Family Ypsolophidae

- Wainscot hooktip, Ypsolopha scabrella
- Wainscot smudge, Ypsolopha scabrella

== Other uses ==
- Wainscot chair, a type of chair common in early 17th-century England and colonial America
- Wainscot society, a speculative fiction trope involving an invisible or undetected society

== See also ==
- Wainscott (disambiguation)
