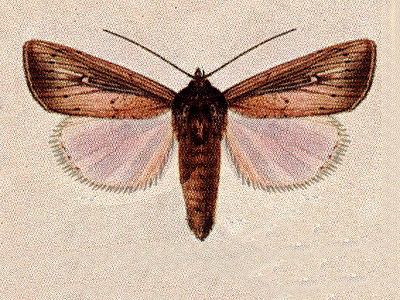

Scientific classification
- Domain: Eukaryota
- Kingdom: Animalia
- Phylum: Arthropoda
- Class: Insecta
- Order: Lepidoptera
- Superfamily: Noctuoidea
- Family: Noctuidae
- Genus: Leucania
- Species: L. latiuscula

Binomial name
- Leucania latiuscula Herrich-Schäffer, 1868

= Leucania latiuscula =

Species of moth

Leucania latiuscula is a moth of the family Noctuidae. It is native to the Caribbean and might be introduced to Hawaii.

== Taxonomy ==
Leucania latiuscula is part of a species group including Leucania subpunctata and Leucania senescens. These three species are so similar, they can only be distinguished by examination of genitalia. Until recently, subpunctata and senescens were considered synonyms of latiuscula.
