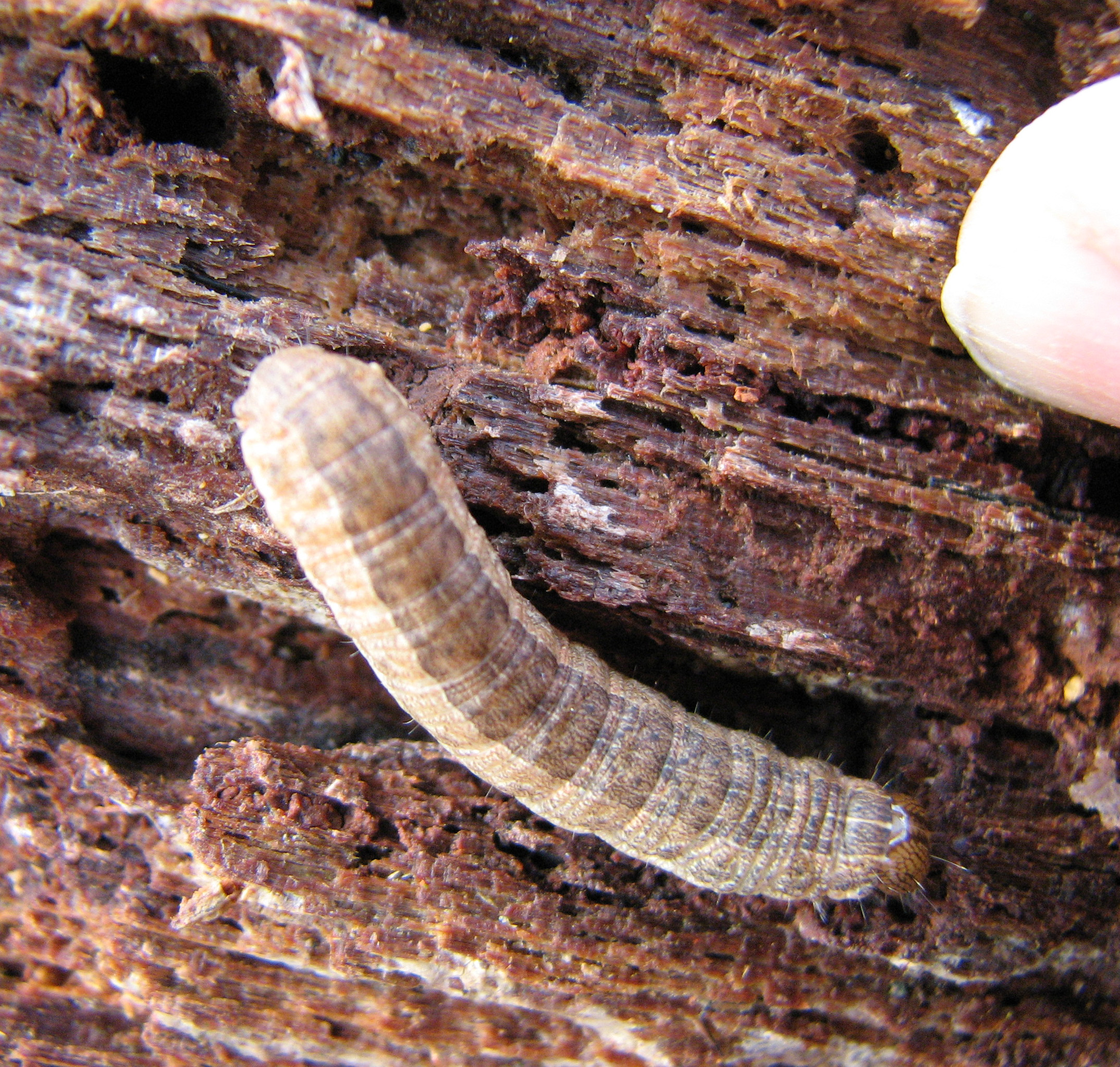
- Leucaniini caterpillar (possibly Leucania pseudargyria)

Scientific classification
- Kingdom: Animalia
- Phylum: Arthropoda
- Class: Insecta
- Order: Lepidoptera
- Superfamily: Noctuoidea
- Family: Noctuidae
- Tribe: Leucaniini
- Genus: Leucania; Ochsenheimer, 1816

= Leucania =

Genus of moths

Leucania is a genus of moths of the family Noctuidae first described by Ferdinand Ochsenheimer in 1816.

== Description ==
Palpi obliquely upturned, where the second joint roughly scaled, and prominent, short, naked and depressed third joint. The proboscis is well developed. Its eyes are hairy. Antennae minutely ciliated in male. Head not deeply retracted into the thorax, which is smoothly scaled. Abdomen with scarcely a trace of dorsal tufts on basal segments. Tibia and tarsi with short hairs. Forewings with vein 8 and 9 anastomosing (fusing) to form the areole. Vein 7 being given off from the end of it. Vein 10 before the end.

== Species ==
- Leucania abdominalis (Walker, 1856)
- Leucania acrapex (Hampson, 1905)
- Leucania adjuta (Grote, 1874)
- Leucania aedesiusi (Rougeot & Laporte, 1983)
- Leucania agnata (Draudt, 1950)
- Leucania albifasciata (Hampson, 1905)
- Leucania albimacula (Gaede, 1916)
- Leucania albistigma Moore, 1881
- Leucania albistriga Maassen, 1890
- Leucania alboradiata (Hampson, 1905)
- Leucania alopa Meyrick, 1887
- Leucania amens Guenée, 1852
- Leucania anteroclara Smith, 1902
- Leucania apparata Wallengren, 1875
- Leucania arcupunctata Maassen, 1890
- Leucania argyrina (Laporte, 1984)
- Leucania atrifera (Hampson, 1905)
- Leucania atrimacula Hampson, 1902
- Leucania atrinota (Hampson, 1905)
- Leucania atrisignata (Hampson, 1918)
- Leucania atritorna (Hampson, 1911)
- Leucania badia Maassen, 1890
- Leucania basilinea Swinhoe, 1890
- Leucania baziyae Möschler, 1883
- Leucania biforis (Draudt, 1924)
- Leucania bilinea Maassen, 1890
- Leucania bilineata (Hampson, 1905)
- Leucania bisetulata (Berio, 1940)
- Leucania brantsii Snellen, 1872
- Leucania calidior (Forbes, 1936)
- Leucania canariensis Rebel, 1894
- Leucania carminata (Hampson, 1918)
- Leucania carnea (Draudt, 1924)
- Leucania carneotincta (Kenrick, 1917)
- Leucania celebensis (Tams, 1935)
- Leucania chejela (Schaus, 1921)
- Leucania chilensis Butler, 1882
- Leucania cholica (Dyar, 1919)
- Leucania cinereicollis Walker, 1858
- Leucania clara (Draudt, 1924)
- Leucania clarescens Möschler, 1890
- Leucania clavifera (Hampson, 1907)
- Leucania comma (Linnaeus, 1761) – shoulder-striped wainscot
- Leucania commoides Guenée, 1852
- Leucania confluens (Bethune-Baker, 1909)
- Leucania confundens Walker, 1858
- Leucania continentalis Berio, 1962
- Leucania cooperi (Schaus, 1923)
- Leucania corrugata Hampson, 1894
- Leucania cruegeri Butler, 1886
- Leucania cupreata (Hampson, 1905)
- Leucania curvilinea Hampson, 1891
- Leucania cyprium (Laporte, 1984)
- Leucania dasycnema (Turner, 1912)
- Leucania dia (Grote, 1879)
- Leucania diagramma Bethune-Baker, 1905
- Leucania diatrecta Butler, 1886
- Leucania diopis (Hampson, 1905)
- Leucania dorsalis Walker, 1856
- Leucania ebriosa Guenée, 1852
- Leucania erecta Hreblay, 1999
- Leucania exclamans Berio, 1973
- Leucania extincta Guenée, 1852
- Leucania eyre (Schaus, 1938)
- Leucania ezrami (Schaus, 1938)
- Leucania fagani (Schaus, 1938)
- Leucania falklandica Butler, 1893
- Leucania farcta (Grote, 1881)
- Leucania fasilidasi (Laporte, 1984)
- Leucania februalis (Hill, 1924)
- Leucania ficta Walker, 1866
- Leucania fissifascia (Hampson, 1907)
- Leucania fiyu Hreblay & Yoshimatsu, 1998
- Leucania fortunata (Pinker, 1961)
- Leucania fragilis (Butler, 1883)
- Leucania guascana (Schaus, 1938)
- Leucania hamata Wallengren, 1856
- Leucania hartii Howes, 1914
- Leucania haywardi (Köhler, 1947)
- Leucania herrichii Herrich-Schäffer, [1849]
- Leucania hildrani (Schaus, 1938)
- Leucania homoeoptera (Hampson, 1918)
- Leucania humidicola Guenée, 1852
- Leucania hypocapna (de Joannis, 1932)
- Leucania imperfecta Smith, 1894
- Leucania impuncta Guenée, 1852
- Leucania inangulata (Gaede, 1934)
- Leucania incognita (Barnes & McDunnough, 1918)
- Leucania incompleta (Berio, 1970)
- Leucania inconspicua Herrich-Schäffer, 1868
- Leucania ineana Snellen, 1880
- Leucania ineata Snellen, 1880
- Leucania inermis (Forbes, 1936)
- Leucania infatuans Franclemont, 1972
- Leucania innotata Howes, 1908
- Leucania inouei Sugi, 1965
- Leucania insecuta Walker, 1865
- Leucania insueta Guenée, 1852
- Leucania insulicola Guenée, 1852
- Leucania interciliata Hampson, 1902
- Leucania internata Möschler, 1883
- Leucania irregularis (Walker, 1857)
- Leucania jaliscana Schaus, 1898
- Leucania joannisi Boursin & Rungs, 1952
- Leucania kathmandica Hreblay, Legrain & Yoshimatsu, 1996
- Leucania kirschi Maassen, 1890
- Leucania lacteola Christoph, 1893
- Leucania lacticinia (Dognin, 1914)
- Leucania lapidaria (Grote, 1876)
- Leucania latericia Holloway, 1979
- Leucania latiuscula Herrich-Schäffer, 1868
- Leucania leucogramma (Hampson, 1905)
- Leucania leucophlebia (Hampson, 1918)
- Leucania leucospila (Hampson, 1918)
- Leucania leucosta Lower, 1901
- Leucania leucostigma Snellen, 1877
- Leucania lewinii Butler, 1886
- Leucania lilloana (Köhler, 1947)
- Leucania lilloana (Köhler, 1947)
- Leucania linda Franclemont, 1952
- Leucania linearis Lucas, 1892
- Leucania lineolatoides Poole, 1989
- Leucania linita Guenée, 1852
- Leucania lobrega Adams, 2001
- Leucania longipennis (Hampson, 1905)
- Leucania loreyi (Duponchel, 1827)
- Leucania lucentia Maassen, 1890
- Leucania macellaria (Draudt, 1924)
- Leucania macoya (Schaus, 1921)
- Leucania mediolacteata (Berio, 1941)
- Leucania megaproctis (Hampson, 1905)
- Leucania melanostrota (Hampson, 1905)
- Leucania melianoides Möschler, 1884
- Leucania metasarca (Hampson, 1907)
- Leucania miasticta (Hampson, 1918)
- Leucania microgonia (Hampson, 1905)
- Leucania micropis (Hampson, 1905)
- Leucania microsticha (Hampson, 1905)
- Leucania misteca Schaus, 1898
- Leucania mocoides Dognin, 1897
- Leucania multilinea Walker, 1856
- Leucania multipunctata Druce, 1889
- Leucania murcida (Wallengren, 1875)
- Leucania musakensis Laporte, 1977
- Leucania nabalua Holloway, 1976
- Leucania nebulosa Hampson, 1902
- Leucania negrottoi (Berio, 1940)
- Leucania nigrispara Hampson, 1902
- Leucania nigristriga Hreblay, Legrain & Yoshimatsu, 1998
- Leucania noacki (Boursin, 1967)
- Leucania oaxacana Schaus, 1898
- Leucania obsoleta (Hübner, [1803])
- Leucania obumbrata T.P. Lucas, 1894
- Leucania opalisans (Draudt, 1924)
- Leucania oregona Smith, 1902
- Leucania palaestinae (Staudinger, 1897)
- Leucania paraxysta Meyrick, 1929
- Leucania patrizii (Berio, 1935)
- Leucania pectinata (Hampson, 1905)
- Leucania percussa Butler, 1880
- Leucania persecta (Hampson, 1905)
- Leucania perstriata (Hampson, 1909)
- Leucania perstrigata (Dyar, 1910)
- Leucania petra Hreblay & Yoshimatsu, 1999
- Leucania phaea Hampson, 1902
- Leucania phaeochroa (Hampson, 1905)
- Leucania phaeoneura Hampson, 1913
- Leucania phragmitidicola Guenée, 1852 – phragmites wainscot
  - (Leucania phragmatidicola Guenée, 1852, misspelling)
- Leucania pilipalpis (Grote, 1876)
- Leucania polemusa Swinhoe, 1885
- Leucania polyrabda (Hampson, 1905)
- Leucania polysticha Turner, 1902
- Leucania polystrota (Hampson, 1905)
- Leucania porphyrodes (Turner, 1911)
- Leucania praetexta Townsend, 1956
- Leucania pseudargyria Guenée, 1852
- Leucania pseudoyu (Rothschild, 1915)
- Leucania ptyonophora (Hampson, 1905)
- Leucania punctosa (Treitschke, 1825)
- Leucania punctulata Wallengren, 1856
- Leucania putrescens (Hübner, [1824])
- Leucania pyrastis (Hampson, 1905)
- Leucania quadricuspidata Wallengren, 1856
- Leucania respersa Berio, 1974
- Leucania reticulata Berio, 1962
- Leucania rhabdophora Hampson, 1902
- Leucania rhodopsara (Turner, 1911)
- Leucania rhodoptera (Hampson, 1905)
- Leucania rivorum Guenée, 1852
- Leucania rosea Möschler, 1880
- Leucania roseilinea Walker, 1862
- Leucania roseilineoides Poole, 1989
- Leucania roseivena (Draudt, 1924)
- Leucania rosengreeni Rebel, 1907
- Leucania roseorufa (de Joannis, 1928)
- Leucania rosescens (Hampson, 1910)
- Leucania rubra (Hampson, 1905)
- Leucania rubrescens (Hampson, 1905)
- Leucania rufescenoides Poole, 1989
- Leucania rufidefinita (Hampson, 1918)
- Leucania sanguinis Berio, 1962
- Leucania sarca Hampson, 1902
- Leucania sarcistis (Hampson, 1905)
- Leucania sarcophaea (Hampson, 1905)
- Leucania sarcostriga (Hampson, 1905)
- Leucania scirpicola Guenée, 1852
- Leucania secta Herrich-Schäffer, 1868
- Leucania semiusta Hampson, 1891
- Leucania senescens Möschler, 1890
- Leucania separata (Walker, 1865) see Mythimna separata
- Leucania sericea (Warren, 1915)
- Leucania seteci (Dyar, 1914)
- Leucania simillima Walker, 1862
- Leucania socorrensis (Dognin, 1911)
- Leucania steniptera (Hampson, 1905)
- Leucania stenographa Lower, 1900 – sugar cane armyworm
- Leucania stolata Smith, 1894
- Leucania striata Leech, 1900
- Leucania strigata Maassen, 1890
- Leucania striguscula (Dyar, 1913)
- Leucania subacrapex (Berio, 1970)
- Leucania subdecora (Wileman, 1912)
- Leucania subpunctata (Harvey, 1875)
- Leucania subrubrescens (Warren, 1915)
- Leucania subspurcata Walker, 1866
- Leucania suffusoides Poole, 1989
- Leucania tacuna Felder & Rogenhofer, 1874
- Leucania tenebra (Hampson, 1905)
- Leucania tritonia (Hampson, 1905)
- Leucania uda Guenée, 1852
- Leucania uniformis Moore, 1881
- Leucania ursula (Forbes, 1936)
- Leucania ustata (Hampson, 1907)
- Leucania vana (Swinhoe, 1885)
- Leucania velva (Schaus, 1921)
- Leucania venalba Moore, 1867
- Leucania vibicosa (Turner, 1920)
- Leucania vyndhiae Hreblay & Legrain, 1999
- Leucania yu Guenée, 1852
- Leucania yunnana Chen, 1999
- Leucania zeae (Duponchel, 1827)
