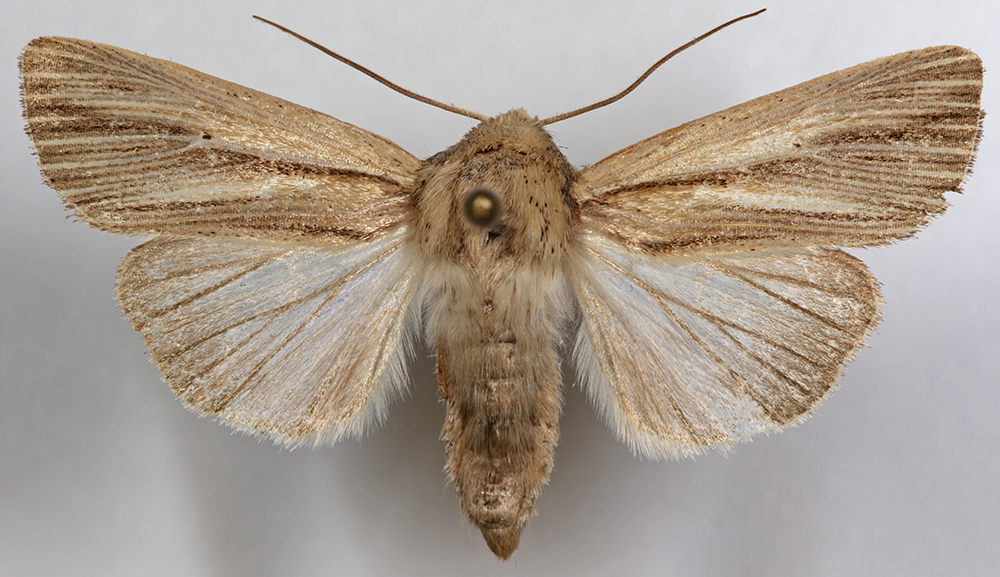

Scientific classification
- Domain: Eukaryota
- Kingdom: Animalia
- Phylum: Arthropoda
- Class: Insecta
- Order: Lepidoptera
- Superfamily: Noctuoidea
- Family: Noctuidae
- Tribe: Leucaniini
- Genus: Leucania
- Species: L. anteroclara

Binomial name
- Leucania anteroclara Smith, 1902

= Leucania anteroclara =

Species of moth

Leucania anteroclara is a species of cutworm or dart moth in the family Noctuidae. It is found in North America.
