= Leucania stolata =

Scientific classification
- Kingdom: Animalia
- Phylum: Arthropoda
- Clade: Pancrustacea
- Class: Insecta
- Order: Lepidoptera
- Superfamily: Noctuoidea
- Family: Noctuidae
- Tribe: Leucaniini
- Genus: Leucania
- Species: L. stolata

Binomial name
- Leucania stolata Smith, 1894

Species of moth

Leucania stolata is a species of cutworm or dart moth in the family Noctuidae. It is found in North America.
