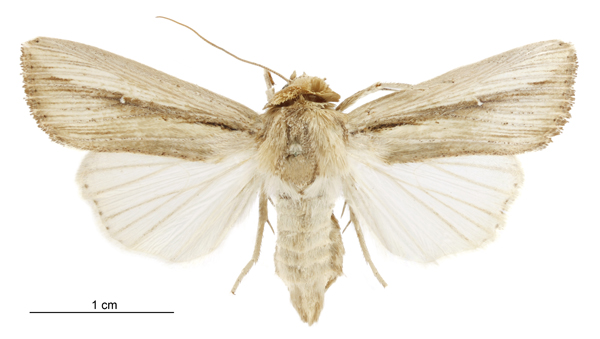
- Female
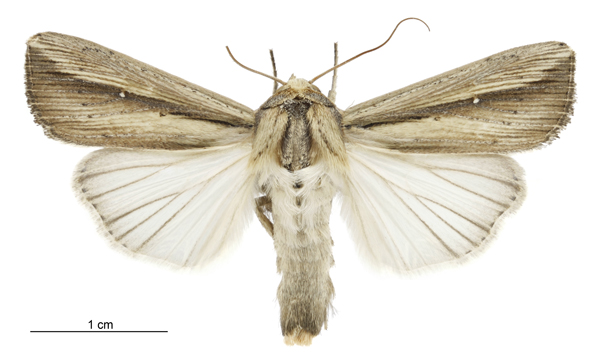
- Male

Scientific classification
- Kingdom: Animalia
- Phylum: Arthropoda
- Class: Insecta
- Order: Lepidoptera
- Superfamily: Noctuoidea
- Family: Noctuidae
- Genus: Leucania
- Species: L. stenographa

Binomial name
- Leucania stenographa Lower, 1900

Synonyms
- Leucania loreyimima Rungs, 1953; Mythimna loreyimima (Rungs, 1953)

= Leucania stenographa =

Species of moth

Leucania stenographa, commonly known as the sugar cane armyworm, is a moth of the family Noctuidae. It is found in Australia, New Zealand and the Cook Islands.

== Taxonomy ==
This species was first described by Oswald Bertram Lower in 1900 using three specimens collected at Parkside, South Australia in June. In 1905 Hampson synonymised this species with L. uda and this placement was accepted by subsequent authors. In 1953 C. Rungs, after studying the male genitalia characteristics of specimens of the species L. foreyi, named a new species Leucania loreyimima. L. loreyimima was subsequently placed in the genus Mythimna. After a specimen labelled with the name stenographa and collected in Parkside was found in Lower's collection at the South Australian Museum, E. D. Edwards revised the taxonomy of L. loreyimima. He examined the specimen and found that it was identical to the Rungs' illustrations of the holotype used by Rungs when first describing L. loreyimima. As a result Edwards synonymised Leucania loreyimima with L. stenographa and recognised it as a valid species.

The term “Armyworm” is used because of their habit to spread out in a line across a lawn or pasture, and slowly “marching” forward, meanwhile consuming the foliage they encounter.

== Description ==
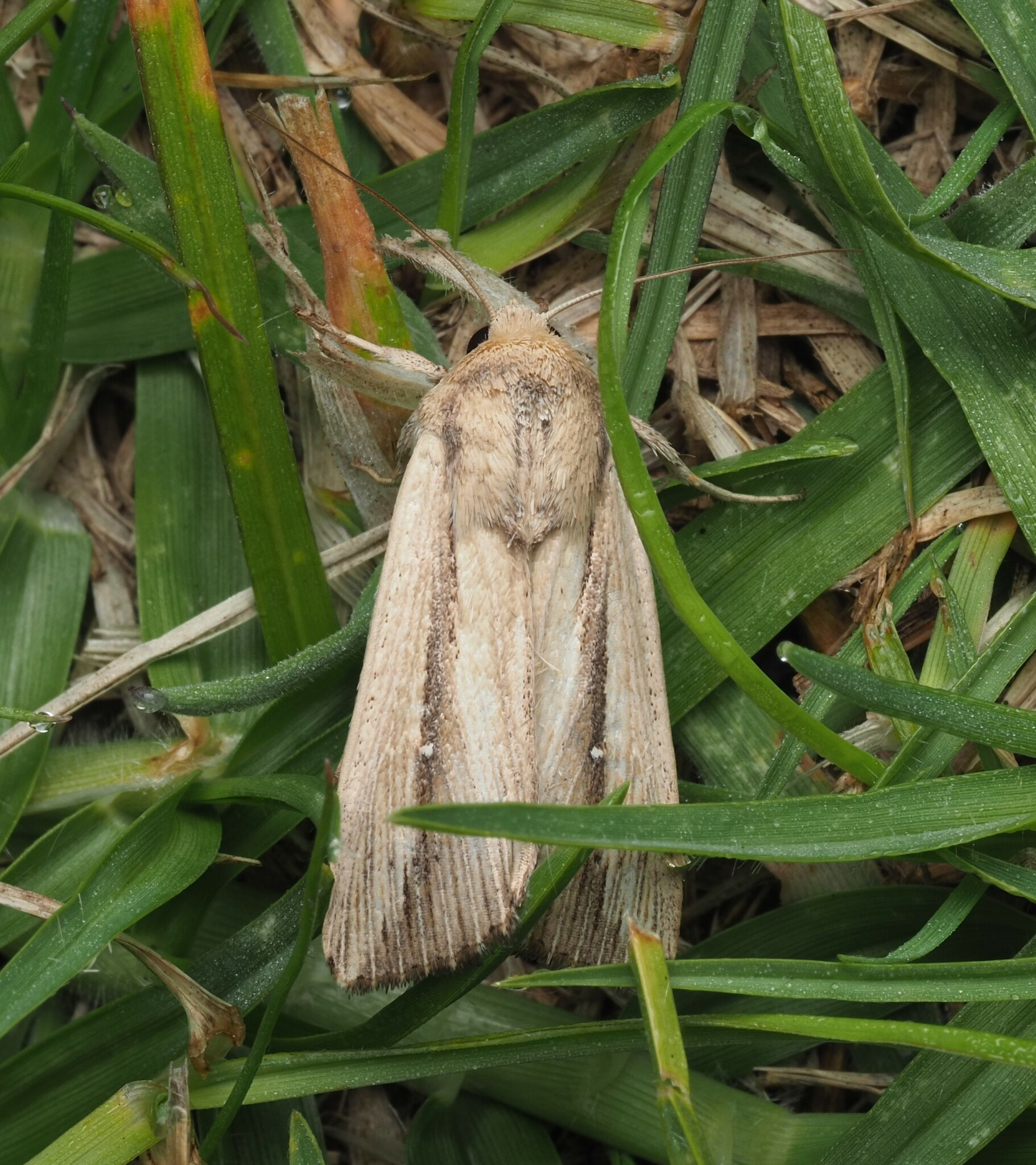
Observation of L. stenographa

Lower described the species as follows:

♂♀. 38-40 mm. Head, palpi, thorax, legs and abdomen ochreous-fuscous, face with two narrow interrupted fuscous bars, thorax with two transverse anterior bands, anterior one very tine, posterior very broad, coxae densely hairy, posterior pair mixed with fuscous. Antennae fuscous-ochreous. Abdomen beneath more ochreous. Forewings elongate, moderately dilated, costa nearly straight, hindmargin gently rounded; ochreous, strongly infuscated throughout with fine fuscous and dark fuscous lines, becoming edged by an equal width of groundcolour on hind-marginal area, which gives the appearance of alternating ochreous and fuscous lines; lower edge of cell becoming very strongly infuscated, sometimes more or less continued as a thick streak to apex; a fine whitish-ochreous spot at end of cell; an outwardly curved row of fine black dots from 5/6 of costa to inner margin before anal angle : cilia ochreous-fuscous, with a hindmarginal row of black intervenal spots, more pronounced on underside. Hindwings with hindmargin very slightly waved; iridescent-whitish; a fine fuscous hindmarginal line; cilia whitish.

== Distribution ==
This species can be found in most parts of Australia including South Australia, Western Australia, New South Wales, Queensland, Tasmania and Norfolk Island. It is also found in New Zealand and the Cook Islands.

== Host species ==
The larvae feed on agricultural plants, such as Saccharum officinarum and Poaceae species and are thus considered a pest.

== Predators and threats ==
In New Zealand the invasive wasps Polistes dominula and Polistes chinensis have been shown to predate L. stenographa.
