= Leucania venalba =

Scientific classification
- Kingdom: Animalia
- Phylum: Arthropoda
- Class: Insecta
- Order: Lepidoptera
- Superfamily: Noctuoidea
- Family: Noctuidae
- Genus: Leucania
- Species: L. venalba

Binomial name
- Leucania venalba (Moore, 1867)

Synonyms
- Cirphis philippensis C. Swinhoe, 1917; Mythimna venalba Moore, 1867; Leucania venalba Moore; Calora, 1966

Species of moth

Leucania venalba is a moth of the family Noctuidae first described by Frederic Moore in 1867. It is found in Indo-Australian tropics of India, Sri Lanka, to Fiji and New Caledonia.

Forewings brown without a distinct pale spot at the discal end found on other related species. Half a dark-edged white line runs down the middle of each forewing. Hindwings off white with some darkening basally. The caterpillar is a semi looper. Early instars are grey, which become greener with each developing instar while eating. Head golden brown. A broad, double, purple-brown dorsal line is visible. Late instars brownish with minute dark markings. Underparts pale olive brown. Larval food plants are several grasses and Oryza species.
