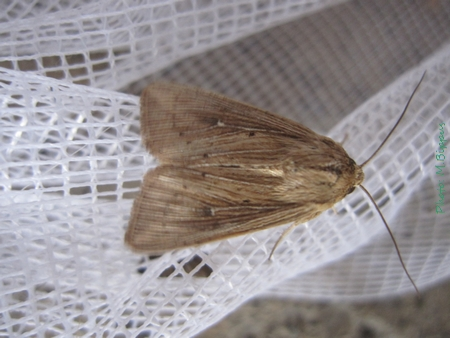

Scientific classification
- Kingdom: Animalia
- Phylum: Arthropoda
- Class: Insecta
- Order: Lepidoptera
- Superfamily: Noctuoidea
- Family: Noctuidae
- Genus: Leucania
- Species: L. insulicola

Binomial name
- Leucania insulicola (Guenée, 1852)

Synonyms
- Cirphis leucosticha Hampson, 1905

= Leucania insulicola =

Species of moth

Leucania insulicola is a species of moth of the family Noctuidae. It is found in most parts of central, western and southern Africa and on the islands of the Indian Ocean.

It has a length of approx. 18–20 mm = wingspan around 36-40mm.
