= Leucania joannisi =

Scientific classification
- Domain: Eukaryota
- Kingdom: Animalia
- Phylum: Arthropoda
- Class: Insecta
- Order: Lepidoptera
- Superfamily: Noctuoidea
- Family: Noctuidae
- Genus: Leucania
- Species: L. joannisi

Binomial name
- Leucania joannisi Boursin & Rungs, 1952

Synonyms
- Leucania joannisi arbia Boursin & Rungs, 1952; Mythimna joannisi

Species of moth

Leucania joannisi is a species of moth of the family Noctuidae. It is found in tropical and subtropical Africa, Morocco, Portugal, Spain, southern Italy, Greece, Israel and Saudi Arabia.

Adults are on wing from April to October. There are two generations per year.
