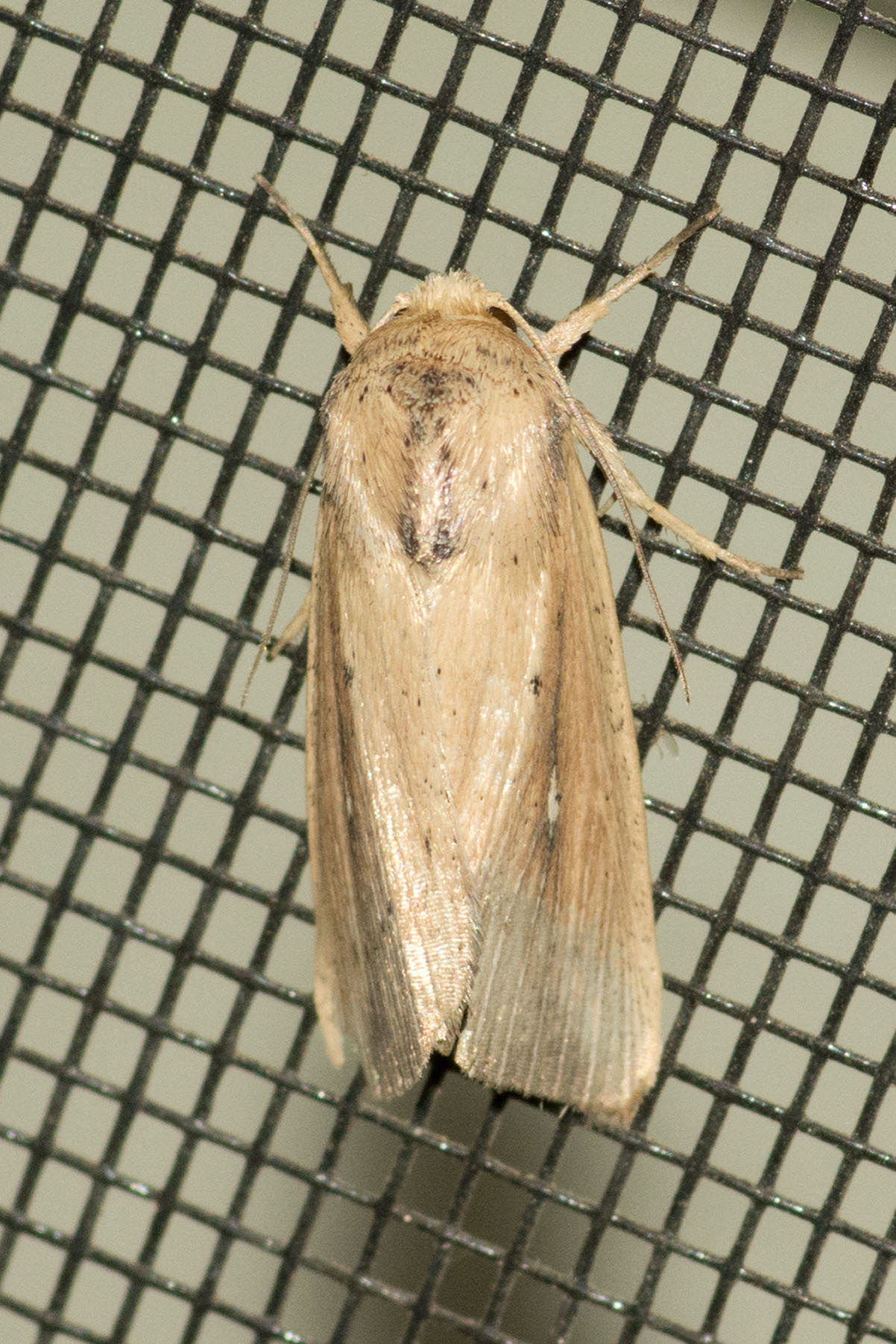

Scientific classification
- Kingdom: Animalia
- Phylum: Arthropoda
- Clade: Pancrustacea
- Class: Insecta
- Order: Lepidoptera
- Superfamily: Noctuoidea
- Family: Noctuidae
- Tribe: Leucaniini
- Genus: Leucania
- Species: L. scirpicola

Binomial name
- Leucania scirpicola Guenée, 1852

= Leucania scirpicola =

Species of moth

Leucania scirpicola, the scirpus wainscot, is a species of cutworm or dart moth in the family Noctuidae. It is found in North America.

The MONA or Hodges number for Leucania scirpicola is 10455.
