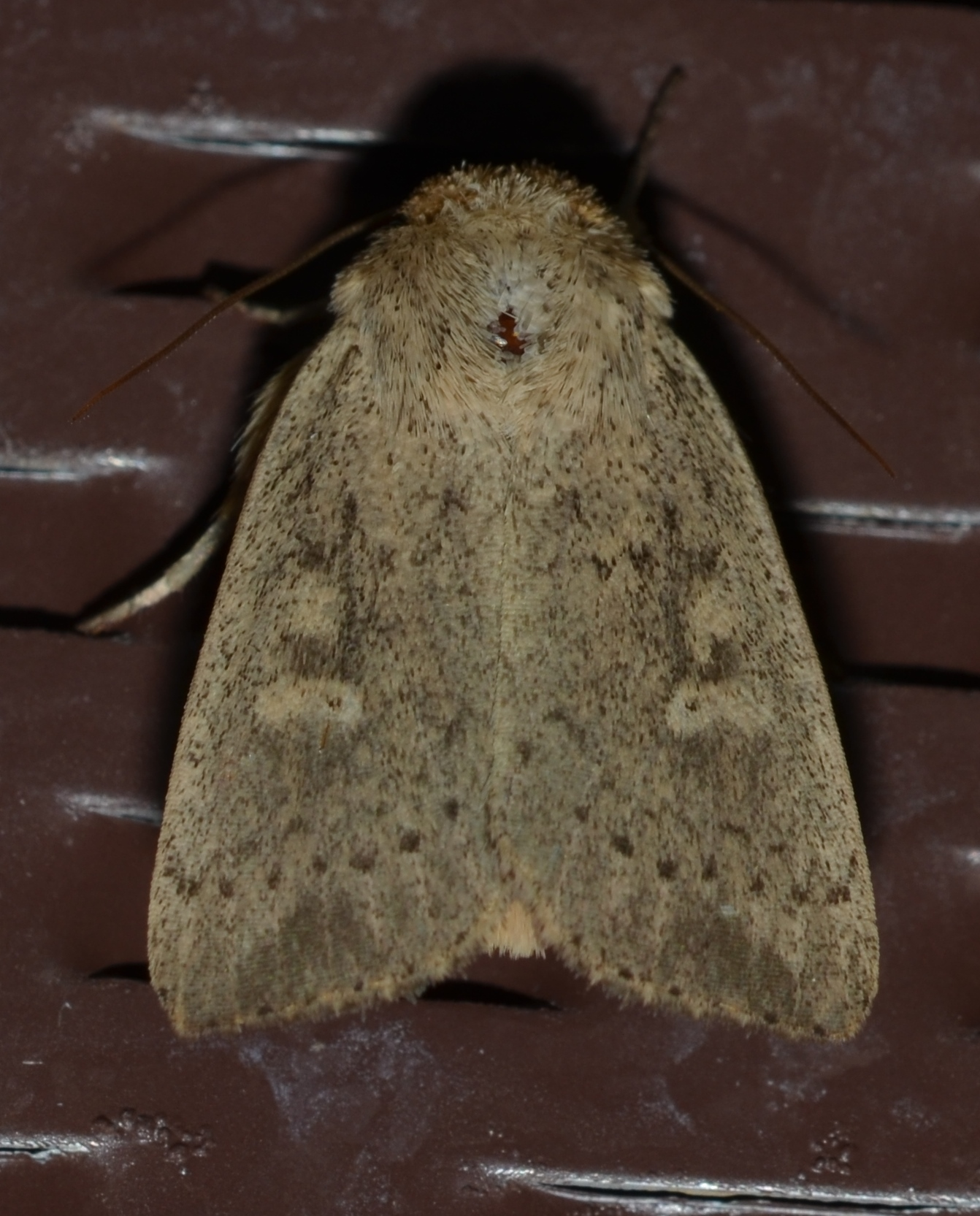

Scientific classification
- Kingdom: Animalia
- Phylum: Arthropoda
- Clade: Pancrustacea
- Class: Insecta
- Order: Lepidoptera
- Superfamily: Noctuoidea
- Family: Noctuidae
- Tribe: Leucaniini
- Genus: Leucania
- Species: L. inermis

Binomial name
- Leucania inermis (Forbes, 1936)

= Leucania inermis =

Species of moth

Leucania inermis, the unarmed wainscot, is a species of cutworm or dart moth in the family Noctuidae. It is found in North America.

The MONA or Hodges number for Leucania inermis is 10459.
