= Leucania herrichii =

Scientific classification
- Kingdom: Animalia
- Phylum: Arthropoda
- Class: Insecta
- Order: Lepidoptera
- Superfamily: Noctuoidea
- Family: Noctuidae
- Genus: Leucania
- Species: L. herrichii

Binomial name
- Leucania herrichii (Herrich-Schäffer, 1849)

Synonyms
- Mythimna herrichii Herrich-Schäffer, 1849

Species of moth

Leucania herrichii is a species of moth in the family Noctuidae. It was described by German entomologist Gottlieb August Wilhelm Herrich-Schäffer in 1849 as Mythimna herrichii. It can be found in Bulgaria, Croatia, Cyprus, Egypt (Sinai), Greece, Iran, Israel, Italy (Sicily), Jordan, Lebanon, Palestine, Syria, Turkey, and Turkmenistan. Adults have a wingspan of approximately 30–36 mm (1.2–1.4 in), and the larvae likely feed on grasses.
