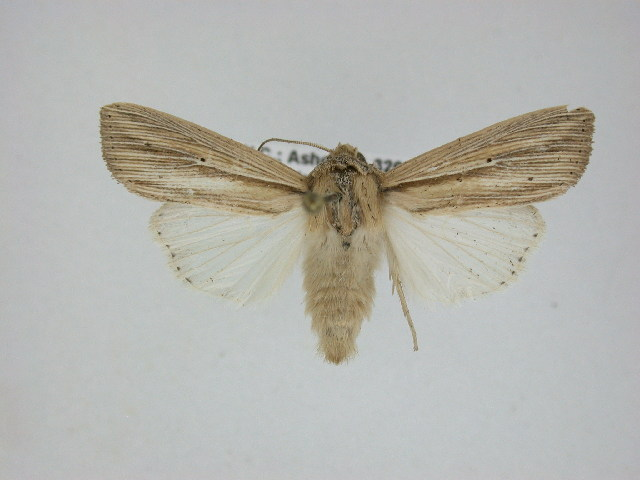

Scientific classification
- Kingdom: Animalia
- Phylum: Arthropoda
- Class: Insecta
- Order: Lepidoptera
- Superfamily: Noctuoidea
- Family: Noctuidae
- Genus: Leucania
- Species: L. lapidaria

Binomial name
- Leucania lapidaria (Grote, 1876)

= Leucania lapidaria =

Species of moth

Leucania lapidaria is a species of cutworm or dart moth in the family Noctuidae. It is found in North America.

The MONA or Hodges number for Leucania lapidaria is 10446.1.
