= Leucania roseivena =

Scientific classification
- Domain: Eukaryota
- Kingdom: Animalia
- Phylum: Arthropoda
- Class: Insecta
- Order: Lepidoptera
- Superfamily: Noctuoidea
- Family: Noctuidae
- Genus: Leucania
- Species: L. roseivena

Binomial name
- Leucania roseivena (Draudt, 1924)

Synonyms
- Neleucania roseivena Draudt, 1924

Species of moth

Leucania roseivena is a species of moth of the family Noctuidae. It is found in South America, including Colombia.
