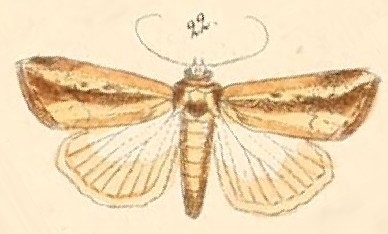

Scientific classification
- Domain: Eukaryota
- Kingdom: Animalia
- Phylum: Arthropoda
- Class: Insecta
- Order: Lepidoptera
- Superfamily: Noctuoidea
- Family: Noctuidae
- Genus: Leucania
- Species: L. tacuna

Binomial name
- Leucania tacuna Felder & Rogenhofer, 1874

Synonyms
- Leucania substituta Wallengren, 1875

= Leucania tacuna =

Species of moth

Leucania tacuna is a species of moth of the family Noctuidae. It is found in Congo, Uganda, Kenya and South Africa.
