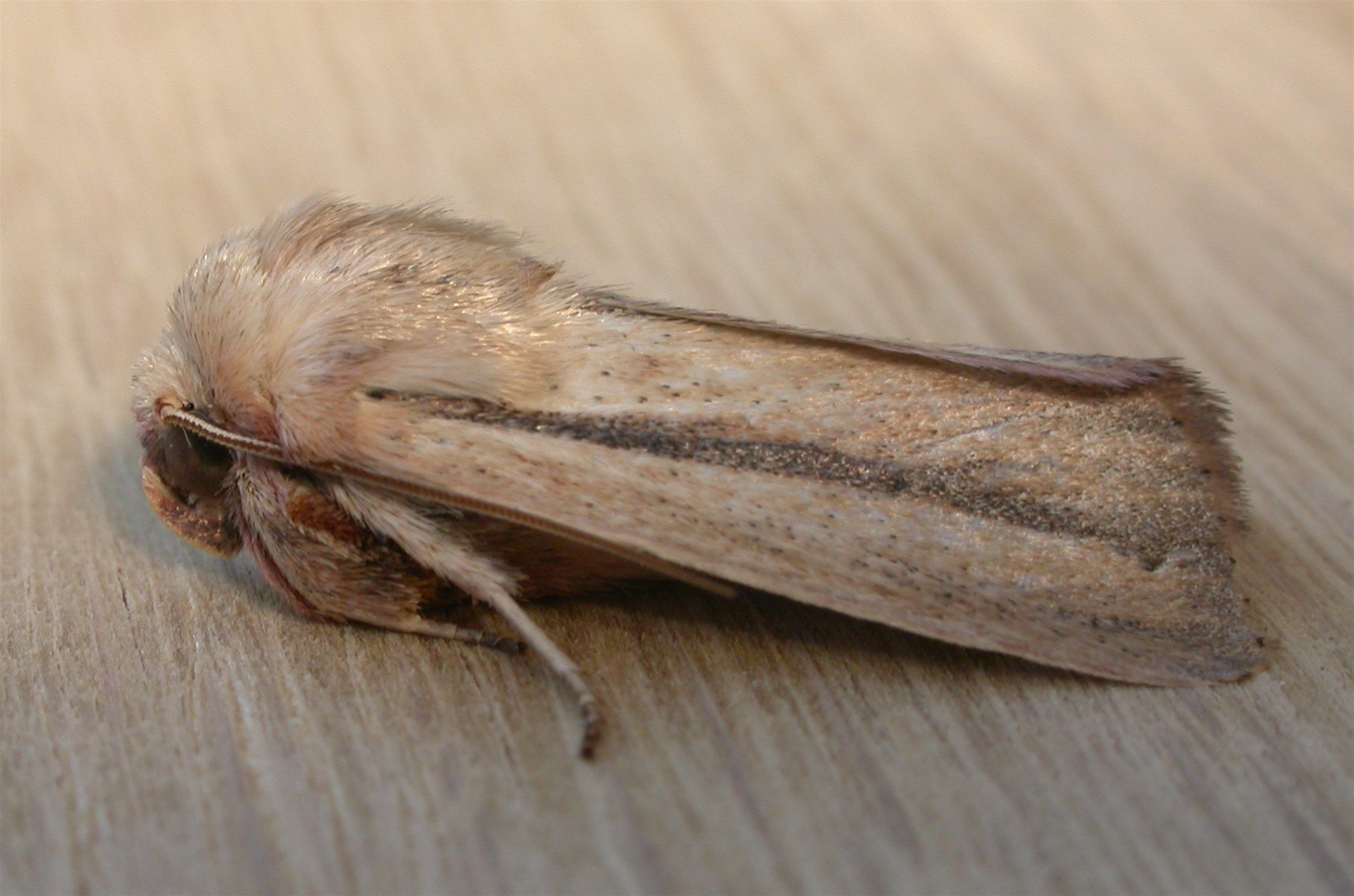

Scientific classification
- Domain: Eukaryota
- Kingdom: Animalia
- Phylum: Arthropoda
- Class: Insecta
- Order: Lepidoptera
- Superfamily: Noctuoidea
- Family: Noctuidae
- Genus: Leucania
- Species: L. diatrecta

Binomial name
- Leucania diatrecta Butler, 1886

= Leucania diatrecta =

Species of moth

Leucania diatrecta is a moth of the family Noctuidae. It is found in New South Wales.

The wingspan is about 30 mm.
