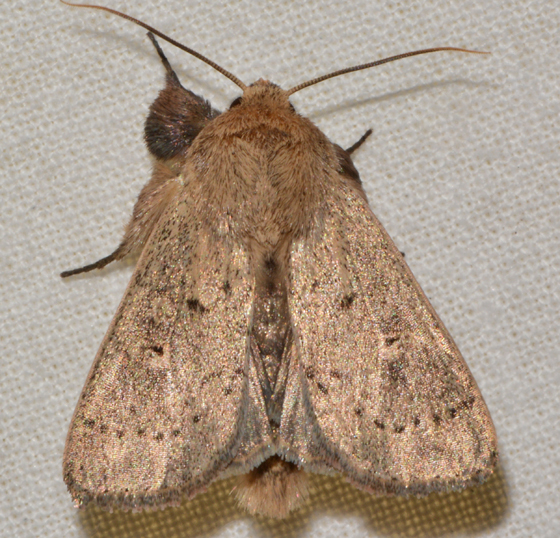

Scientific classification
- Kingdom: Animalia
- Phylum: Arthropoda
- Clade: Pancrustacea
- Class: Insecta
- Order: Lepidoptera
- Superfamily: Noctuoidea
- Family: Noctuidae
- Tribe: Leucaniini
- Genus: Leucania
- Species: L. pseudargyria

Binomial name
- Leucania pseudargyria Guenée, 1852

= Leucania pseudargyria =

Species of moth

Leucania pseudargyria, the false wainscot, is a species of cutworm or dart moth in the family Noctuidae. It is found in North America.

The MONA or Hodges number for Leucania pseudargyria is 10462.
