= Leucania zeae =

Scientific classification
- Kingdom: Animalia
- Phylum: Arthropoda
- Class: Insecta
- Order: Lepidoptera
- Superfamily: Noctuoidea
- Family: Noctuidae
- Genus: Leucania
- Species: L. zeae

Binomial name
- Leucania zeae (Duponchel, 1827)

Synonyms
- Noctua zeae Duponchel, 1827; Leucania indistincta Christoph, 1887; Leucania putrida Staudinger, 1889; Mythimna zeae

Species of moth

Leucania zeae is a species of moth of the family Noctuidae. It is found in North Africa, southern Europe, Turkey, Israel, Iran, Iraq, Saudi Arabia, central Asia and western China.

Adults are on wing from March to November. There are multiple generation per year.

Recorded food plants include Arundo donax, Zea mays and other Gramineae species including cereals in Europe. It is occasionally considered a minor pest.
