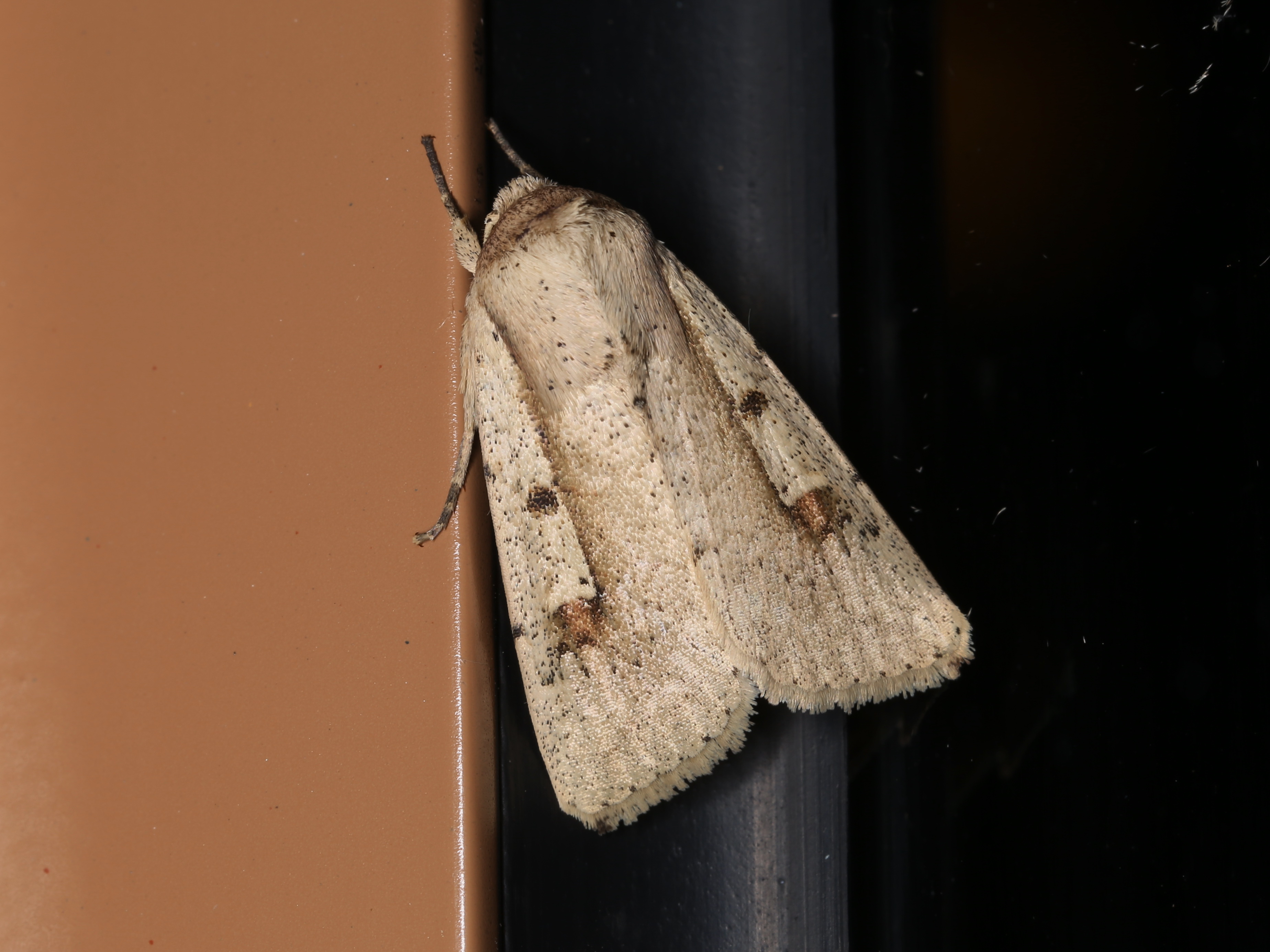

Scientific classification
- Kingdom: Animalia
- Phylum: Arthropoda
- Clade: Pancrustacea
- Class: Insecta
- Order: Lepidoptera
- Superfamily: Noctuoidea
- Family: Noctuidae
- Genus: Leucania
- Species: L. yu

Binomial name
- Leucania yu (Guenée, 1852)

Synonyms
- Mythimna (Acantholeucania) yu Guenée, 1852; Leucania exempta Walker, 1857; Leucania costalis Moore, 1877; Leucania yu Guenée; Calora, 1966

= Leucania yu =

Species of moth

Leucania yu is a species of moth in the family Noctuidae first described by Achille Guenée in 1852. It is found in Oriental tropics of India, Sri Lanka, the Andaman Islands, China, Indonesia, the Philippines, Taiwan east to Australia, Fiji and Tonga.

== Description ==
The adult wingspan is 3 cm. Forewings pale brown. Hindwings buff coloured. In the forewing, over the cell there is a characteristic narrow, triangular, pale wedge, which is dark brown distally. Antemedial and postmedial fasciae entire and crenulate. Strong brown spot associated with antemedial. Caterpillar in late instar olive brown. Strong subspiracular white stripe present. Faint longitudinal bands and small white spots also visible. Dorsal and subdorsal stripes visible in early instars, which become faint in final instars. Larval food plants include several grasses, Paspalum and Saccharum species.

== Gallery ==
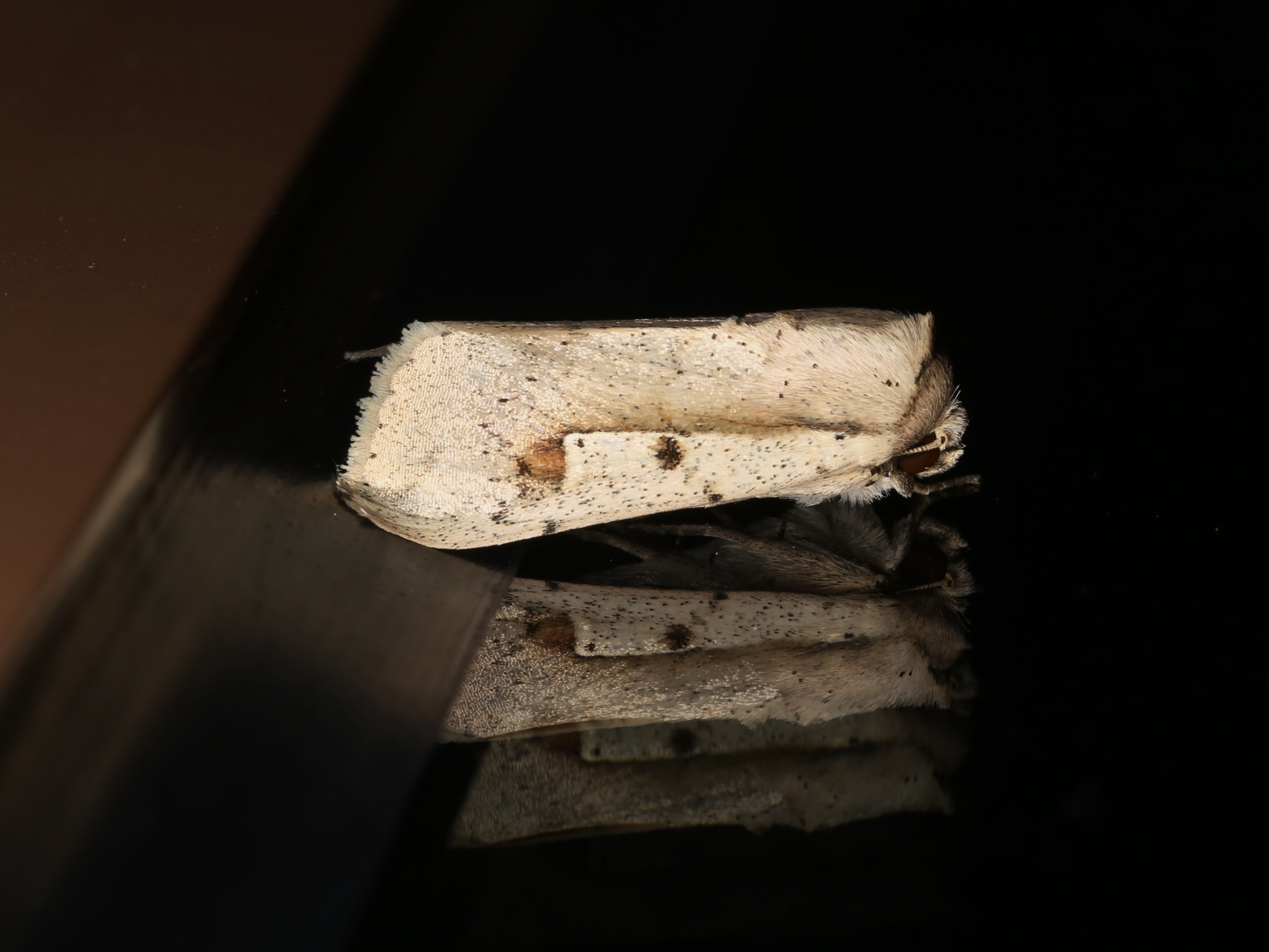

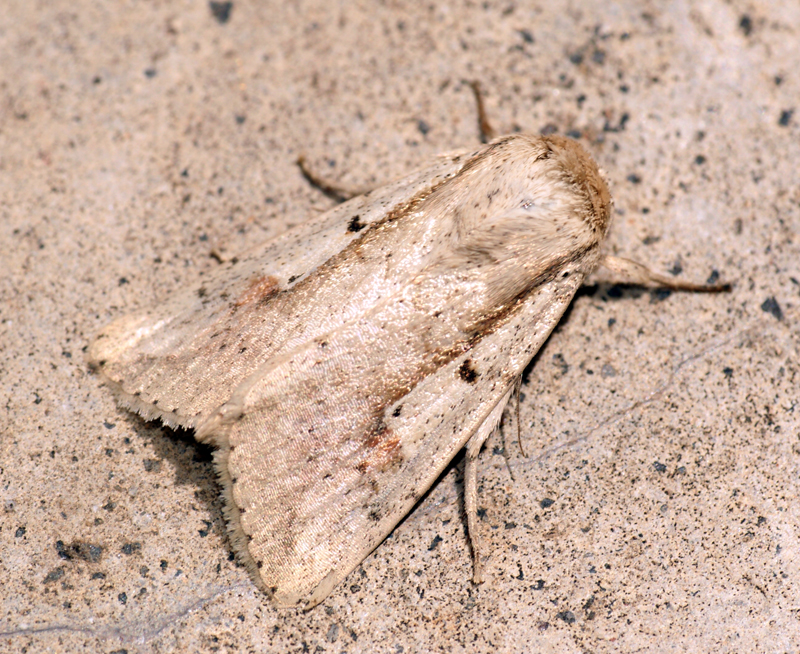

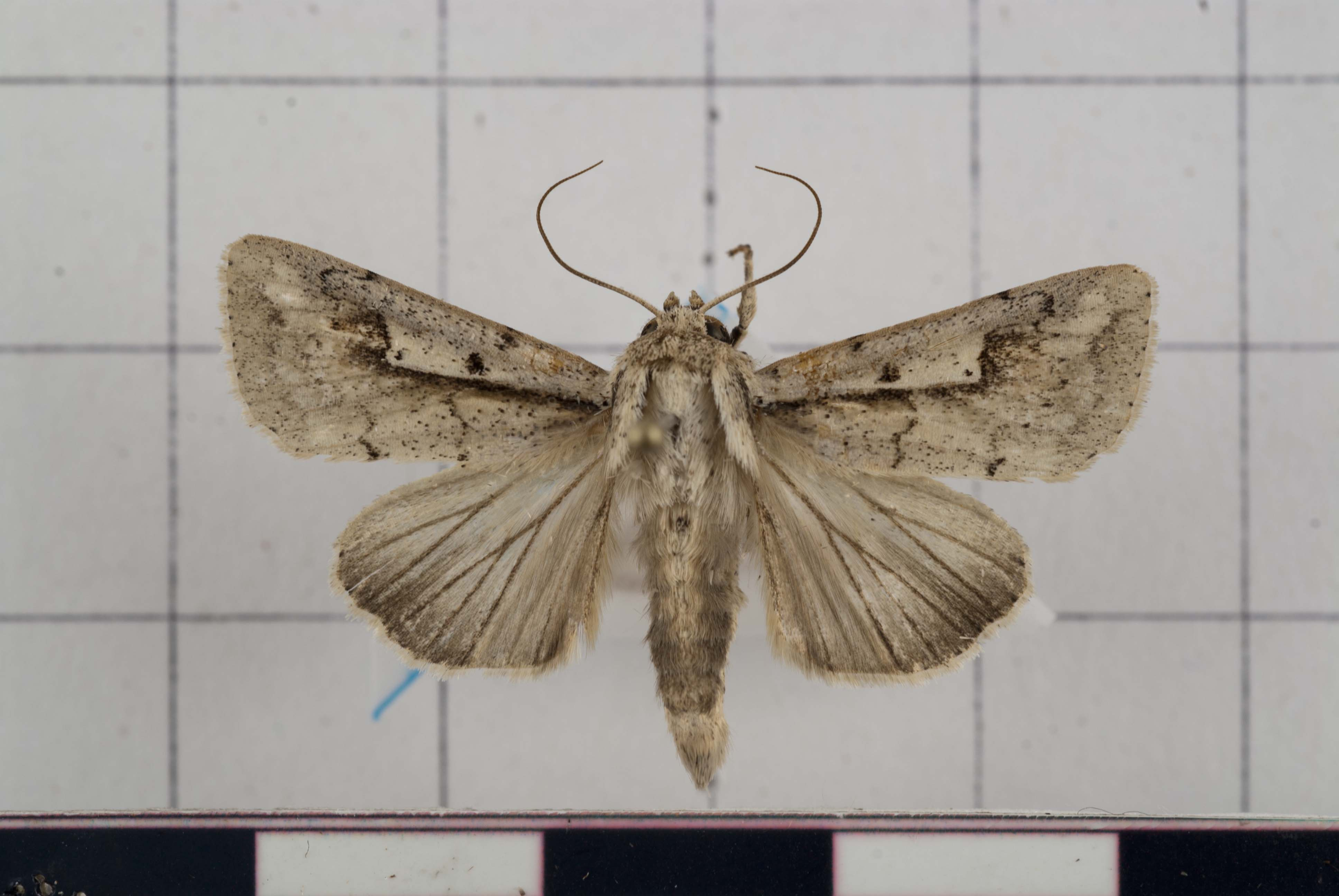

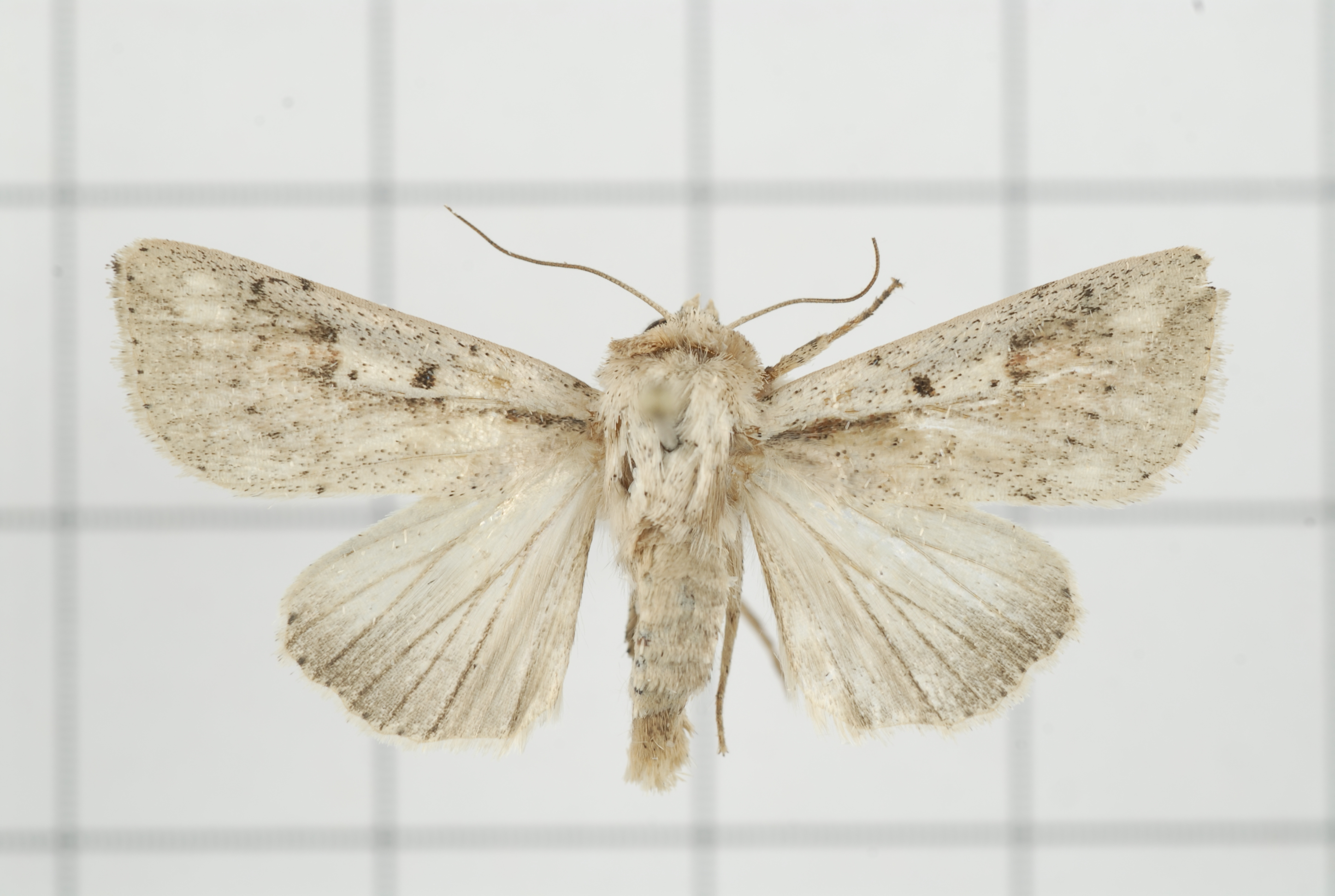
