= Leucania humidicola =

Scientific classification
- Kingdom: Animalia
- Phylum: Arthropoda
- Clade: Pancrustacea
- Class: Insecta
- Order: Lepidoptera
- Superfamily: Noctuoidea
- Family: Noctuidae
- Genus: Leucania
- Species: L. humidicola

Binomial name
- Leucania humidicola Guenée, 1852

Synonyms
- Leucania solita Walker, 1856; Leucania extenuata Guenée, 1852; Leucania tayaudi Guenée, 1852

Species of moth

Leucania humidicola is a species of moth of the family Noctuidae. It is found from the Antilles to Brazil and probably the Galapagos.

The larvae have been recorded on Sporoholus virginicus.
