= Wainscott =

Wainscott may refer to:

== Places ==
- Wainscott, Kent, England
- Wainscott, New York, US

== People with the surname ==
- G. L. Wainscott, the creator of Ale-8-One
- Tina Wainscott, American author

== See also ==
- Wainscot (disambiguation)
