= Leucania palaestinae =

Scientific classification
- Domain: Eukaryota
- Kingdom: Animalia
- Phylum: Arthropoda
- Class: Insecta
- Order: Lepidoptera
- Superfamily: Noctuoidea
- Family: Noctuidae
- Genus: Leucania
- Species: L. palaestinae

Binomial name
- Leucania palaestinae Staudinger, 1897

Synonyms
- Leucania putrida var. palaestinae Staudinger, 1897; Leucania languida Staudinger, 1897; Leucania jordana Bartel, 1904; Cirphis crenulata Hampson, 1905; Mythimna palaestinae; Leucania crenulata

Species of moth

Leucania palaestinae is a species of moth of the family Noctuidae. It is found from Algeria to Egypt, Sicily, Cyprus, Greece, Turkey, Israel, Syria, Jordan, the Sinai in Egypt, Iran, Iraq and Turkmenistan.

Adults are on wing from April to June and from October to December. There are two generation per year.

The larvae feed on Arundo phraguntes and Gramineae species in Europe.
