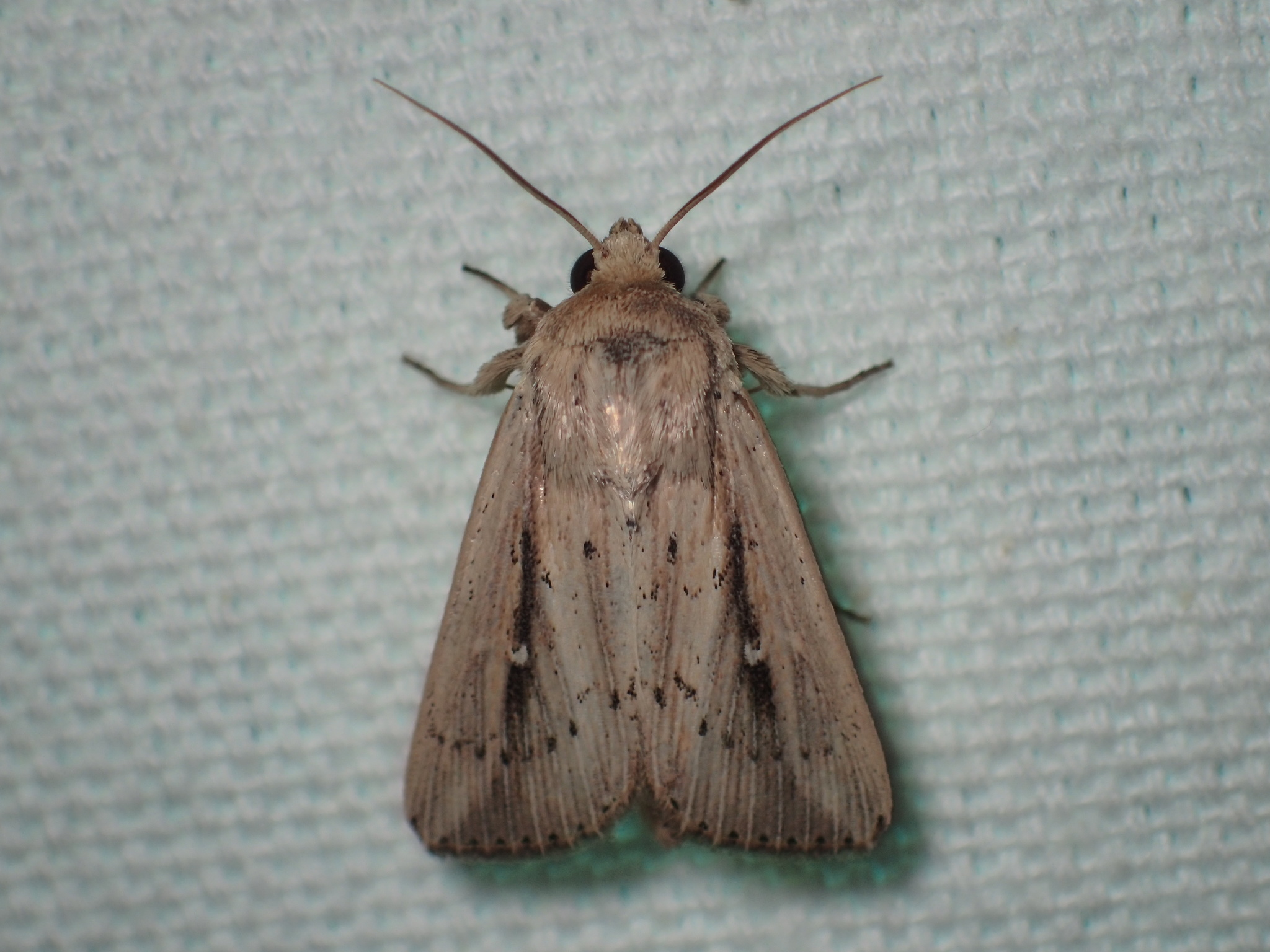

Scientific classification
- Domain: Eukaryota
- Kingdom: Animalia
- Phylum: Arthropoda
- Class: Insecta
- Order: Lepidoptera
- Superfamily: Noctuoidea
- Family: Noctuidae
- Genus: Leucania
- Species: L. incognita

Binomial name
- Leucania incognita (Barnes & McDunnough, 1918)

= Leucania incognita =

Species of moth

Leucania incognita is a species of cutworm or dart moth in the family Noctuidae first described by William Barnes and James Halliday McDunnough in 1918. It is found in North America.

The MONA or Hodges number for Leucania incognita is 10450.
