= Leucania roseilinea =

Scientific classification
- Kingdom: Animalia
- Phylum: Arthropoda
- Class: Insecta
- Order: Lepidoptera
- Superfamily: Noctuoidea
- Family: Noctuidae
- Genus: Leucania
- Species: L. roseilinea

Binomial name
- Leucania roseilinea (Walker, 1862)

Synonyms
- Mythimna roseilinea Walker, 1862; Leucania aspersa Snellen, 1880; Leucania homopterana Swinhoe, 1890; Leucania compta Moore, 1881; Leucania canaraica Moore, 1881; Leucania stramen Hampson, 1891

Species of moth

Leucania roseilinea, the grain army worm, is a moth of the family Noctuidae. The species was first described by Francis Walker in 1862. It is found in Sri Lanka, Myanmar, Sundaland, the Philippines to New Guinea.

Forewings brownish with a pale spot at the discal end. Brown mark on forewing below the postmedial costa. Indistinct dark brown marks on the veins on hindwing margin. Larval host plant is Oryza.
