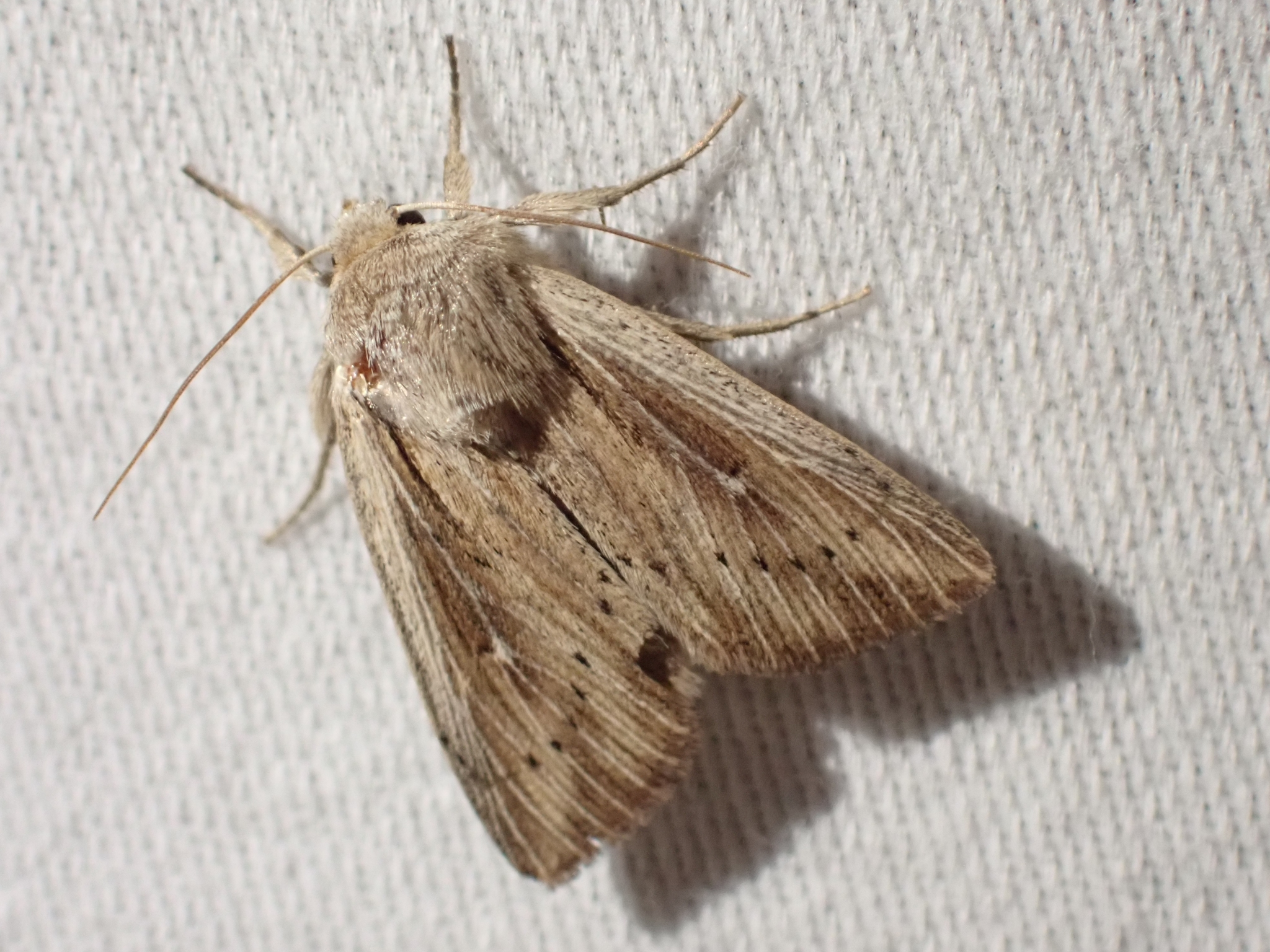

Scientific classification
- Kingdom: Animalia
- Phylum: Arthropoda
- Class: Insecta
- Order: Lepidoptera
- Superfamily: Noctuoidea
- Family: Noctuidae
- Tribe: Leucaniini
- Genus: Leucania
- Species: L. insueta

Binomial name
- Leucania insueta Guenée, 1852

= Leucania insueta =

Species of moth

Leucania insueta, the heterodox wainscot moth, is a species of cutworm or dart moth in the family Noctuidae. It is found in North America.
