= Leucania inconspicua =

Scientific classification
- Domain: Eukaryota
- Kingdom: Animalia
- Phylum: Arthropoda
- Class: Insecta
- Order: Lepidoptera
- Superfamily: Noctuoidea
- Family: Noctuidae
- Genus: Leucania
- Species: L. inconspicua

Binomial name
- Leucania inconspicua Herrich-Schäffer, 1868

Synonyms
- Cirphis hildrani Schaus, 1938; Cirphis ezrami Schaus, 1938

Species of moth

Leucania inconspicua is a moth of the family Noctuidae first described by Gottlieb August Wilhelm Herrich-Schäffer in 1868. It is found in Florida, Cuba, Puerto Rico, Jamaica, the Lesser Antilles and from Mexico to Brazil.
