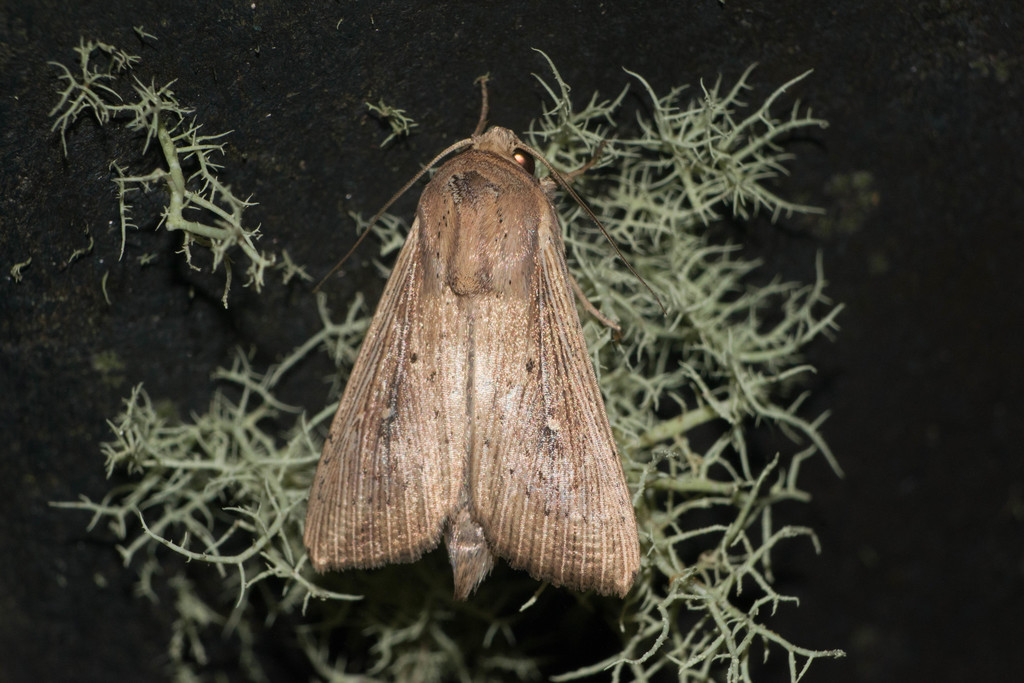

Scientific classification
- Kingdom: Animalia
- Phylum: Arthropoda
- Clade: Pancrustacea
- Class: Insecta
- Order: Lepidoptera
- Superfamily: Noctuoidea
- Family: Noctuidae
- Genus: Leucania
- Species: L. striata

Binomial name
- Leucania striata Leech, 1900

= Leucania striata =

Species of moth

Leucania striata is a moth of the family Noctuidae. It is native to Japan, where it is known from the central to the western areas of Honshu, extending through Shikoku and Kyushu south to the Ryukyu Islands (= Loochoo). It has also been recorded from Hawaii, where it was potentially introduced by humans.
