= Leucania secta =

Scientific classification
- Kingdom: Animalia
- Phylum: Arthropoda
- Clade: Pancrustacea
- Class: Insecta
- Order: Lepidoptera
- Superfamily: Noctuoidea
- Family: Noctuidae
- Genus: Leucania
- Species: L. secta

Binomial name
- Leucania secta Herrich-Schäffer, 1868

Species of moth

Leucania secta is a moth of the family Noctuidae first described by Gottlieb August Wilhelm Herrich-Schäffer in 1868. It is found on Cuba, Jamaica and the Bahamas.
