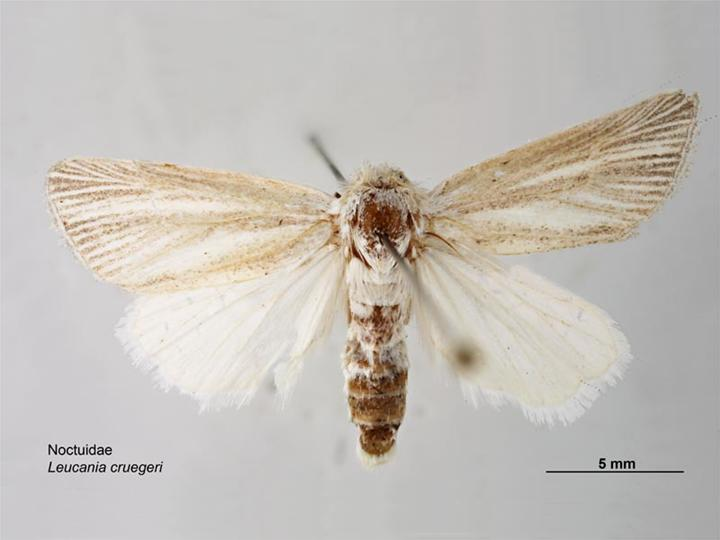
- Dorsal view
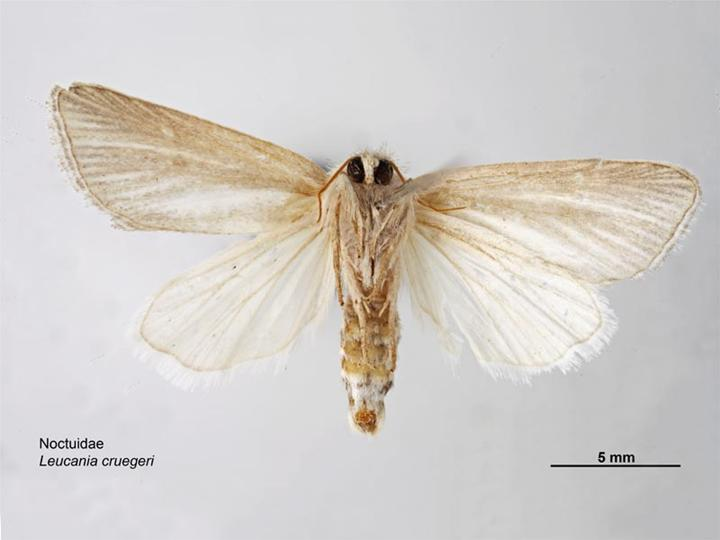
- Ventral view

Scientific classification
- Domain: Eukaryota
- Kingdom: Animalia
- Phylum: Arthropoda
- Class: Insecta
- Order: Lepidoptera
- Superfamily: Noctuoidea
- Family: Noctuidae
- Genus: Leucania
- Species: L. cruegeri

Binomial name
- Leucania cruegeri Butler, 1886

Synonyms
- Leucania praeclara Swinhoe, 1902; Borolia praeclara

= Leucania cruegeri =

Species of moth

Leucania cruegeri is a moth of the family Noctuidae. It is found in Western Australia.

Adults have brown streaky forewings and pale hindwings.
