= Leucania pilipalpis =

Scientific classification
- Kingdom: Animalia
- Phylum: Arthropoda
- Class: Insecta
- Order: Lepidoptera
- Superfamily: Noctuoidea
- Family: Noctuidae
- Genus: Leucania
- Species: L. pilipalpis

Binomial name
- Leucania pilipalpis (Grote, 1877)

Species of moth

Leucania pilipalpis is a species of cutworm or dart moth in the family Noctuidae.

The MONA or Hodges number for Leucania pilipalpis is 10463.
