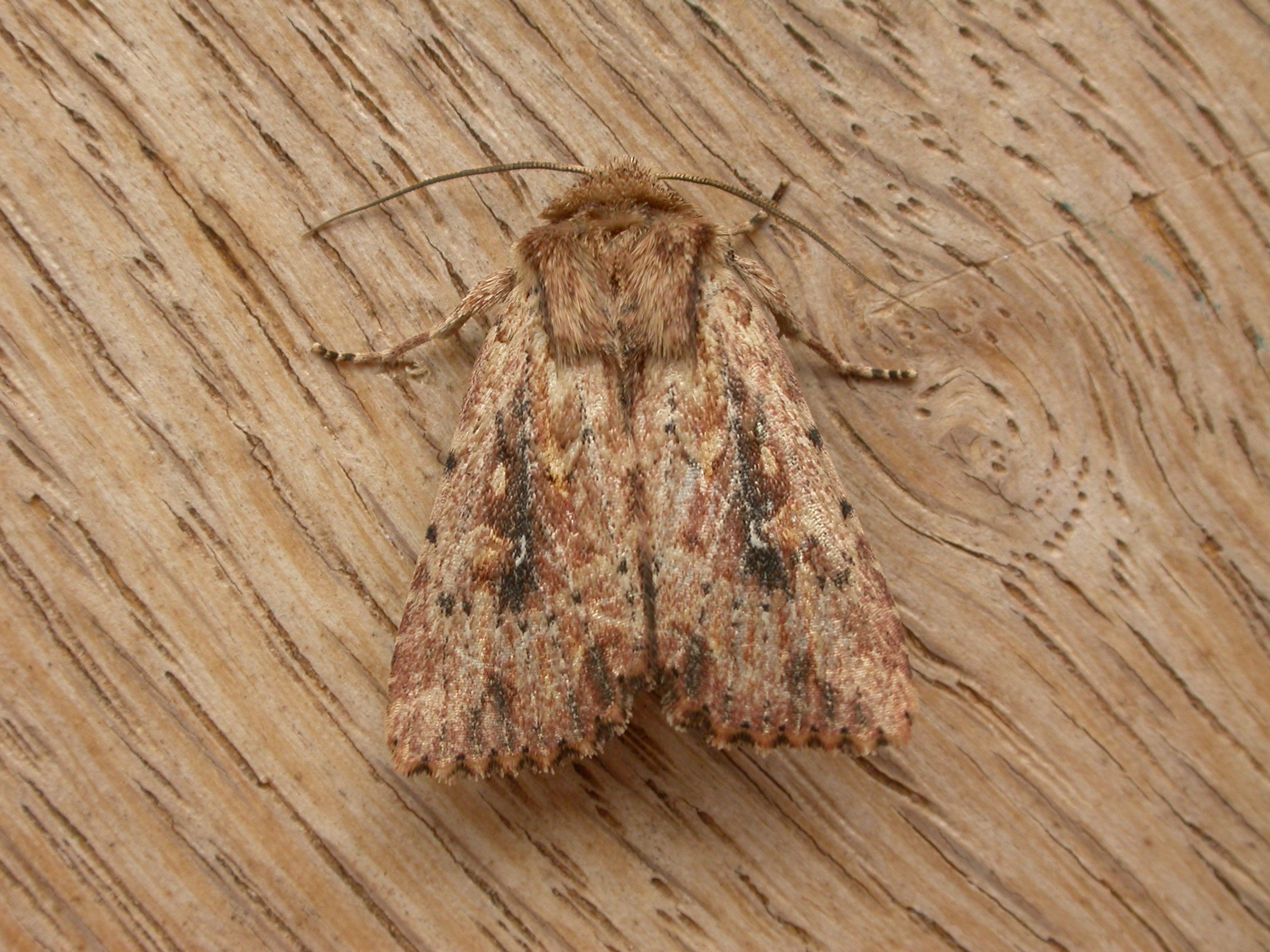

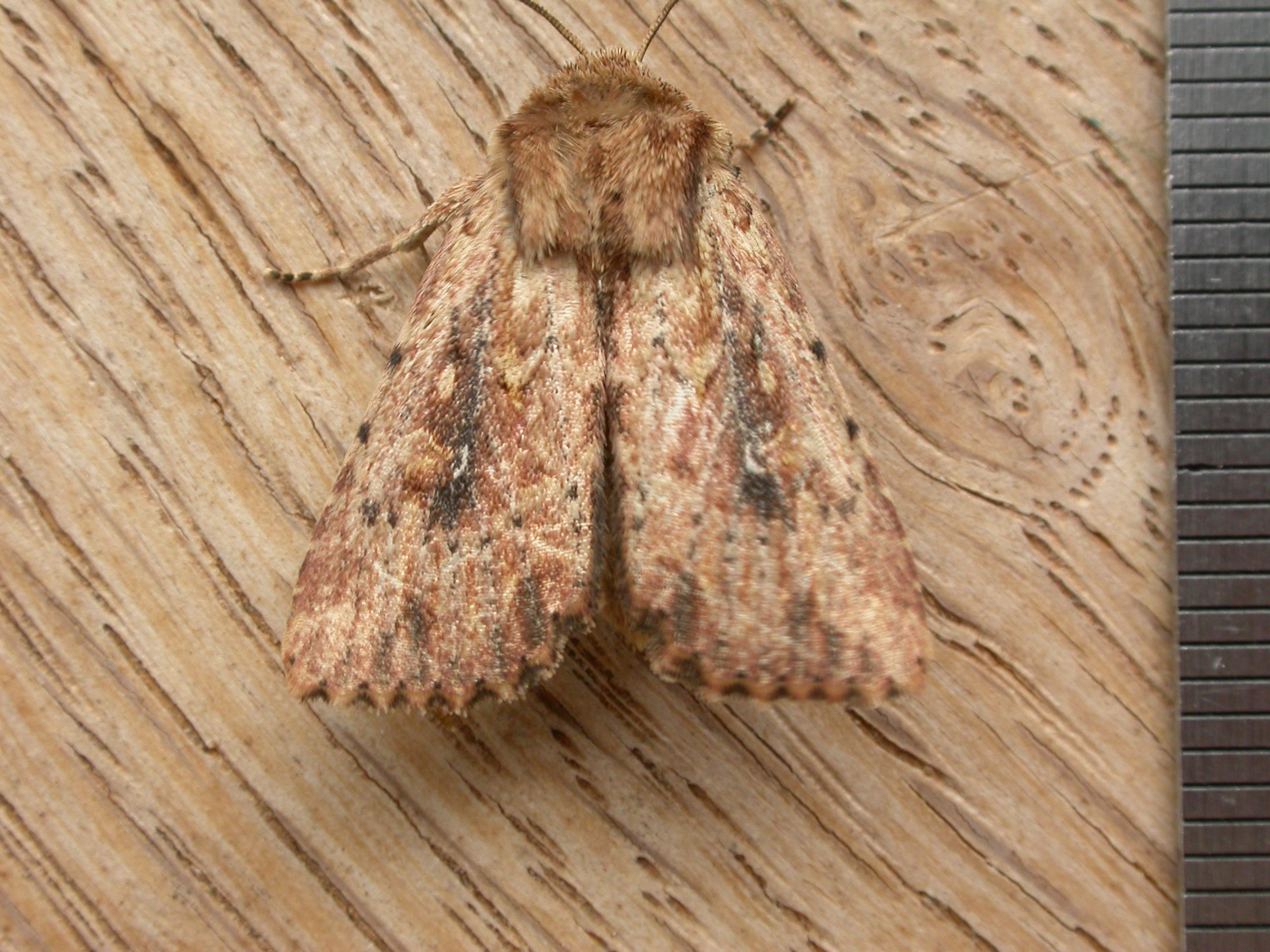

Scientific classification
- Domain: Eukaryota
- Kingdom: Animalia
- Phylum: Arthropoda
- Class: Insecta
- Order: Lepidoptera
- Superfamily: Noctuoidea
- Family: Noctuidae
- Genus: Leucania
- Species: L. obumbrata

Binomial name
- Leucania obumbrata T.P. Lucas, 1894

Synonyms
- Dasygaster nephelistis Hampson, 1905

= Leucania obumbrata =

Species of moth

Leucania obumbrata is a moth of the family Noctuidae. It is known from Australia.

The wingspan is about 50 mm.
