= Leucania oaxacana =

Scientific classification
- Domain: Eukaryota
- Kingdom: Animalia
- Phylum: Arthropoda
- Class: Insecta
- Order: Lepidoptera
- Superfamily: Noctuoidea
- Family: Noctuidae
- Genus: Leucania
- Species: L. oaxacana

Binomial name
- Leucania oaxacana Schaus, 1898

Species of moth

Leucania oaxacana is a species of cutworm or dart moth in the family Noctuidae, found in North America.

The MONA or Hodges number for Leucania oaxacana is 10451.
