= Leucania fiyu =

Scientific classification
- Domain: Eukaryota
- Kingdom: Animalia
- Phylum: Arthropoda
- Class: Insecta
- Order: Lepidoptera
- Superfamily: Noctuoidea
- Family: Noctuidae
- Genus: Leucania
- Species: L. fiyu

Binomial name
- Leucania fiyu Hreblay & Yoshimatsu, 1998

Species of moth

Leucania fiyu is a moth of the family Noctuidae. It was described by Márton Hreblay and Shin-Ichi Yoshimatsu in 1998. It is found on Fiji.
