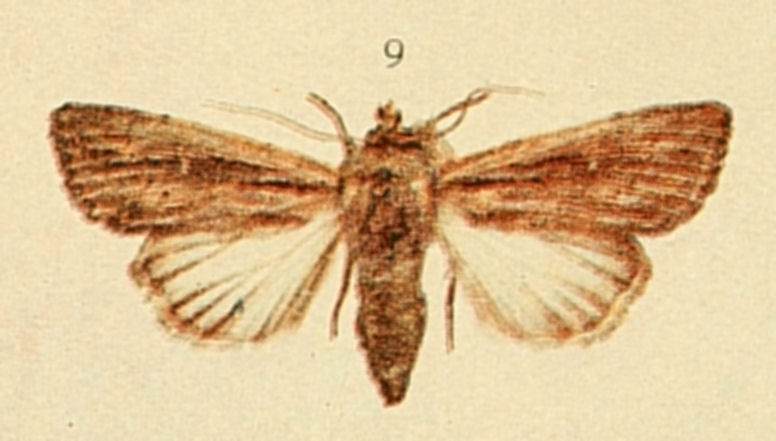

Scientific classification
- Domain: Eukaryota
- Kingdom: Animalia
- Phylum: Arthropoda
- Class: Insecta
- Order: Lepidoptera
- Superfamily: Noctuoidea
- Family: Noctuidae
- Genus: Leucania
- Species: L. putrescens

Binomial name
- Leucania putrescens (Hübner, 1824)

Synonyms
- Noctua putrescens Hübner, [1824]; Noctua boisduvalii Duponchel, 1827; Mythimna putrescens

= Leucania putrescens =

Species of moth

The Devonshire wainscot (Leucania putrescens) is a species of moth of the family Noctuidae. It is found in southern Europe, North Africa, Turkey, Israel, Lebanon.

== Technical description and variation ==
S. putrescens H. G. (= boisduvalii Dup.) (25 d). Distinguished from punctosa by the greyer tone and black irroration; a black streak from base below cell; the white spot at lower end of cell round, not elongated; terminal interspaces with black streaks. - Larva reddish ochreous; lines pale edged with dark; the subdorsal lines not interrupted. Subsp. canariensis Rbl., [ now full species Leucania canariensis Rebel, 1894] from the Canary islands, is smaller, the forewing darker, with a distinct black cellspot on underside.

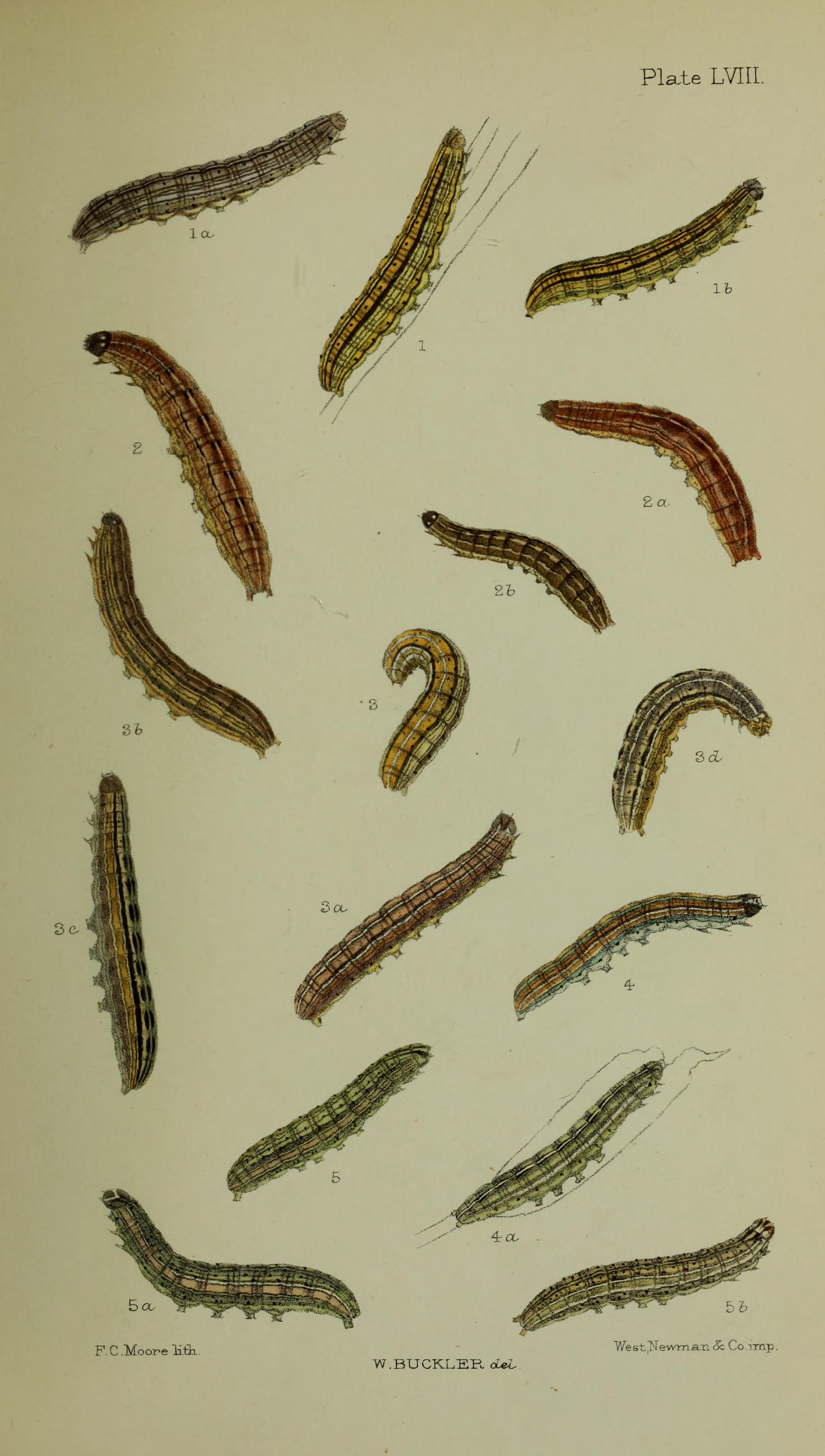
Figs 5, 5a, 5b

== Biology ==
Adults are on wing from October to November. There is one generation per year.

The larvae feed on various Gramineae species.

== Subspecies ==
- Leucania putrescens putrescens
- Leucania putrescens vallettai
