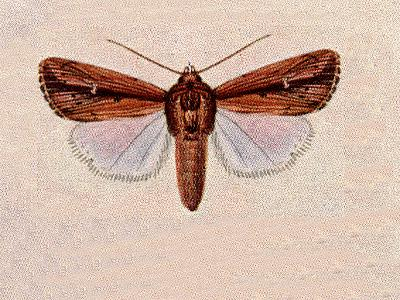

Scientific classification
- Kingdom: Animalia
- Phylum: Arthropoda
- Class: Insecta
- Order: Lepidoptera
- Superfamily: Noctuoidea
- Family: Noctuidae
- Genus: Leucania
- Species: L. cinereicollis

Binomial name
- Leucania cinereicollis Walker, 1858

= Leucania cinereicollis =

Species of moth

Orthodes jamaicensis is a moth of the family Noctuidae. It is found in Central America and South America and on the Antilles.
