= Leucania senescens =

Scientific classification
- Domain: Eukaryota
- Kingdom: Animalia
- Phylum: Arthropoda
- Class: Insecta
- Order: Lepidoptera
- Superfamily: Noctuoidea
- Family: Noctuidae
- Tribe: Leucaniini
- Genus: Leucania
- Species: L. senescens

Binomial name
- Leucania senescens Möschler, 1890

Species of moth

Leucania senescens is a species of cutworm or dart moth in the family Noctuidae. It is found in North America.

The MONA or Hodges number for Leucania senescens is 10455.1.
