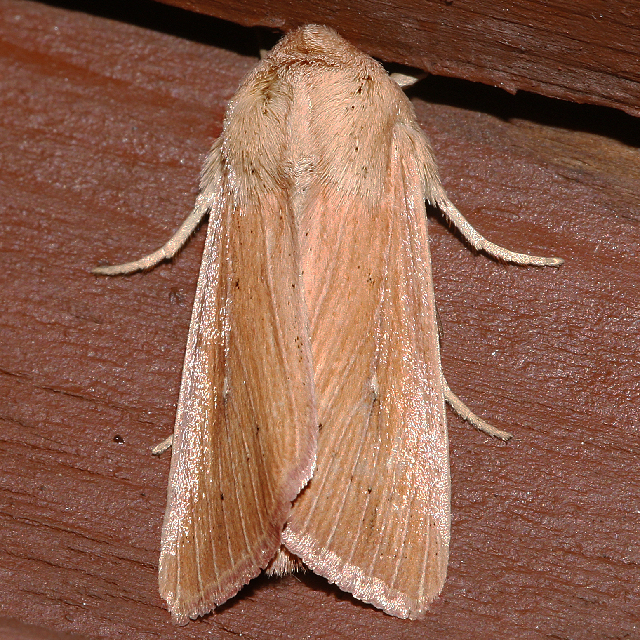

Scientific classification
- Kingdom: Animalia
- Phylum: Arthropoda
- Class: Insecta
- Order: Lepidoptera
- Superfamily: Noctuoidea
- Family: Noctuidae
- Genus: Leucania
- Species: L. farcta

Binomial name
- Leucania farcta (Grote, 1881)

= Leucania farcta =

Species of moth

Leucania farcta, the meadow wainscot moth, is a species of cutworm or dart moth in the family Noctuidae. It is found in North America.

The MONA or Hodges number for Leucania farcta is 10441.
