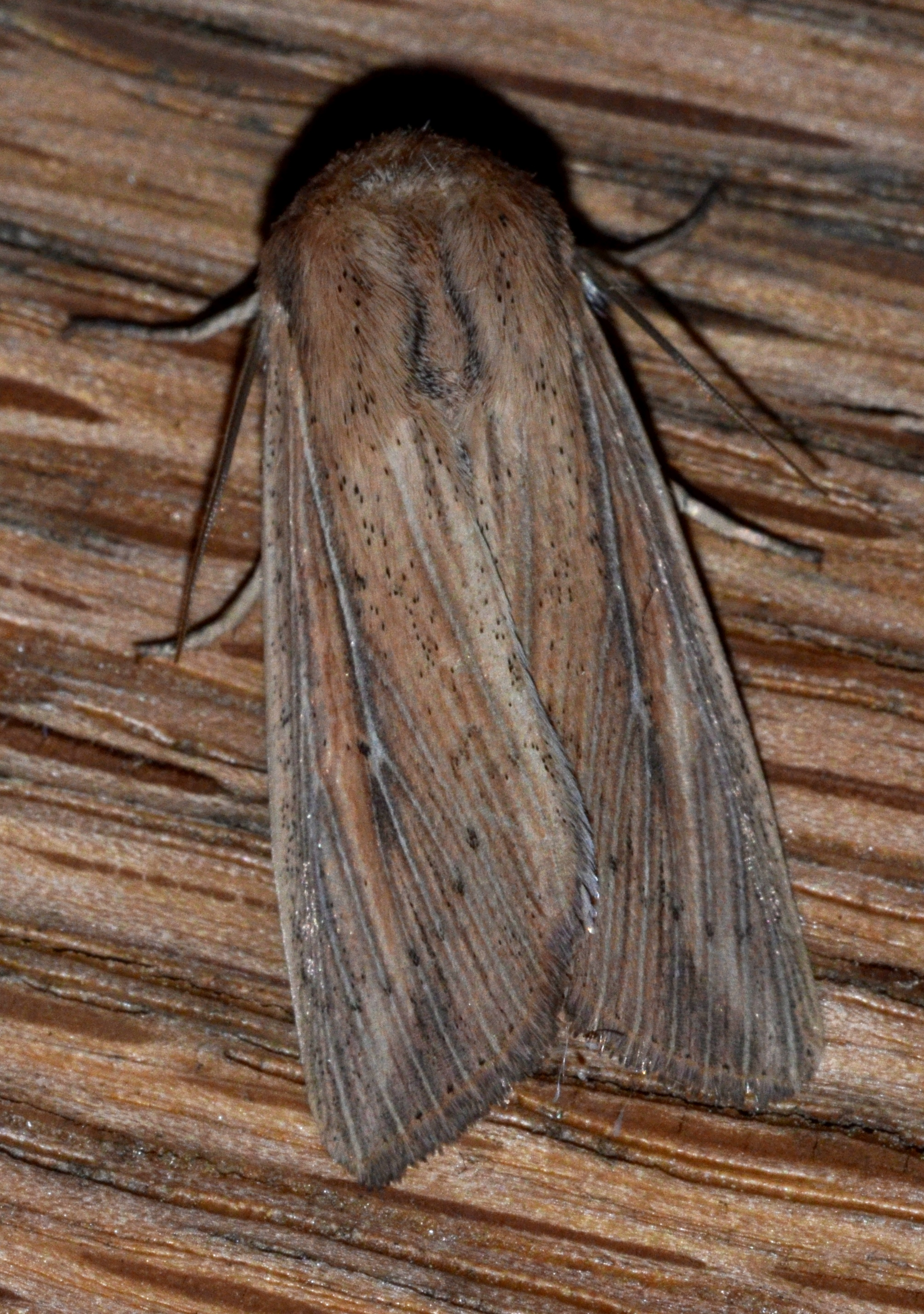

Scientific classification
- Domain: Eukaryota
- Kingdom: Animalia
- Phylum: Arthropoda
- Class: Insecta
- Order: Lepidoptera
- Superfamily: Noctuoidea
- Family: Noctuidae
- Genus: Leucania
- Species: L. linda

Binomial name
- Leucania linda Franclemont, 1952

= Leucania linda =

Species of moth

Orthodes linda, the linda wainscot moth, is a moth of the family Noctuidae. It is found in North America, where it has been recorded from Arkansas, Indiana, Kentucky, Maryland, Minnesota, Mississippi, New York, North Carolina, Ohio, Oklahoma, Ontario, South Carolina, Tennessee, West Virginia and Wisconsin.

The wingspan is about 34 mm. Adults are mainly on wing from May to October.
