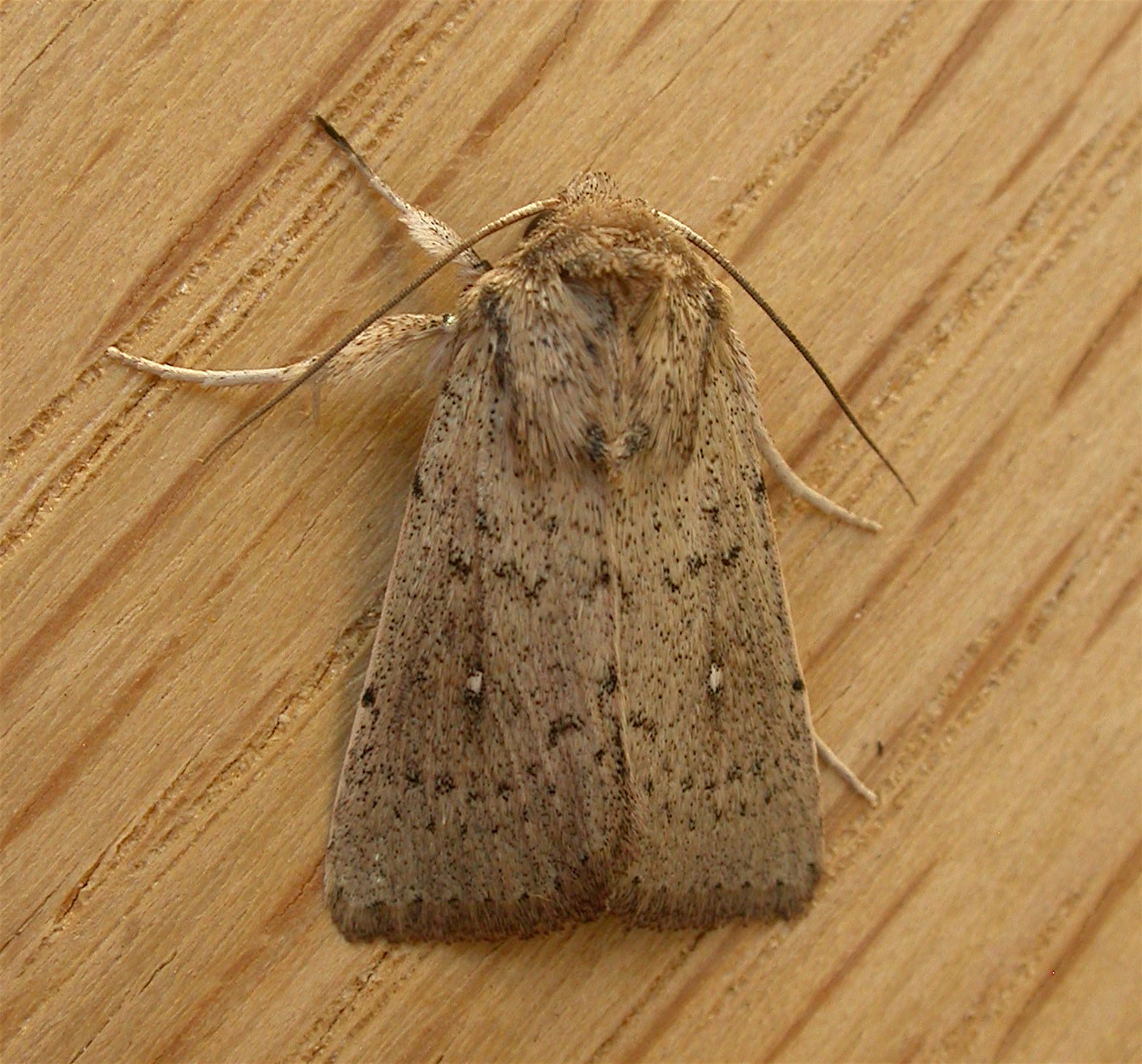

Scientific classification
- Kingdom: Animalia
- Phylum: Arthropoda
- Class: Insecta
- Order: Lepidoptera
- Superfamily: Noctuoidea
- Family: Noctuidae
- Genus: Leucania
- Species: L. uda

Binomial name
- Leucania uda Guenée, 1852

Synonyms
- Cirphis ciliata

= Leucania uda =

Species of moth

Leucania uda is a moth of the family Noctuidae. It is found in Australia. It is a brown moth and has scattered black dots all over itself. It is found in grassy area's and lives near Chadstone.

The wingspan is about 20 mm.
