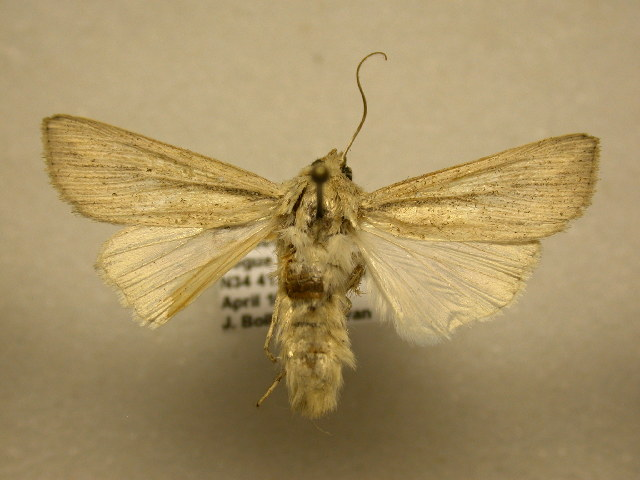

Scientific classification
- Kingdom: Animalia
- Phylum: Arthropoda
- Class: Insecta
- Order: Lepidoptera
- Superfamily: Noctuoidea
- Family: Noctuidae
- Genus: Leucania
- Species: L. phragmitidicola

Binomial name
- Leucania phragmitidicola Guenée, 1852

= Leucania phragmitidicola =

Phragmites wainscot

Species of moth

Leucania phragmitidicola (phragmites wainscot) is a species of moth of the family Noctuidae found in the eastern United States and Canada.

== Description ==
Adult forewings are tan with streaks of gray and brown, paler veins, and a black discal spot. The pale vein that extend from the forewing base to the discal spot is edged in brown.

== Range ==
The species' occurrence range extends from Oklahoma and Minnesota in the west to Florida and New Brunswick in the east. There are also scattered reports in the western United States.

== Life cycle ==
=== Adults ===
Adults have been reported from February to November, with most sightings from April to October.
