= Leucania subpunctata =

Scientific classification
- Domain: Eukaryota
- Kingdom: Animalia
- Phylum: Arthropoda
- Class: Insecta
- Order: Lepidoptera
- Superfamily: Noctuoidea
- Family: Noctuidae
- Tribe: Leucaniini
- Genus: Leucania
- Species: L. subpunctata

Binomial name
- Leucania subpunctata (Harvey, 1875)

Species of moth

Leucania subpunctata, known generally as the white-dotted wainscot or forage armyworm moth, is a species of cutworm or dart moth in the family Noctuidae. It is found in North America.

The MONA or Hodges number for Leucania subpunctata is 10453.1.
