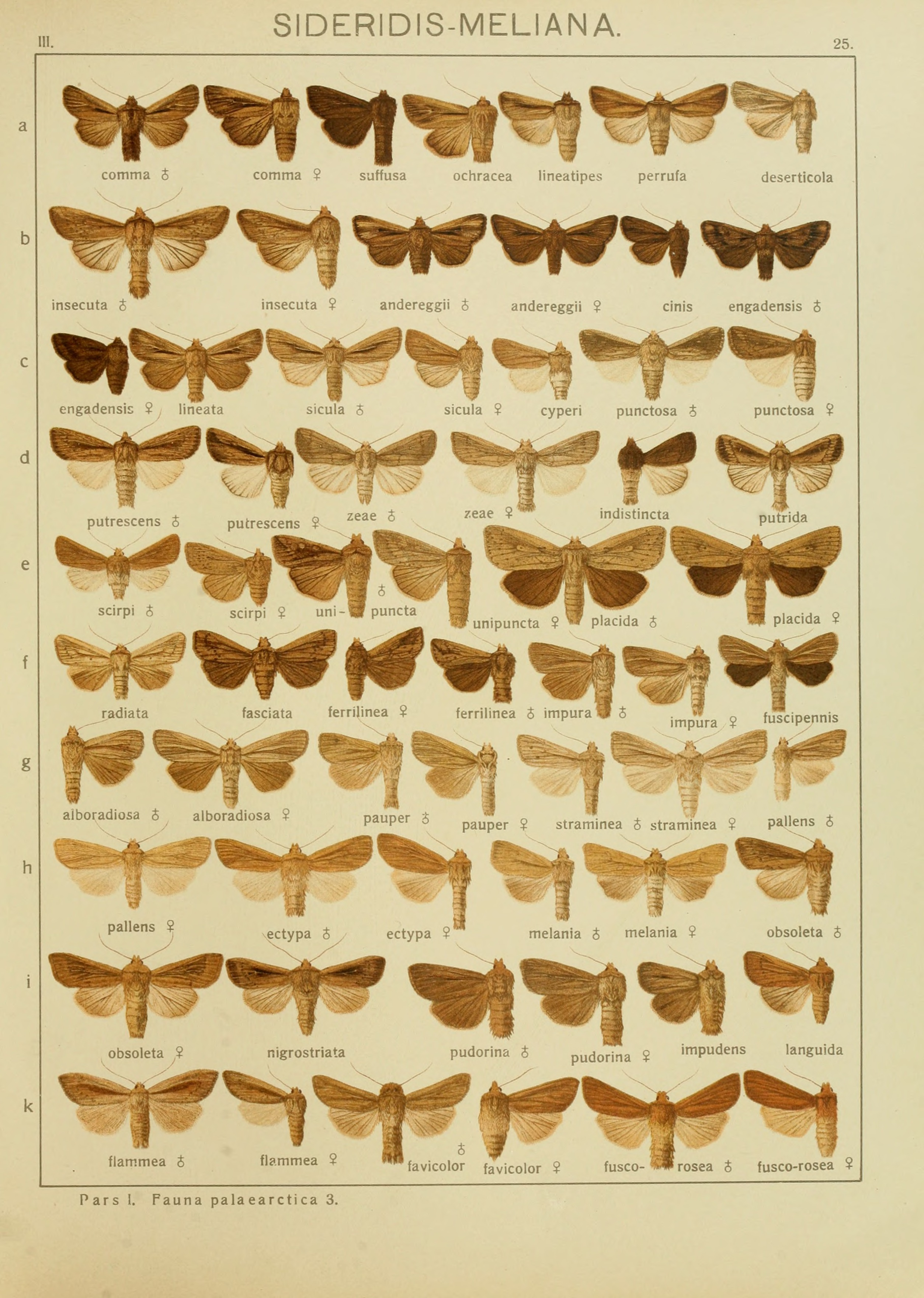
- Leucania punctosa in Seitz figure 25c

Scientific classification
- Domain: Eukaryota
- Kingdom: Animalia
- Phylum: Arthropoda
- Class: Insecta
- Order: Lepidoptera
- Superfamily: Noctuoidea
- Family: Noctuidae
- Genus: Leucania
- Species: L. punctosa

Binomial name
- Leucania punctosa (Treitschke, 1825)

Synonyms
- Simyra punctosa Treitschke, 1825; Mythimna punctosa

= Leucania punctosa =

Species of moth

Leucania punctosa is a species of moth of the family Noctuidae. It is found from Morocco to Libya, southern Europe, Turkey, Armenia, Israel, Lebanon, Jordan, the Sinai in Egypt, Iran, Iraq and Turkmenistan.

== Technical description and variation ==
S. punctosa Tr. (25c). Forewing luteous grey; costa paler; a grey brown shade along median vein and outer margin; veins grey: lines finely zigzag, mostly broken up into linear points; a slightly elongated whitish spot at lower angle of cell on a grey cloud; hindwing white. Larva yellowish grey, paler at sides; dorsal line fine, white, black-edged; subdorsal blackish, interrupted, whitish-edged beneath; spiracles brown in a red ring, above a white line.

== Biology ==
Adults are on wing from October to November. There is one generation per year.

The larvae feed on various Gramineae species.
