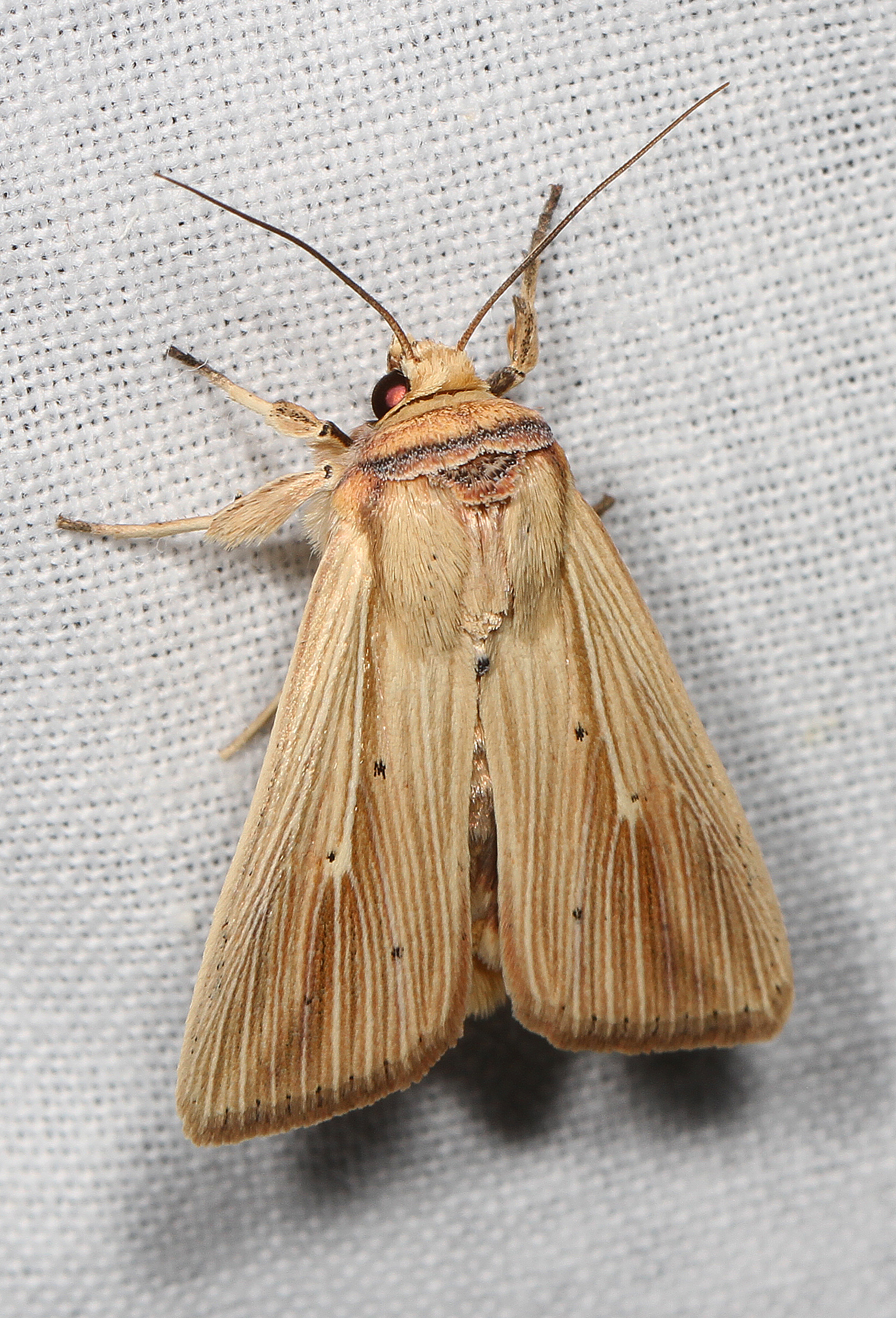

Scientific classification
- Kingdom: Animalia
- Phylum: Arthropoda
- Clade: Pancrustacea
- Class: Insecta
- Order: Lepidoptera
- Superfamily: Noctuoidea
- Family: Noctuidae
- Genus: Leucania
- Species: L. adjuta

Binomial name
- Leucania adjuta (Grote, 1874)

= Leucania adjuta =

Species of moth

Leucania adjuta, the adjutant wainscot, is a species of cutworm or dart moth in the family Noctuidae. It is found in North America.

The MONA or Hodges number for Leucania adjuta is 10456.
