= Leucania multilinea =

Scientific classification
- Kingdom: Animalia
- Phylum: Arthropoda
- Class: Insecta
- Order: Lepidoptera
- Superfamily: Noctuoidea
- Family: Noctuidae
- Genus: Leucania
- Species: L. multilinea

Binomial name
- Leucania multilinea Walker, 1856

Species of moth

Leucania multilinea, the many-lined wainscot, is a species of cutworm or dart moth in the family Noctuidae. It is found in North America.

The MONA or Hodges number for Leucania multilinea is 10446.
