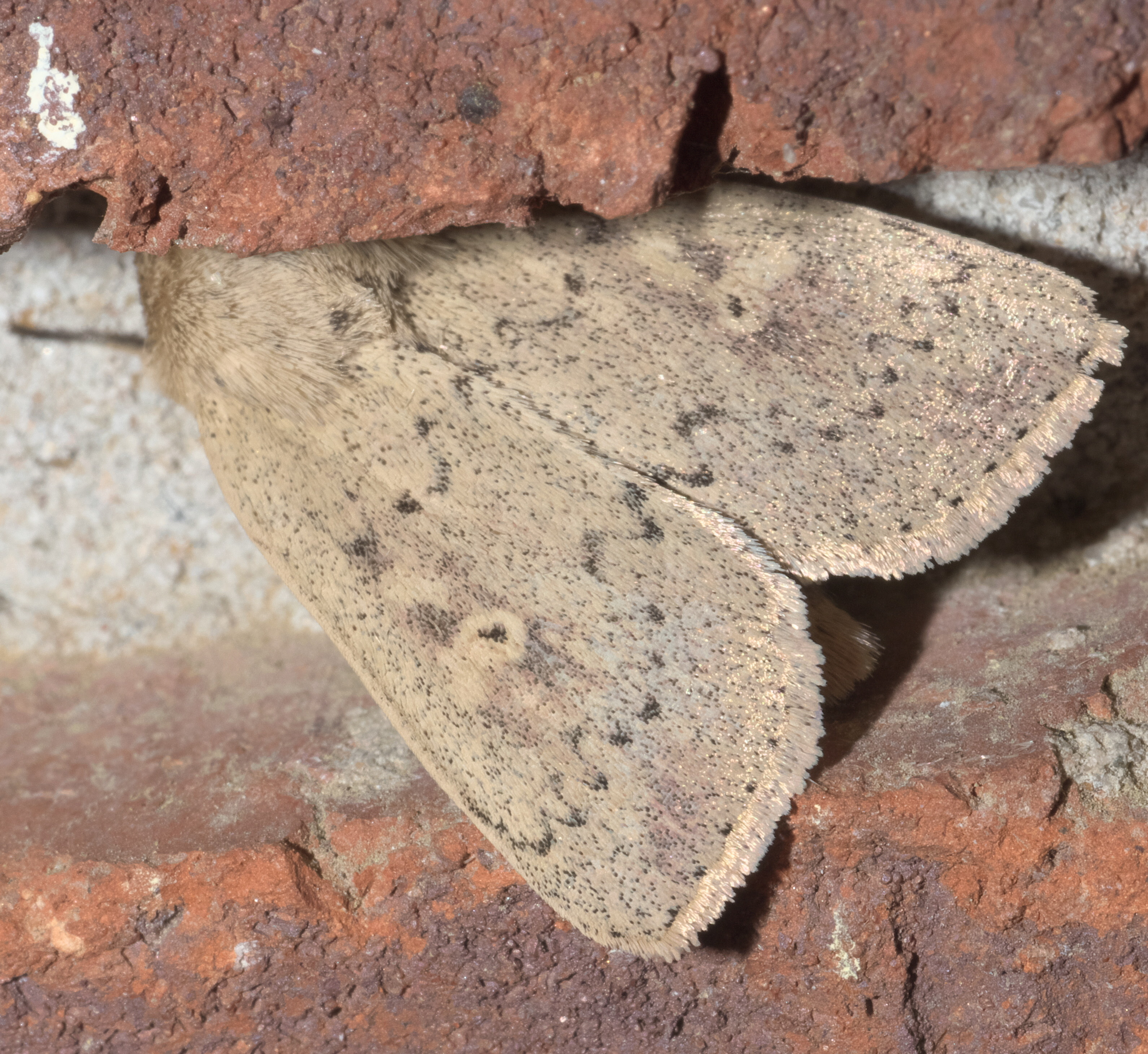

Scientific classification
- Kingdom: Animalia
- Phylum: Arthropoda
- Clade: Pancrustacea
- Class: Insecta
- Order: Lepidoptera
- Superfamily: Noctuoidea
- Family: Noctuidae
- Genus: Leucania
- Species: L. ursula

Binomial name
- Leucania ursula (Forbes, 1936)

= Leucania ursula =

Species of moth

Leucania ursula, the ursula wainscot, is a species of cutworm or dart moth in the family Noctuidae. It is found in North America.

The MONA or Hodges number for Leucania ursula is 10461.

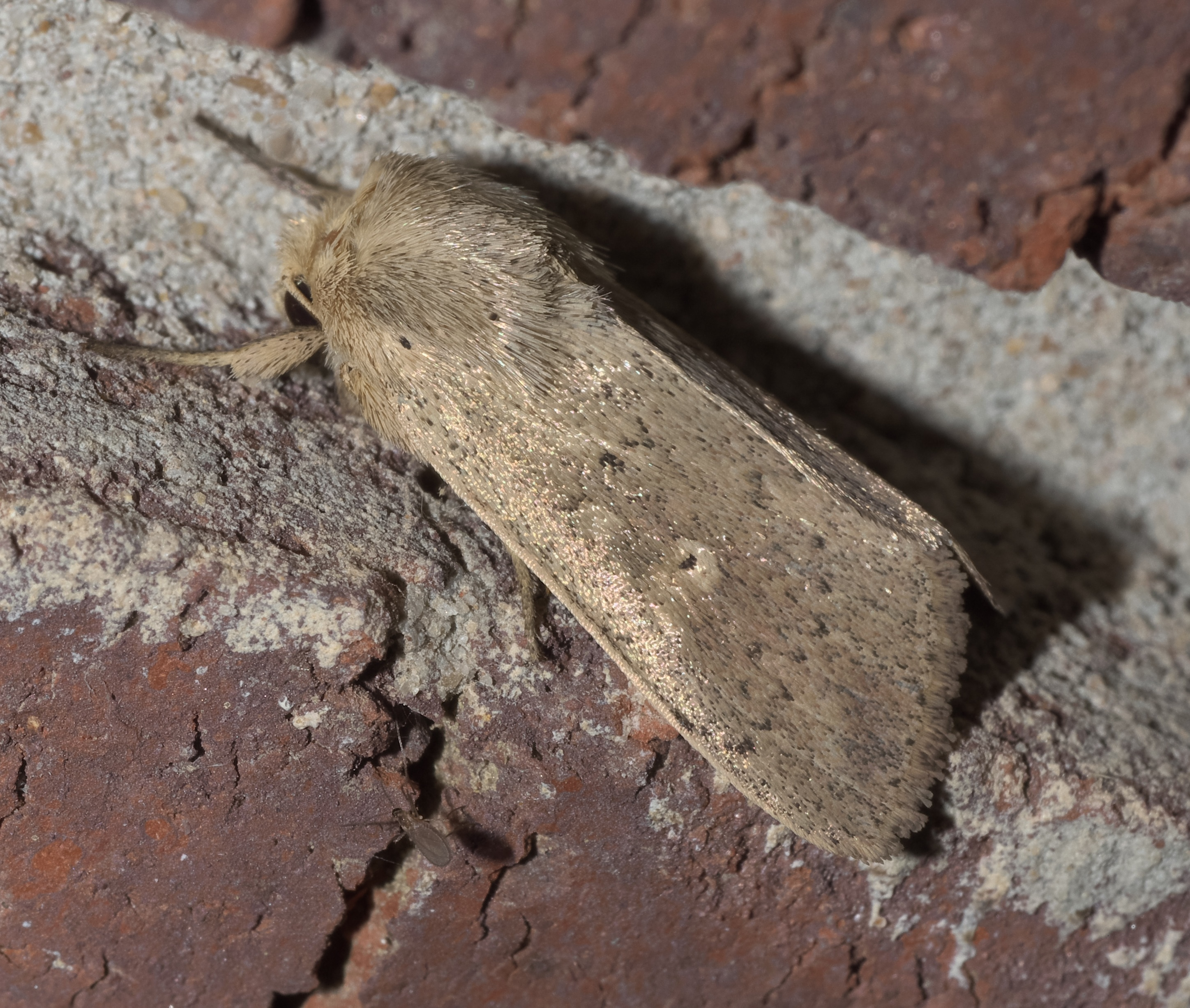
Ursula wainscot, Leucania ursula
