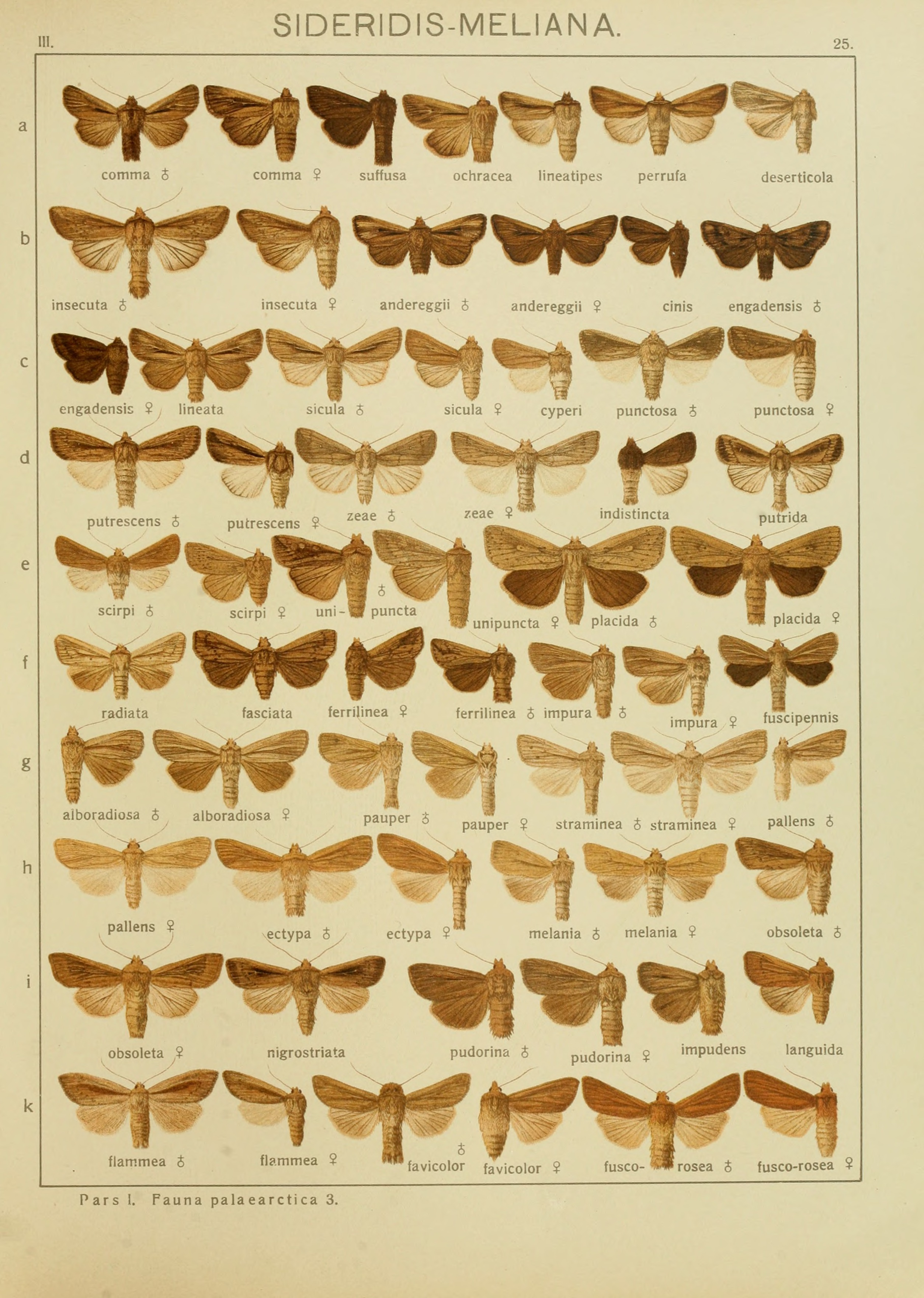
- figures h, i

Scientific classification
- Kingdom: Animalia
- Phylum: Arthropoda
- Clade: Pancrustacea
- Class: Insecta
- Order: Lepidoptera
- Superfamily: Noctuoidea
- Family: Noctuidae
- Genus: Mythimna
- Species: M. obsoleta

Binomial name
- Mythimna obsoleta (Hübner, 1803)

Synonyms
- Noctua obsoleta Hubner, [1803]; Leucania intermissa Walker, 1865; Leucania insecuta Walker, 1865; Cirpis insecuta; Neoborolia nohirae Matsumura, 1926; Leucania nohirae; Borolia griseola Matsumura

= Mythimna obsoleta =

Species of moth

Mythimna obsoleta, the obscure wainscot, is a moth of the family Noctuidae. The species was first described by Jacob Hübner in 1803. It is found in Europe, from southern Fennoscandia to Spain, Italy and the Balkans, the European part of Russia, the Caucasus, Kazakhstan, Kyrgyzia, southern Siberia, Turkey, the Ural, Mongolia, the Russian Far East, the Korean Peninsula, China and Hokkaido and Honshu in Japan.

== Technical description and variation ==
S. obsoleta Hbn. (25 h, i). Forewing greyish ochreous, dusted with black; veins whitish defined by blackish lines and with black streaks in the intervals; a distinct white point at lower angle of cell; an outer series of dark dashes on veins, sometimes an inner one too; hindwing whitish with veins and terminal area fuscous : — the female is much less grey than the male; in some cases the grey scales are much developed between the veins and along the cell of forewing, and form the aberrations nigrostriata Tutt (25 i) and grisea Tutt, according as the ground colour is tinged with reddish, or remains grey. Larva yellowish grey with a flesh coloured tinge; dorsal and subdorsal lines fine, whitish; the space between them freckled with dark; spiracular line pale; spiracles white with black rings.

== Biology ==
The wingspan is 36–40 mm. The moth flies from May to July depending on the location.

The larvae feed on Phragmites australis eating the leaves, but hiding by day and finally pupating in the hollow cut stems.
