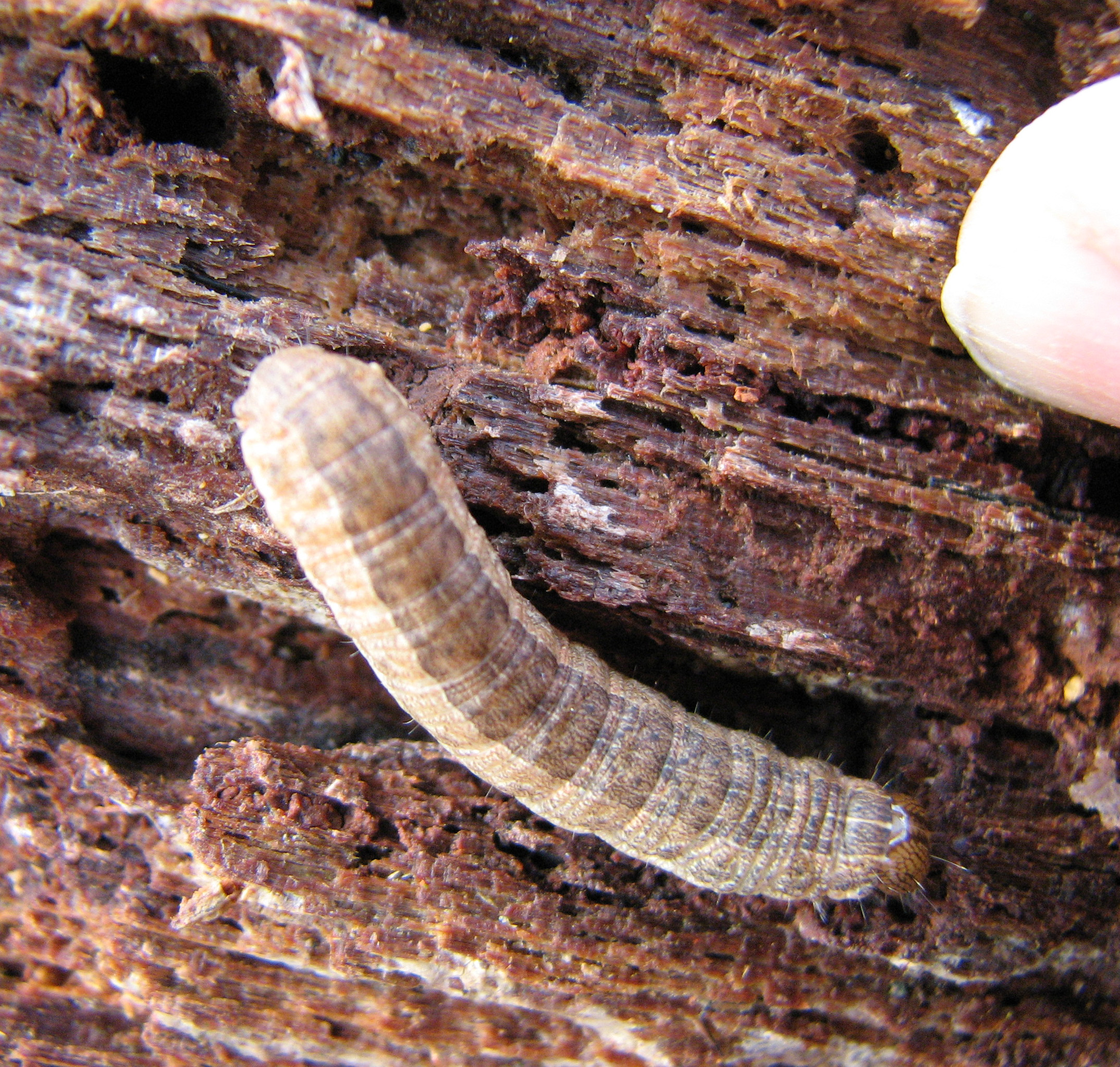
- Leucaniini caterpillar (possibly Leucania pseudargyria)

Scientific classification
- Kingdom: Animalia
- Phylum: Arthropoda
- Clade: Pancrustacea
- Class: Insecta
- Order: Lepidoptera
- Superfamily: Noctuoidea
- Family: Noctuidae
- Subfamily: Noctuinae
- Tribe: Leucaniini

= Leucaniini =

Tribe of moths

Leucaniini is a tribe of cutworm or dart moth in the family Noctuidae. There are at least 40 described species in Leucaniini.

== Genera ==
- Leucania Ochsenheimer, 1816
- Mythimna Ochsenheimer, 1816
- Senta Stephens, 1834
