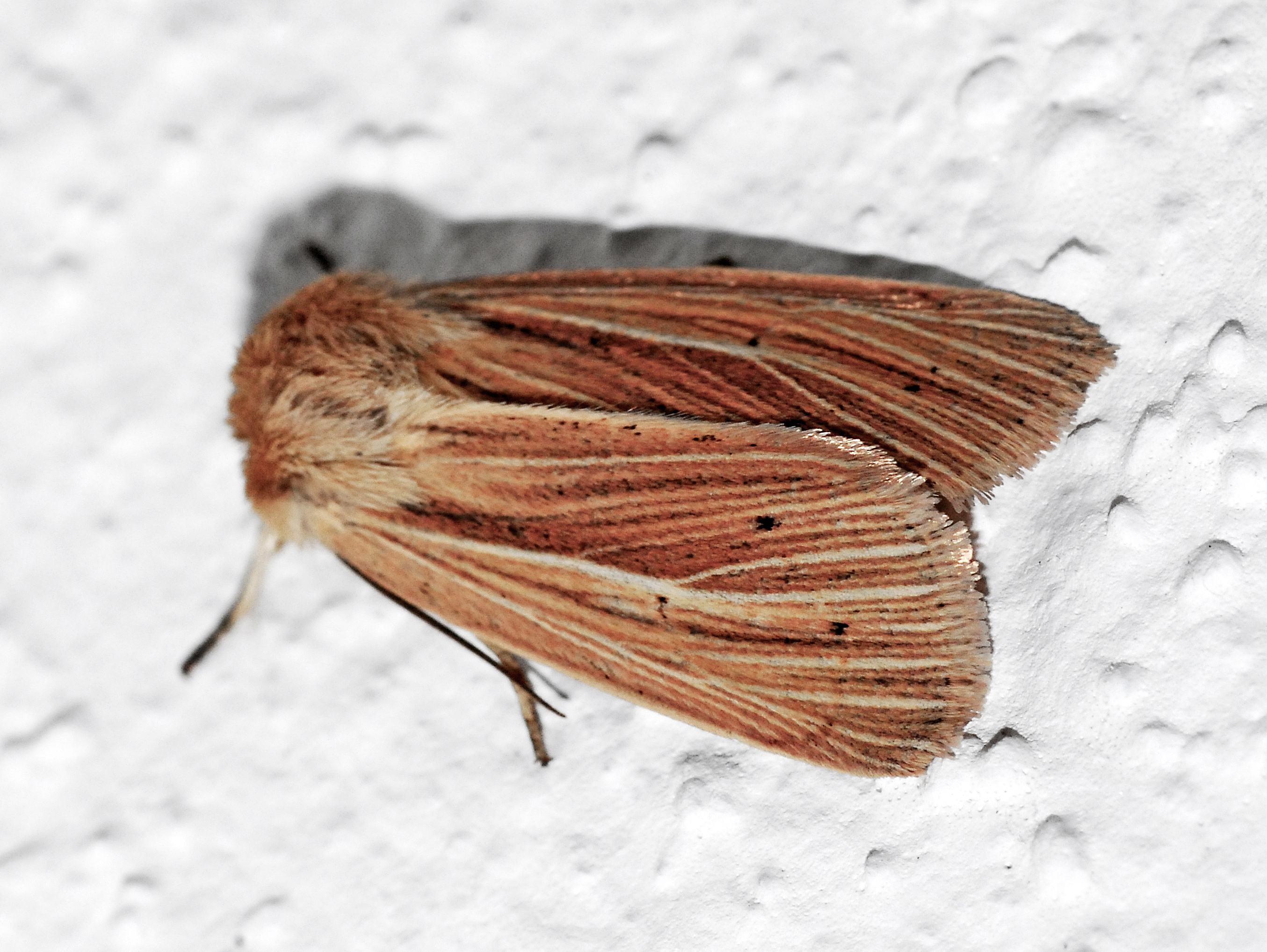

Scientific classification
- Domain: Eukaryota
- Kingdom: Animalia
- Phylum: Arthropoda
- Class: Insecta
- Order: Lepidoptera
- Superfamily: Noctuoidea
- Family: Noctuidae
- Genus: Mythimna
- Species: M. congrua

Binomial name
- Mythimna congrua (Hübner, 1817)

Synonyms
- Noctua congrua Hübner, 1817; Noctua amnicola Rambur, 1829; Aletia congrua

= Mythimna congrua =

Species of moth

Mythimna congrua is a species of moth of the family Noctuidae.

== Etymology ==
The species name congrua, meaning congruous, refers to the similarity of these moths with other species.

== Distribution ==
This species is widespread in southern Europe, Algeria, Turkey, Israel, Syria, the Caucasian and Transcaucasian region, Azerbaijan, Iraq and Turkmenistan.

== Habitat ==
These moths frequently occur in damp environments (marshes floodplain, etc.) and in humid grassy areas.

== Description ==
The moth has a wingspan of 31-36mm. These moths have rather broad forewings, with a yellowish-ocher ground color and clearer veins spread across the surface. A larger clearer vein divides the median area. Hindwings are mainly greyish with several veins and a dark gray dusting. The caterpillars are yellowish, with white and ocher longitudinal lines and small black spots along the body. This species is rather similar to Mythimna riparia.

== Biology ==
Adults are on wing from January to April. There is possibly one generation in Israel, with adults on wing from January to May. In Europe there are two generations from March to June and from August to October. The larvae hibernate. They feed on various Poaceae species and probably also on Cyperaceae).

== Bibliography ==
- Hubner, J. [1800-1838]: Sammlung europäischer Schmetterlinge 4: pl. 1-185.
- O. Karsholt, J. Razowski (eds.), 1996. The Lepidoptera of Europe: a distributional checklist
- SwissLepTeam (2010): Die Schmetterlinge (Lepidoptera) der Schweiz: Eine kommentierte, systematisch-faunistische Liste. Fauna Helvetica 25. Neuchâtel (CSCF & SEG) 160, Nr. 10019
