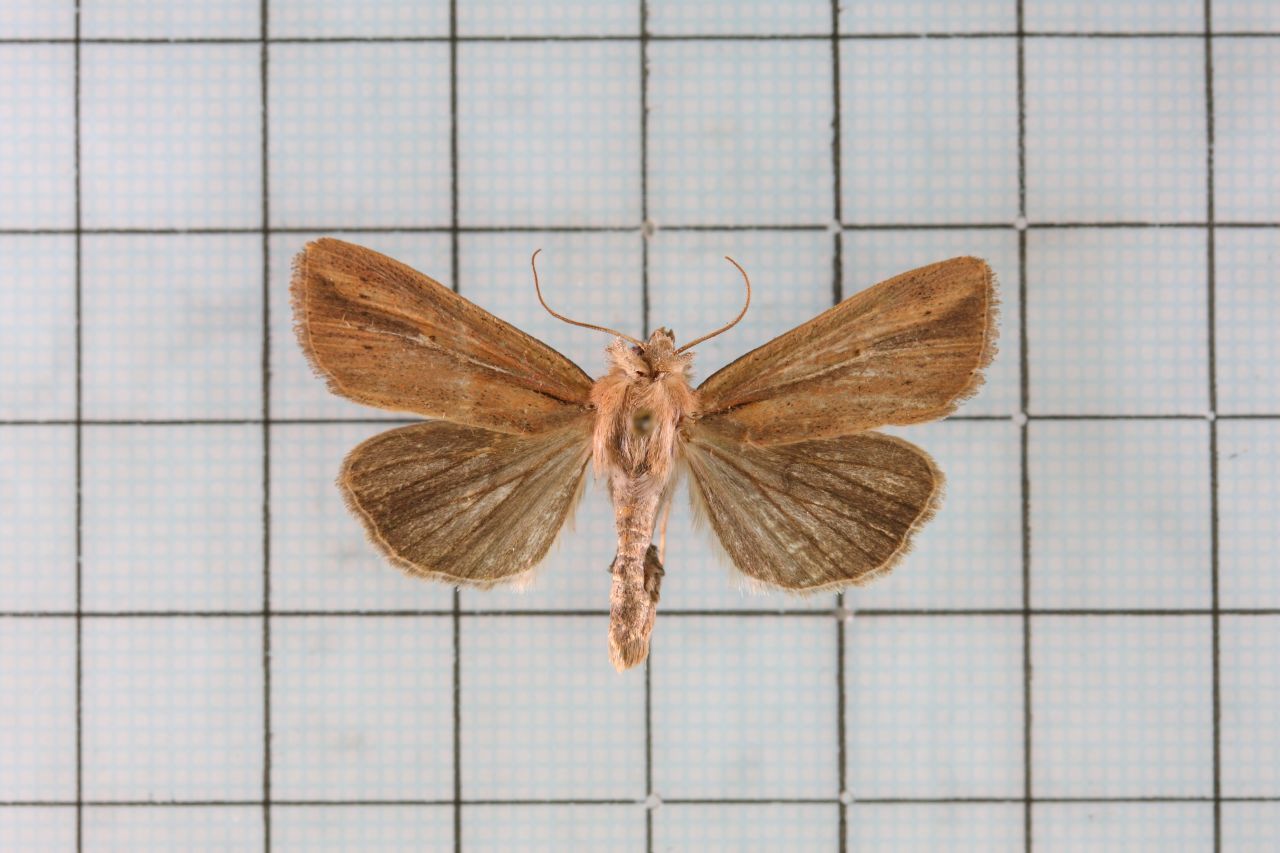

Scientific classification
- Kingdom: Animalia
- Phylum: Arthropoda
- Class: Insecta
- Order: Lepidoptera
- Superfamily: Noctuoidea
- Family: Noctuidae
- Genus: Mythimna
- Species: M. pallidicosta

Binomial name
- Mythimna pallidicosta (Hampson, 1894)

Synonyms
- Leucania pallidicosta Hampson, 1894; Aletia albicosta Moore, 1882 (preocc. Leucania albicosta Moore, 1881); Pseudaletia pallidicosta

= Mythimna pallidicosta =

Species of moth

Mythimna pallidicosta is a moth in the family Noctuidae first described by George Hampson in 1894. It is found from north-eastern India to western China, Sri Lanka, Taiwan, Sundaland, Flores, the Philippines and Japan.

== Description ==
Its wingspan is 45 mm. Vertex of head of the costa of forewing and veins of outer areas are whitish. Forewings with pale brown ground color. Orbicular and reniform stigmata traceable. Male lack paired tufts on basal segments of abdomen below. A minute white speck found at lower angle of cell with a black speck inside it. There are fairly prominent postmedial and marginal series of black specks. Postmedial speck series s curved. There is an oblique dark apical streak. Hindwings are pale suffused with fuscous.

== Subspecies ==
- Mythimna pallidicosta pallidicosta
- Mythimna pallidicosta brevipennis (Warren, 1913) (Sri Lanka)
- Mythimna pallidicosta saturata (Warren, 1913) (Malay Peninsula)
