= Mythimna speciosa =

Scientific classification
- Domain: Eukaryota
- Kingdom: Animalia
- Phylum: Arthropoda
- Class: Insecta
- Order: Lepidoptera
- Superfamily: Noctuoidea
- Family: Noctuidae
- Genus: Mythimna
- Species: M. speciosa

Binomial name
- Mythimna speciosa (Yoshimatsu, 1991)

Synonyms
- Aletia speciosa Yoshimatsu, 1991

Species of moth

Mythimna speciosa is a moth in the family Noctuidae. It is found in India.

The length of the forewings is about 16.4 mm.
