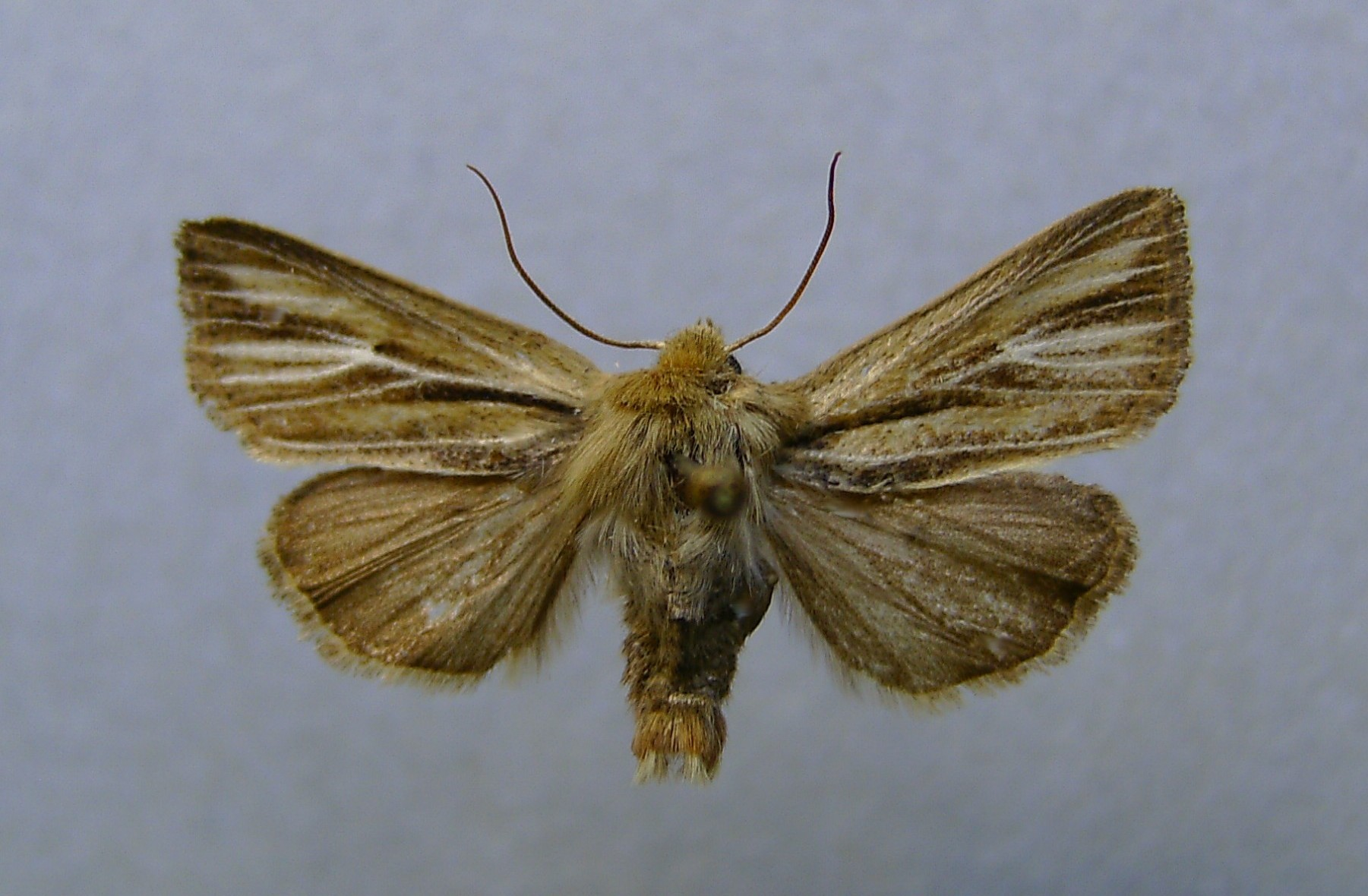

Scientific classification
- Domain: Eukaryota
- Kingdom: Animalia
- Phylum: Arthropoda
- Class: Insecta
- Order: Lepidoptera
- Superfamily: Noctuoidea
- Family: Noctuidae
- Genus: Mythimna
- Species: M. anderreggii

Binomial name
- Mythimna anderreggii (Boisduval, 1840)

Synonyms
- Leucania anderreggii Boisduval, 1840; Leucania pseudocomma Rebel, 1931; Leucania lineata Eversmann, 1842; Leucania valesicola Guenée, 1852; Leucania cinis Freyer, 1858; Leucania rupicapra Lederer, 1860; Agrotis engadinensis Millière, 1873

= Mythimna anderreggii =

Species of moth

Mythimna anderreggii is a moth in the family Noctuidae. It is found in the mountains of Europe (Alps, the Apennines, Abruzzo, the Pyrenees and Balkan Peninsula). It is also present in the northern Caucasus, the Gissar Range, the Pamir Mountains and the Tian Shan mountains.

The wingspan is about 27–34 mm. There is one generation per year, with adults on wing from May to October.

The larvae feed on various grasses, including Dactylis glomerata. The species overwinters in the pupal stage.
