= Mythimna alopecuri =

Scientific classification
- Domain: Eukaryota
- Kingdom: Animalia
- Phylum: Arthropoda
- Class: Insecta
- Order: Lepidoptera
- Superfamily: Noctuoidea
- Family: Noctuidae
- Genus: Mythimna
- Species: M. alopecuri

Binomial name
- Mythimna alopecuri (Boisduval, 1840)

Synonyms
- Leucania alopecuri Boisduval, 1840; Sideridis scirpi syriaca Osthelder, 1933; Aletia alopecuri

Species of moth

Mythimna alopecuri is a species of moth of the family Noctuidae. It is found in southern Europe, Turkey, the Caucasus region, Israel, Jordan, Iraq, Iran, the European part of southern Russia, Ukraine, Kazakhstan and Turkmenistan.

Adults are on wing from April to May and from September to October. There are two generations per year.

The larvae probably feed on various Gramineae species.
