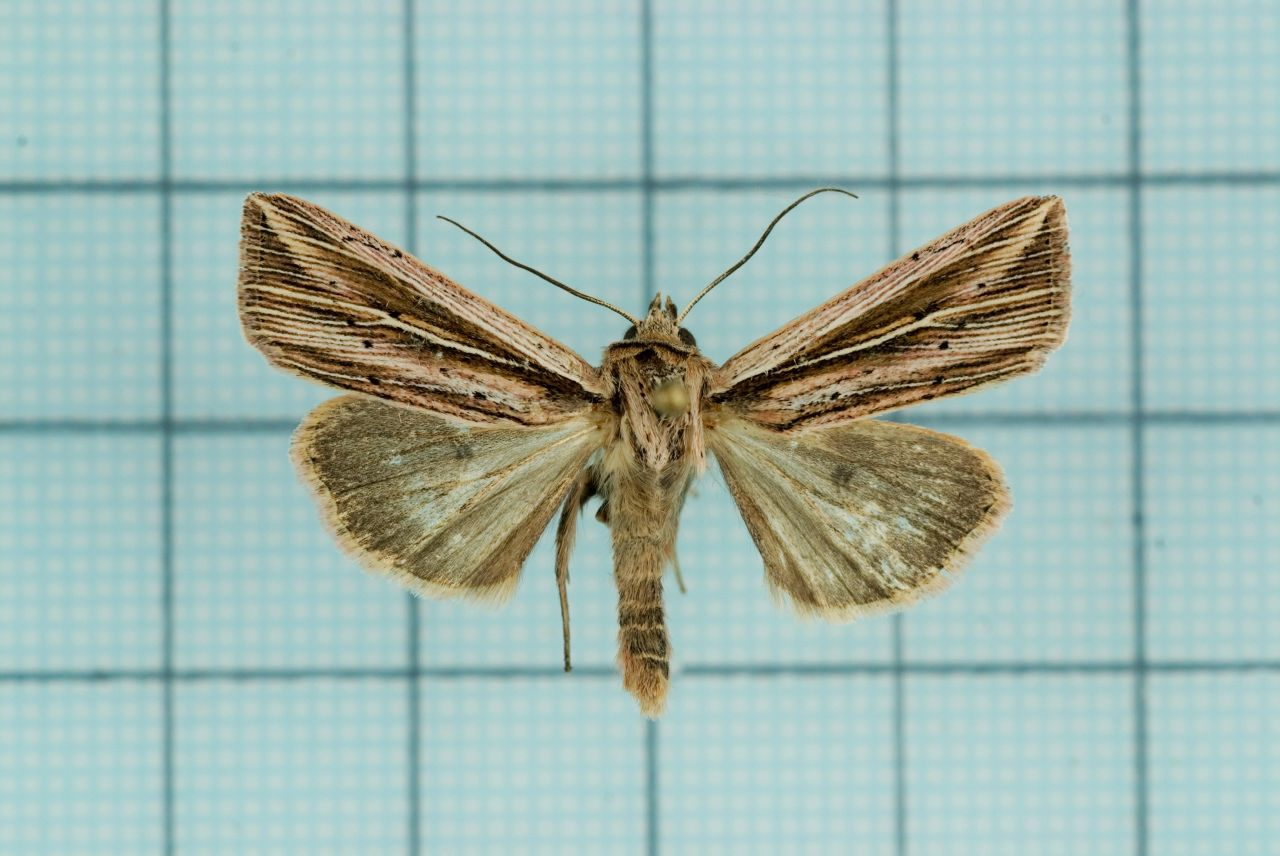

Scientific classification
- Domain: Eukaryota
- Kingdom: Animalia
- Phylum: Arthropoda
- Class: Insecta
- Order: Lepidoptera
- Superfamily: Noctuoidea
- Family: Noctuidae
- Genus: Mythimna
- Species: M. guanyuana

Binomial name
- Mythimna guanyuana (Chang, 1991)

Synonyms
- Aletia guanyuana Chang, 1991

= Mythimna guanyuana =

Species of moth

Mythimna guanyuana is a moth in the family Noctuidae. It is found in Taiwan.
