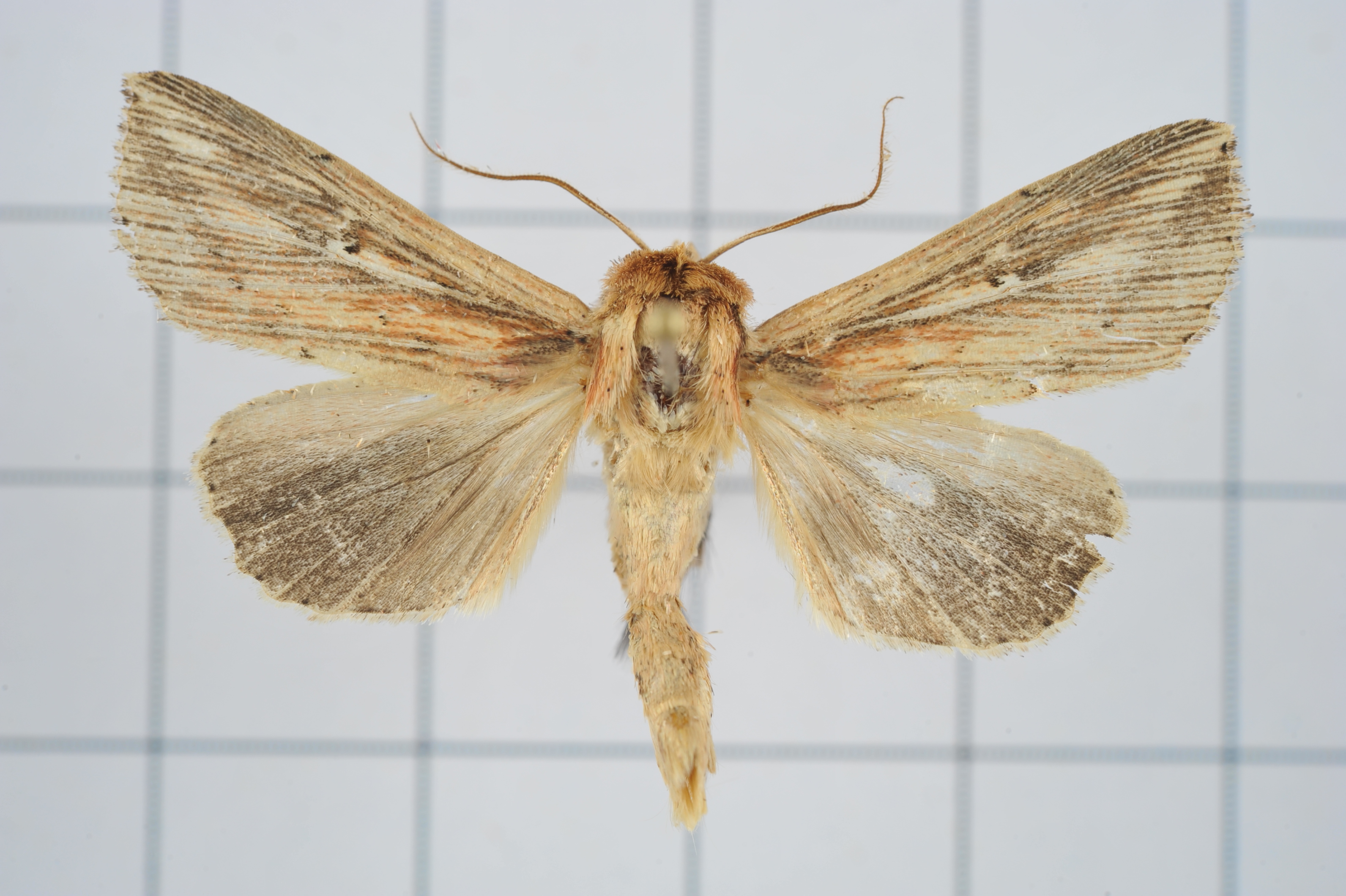

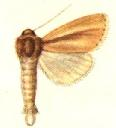

Scientific classification
- Kingdom: Animalia
- Phylum: Arthropoda
- Class: Insecta
- Order: Lepidoptera
- Superfamily: Noctuoidea
- Family: Noctuidae
- Genus: Mythimna
- Species: M. decisissima

Binomial name
- Mythimna decisissima Walker, 1856

Synonyms
- Aletia owadai; Borolia acutangula; Cirphis decisissima; Cirphis kuyaniana; Dorika curta; Dorika aureola; Leucania acutangula; Leucania aureola; Leucania decisissima; Leucania kuyaniana; Leucania nareda; Leucania lanceata; Timora aureola

= Mythimna decisissima =

Species of moth

Mythimna decisissima is a moth of the family Noctuidae first described by Francis Walker in 1856. It is found from India across south-east Asia including Hong Kong, Japan, Taiwan and Australia in Queensland and New South Wales. It is also present in South Africa.

== Description ==
Its wingspan is about 31 mm. In the male, the head, thorax and abdomen are reddish ochreous. Abdomen suffused with fuscous. Forewings with a prominent, short, white "L" mark or streak found on the median nervure. Males with large areas of metallic scales on the underside of wings. Large paired tufts of black hairs found on the basal segment of abdomen below. A pale oblique fascia from the apex outlined by dark suffusion. Antemedial, postmedial and marginal series of black specks, the first two curved and the first obsolescent. Hindwings ochreous, suffused with fuscous, especially on the outer area. Underside with disk of forewing and whole of hindwing except the costa and inner margin clothed with golden silvery scales. Costa of forewing with a postmedial black spot.

The female has a more fuscous suffusion on the forewing, especially in the cell and on each side of the apical streak. Underside lacks silvery areas. Hindwings with a black cell-spot and postmedial series of specks.
