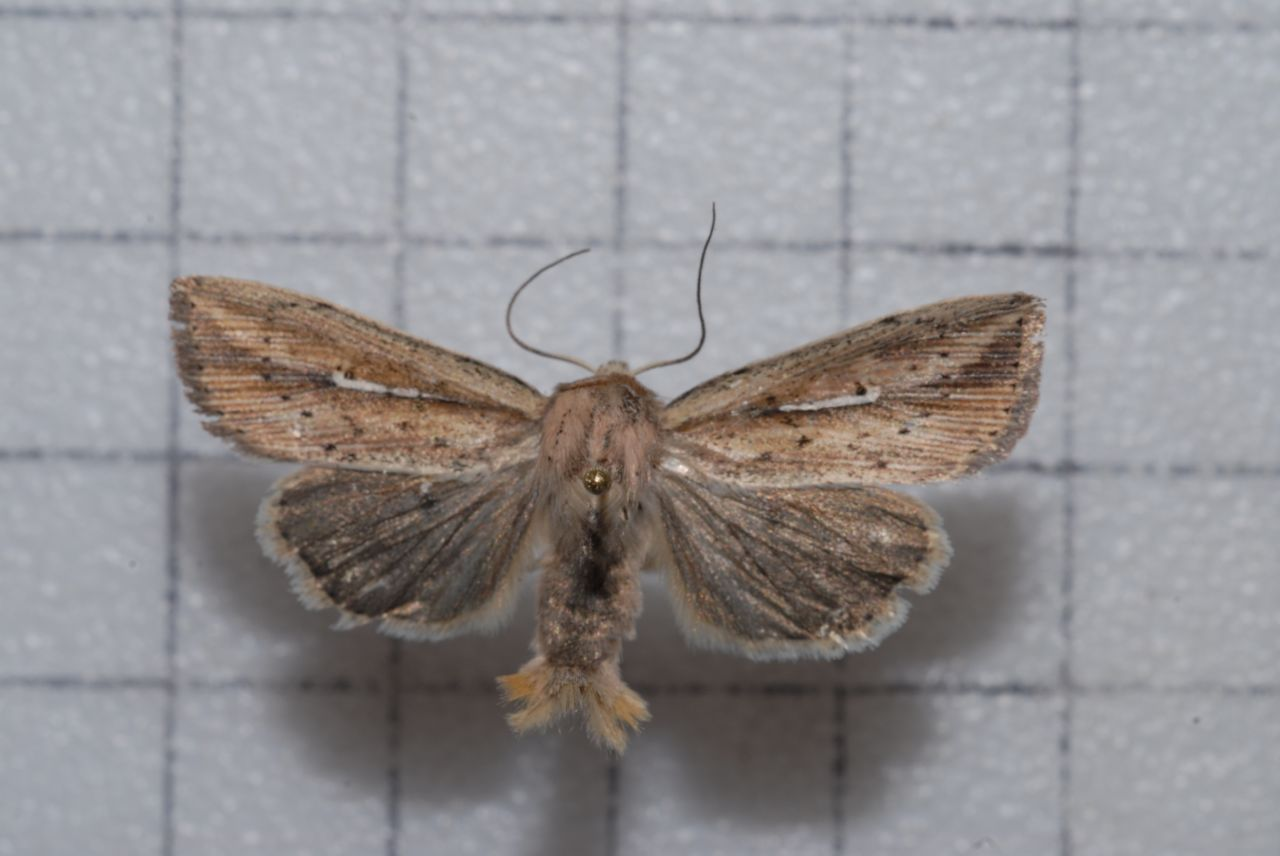

Scientific classification
- Domain: Eukaryota
- Kingdom: Animalia
- Phylum: Arthropoda
- Class: Insecta
- Order: Lepidoptera
- Superfamily: Noctuoidea
- Family: Noctuidae
- Genus: Mythimna
- Species: M. arizanensis

Binomial name
- Mythimna arizanensis (Wileman, 1915)

Synonyms
- Ciprhis arizanensis Wileman, 1915

= Mythimna arizanensis =

Species of moth

Mythimna arizanensis is a moth in the family Noctuidae. It is found in Taiwan.
