= Mythimna scottii =

Scientific classification
- Domain: Eukaryota
- Kingdom: Animalia
- Phylum: Arthropoda
- Class: Insecta
- Order: Lepidoptera
- Superfamily: Noctuoidea
- Family: Noctuidae
- Genus: Mythimna
- Species: M. scottii

Binomial name
- Mythimna scottii (Butler, 1886)

Synonyms
- Leucania scottii Butler, 1886; Meliana scotti

Species of moth

Mythimna scottii is a moth of the family Noctuidae. It has been recorded from Australia (Queensland, the Northern Territory and Western Australia), Fiji, New Caledonia and Hawaii. But it has been listed as a Species inquirenda and might prove to be a synonym.
