= Mythimna distincta =

Scientific classification
- Domain: Eukaryota
- Kingdom: Animalia
- Phylum: Arthropoda
- Class: Insecta
- Order: Lepidoptera
- Superfamily: Noctuoidea
- Family: Noctuidae
- Genus: Mythimna
- Species: M. distincta

Binomial name
- Mythimna distincta Moore, 1881

Synonyms
- Aletia distincta Moore, 1881; Aletia exanthemata Moore, 1888

Species of moth

Mythimna distincta is a moth in the family Noctuidae. It is found in India and Nepal.

The length of the forewings is 14.7–16.9 mm.
