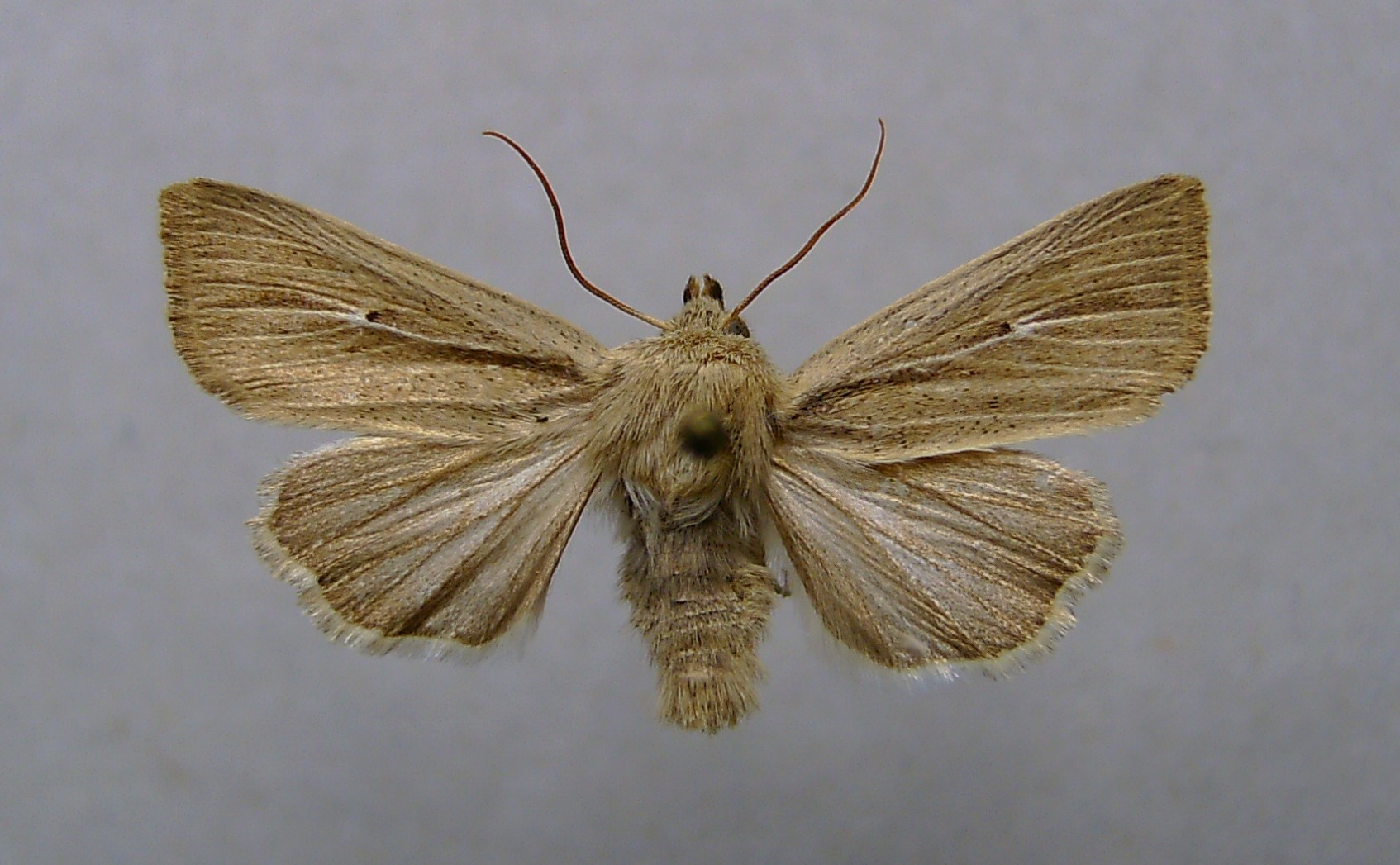

Scientific classification
- Domain: Eukaryota
- Kingdom: Animalia
- Phylum: Arthropoda
- Class: Insecta
- Order: Lepidoptera
- Superfamily: Noctuoidea
- Family: Noctuidae
- Genus: Mythimna
- Species: M. sicula

Binomial name
- Mythimna sicula (Treitschke, 1835)

Synonyms
- Leucania sicula Treitschke, 1835; Leucania cyperi Boisduval, 1840; Leucania dactylidis Boisduval, 1840; Leucania montium Boisduval, 1840; Leucania albivena Graslin, 1852; Leucania fuscilinea Graslin, 1852; Cirphis sicula r. belgiensis Derenne, 1931; Mythimna sicula bavarica Forster & Wohlfahrt, 1971; Mythimna sicula f. pseudoprominens Rungs, 1972; Aletia sicula

= Mythimna sicula =

Species of moth

Mythimna sicula is a species of moth of the family Noctuidae. It is found from Morocco to Libya, central and southern Europe, Turkey, Israel, Iran and Turkmenistan.

Adults are on wing year round. There are multiple generations per year.

The larvae feed on various Gramineae species.
