= Mythimna denticula =

Scientific classification
- Kingdom: Animalia
- Phylum: Arthropoda
- Clade: Pancrustacea
- Class: Insecta
- Order: Lepidoptera
- Superfamily: Noctuoidea
- Family: Noctuidae
- Genus: Mythimna
- Species: M. denticula

Binomial name
- Mythimna denticula (Hampson, 1893)

Synonyms
- Leucania denticula Hampson, 1893

Species of moth

Mythimna denticula, or Mythimna (Mythimna) denticula, is a moth of the family Noctuidae first described by George Hampson in 1893. It is found in Sri Lanka.
