= Mythimna sequax =

Scientific classification
- Domain: Eukaryota
- Kingdom: Animalia
- Phylum: Arthropoda
- Class: Insecta
- Order: Lepidoptera
- Superfamily: Noctuoidea
- Family: Noctuidae
- Tribe: Leucaniini
- Genus: Mythimna
- Species: M. sequax

Binomial name
- Mythimna sequax (Franclemont, 1951)

Species of moth

Mythimna sequax, the wheat armyworm, is a species of cutworm or dart moth in the family Noctuidae.

The MONA or Hodges number for Mythimna sequax is 10438.1.
