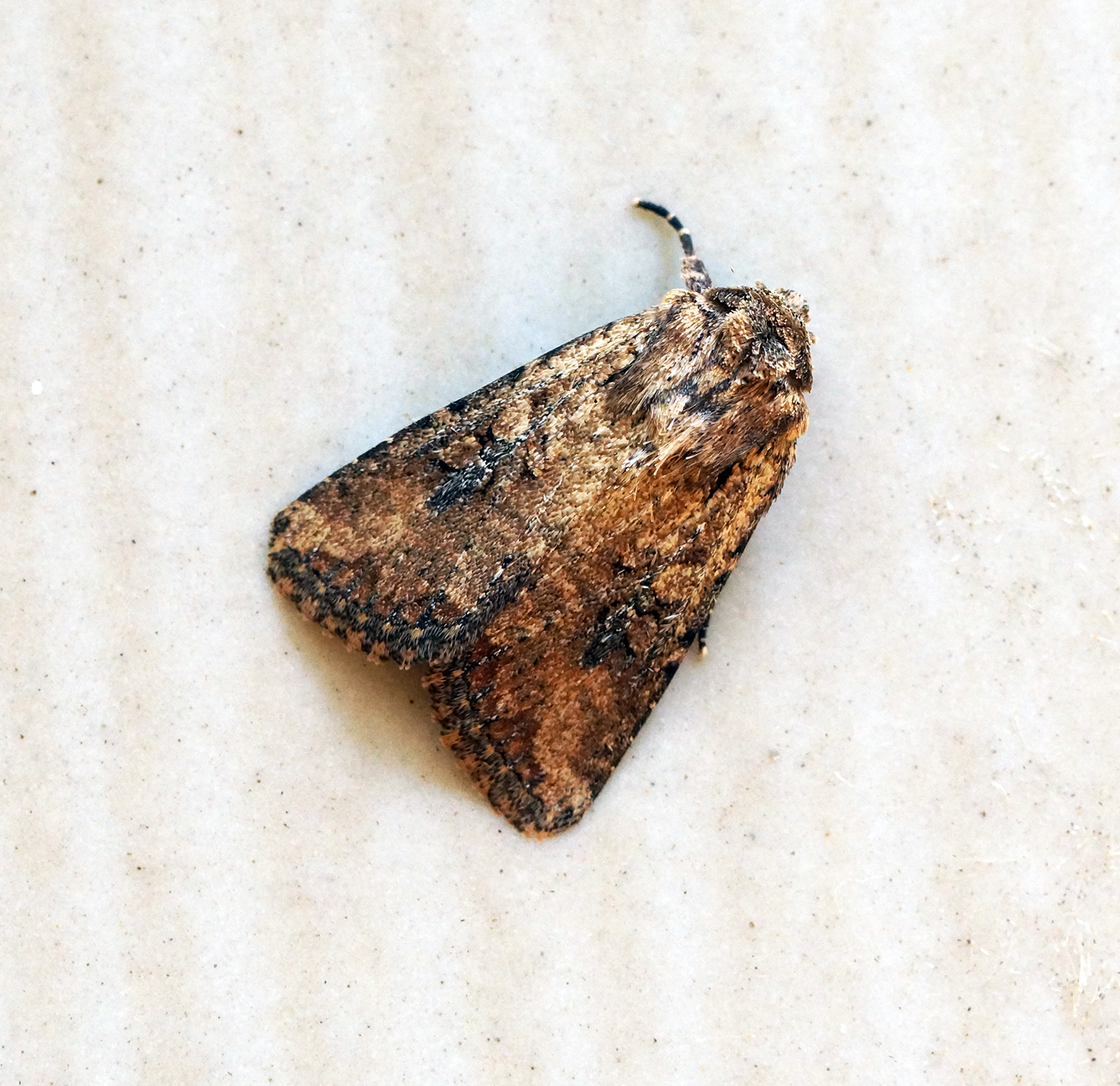

Scientific classification
- Kingdom: Animalia
- Phylum: Arthropoda
- Class: Insecta
- Order: Lepidoptera
- Superfamily: Noctuoidea
- Family: Noctuidae
- Genus: Mythimna
- Species: M. languida

Binomial name
- Mythimna languida (Walker, 1858)

Synonyms
- Hadena languida Walker, 1858; Mamestra zachi Bohatsch, 1880; Mamestra abbas Bethune-Baker, 1894; Borolia sesamiodes Hampson, 1905; Leucania sesamiodes

= Mythimna languida =

Species of moth

Mythimna languida is a species of moth of the family Noctuidae. It is found in almost all parts of tropical and subtropical Africa, Asia and the Mediterranean basin.

Adults are on wing year-round. There are multiple generations per year.

Recorded food plants include Arundo phragmites in Italy and Lavatera species in Egypt.
