= Mythimna hamifera =

Scientific classification
- Kingdom: Animalia
- Phylum: Arthropoda
- Clade: Pancrustacea
- Class: Insecta
- Order: Lepidoptera
- Superfamily: Noctuoidea
- Family: Noctuidae
- Genus: Mythimna
- Species: M. hamifera

Binomial name
- Mythimna hamifera (Guenée, 1852)

Synonyms
- Leucania hamifera Walker, 1862; Leucania inframicans Hampson, 1893; Leucania pryeri Leech, 1900; Aletia hamifera Walker, 1862

Species of moth

Mythimna hamifera is a moth of the family Noctuidae first described by Achille Guenée in 1852. It is found in Sri Lanka, Japan and Borneo.

Its larval host plant is Saccharum.
