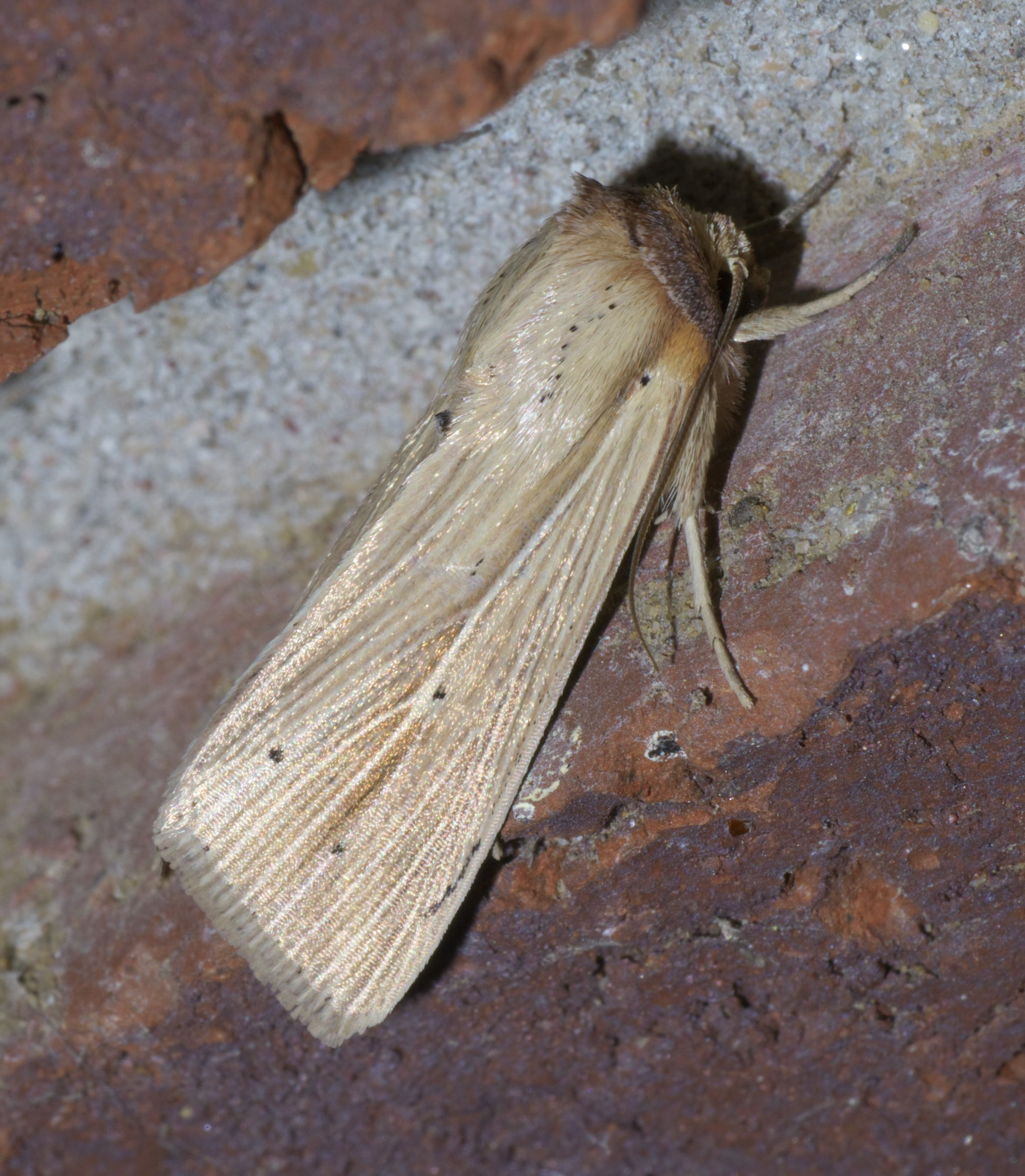

Scientific classification
- Kingdom: Animalia
- Phylum: Arthropoda
- Class: Insecta
- Order: Lepidoptera
- Superfamily: Noctuoidea
- Family: Noctuidae
- Genus: Mythimna
- Species: M. oxygala

Binomial name
- Mythimna oxygala (Grote, 1881)

= Mythimna oxygala =

Species of moth

Mythimna oxygala, the lesser wainscot, is a species of cutworm or dart moth in the family Noctuidae.

The MONA or Hodges number for Mythimna oxygala is 10436.
