= Mythimna obscura =

Scientific classification
- Kingdom: Animalia
- Phylum: Arthropoda
- Clade: Pancrustacea
- Class: Insecta
- Order: Lepidoptera
- Superfamily: Noctuoidea
- Family: Noctuidae
- Genus: Mythimna
- Species: M. obscura

Binomial name
- Mythimna obscura (Moore, 1882)

Synonyms
- Aletia obscura Moore, 1882

Species of moth

Mythimna obscura is a moth of the family Noctuidae first described by Frederic Moore in 1882. It is found in Sri Lanka and India.
