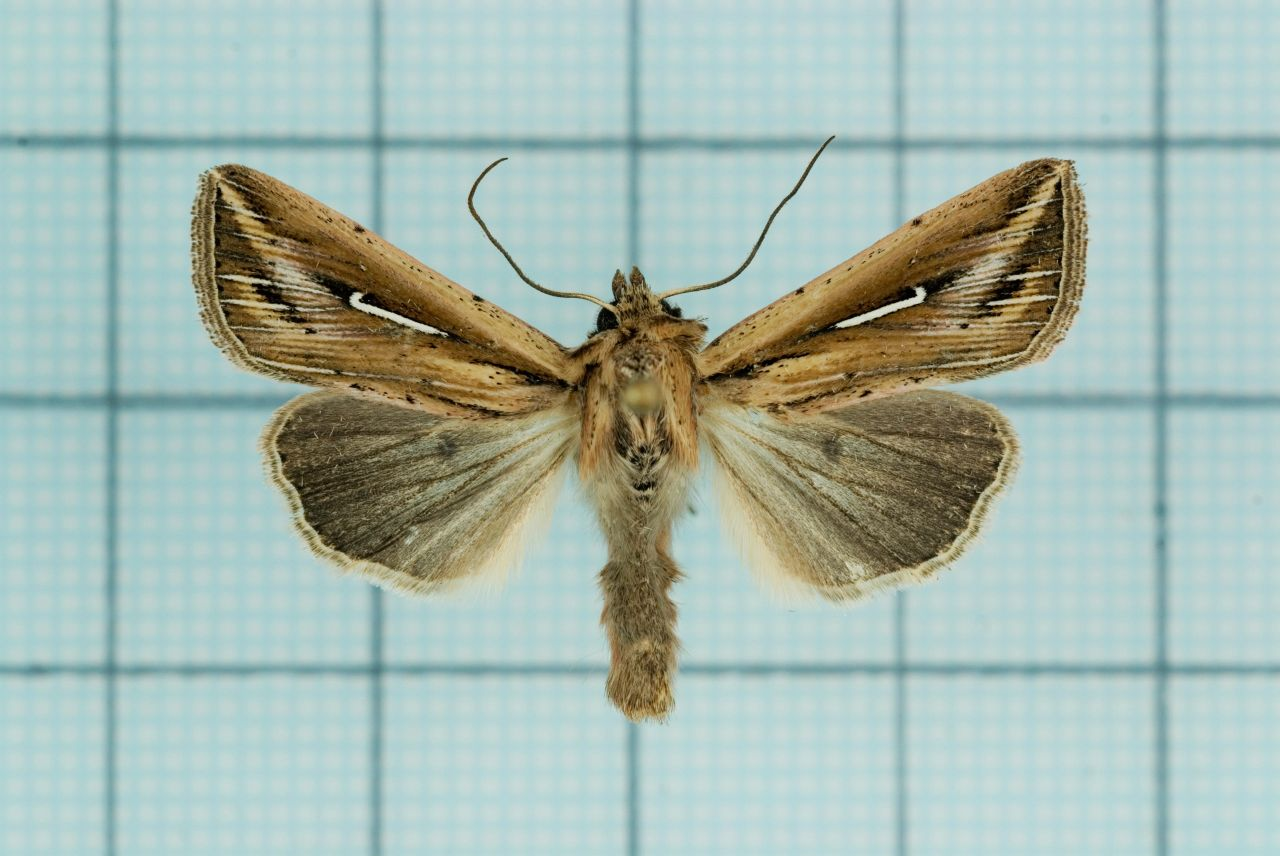

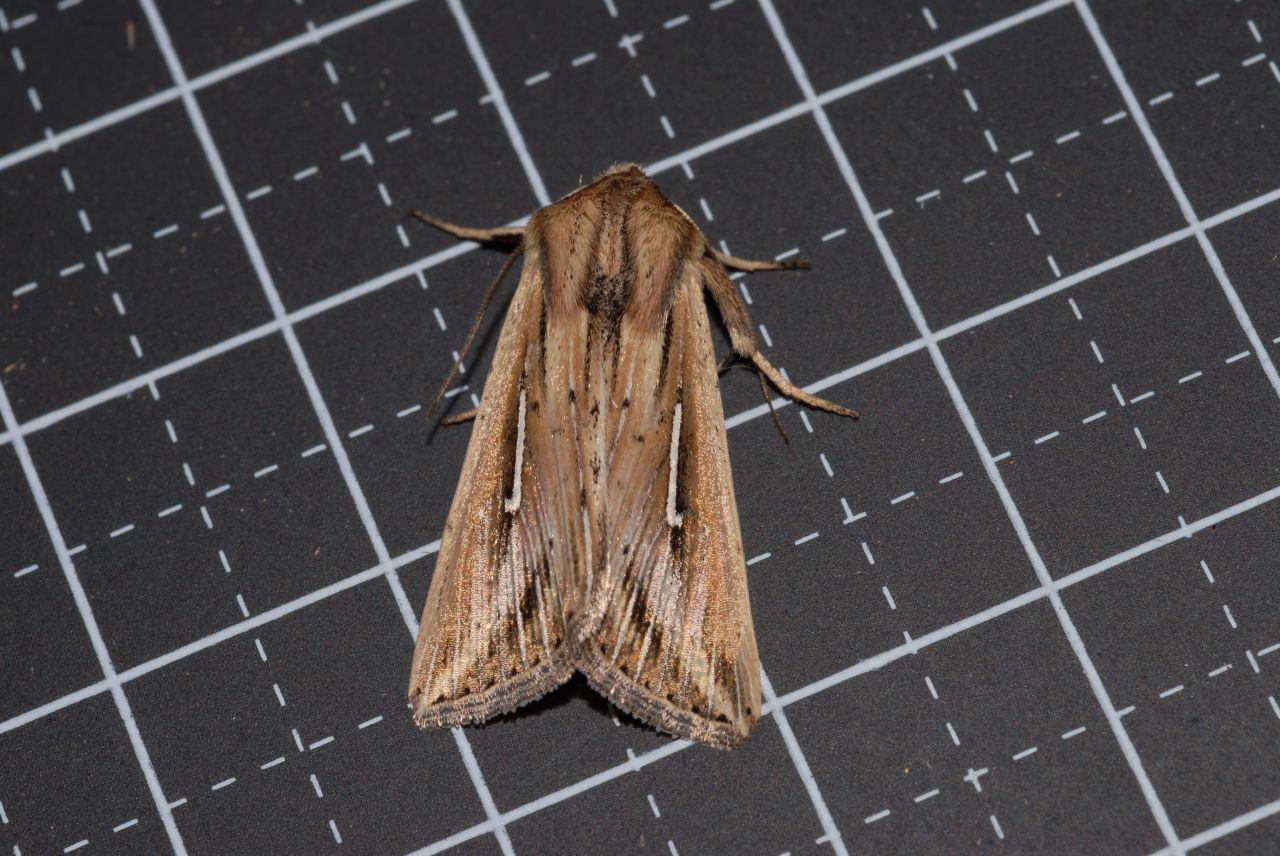

Scientific classification
- Kingdom: Animalia
- Phylum: Arthropoda
- Class: Insecta
- Order: Lepidoptera
- Superfamily: Noctuoidea
- Family: Noctuidae
- Genus: Mythimna
- Species: M. bistrigata

Binomial name
- Mythimna bistrigata (Moore, 1881)

Synonyms
- Leucania bistrigata Moore, 1881; Aletia albipatagis Chang, 1991

= Mythimna bistrigata =

Species of moth

Mythimna bistrigata is a moth in the family Noctuidae. It is found in India and Taiwan.
