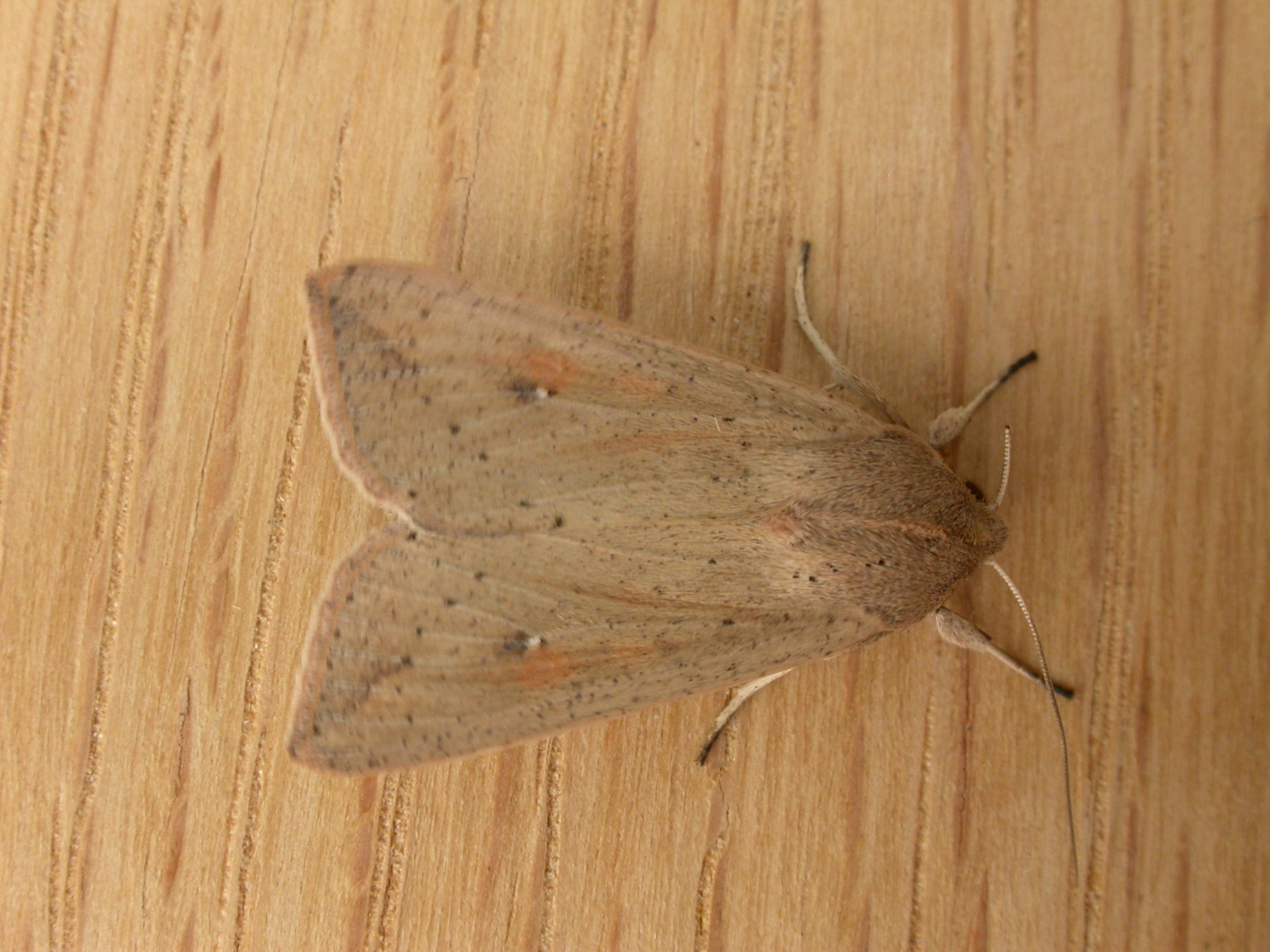

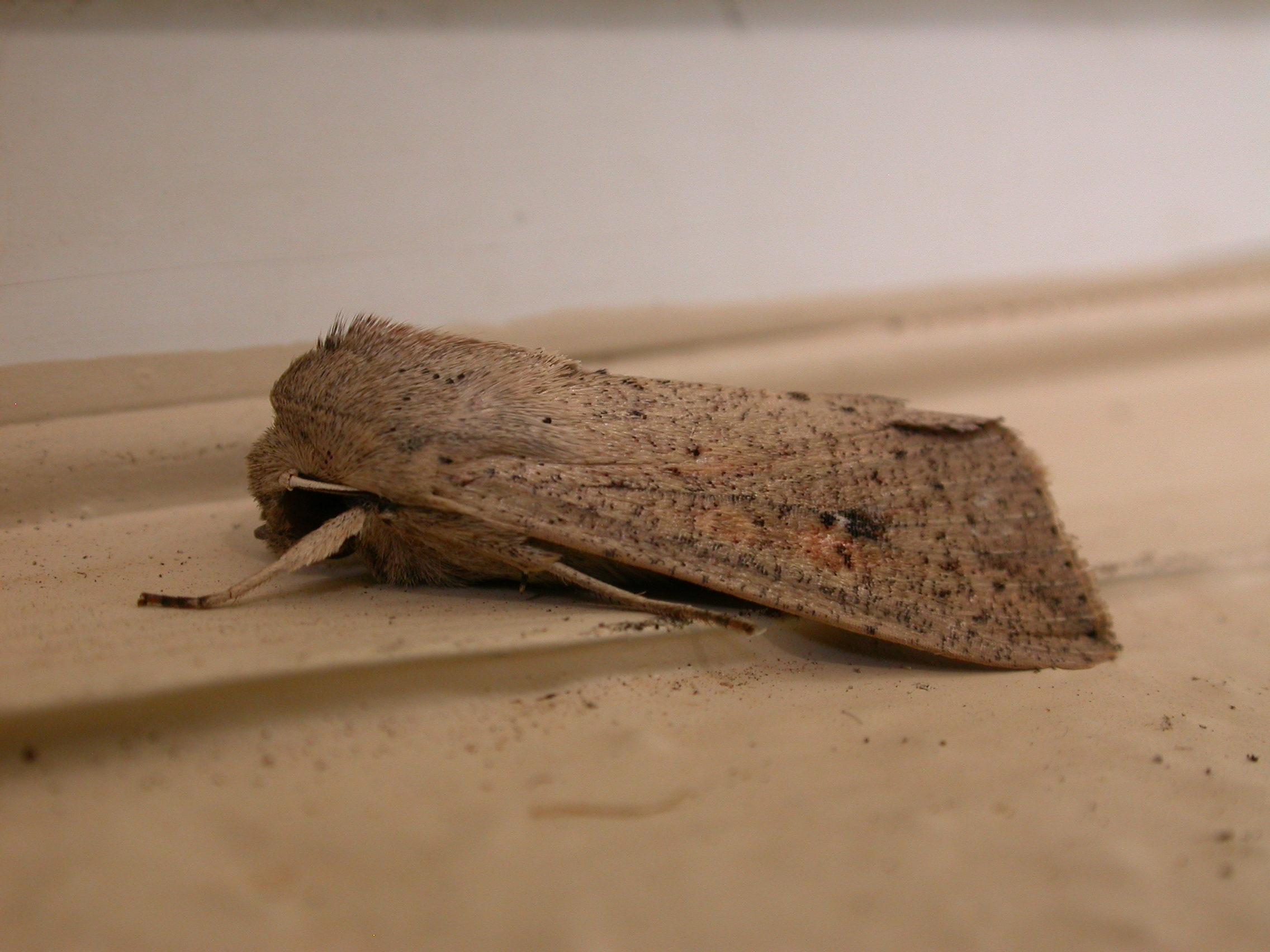

Scientific classification
- Kingdom: Animalia
- Phylum: Arthropoda
- Class: Insecta
- Order: Lepidoptera
- Superfamily: Noctuoidea
- Family: Noctuidae
- Genus: Mythimna
- Species: M. convecta

Binomial name
- Mythimna convecta Walker, 1857

= Mythimna convecta =

Species of moth

Mythimna convecta, the common or Australian armyworm, is a moth of the family Noctuidae and is found in Australia. The wingspan of the moth is about 40 mm.

The term "armyworm" relates to the behaviour of the larvae, which often spread out in a line across a lawn or pasture, and slowly "march" forward en masse, consuming the foliage they encounter. The larvae feed on a range of agricultural plants, such as pineapples (Ananas comosus), sweet potatoes (Ipomoea batatas), alfalfa (Medicago sativa) and various grass species (Poaceae), and are thus considered a pest.
