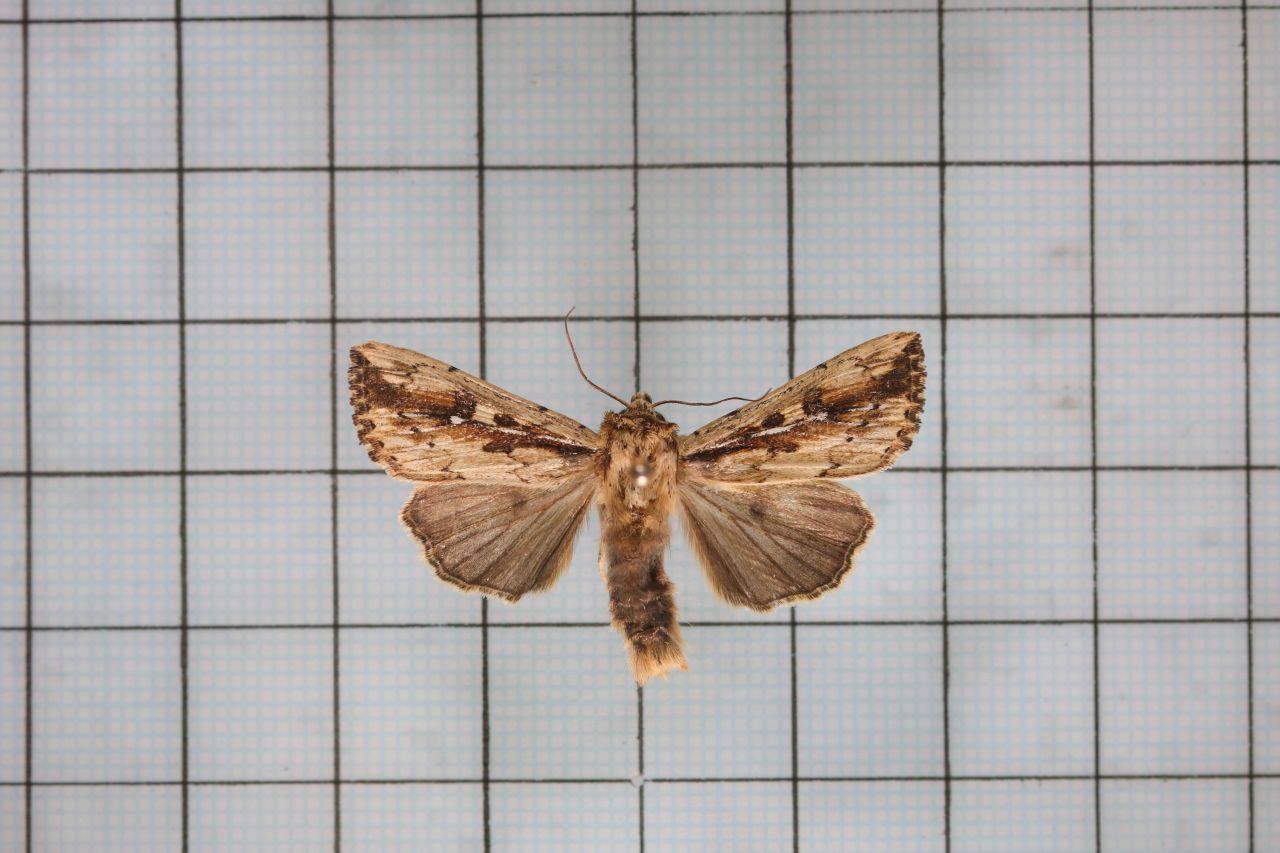

Scientific classification
- Domain: Eukaryota
- Kingdom: Animalia
- Phylum: Arthropoda
- Class: Insecta
- Order: Lepidoptera
- Superfamily: Noctuoidea
- Family: Noctuidae
- Genus: Mythimna
- Species: M. sinuosa

Binomial name
- Mythimna sinuosa (Moore, 1882)

Synonyms
- Leucania sinuosa Moore, 1882

= Mythimna sinuosa =

Species of moth

Mythimna sinuosa is a moth in the family Noctuidae. It is found in India and Taiwan.
