= Mythimna macrosaris =

Scientific classification
- Kingdom: Animalia
- Phylum: Arthropoda
- Class: Insecta
- Order: Lepidoptera
- Superfamily: Noctuoidea
- Family: Noctuidae
- Genus: Mythimna
- Species: M. macrosaris

Binomial name
- Mythimna macrosaris (Meyrick, 1899)

Synonyms
- Pseudaletia macrosaris (Meyrick, 1899); Leucania macrosaris Meyrick, 1899; Cirphis macrosaris; Hyphilare macrosaris; Aletia macrosaris; Leucania pyrrhias Meyrick, 1899; Cirphis pyrrhias; Hyphilare pyrrhias; Aletia pyrrhias; Pseudaletia pyrrhias; Leucania typhlodes Meyrick, 1899; Cirphis typhlodes; Hyphilare typhlodes; Aletia typhlodes; Pseudaletia typhlodes

Species of moth

Mythimna macrosaris is a moth of the family Noctuidae. It was first described by Edward Meyrick in 1899. It is endemic to the Hawaiian islands of Kauai, Oahu, Molokai and Hawaii.

The larvae mainly feed on Baumea meyenii, but have also been recorded feeding on Paspalum conjugatum, bunchgrass and sugarcane.
