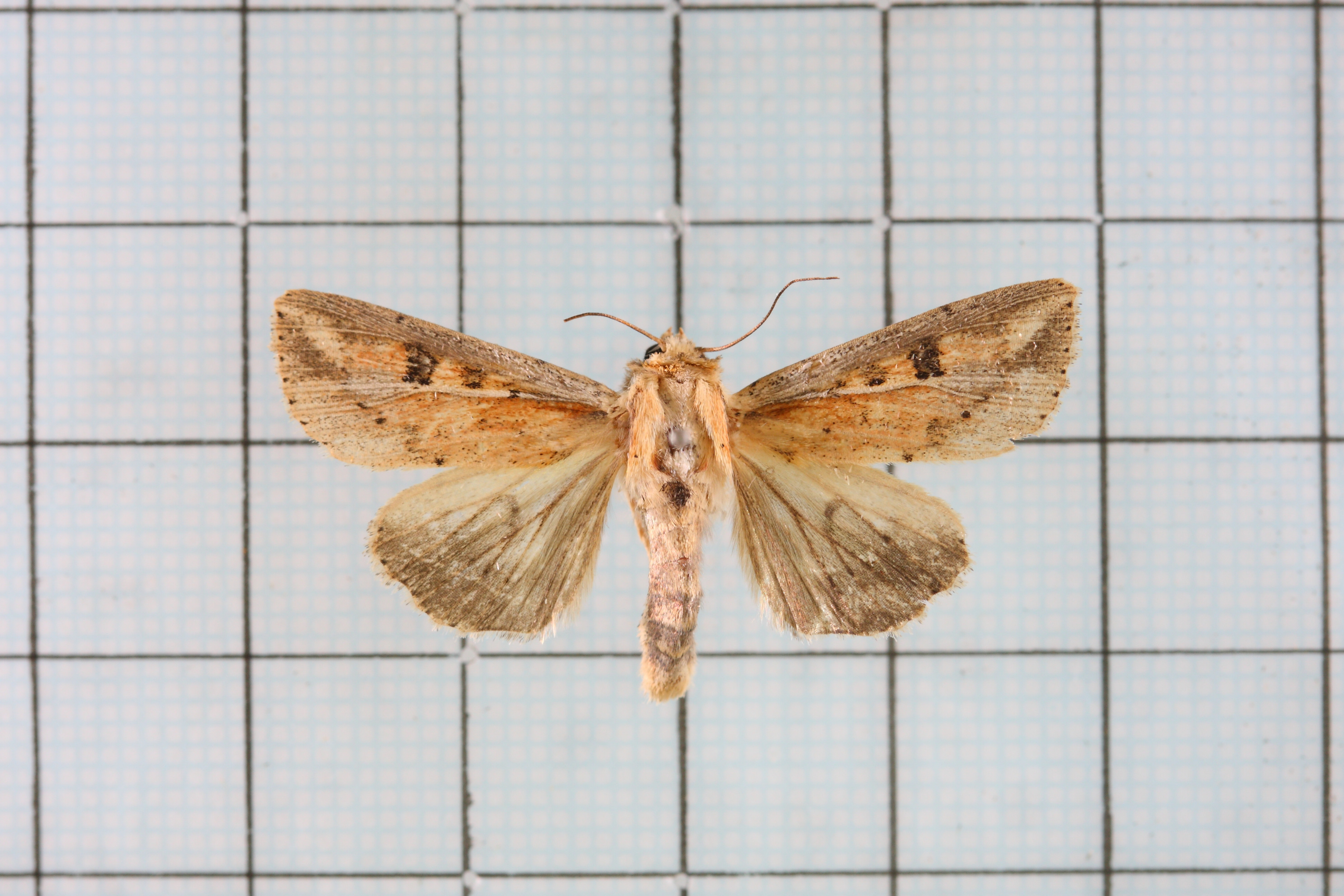
- Mythimna albomarginata rubea

Scientific classification
- Domain: Eukaryota
- Kingdom: Animalia
- Phylum: Arthropoda
- Class: Insecta
- Order: Lepidoptera
- Superfamily: Noctuoidea
- Family: Noctuidae
- Genus: Mythimna
- Species: M. albomarginata

Binomial name
- Mythimna albomarginata (Wileman & South, 1920)

Synonyms
- Cirphis albomarginata Wileman & South, 1920; Cirphis albomarginalis Wileman & West, 1928; Cirphis alboterminalis Wileman & West, 1928; Aletia albomarginata

= Mythimna albomarginata =

Species of moth

Mythimna albomarginata is a moth in the family Noctuidae. It is found in the Philippines, Borneo, Java and Taiwan.

== Subspecies ==
- Mythimna albomarginata albomarginata
- Mythimna albomarginata rubea Yoshimatsu, 1994 (Taiwan)
