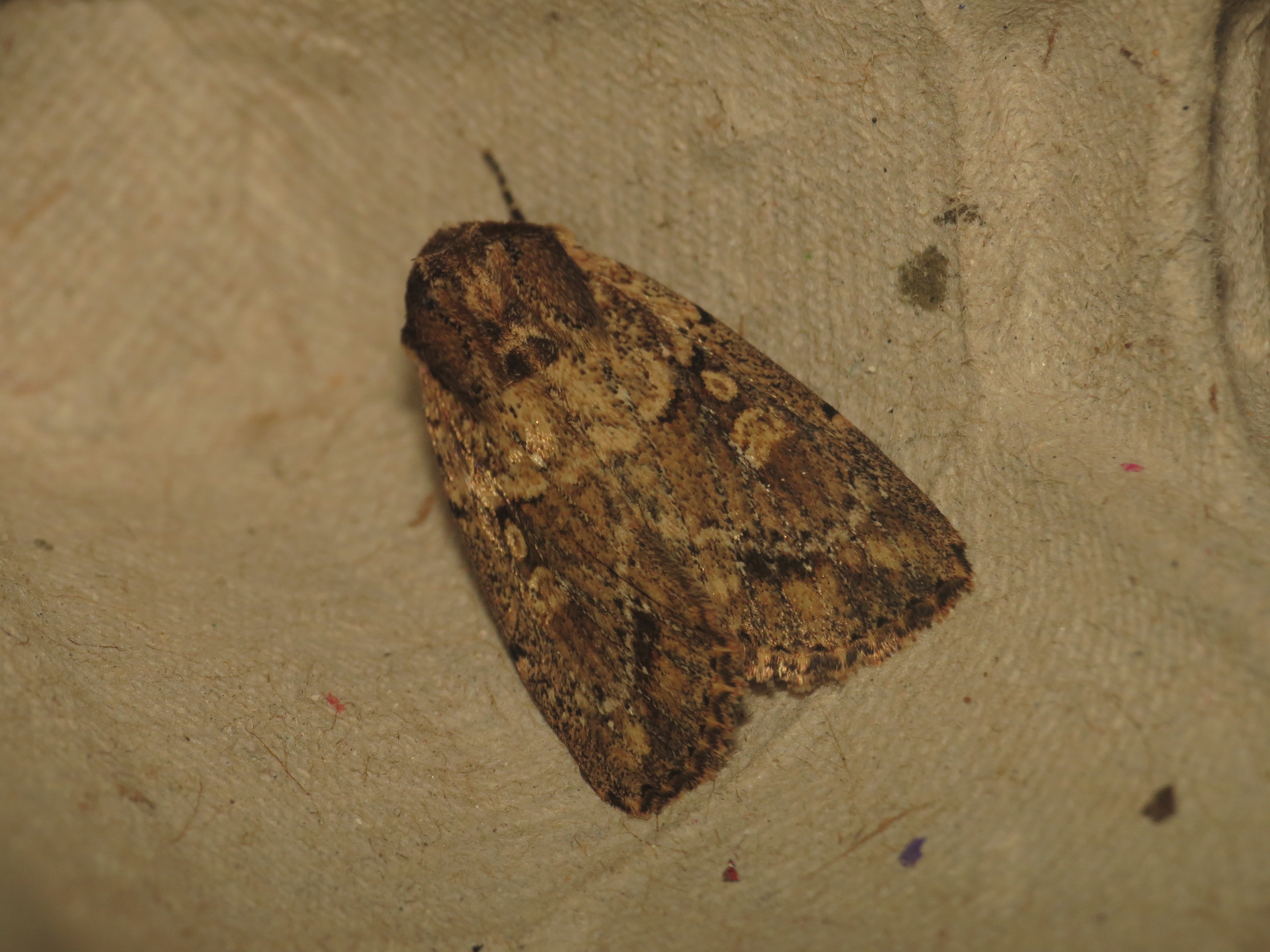

Scientific classification
- Kingdom: Animalia
- Phylum: Arthropoda
- Clade: Pancrustacea
- Class: Insecta
- Order: Lepidoptera
- Superfamily: Noctuoidea
- Family: Noctuidae
- Genus: Mythimna
- Species: M. reversa

Binomial name
- Mythimna reversa (Moore, 1884)

Synonyms
- Hypopteridia reversa Moore, 1884; Aletia reversa Moore, 1884

= Mythimna reversa =

Species of moth

Mythimna reversa is a moth of the family Noctuidae first described by Frederic Moore in 1884. It is found in the Indian subregion, Sri Lanka, Borneo, the Philippines, Hong Kong, Malaysia and Australia.

Adult wingspan is 4 cm. Forewings pinkish brown with patterned dark lines. A pale line runs from the wingtip to near the middle of the hindmargin. Reniform and orbicular distinctly paler. Hindwings pale grey with darker margins. Larval food plants include various grasses such as Paspalum.

== Gallery ==
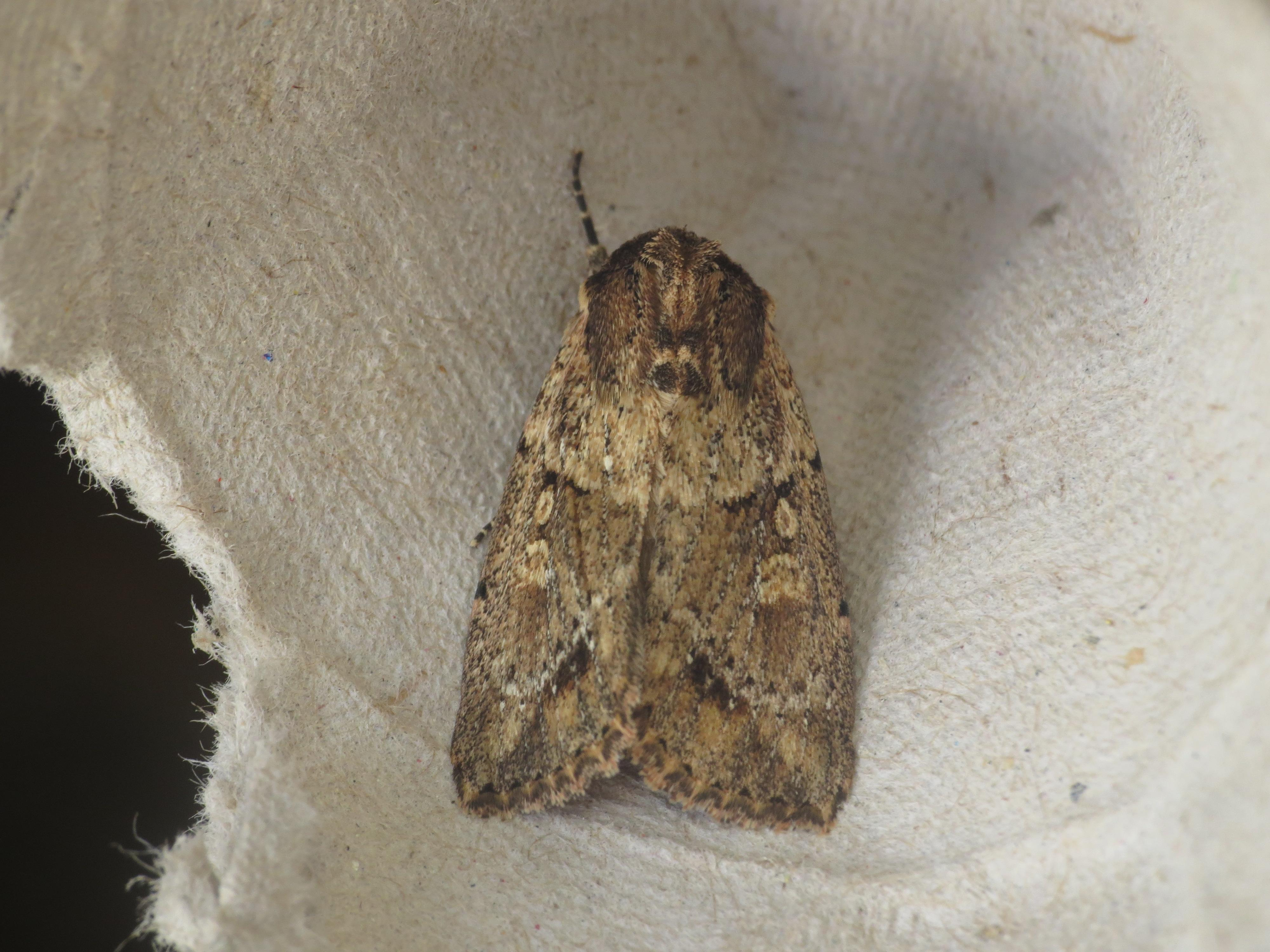

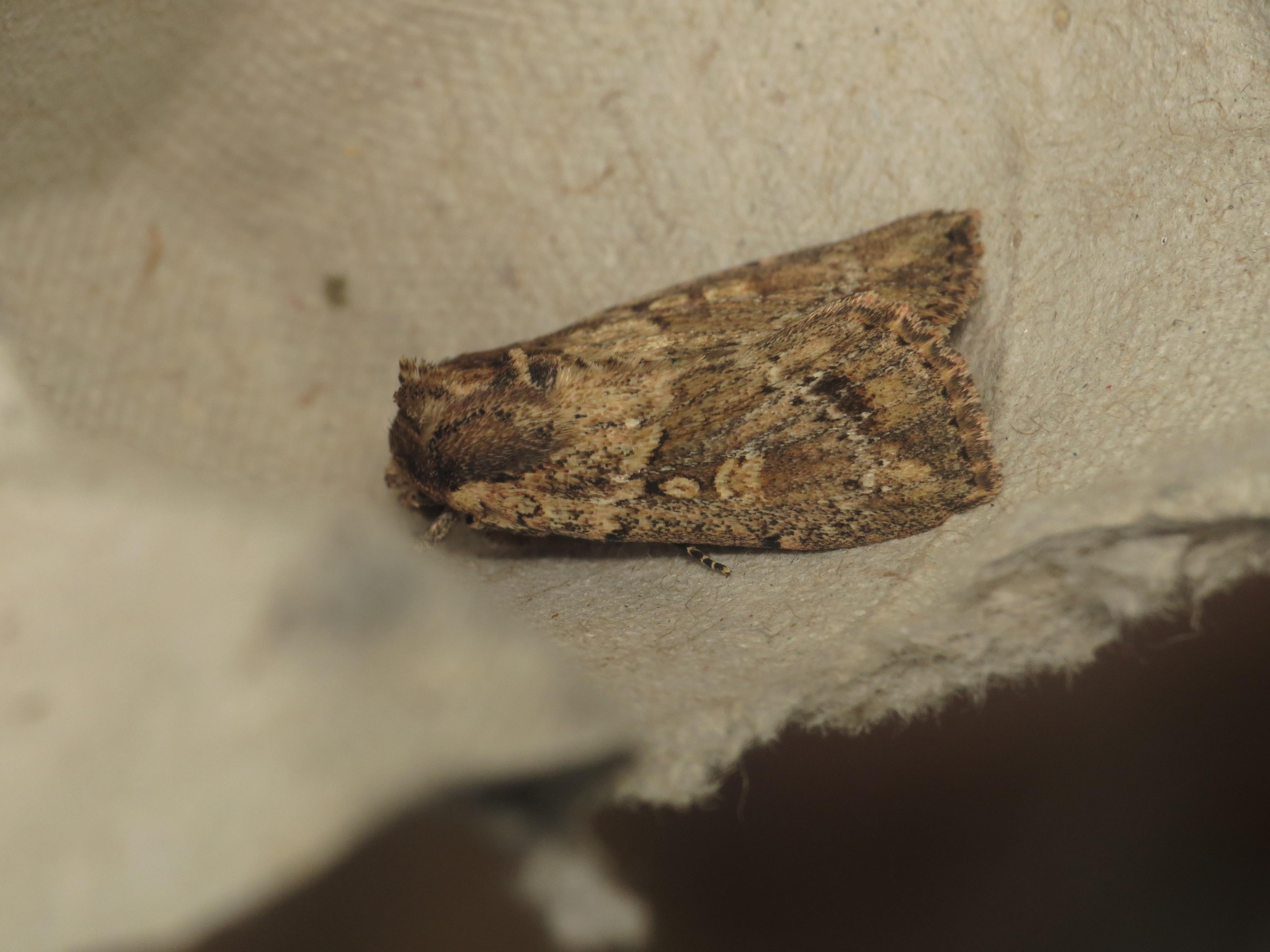
