= Mythimna borbonensis =

Scientific classification
- Kingdom: Animalia
- Phylum: Arthropoda
- Clade: Pancrustacea
- Class: Insecta
- Order: Lepidoptera
- Superfamily: Noctuoidea
- Family: Noctuidae
- Genus: Mythimna
- Species: M. borbonensis

Binomial name
- Mythimna borbonensis (Guillermet, 1996)

Synonyms
- Mythimna mauritiusi Hreblay, 1998

Species of moth

Mythimna borbonensis is a moth in the family Noctuidae. It is found in Réunion and Mauritius.

The length of its forewings is approx. 15–16 mm.
