= Mythimna consanguis =

Scientific classification
- Kingdom: Animalia
- Phylum: Arthropoda
- Clade: Pancrustacea
- Class: Insecta
- Order: Lepidoptera
- Superfamily: Noctuoidea
- Family: Noctuidae
- Genus: Mythimna
- Species: M. consanguis

Binomial name
- Mythimna consanguis (Guenée, 1852)

Synonyms
- Hadena consanguis Guenée, 1852; Aletia consanguis Guenée, 1852

Species of moth

Mythimna consanguis is a moth of the family Noctuidae first described by Achille Guenée in 1852. It is found in Sri Lanka, India, Korea, Indonesia and Australia.

Adult wingspan is 3 cm. Forewings brownish with patterned dark lines. A dark area is found near the middle. Hindwings white with darker margins.
