= Mythimna amblycasis =

Scientific classification
- Kingdom: Animalia
- Phylum: Arthropoda
- Class: Insecta
- Order: Lepidoptera
- Superfamily: Noctuoidea
- Family: Noctuidae
- Genus: Mythimna
- Species: M. amblycasis

Binomial name
- Mythimna amblycasis (Meyrick, 1899)

Synonyms
- Pseudaletia amblycasis (Meyrick, 1899); Leucania amblycasis Meyrick, 1899; Cirphis amblycasis; Hyphilare amblycasis; Aletia amblycasis

Species of moth

Mythimna amblycasis is a moth of the family Noctuidae. It was first described by Edward Meyrick in 1899. It is endemic to the Hawaiian islands of Kauai, Oahu, Molokai, Maui, Lanai and Hawaii.
