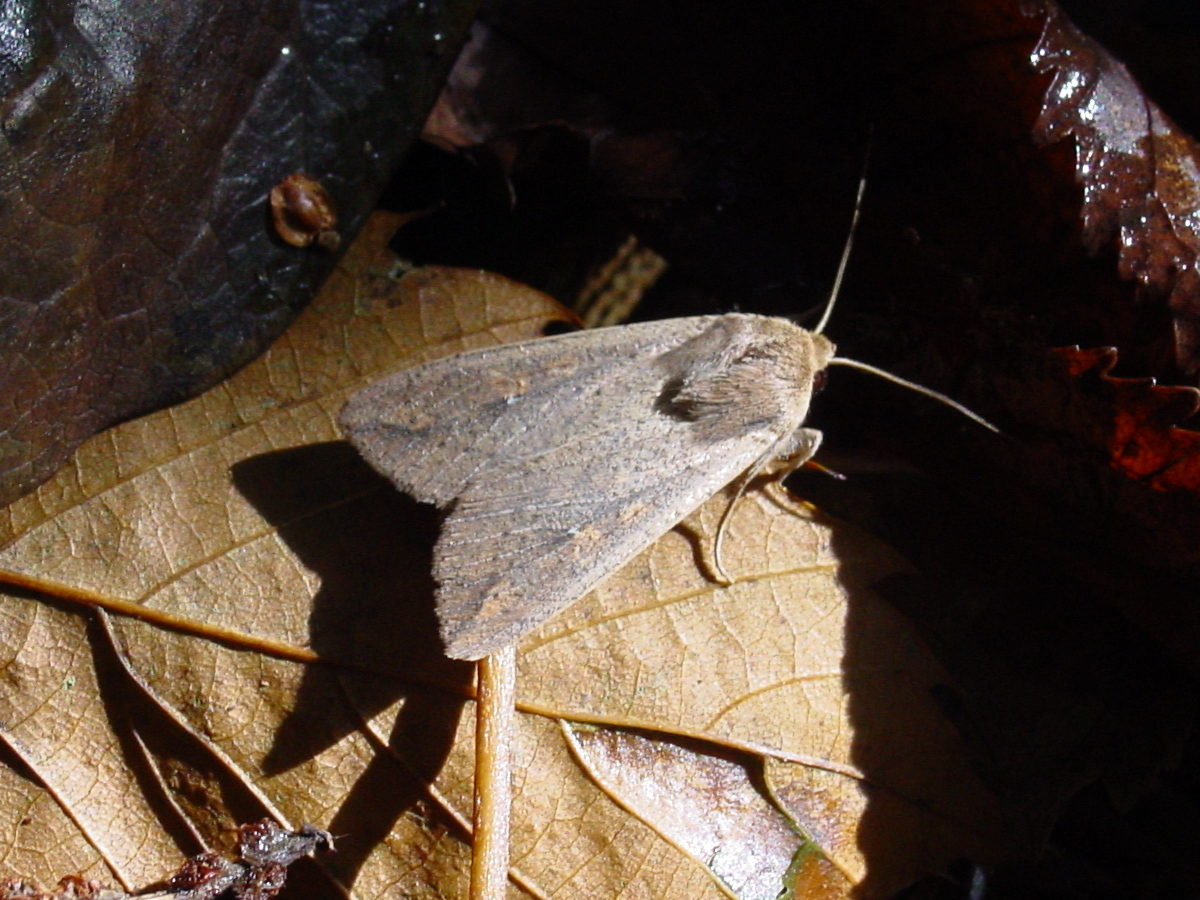
- Mythimna unipuncta

Scientific classification
- Kingdom: Animalia
- Phylum: Arthropoda
- Class: Insecta
- Order: Lepidoptera
- Superfamily: Noctuoidea
- Family: Noctuidae
- Tribe: Leucaniini
- Genus: Mythimna; Ochsenheimer, 1816

Synonyms
- List: Aletia Hübner, 1821; Hyperiodes Warren, 1910; Mithimna Sodoffsky, 1837; Mythimnia; Philostola Billbery, 1820

= Mythimna (moth) =

Genus of moths

Mythimna is a genus of moths in the family Noctuidae described by Ferdinand Ochsenheimer in 1816.

== Species ==
The following species are recognised in the genus Mythimna:

- Mythimna abdita Hreblay & Yoshimatsu, 1998
- Mythimna abiadensis Strand, 1915
- Mythimna acontosema Turner, 1903
- Mythimna acrapex Hampson, 1905
- Mythimna acurata Philpott, 1917
- Mythimna acutangulata Gaede, 1916
- Mythimna adultera Schaus, 1894
- Mythimna aedesiusi Rougeot & Laporte, 1983
- Mythimna aenictopa Fletcher, 1961
- Mythimna albicosta
- Mythimna albimacula Gaede, 1916
- Mythimna albipuncta (Denis & Schiffermüller) 1775 – white-point
- Mythimna albipuncta Gaede, 1916
- Mythimna albiradiosa Eversmann, 1852
- Mythimna albistriga Maassen, 1890
- Mythimna albiviata Hampson, 1913
- Mythimna albivitta Hampson, 1891
- Mythimna albomarginata (Wileman & South, 1920)
- Mythimna alboradiata Hampson, 1905
- Mythimna albostriata Hreblay & Yoshimatsu, 1998
- Mythimna albovenosa Hreblay, 1999
- Mythimna algirica Oberthür, 1918
- Mythimna alopecuri Boisduval, 1840
- Mythimna altiphila Hreblay & Legrain, 1996
- Mythimna amblycasis Meyrick, 1899
- Mythimna amens Guenée, 1852
- Mythimna amlaki Laporte, 1984
- Mythimna anderreggii Boisduval, 1840
- Mythimna angustipennis Saalmüller, 1891
- Mythimna ankaratra Rungs, 1955
- Mythimna anthracoscelis Boursin, 1962
- Mythimna apparata Wallengren, 1875
- Mythimna arcuata Berio, 1970
- Mythimna arcupunctata Maassen, 1890
- Mythimna argentata Hreblay & Yoshimatsu, 1998
- Mythimna argentea Yoshimatsu, 1994
- Mythimna argentifera Hreblay, 1998
- Mythimna argentivena Calora, 1966
- Mythimna arizanensis Wileman, 1915
- Mythimna atrata Remm & Viidalepp, 1979
- Mythimna atrimacula Hampson, 1902
- Mythimna atrinota Hampson, 1905
- Mythimna atrisignata Hampson, 1918
- Mythimna atritorna Hampson, 1911
- Mythimna aurotrigoni Hreblay & Yoshimatsu, 1998
- Mythimna badia Maassen, 1890
- Mythimna bani Sugi, 1977
- Mythimna barberai Berio, 1987
- Mythimna bicolorata Plante, 1992
- Mythimna bicristata Berio, 1939
- Mythimna bifasciata Moore, 1888
- Mythimna biforis Draudt, 1924
- Mythimna bilineata Hampson, 1905
- Mythimna binigrata Warren, 1912
- Mythimna bipunctata (Strand, 1917)
- Mythimna biscornuta Hreblay, Legrain & Yoshimatsu, 1998
- Mythimna bisetulata Berio, 1940
- Mythimna bistrigata Moore, 1881
- Mythimna biundulata Motschulsky, 1860
- Mythimna borbonensis Guillermet, 1996
- Mythimna borneana Yoshimatsu, 1994
- Mythimna brandti Boursin, 1963
- Mythimna brantsii Snellen, 1872
- Mythimna breciva Hreblay & Legrain, 1998
- Mythimna brunneicoccinea Calora, 1966
- Mythimna byssina (Swinhoe, 1886)
- Mythimna caelebs Grünberg, 1910
- Mythimna cameroni Hreblay, 1998
- Mythimna cana Hampson, 1891
- Mythimna carminata Hampson, 1918
- Mythimna carnea Draudt, 1924
- Mythimna celebina Hreblay, 1998
- Mythimna changi Sugi, 1992
- Mythimna chejela Schaus, 1921
- Mythimna chiangmai Hreblay & Yoshimatsu
- Mythimna cholica Dyar, 1919
- Mythimna chosenicola Bryk, 1948
- Mythimna cinereicollis Walker, 1858
- Mythimna circulus Saalmüller, 1880
- Mythimna citrinotata (Hampson, 1905)
- Mythimna clara Draudt, 1924
- Mythimna clarescens Möschler, 1890
- Mythimna clarior Hreblay, 1993
- Mythimna clavifera Hampson, 1907
- Mythimna colorata Dognin, 1914
- Mythimna combinata Walker, 1857
- Mythimna compta (Moore, 1881)
- Mythimna confluens Bethune-Baker, 1909
- Mythimna congrua Hübner
- Mythimna conigera (Denis & Schiffermüller) 1775 – brown-line bright-eye
- Mythimna consanguis Guenée, 1852
- Mythimna consimilis (Moore, 1881)
- Mythimna convecta Walker, 1857 – common armyworm
- Mythimna conversa Hreblay & Yoshimatsu, 1998
- Mythimna cooperi Schaus, 1923
- Mythimna corax Krüger, 2005
- Mythimna coreana Matsumura, 1926
- Mythimna corrugata Hampson, 1894
- Mythimna cruegeri Butler, 1886
- Mythimna cryptargyrea Bethune-Baker, 1905
- Mythimna cuneilinea Draudt, 1950
- Mythimna cuneolata Calora, 1966
- Mythimna cunyada Franclemont, 1951
- Mythimna curvata Leech, 1900
- Mythimna daemona Hreblay & Legrain, 1996
- Mythimna dasuta Hampson, 1905
- Mythimna dasycnema Turner, 1912
- Mythimna decisissima Walker, 1865
- Mythimna denticula Hampson, 1893
- Mythimna deserticola Bartel, 1902
- Mythimna dharma Moore, 1881
- Mythimna diagramma
- Mythimna diatrecta Butler, 1886
- Mythimna diopis Hampson, 1905
- Mythimna disciliena Draudt, 1950
- Mythimna discilinea Draudt, 1950
- Mythimna distincta Moore, 1881
- Mythimna divergens Butler, 1878
- Mythimna duplex Rungs, 1955
- Mythimna elisa Berio, 1962
- Mythimna ensata Yoshimatsu, 1998
- Mythimna epieixelus Rothschild, 1920
- Mythimna evoei Laporte, 1974
- Mythimna exclamans Berio, 1973
- Mythimna explusa Hreblay, 1996
- Mythimna exsanguis (Guenée, 1852)
- Mythimna eyre Schaus, 1938
- Mythimna ezrani Schaus, 1938
- Mythimna fagani Schaus, 1938
- Mythimna falklandica Butler, 1893
- Mythimna fallaciosa Rungs, 1955
- Mythimna fasciata Moore, 1881
- Mythimna favicolor (Barrett, 1896) – Mathew's wainscot
- Mythimna ferrago Fabricius, 1787 – clay
- Mythimna ferrilinea Leech, 1900
- Mythimna fissifascia Hampson, 1907
- Mythimna flavalba Berio, 1970
- Mythimna flavostigma Bremer, 1861
- Mythimna foranea Draudt, 1950
- Mythimna formosana (Butler, 1880)
- Mythimna formosicola Yoshimatsu, 1994
- Mythimna franclemonti Calora, 1966
- Mythimna fraterna Moore, 1888
- Mythimna funerea Philpott, 1927
- Mythimna furcifera Moore, 1882
- Mythimna germanae Laporte, 1991
- Mythimna glaciata Yoshimatsu, 1998
- Mythimna godavariensis Yoshimoto, 1992
- Mythimna goniosigma Hampson, 1905
- Mythimna graditornalis Berio, 1970
- Mythimna grammadora Dyar
- Mythimna grandis Butler, 1878
- Mythimna grata Hreblay, 1996
- Mythimna griseofasciata Moore, 1881
- Mythimna guanyuana Chang, 1991
- Mythimna guascana Schaus, 1938
- Mythimna hackeri Hreblay & Yoshimatsu, 1996
- Mythimna hamata Wallengren, 1856
- Mythimna hamifera (Walker, 1862)
- Mythimna hampsoni Schaus, 1940
- Mythimna hannemanni Yoshimatsu, 1991
- Mythimna hartii Howes, 1914
- Mythimna haywardi Köhler, 1947
- Mythimna heimi Rungs, 1955
- Mythimna hildrani Schaus, 1938
- Mythimna hirashimai Yoshimatsu, 1994
- Mythimna honeyi Yoshimatsu, 1990
- Mythimna hypocapna de Joannis, 1932
- Mythimna hypophaea Hampson, 1905
- Mythimna idisana Franclemont, 1951
- Mythimna ignifera Hreblay, 1998
- Mythimna ignita Hampson, 1905
- Mythimna ignorata Hreblay & Yoshimatsu, 1998
- Mythimna ignota Hreblay
- Mythimna imbellis Staudinger, 1888
- Mythimna impuncta Guenée, 1852
- Mythimna impura Hübner, 1808 – smoky wainscot
- Mythimna inanis Oberthür, 1880
- Mythimna incana Snellen, 1880
- Mythimna incompleta Berio, 1970
- Mythimna inconspicua Herrich-Schäffer, 1868
- Mythimna inframicans (Hampson, 1893)
- Mythimna infrargyrea Saalmüller, 1891
- Mythimna inornata Leech, 1889
- Mythimna insularis Butler, 1880
- Mythimna insulicola Guenée, 1852
- Mythimna interciliata Hampson, 1902
- Mythimna intermediata Yoshimatsu, 1990
- Mythimna internata Möschler, 1884
- Mythimna intertexta Chang, 1991
- Mythimna intolerabilis Hreblay, 1993
- Mythimna iodochra Sugi, 1982
- Mythimna irrorata Moore, 1888
- Mythimna jaliscana Schaus, 1898
- Mythimna javacorna Hreblay & Legrain, 1998
- Mythimna kambaitiana Berio, 1973
- Mythimna kerala Hreblay & Legrain, 1999
- Mythimna khasiensis Hreblay & Legrain, 1998
- Mythimna l-album Linnaeus, 1767 – L-album wainscot
- Mythimna lacteola Christoph, 1893
- Mythimna lacticinia Dognin, 1914
- Mythimna laevusta Berio, 1955
- Mythimna languida Walker, 1858
- Mythimna larga Hreblay, 1998
- Mythimna larseni Wiltshire, 1985
- Mythimna lasiomera Hampson, 1905
- Mythimna laxa Hreblay & Yoshimatsu, 1996
- Mythimna legraini Plante, 1922
- Mythimna lepida Hreblay, Legrain & Yoshimatsu, 1996
- Mythimna leucogramma Hampson, 1905
- Mythimna leucophlebia Hampson, 1918
- Mythimna leucosphaenia Bethune-Baker, 1905
- Mythimna leucosphenia Bethune-Baker, 1905
- Mythimna leucosta Lower, 1902
- Mythimna lewinii Butler, 1886
- Mythimna liebherri Yoshimatsu, 1991
- Mythimna lilloana (Köhler, 1947)
- Mythimna lindigi Felder, 1874
- Mythimna lineatipes Moore, 1881
- Mythimna lipara Wileman & West, 1928
- Mythimna lishana Chang, 1991
- Mythimna litoralis Curtis, 1827 – shore wainscot
- Mythimna longivittata Berio, 1940
- Mythimna lucbana Calora, 1966
- Mythimna lucida Yoshimatsu & Hreblay, 1996
- Mythimna macellaria Draudt, 1924
- Mythimna macoya Schaus, 1921
- Mythimna macrosaris Meyrick, 1899
- Mythimna madensis Berio, 1955
- Mythimna mamohau Krüger, 2005
- Mythimna manopi Hreblay, 1998
- Mythimna martoni Yoshimatsu & Legrain, 2001
- Mythimna maxima Hreblay, 1998
- Mythimna mediana Moore, 1881
- Mythimna mediofusca Hampson, 1891
- Mythimna mediolacteata Berio, 1941
- Mythimna melania Staudinger, 1889
- Mythimna melianoides (Möschler, 1884)
- Mythimna mesotrosta Püngeler, 1900
- Mythimna metaphaea Hampson, 1905
- Mythimna metasarca Hampson, 1907
- Mythimna miasticta Hampson, 1918
- Mythimna microgonia Hampson, 1905
- Mythimna micropis Hampson, 1905
- Mythimna microsticha Hampson, 1905
- Mythimna minorata Smith, 1894
- Mythimna mocoides Dognin, 1897
- Mythimna modesta Moore, 1881
- Mythimna moinieri Plante, 1993
- Mythimna mollis Berio, 1974
- Mythimna monticola Sugi, 1958
- Mythimna montigena Hreblay & Legrain, 1996
- Mythimna moorei (Swinhoe, 1902)
- Mythimna moriutii Yoshimatsu & Hreblay, 1996
- Mythimna mouai Orhant, 2002
- Mythimna multipunctata Druce, 1889
- Mythimna multipunctata Hampson, 1918
- Mythimna munnari Hreblay, 1999
- Mythimna murcida Wallengren, 1875
- Mythimna nainica Moore, 1881
- Mythimna naumanni Yoshimatsu & Hreblay, 1998
- Mythimna nebulosa Hampson, 1902
- Mythimna negrottoi Berio, 1940
- Mythimna nepalina Hreblay & Yoshimatsu, 1996
- Mythimna nepos Leech, 1900
- Mythimna nigrilinea Leech, 1889
- Mythimna nigrisparsa Hampson, 1902
- Mythimna niveilinea Schaus, 1894
- Mythimna noacki Boursin, 1967
- Mythimna obscura Moore, 1882
- Mythimna obscurographa Hreblay, 1999
- Mythimna opaca Staudinger, 1900
- Mythimna opada Calora, 1966
- Mythimna opalisans Draudt, 1924
- Mythimna operosa Saalmüller, 1891
- Mythimna osseogrisea Berio, 1973
- Mythimna oxygala Grote, 1881
- Mythimna pakdala Calora, 1966
- Mythimna pallens Linnaeus, 1758 – common wainscot
- Mythimna pallidicosta Hampson, 1894
- Mythimna panarista Fletcher, 1963
- Mythimna pastea Hampson, 1905
- Mythimna pastearis Draudt, 1950
- Mythimna pastellina Hreblay & Legrain, 1996
- Mythimna pastellinia Hreblay & Legrain, 1996
- Mythimna patrizzii Berio, 1935
- Mythimna percisa Moore, 1888
- Mythimna perirrorata Warren, 1913
- Mythimna persecta (Hampson, 1905)
- Mythimna perspecta Hampson, 1905
- Mythimna perstriata Hampson, 1909
- Mythimna perstriata Sugi, 1982
- Mythimna perstrigata Dyar, 1910
- Mythimna petulans Draudt, 1928
- Mythimna phaea Hampson, 1902
- Mythimna phaeochroa Hampson, 1905
- Mythimna phaeoneura Hampson, 1913
- Mythimna phaeopasta Hampson, 1907
- Mythimna phlebitis Püngeler, 1904
- Mythimna pinna Saalmüller, 1891
- Mythimna placida Butler, 1878
- Mythimna plantei Hreblay & Yoshimatsu, 1995
- Mythimna polystrota Hampson, 1905
- Mythimna prominens Walker, 1856
- Mythimna proxima Leech, 1900
- Mythimna pseudoformosana (Robinson, 1975)
- Mythimna pseudoloreyi
- Mythimna pseudotacuna Berio, 1962
- Mythimna pudorina (Denis & Schiffermüller) 1775 – striped wainscot
- Mythimna pulchra (Snellen)
- Mythimna punctulata Blanchard, 1852
- Mythimna punctulata Wallengren, 1856
- Mythimna purpurpatagis Chang, 1991
- Mythimna pyrastis Hampson, 1905
- Mythimna pyrausta Hampson, 1913
- Mythimna quadricuspidata Wallengren, 1856
- Mythimna quasimodo Hreblay, 1998
- Mythimna radiata (Bremer, 1861)
- Mythimna remota Staudinger, 1899
- Mythimna renimaculata Hreblay & Legrain, 1996
- Mythimna renoui Barbut & Lalanne-Cassou, 2010
- Mythimna respersa Berio, 1974
- Mythimna reticulata Berio, 1962
- Mythimna reversa (Moore, 1884)
- Mythimna rhodopsara Turner, 1911
- Mythimna rhodoptera Hampson, 1905
- Mythimna riparia (Rambur, 1829)
- Mythimna rivorum Guenée, 1852
- Mythimna roraimae Franclemont, 1951
- Mythimna rosea Möschler, 1880
- Mythimna roseivena Draudt, 1924
- Mythimna rosescens Hampson, 1910
- Mythimna rosilineata Köhler, 1947
- Mythimna rubida Hreblay, Legrain & Yoshimatsu, 1996
- Mythimna rubrescens Hampson, 1905
- Mythimna rubrisecta Hampson, 1905
- Mythimna rufescens Gaede, 1916
- Mythimna rufescentalis Poole, 1989
- Mythimna rufidefinita Hampson, 1918
- Mythimna rufipennis Butler, 1878
- Mythimna rufistrigosa Moore, 1881
- Mythimna rufotumata Draudt, 1950
- Mythimna rufulosa Wiltshire, 1986
- Mythimna rushanensis Yoshimatsu, 1994
- Mythimna rutilitincta Hreblay & Yoshimatsu, 1996
- Mythimna salebrosa Butler, 1878
- Mythimna sanguinis Berio, 1962
- Mythimna sarcistis Hampson, 1905
- Mythimna sarcophaea Hampson, 1905
- Mythimna sarcostriga Hampson, 1905
- Mythimna sassanidica Hacker, 1986
- Mythimna saucesa Pinker, 1963
- Mythimna scottii Butler, 1886
- Mythimna secta Herrich-Schäffer, 1868
- Mythimna semicana Pagenstecher, 1900
- Mythimna semicorax Krüger, 2005
- Mythimna senescens Möschler, 1890
- Mythimna separata (Walker, 1865) – northern armyworm
- Mythimna sequax Franclemont, 1951
- Mythimna serradagua Wolff, 1977
- Mythimna serradaguae Wolff, 1977
- Mythimna seteci Dyar, 1914
- Mythimna siamensis Hreblay, 1998
- Mythimna sicula Treitschke, 1835
- Mythimna sigma Draudt, 1950
- Mythimna similissima Hreblay & Yoshimatsu, 1996
- Mythimna simplex Beutelspacher-Baigts, 1984
- Mythimna simplex Leech, 1889
- Mythimna sinensis Hampson, 1909
- Mythimna sinuosa Moore, 1882
- Mythimna snelleni Hreblay, 1996
- Mythimna socorrensis Dognin, 1911
- Mythimna sokotrensis Hreblay, 1996
- Mythimna speciosa Yoshimatsu, 1991
- Mythimna steniptera Hampson, 1905
- Mythimna stolida Leech, 1889
- Mythimna straminea Treitschke, 1825 – southern wainscot
- Mythimna striatella Draudt, 1950
- Mythimna striguscula Dyar, 1913
- Mythimna stueningi Plante, 1993
- Mythimna suavina Hreblay, 1998
- Mythimna subacrapex Berio, 1970
- Mythimna subplacida Sugi, 1977
- Mythimna subrosea Matsumura, 1926
- Mythimna subrubrescens Warren, 1915
- Mythimna subsignata Moore, 1881
- Mythimna substituta (Wallengren, 1875)
- Mythimna tacuna Felder, 1874
- Mythimna taiwana Wileman, 1912
- Mythimna tangala Felder & Rogenhofer, 1874
- Mythimna tengeri Hreblay, 1999
- Mythimna tessellum Draudt, 1950
- Mythimna thailandica Hreblay, 1998
- Mythimna thomasi Hacker, Hreblay & Plante, 1993
- Mythimna tibetensis Hreblay, 1998
- Mythimna tincta Walker, 1858
- Mythimna torpens Guenée, 1852
- Mythimna toumodi Laporte, 1978
- Mythimna transversata Draudt, 1950
- Mythimna tricorna Hreblay, Legrain & Yoshimatsu, 1998
- Mythimna tricuspis Draudt, 1950
- Mythimna tritonia Hampson, 1905
- Mythimna turca Linnaeus, 1761 – double line
- Mythimna uda Guenée, 1852
- Mythimna umbrigera Saalmüller, 1891
- Mythimna uncinatus Gaede, 1916
- Mythimna undina Draudt, 1950
- Mythimna unipuncta (Haworth, 1809) – white-speck
- Mythimna uruma Sugi, 1970
- Mythimna usta Hampson, 1902
- Mythimna ustata Hampson, 1907
- Mythimna v-album Hampson, 1891
- Mythimna velutina Eversmann, 1846
- Mythimna velva Schaus, 1921
- Mythimna vibicosa Turner, 1920
- Mythimna viettei Rungs, 1955
- Mythimna vilis Gaede, 1916
- Mythimna villalobosi Beutelspacher-Baigts, 1984
- Mythimna vitellina Hübner, 1808 – delicate
- Mythimna vittata Hampson, 1891
- Mythimna vuattouxi Laporte, 1973
- Mythimna wulinensis Wu, Ronkay & Fu, 2021
- Mythimna yuennana Draudt, 1950
- Mythimna yukonensis Hampson, 1911
