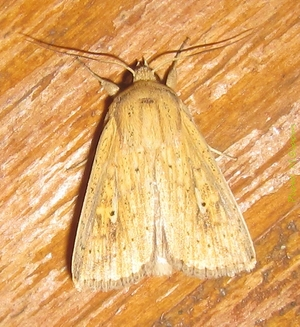

Scientific classification
- Kingdom: Animalia
- Phylum: Arthropoda
- Class: Insecta
- Order: Lepidoptera
- Superfamily: Noctuoidea
- Family: Noctuidae
- Genus: Mythimna
- Species: M. pyrausta

Binomial name
- Mythimna pyrausta (Hampson, 1913)

Synonyms
- Aletia pyrausta; Cyphris pyrausta Hampson, 1913

= Mythimna pyrausta =

Species of moth

Mythimna pyrausta is a species of moth of the family Noctuidae. It is found in most countries of central, southern and eastern Africa, including islands in the Atlantic and Indian Ocean.

It has a length of approx. 15 mm = wingspan 28-30mm.
