= Mythimna dasuta =

Scientific classification
- Kingdom: Animalia
- Phylum: Arthropoda
- Class: Insecta
- Order: Lepidoptera
- Superfamily: Noctuoidea
- Family: Noctuidae
- Genus: Mythimna
- Species: M. dasuta

Binomial name
- Mythimna dasuta (Hampson, 1905)

Synonyms
- Pseudaletia dasuta (Hampson, 1905); Cirphis dasuta Hampson, 1905; Hyphilare dasuta; Aletia dasuta

Species of moth

Mythimna dasuta is a moth of the family Noctuidae. It was first described by George Hampson in 1905. It is endemic to the island of Hawaii.
