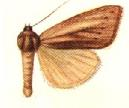

Scientific classification
- Domain: Eukaryota
- Kingdom: Animalia
- Phylum: Arthropoda
- Class: Insecta
- Order: Lepidoptera
- Superfamily: Noctuoidea
- Family: Noctuidae
- Genus: Mythimna
- Species: M. irrorata

Binomial name
- Mythimna irrorata (Moore, 1881)

Synonyms
- Timora irrorata; Masalia irrorata; Axylia irrorata Moore, 1881; Leucania insularis; Timora roseana; Arsiloncha roseana; Heliothis irrorata (Moore, 1881)

= Mythimna irrorata =

Species of moth

Mythimna irrorata is a moth of the family Noctuidae first described by Frederic Moore in 1881. It is found in the north-western parts of the Himalayas and Sri Lanka.

== Description ==
Its wingspan is about 30 mm. Forewings with a broad dark fascia from base to outer margin, or the whole wing except costal area dark. Body ochreous white. Collar fringed with fuscous color. Two black spots found at middle of cell and one at lower angle. There is a double postmedial and single marginal series of dark specks present. Veins of outer area are slightly paler. Hindwings are white, with marginal speck series. Some specimens have a black streak below base of outer median nervure and fuscous subapical triangular patch on outer margin. Cilia fuscous.
