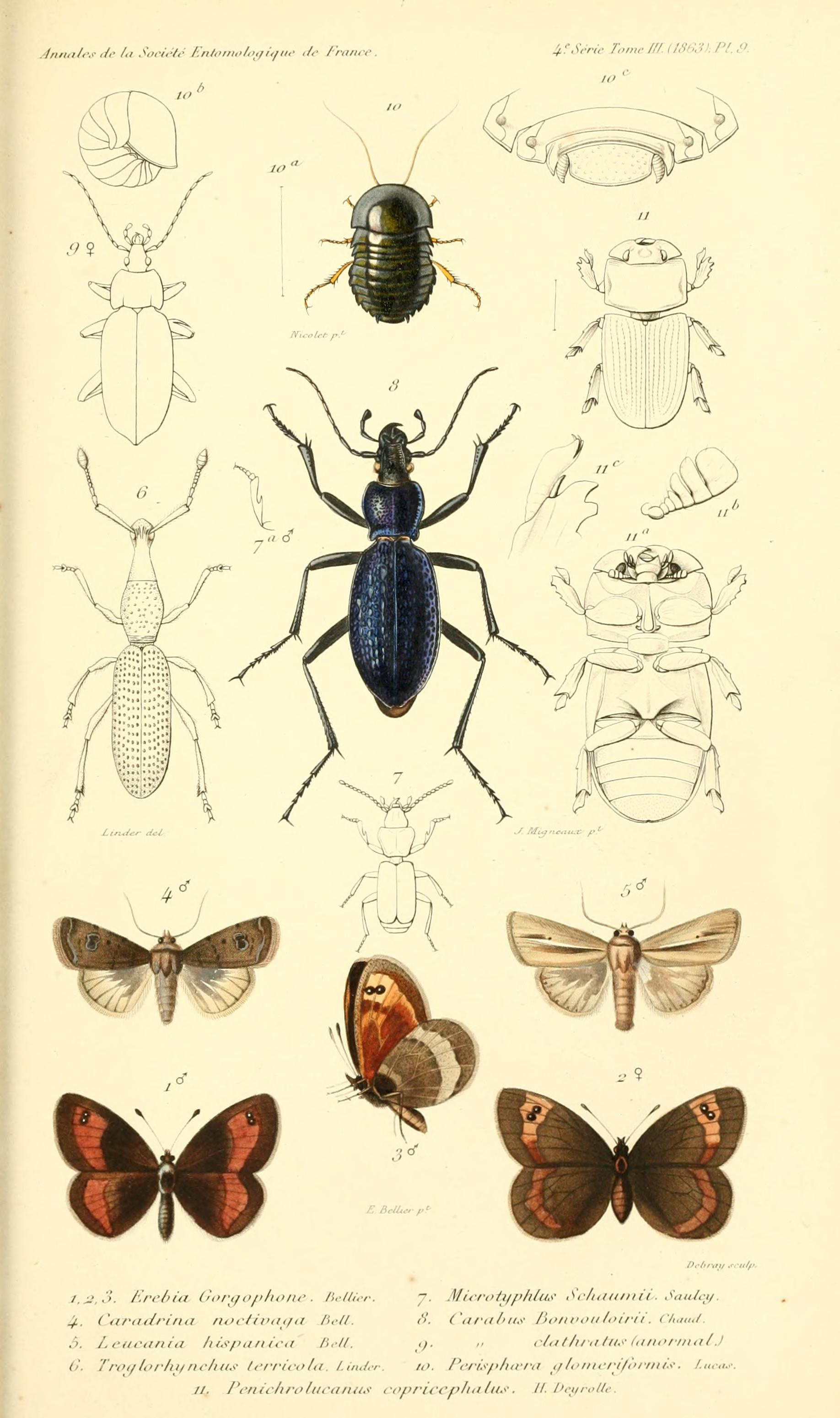
- Figure 5 as the junior synonym Leucania hispanica

Scientific classification
- Kingdom: Animalia
- Phylum: Arthropoda
- Class: Insecta
- Order: Lepidoptera
- Superfamily: Noctuoidea
- Family: Noctuidae
- Genus: Mythimna
- Species: M. prominens

Binomial name
- Mythimna prominens (Walker, 1856)

Synonyms
- Cirphis prominens (Hampson, 1914); Leucania prominens Walker, 1856; Leucania hispanica Bellier, 1863; Leucania tiburtina Turati, 1909; Mythimna provvisoria Berio, 1962

= Mythimna prominens =

Species of moth

Mythimna prominens is a moth of the family Noctuidae. It was described by Francis Walker in 1856. It is found on Malta and in Greece, France, the Iberian Peninsula and Italy. Outside of Europe, it is found in Morocco, the Republic of the Congo, the Democratic Republic of the Congo, Kenya, Réunion, Nigeria, South Africa and Zimbabwe.

This species has a wingspan of 28–36 mm and the larvae feed on Lilium species, including Lilium multiflorum.
