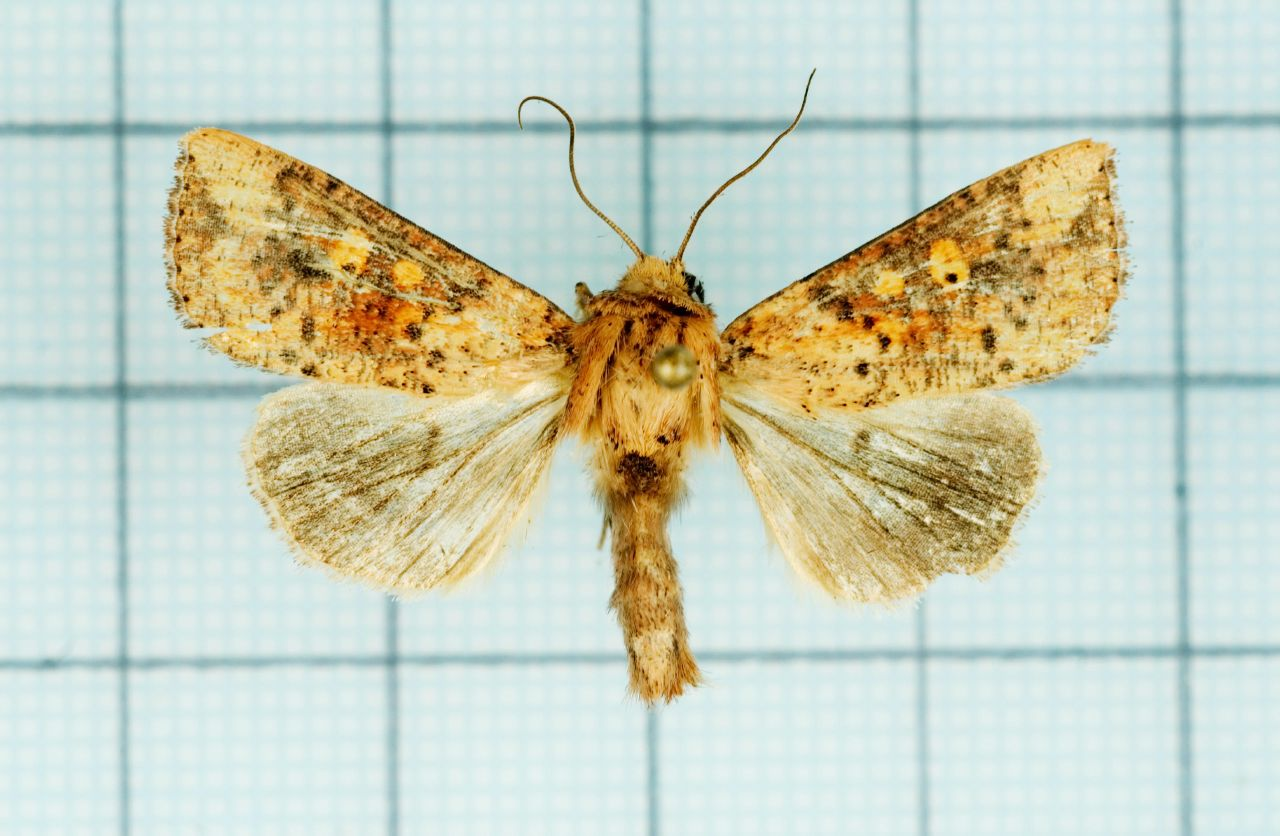

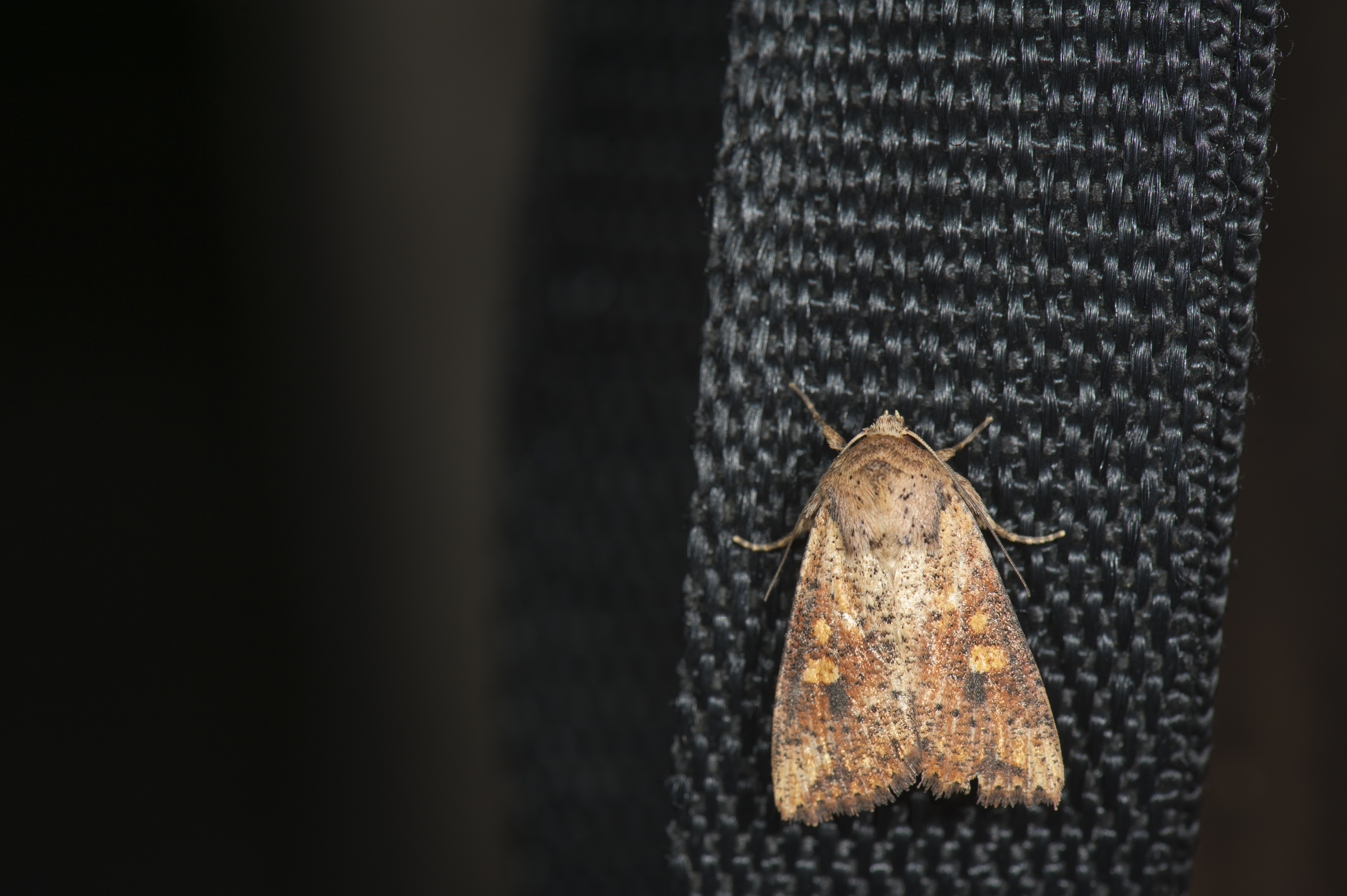

Scientific classification
- Domain: Eukaryota
- Kingdom: Animalia
- Phylum: Arthropoda
- Class: Insecta
- Order: Lepidoptera
- Superfamily: Noctuoidea
- Family: Noctuidae
- Genus: Mythimna
- Species: M. hannemanni

Binomial name
- Mythimna hannemanni (Yoshimatsu, 1991)

Synonyms
- Aletia hannemanni Yoshimatsu, 1991

= Mythimna hannemanni =

Species of moth

Mythimna hannemanni is a moth in the family Noctuidae. It is found in Taiwan.

The length of the forewings is 15.3-16.2 mm.
