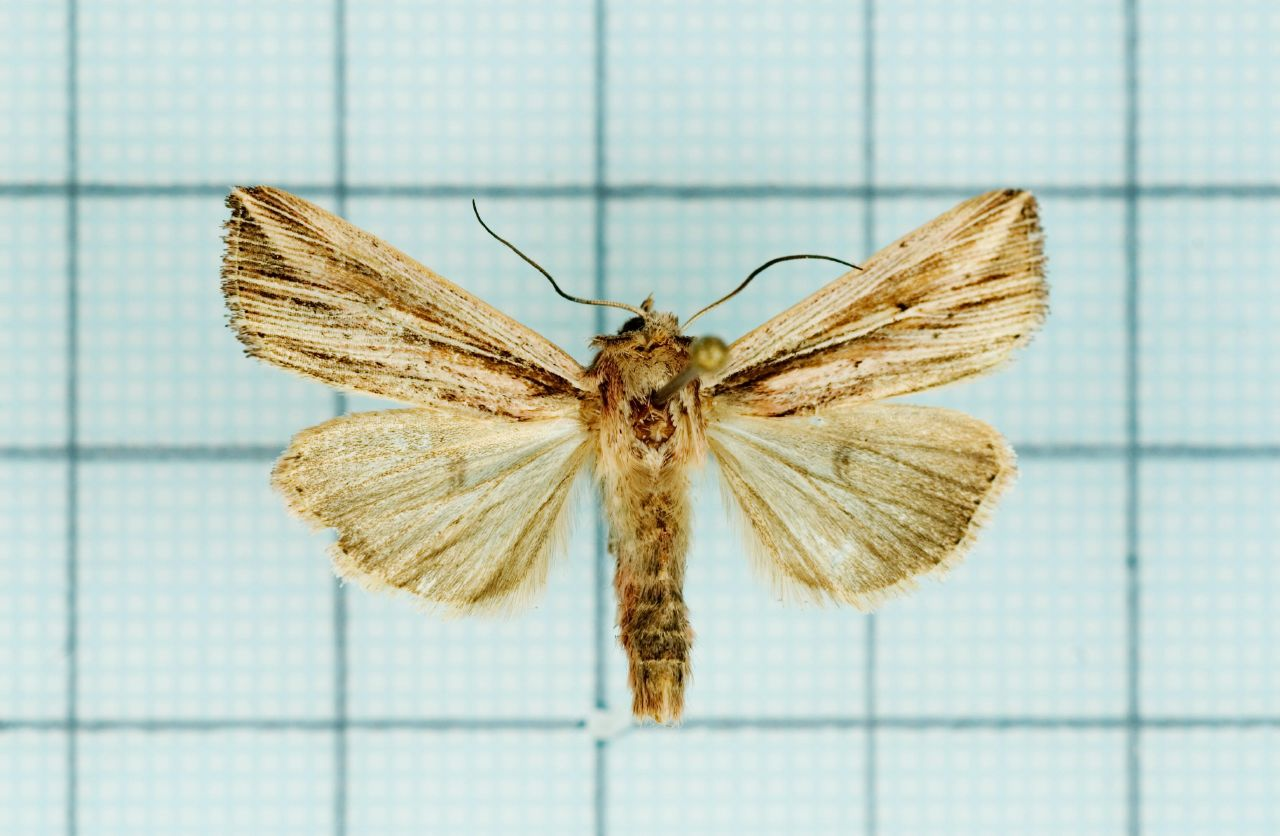

Scientific classification
- Domain: Eukaryota
- Kingdom: Animalia
- Phylum: Arthropoda
- Class: Insecta
- Order: Lepidoptera
- Superfamily: Noctuoidea
- Family: Noctuidae
- Genus: Mythimna
- Species: M. martoni

Binomial name
- Mythimna martoni Yoshimatsu & Legrain, 2001

= Mythimna martoni =

Species of moth

Mythimna martoni is a moth in the family Noctuidae. It is found in Taiwan, China and India.
