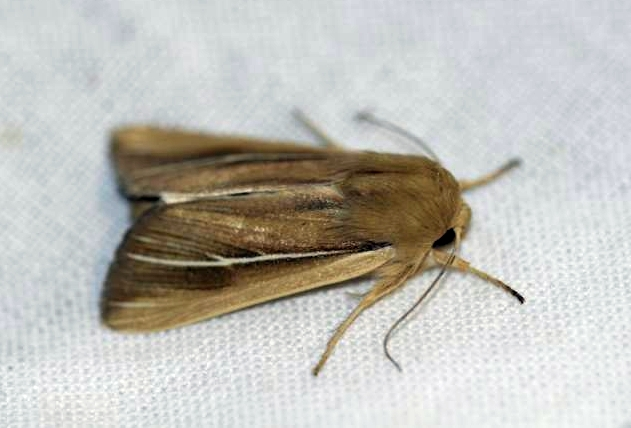

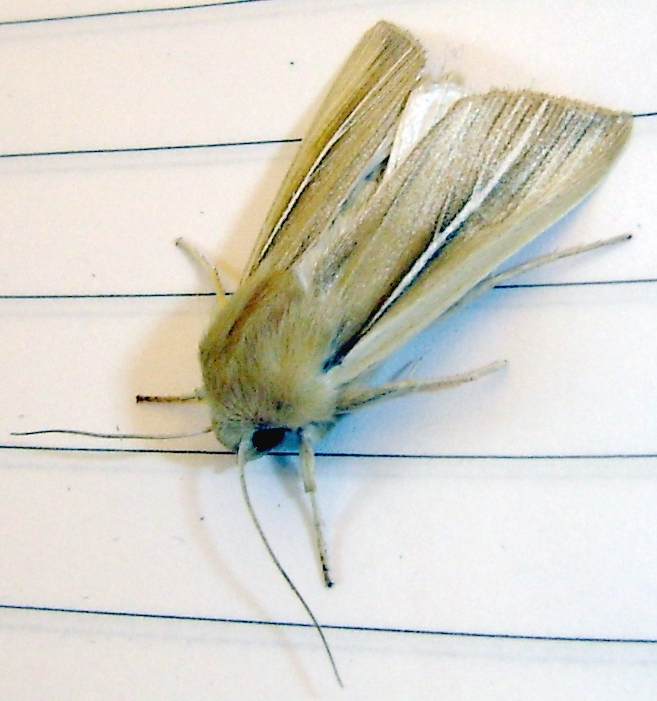

Scientific classification
- Kingdom: Animalia
- Phylum: Arthropoda
- Clade: Pancrustacea
- Class: Insecta
- Order: Lepidoptera
- Superfamily: Noctuoidea
- Family: Noctuidae
- Genus: Mythimna
- Species: M. litoralis

Binomial name
- Mythimna litoralis (Curtis, 1827)

= Mythimna litoralis =

Shore wainscot

Species of moth

Mythimna litoralis, the shore wainscot, is a moth of the family Noctuidae.

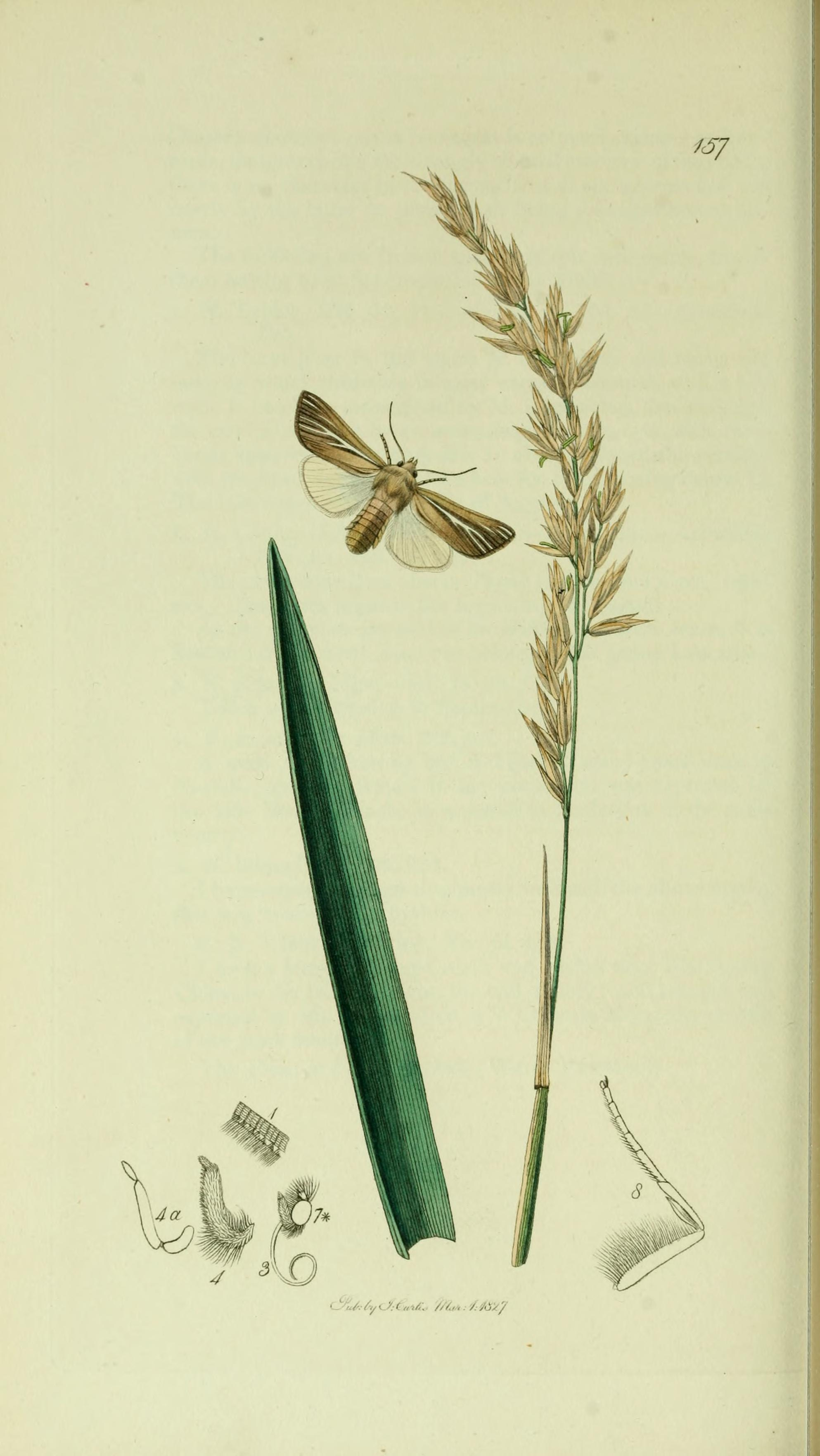
Illustration from John Curtis's British Entomology Volume 5

A strictly coastal species, it is found in Europe and Morocco in areas close to the shore. The wingspan is 36–42 mm. It is an ochre-colored moth having a distinctive white streak bordered with dark fine lines along the length of the forewing.

== Technical description and variation ==
The wingspan is 36–42 mm. Forewing smooth pale ochreous suffused with brown except along costa;median vein white, outlined with fuscous; the nervules towards termen whitish; the terminal interspaces with brown streaks; hindwing pure white. A coast species found in Britain, Denmark, N. Germany, the Netherlands, Belgium, France, and Spain. See also Hacker et al.

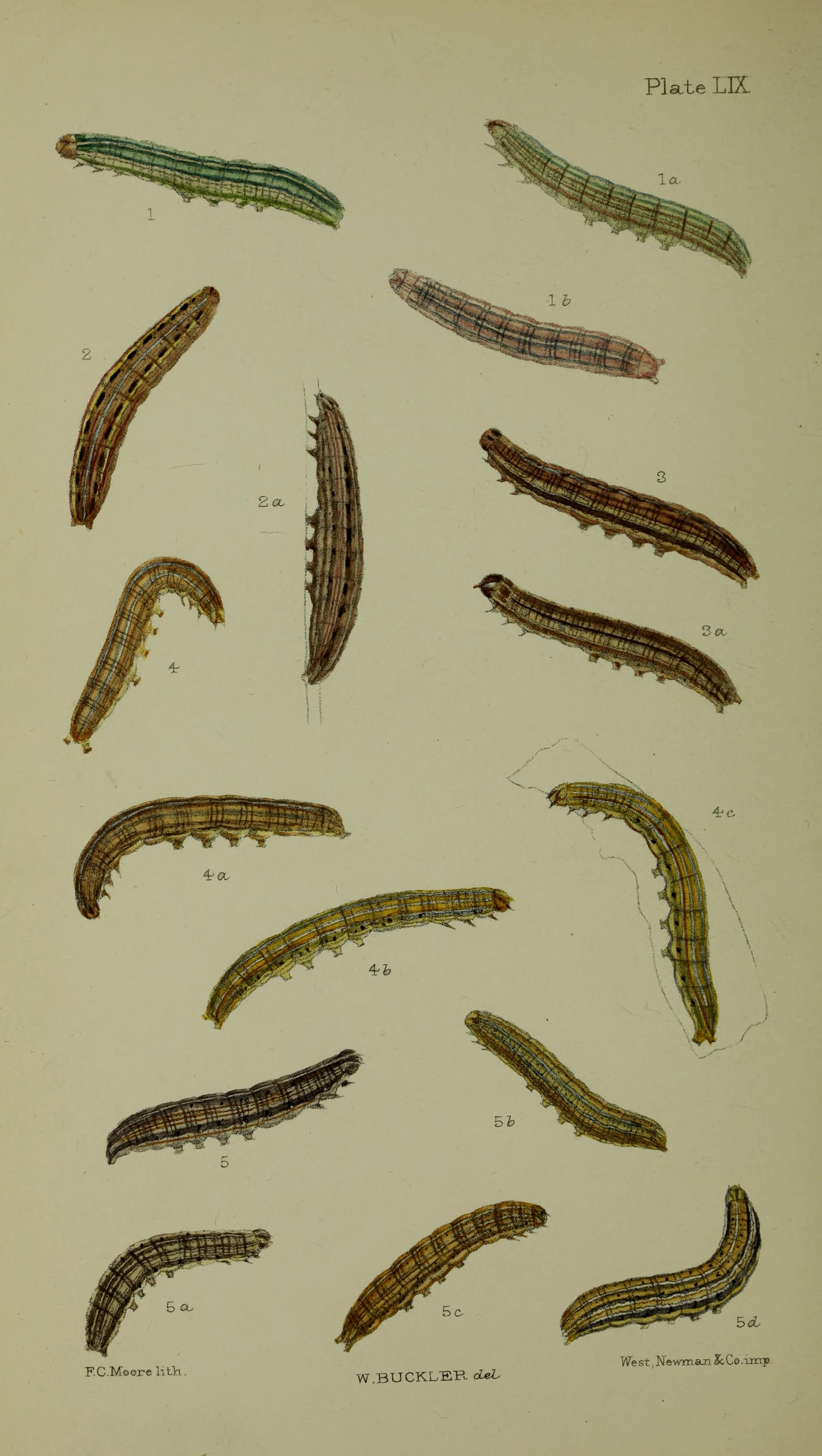
Figs 1, 1a, 1b

Larva reddish yellow; dorsal line fine, pale with dark edges; subdorsal lines blackish; spiracles black on a pale lateral stripe; head and thoracic plate yellowish. The larvae are monophagous, feeding exclusively on marram grass (Ammophila arenaria) leaves, a plant that grows on dunes along the shoreline.
