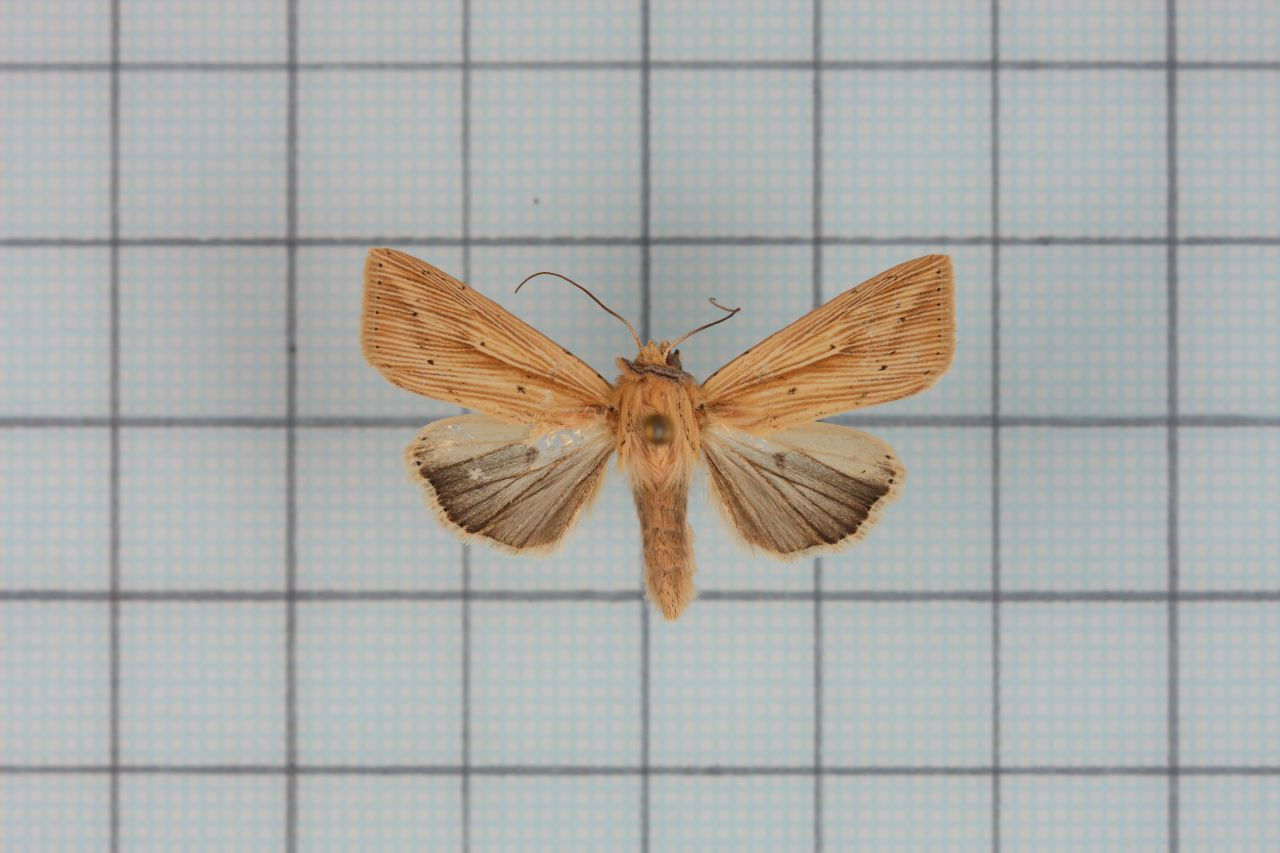

Scientific classification
- Kingdom: Animalia
- Phylum: Arthropoda
- Clade: Pancrustacea
- Class: Insecta
- Order: Lepidoptera
- Superfamily: Noctuoidea
- Family: Noctuidae
- Genus: Mythimna
- Species: M. changi

Binomial name
- Mythimna changi (Sugi, 1992)

Synonyms
- Aletia aureola Chang, 1991

= Mythimna changi =

Species of moth

Mythimna changi is a moth in the family Noctuidae. It is found in Taiwan.
