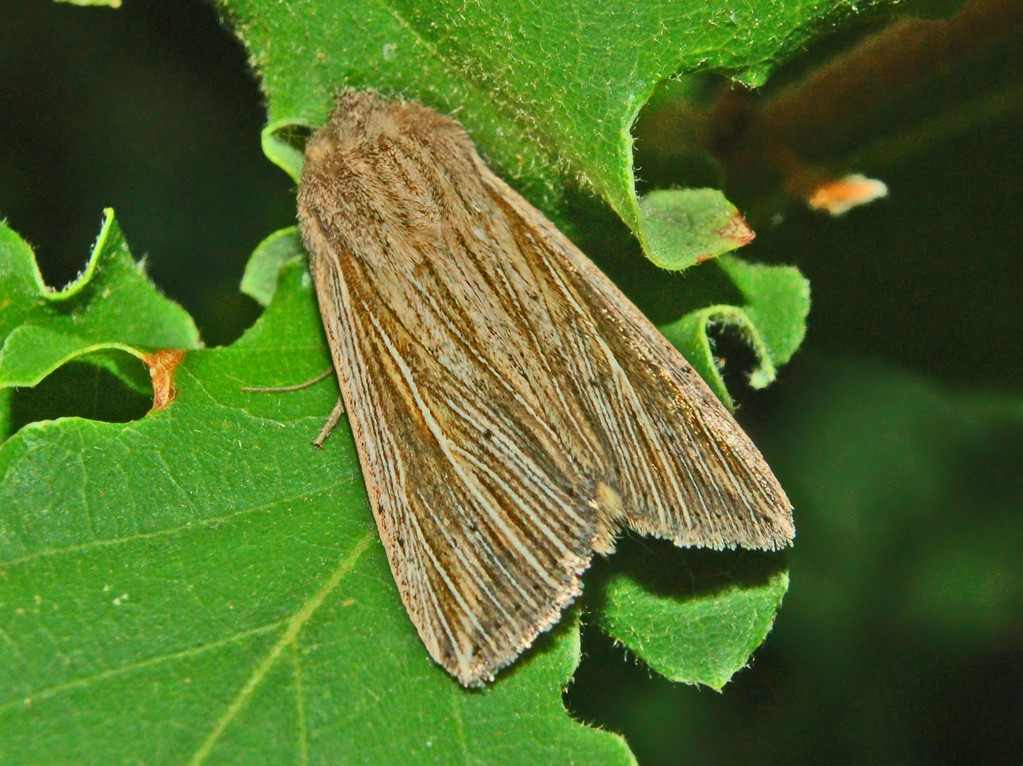

Scientific classification
- Kingdom: Animalia
- Phylum: Arthropoda
- Class: Insecta
- Order: Lepidoptera
- Superfamily: Noctuoidea
- Family: Noctuidae
- Genus: Mythimna
- Species: M. riparia

Binomial name
- Mythimna riparia (Rambur, 1829)

= Mythimna riparia =

Species of moth

Mythimna riparia is a species of moth of the family Noctuidae. It is found in Morocco, southern Europe, Turkey, Israel, Syria and Turkmenistan.

Adults are on wing from March to May and from September to October. There are two generations per year.

The larvae feed on various grasses, including Calamagrostis species and low herbaceous plants like Vicia and Trifolium species.
