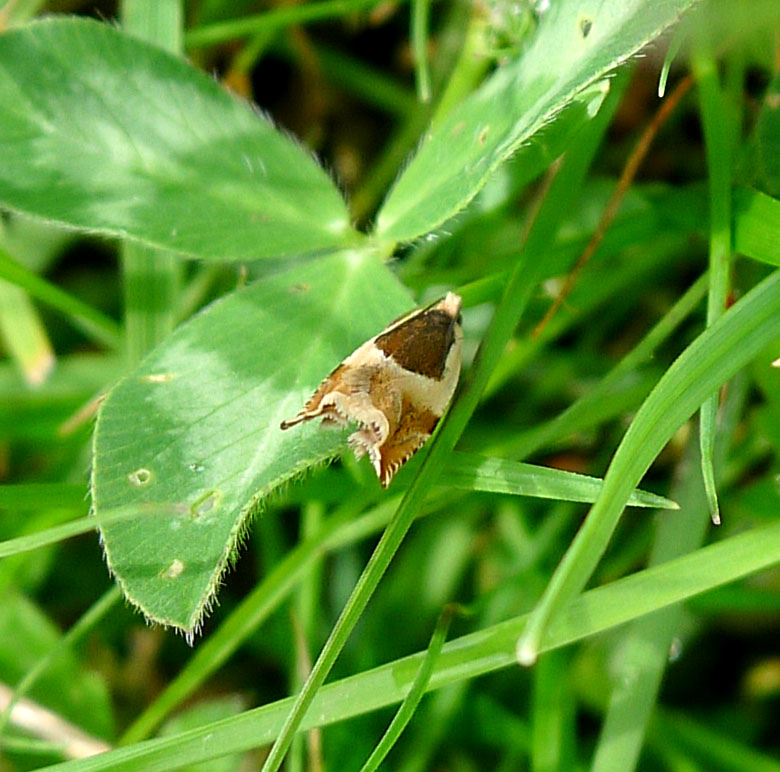

Scientific classification
- Domain: Eukaryota
- Kingdom: Animalia
- Phylum: Arthropoda
- Class: Insecta
- Order: Lepidoptera
- Family: Tortricidae
- Genus: Ancylis
- Species: A. paludana

Binomial name
- Ancylis paludana Barrett, 1871

= Ancylis paludana =

Species of butterfly

Ancylis paludana is a butterfly belonging to the family Tortricidae. The species was first described by Charles Golding Barrett in 1871.

It is native to Europe.
