= Cydia cognatana =

Scientific classification
- Domain: Eukaryota
- Kingdom: Animalia
- Phylum: Arthropoda
- Class: Insecta
- Order: Lepidoptera
- Family: Tortricidae
- Genus: Cydia
- Species: C. cognatana

Binomial name
- Cydia cognatana (Barrett, 1874)

Species of moth

Cydia cognatana is a species of moth belonging to the family Tortricidae. The species was first described by Charles Golding Barrett in 1874.

It is native to Europe.
