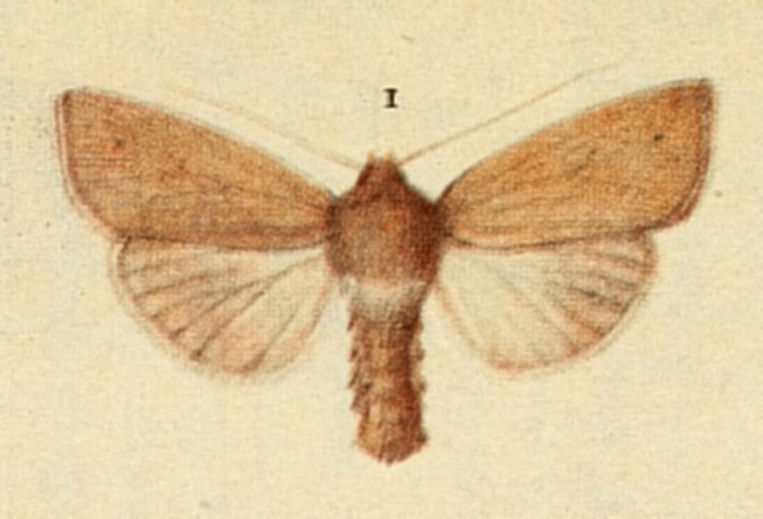

Scientific classification
- Domain: Eukaryota
- Kingdom: Animalia
- Phylum: Arthropoda
- Class: Insecta
- Order: Lepidoptera
- Superfamily: Noctuoidea
- Family: Noctuidae
- Genus: Mythimna
- Species: M. favicolor

Binomial name
- Mythimna favicolor Barrett, 1896

= Mythimna favicolor =

Species of moth

Mythimna favicolor, or Mathew's wainscot, is a moth of the family Noctuidae. The species was first described by Charles Golding Barrett in 1896. It is found in Europe (Britain, Denmark, Germany, the Netherlands). The species is sometimes treated as a subspecies of Mythimna pallens, the common wainscot.

== Technical description and variation ==
S. favicolor Bart. Forewing pale olive brown; veins concolorous, slightly defined by brown; the intervals at termen with brown streaks; a small black dot at lower end of cell; an outer row of black dots on veins, sometimes reduced to two only, on veins 2 and 5; hindwing fuscous whitish; - ab. lutea Tutt is paler and yellowish; — in ab. rufa Tutt the head, thorax, and forewings are bright rufous; abdomen and hindwing tinged with rufous; — argillacea Tutt has the forewing greyish luteous, the fringe pink; hindwing senea. smoky; — ab. cenea Mathew is deep orange, the hindwing smoky; the veins darker and the fringe pale; — obscura Mathew is cinnamon-brown with smoky clouding between the veins in places; hindwing smoky; fringe pale;- pallida Mathew has the forewing very silky, pale creamy buff, the termen flushed with rosy; hind wing whitish grey; — lastly, fusco-rosea Mathew is rosy buff: the hindwing pale rosy: the veins conspicuously dark brown; close to the ab. rufa Tutt.The wingspan is 35–40 mm (1.4–1.6 in). Larva pinkish ochreous reticulated with darker; dorsal line pale, narrow, with darker edges: subdorsal greyish white; a broader grey stripe above the spiracles and a pinkish ochreous one below.

== Similar species ==
Mythimna favicolor is difficult to certainly distinguish from its congeners. See Townsend et al. for genitalia images and an identification key.

- Mythimna straminea (Treitschke, 1825)
- Mythimna impura (Hübner, 1808)
- Mythimna pallens (Linnaeus, 1758)

== Biology ==
The moth flies from June to July depending on the location. The larvae feed on Puccinellia maritima.
