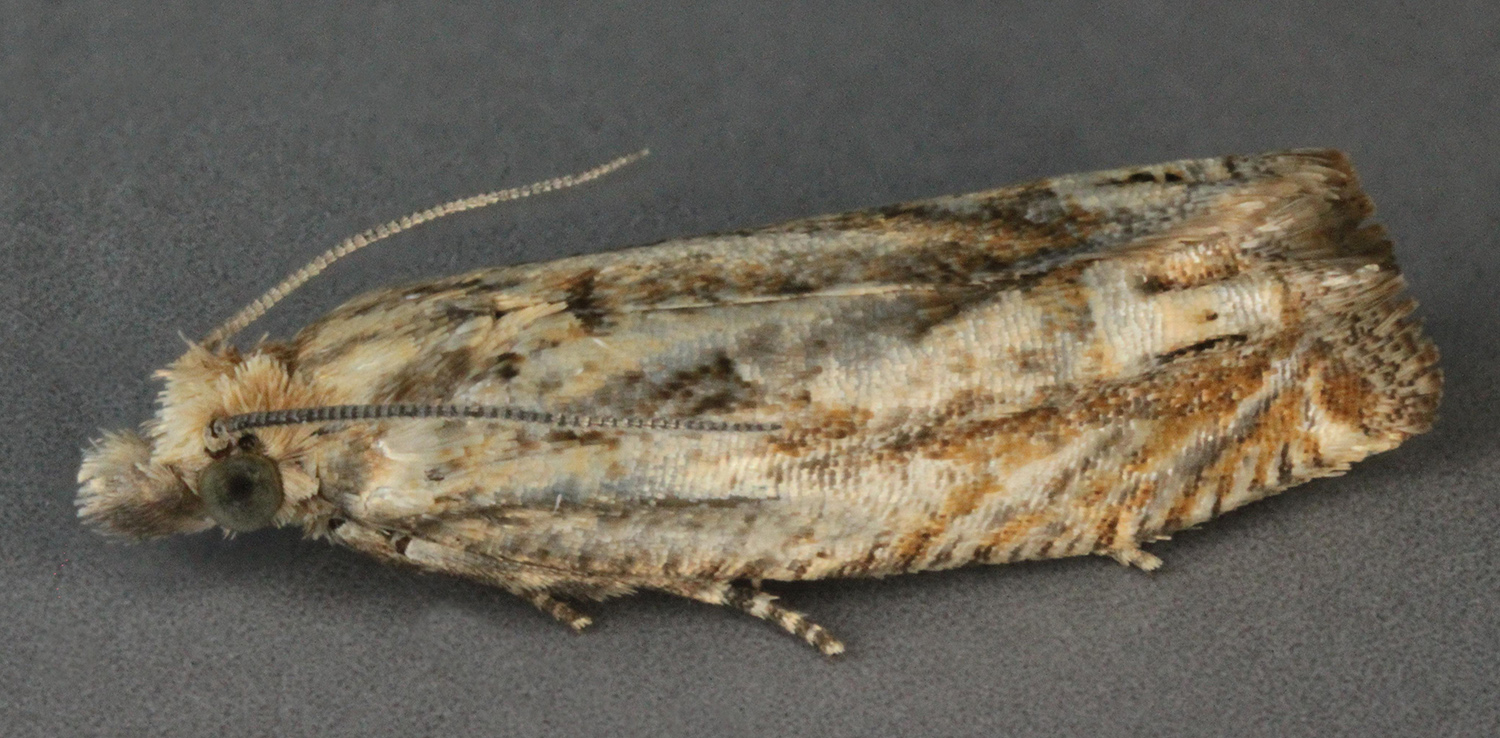
- Eucosma tripoliana, Flint Marsh, North Wales

Scientific classification
- Kingdom: Animalia
- Phylum: Arthropoda
- Clade: Pancrustacea
- Class: Insecta
- Order: Lepidoptera
- Family: Tortricidae
- Genus: Eucosma
- Species: E. tripoliana

Binomial name
- Eucosma tripoliana (Barrett, 1880)

= Eucosma tripoliana =

Species of moth

Eucosma tripoliana is a species of moth belonging to the family Tortricidae.

It is native to Europe. The wingspan is 13–17 mm. The forewings have a few narrow, light slashes around the wing tip, at the tornus an oval, light spot with a single black longitudinal line. At the posterior edge there are more or less clear, bright (often grey) spots. The larva is pale brownish yellow.

The larvae develop on the flower heads of Aster tripolium and the species can be found on beaches and salt meadows where it grows. The adult wraps fly in July-August.
