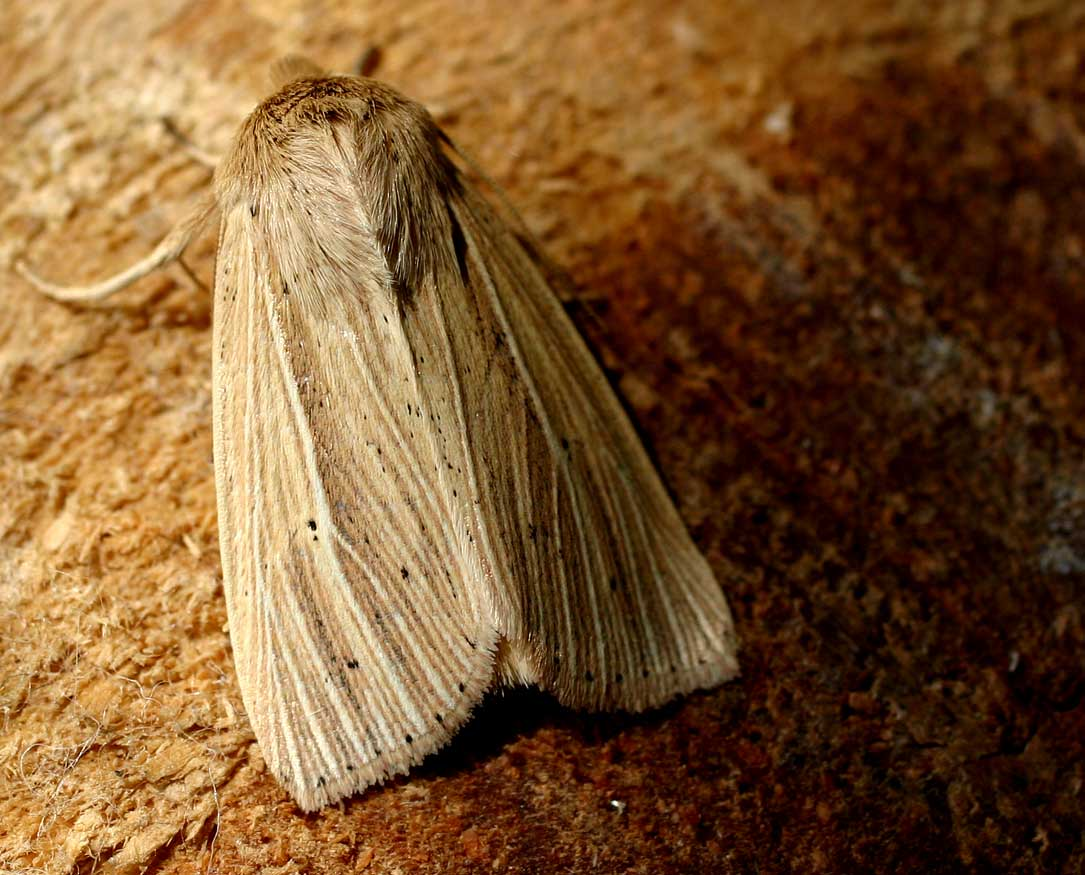

Scientific classification
- Kingdom: Animalia
- Phylum: Arthropoda
- Clade: Pancrustacea
- Class: Insecta
- Order: Lepidoptera
- Superfamily: Noctuoidea
- Family: Noctuidae
- Genus: Mythimna
- Species: M. impura

Binomial name
- Mythimna impura (Hübner, 1808)

= Mythimna impura =

Smoky wainscot

Species of moth

Mythimna impura, the smoky wainscot, is a moth of the family Noctuidae. The species was first described by Jacob Hübner in 1808. It is distributed throughout most of the Palearctic realm from Ireland in the west of Europe east to the Caucasus, Turkey, Syria, Kazakhstan, Russia, Siberia, Mongolia, then Japan. In Europe it is found from the Arctic Circle to Spain and Italy (including Sicily) in the south, as well as in the northern regions of Greece.

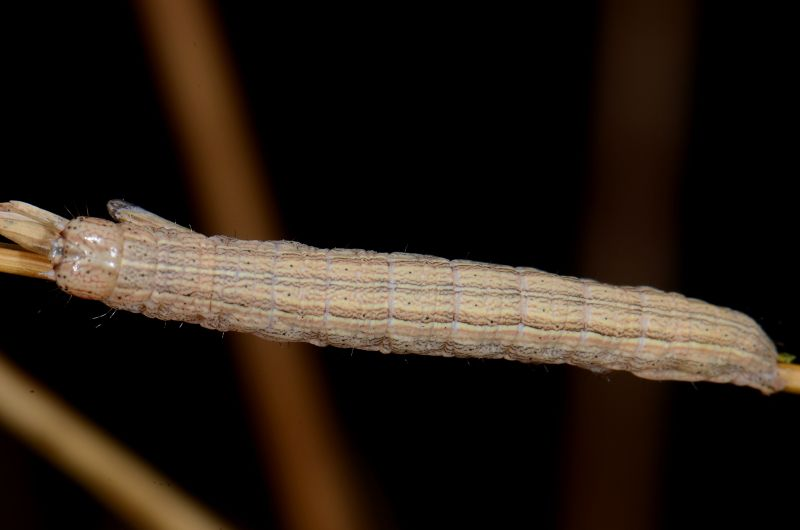
Larva

As with other "wainscots", this species has buffish yellow forewings with prominent venation. The smoky wainscot has a dark basal streak with another shorter streak nearer to the costa and tornus. This species has grey hindwings with white margins. The wingspan is 31–38 mm.

== Technical description and variation ==
Forewing ochreous, with a rufous tinge; veins, especially the median, whiter, lined by fine brown streaks, which also appear in the interspaces; a dark shade below median nervure; a black clot at lower angle of cell; outer row of dots shown only by those on veins 2 and 5; hindwing dull grey. - ab. dungana Alph., from Turkestan and Tibet, is a darker, more fuscous, form in which the dark streaks become obscured; - ab. transbaikalensis Stgr. from Transbaikal has the forewing dusted with red brown, and the dark streaks almost obsolete; — ab. amurensis Stgr. is wholly darker; the forewing with the white veins and the dark markings more distinct; - in ab. fuscipennis nov. [Warren] from Calabria and La Grave, Hautes Alpes, smaller than typical, the hindwing is blackish fuscous. See also Hacker et al.

== Similar species ==
Mythimna impura is difficult to certainly distinguish from its congeners. See Townsend et al. for genitalia images and an identification key.

- Mythimna straminea (Treitschke, 1825)
- Mythimna pallens (Linnaeus, 1758)
- Mythimna favicolor (Barrett, 1896)

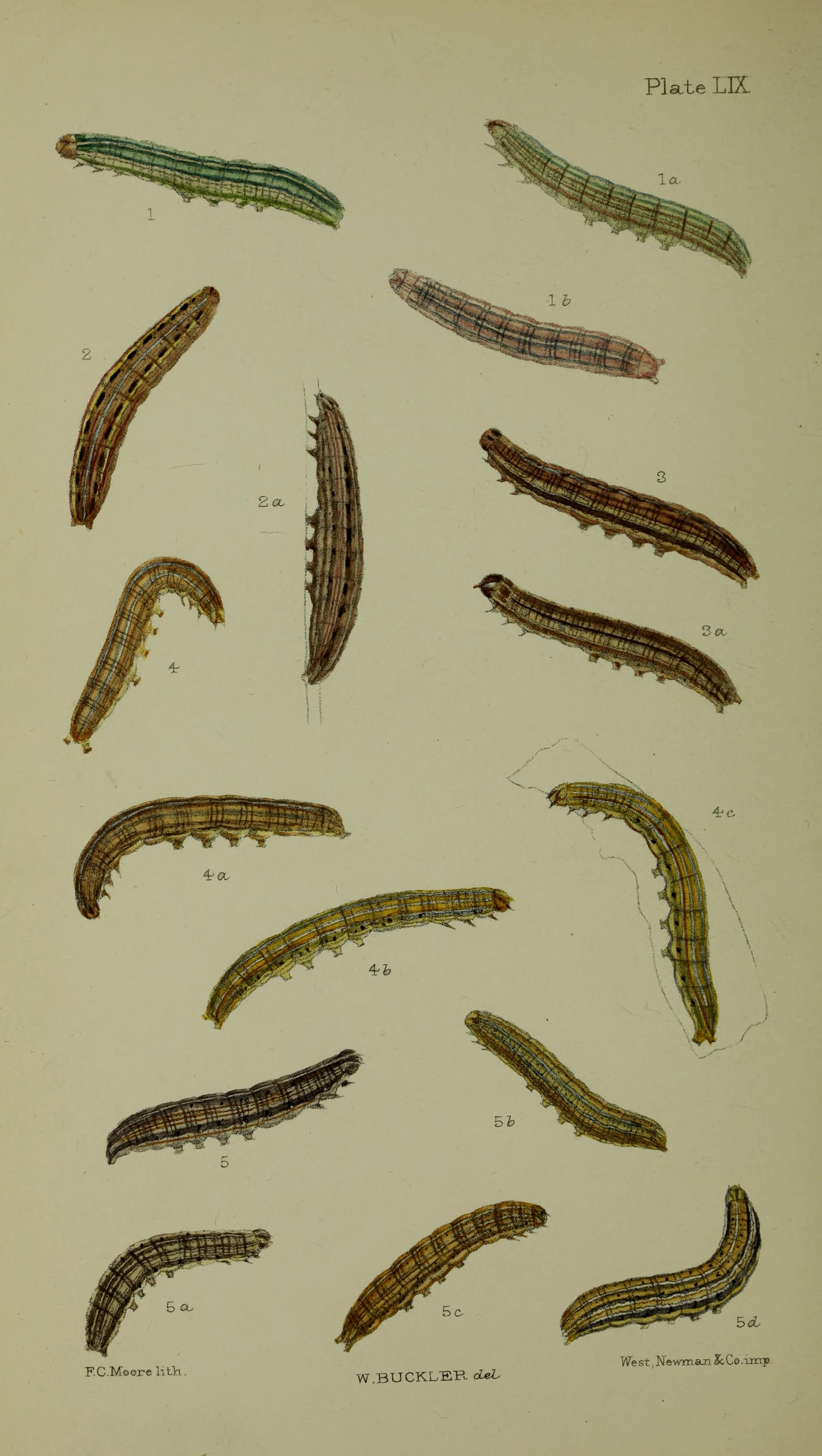
Figs 5 5a, 5b, 5c, 5d larva after last moult

== Biology ==
One or two broods are produced each year and adults can be seen at any time between June and October. It flies at night and is attracted to light, sugar and various flowers. The larva is brown or greyish ochreous, sometimes tannish peach; the lines pale with darker edges. It feeds on various grasses including Alopecurus, Dactylis, Deschampsia, Leymus and Phragmites and has also been recorded on the sedge, Carex and the rush, Luzula. This species overwinters as a small larva.
