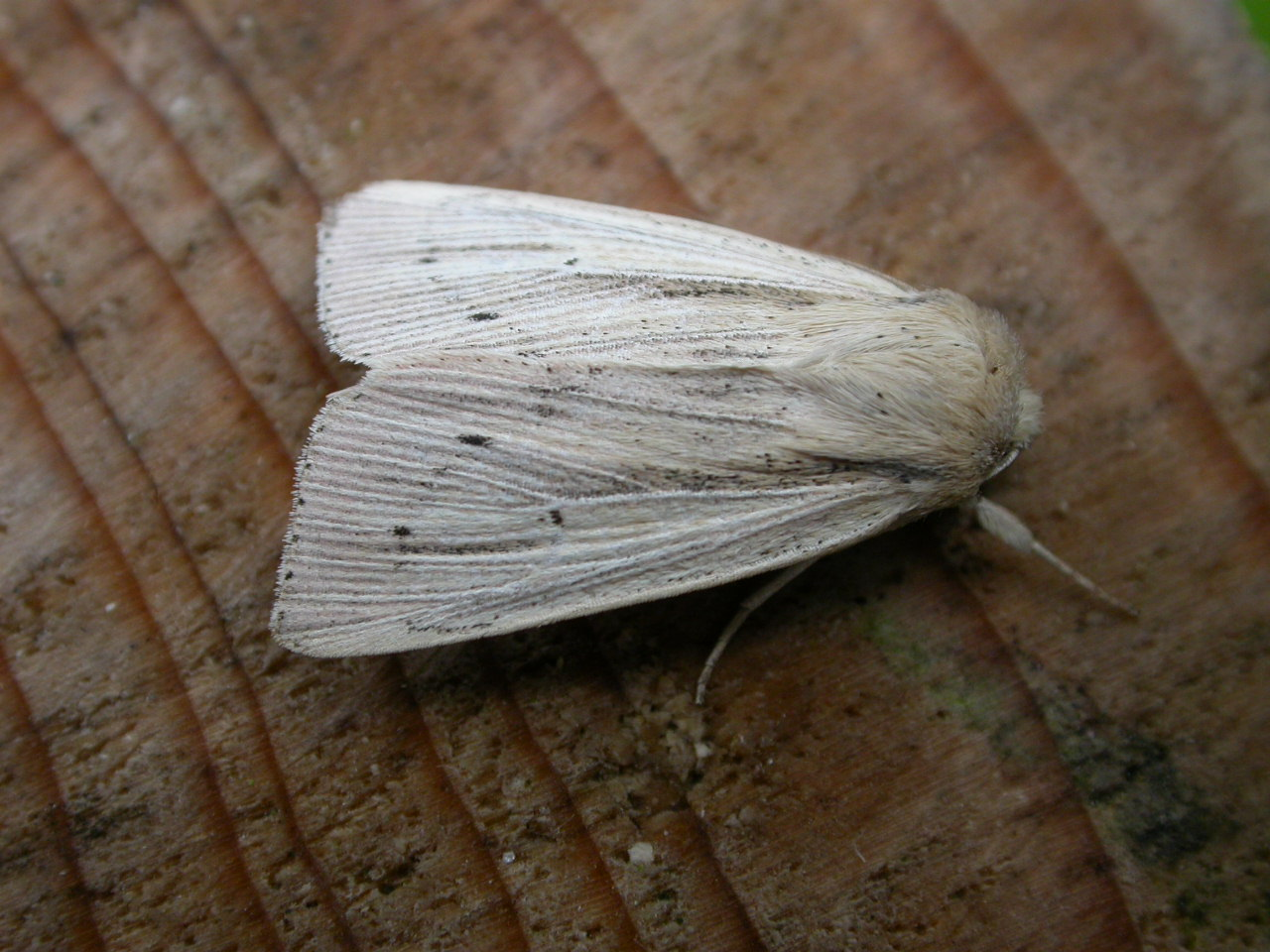

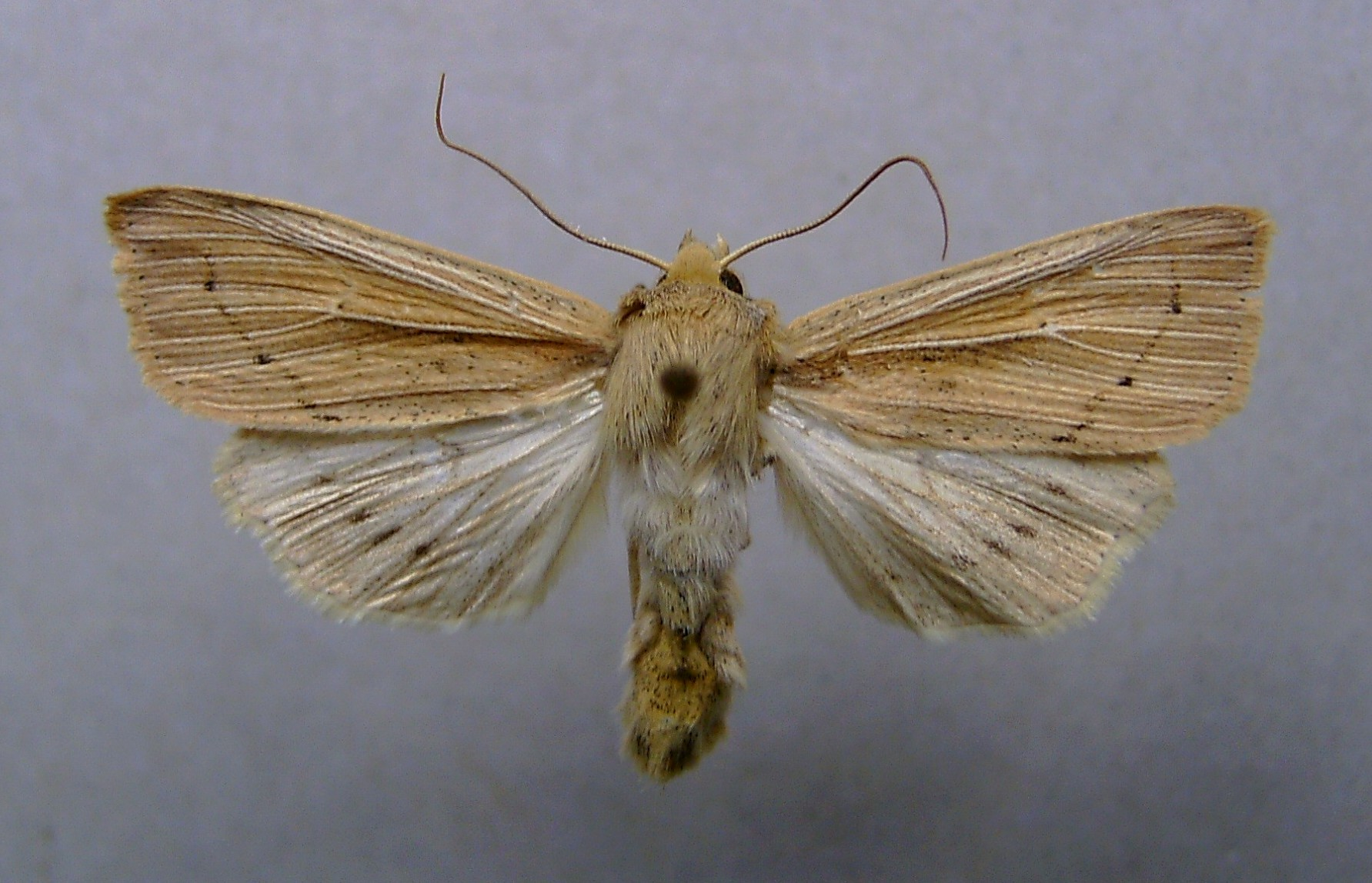

Scientific classification
- Domain: Eukaryota
- Kingdom: Animalia
- Phylum: Arthropoda
- Class: Insecta
- Order: Lepidoptera
- Superfamily: Noctuoidea
- Family: Noctuidae
- Genus: Mythimna
- Species: M. straminea

Binomial name
- Mythimna straminea (Treitschke, 1825)

Synonyms
- Aletia straminea

= Mythimna straminea =

Species of moth

Mythimna straminea, the southern wainscot, is a moth of the family Noctuidae. The species was first described by Georg Friedrich Treitschke in 1825. It is found in the western parts of the Palearctic realm, including Morocco, Europe, Turkey, the Caucasus, Israel, and Lebanon.

== Technical description and variation ==
The wingspan is 32 to 40 millimetres (1.3 to 1.6 in). Forewing pale ochreous with slight dark dusting and a faint reddish tinge; veins finely defined by brown streaks, which are also distinct in the intervals; a diffuse brown shade below median vein; outer dots on veins 2 and 5 only; hindwing whitish ochreous, grey tinged along middle from base, with a postmedian line of dark grey dashes on veins.

Three distinct aberrations are mentioned by Tutt, all apparently British; obsoleta Tutt, a very rare pale form, with all the dots of forewing absent, the median nervure pure white, and the hindwing white without dots; in rufolinea Tutt the colouration is bright rufous, so that the forewing appears to consist of alternate fine lines of red and white; lastly in nigrostriata Tutt the colouration is blackish, the wing appearing to be a succession of black and white lines; the shade beneath median vein is almost black, and the hindwing is much darker; the majority of these darker forms are males. See also Hacker et al.

== Similar species ==
Mythimna straminea is difficult to certainly distinguish from its congeners. See Townsend et al. for genitalia images and an identification key.

- Mythimna impura (Hübner, 1808)
- Mythimna pallens (Linnaeus, 1758)
- Mythimna favicolor (Barrett, 1896)

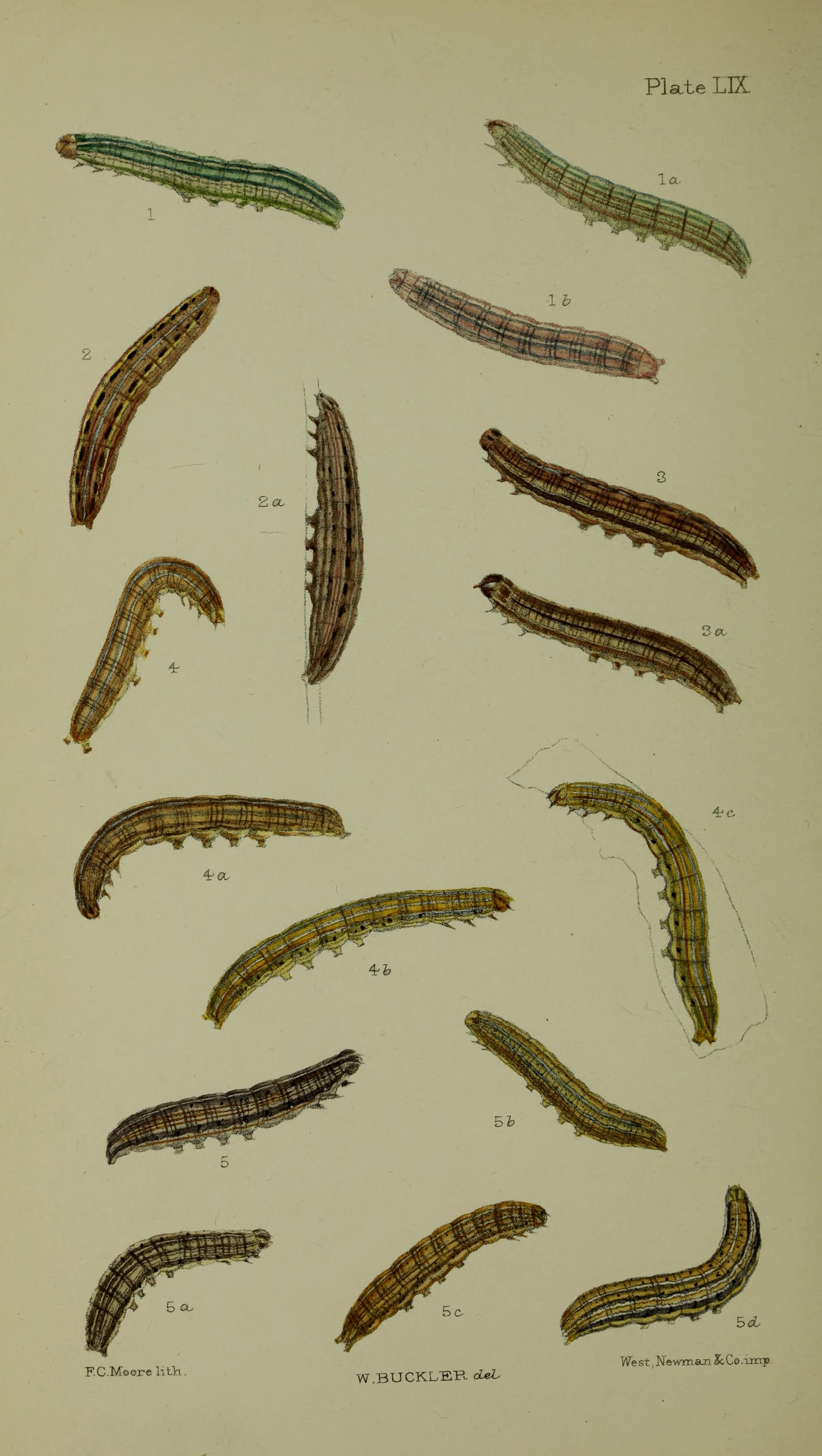
Figs 4, 4a, 4b, 4c larva after last moult

== Biology ==
The moth flies from June to August depending on the location.

The moth has larva ochreous with grey freckles; lines paler edged with dark grey; subspiracular line paler. The larvae feed on Phragmites and Phalaris.
