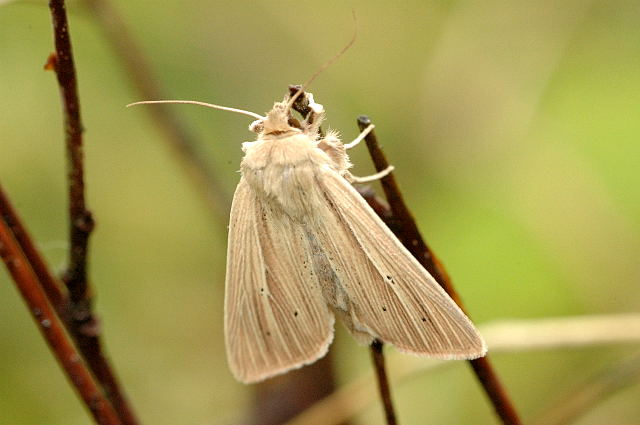

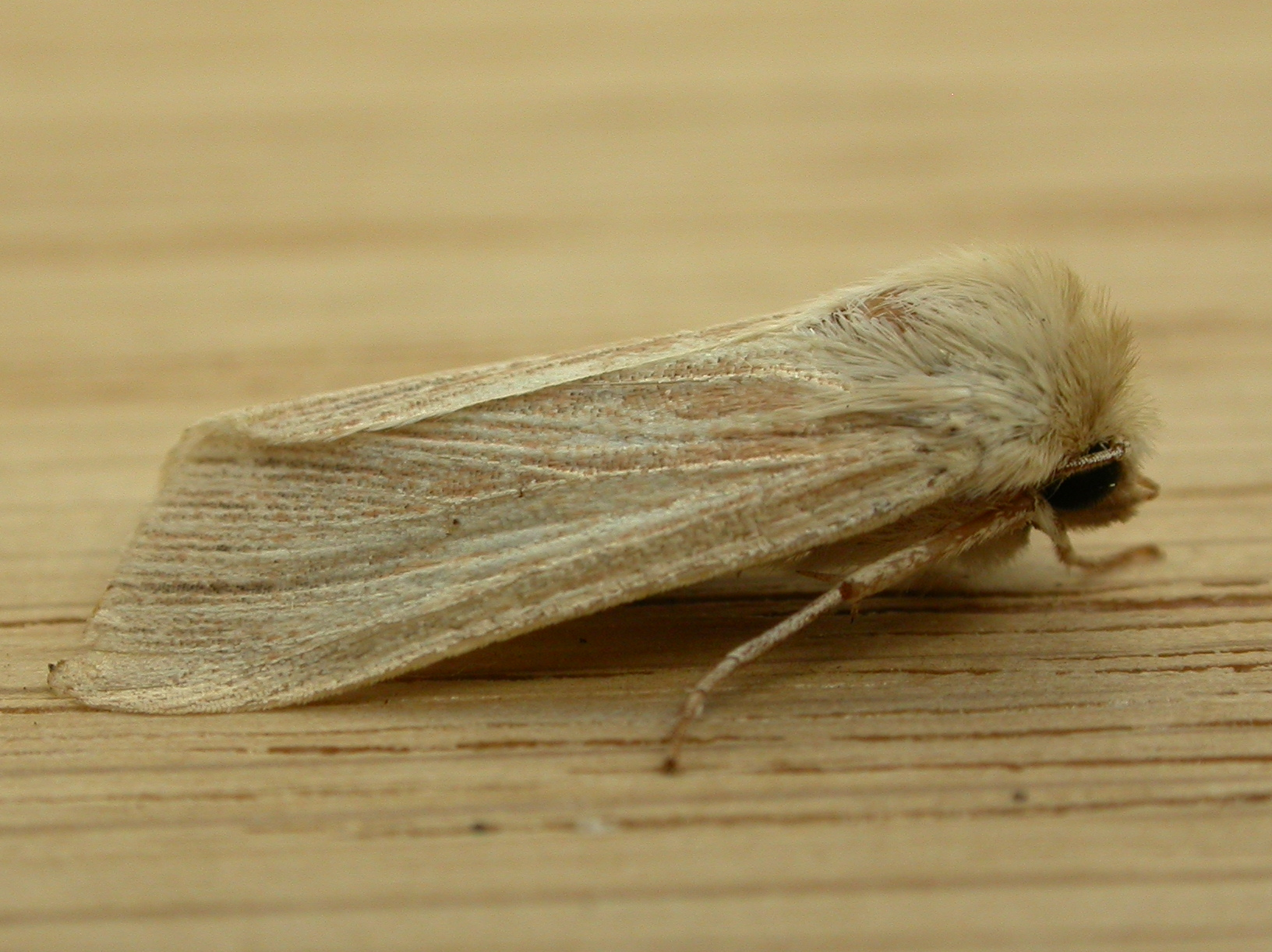

Scientific classification
- Kingdom: Animalia
- Phylum: Arthropoda
- Class: Insecta
- Order: Lepidoptera
- Superfamily: Noctuoidea
- Family: Noctuidae
- Genus: Mythimna
- Species: M. pallens

Binomial name
- Mythimna pallens (Linnaeus, 1758)

= Mythimna pallens =

Common wainscot

Species of moth

Mythimna pallens, the common wainscot, is a moth of the family Noctuidae distributed throughout the Palearctic realm from Ireland in the west, through Europe (all of Russia) to Central Asia and Amur to the Kuriles in the east. The species was first described by Carl Linnaeus in his 1758 10th edition of Systema Naturae.

As with other "wainscots", this species has buffish-yellow forewings with prominent venation. The common wainscot, as the specific name suggests, is very pale, lacking the darker markings shown by most of its relatives. The hindwings are pure white.

== Technical description and variation ==
The wingspan is 32–40 mm. Forewing yellowish ochreous, often with a rufous tinge; veins pale, defined by grey-brown streaks, and with similar streaks in the intervals; dark spots on veins 2 and 5 beyond middle; hindwing white, grey at centre, the veins dark; — ab. ectypa Hbn. Is the form in which the red tints are strongest; in arcuata Stph. the hindwing shows a complete row of dark dots on the veins. See also Hacker et al.

== Similar species ==
Mythimna impura is difficult to certainly distinguish from its congeners. See Townsend et al.

- Mythimna straminea (Treitschke, 1825)
- Mythimna impura (Hübner, 1808)
- Mythimna favicolor (Barrett, 1896)

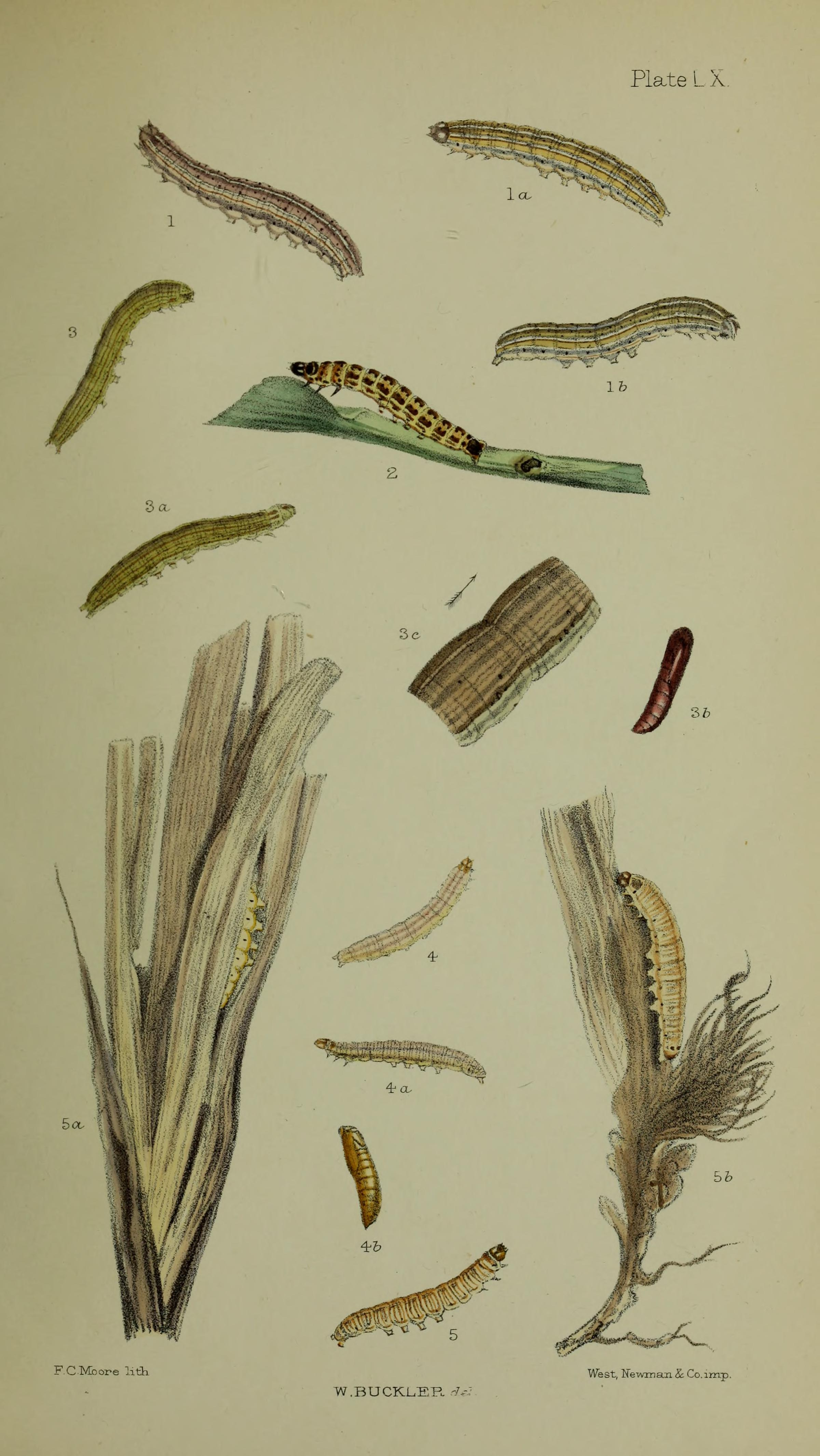
Figs 1, 1a, 1b larva after last moult

== Biology ==
One or two broods are produced each year with adults on the wing at any time from June to October. The moth flies at night and is attracted to light, sugar and various flowers.

The larva is yellowish or reddish with grey irroration (sprinkling); dorsal line white, with dark edges; spiracles black, lying in a yellowish white lateral stripe, which is edged with blackish. It feeds on various grasses including Deschampsia, Festuca, Leymus, Lolium and Phalaris. The species overwinters as a small larva.

1. The flight season refers to the British Isles. This may vary in other parts of the range.
