= Charles Golding Barrett =

English entomologist

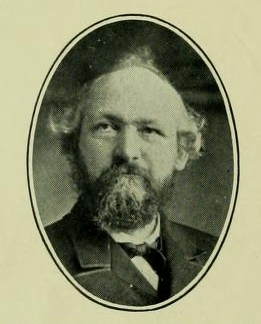

Charles Golding Barrett (5 May 1836, Colyton, Devon – 11 December 1904, London) was an English entomologist who specialised in Lepidoptera. He wrote The Lepidoptera of the British Islands: A Descriptive Account of the Families, Genera, and Species Indigenous to Great Britain and Ireland, Their Preparatory States, Habits, and Localities. London: L. Reeve, 1893–1907.

Golding Barrett was responsible for the naming of two new genera of moths.
