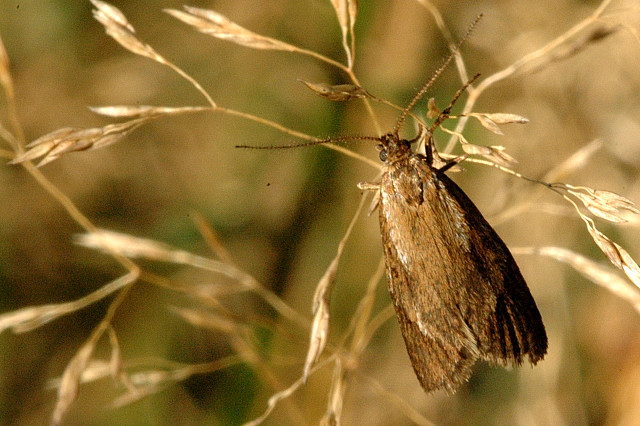
- Diurnea lipsiella

Scientific classification
- Kingdom: Animalia
- Phylum: Arthropoda
- Clade: Pancrustacea
- Class: Insecta
- Order: Lepidoptera
- Family: Lypusidae
- Subfamily: Chimabachinae; Heinemann, 1870

Genera
- See text

Synonyms
- Diurneinae Toll, 1964; Chimabachidae; Chimabachini

= Chimabachinae =

Subfamily of moths

Chimabachinae, the chimabachid moths, is a subfamily of moths in the family Lypusidae. The subfamily used to be classified as a subfamily of Oecophoridae, but current phylogenetic research classifies it as a subfamily of Lypusidae. Some authors placed it as the subfamily Cryptolechiinae in the family Depressariidae. The subfamily is distributed in the Palearctic realm, ranging from Europe to Japan, although the blueberry leafroller (Dasystoma salicella) has been introduced to North America.

== Taxonomy and systematics ==
- Diurnea Haworth, 1811
- Dasystoma Curtis, 1833

== Gallery ==
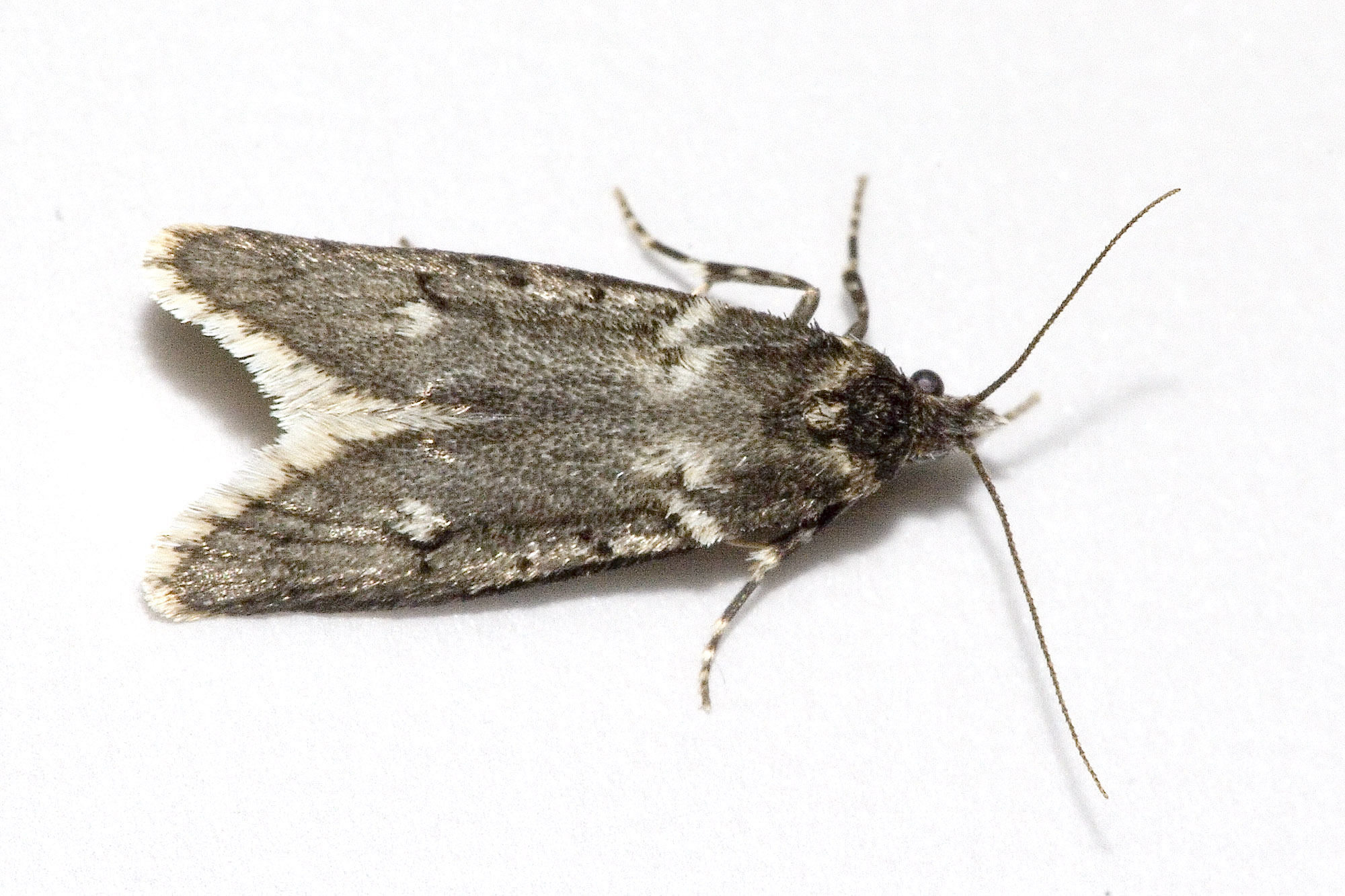
Diurnea fagella

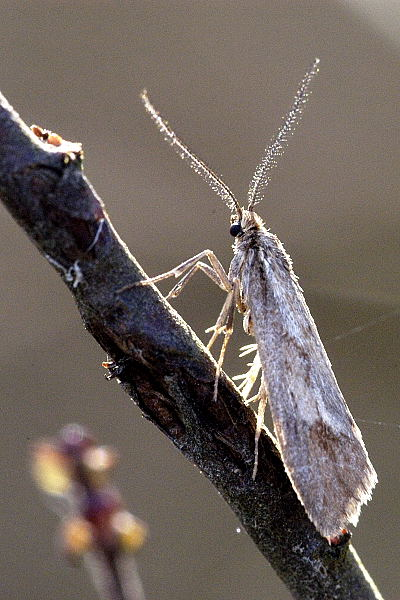
Diurnea lipsiella

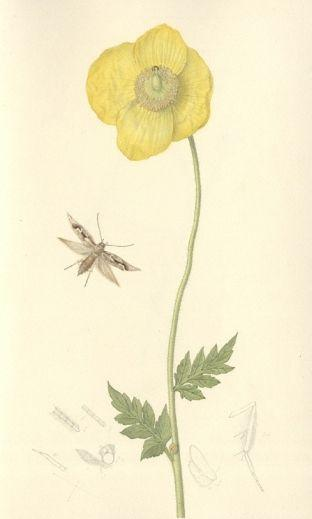
Diurnea novembris
