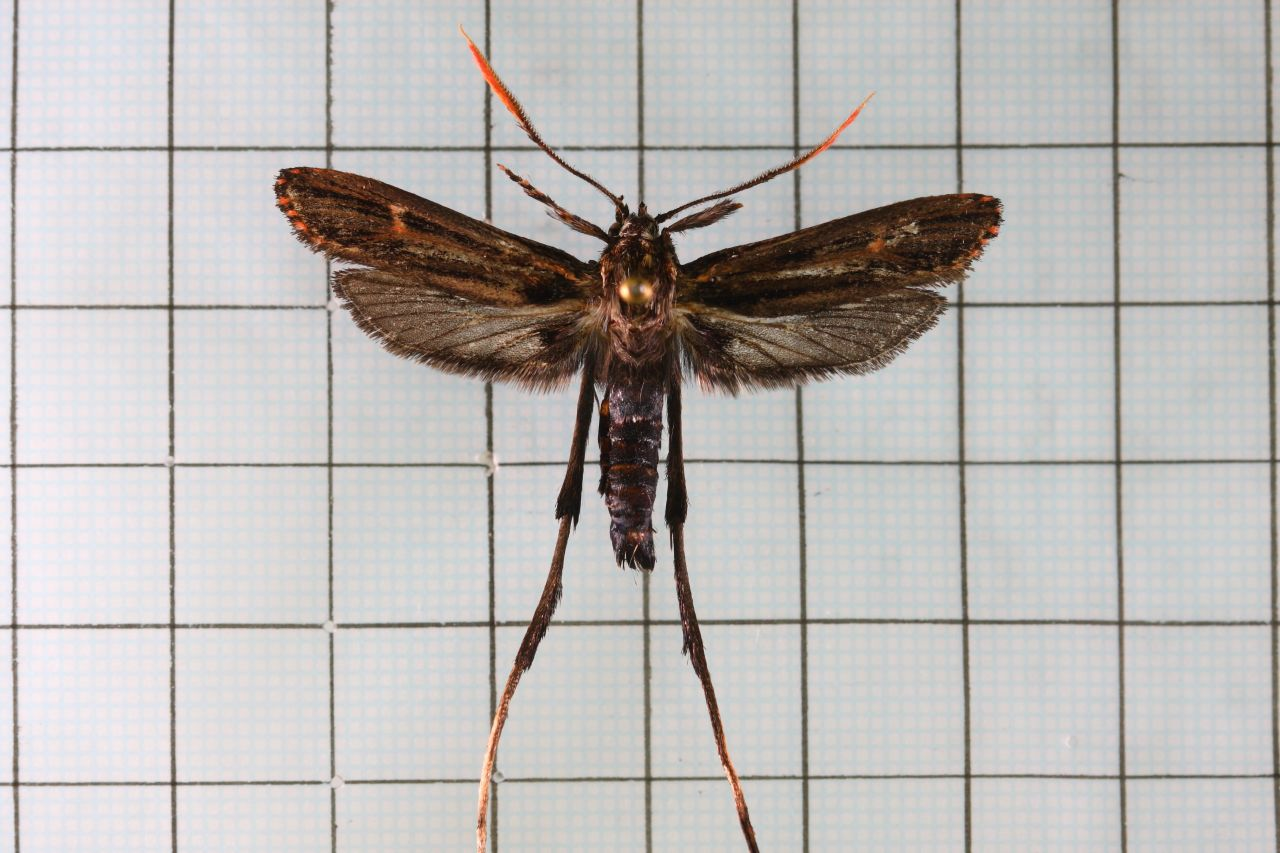
- Ashinaga longimana

Scientific classification
- Kingdom: Animalia
- Phylum: Arthropoda
- Clade: Pancrustacea
- Class: Insecta
- Order: Lepidoptera
- Family: Oecophoridae
- Subfamily: Oecophorinae
- Genus: Ashinaga; Matsumura, 1929

Synonyms
- Aeolarcha Meyrick, 1931

= Ashinaga =

Genus of moths

Ashinaga is a genus of moths in the family Oecophoridae.

== Species ==
- Ashinaga eophthalma (Meyrick, 1931) (previously in Aeolarcha)
- Ashinaga longimana Matsumura, 1929

== Taxonomy ==
The genus was previously assigned to its own family, Ashinagaidae. Later, it was assigned to the subfamilies Chimabachinae as well as Stathmopodinae until it was finally placed in the Oecophoridae.
