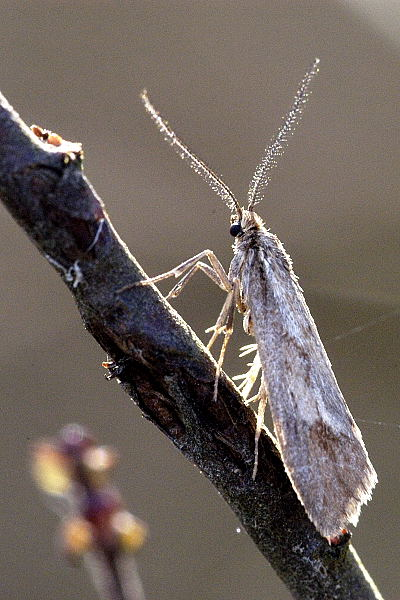

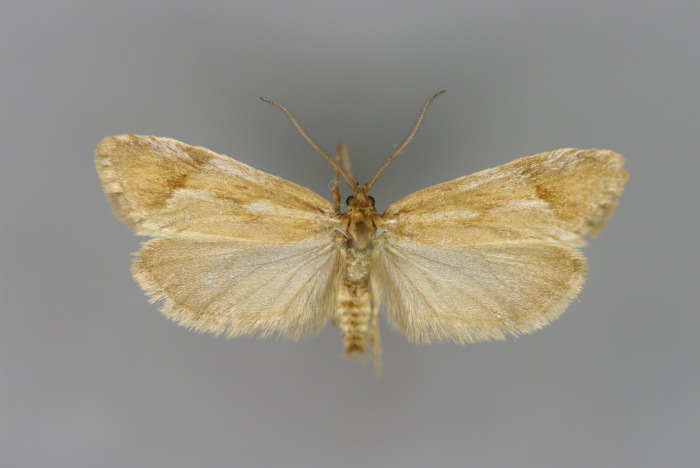

Scientific classification
- Domain: Eukaryota
- Kingdom: Animalia
- Phylum: Arthropoda
- Class: Insecta
- Order: Lepidoptera
- Family: Lypusidae
- Genus: Diurnea
- Species: D. lipsiella

Binomial name
- Diurnea lipsiella (Denis & Schiffermüller, 1775)

Synonyms
- Tinea lipsiella Denis & Schiffermüller, 1775; Tinea phryganella Hübner, 1801; Diurnea phryganella

= Diurnea lipsiella =

Species of moth

Diurnea lipsiella is a moth of the subfamily Chimabachinae. It is found in Europe.

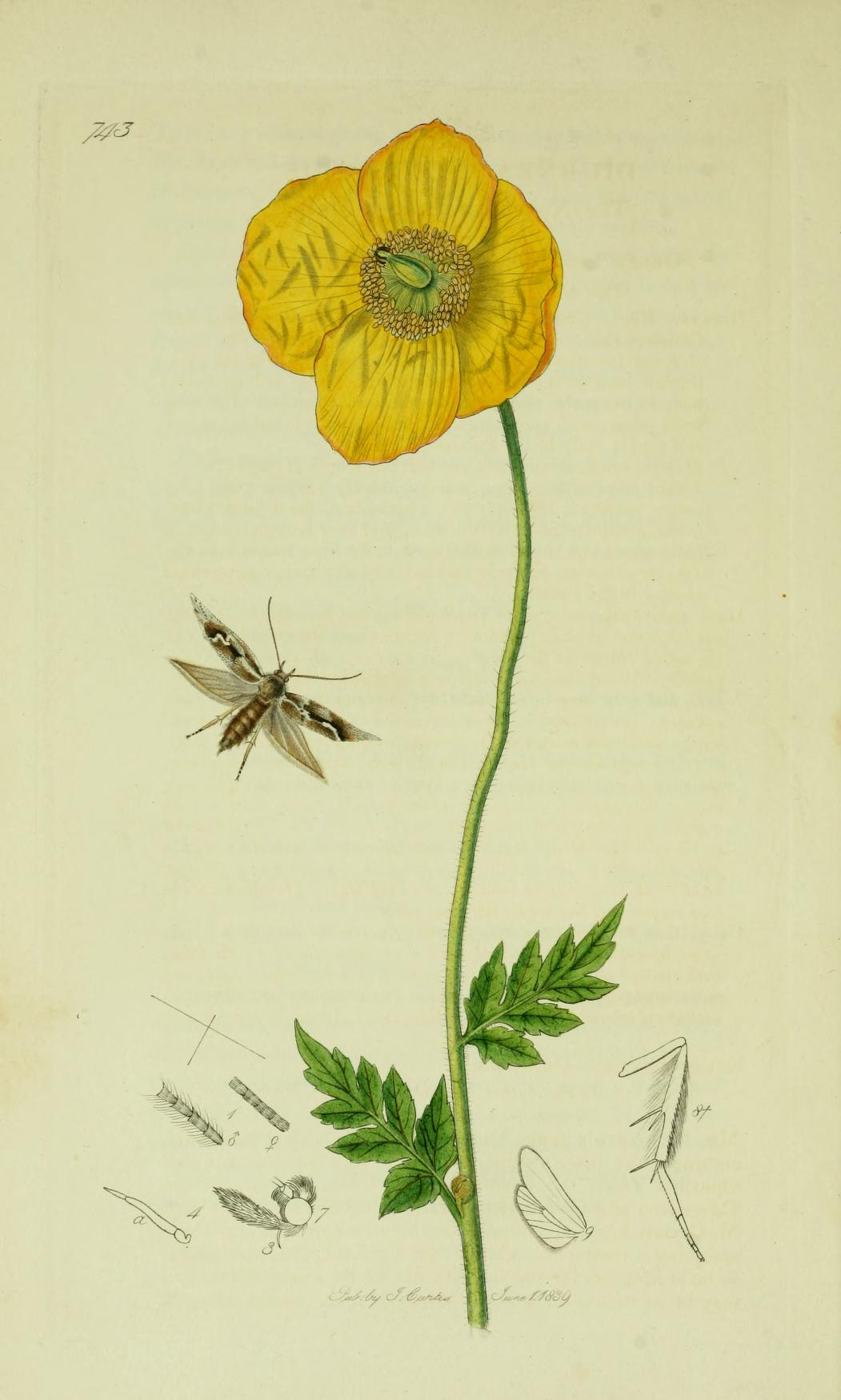
Illustration from John Curtis's British Entomology Volume 6

The wingspan is 17–23 mm. Meyrick describes it - Male 21–25 mm. The antennae with long fasciculate ciliations. Forewings are light ochreous-brown; sometimes a whitish sprinkling towards middle of costa and in disc beyond middle; stigmata very obscurely darker, second discal lying on an indistinct oblique darker shade from 3/5 of costa to tornus. Hindwings grey. Female 17–19 mm. Forewings grey-whitish, irrorated with dark grey; stigmata and oblique marks before middle and above tornus blackish, sometimes partly connected. The larva is yellow - whitish; head dark brown; plate of 2 brown freckled; 3rd pair of legs placed on a shining tubercle (in male only ?).

The moth flies in one generation from October to December depending on the location.

The larvae feed on various deciduous trees and shrubs, such as Rubus, apple, Prunus, Vaccinium and oak.
