= Dasystoma kurentzovi =

Scientific classification
- Kingdom: Animalia
- Phylum: Arthropoda
- Clade: Pancrustacea
- Class: Insecta
- Order: Lepidoptera
- Family: Lypusidae
- Genus: Dasystoma
- Species: D. kurentzovi

Binomial name
- Dasystoma kurentzovi (Lvovsky, 1990)

Synonyms
- Cheimophila kurentzovi Lvovsky, 1990

Species of moth

Dasystoma kurentzovi is a moth in the family Lypusidae. It was described by Alexandr L. Lvovsky in 1990. It is found in south-eastern Siberia.
