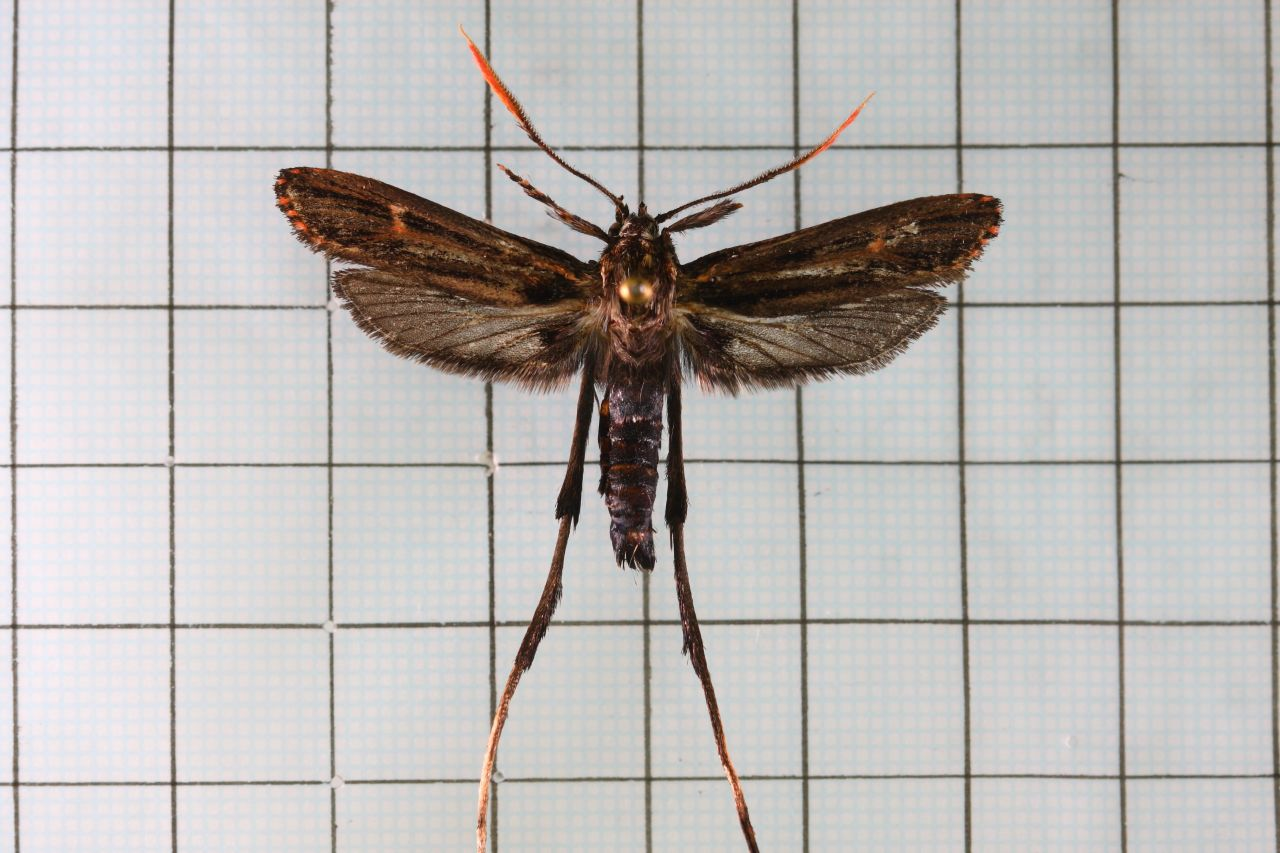

Scientific classification
- Kingdom: Animalia
- Phylum: Arthropoda
- Clade: Pancrustacea
- Class: Insecta
- Order: Lepidoptera
- Family: Oecophoridae
- Genus: Ashinaga
- Species: A. longimana

Binomial name
- Ashinaga longimana Matsumura, 1929

= Ashinaga longimana =

Species of moth

Ashinaga longimana is a moth of the family Oecophoridae. It is found in Taiwan.

The wingspan is about 40 mm. They have extraordinary long hind legs.
