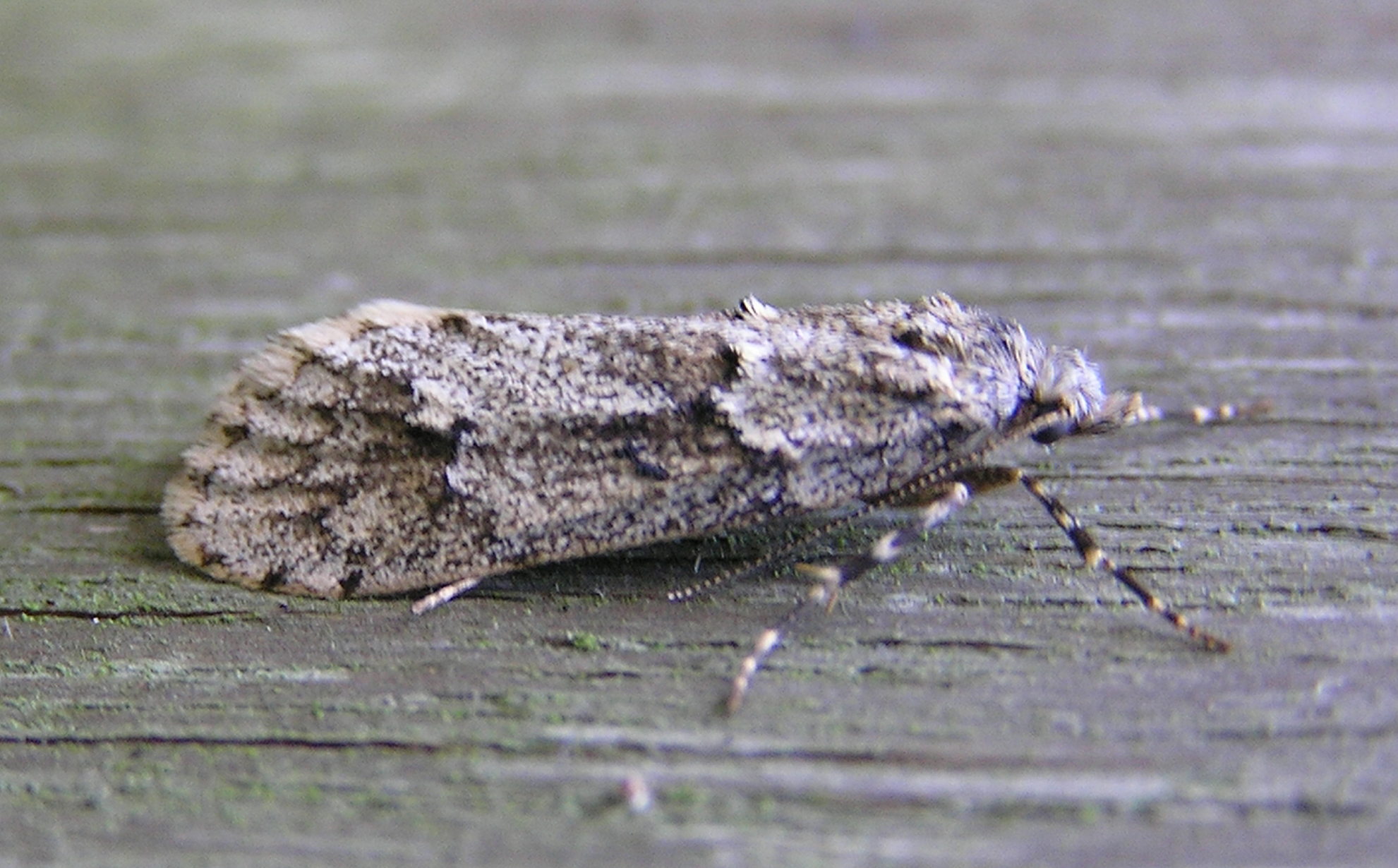
- Diurnea fagella

Scientific classification
- Kingdom: Animalia
- Phylum: Arthropoda
- Clade: Pancrustacea
- Class: Insecta
- Order: Lepidoptera
- Family: Lypusidae
- Subfamily: Chimabachinae
- Genus: Diurnea; Haworth, 1811

Species
- See text.

= Diurnea =

Genus of moths

Diurnea is a genus of moths of the subfamily Chimabachinae. The genus is noted for sexual dimorphism, with the males fully winged and the females having reduced wings and incapable of flight. The larvae are polyphagous i.e. feeding on many plants, in this case deciduous shrubs and trees.

== Species ==
The genus consists of the following species:

- Diurnea fagella (Denis & Schiffermüller, 1775)
- Diurnea lipsiella (Denis & Schiffermüller, 1775)
