= Ashinaga eophthalma =

Scientific classification
- Kingdom: Animalia
- Phylum: Arthropoda
- Class: Insecta
- Order: Lepidoptera
- Family: Oecophoridae
- Genus: Ashinaga
- Species: A. eophthalma

Binomial name
- Ashinaga eophthalma (Meyrick, 1931)

Synonyms
- Aeolarcha eophthalma Meyrick, 1931

Species of moth

Ashinaga eophthalma is a moth of the family Oecophoridae. It is found in China.
