= Dasystoma =

Scientific classification
- Domain: Eukaryota
- Kingdom: Animalia
- Phylum: Arthropoda
- Class: Insecta
- Order: Lepidoptera
- Family: Lypusidae
- Genus: Dasystoma; Curtis, 1833

Genus of moths

Dasystoma is a genus of moths in the Lypusidae family.

== Species ==
- Dasystoma salicella (Hübner, 1796)
- Dasystoma kurentzovi (Lvovsky, 1990)
