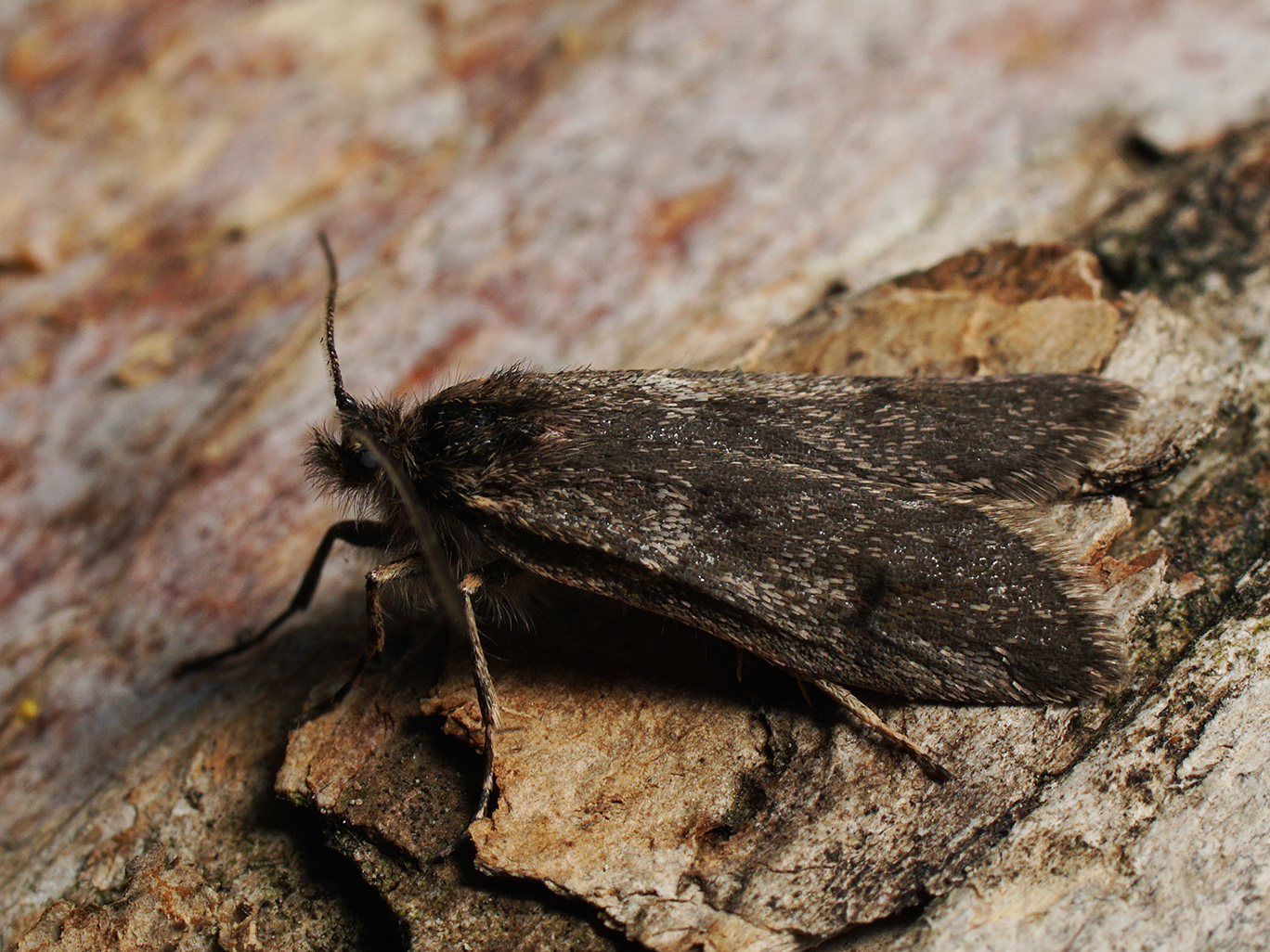

Scientific classification
- Kingdom: Animalia
- Phylum: Arthropoda
- Clade: Pancrustacea
- Class: Insecta
- Order: Lepidoptera
- Family: Lypusidae
- Genus: Dasystoma
- Species: D. salicella

Binomial name
- Dasystoma salicella (Hübner, 1796)

Synonyms
- Tinea salicella Hübner, 1796; Cheimophila salicella; Hercyna rufocrinitalis Zetterstedt, 1840

= Dasystoma salicella =

Species of moth

Dasystoma salicella, sometimes also known as the blueberry leafroller, is a moth of the family Lypusidae. It is endemic to Europe, but is an introduced species in North America.

The wingspan is 6 to 10 millimetres (0.24 to 0.39 in) for females (which are not able to fly) and 17 to 20 millimetres (0.67 to 0.79 in) for males. In males, the forewings are fuscous, somewhat whitish-sprinkled; costal edge whitish-rosy; an irregular ill-defined dark fuscous transverse rather oblique fascia before middle, not reaching dorsum, and transverse mark in disc at 2/3 each preceded by a whitish suffusion. The hindwings are fuscous. In females, the forewings are grey, whitish -sprinkled; blackish oblique median and posterior fasciae. Hindwings light grey. The larvae are dull whitish-green; spots grey; head blackish; 2 with a blackish-green crescentic plate.

The moth flies in one generation from March to April depending on the location.

The larvae feed on oak, birch, willow, rhododendron plants.
