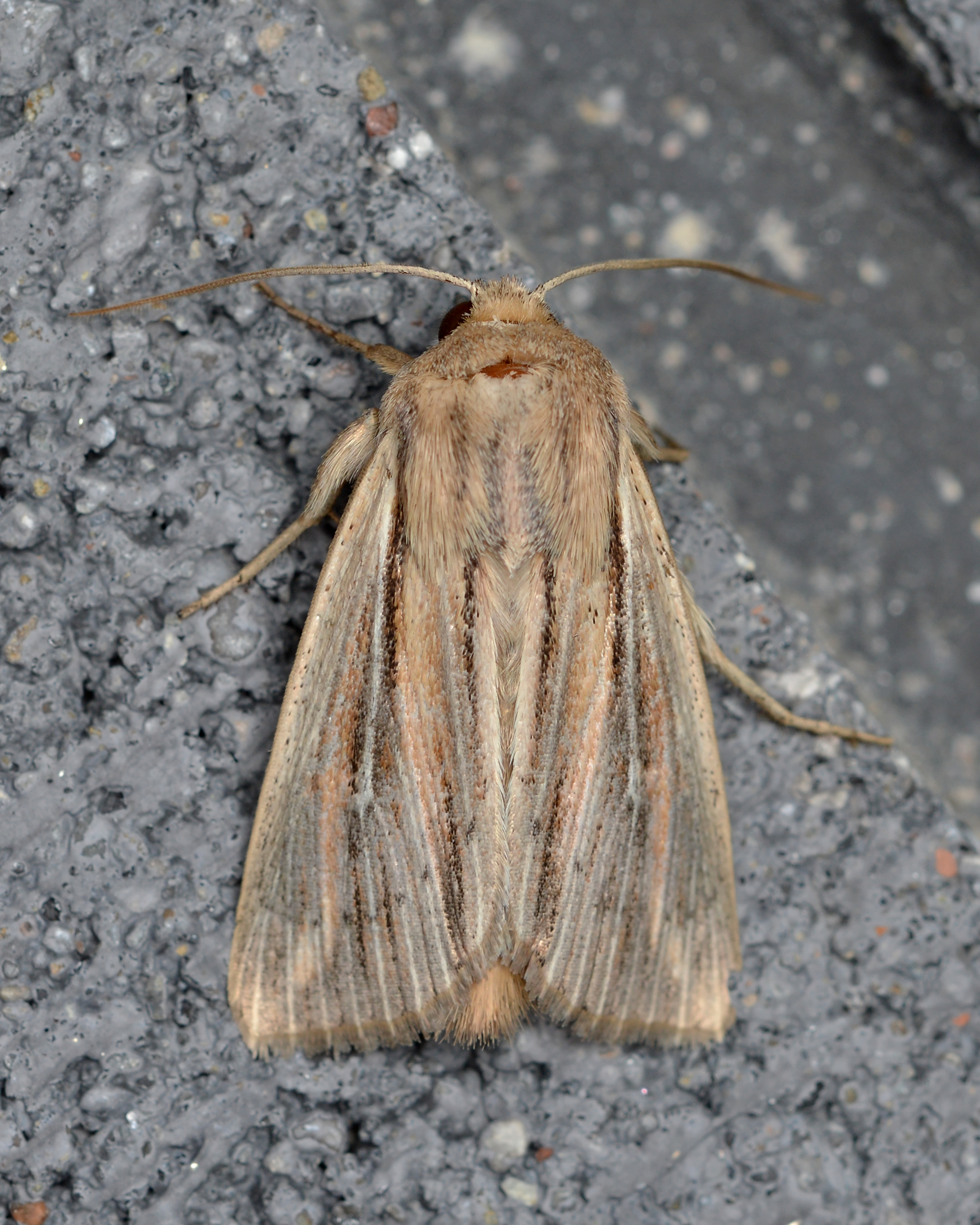

Scientific classification
- Kingdom: Animalia
- Phylum: Arthropoda
- Clade: Pancrustacea
- Class: Insecta
- Order: Lepidoptera
- Superfamily: Noctuoidea
- Family: Noctuidae
- Genus: Leucania
- Species: L. commoides

Binomial name
- Leucania commoides Guenee, 1852

= Leucania commoides =

Species of moth

Leucania commoides, the comma wainscot or two-lined wainscot moth, is a species of cutworm or dart moth in the family Noctuidae. It was described by Achille Guenée in 1852 and is found in North America.

The MONA or Hodges number for Leucania commoides is 10447.
