= List of Stenochiinae genera =

These genera belong to Stenochiinae, a subfamily of darkling beetles in the family Tenebrionidae.

== Stenochiinae genera ==
- Acanthobas Gebien, 1928 (the Neotropics)
- Acanthocamaria Gebien, 1919 (the Neotropics)
- Achariotheca Kaszab, 1970 (Australasia)
- Achrostus Fairmaire, 1891 (tropical Africa)
- Actanorie Bates, 1879 (tropical Africa)
- Aesthetus C.O. Waterhouse, 1890 (the Neotropics)
- Agissopterus Fairmaire, 1884 (the Neotropics)
- Agymnonyx Gebien, 1921 (Australasia)
- Ahexaroptrum Kaszab, 1960 (Indomalaya)
- Ainu Lewis, 1894 (the Palearctic and Indomalaya)
- Alcyonotus Pascoe, 1882 (tropical Africa)
- Alobates Motschulsky, 1872 (North America)
- Amarsenes Bates, 1879 (tropical Africa)
- Amenophis J. Thomson, 1858 (tropical Africa)
- Anachayus Bouchard & Bousquet, 2021 (tropical Africa)
- Andocamaria Masumoto, 1993 (Indomalaya)
- Androsus Gebien, 1921 (Indomalaya and Australasia)
- Anisophaedis Ando, 1993 (Indomalaya)
- Annamosdara Kaszab, 1941 (Indomalaya)
- Apsida Lacordaire, 1859 (North America and the Neotropics)
- Aptereucyrtus Gebien, 1922 (Indomalaya)
- Apterobrachys Kaszab, 1986 (Australasia)
- Apteromaia Kulzer, 1952 (Indomalaya)
- Apteromerus Blair, 1928 (Australasia and Oceania)
- Apterophenus Gebien, 1921 (Australasia and Oceania)
- Apterotheca Gebien, 1921 (Australasia)
- Argobrachium Fairmaire, 1899 (tropical Africa)
- Argutiolana Robiche, 2001 (tropical Africa)
- Artactes Pascoe, 1868 (Indomalaya)
- Asbolodes Fairmaire, 1892 (Indomalaya)
- Asbolodomimus Pic, 1921 (Indomalaya)
- Asemogena Péringuey, 1904 (tropical Africa)
- Asididius Fairmaire, 1869 (tropical Africa)
- Asidobothris Fairmaire, 1886 (tropical Africa)
- Asopidiopsis Kaszab, 1955 (Oceania)
- Asopis Haag-Rutenberg, 1878 (Oceania)
- Astathmetus Bates, 1874 (the Neotropics)
- Augolesthus Motschulsky, 1872 (Indomalaya)
- Azonoderus Harold, 1879 (tropical Africa)
- Baratus Fairmaire, 1897 (Indomalaya)
- Becvarius Masumoto, 1998 (Indomalaya)
- Bionesus Fairmaire, 1879 (Oceania)
- Biroum Kaszab, 1956 (Indomalaya)
- Blapida Perty, 1830 (the Neotropics)
- Borneocamaria Pic, 1917 (Indomalaya)
- Borneosphaerotus Grimm, 2015 (Indomalaya)
- Borneosphena Purchart & Grimm, 2016 (Indomalaya)
- Borneosynopticus Grimm, 2015 (Indomalaya)
- Bothynocara Gebien, 1928 (the Neotropics)
- Bothynocephalus Doyen, 1988 (the Neotropics)
- Bradymerus Perroud & Montrouzier, 1865 (the Palearctic, tropical Africa, Indomalaya, Australasia, and Oceania)
- Bradysphaerotus Kaszab, 1986 (Australasia)
- Brasilius Gebien, 1928 (the Neotropics)
- Bremerianus Masumoto & Becvár, 2005 (Indomalaya)
- Brosimapsida Ferrer & Ødegaard, 2005 (the Neotropics)
- Byzacnus Pascoe, 1866 (tropical Africa)
- Calabosca Fairmaire, 1894 (Indomalaya)
- Calydonella Doyen, 1995 (the Neotropics)
- Calydoniomorpha Pic, 1917 (the Neotropics)
- Calydonis Pascoe, 1882 (the Neotropics)
- Camaria Lepeletier & Audinet-Serville, 1828 (the Neotropics)
- Camarimena Motschulsky, 1863 (Indomalaya)
- Camariocropterum Pic, 1920 (the Neotropics)
- Camariodes Fairmaire, 1869 (tropical Africa)
- Camariomorpha Pic, 1915 (Indomalaya)
- Campolene Pascoe, 1863 (Australasia)
- Campsia Lepeletier & Audinet-Serville, 1828 (the Neotropics)
- Campsiomorpha Pic, 1917 (the Palearctic and Indomalaya)
- Camptobrachys Kaszab, 1941 (Indomalaya)
- Carabelops Fairmaire, 1899 (tropical Africa)
- Caracasa Pic, 1921 (the Neotropics)
- Cataphanus Gebien, 1921 (Australasia)
- Catapiestus Perty, 1831 (Indomalaya)
- Celebesa Pic, 1921 (Australasia)
- Cephalothydemus Pic, 1923 (Indomalaya)
- Cerandrosus Gebien, 1921 (Australasia)
- Cerocamptus Gebien, 1919 (Indomalaya)
- Chaetopsia Gebien, 1925 (Indomalaya)
- Chalcocyclus Fairmaire, 1884 (tropical Africa)
- Chalcopauliana Ardoin, 1961 (tropical Africa)
- Charianus Bates, 1879 (tropical Africa)
- Chariotheca Pascoe, 1860 (Australasia and Oceania)
- Chemolanus Bates, 1879 (tropical Africa)
- Chlorocamma Bates, 1873 (Australasia)
- Choastes Champion, 1893 (the Neotropics)
- Chrysopeplus Gebien, 1942 (Australasia)
- Cibdelis Mannerheim, 1843 (North America)
- Cleomis Fairmaire, 1892 (Indomalaya)
- Cnephalura Doyen, 1988 (the Neotropics)
- Cnodalon Latreille, 1797 (the Neotropics)
- Coelocnemis Mannerheim, 1843 (North America)
- Coelometopus Solier, 1848 (the Palearctic)
- Cophodema Gebien, 1943 (the Neotropics)
- Cryptobates Fairmaire, 1882 (Indomalaya)
- Cryptobatoides Kaszab, 1941 (Indomalaya)
- Cryptobrachys Kaszab, 1941 (Indomalaya)
- Cryptostenophanes Kaszab, 1941 (Indomalaya)
- Csikiola Kaszab, 1955 (Oceania)
- Cuemus Bouchard, 2000 (Australasia)
- Cuphotes Champion, 1887 (the Neotropics)
- Cybopiestes Reitter, 1917 (the Palearctic)
- Cyclonesus Fairmaire, 1896 (Indomalaya)
- Cyrtosoma Perty, 1830 (the Neotropics)
- Cyrtotyche Pascoe, 1866 (tropical Africa)
- Cyrtotyctus Kolbe, 1897 (tropical Africa)
- Damatris Laporte, 1840 (tropical Africa)
- Danodema Gebien, 1925 (tropical Africa)
- Dauresia Ferrer, 2001 (tropical Africa)
- Dechiustes Blair, 1940 (Oceania)
- Dentatoploedipus Kaszab, 1984 (Indomalaya)
- Deplanchesia Fauvel, 1860 (the Neotropics)
- Derosphaerus J. Thomson, 1858 (the Palearctic, tropical Africa, Indomalaya, and Australasia)
- Diachoriops Ando, 2020 (the Palearctic, Indomalaya, Australasia, and Oceania)
- Dicyrtus Duponchel, 1844 (the Neotropics)
- Diestesoma Péringuey, 1904 (tropical Africa)
- Dinomus Brême, 1842 (the Neotropics)
- Diopethes Pascoe, 1882 (the Neotropics)
- Dioscoridemus Koch, 1970 (tropical Africa)
- Dorelogena Péringuey, 1904 (tropical Africa)
- Drocleana Bates, 1879 (tropical Africa)
- Eccoptostoma Gebien, 1913 (tropical Africa)
- Ectomopsis Fairmaire, 1905 (the Neotropics)
- Elasmocerella Strand, 1935 (the Neotropics)
- Elomosda Bates, 1870 (the Neotropics)
- Epicalla Lacordaire, 1859 (the Neotropics)
- Epiplecta Mäklin, 1867 (the Neotropics)
- Episopus Bates, 1873 (Australasia)
- Eremobatodes Gebien, 1943 (tropical Africa)
- Espites Pascoe, 1882 (Australasia)
- Eucrossoscelis Nakane, 1963 (Indomalaya)
- Eucyrtus Lacordaire, 1859 (Indomalaya)
- Euhemicera Ando, 1996 (Indomalaya)
- Euphloeus Pascoe, 1887 (Indomalaya)
- Eutelonodolinus Robiche, 2007 (tropical Africa)
- Eutelonotus Fairmaire, 1902 (tropical Africa)
- Eutherama Carter, 1914 (Australasia)
- Euthysternum Chatanay, 1915 (tropical Africa)
- Exocolena Gebien, 1914 (Indomalaya)
- Falsandrosus Kaszab, 1980 (Indomalaya)
- Falsobates Kaszab, 1941 (Indomalaya)
- Falsobrachys Kulzer, 1954 (Indomalaya)
- Falsocamaria Pic, 1917 (the Palearctic and Indomalaya)
- Falsocamariodes Ardoin, 1956 (tropical Africa)
- Falsocuphotes Pic, 1918 (the Neotropics)
- Falsodiopethes Pic, 1924 (the Neotropics)
- Falsonannocerus Pic, 1947 (tropical Africa)
- Falsonotostrongylium Kaszab, 1955 (Oceania)
- Falsoperichilus Pic, 1920 (tropical Africa)
- Falsostrongylium Pic, 1915 (the Neotropics)
- Falsozotypus Kaszab, 1980 (Indomalaya)
- Flabellostrongylium Pic, 1938 (the Neotropics)
- Foochounus Pic, 1921 (Indomalaya)
- Freudella Ardoin, 1961 (tropical Africa)
- Gaurobates Gebien, 1928 (the Neotropics)
- Gauromaia Pascoe, 1866 (Indomalaya)
- Gebienella Kaszab, 1941 (Indomalaya)
- Gebienocamaria Masumoto, 1993 (Indomalaya)
- Genateropa Bouchard & Bousquet, 2021 (tropical Africa)
- Gigantopigeus Kaszab, 1984 (Indomalaya)
- Girardocamaria Masumoto, 1993 (Indomalaya)
- Glyptotus Leconte, 1858 (North America and the Neotropics)
- Gnesis Pascoe, 1866 (Indomalaya)
- Gonespites Gebien, 1921 (Australasia)
- Gonospa Champion, 1886 (the Neotropics)
- Graptopezus Gebien, 1921 (Australasia)
- Haplandrus Leconte, 1862 (North America)
- Haporema Fairmaire, 1892 (tropical Africa)
- Hegemona Laporte, 1840 (the Neotropics)
- Heliofugus Guérin-Méneville, 1831 (the Neotropics)
- Hemicera Laporte & Brullé, 1831 (Indomalaya)
- Hemimmedia Gebien, 1928 (the Neotropics)
- Hesiodus Champion, 1885 (the Neotropics)
- Heterostrongylium Kaszab, 1977 (Australasia)
- Hexarhopalus Fairmaire, 1891 (the Palearctic and Indomalaya)
- Hicetaon Champion, 1885 (the Neotropics)
- Holobrachys Fairmaire, 1869 (tropical Africa)
- Holostrongylium Kaszab, 1977 (Indomalaya and Australasia)
- Hoploedipinus Kaszab, 1984 (Indomalaya)
- Hoploedipus Fairmaire, 1898 (Indomalaya)
- Hoplostrongylium Ardoin, 1965 (tropical Africa)
- Hyboproctus Kolbe, 1897 (tropical Africa)
- Hydissus Pascoe, 1869 (Australasia)
- Hypaulax Bates, 1868 (Australasia)
- Hyperchalca Fairmaire, 1869 (tropical Africa)
- Hypocalis Dejean, 1834 (tropical Africa)
- Hypovinsonia Ardoin, 1961 (tropical Africa)
- Ilus Champion, 1885 (the Neotropics)
- Immedia Pascoe, 1882 (the Neotropics)
- Iphthiminus Spilman, 1973 (North America and the Palearctic)
- Iphthimulus Reitter, 1920 (the Palearctic)
- Irianobates Kaszab, 1986 (Australasia)
- Isaminas Champion, 1887 (the Neotropics)
- Isicerdes Champion, 1885 (the Neotropics)
- Isopus Montrouzier, 1860 (Australasia)
- Kabakoviella Kaszab, 1980 (Indomalaya)
- Kaszaba Matthews & Doyen, 1989 (Australasia)
- Lenkous Kaszab, 1973 (the Neotropics)
- Lepidocaulinus Schawaller, Masumoto & Merkl, 2013 (Indomalaya)
- Leprocaulinus Kaszab, 1982 (Indomalaya)
- Lomocnemis Gebien, 1921 (Australasia)
- Lophocnemis Mäklin, 1867 (Indomalaya and Australasia)
- Lordodera Gebien, 1921 (tropical Africa)
- Lycidioides Ando, 2003 (Indomalaya)
- Macropachylesthus Pic, 1923 (Indomalaya)
- Macrostethus Wollaston, 1854 (the Palearctic)
- Mahena Gebien, 1922 (tropical Africa)
- Malayaplamius Masumoto, 1986 (Indomalaya)
- Malaysphena Becvár & Purchart, 2008 (Indomalaya)
- Maracia Gebien, 1919 (the Neotropics)
- Mariepskopia Schawaller, 2012 (tropical Africa)
- Mechanetes C.O. Waterhouse, 1887 (Indomalaya)
- Melobrachys Kaszab, 1960 (Indomalaya)
- Menandris Haag-Rutenberg, 1878 (Oceania)
- Menephilus Mulsant, 1854 (the Palearctic, Indomalaya, and Oceania)
- Mentes Champion, 1893 (the Neotropics)
- Merinus Leconte, 1862 (North America)
- Metisopus Bates, 1873 (Australasia and Oceania)
- Micreuphlaeus Fairmaire, 1897 (Indomalaya)
- Microbradymerus Schawaller, 1999 (Indomalaya)
- Micromenandris Kaszab, 1955 (Oceania)
- Microphenus Gebien, 1921 (Australasia)
- Microsphaerotus Pic, 1928 (Indomalaya)
- Microtocerus Pic, 1918 (the Neotropics)
- Mictopsis Fairmaire, 1899 (tropical Africa)
- Miotodera Fairmaire, 1901 (tropical Africa)
- Misolampidius Solsky, 1875 (the Palearctic and Indomalaya)
- Misolampomorphus Kaszab, 1941 (Indomalaya)
- Misolampus Latreille, 1806 (the Palearctic)
- Mitys Champion, 1885 (the Neotropics)
- Moeon Champion, 1886 (the Neotropics)
- Mophon Champion, 1886 (the Neotropics)
- Moromelas Fairmaire, 1898 (tropical Africa)
- Morphostenophanes Pic, 1925 (the Palearctic and Indomalaya)
- Mrazius Pic, 1925 (the Neotropics)
- Mylaris Pallas, 1781 (the Neotropics)
- Nannalcyon Koch, 1950 (tropical Africa)
- Necrobioides Fairmaire, 1882 (Indomalaya)
- Neoplamius Löbl, Bouchard, Merkl & Bousquet, 2020 (Indomalaya)
- Neoporphyrhyba Ardoin, 1956 (tropical Africa)
- Neotheca Carter, 1930 (Australasia)
- Nesocyrtosoma Marcuzzi, 1976 (the Neotropics)
- Nesosphaerotus Gebien, 1921 (tropical Africa)
- Nodosogylium Pic, 1951 (tropical Africa)
- Nuptis Motschulsky, 1872 (the Neotropics)
- Oeatus Champion, 1885 (the Neotropics)
- Oectosis Pascoe, 1869 (Australasia)
- Oedemutes Pascoe, 1860 (Indomalaya)
- Oenomia Pascoe, 1883 (the Neotropics)
- Oenopion Champion, 1885 (North America and the Neotropics)
- Omolipus Pascoe, 1860 (Australasia)
- Oploptera Chevrolat, 1844 (the Neotropics)
- Osdara Walker, 1858 (Indomalaya and Australasia)
- Osdaroides Kaszab, 1980 (Indomalaya)
- Osternus Fairmaire, 1895 (tropical Africa)
- Othryoneus Champion, 1886 (the Neotropics)
- Otoceromorphus Pic, 1915 (the Neotropics)
- Oxidates Champion, 1886 (the Neotropics)
- Ozaenimorphus Fairmaire, 1882 (tropical Africa)
- Ozotypus Pascoe, 1862 (Indomalaya)
- Pachylesthus Fairmaire, 1897 (Indomalaya)
- Papuamisolampus Kaszab, 1986 (Australasia)
- Paramisolampidius Merkl & Masumoto, 2020 (the Palearctic and Indomalaya)
- Parastrongylium Kaszab, 1977 (Australasia)
- Parimmedia Gebien, 1928 (the Neotropics)
- Paroeatus Gebien, 1928 (the Neotropics)
- Paulianaria Bouchard & Bousquet, 2021 (tropical Africa)
- Perichilus Quedenfeldt, 1885 (tropical Africa)
- Periphanodes Gebien, 1943 (Indomalaya)
- Pezomaia Kulzer, 1952 (Indomalaya)
- Pezophenus Gebien, 1921 (Australasia)
- Phaedis Pascoe, 1866 (Indomalaya)
- Phenus Gebien, 1921 (Australasia)
- Phyllechus Bouchard & Bousquet, 2021 (Indomalaya)
- Phymaeus Pascoe, 1883 (Indomalaya)
- Phymatosoma Laporte & Brullé, 1831 (Indomalaya)
- Picocamaria Masumoto, 1993 (Indomalaya)
- Pigeostrongylium Kaszab, 1984 (Indomalaya)
- Pigeus Gebien, 1919 (Indomalaya)
- Piloxys Fairmaire, 1895 (tropical Africa)
- Plamius Fairmaire, 1896 (the Palearctic and Indomalaya)
- Platycrepis Lacordaire, 1859 (Indomalaya)
- Platyesthus Mäklin, 1878 (the Neotropics)
- Poecilesthus Dejean, 1834 (the Neotropics)
- Poeciltoides Fairmaire, 1896 (tropical Africa)
- Polopinus Casey, 1924 (North America)
- Polposipus Solier, 1848 (tropical Africa)
- Polypleurus Eschscholtz, 1831 (North America)
- Ponapeida Kulzer, 1957 (Oceania)
- Porphyrhyba Fairmaire, 1877 (tropical Africa)
- Postandrosus Kulzer, 1951 (Indomalaya)
- Priocamaria Gebien, 1919 (the Neotropics)
- Promethis Pascoe, 1869 (the Palearctic, tropical Africa, Indomalaya, Australasia, and Oceania)
- Proscorus Fairmaire, 1901 (tropical Africa)
- Pseudabax Kraatz, 1880 (Indomalaya)
- Pseudamarsenes Ardoin, 1955 (tropical Africa)
- Pseudandrosus Kulzer, 1951 (Indomalaya)
- Pseudhadrus Kolbe, 1910 (tropical Africa)
- Pseudimmedia Kulzer, 1958 (the Neotropics)
- Pseudisopus Kulzer, 1957 (Oceania)
- Pseudoblapida Pic, 1917 (the Neotropics)
- Pseudocamaria Bates, 1879 (tropical Africa)
- Pseudochrysomela Pic, 1925 (Indomalaya)
- Pseudoderiles Gebien, 1928 (the Neotropics)
- Pseudogena Fairmaire, 1899 (tropical Africa)
- Pseudonautes Fairmaire, 1892 (the Palearctic and Indomalaya)
- Pseudoperichilus Pic, 1921 (tropical Africa)
- Pseudopigeus Kaszab, 1984 (Indomalaya)
- Pseudothryoneus Pic, 1921 (the Neotropics)
- Pseudotocerus Champion, 1888 (the Neotropics)
- Psilonesogena Bates, 1879 (tropical Africa)
- Psydocamaria Pic, 1923 (Indomalaya)
- Psydomorphus Pic, 1921 (Indomalaya)
- Psydus Pascoe, 1868 (Indomalaya)
- Rehumius Fairmaire, 1893 (Indomalaya)
- Rhopalobates Fairmaire, 1897 (Indomalaya)
- Rhophobas Motschulsky, 1872 (Indomalaya)
- Robustocamaria Pic, 1922 (Indomalaya)
- Sadanaria Ando & Ichiyanagi, 2009 (Indomalaya)
- Saitostrongylium Masumoto, 1996 (Indomalaya)
- Saziches Champion, 1886 (the Neotropics)
- Scotaeus Hope, 1834 (Indomalaya)
- Scotoderus Perroud & Montrouzier, 1865 (Australasia and Oceania)
- Scutopiloxys Pic, 1924 (tropical Africa)
- Simalura Gebien, 1914 (the Palearctic and Indomalaya)
- Sophrobates Fairmaire, 1889 (the Neotropics)
- Sphaerocaulus Fairmaire, 1869 (tropical Africa)
- Sphaeromatris Fairmaire, 1899 (tropical Africa)
- Sphaerotidius Kaszab, 1941 (Indomalaya)
- Sphaerotus W. Kirby, 1819 (the Neotropics)
- Spheneuphloeus Kaszab, 1941 (Indomalaya)
- Sphenolampidius Kaszab, 1941 (Indomalaya)
- Sphenosdara Kaszab, 1941 (Indomalaya)
- Spinepicalla Pic, 1921 (the Neotropics)
- Spinoderosphaerus Pic, 1922 (Indomalaya)
- Srilanka Kaszab, 1980 (Indomalaya)
- Steneucyrtus Fairmaire, 1896 (Indomalaya)
- Stenochinus Motschulsky, 1860 (the Palearctic, tropical Africa, and Indomalaya)
- Stenophanes Solsky, 1876 (the Palearctic)
- Stenothesilea Kulzer, 1951 (Indomalaya and Australasia)
- Sternomaia Kulzer, 1952 (Indomalaya)
- Sthenoboea Champion, 1885 (the Neotropics)
- Strepsius Fairmaire, 1896 (tropical Africa)
- Strongylacanthus Brèthes, 1925 (the Neotropics)
- Strongylium W. Kirby, 1819 (worldwide)
- Styphloeus Kaszab, 1941 (Indomalaya)
- Suarezius Fairmaire, 1895 (tropical Africa)
- Sulpiusoma Ferrer, 2006 (tropical Africa)
- Sundon Pic, 1923 (Indomalaya)
- Sycophantes Kirsch, 1866 (the Neotropics)
- Sycophantomorphus Pic, 1924 (the Neotropics)
- Tabarus Gebien, 1921 (Australasia)
- Taichius Ando, 1996 (Indomalaya)
- Taiwanomenephilus Masumoto, 1986 (Indomalaya)
- Talanus Jacquelin du Val, 1857 (the Neotropics)
- Tanchirus Fairmaire, 1897 (Indomalaya)
- Taphrosoma Kirsch, 1866 (the Neotropics)
- Taraxides C.O. Waterhouse, 1876 (tropical Africa)
- Tearchus Kraatz, 1880 (Indomalaya)
- Teles Mulsant & Godart, 1876 (the Palearctic)
- Telethrus Pascoe, 1882 (the Neotropics)
- Telleus Fairmaire, 1904 (the Neotropics)
- Temnoaphelus Ferrer, 1988 (tropical Africa)
- Temnophthalmus Gebien, 1921 (tropical Africa)
- Tenebriocamaria Pic, 1919 (the Neotropics)
- Tenebriopsis Gebien, 1928 (the Neotropics)
- Tenesis Duvivier, 1892 (tropical Africa)
- Tentyriopsis Gebien, 1928 (the Neotropics)
- Tetragonomenes Chevrolat, 1878 (the Palearctic, Indomalaya, and Australasia)
- Tetraphyllus Laporte & Brullé, 1831 (the Palearctic and Indomalaya)
- Thecacerus Lacordaire, 1859 (the Neotropics)
- Theresea Pic, 1917 (Indomalaya)
- Thesilea Haag-Rutenberg, 1878 (Indomalaya, Australasia, and Oceania)
- Thettea Bates, 1879 (tropical Africa)
- Thydemorphus Pic, 1918 (Indomalaya)
- Tonkinius Fairmaire, 1903 (Indomalaya)
- Toxocnema Fåhraeus, 1870 (tropical Africa)
- Trichodamatris Chatanay, 1915 (tropical Africa)
- Uenomisolampidius Masumoto, 1996 (Indomalaya)
- Uenostrongylium Masumoto, 1999 (Indomalaya)
- Upis Fabricius, 1792 (North America and the Palearctic)
- Xanthobates Gebien, 1928 (the Neotropics)
- Xantusiella Kaszab, 1941 (Indomalaya)
- Xenius Champion, 1886 (the Neotropics)
- Xylopinus Leconte, 1862 (North America)
- Zabroideus Fairmaire, 1894 (the Palearctic)
- Zophius Dejean, 1834 (tropical Africa)
- Zophophilus Fairmaire, 1881 (Indomalaya and Australasia)
- † Anthracohelops Haupt, 1950
- † Caryosoma Haupt, 1950
- † Eodromus Haupt, 1950
- † Mimohelops Haupt, 1950
- † Parakeleusticus Haupt, 1950
- † Pseudohelops Haupt, 1950
- † Pyrochalcaspis Haupt, 1950
