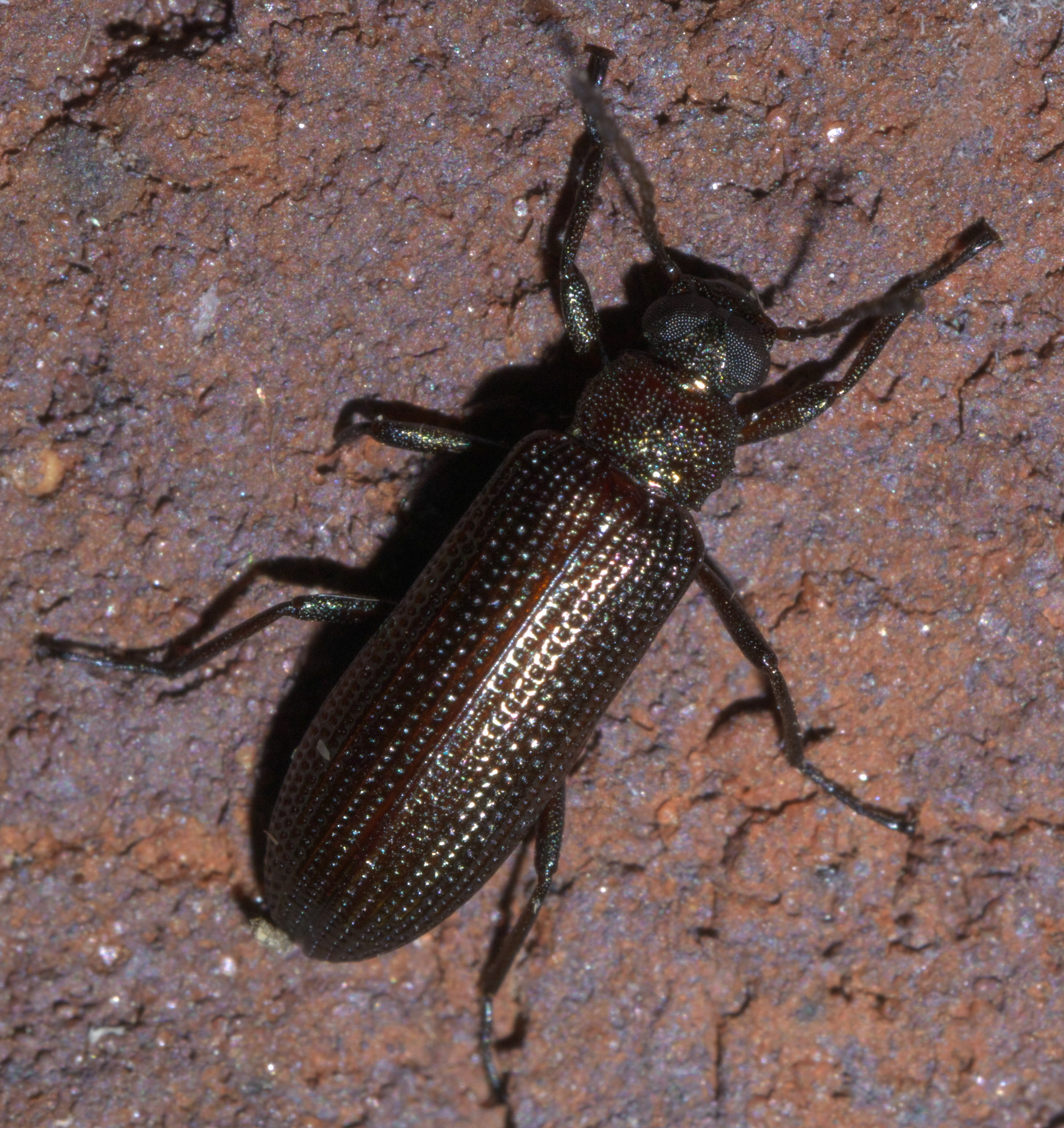
- Strongylium crenatum

Scientific classification
- Kingdom: Animalia
- Phylum: Arthropoda
- Clade: Pancrustacea
- Class: Insecta
- Order: Coleoptera
- Suborder: Polyphaga
- Infraorder: Cucujiformia
- Family: Tenebrionidae
- Subfamily: Stenochiinae; Kirby, 1837

= Stenochiinae =

Subfamily of beetles

Stenochiinae is a subfamily of darkling beetles in the family Tenebrionidae. There are more than 390 genera in Stenochiinae.

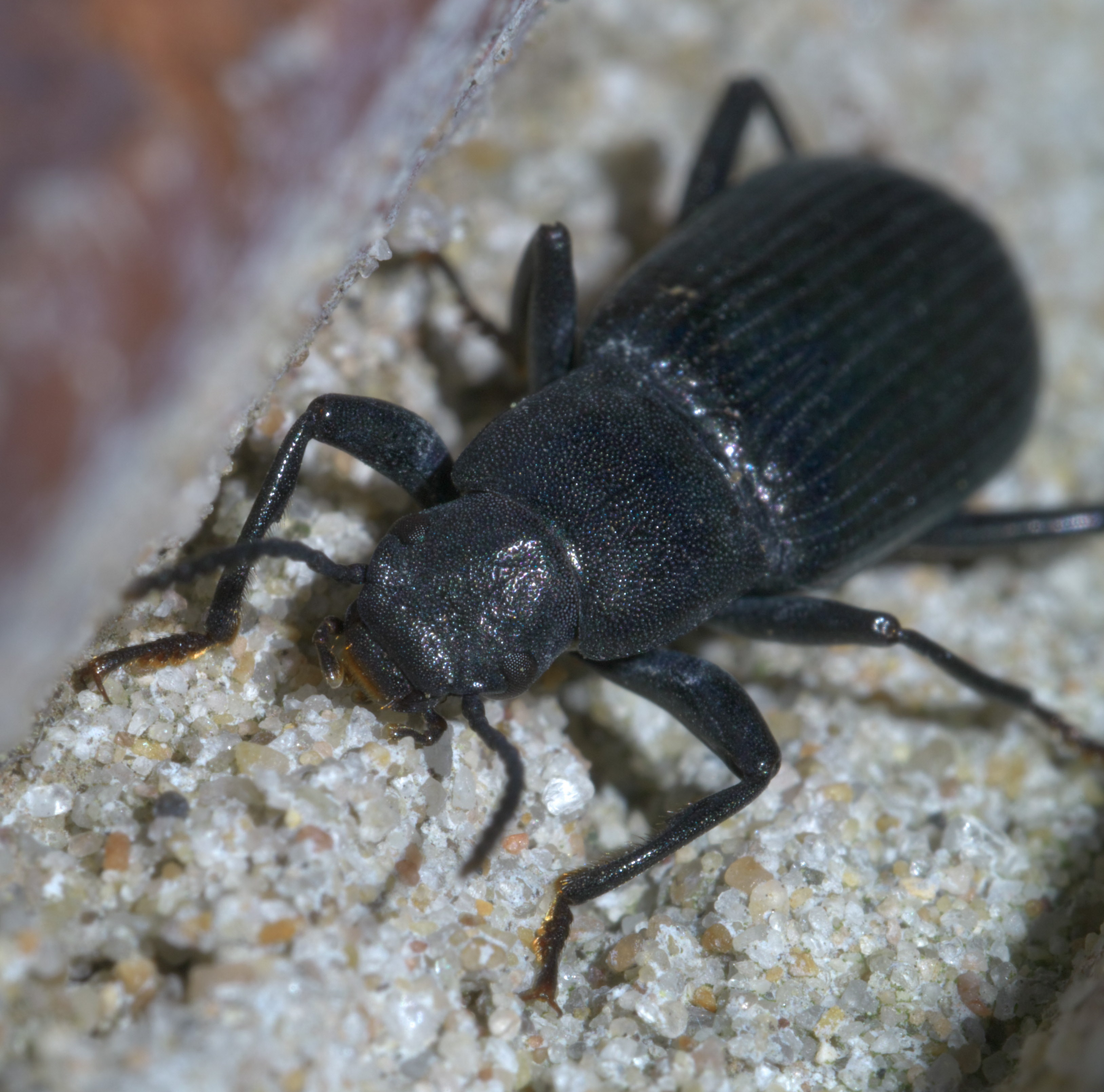
Xylopinus saperdoides

== Tribes and selected genera ==
BioLib includes 3 tribes:

=== Cnodalonini ===
Authority: Oken, 1843: over 340 genera including:

- Alobates Motschoulsky, 1872
- Catapiestus Perty, 1831
- Coelocnemis Mannerheim, 1843
- Cnodalon Latreille, 1796
- Cyrtosoma Perty, 1830
- Iphthiminus Spilman, 1973
- Merinus Leconte, 1862
- Oenopion Champion, 1885
- Upis Fabricius, 1792
- Xylopinus Leconte, 1862

=== Stenochiini ===
Authority: Kirby, 1837

1. Agissopterus Fairmaire, 1897
2. Asemogena Péringuey, 1904
3. Azonoderus Harold, 1879
4. Bionesus Fairmaire, 1879
5. Bremerianus Masumoto & Bečvář, 2005
6. Cuphotes Champion, 1887
7. Dauresia (beetle) Ferrer, 2001
8. Dicyrtus Duponchel, 1844
9. Diestesoma Péringuey, 1904
10. Dorelogena Péringuey, 1904
11. Elasmocerella Strand, 1935
12. Epiplecta Mäklin, 1867
13. Eucrossoscelis Nakane, 1963
14. Eutherama Carter, 1914
15. Falsocuphotes Pic, 1918
16. Falsonotostrongylium Kaszab, 1955
17. Falsostrongylium Pic, 1915
18. Flabellostrongylium Pic, 1938
19. Freudella Ardoin, 1961
20. Genateropa Bouchard & Bousquet, 2021
21. Heterostrongylium Kaszab, 1977
22. Holostrongylium Kaszab, 1977
23. Hoplostrongylium Ardoin, 1965
24. Hyperchalca Fairmaire, 1869
25. Lophocnemis Mäklin, 1867
26. Mentes (beetle) Champion, 1893
27. Microtocerus Pic, 1918
28. Mictopsis Fairmaire, 1899
29. Miotodera Fairmaire, 1901
30. Nodosogylium Pic, 1951
31. Oenomia Pascoe, 1883
32. Oploptera Chevrolat in Guérin-Méneville, 1844
33. Otoceromorphus Pic, 1915
34. Parastrongylium Kaszab, 1977
35. Phyllechus Bouchard & Bousquet, 2021
36. Phymatosoma Laporte de Castelnau & Brullé, 1831
37. Platyesthus Mäklin, 1878
38. Poecilesthus Dejean, 1834
39. Pseudogena Fairmaire, 1899
40. Pseudotocerus Champion, 1888
41. Psilonesogena Bates, 1879
42. Saitostrongylium Masumoto, 1996
43. Strongylacanthus Brèthes, 1925
44. Strongylium Kirby, 1819
45. Theresea Pic, 1917
46. Uenostrongylium Masumoto, 1999

=== Talanini ===
Authority: Champion, 1887 (1883) - monotypic:

1. Talanus DuVal, 1856

=== Unplaced genera ===
1. Nestorinus Guerrero, Vidal & Zuniga-Reinoso, 2021
