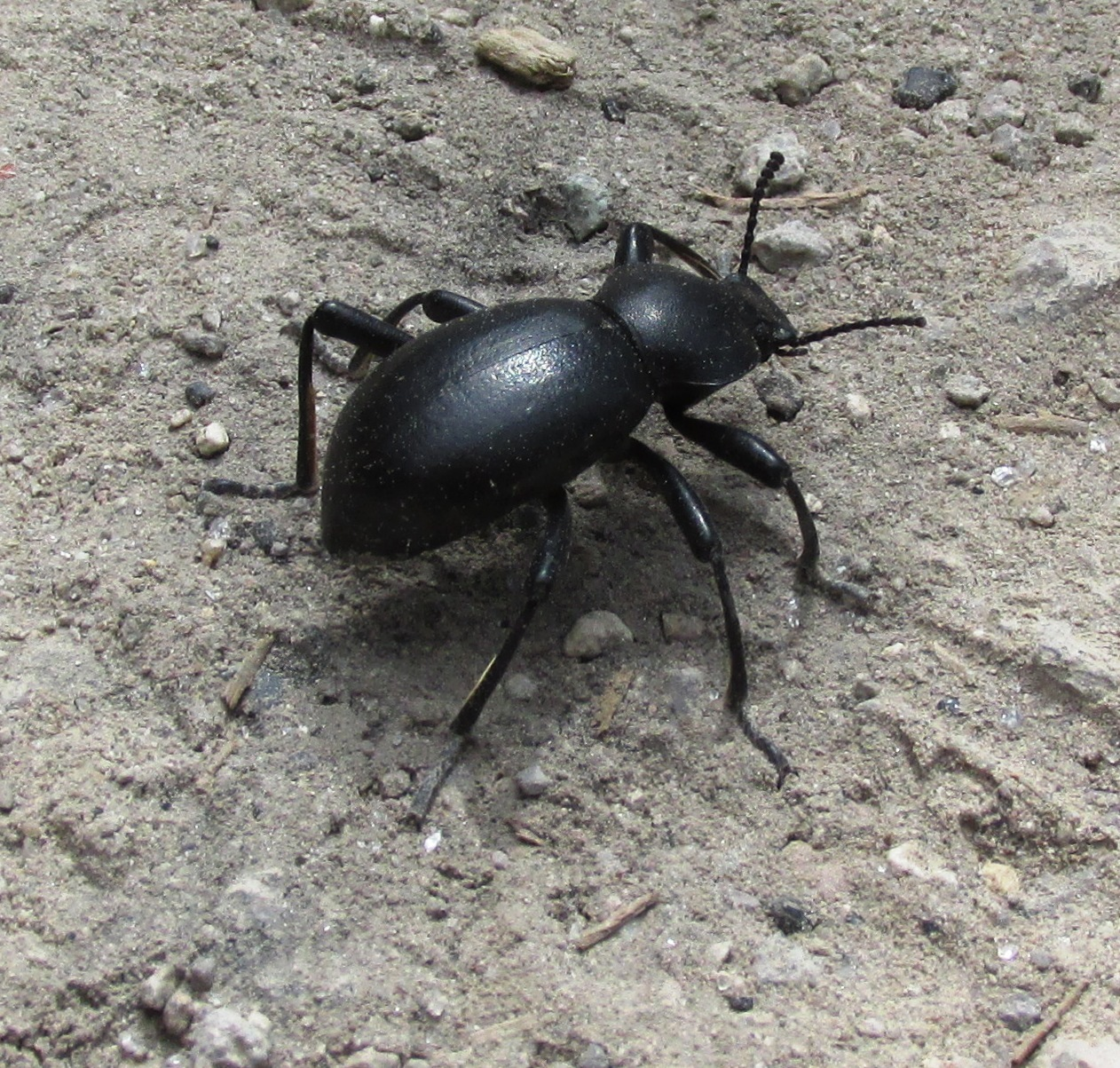

Scientific classification
- Kingdom: Animalia
- Phylum: Arthropoda
- Class: Insecta
- Order: Coleoptera
- Suborder: Polyphaga
- Infraorder: Cucujiformia
- Family: Tenebrionidae
- Subfamily: Stenochiinae
- Tribe: Cnodalonini
- Genus: Coelocnemis
- Species: C. dilaticollis

Binomial name
- Coelocnemis dilaticollis Mannerheim, 1843

= Coelocnemis dilaticollis =

Species of beetle

Coelocnemis dilaticollis, the California broad-necked darkling beetle, is a species of darkling beetle in the family Tenebrionidae. It is found mainly in the western United States and western Canada.
