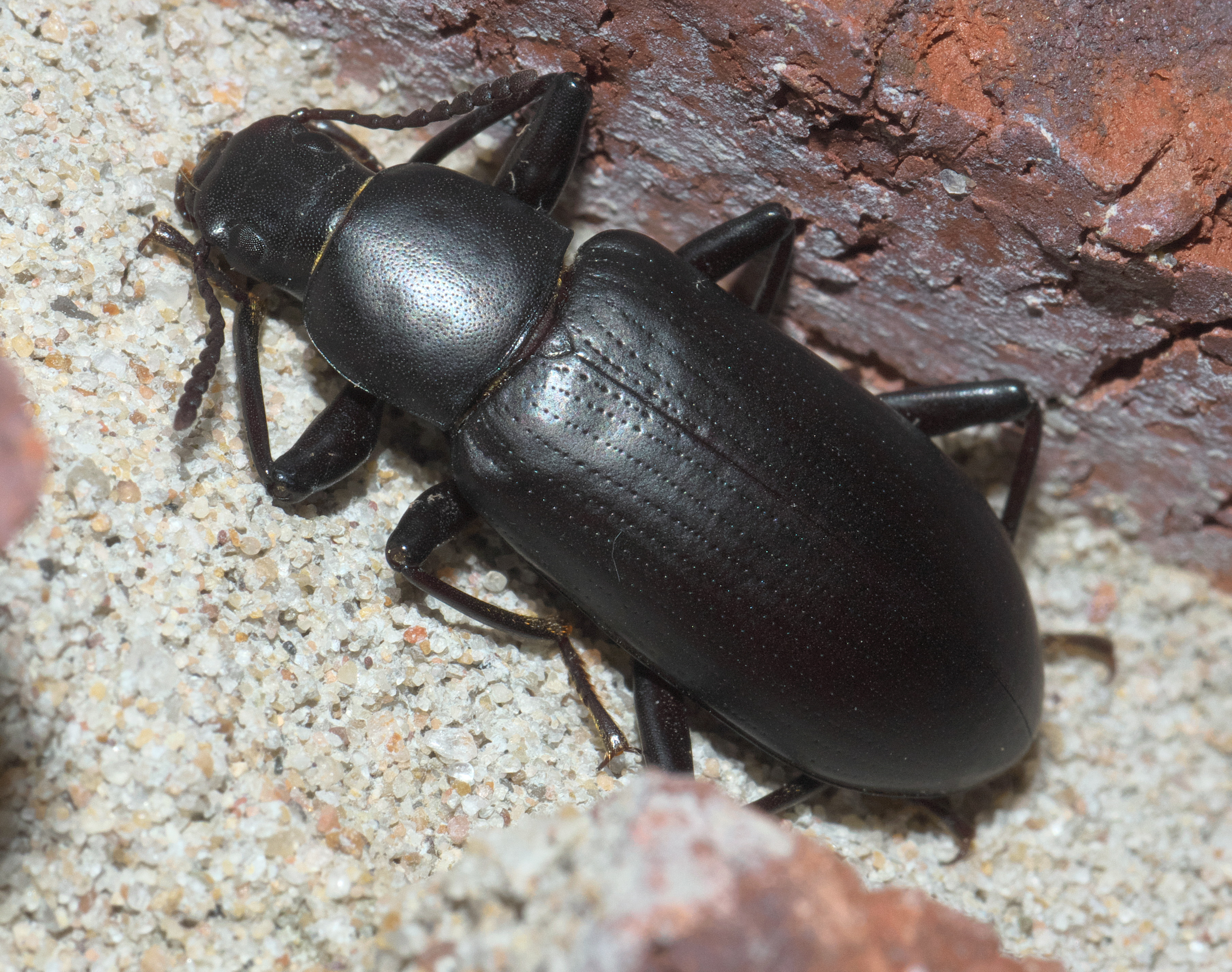
- Alobates pensylvanica

Scientific classification
- Kingdom: Animalia
- Phylum: Arthropoda
- Clade: Pancrustacea
- Class: Insecta
- Order: Coleoptera
- Suborder: Polyphaga
- Infraorder: Cucujiformia
- Family: Tenebrionidae
- Subfamily: Stenochiinae
- Tribe: Cnodalonini; Oken, 1843

Synonyms
- Camariinae Gebien, 1917; Coelometopina Lacordaire, 1859; Coelometopini Lacordaire, 1859; Coelometopini Lacordaire, 1859; Eutelini Lacordaire, 1859

= Cnodalonini =

Tribe of beetles

Cnodalonini is a tribe of darkling beetles in the family Tenebrionidae. There are over 340 genera in Cnodalonini.

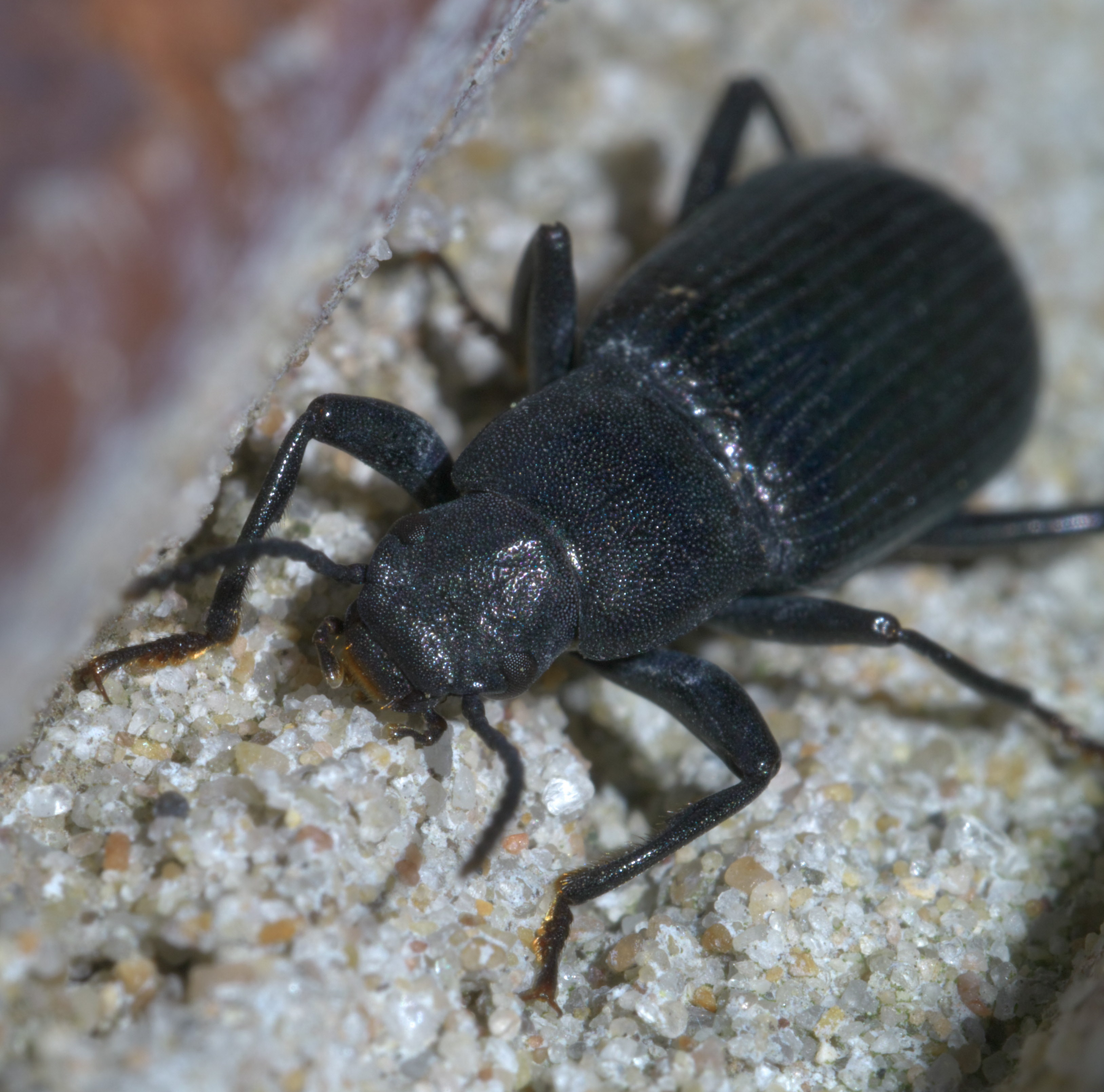
Xylopinus saperdoides

== Genera ==
BioLib includes:

1. Acanthobas Gebien, 1928
2. Acanthocamaria Gebien, 1917
3. Achariotheca Kaszab, 1970
4. Achrostus Fairmaire, 1891
5. Actanorie Bates, 1879
6. Aesthetus Waterhouse, 1890
7. Agymnonyx Gebien, 1920
8. Ahexaroptrum Kaszab, 1960
9. Ainu Lewis, 1894
10. Alcyonotus Pascoe, 1882
11. Allopezus Gebien, 1921
12. Alobates Motschoulsky, 1872
13. Amarsenes Bates, 1879
14. Amenophis Thomson, 1858
15. Anachayus Bouchard & Bousquet in Bouchard, Bousquet, Aalbu, Alonso-Zarazaga, Merkl & Davies, 2021
16. Andocamaria Masumoto, 1993
17. Androsus Gebien, 1920
18. Anisophaedis Ando, 1993
19. Annamosdara Kaszab, 1941
20. Apsida Lacordaire, 1859
21. Aptereucyrtus Gebien, 1921
22. Apterobrachys Kaszab, 1986
23. Apteromaia Kulzer, 1952
24. Apteromerus Blair, 1928
25. Apterophenus Gebien, 1921
26. Apterotheca Gebien, 1920
27. Argobrachium Fairmaire, 1899
28. Argutiolana Robiche, 2001
29. Artactes Pascoe, 1868
30. Asbolodes Fairmaire, 1893
31. Asididius Fairmaire, 1869
32. Asidobothris Fairmaire, 1886
33. Asopidiopsis Kaszab, 1955
34. Asopis Haag-Rutenberg, 1878
35. Astathmetus Bates, 1874
36. Augolesthus Motschoulsky, 1873
37. Baratus Fairmaire, 1896
38. Becvarius Masumoto, 1998
39. Biroum Kaszab, 1956
40. Blapida Perty, 1830
41. Borneocamaria Pic, 1917
42. Borneosphaena Purchart & Grimm, 2016
43. Borneosphaerotus Grimm, 2015
44. Borneosynopticus Grimm, 2015
45. Bothynocara Gebien, 1928
46. Bothynocephalus Doyen, 1987
47. Bradymerus Perroud, 1864
48. Bradysphaerotus Kaszab, 1986
49. Brasilius Gebien, 1928
50. Brosimapsida Ferrer & Ødegaard, 2005
51. Byzacnus Pascoe, 1866
52. Calabosca Fairmaire, 1894
53. Calydonella Doyen, 1995
54. Calydoniomorpha Pic, 1917
55. Calydonis Pascoe, 1882
56. Camaria Lepeletier & Audinet-Serville, 1825
57. Camarimena Motschulsky, 1863
58. Camariocropteron Pic, 1920
59. Camariodes Fairmaire, 1869
60. Camariomorpha Pic, 1915
61. Campolene Pascoe, 1863
62. Campsia Lepeletier & Audinet-Serville, 1828
63. Campsiomorpha Pic, 1917
64. Camptobrachys Kaszab, 1941
65. Carabelops Fairmaire, 1899
66. Caracasa Pic, 1921
67. Cataphanus Gebien, 1921
68. Catapiestus Perty, 1831
69. Celebesa Pic, 1921
70. Cephalothydemus Pic, 1923
71. Cerandrosus Gebien, 1921
72. Cerocamptus Gebien, 1919
73. Chaetopsia Gebien, 1925
74. Chalcocyclus Fairmaire, 1884
75. Chalcopauliana Ardoin, 1961
76. Charianus Bates, 1879
77. Chariotheca Pascoe, 1860
78. Chemolanus Bates, 1879
79. Chlorocamma Bates, 1873
80. Choastes Champion, 1893
81. Chrysopeplus Gebien, 1942
82. Cibdelis Mannerheim, 1843
83. Cleomis Fairmaire, 1893
84. Cnephalura Doyen, 1988
85. Cnodalon Latreille, 1796
86. Coelocnemis Mannerheim, 1843
87. Coelometopus Solier, 1848
88. Cophodema Gebien, 1943
89. Cryptobates Fairmaire, 1882
90. Cryptobatoides Kaszab, 1941
91. Cryptobrachys Kaszab, 1941
92. Cryptostenophanes Kaszab, 1941
93. Csikiola Kaszab, 1955
94. Cuemus Bouchard, 2000
95. Cybopiestes Reitter, 1917
96. Cyclonesus Fairmaire, 1896
97. Cyrtosoma Perty, 1830
98. Cyrtotyche Pascoe, 1866
99. Cyrtotyctus Kolbe in Stuhlmann, 1897
100. Damatris Laporte, 1840
101. Danodema Gebien, 1925
102. Dechiustes Blair, 1940
103. Dentatoploedipus Kaszab, 1984
104. Deplanchesia Fauvel, 1860
105. Derosphaerus Thomson, 1858
106. Diachoriops Ando, 2020
107. Dinomus Brême, 1842
108. Diopethes Pascoe, 1882
109. Dioscoridemus Koch, 1970
110. Drocleana Bates, 1879
111. Eccoptostoma Gebien, 1913
112. Ectomopsis Fairmaire, 1905
113. Elomosda Bates, 1870
114. Epicalla Champion, 1886
115. Episopus Bates, 1873
116. Eremobatodes Gebien, 1943
117. Espites Pascoe, 1882
118. Eucyrtus Pascoe, 1866
119. Euhemicera Ando, 1996
120. Euphloeus Pascoe, 1887
121. Eutelonodolinus Robiche, 2007
122. Eutelonotus Fairmaire, 1902
123. Euthysternum Chatanay, 1915
124. Exocolena Gebien, 1914
125. Falsandrosus Kaszab, 1980
126. Falsobates Kaszab, 1941
127. Falsobrachys Kulzer, 1954
128. Falsocamaria Pic, 1917
129. Falsocamariodes Ardoin, 1956
130. Falsodiopethes Pic, 1924
131. Falsonannocerus Pic, 1947
132. Falsoperichilus Pic, 1920
133. Falsozotypus Kaszab, 1980
134. Foochounus Pic, 1921
135. Gaurobates Gebien, 1928
136. Gauromaia Pascoe, 1866
137. Gebienella Kaszab, 1941
138. Gebienocamaria Masumoto, 1993
139. Gigantopigeus Kaszab, 1984
140. Girardocamaria Masumoto, 1993
141. Glyptotus LeConte, 1858
142. Gnesis Pascoe, 1866
143. Gonespites Gebien, 1921
144. Gonospa Champion, 1886
145. Graptopezus Gebien, 1921
146. Haplandrus LeConte, 1862
147. Haporema Fairmaire, 1892
148. Hegemona Laporte, 1840
149. Heliofugus Guérin-Méneville, 1830
150. Hemicera Laporte & Brullé, 1831
151. Hemimmedia Gebien, 1928
152. Hesiodus Champion, 1885
153. Hexarhopalus Fairmaire, 1891
154. Hicetaon (beetle) Champion, 1885
155. Holobrachys Fairmaire, 1869
156. Hoploedipinus Kaszab, 1984
157. Hoploedipus Fairmaire, 1898
158. Hyboproctus Kolbe, 1897
159. Hydissus (beetle) Pascoe, 1869
160. Hypaulax Bates, 1868
161. Hypocalis Dejean, 1834
162. Hypoproctus Kolbe in Stuhlmann, 1897
163. Hypovinsonia Ardoin, 1961
164. Ilus (beetle) Champion, 1885
165. Immedia Pascoe, 1882
166. Iphthiminus Spilman, 1973
167. Iphthimulus Reitter, 1920
168. Irianobates Kaszab, 1986
169. Isaminas Champion, 1887
170. Isicerdes Champion, 1885
171. Isopus Montrouzier, 1860
172. Kabakoviella Kaszab, 1980
173. Kaszaba Matthews & Doyen, 1989
174. Lenkous Kaszab, 1973
175. Lepidocaulinus Schawaller, Masumoto & Merkl, 2013
176. Lepidomysticus Schawaller & Bellersheim, 2023
177. Lomocnemis Gebien, 1921
178. Lordodera Gebien, 1921
179. Lycidioides Ando, 2003
180. Macropachylesthus Pic, 1923
181. Macrophthalmata Strand, 1935
182. Macrostethus Wollaston, 1854
183. Mahena Gebien, 1922
184. Malayaplamius Masumoto, 1986
185. Malaysphena Bečvář & Purchart, 2008
186. Maracia Gebien, 1919
187. Mariepskopia Schawaller, 2012
188. Mechanetes Waterhouse, 1887
189. Melobrachys Kaszab, 1960
190. Menandris Haag-Rutenberg, 1878
191. Menephilus Mulsant, 1854
192. Merinus (beetle) LeConte, 1862
193. Metisopus Bates, 1873
194. Micreuphlaeus Fairmaire, 1897
195. Microbradymerus Schawaller, 1999
196. Micromenandris Kaszab, 1955
197. Microphenus Gebien, 1921
198. Microsphaerotus Pic, 1928
199. Misolampidius Solsky, 1875
200. Misolampomorphus Kaszab, 1941
201. Misolampus Latreille, 1807
202. Mitys Champion, 1885
203. Moeon Champion, 1886
204. Mophon Champion, 1886
205. Moromelas Fairmaire, 1898
206. Morphostenophanes Pic, 1925
207. Mrazius Pic, 1925
208. Mylaris Pallas, 1781
209. Nannalcyon Koch, 1950
210. Necrobioides Fairmaire, 1882
211. Neoplamius Löbl, Bouchard, Merkl & Bousquet, 2020
212. Neoporphyrhyba Ardoin, 1956
213. Neotheca Carter, 1930
214. Nesocyrtosoma Marcuzzi, 1976
215. Nesosphaerotus Gebien, 1921
216. Nuptis Motschulsky, 1872
217. Oeatus Champion, 1885
218. Oectosis Pascoe, 1869
219. Oedemutes Pascoe, 1860
220. Oenopion (beetle) Champion, 1885
221. Omolipus Pascoe, 1860
222. Osdara Walker, 1858
223. Osdaroides Kaszab, 1980
224. Osternus Fairmaire, 1895
225. Othryoneus (beetle) Champion, 1886
226. Oxidates Champion, 1886
227. Ozaenimorphus Fairmaire, 1882
228. Ozotypus Pascoe, 1862
229. Pachylesthus Fairmaire, 1897
230. Papuamisolampus Kaszab, 1986
231. Paramisolampidius Nakane, 1968
232. Parimmedia Gebien, 1928
233. Paroeatus Gebien, 1928
234. Paulianaria Bouchard & Bousquet, 2021
235. Perichilus Quedenfeldt, 1885
236. Periphanodes Gebien, 1943
237. Pezomaia Kulzer, 1952
238. Pezophenus Gebien, 1921
239. Phaedis Pascoe, 1866
240. Phenus Gebien, 1921
241. Phymaeus Pascoe, 1883
242. Picocamaria Masumoto, 1993
243. Pigeostrongylium Kaszab, 1984
244. Pigeus Gebien, 1919
245. Piloxys Fairmaire, 1895
246. Plamius Fairmaire, 1896
247. Platycrepis Lacordaire, 1859
248. Poeciltoides Fairmaire, 1896
249. Polopinus Casey, 1924
250. Polposipus Solier in Baudi & Truqui, 1848
251. Polypleurus Eschscholtz, 1831
252. Ponapeida Kulzer, 1957
253. Porphyrhyba Fairmaire, 1877
254. Postandrosus Kulzer, 1951
255. Priocamaria Gebien, 1919
256. Promethis Pascoe, 1869
257. Proscorus Fairmaire, 1901
258. Pseudabax Kraatz, 1880
259. Pseudamarsenes Ardoin, 1955
260. Pseudandrosus Kulzer, 1951
261. Pseudhadrus Kolbe, 1910
262. Pseudimmedia Kulzer, 1958
263. Pseudisopus Kulzer, 1957
264. Pseudoblapida Pic, 1917
265. Pseudocamaria Bates, 1879
266. Pseudochrysomela Pic, 1925
267. Pseudoderiles Gebien, 1928
268. Pseudonautes Fairmaire, 1892
269. Pseudoperichilus Pic, 1921
270. Pseudopigeus Kaszab, 1984
271. Pseudothryoneus Pic, 1921
272. Psydocamaria Pic, 1923
273. Psydomorphus Pic, 1921
274. Psydus Pascoe, 1868
275. Rehumius Fairmaire, 1893
276. Rhopalobates Fairmaire, 1897
277. Rhophobas Motschulsky, 1872
278. Robustocamaria Pic, 1922
279. Sadanaria Ando & Ichiyanagi, 2009
280. Saziches Champion, 1886
281. Scotaeus Hope, 1834
282. Scotoderus Perroud, 1864
283. Scutopiloxys Pic, 1924
284. Simalura Gebien, 1914
285. Sophrobates Fairmaire, 1889
286. Sphaerocaulus Fairmaire, 1869
287. Sphaeromatris Fairmaire, 1899
288. Sphaerotidius Kaszab, 1941
289. Sphaerotus W. Kirby, 1819
290. Spheneuphloeus Kaszab, 1941
291. Sphenolampidius Kaszab, 1941
292. Sphenosdara Kaszab, 1941
293. Spinepicalla Pic, 1921
294. Spinoderosphaerus Pic, 1922
295. Srilanka (beetle) Kaszab, 1980
296. Steneucyrtus Fairmaire, 1896
297. Stenochinus Motschulsky, 1860
298. Stenophanes Solsky, 1875
299. Stenothesilea Kulzer, 1951
300. Sternomaia Kulzer, 1952
301. Sthenoboea Champion, 1885
302. Strepsius Fairmaire, 1896
303. Styphloeus Kaszab, 1941
304. Suarezius Fairmaire, 1895
305. Sulpiusoma Ferrer, 2006
306. Sundon (beetle) Pic, 1923
307. Sycophantes Kirsch, 1866
308. Sycophantomorphus Pic, 1924
309. Tabarus Gebien, 1920
310. Taichius Ando, 1996
311. Taiwanomenephilus Masumoto, 1986
312. Tanchirus Fairmaire, 1897
313. Taphrosoma Kirsch, 1866
314. Taraxides C.O. Waterhouse, 1876
315. Tearchus Kraatz, 1880
316. Teles (beetle) Mulsant & Godart, 1876
317. Telethrus Pascoe, 1882
318. Telleus Fairmaire, 1904
319. Temnoaphelus Ferrer, 1988
320. Temnophthalmus Gebien, 1921
321. Tenebriocamaria Pic, 1919
322. Tenebriopsis Gebien, 1928
323. Tenesis Duvivier, 1892
324. Tentyriopsis Gebien, 1928
325. Tetragonomenes Chevrolat, 1878
326. Tetraphyllus Laporte de Castelnau & Brullé, 1831
327. Thecacerus Lacordaire, 1859
328. Thesilea Haag-Rutenberg, 1878
329. Thettea Bates, 1879
330. Thydemorphus Pic, 1918
331. Tonkinius Fairmaire, 1903
332. Toxocnema Fåhraeus, 1870
333. Trichodamatris Chatanay, 1915
334. Uenomisolampidius Matsumotu, 1996
335. Upis Fabricius, 1792
336. Xanthobates Gebien, 1928
337. Xantusiella Kaszab, 1941
338. Xenius Champion, 1886
339. Xylopinus LeConte, 1862
340. Zabroideus Fairmaire, 1894
341. Zophius de Brême, 1842
342. Zophophilus Fairmaire, 1881

Note: misplaced or pre-occupied:

- Leprocaulinus Kaszab, 1982
