= C4H10O4 =

The molecular formula C_{4}H_{10}O_{4} (molar mass: 122.12 g/mol) may refer to:

- Erythritol, a sugar alcohol (or polyol) food additive
- Threitol, a four-carbon sugar alcohol; the diastereomer of erythritol
