= Erythrulose reductase =

Class of enzymes

erythrulose reductase

Identifiers
- EC no.: 1.1.1.162
- CAS no.: 52064-49-0

Databases
- IntEnz: IntEnz view
- BRENDA: BRENDA entry
- ExPASy: NiceZyme view
- KEGG: KEGG entry
- MetaCyc: metabolic pathway
- PRIAM: profile
- PDB structures: RCSB PDB PDBe PDBsum
- Gene Ontology: AmiGO / QuickGO
Search
- PMC: articles
- PubMed: articles
- NCBI: proteins

In enzymology, erythrulose reductase (EC 1.1.1.162) is an enzyme that catalyzes the chemical reaction

D-threitol
+ NADP^{+}
H^{+}
H^{+}
D-erythrulose
+ NADPH

The two substrates of this enzyme are D-threitol and oxidised nicotinamide adenine dinucleotide phosphate (NADP^{+}). Its products are D-erythrulose, reduced NADPH, and a proton.

This enzyme belongs to the family of oxidoreductases, specifically those acting on the CH-OH group of donor with NAD^{+} or NADP^{+} as acceptor. The systematic name of this enzyme class is erythritol:NADP^{+} oxidoreductase. This enzyme is also called D-erythrulose reductase.
