= Osdara =

Scientific classification
- Kingdom: Animalia
- Phylum: Arthropoda
- Clade: Pancrustacea
- Class: Insecta
- Order: Coleoptera
- Suborder: Polyphaga
- Infraorder: Cucujiformia
- Family: Tenebrionidae
- Subfamily: Stenochiinae
- Tribe: Cnodalonini
- Genus: Osdara; Walker, 1858

Genus of beetles

Osdara is a genus of darkling beetles in the tribe Cnodalonini, erected by Francis Walker in 1858.
