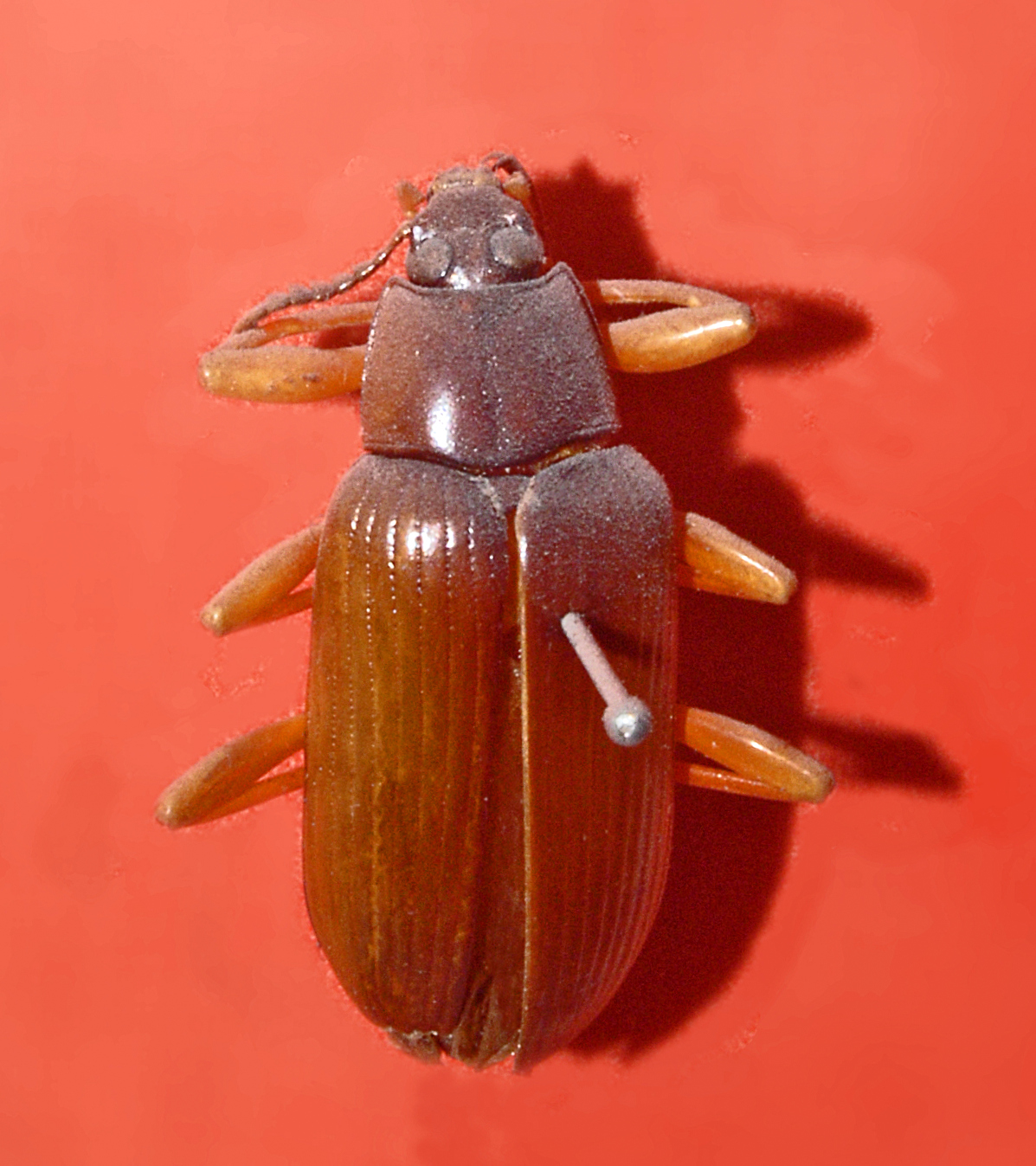
- Scotaeus corallipes. Museum specimen

Scientific classification
- Kingdom: Animalia
- Phylum: Arthropoda
- Clade: Pancrustacea
- Class: Insecta
- Order: Coleoptera
- Suborder: Polyphaga
- Infraorder: Cucujiformia
- Family: Tenebrionidae
- Genus: Scotaeus
- Species: S. corallipes

Binomial name
- Scotaeus corallipes Hope, 1834

= Scotaeus corallipes =

Species of beetle

Scotaeus corallipes is a species of darkling beetles in the family Tenebrionidae.

== Distribution ==
This species can be found in Java, Borneo and Sumatra.
