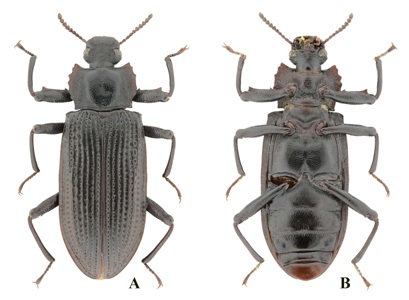

Scientific classification
- Domain: Eukaryota
- Kingdom: Animalia
- Phylum: Arthropoda
- Class: Insecta
- Order: Coleoptera
- Suborder: Polyphaga
- Infraorder: Cucujiformia
- Family: Tenebrionidae
- Genus: Catapiestus
- Species: C. bispinosus

Binomial name
- Catapiestus bispinosus Yang & Guo, 2018

= Catapiestus bispinosus =

Species of beetle

Catapiestus bispinosus is a species of beetle of the Tenebrionidae family. This species is found in China (Guizhou, Fujian, Guangxi, Sichuan, Yunnan).

Adults are reddish brown to black and reach a length of 12.9–14.9 mm.
