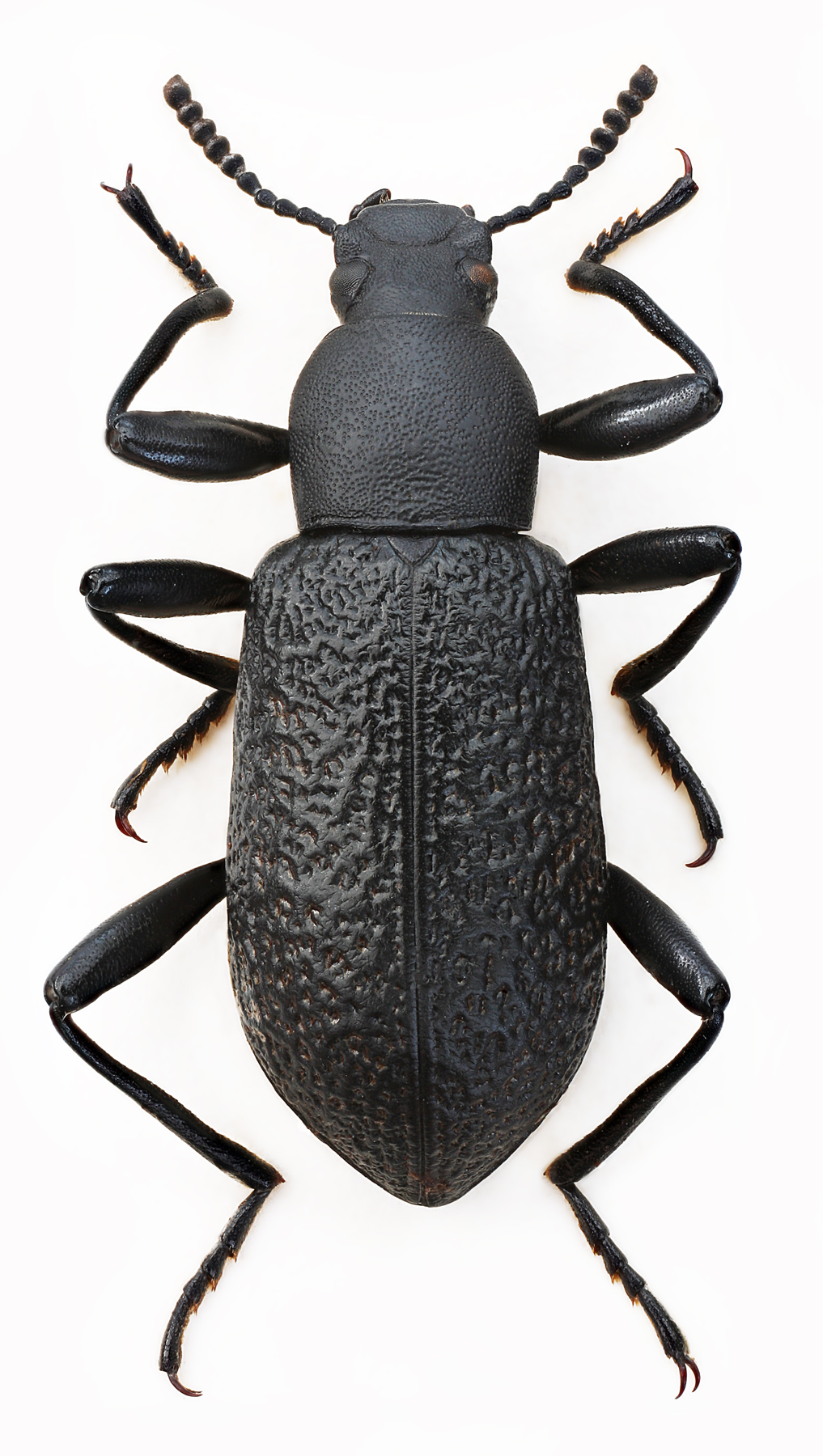

Scientific classification
- Kingdom: Animalia
- Phylum: Arthropoda
- Class: Insecta
- Order: Coleoptera
- Suborder: Polyphaga
- Infraorder: Cucujiformia
- Family: Tenebrionidae
- Genus: Upis
- Species: U. ceramboides

Binomial name
- Upis ceramboides (Linnaeus, 1758)

= Upis ceramboides =

Species of beetle

Upis ceramboides is a species of beetle, one of many wood-living insects that benefit from forest fires. It often occurs in quantities below the bark on the fire-damaged birches, but can sometimes be seen on other deciduous trees such as willow and aspen. The larvae thrive in the inner bark which is rich in mycelia, and in the sapwood. They develop into pupae during the summer months under the bark, and they develop over two or three years. The following spring they reproduce themselves.

It has over the years have disappeared from southern Sweden and is now only locally in the Norrland coast (Västerbotten and Norrbotten) as well as Canada and Alaska. The reason for the species' decline is probably the lack of fire-damaged forests and birch, and the modern forestry practices. Upis ceramboides is considered "vulnerable" in terms of species survival. In Vindeln municipality it is called köksskörven, because it occurs indoors when burning firewood in winter.

The species' survival at temperatures well below freezing are attributed to the xylomannan non-protein antifreeze molecule (polysaccharide and a fatty acid) as well as the sugar-alcohol, threitol.

Other notable freeze-tolerant animals include the fly Polypedilum vanderplanki and the beetle Cucujus clavipes puniceus.
