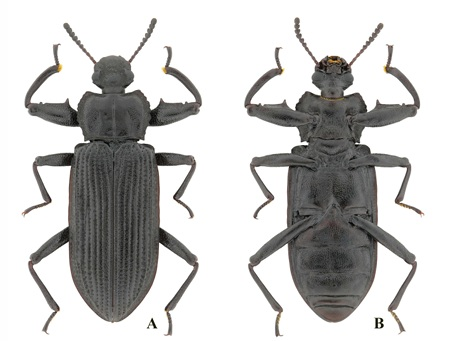

Scientific classification
- Kingdom: Animalia
- Phylum: Arthropoda
- Clade: Pancrustacea
- Class: Insecta
- Order: Coleoptera
- Suborder: Polyphaga
- Infraorder: Cucujiformia
- Family: Tenebrionidae
- Genus: Catapiestus
- Species: C. clavipes

Binomial name
- Catapiestus clavipes Lang & Ren, 2009

= Catapiestus clavipes =

Species of beetle

Catapiestus clavipes is a species of beetle of the Tenebrionidae family. This species is found in China (Hainan, Fujian).

Adults are black and dim shiny and reach a length of 13.8–15.4 mm.
