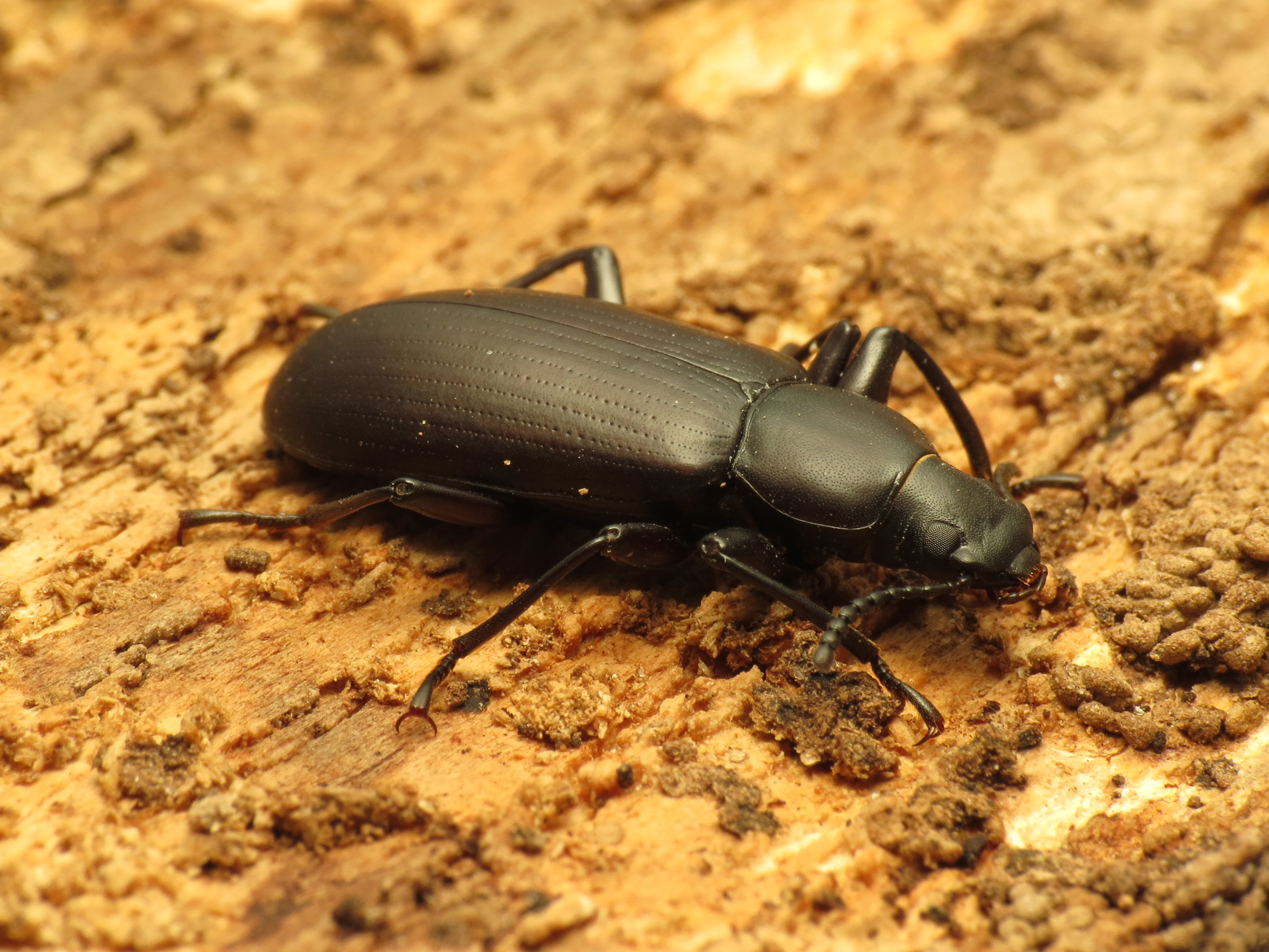

Scientific classification
- Kingdom: Animalia
- Phylum: Arthropoda
- Clade: Pancrustacea
- Class: Insecta
- Order: Coleoptera
- Suborder: Polyphaga
- Infraorder: Cucujiformia
- Family: Tenebrionidae
- Genus: Alobates
- Species: A. pensylvanicus

Binomial name
- Alobates pensylvanicus (De Geer, 1775)

= Alobates pennsylvanica =

Species of beetle

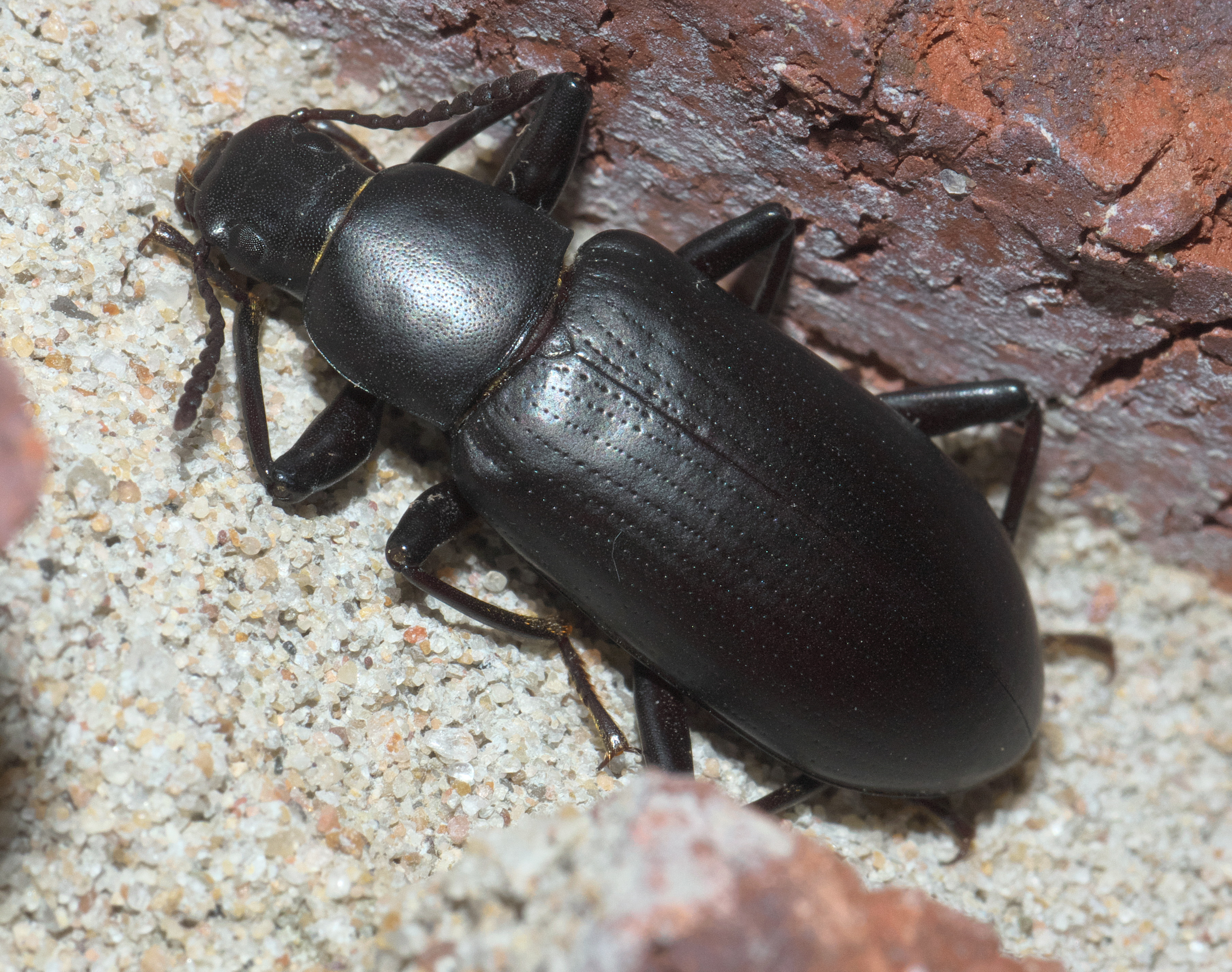
Alobates pennsylvanica, False Mealworm Beetle

Alobates pensylvanicus is a species of beetle in the genus Alobates whose common name is false mealworm beetle. The species is black, has a pronotum that is nearly square, and has at least five rows of fine punctures on each elytron. False mealworm beetles live beneath bark and logs and are found throughout the United States. They have a life span of one year. A. pennsylvanicus is often misidentified with A. barbatus. The difference between the two is on the mentum of the head ventral. A. barbatus have a tuft of long yellow setae, while A. pensylvanicus does not. Some aquariums use the larvae as fish food. Unlike many other tenebrionidae, the larvae are light white and slightly more moisture dependent.

Pensylvanicus is often erroneously spelled as "pennsylvanica", "pensylvanica", or "pennsylvanicus".
