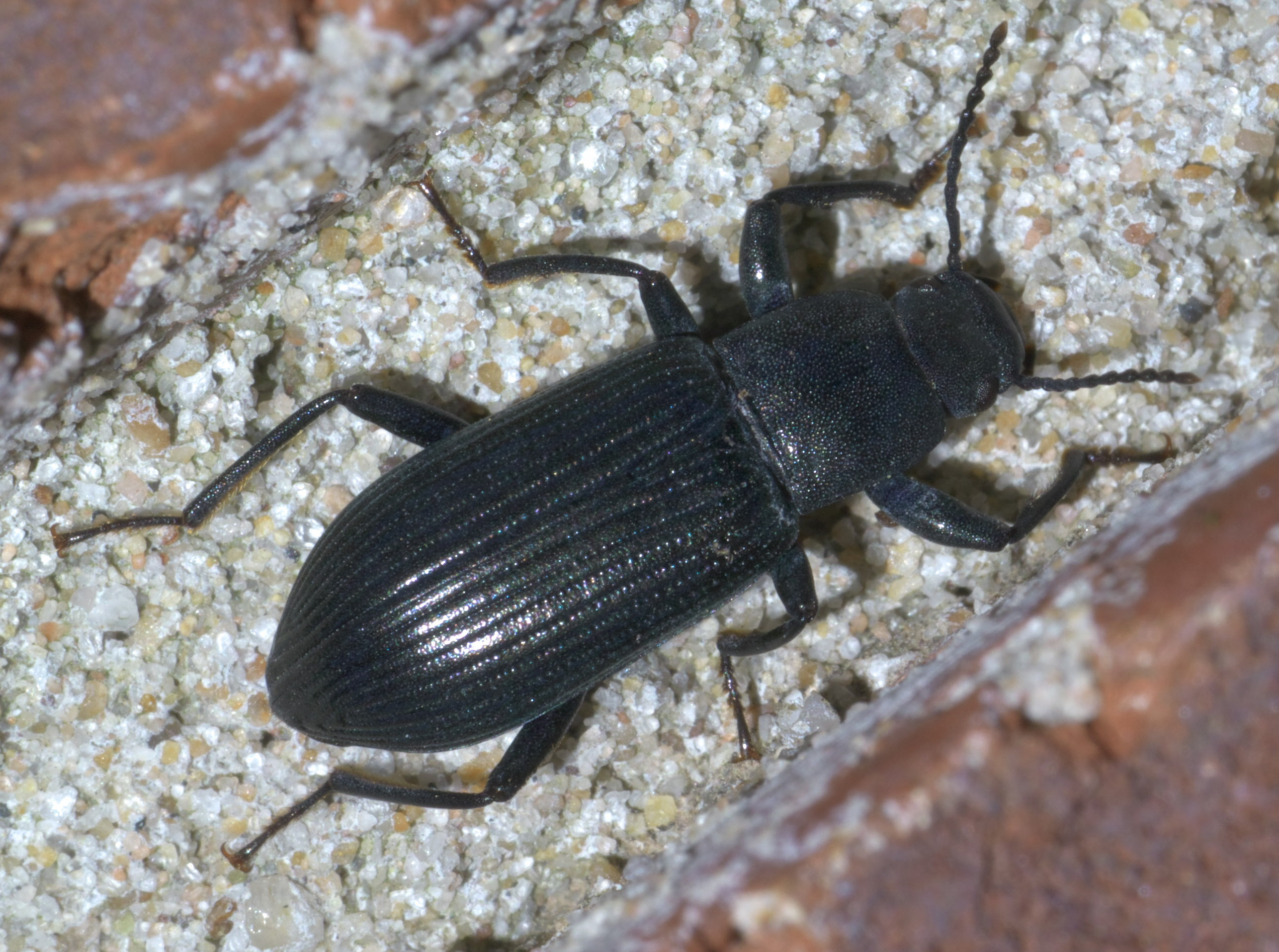

Scientific classification
- Kingdom: Animalia
- Phylum: Arthropoda
- Clade: Pancrustacea
- Class: Insecta
- Order: Coleoptera
- Suborder: Polyphaga
- Infraorder: Cucujiformia
- Family: Tenebrionidae
- Genus: Xylopinus
- Species: X. saperdoides

Binomial name
- Xylopinus saperdoides (Olivier, 1795)

= Xylopinus saperdoides =

Species of beetle

Xylopinus saperdoides is a species of darkling beetle in the family Tenebrionidae.

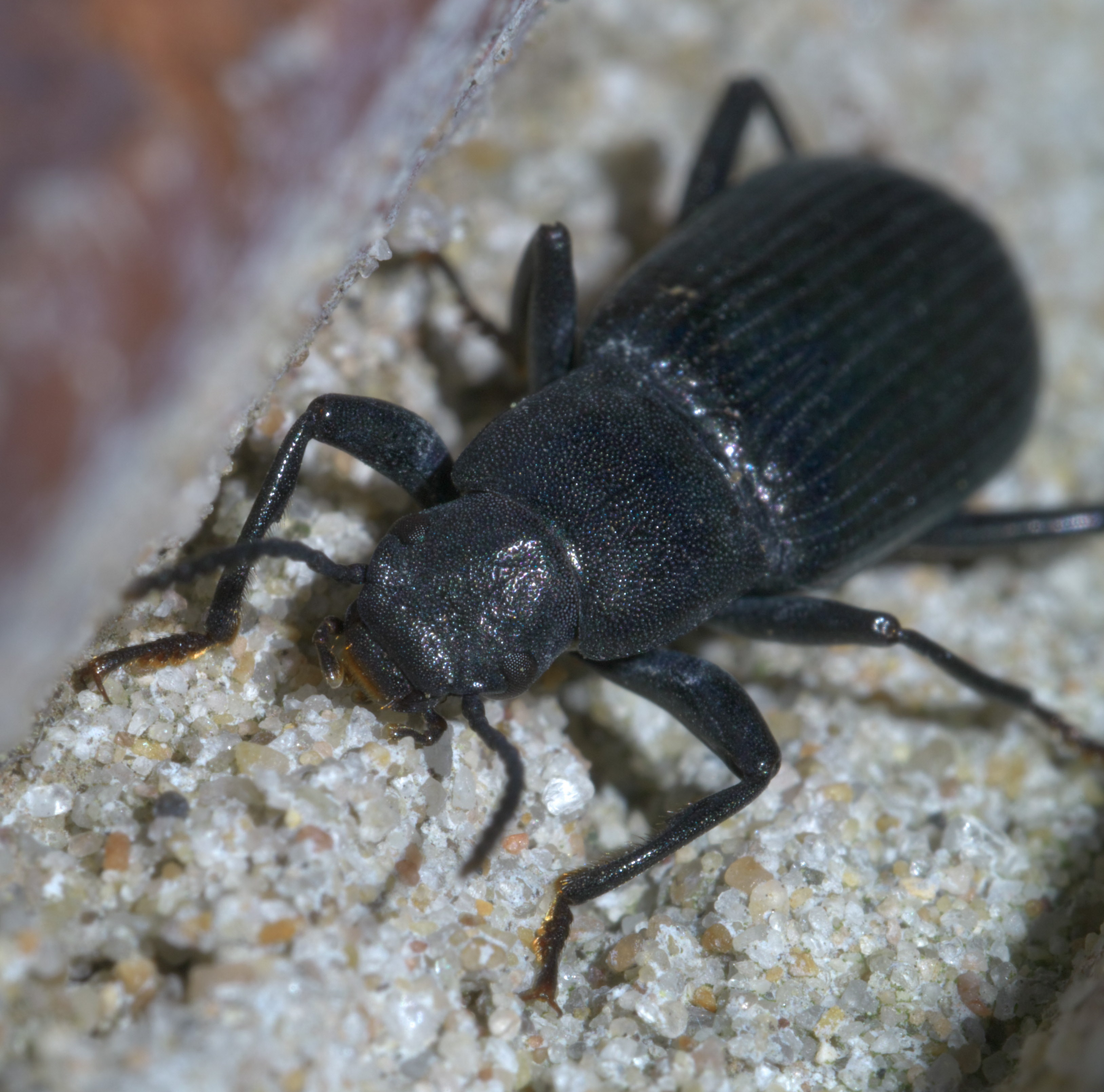
