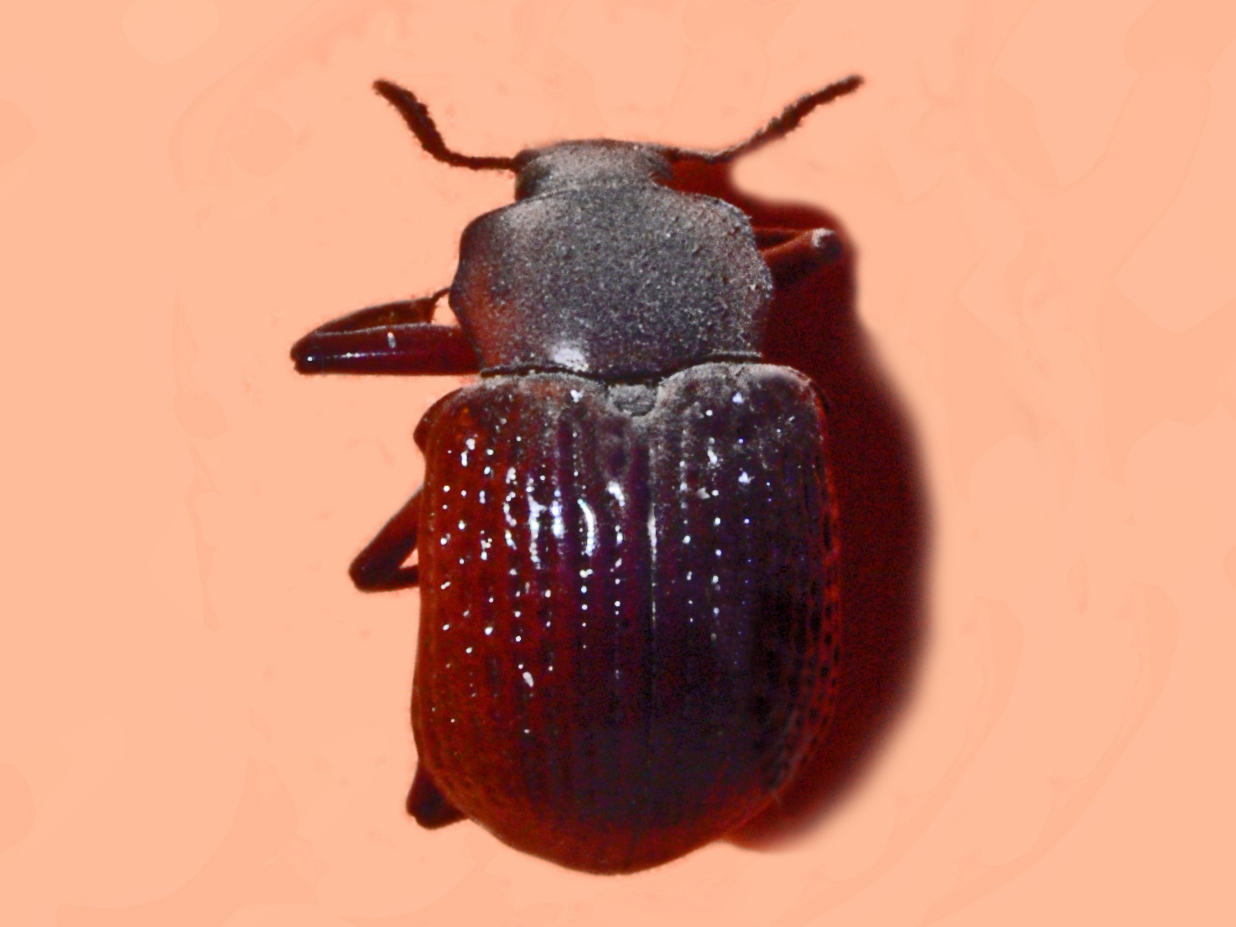
- Cnodalon viride. Museum specimen

Scientific classification
- Kingdom: Animalia
- Phylum: Arthropoda
- Class: Insecta
- Order: Coleoptera
- Suborder: Polyphaga
- Infraorder: Cucujiformia
- Family: Tenebrionidae
- Genus: Cnodalon
- Species: C. viride

Binomial name
- Cnodalon viride Latreille 1804

= Cnodalon viride =

Species of beetle

Cnodalon viride is a species of darkling beetles in the family Tenebrionidae.

== Distribution ==
This species is present in Haiti.
