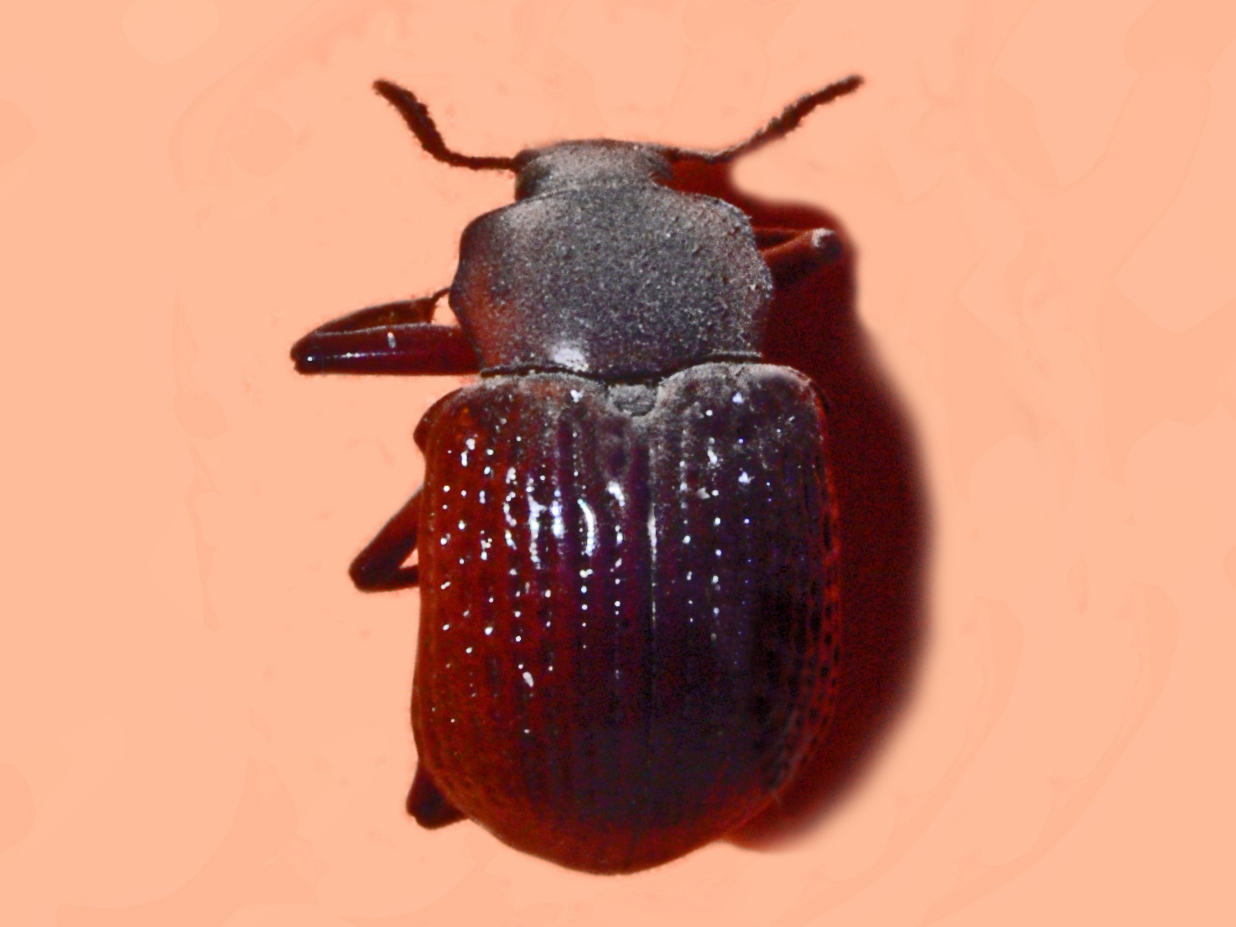
- Cnodalon viride

Scientific classification
- Kingdom: Animalia
- Phylum: Arthropoda
- Class: Insecta
- Order: Coleoptera
- Suborder: Polyphaga
- Infraorder: Cucujiformia
- Family: Tenebrionidae
- Subfamily: Stenochiinae
- Tribe: Cnodalonini
- Genus: Cnodalon; Latreille, 1796

= Cnodalon =

Genus of beetles

Cnodalon is a genus of darkling beetles in the family Tenebrionidae.

== Species ==
Species within this genus include:

- Cnodalon angulicollis
- Cnodalon batesi
- Cnodalon boliviense
- Cnodalon obscurum
- Cnodalon pascoei
- Cnodalon rufipes
- Cnodalon viride
