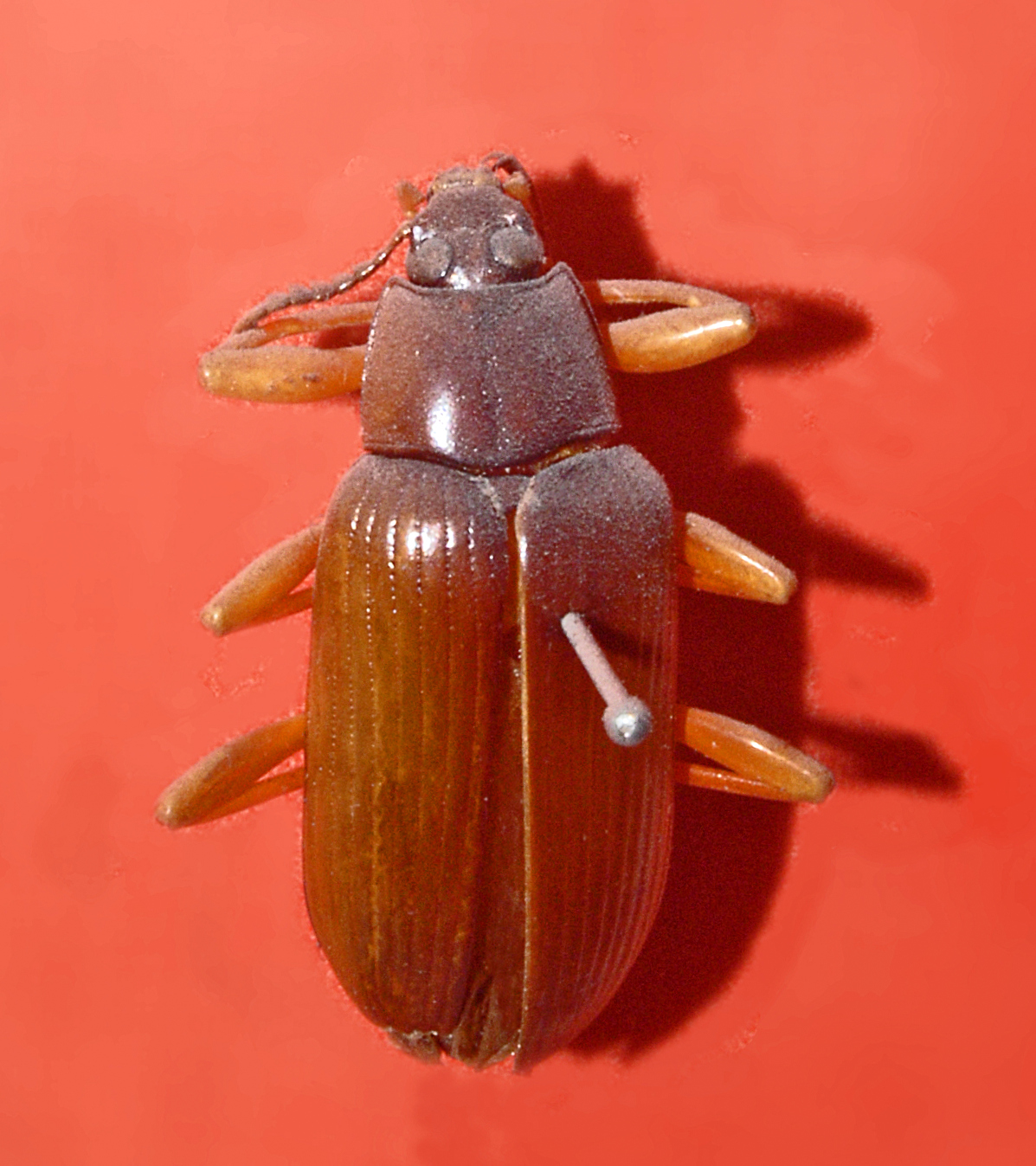
- Scotaeus corallipes

Scientific classification
- Kingdom: Animalia
- Phylum: Arthropoda
- Class: Insecta
- Order: Coleoptera
- Suborder: Polyphaga
- Infraorder: Cucujiformia
- Family: Tenebrionidae
- Subfamily: Stenochiinae
- Genus: Scotaeus; Hope, 1834

= Scotaeus =

Scotaeus corallipes

Genus of beetles

Scotaeus is a genus of darkling beetles (insects in the family Tenebrionidae).

== Species ==
Species within this genus include:

- Scotaeus corallipes Hope, 1834
- Scotaeus dentipennis Gebien, 1935
- Scotaeus focalis Gebien, 1935
- Scotaeus fruhstorferi Gebien, 1935
- Scotaeus seriatopunctatus Heller, 1898
- Scotaeus xestothorax Heller, 1899
