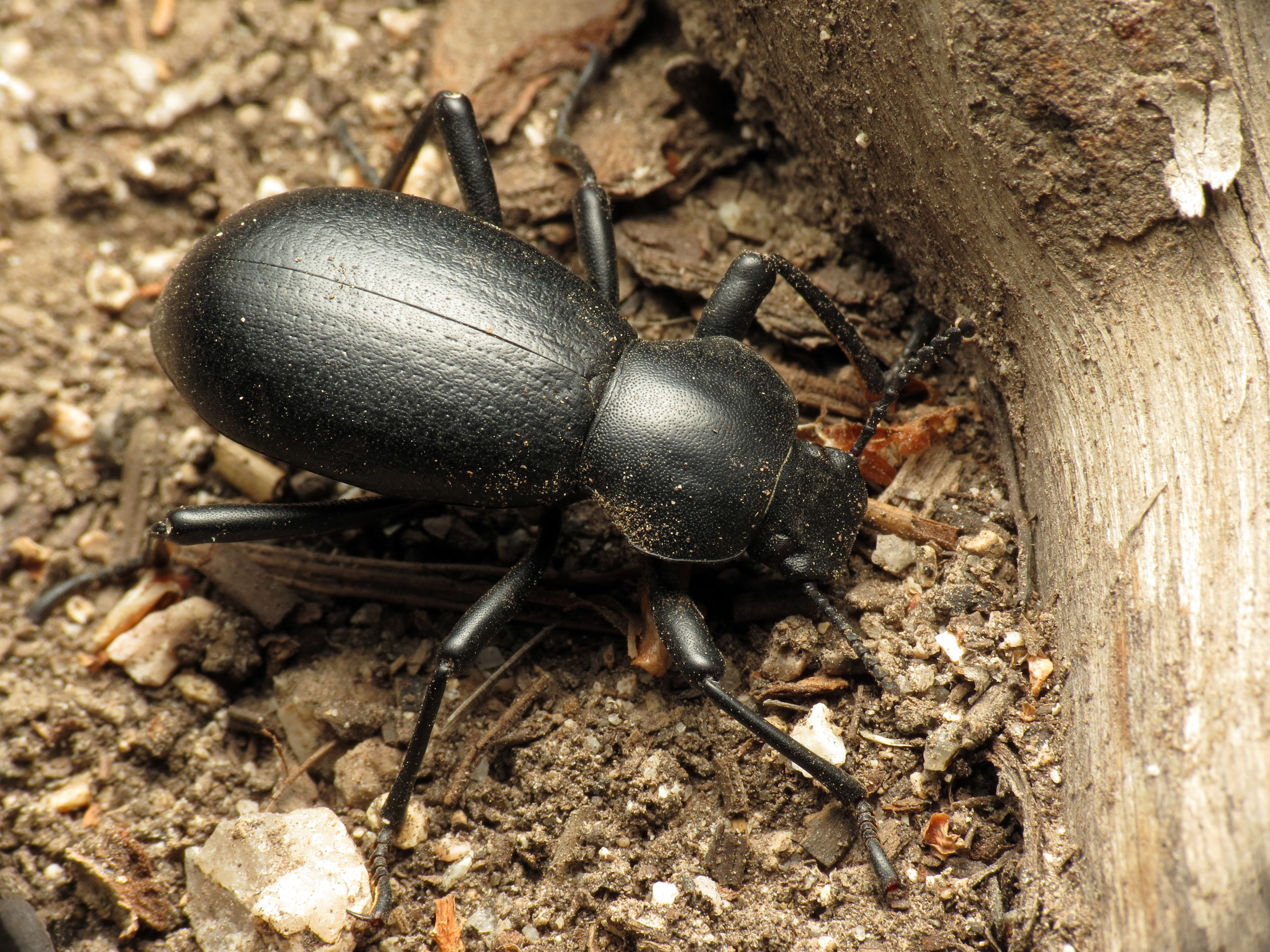

Scientific classification
- Domain: Eukaryota
- Kingdom: Animalia
- Phylum: Arthropoda
- Class: Insecta
- Order: Coleoptera
- Suborder: Polyphaga
- Infraorder: Cucujiformia
- Family: Tenebrionidae
- Subfamily: Stenochiinae
- Tribe: Cnodalonini
- Genus: Coelocnemis; Mannerheim, 1843

= Coelocnemis =

Genus of beetles

Coelocnemis is a genus of darkling beetles in the family Tenebrionidae. There are about seven described species in Coelocnemis, found mainly in western Canada, western United States, and Mexico.

== Species ==
These species belong to the genus Coelocnemis:

Coelocnemis dilaticollis Mannerheim, 1843 (California broad-necked darkling beetle)
Coelocnemis lucia Doyen, 1973
Coelocnemis magna LeConte, 1851
Coelocnemis punctata LeConte, 1855
Coelocnemis rugulosa Doyen, 1973
Coelocnemis slevini Blaisdell, 1925
Coelocnemis sulcata Casey, 1895
