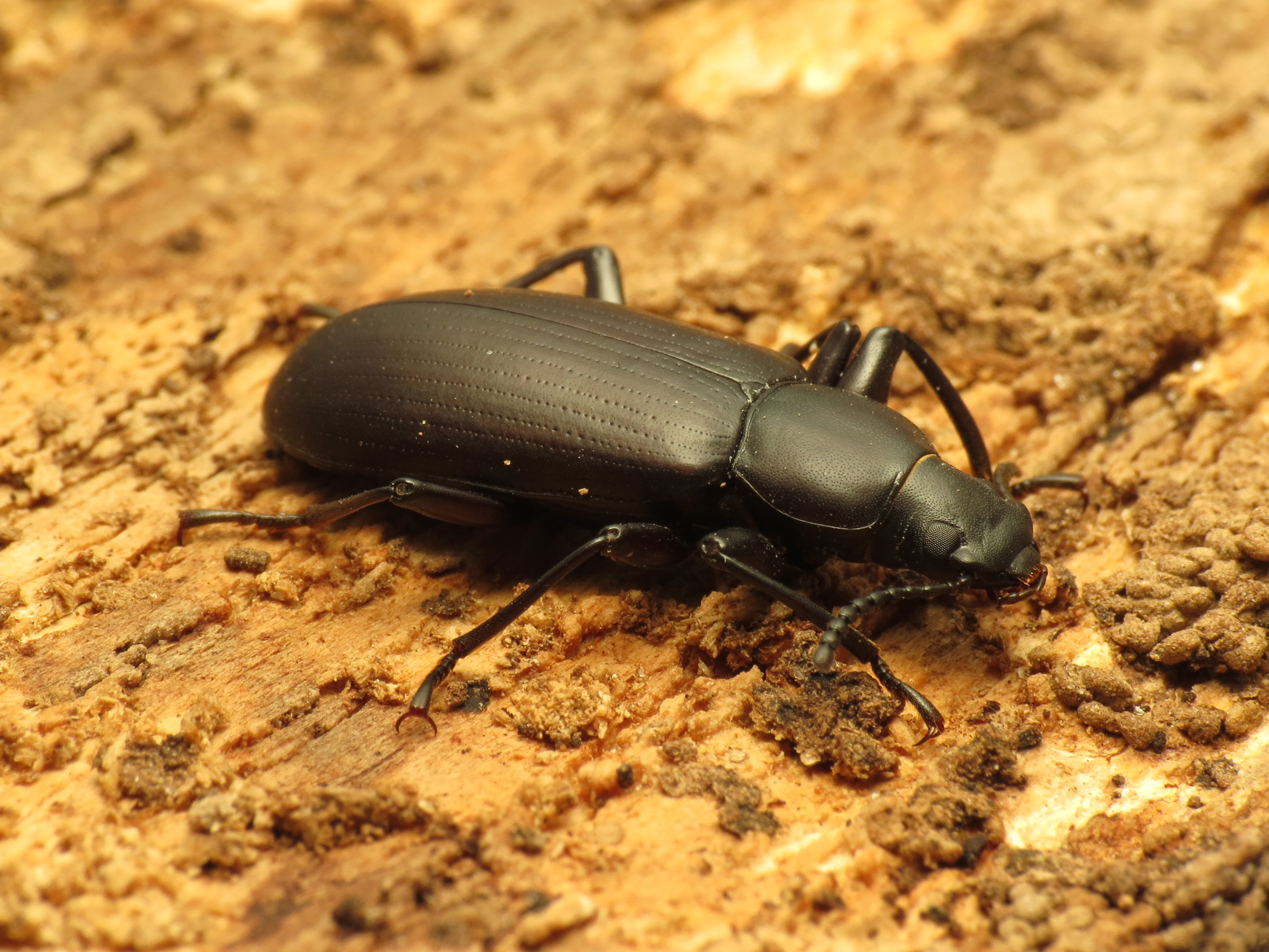
- Alobates pensylvanica

Scientific classification
- Domain: Eukaryota
- Kingdom: Animalia
- Phylum: Arthropoda
- Class: Insecta
- Order: Coleoptera
- Suborder: Polyphaga
- Infraorder: Cucujiformia
- Family: Tenebrionidae
- Tribe: Cnodalonini
- Genus: Alobates; Motschoulsky, 1872

= Alobates =

Genus of beetles

Alobates (Motschulsky 1872) is a genus of darkling beetles in the family Tenebrionidae. The name likely comes from Greek 'alo' (variant of allo) meaning 'other', and 'bates' meaning 'one who treads/haunts'. There are at least two described species in Alobates. These species are often misidentified, but can be differentiated by a view of the mentum of the head ventral. A. barbatus have a tuft of long yellow setae, while A. pensylvanicus does not.

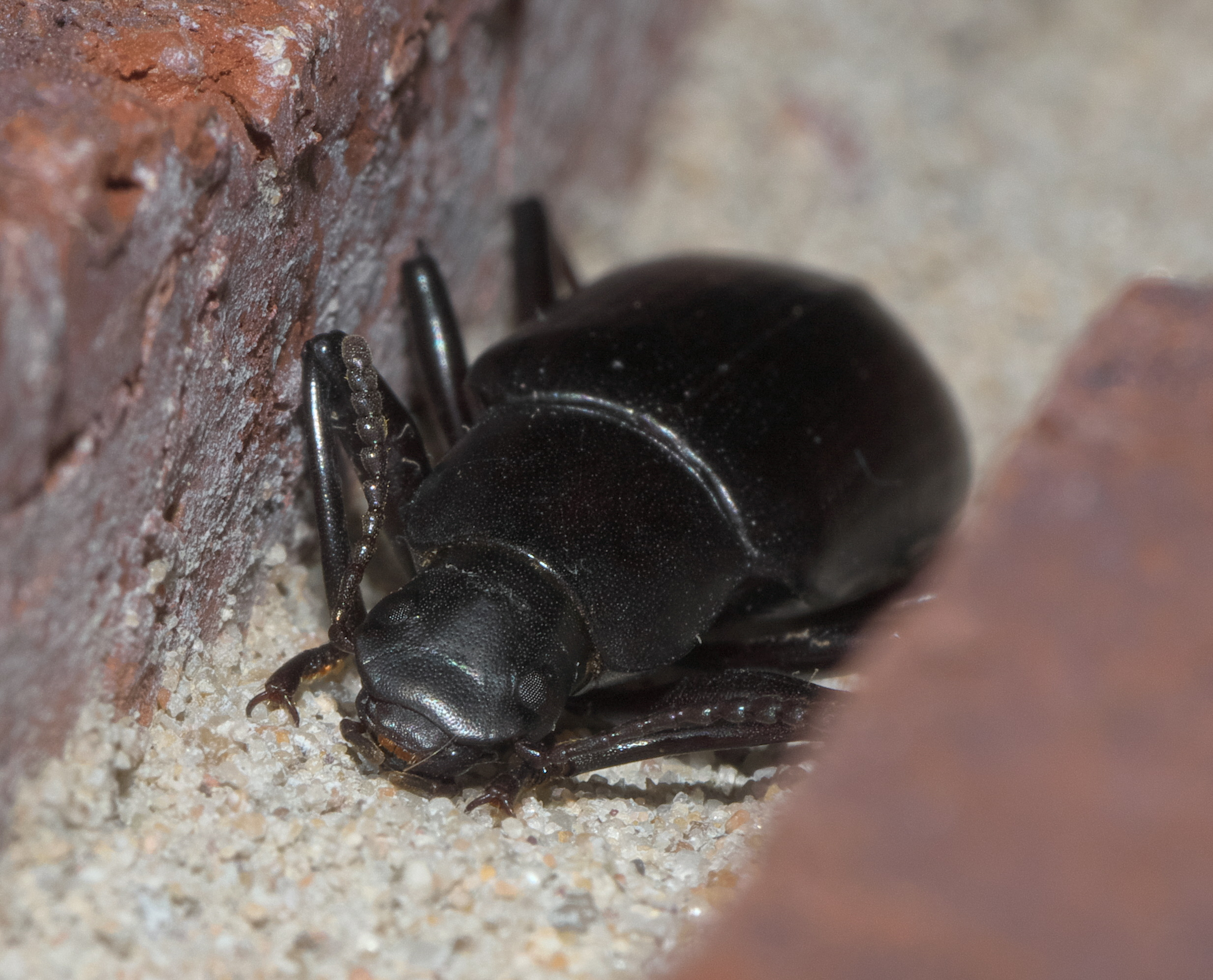
Alobates pensylvanica

== Species ==
These two species belong to the genus Alobates:

- Alobates barbatus (Knoch, 1801)^{b}
- Alobates pennsylvanica (DeGeer, 1775) ^{g b}

Data sources: i = ITIS, c = Catalogue of Life, g = GBIF, b = Bugguide.net

The species Alobates pensylvanicus is sometimes erroneously spelled "pennsylvanica" or "pensylvanica".
