= Threitol =

- D-threitol

Names
- IUPAC name D-Threitol
- Systematic IUPAC name (2R,3R)-Butane-1,2,3,4-tetrol

Identifiers
CAS Number	2418-52-2
3D model (JSmol)	Interactive image
Beilstein Reference	1719752
ChEBI	CHEBI:48300
ChemSpider	147828
DrugBank	DB03278
ECHA InfoCard	100.150.149
EC Number	621-282-7
Gmelin Reference	1782960
KEGG	C16884
PubChem CID	169019
UNII	6DN82XBT5M
CompTox Dashboard (EPA)	DTXSID801336604
- InChI: InChI=1S/C4H10O4/c5-1-3(7)4(8)2-6/h3-8H,1-2H2/t3-,4-/m1/s1 Key: UNXHWFMMPAWVPI-QWWZWVQMSA-N; InChI=1/C4H10O4/c5-1-3(7)4(8)2-6/h3-8H,1-2H2/t3-,4-/m1/s1 Key: UNXHWFMMPAWVPI-QWWZWVQMBP
- SMILES: OC[C@@H](O)[C@H](O)CO

Properties
Chemical formula	C_{4}H_{10}O_{4}
Molar mass	122.12
Appearance	Solid
Melting point	88 to 90 °C (190 to 194 °F; 361 to 363 K)

Hazards
- GHS labelling
Pictograms	(GHS07: Exclamation mark)
Signal word	Warning
Hazard statements	H315, H319, H335
Precautionary statements	P261, P264, P271, P280, P302+P352, P304+P340, P305+P351+P338, P312, P332+P313, P337+P313, P362, P403+P233, P405, P501
- Except where otherwise noted, data are given for materials in their standard state (at 25 °C [77 °F], 100 kPa). Infobox references

Threitol is the chiral four-carbon sugar alcohol with the molecular formula C_{4}H_{10}O_{4}. It is primarily used as an intermediate in the chemical synthesis of other compounds. It exists in the enantiomorphic forms D-threitol and L-threitol, the reduced forms of D- and L-threose. It is the diastereomer of erythritol, which is used as a sugar substitute.

In living organisms, threitol is found in the edible fungus Armillaria mellea. It serves as a cryoprotectant (antifreeze agent) in the Alaskan beetle Upis ceramboides.

== See also ==
- Antifreeze protein
- Dithiothreitol, a thiol derivative of threitol
