= Merinus (beetle) =

Scientific classification
- Domain: Eukaryota
- Kingdom: Animalia
- Phylum: Arthropoda
- Class: Insecta
- Order: Coleoptera
- Suborder: Polyphaga
- Infraorder: Cucujiformia
- Family: Tenebrionidae
- Tribe: Cnodalonini
- Genus: Merinus; Leconte, 1862

Genus of beetles

Merinus is a genus of darkling beetles in the family Tenebrionidae. There is at least one described species in Merinus, M. laevis.
