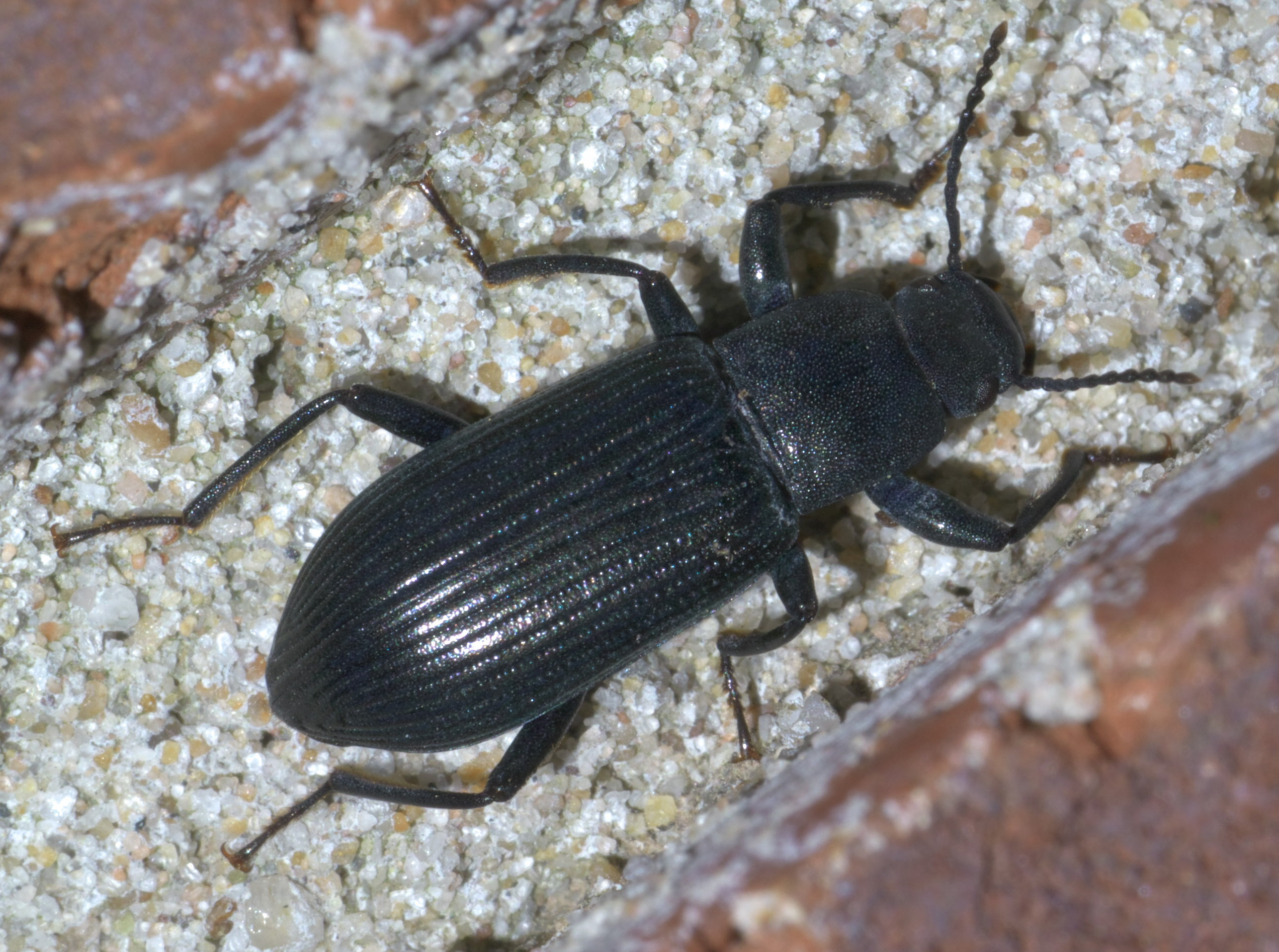
- Xylopinus saperdoides

Scientific classification
- Domain: Eukaryota
- Kingdom: Animalia
- Phylum: Arthropoda
- Class: Insecta
- Order: Coleoptera
- Suborder: Polyphaga
- Infraorder: Cucujiformia
- Family: Tenebrionidae
- Tribe: Cnodalonini
- Genus: Xylopinus; Leconte, 1862

= Xylopinus =

Genus of beetles

Xylopinus is a genus of darkling beetles in the family Tenebrionidae. There are at least three described species in Xylopinus.

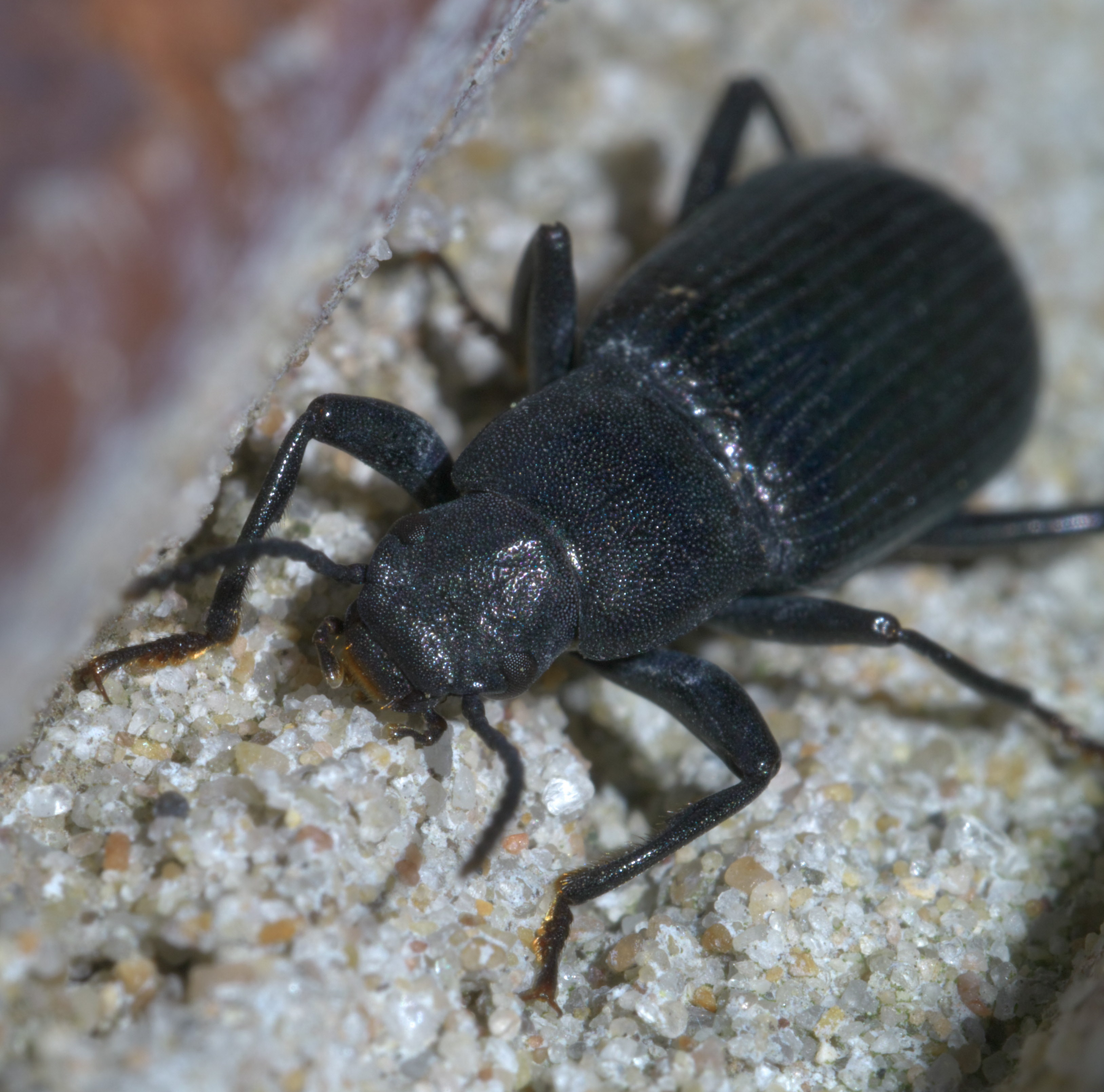
Xylopinus saperdoides

== Species ==
These three species belong to the genus Xylopinus:

- Xylopinus aenescens LeConte^{g b}
- Xylopinus saperdoides (Olivier)^{g b}
- Xylopinus saperioides Olivier, 1795^{g}

Data sources: i = ITIS, c = Catalogue of Life, g = GBIF, b = Bugguide.net
