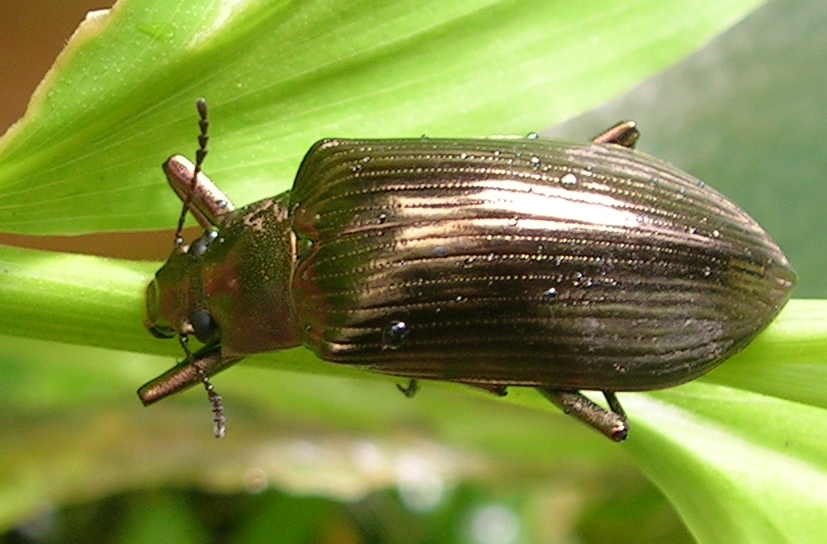
- A species from southern India

Scientific classification
- Kingdom: Animalia
- Phylum: Arthropoda
- Class: Insecta
- Order: Lepidoptera
- Superfamily: Noctuoidea
- Family: Noctuidae
- Genus: Falsocamaria; Pic, 1917

Type species
- Falsocamaria obscura

Synonyms
- Eucamaria Gebien, 1917

= Falsocamaria =

Genus of beetles

Falsocamaria is a genus of beetles in the family Tenebrionidae. About 11 species of beetle are known in the genus, all of which are found in the Oriental region.

These beetles are 2.5 to 3.5 cm long and are usually metallic and shiny in appearance with elongated sub-parallel-sided elytra. The tip of the clypeus is extend forward on the sides. The antennae are not long enough to reach the humerus and have the four terminal segments flattened. The elytra are often grooved with puncturing and the humeral region appear swollen.

Some of the species in this genus were earlier placed under Campsiomorpha. Species in the genus include:

- F. obscura Pic, 1917
- F. obscurovientia Wang, Ren & Liu, 2012
- F. rufisutura Wang, Ren & Liu, 2012
- F. fruhstorferi (Fairmaire, 1903)
- F. imperialis (Fairmaire, 1903)
- F. distinctestriata (Pic, 1917)
- F. muelleri (Kaszab, 1954)
- F. spectabilis (Pascoe, 1860)
- F. microdera (Fairmaire, 1899)
- F. nishimurai Masumoto, 1990
