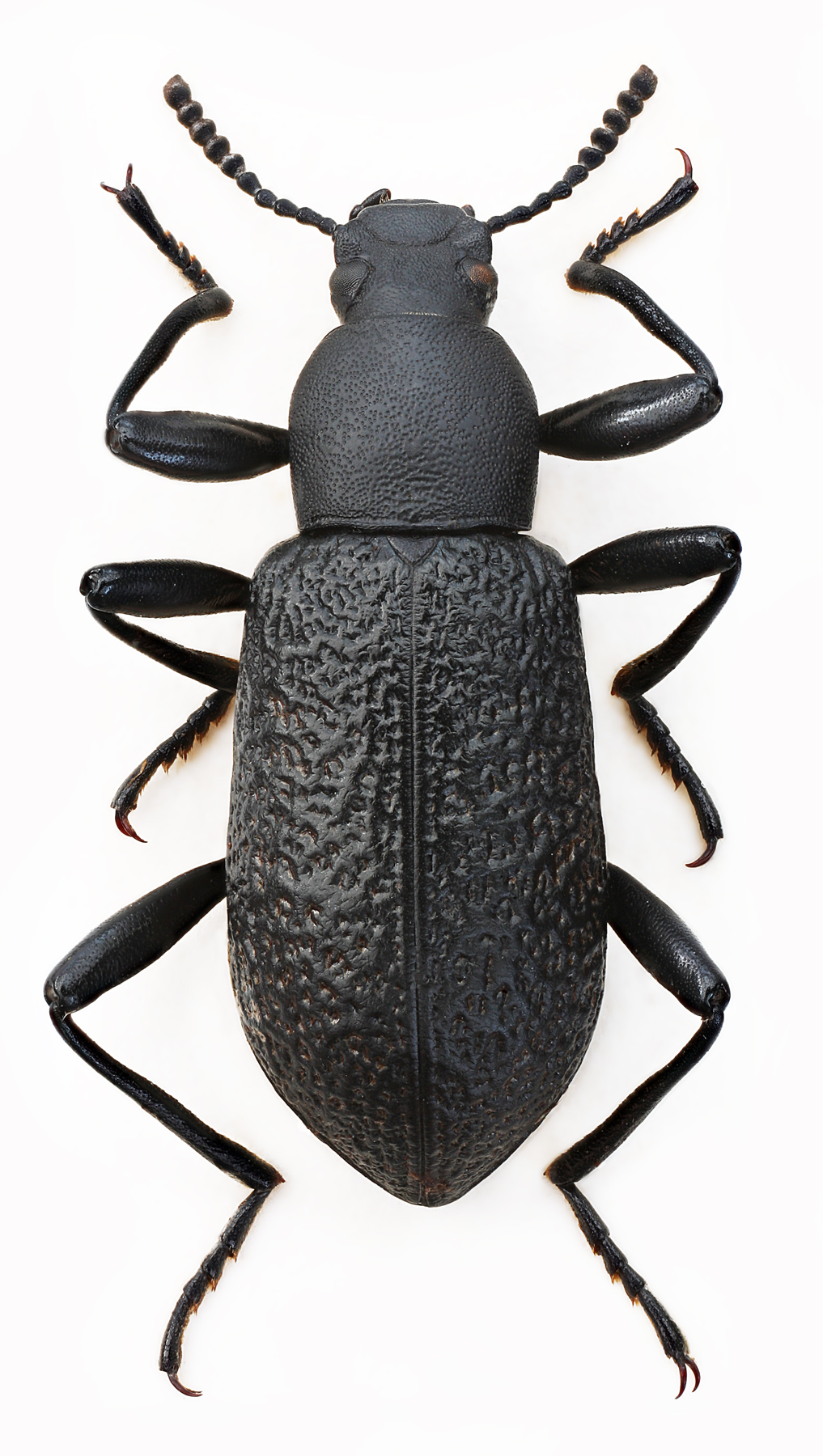
- Upis ceramboides

Scientific classification
- Domain: Eukaryota
- Kingdom: Animalia
- Phylum: Arthropoda
- Class: Insecta
- Order: Coleoptera
- Suborder: Polyphaga
- Infraorder: Cucujiformia
- Family: Tenebrionidae
- Tribe: Cnodalonini
- Genus: Upis; Fabricius, 1792

= Upis =

Genus of beetles

Upis is a genus of beetles, belonging to the family Tenebrionidae.

The genus was described in 1792 by Johan Christian Fabricius.

The genus has cosmopolitan distribution.

Species:

- Upis ceramboides (Linnaeus, 1758)
