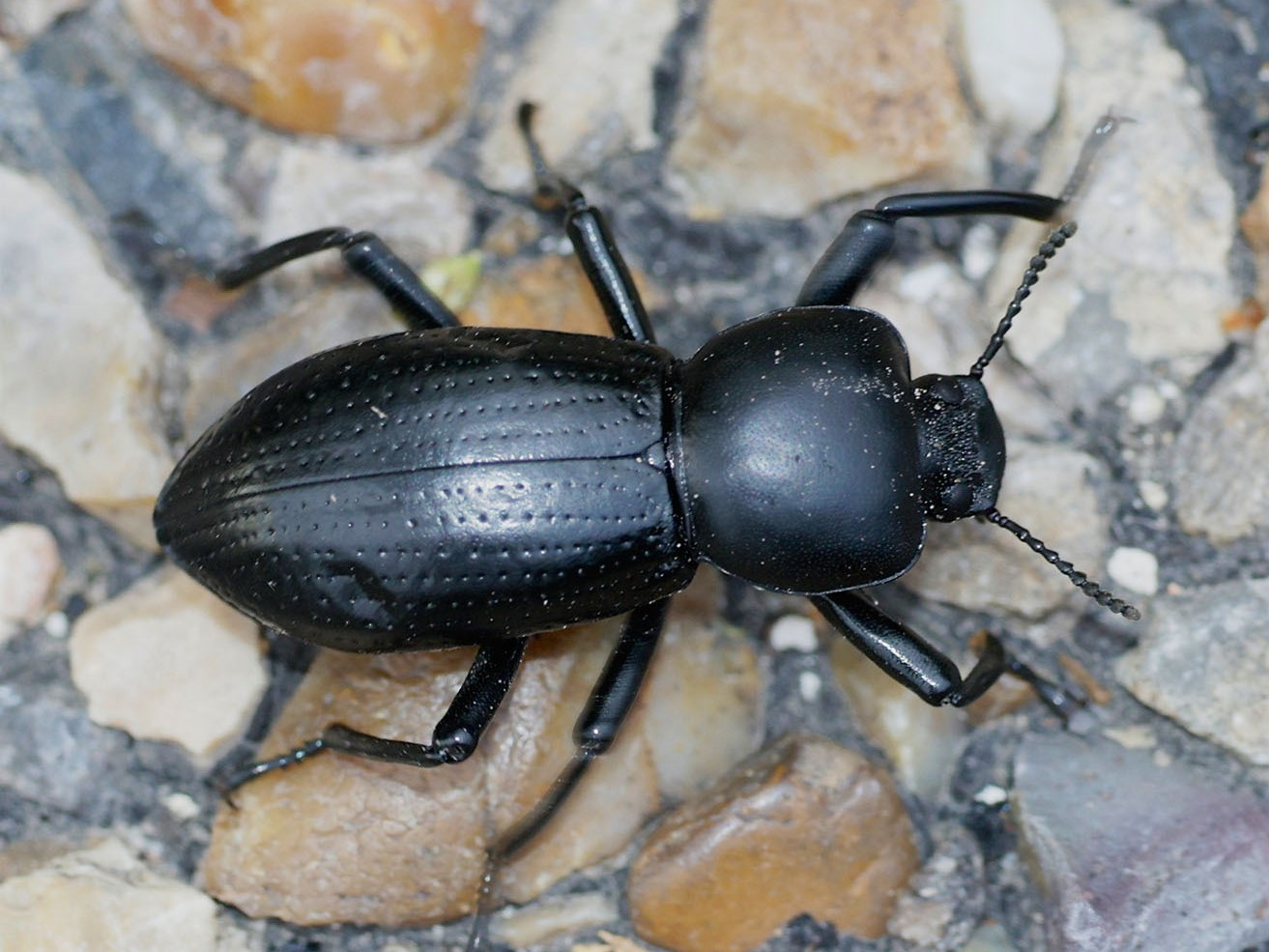
- Oenopion zopheroides

Scientific classification
- Domain: Eukaryota
- Kingdom: Animalia
- Phylum: Arthropoda
- Class: Insecta
- Order: Coleoptera
- Suborder: Polyphaga
- Infraorder: Cucujiformia
- Family: Tenebrionidae
- Tribe: Cnodalonini
- Genus: Oenopion; Champion, 1885

= Oenopion (beetle) =

Genus of beetles

Oenopion is a genus of darkling beetles in the family Tenebrionidae. There are at least three described species in the genus Oenopion.

== Species ==
These three species belong to the genus Oenopion:

- Oenopion adeptus Doyen, 1971
- Oenopion gibbosus Champion, 1885
- Oenopion zopheroides (Horn 1874)
