= Menephilus =

Scientific classification
- Kingdom: Animalia
- Phylum: Arthropoda
- Class: Insecta
- Order: Coleoptera
- Suborder: Polyphaga
- Infraorder: Cucujiformia
- Family: Tenebrionidae
- Genus: Menephilus; Mulsant, 1854

Genus of beetles

Menephilus is a genus of beetles belonging to the family Tenebrionidae.

The species of this genus are found in Europe, Africa and Japan.

Species:

- Menephilus cylindricus (Herbst, 1784)
- Menephilus formosanus Masumoto, 1981
