= Catapiestus =

Scientific classification
- Kingdom: Animalia
- Phylum: Arthropoda
- Clade: Pancrustacea
- Class: Insecta
- Order: Coleoptera
- Suborder: Polyphaga
- Infraorder: Cucujiformia
- Family: Tenebrionidae
- Tribe: Cnodalonini
- Genus: Catapiestus; Perty, 1831

Genus of beetles

Catapiestus is a genus of darkling beetles in the family Tenebrionidae.

== Selected species ==
- Catapiestus bispinosus Yang & Guo, 2018
- Catapiestus clavipes Lang & Ren, 2009
