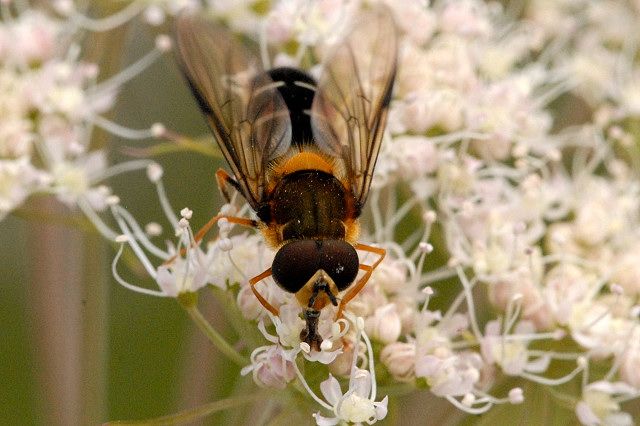
- Male
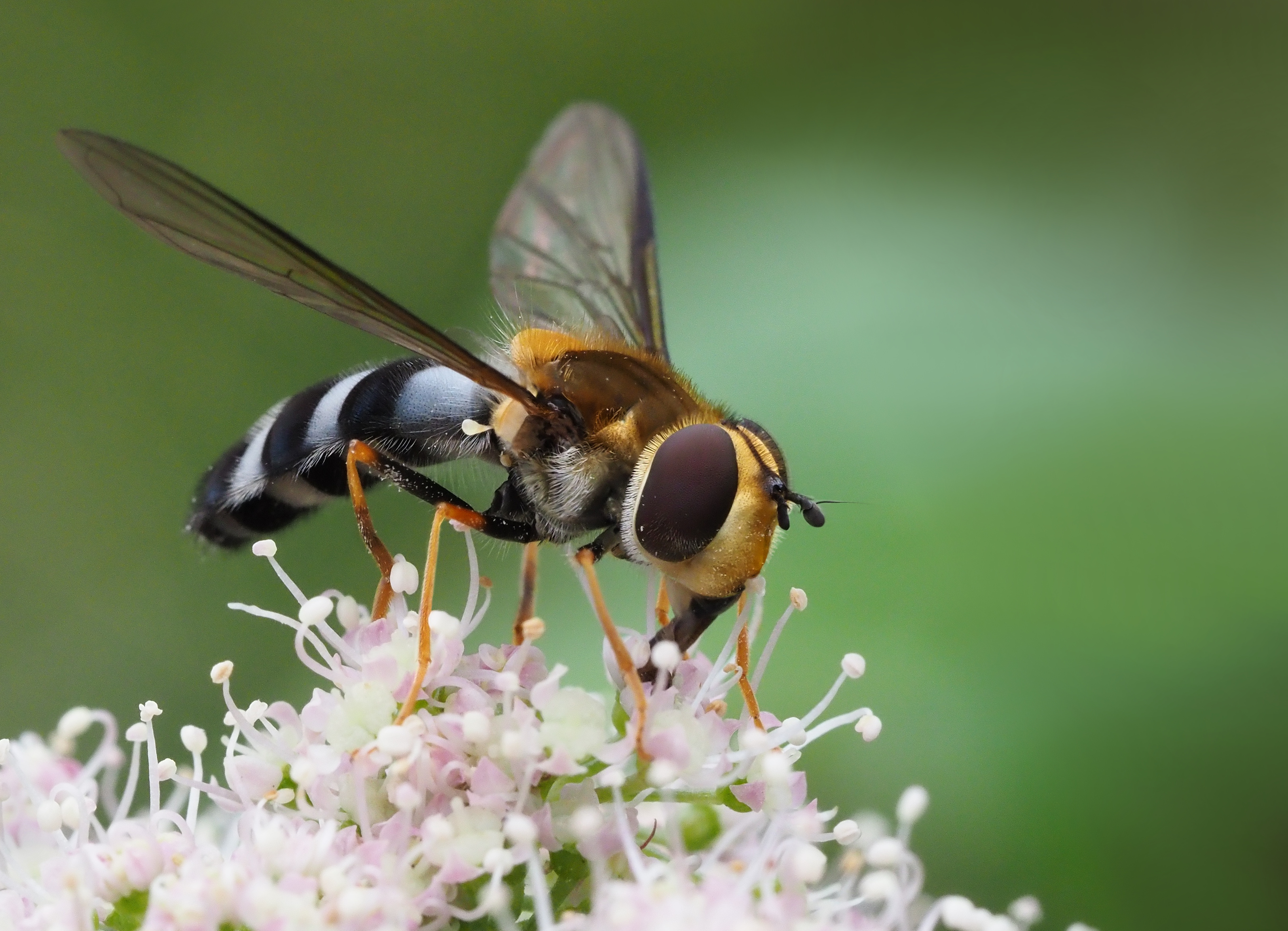
- Female

Scientific classification
- Kingdom: Animalia
- Phylum: Arthropoda
- Class: Insecta
- Order: Diptera
- Family: Syrphidae
- Genus: Leucozona
- Subgenus: Ischyrosyrphus
- Species: L. glaucia

Binomial name
- Leucozona glaucia (Linnaeus, 1758)

Synonyms
- Musca glaucia Linnaeus, 1758

= Leucozona glaucia =

Species of fly

Leucozona glaucia, the Pale-saddled Leucozona is a Palearctic hoverfly. Larvae feed on ground layer aphids. Adults are usually seen visiting flowers.

== Description ==
External images For terms see Morphology of Diptera
Wing length 8-11·25 mm. Scutellum yellow. Tergite 2 has large silverish-white to yellowish- white marks (often merged). Tergites 3 and 4 have narrow or absent markings. The male genitalia are figured by Dusek and Laska (1967) . The larva is figured by (Dusek and Laska (1962) See references for determination

== Distribution ==
The species has a Palearctic distribution from Fennoscandia south to the Pyrenees, from Ireland east through central Europe into Turkey and European Russia, Russian Far East and Siberia and the Pacific coast (Kuril Islands and Japan).

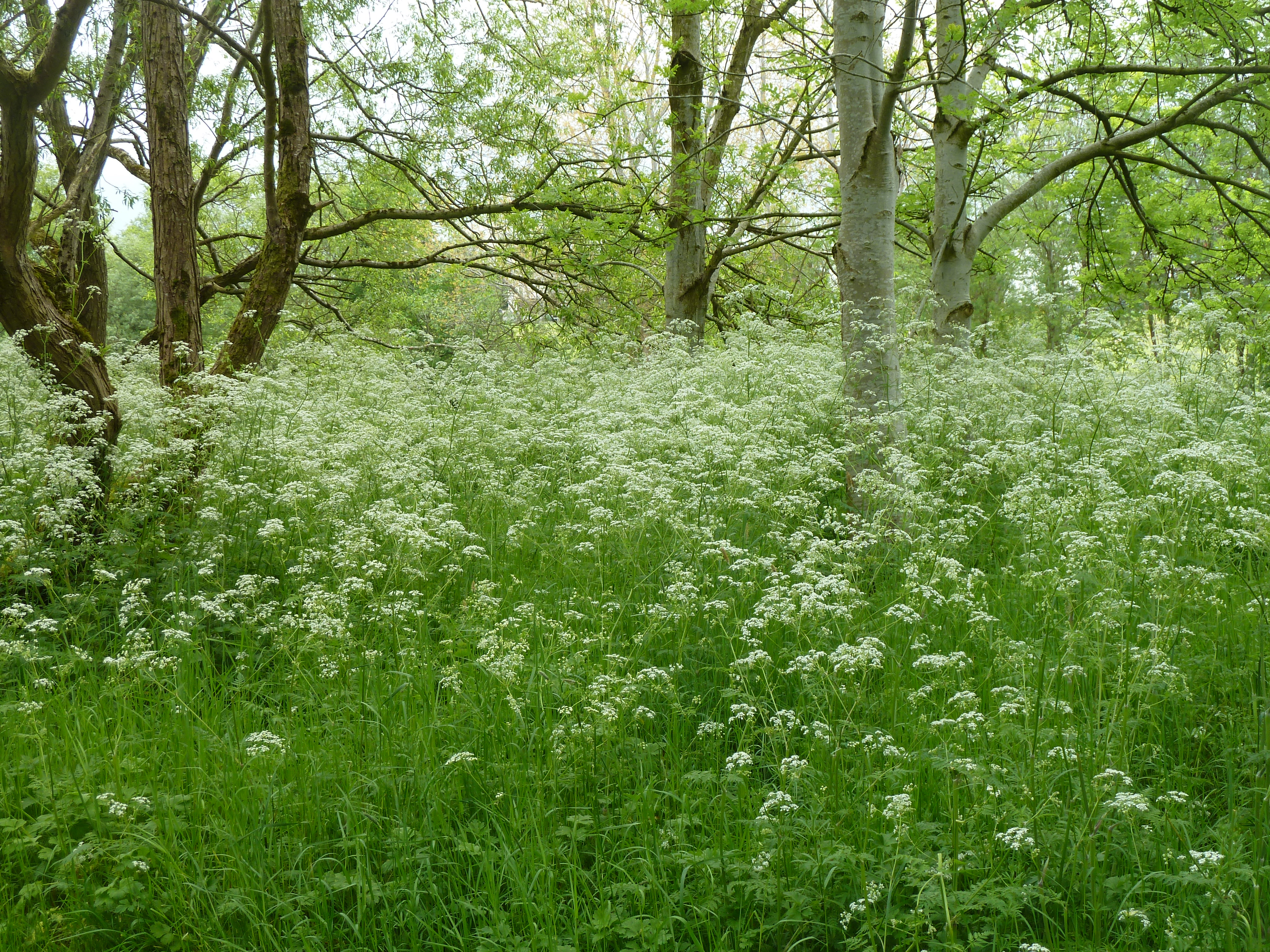
Anthriscus habitat. Ireland

== Biology ==
The species' habitat includes Quercus and Fagus forest, riverine gallery forest of Fraxinus and Salix, beside streams, in clearings and along tracks. Flowers visited include white umbellifers, Filipendula, Sambucus and Senecio. The flight period is May to September, with the peak in July and August. The larvae feed on aphids.
