= Nebria psammophila =

Scientific classification
- Domain: Eukaryota
- Kingdom: Animalia
- Phylum: Arthropoda
- Class: Insecta
- Order: Coleoptera
- Suborder: Adephaga
- Family: Carabidae
- Genus: Nebria
- Species: N. psammophila

Binomial name
- Nebria psammophila Solsky, 1874

Species of beetle

Nebria psammophila is a species of ground beetle from the Nebriinae subfamily that can be found in Kashmir, Kazakhstan, Kyrgyzstan, Nepal, Tajikistan, and Uzbekistan.
