= Maladera arenicola =

Scientific classification
- Kingdom: Animalia
- Phylum: Arthropoda
- Class: Insecta
- Order: Coleoptera
- Suborder: Polyphaga
- Infraorder: Scarabaeiformia
- Family: Scarabaeidae
- Genus: Maladera
- Species: M. arenicola

Binomial name
- Maladera arenicola (Solsky, 1876)

Synonyms
- Serica arenicola Solsky, 1876; Leucoserica diluta Reitter, 1896

Species of beetle

Maladera arenicola is a species of beetle of the family Scarabaeidae. It is found in Kazakhstan, Turkmenistan and Uzbekistan.

== Description ==
Adults reach a length of about 7 mm. They have a pale testaceous, oblong-ovate, convex, shiny body. They are glabrous above, but with whitish hairs beneath.
