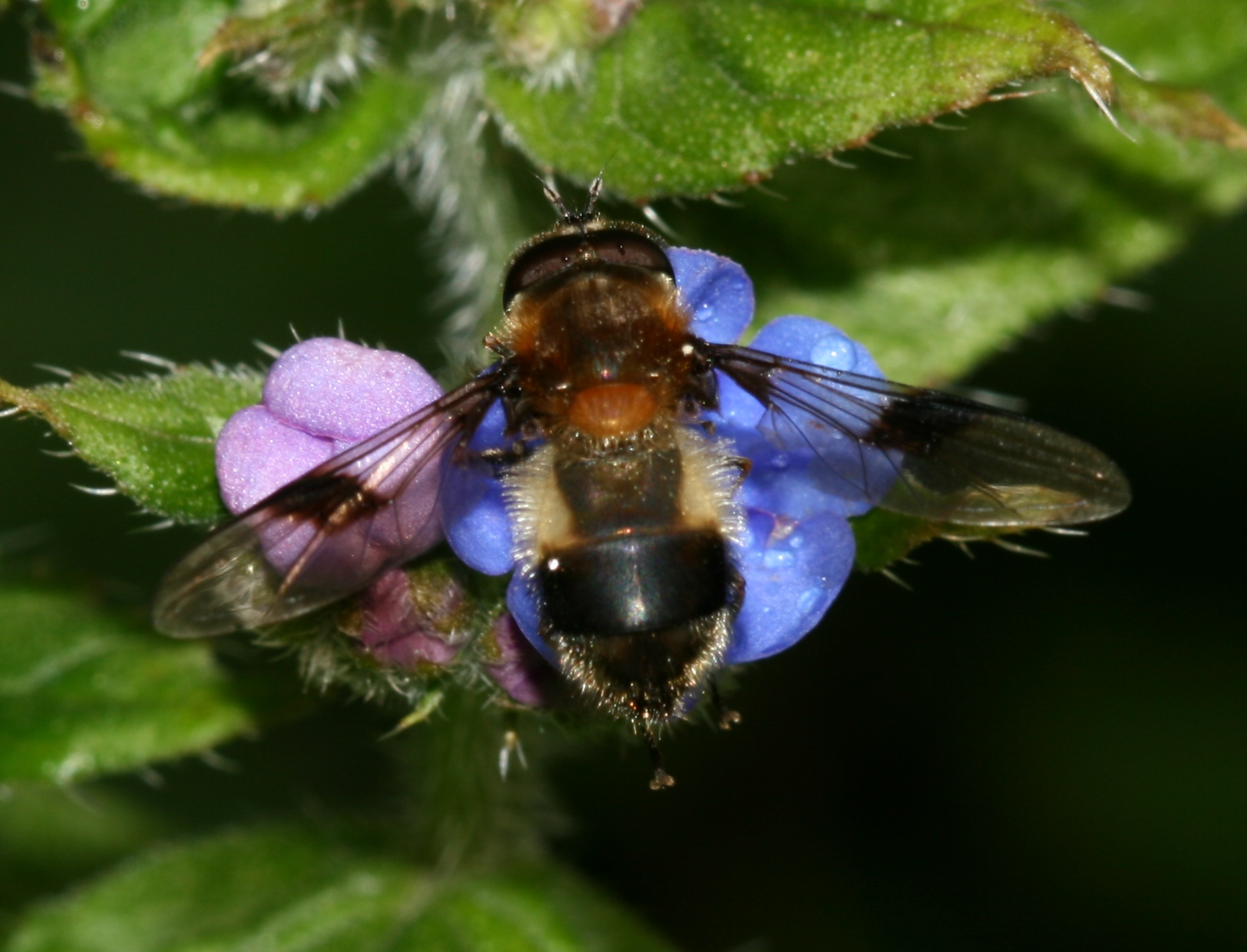
- Male
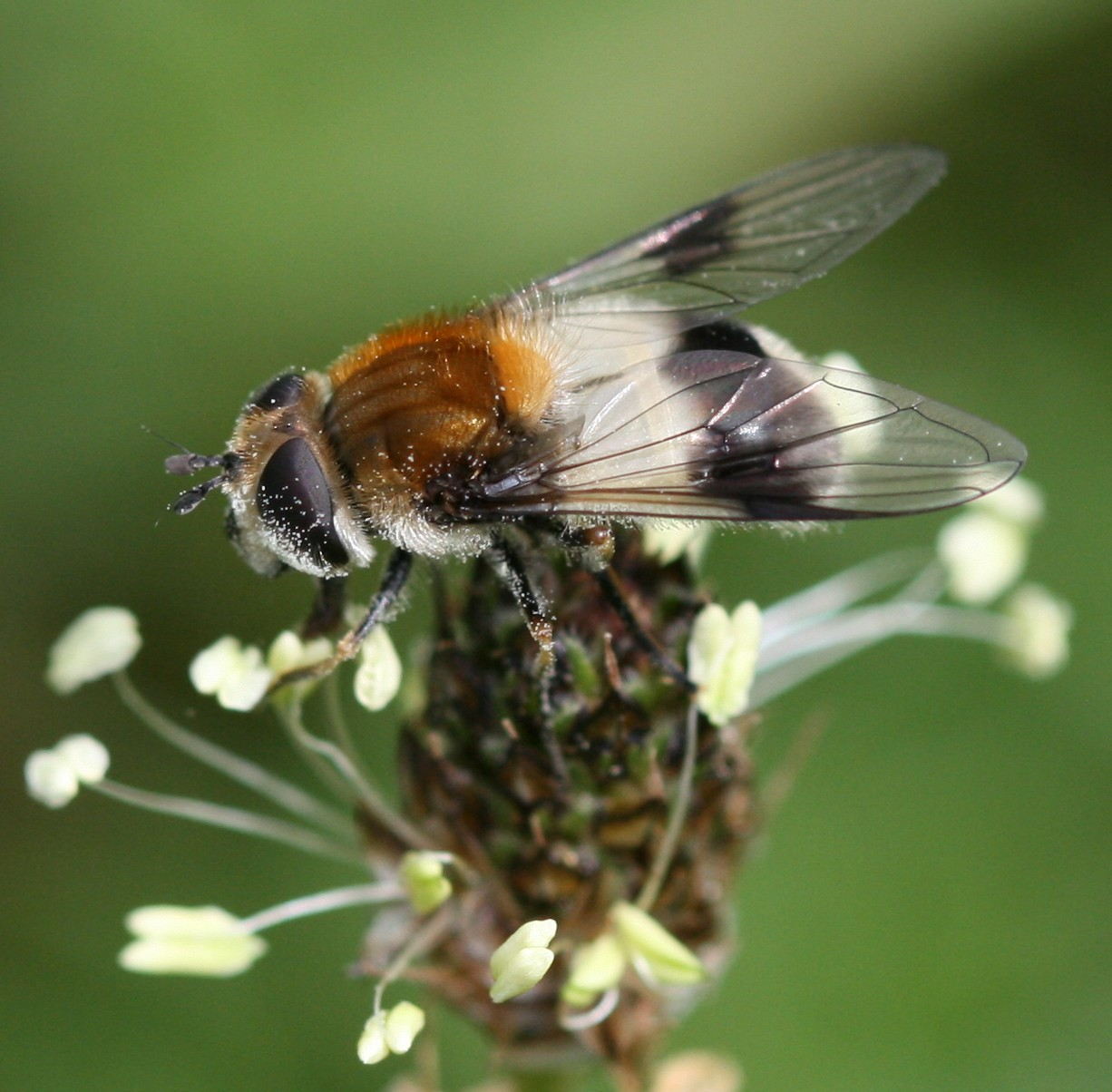
- Female

Scientific classification
- Kingdom: Animalia
- Phylum: Arthropoda
- Class: Insecta
- Order: Diptera
- Family: Syrphidae
- Genus: Leucozona
- Subgenus: Leucozona
- Species: L. lucorum

Binomial name
- Leucozona lucorum (Linnaeus, 1758)

Synonyms
- Leucozona pellucens (Harris, 1780); Musca lucorum Linnaeus, 1758; Musca pellucens Harris, 1780

= Leucozona lucorum =

Species of hoverfly

Leucozona lucorum is a Palearctic and Nearctic species of hoverfly.

== Description ==
Leucozona lucorum typically has a wing length of 7 ·75–10 mm. The face is yellow-dusted either side of the shining black median area. The thorax is yellowish-green with long reddish hairs, whilst the scutellum is yellow. The abdomen is black with long and abundant, partly pale yellow or whitish yellow and partly black hairs. A conspicuous brown spot can be found on the wings. The male genitalia and larvae are figured by Dusek and Laska (1967). The larva is figured in colour by Rotheray (1994). See references for determination.

== Distribution ==
Leucozona lucorum is widely distributed across the Palearctic and the Nearctic regions. In the Palearctic, it occurs from Fennoscandia south to the Pyrenees and North Spain and from Ireland east through North and Central Europe into Turkey and European Russia, the Russian Far East and Siberia and the Pacific coast (Kuril Islands and Japan). It is common in England. In the Nearctic, it occurs from Alaska south to Oregon and New York.

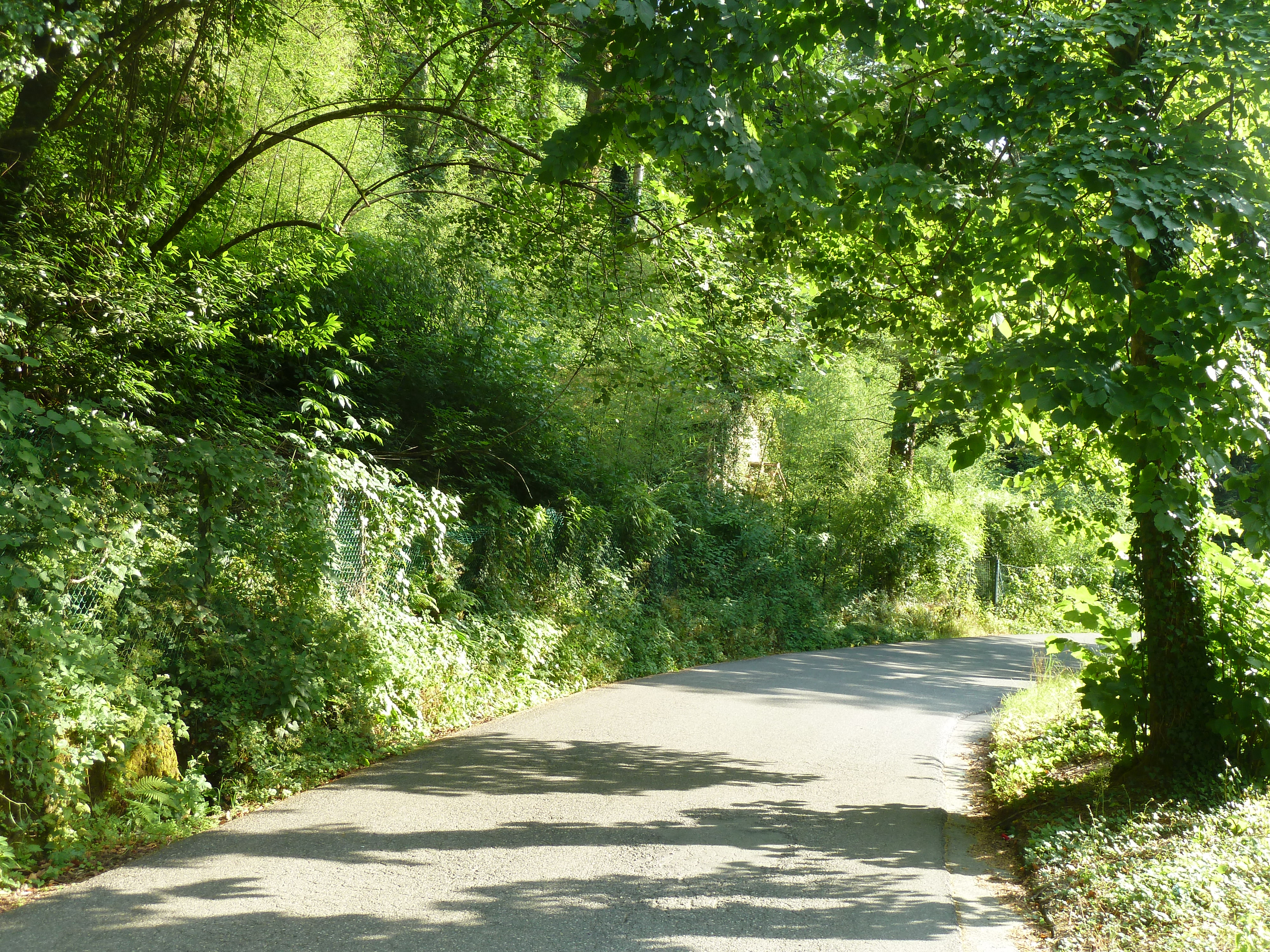
Habitat in Italy

== Biology ==
The typical habitat of the species consists of deciduous forest, especially around woodland rides and edges or unimproved montane grassland. Flowers visited include white umbellifers, Acer pseudoplatanus, Centaurea, Cirsium palustre, Euphorbia, Filipendula, Polygonum cuspidatum, Rubus, Sorbus aucuparia, Taraxacum. The flight period is May to August, normally peaking in June. The larvae feed on aphids on ground flora.
