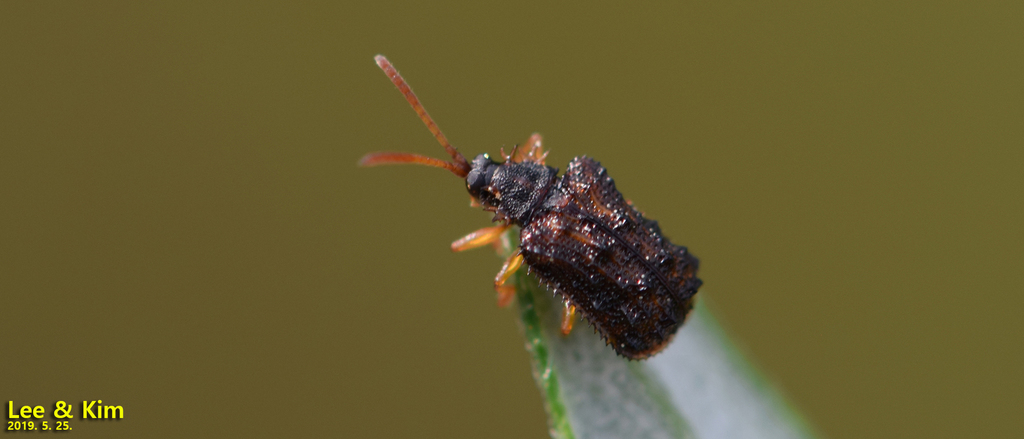

Scientific classification
- Kingdom: Animalia
- Phylum: Arthropoda
- Class: Insecta
- Order: Coleoptera
- Suborder: Polyphaga
- Infraorder: Cucujiformia
- Family: Chrysomelidae
- Genus: Dactylispa
- Species: D. angulosa

Binomial name
- Dactylispa angulosa (Solsky, 1872)

Synonyms
- Hispa angulosa Solsky, 1872; Hispa japonica Baly, 1874; Dactylispa masonii Gestro, 1923; Dactylispa ussurina Uhmann, 1928; Dactylispa flavomarginata Shirôzu, 1956; Dactylispa rufescens Shirôzu, 1957

= Dactylispa angulosa =

Species of beetle

Dactylispa angulosa is a species of beetle of the family Chrysomelidae. It is found in China (Anhui, Zhejiang, Fujian, Guangdong, Guangxi, Guizhou, Heilonjiang, Hebei, Hunan, Manchuria, Shaanxi, Szechuan, Yunnan), Japan, Korea, Russia (Siberia) and Taiwan.

This beetle was first described in 1872 by Semyon Martynovich Solsky as Hispa angulosa.

== Life history ==
The recorded host plants for this species are Filipendula palmata, Filipendula multifuga, Isodon inflexus, Prunella vulgaris lilacina, Prunus species, Rosa species, Quercus acutissima, Quercus myrsinaefolia, Quercus serrata, Bambusa species, Cyclobalanopsis glauca, Malus sylvestris, Prunella asiatica, Xylosma species, Polygonum perfoliatum, Pueraria montana var. lobata, Petasites japonicus and Betula platyphylla. They mine the mature leaves of their host plants. The mine has the form of an upper-layer aggregate blotch mine. The frass is granular and deposited throughout the mine. The fully grown larva pupates within the mine.

== Taxonomy ==
Dactylispa masonii is treated as a valid species by some authors.
