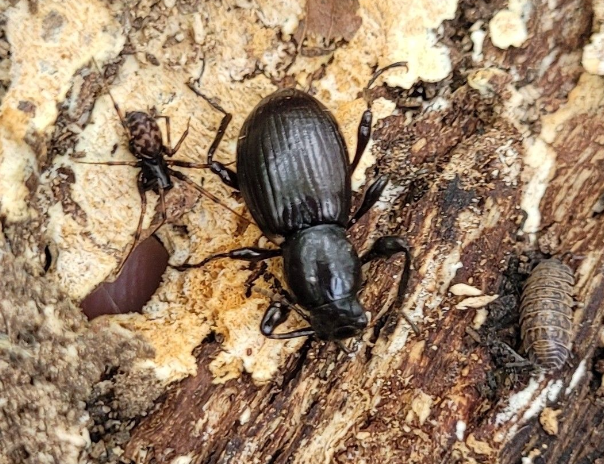
- Misolampidius tentyrioides

Scientific classification
- Kingdom: Animalia
- Phylum: Arthropoda
- Clade: Pancrustacea
- Class: Insecta
- Order: Coleoptera
- Suborder: Polyphaga
- Infraorder: Cucujiformia
- Superfamily: Tenebrionoidea
- Family: Tenebrionidae
- Subfamily: Stenochiinae
- Tribe: Cnodalonini
- Genus: Misolampidius; Solsky, 1876

= Misolampidius =

Genus of beetles

Misolampidius is a genus of darkling beetles in the tribe Cnodalonini, which was first described in 1876 by Semyon Martynovich Solsky. The type species is Misolampidius tentyrioides.

Species of this genus are found in China, Russia, Korea, and Japan.

== Species ==
Species listed by GBIF include:

- Misolampidius hisamatsui Ando, 2009
- Misolampidius tentyrioides Solsky, 1876

and a further species described in 2020:

- Misolampidius qiaoweipengi
