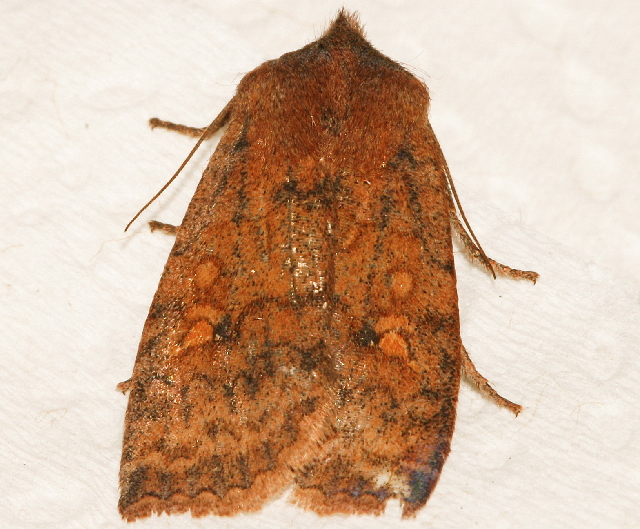

Scientific classification
- Kingdom: Animalia
- Phylum: Arthropoda
- Class: Insecta
- Order: Lepidoptera
- Superfamily: Noctuoidea
- Family: Noctuidae
- Genus: Eupsilia
- Species: E. tristigmata

Binomial name
- Eupsilia tristigmata (Grote, 1877)

= Eupsilia tristigmata =

Species of moth

Eupsilia tristigmata, known generally as the three-spotted sallow or brown fruitworm, is a species of cutworm or dart moth in the family Noctuidae. It is found in North America.

The MONA or Hodges number for Eupsilia tristigmata is 9935.
