= Leucozona xylotoides =

Scientific classification
- Domain: Eukaryota
- Kingdom: Animalia
- Phylum: Arthropoda
- Class: Insecta
- Order: Diptera
- Family: Syrphidae
- Tribe: Syrphini
- Genus: Leucozona
- Species: L. xylotoides

Binomial name
- Leucozona xylotoides (Johnson, 1916)

Synonyms
- Syrphus xylotoides Johnson, 1916

Species of fly

Leucozona xylotoides is a species of syrphid fly in the family Syrphidae.
