= Eupsilia devia =

Scientific classification
- Kingdom: Animalia
- Phylum: Arthropoda
- Class: Insecta
- Order: Lepidoptera
- Superfamily: Noctuoidea
- Family: Noctuidae
- Genus: Eupsilia
- Species: E. devia

Binomial name
- Eupsilia devia (Grote, 1875)

Species of moth

Eupsilia devia, the lost sallow, is a species of cutworm or dart moth in the family Noctuidae. It is found in North America.

The MONA or Hodges number for Eupsilia devia is 9939.
