= Nebria coreica =

Scientific classification
- Kingdom: Animalia
- Phylum: Arthropoda
- Class: Insecta
- Order: Coleoptera
- Suborder: Adephaga
- Family: Carabidae
- Genus: Nebria
- Species: N. coreica

Binomial name
- Nebria coreica Solsky, 1875

Species of beetle

Nebria coreica is a species of ground beetle in the Nebriinae subfamily that can be found in North Korea and Russia.
