= Eupsilia cirripalea =

Scientific classification
- Kingdom: Animalia
- Phylum: Arthropoda
- Class: Insecta
- Order: Lepidoptera
- Superfamily: Noctuoidea
- Family: Noctuidae
- Genus: Eupsilia
- Species: E. cirripalea

Binomial name
- Eupsilia cirripalea Franclemont, 1952

Species of moth

Eupsilia cirripalea, or Franclemont's sallow, is a species of cutworm or dart moth in the family Noctuidae. It is found in North America.

The MONA or Hodges number for Eupsilia cirripalea is 9934.
