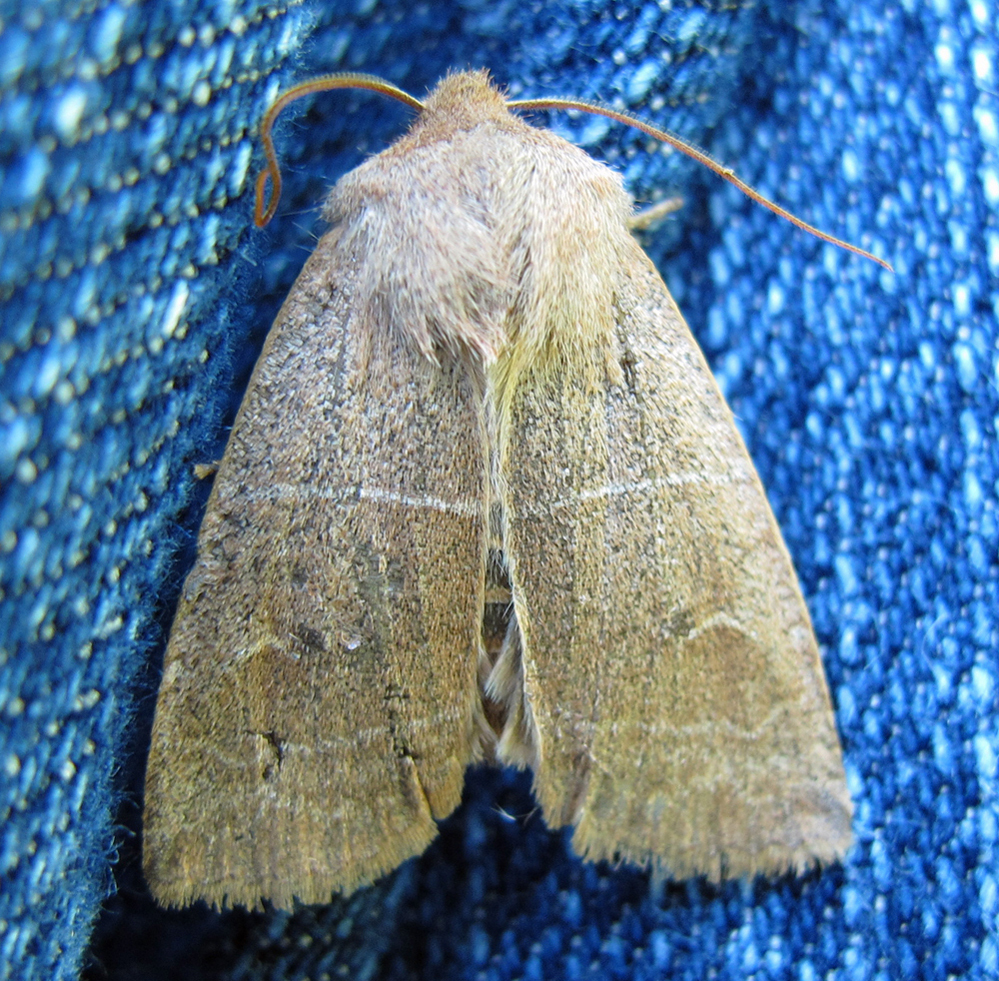

Scientific classification
- Kingdom: Animalia
- Phylum: Arthropoda
- Class: Insecta
- Order: Lepidoptera
- Superfamily: Noctuoidea
- Family: Noctuidae
- Genus: Eupsilia
- Species: E. morrisoni

Binomial name
- Eupsilia morrisoni (Grote, 1874)

= Eupsilia morrisoni =

Species of moth

Eupsilia morrisoni, or Morrison's sallow, is a species of cutworm or dart moth in the family Noctuidae. It is found in North America.

The MONA or Hodges number for Eupsilia morrisoni is 9936.
