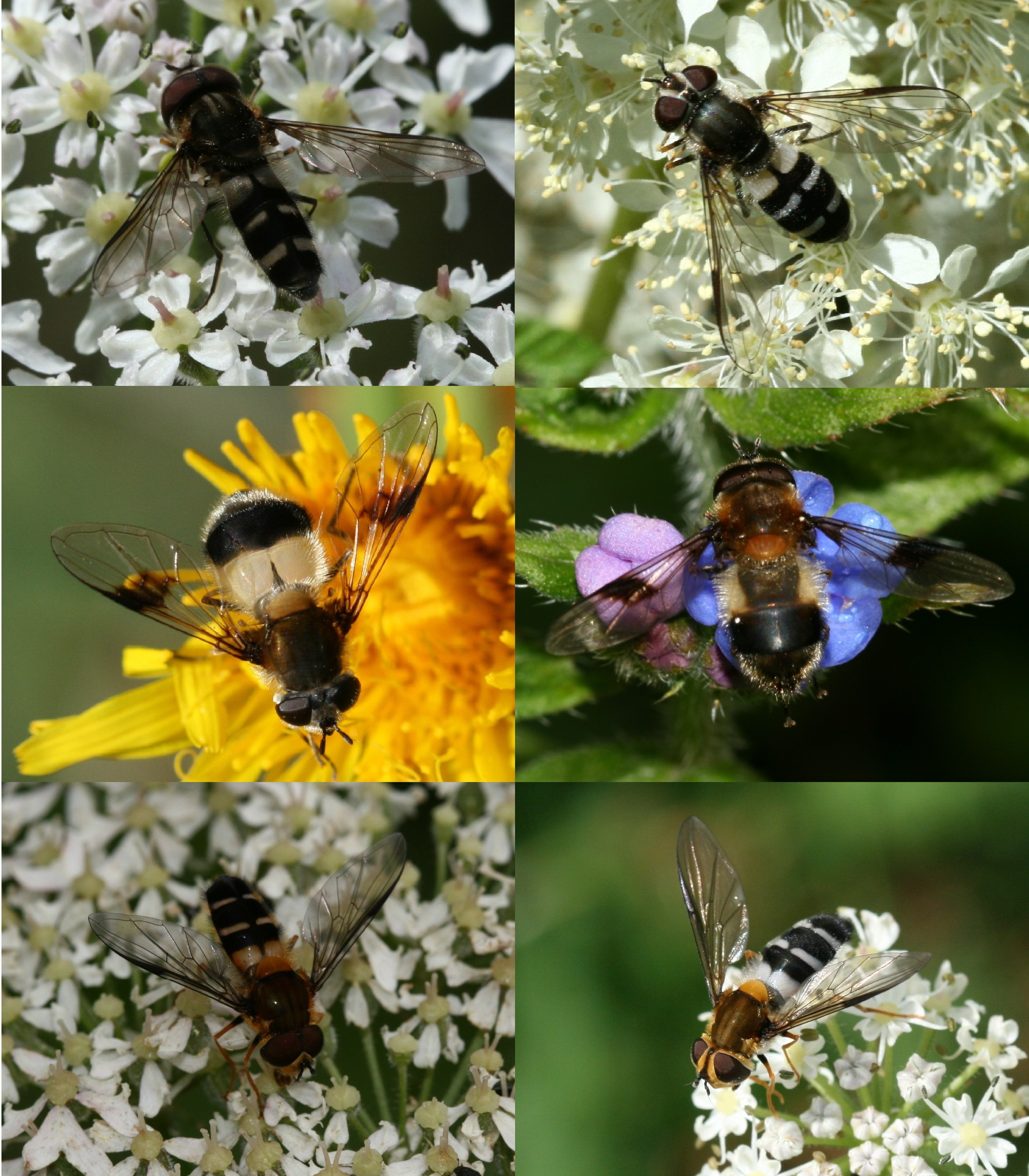

Scientific classification
- Kingdom: Animalia
- Phylum: Arthropoda
- Class: Insecta
- Order: Diptera
- Family: Syrphidae
- Subfamily: Syrphinae
- Tribe: Syrphini
- Genus: Leucozona; Schiner, 1860

Subgenera
- Leucozona Schiner, 1860; Ischyrosyrphus Bigot, 1882

= Leucozona =

Genus of flies

Leucozona is a genus of hoverflies. Species within this genus typically have a variegated pattern of dull and bright colours on the thorax and abdominal segments such as white or even blue (Leucozona glaucia). This colouration allows the hoverfly to mimic more predaceous bees and wasps, for example Leucozona lucorum.

== Species ==
- Leucozona glaucia (Linnaeus, 1758)
- Leucozona inopinata (Doczkal, 2000)
- Leucozona laternaria (Müller, 1776)
- Leucozona lucorum (Linnaeus, 1758)
- Leucozona velutina (Williston, 1882)
- Leucozona xylotoides (Johnson, 1916)
- Leucozona americana (Curran, 1923)
- Leucozona kingdonwardi (Ghorpade, 1994)
- Leucozona ussuriensis (Stackelberg, 1929)

== Gallery ==
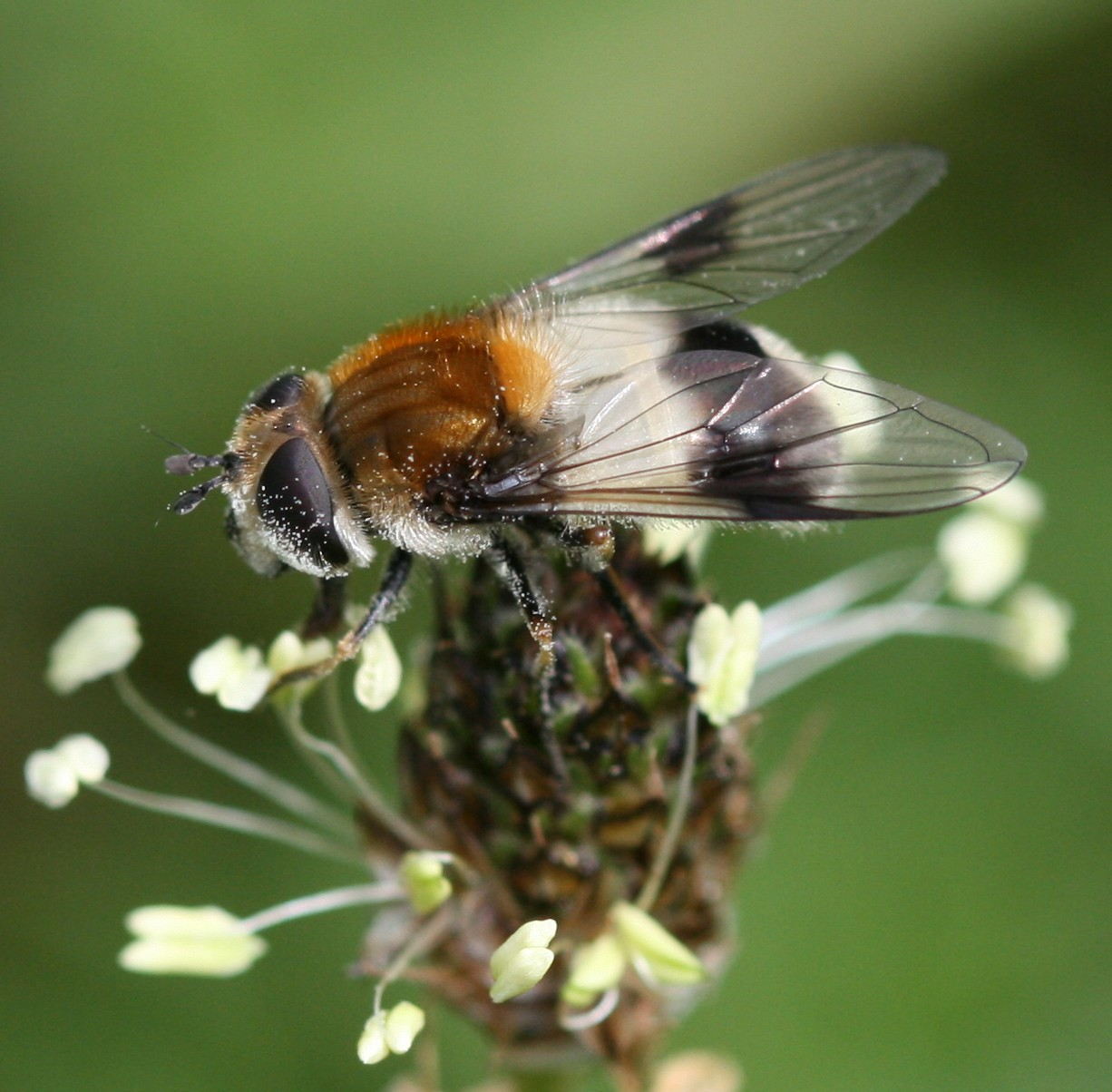
Leucozona lucorum

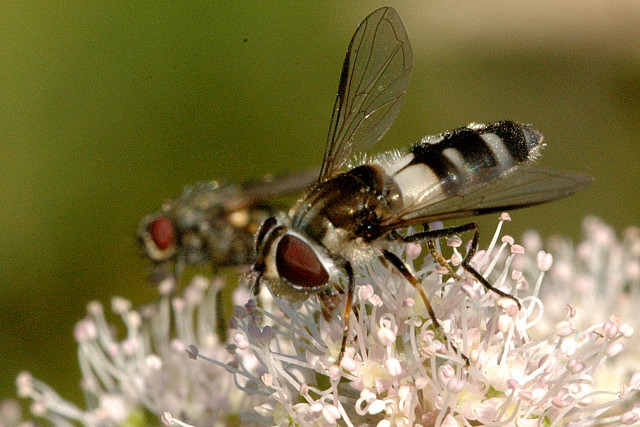
Leucozona laternaria

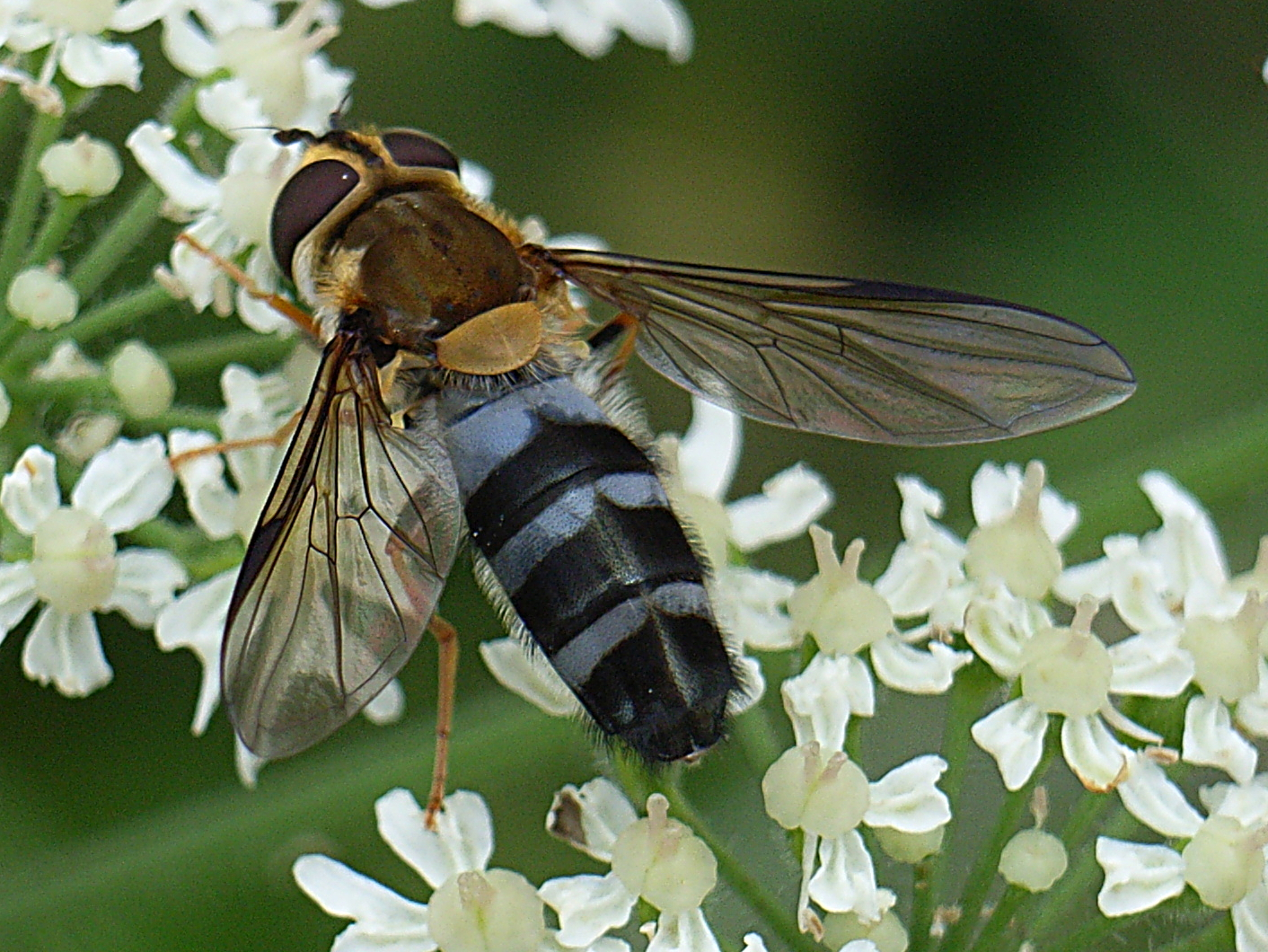
Leucozona glaucia
