= Eupsilia sidus =

Scientific classification
- Kingdom: Animalia
- Phylum: Arthropoda
- Class: Insecta
- Order: Lepidoptera
- Superfamily: Noctuoidea
- Family: Noctuidae
- Tribe: Xylenini
- Subtribe: Xylenina
- Genus: Eupsilia
- Species: E. sidus

Binomial name
- Eupsilia sidus (Guenee, 1852)

Species of moth

Eupsilia sidus, the sidus sallow, is a species of cutworm or dart moth in the family Noctuidae. It is found in North America.

The MONA or Hodges number for Eupsilia sidus is 9933.1.
