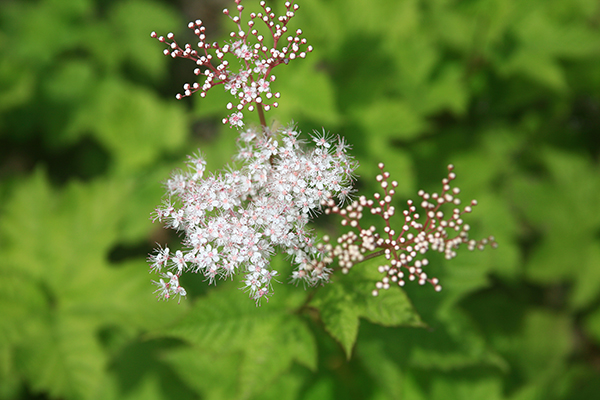

Scientific classification
- Kingdom: Plantae
- Clade: Tracheophytes
- Clade: Angiosperms
- Clade: Eudicots
- Clade: Rosids
- Order: Rosales
- Family: Rosaceae
- Genus: Filipendula
- Species: F. glaberrima

Binomial name
- Filipendula glaberrima Nakai 1902

= Filipendula glaberrima =

Species of flowering plant

Filipendula glaberrima, also called Korean meadowsweet, is a species of plant in the family Rosaceae that is native to Korea. The genus Filipendula is classified as a perennial herbaceous ornamental plant of the botanical family Rosaceae. The historical utilization of Filipendula plants in traditional medicine can be attributed to their diuretic, antiseptic, anti-rheumatic, stomachic, and antacid qualities. Plants belonging to the genus Filipendula have various beneficial properties, including antioxidant capacity, anticancer activity, anti-inflammatory effects, anti-colitis properties, anti-hyperalgesic properties, antigenotoxic effects, hepatoprotective activities, and skin-moisturizing properties.
