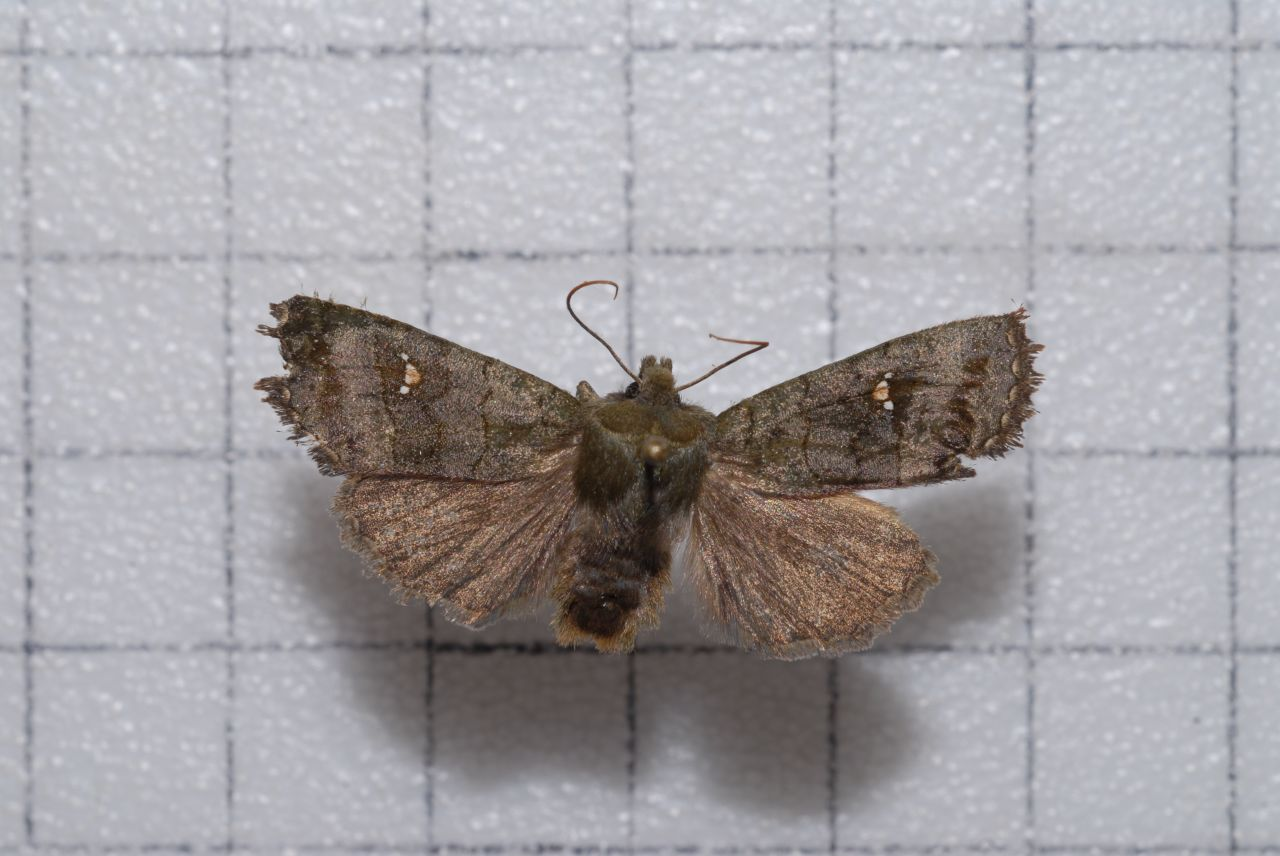

Scientific classification
- Domain: Eukaryota
- Kingdom: Animalia
- Phylum: Arthropoda
- Class: Insecta
- Order: Lepidoptera
- Superfamily: Noctuoidea
- Family: Noctuidae
- Genus: Eupsilia
- Species: E. virescens

Binomial name
- Eupsilia virescens Yoshimoto, 1985

= Eupsilia virescens =

Species of moth

Eupsilia virescens is a moth of the family Noctuidae. It is found in Taiwan.
