= Eupsilia fringata =

Scientific classification
- Kingdom: Animalia
- Phylum: Arthropoda
- Class: Insecta
- Order: Lepidoptera
- Superfamily: Noctuoidea
- Family: Noctuidae
- Genus: Eupsilia
- Species: E. fringata

Binomial name
- Eupsilia fringata (Barnes & McDunnough, 1916)

Species of moth

Eupsilia fringata is a species of cutworm or dart moth in the family Noctuidae first described by William Barnes and James Halliday McDunnough in 1916. It is found in North America.

The MONA or Hodges number for Eupsilia fringata is 9938.
