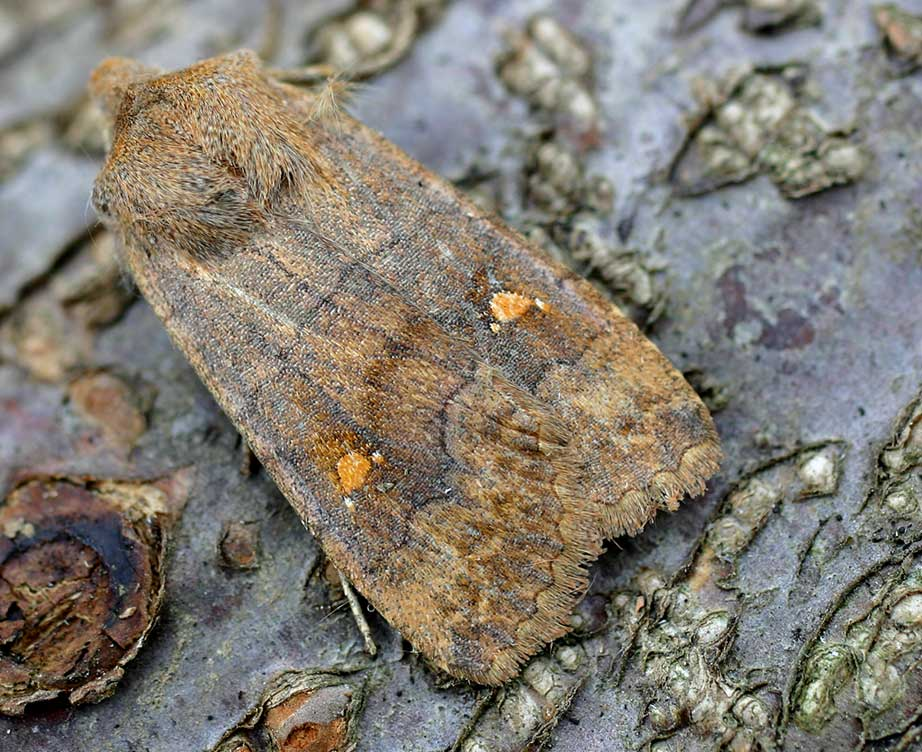

Scientific classification
- Kingdom: Animalia
- Phylum: Arthropoda
- Clade: Pancrustacea
- Class: Insecta
- Order: Lepidoptera
- Superfamily: Noctuoidea
- Family: Noctuidae
- Genus: Eupsilia
- Species: E. transversa

Binomial name
- Eupsilia transversa (Hufnagel, 1766)

= Satellite (moth) =

Species of moth

Eupsilia transversa, the satellite, is a moth of the family Noctuidae. The species was first described by Johann Siegfried Hufnagel in 1766. It is distributed throughout the Palearctic.

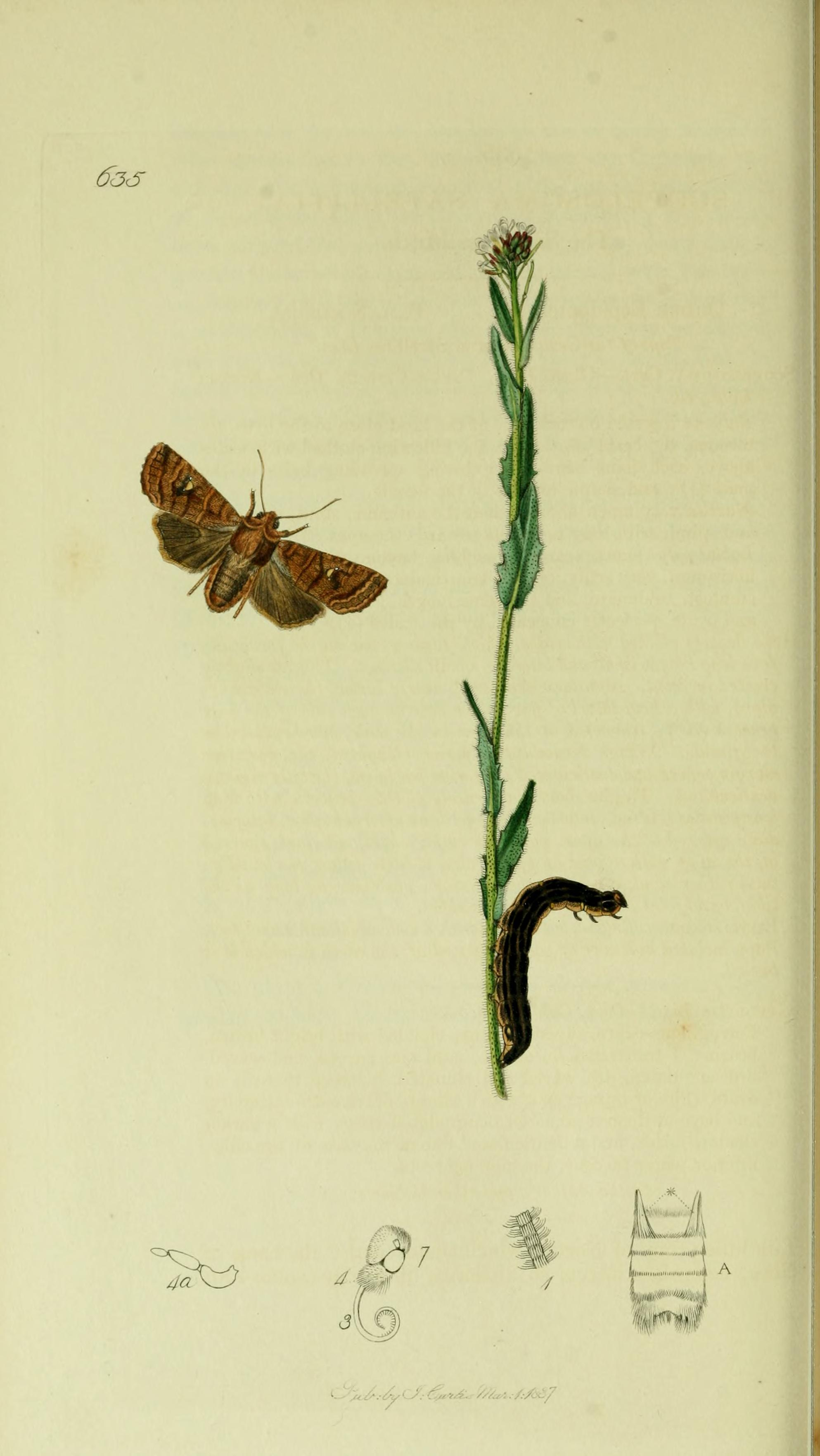
Illustration from John Curtis's British Entomology Volume 5

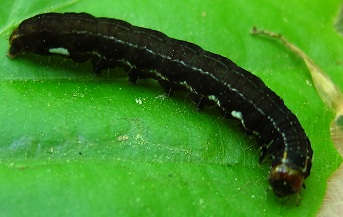
Larva

== Description ==
The moth has variable wing patterns, with a wingspan of 32-42mm.

The common name derives from the contrasting dots on each wing, ranging in colour from white or yellow to red, which has two smaller spots close to it, appearing to be in orbit. The hindwings are brown with a paler fringe.

=== Technical description and variation ===
Forewing grey brown, with deeper suffusion; inner and outer lines fine, and more or less erect, the inner straight, the outer waved; a bent median shade, one before the inner line, and another close beyond the outer; submarginal line pale, interrupted, preceded and followed by dark shades; claviform and orbicular stigmata obsolete; reniform in the type form orange yellow, with a white dot above and below it; fringe concolorous, preceded by pale marginal lunules; hindwing fuscous brown. Linne's type form, showing a yellow reniform with two white dots, especially in combination with the grey-brown ground colour, is decidedly rare; as a rule, when the reniform is yellow, the tendency is for the upper, and often the lower also, of the two dots to become yellow also; when all three spots are deep reddish orange we have the form brunnea Lampa; albipuncta Strand is the form with white reniform, in which the dots also are always white; the term rufescens Tutt, in which the ground colour is more or less rufous tinged, would apply to the more ordinary European form as well as to the British.

== Distribution ==
The species ranges from Ireland to Japan. Specifically, south to northern Spain, Sardinia, central Italy then North Macedonia, Bulgaria, Asia Minor and the Caucasus east to Central Asia and the Russian Far East and Siberia before reaching Japan. In the north, the geographical presence extends to Scotland and the Orkney Islands. Individuals have been reported in Iceland. In Fennoscandia, the range extends close to the Arctic Circle and includes northern Russia. The species is very tolerant to cold temperatures and has a very varied habitat – including open grasslands, forests, mountains (up to 1800 m in the Alps), and subarctic tundra.

== Life cycle ==
The larva usually feeds on trees and shrubs (see list below) but has also been recorded on dandelions and also frequently eats the larvae of other species.

The adult flies at night from Autumn to Spring in temperate climates. It has one generation a year.

The adult moths are attracted to sugar and light.

== Recorded food plants ==
- Acer – maple
- Amelanchier
- Betula – birch
- Castanea – chestnut
- Corylus – common hazel
- Crataegus – hawthorn
- Filipendula – meadowsweets
- Fraxinus – European ash
- Lonicera – honeysuckle
- Malus – apple
- Prunus
- Pyrus – pear
- Quercus – oak
- Ribes – redcurrant
- Rubus
- Salix – willow
- Sorbus – rowan
- Taraxacum – dandelion
- Tilia – lime
- Ulmus – elm
- Viburnum – guelder-rose

See Robinson, G. S. et al.
