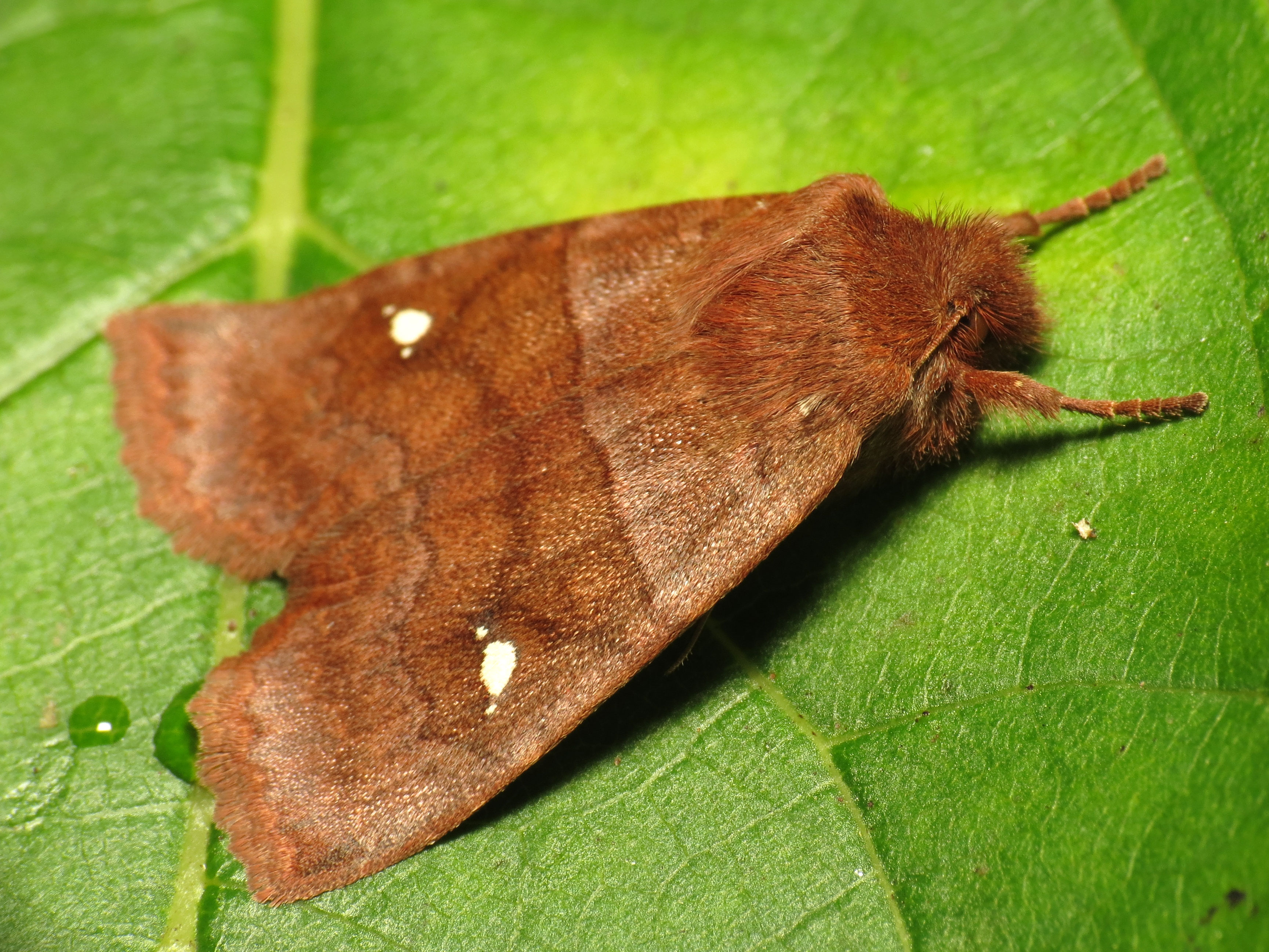

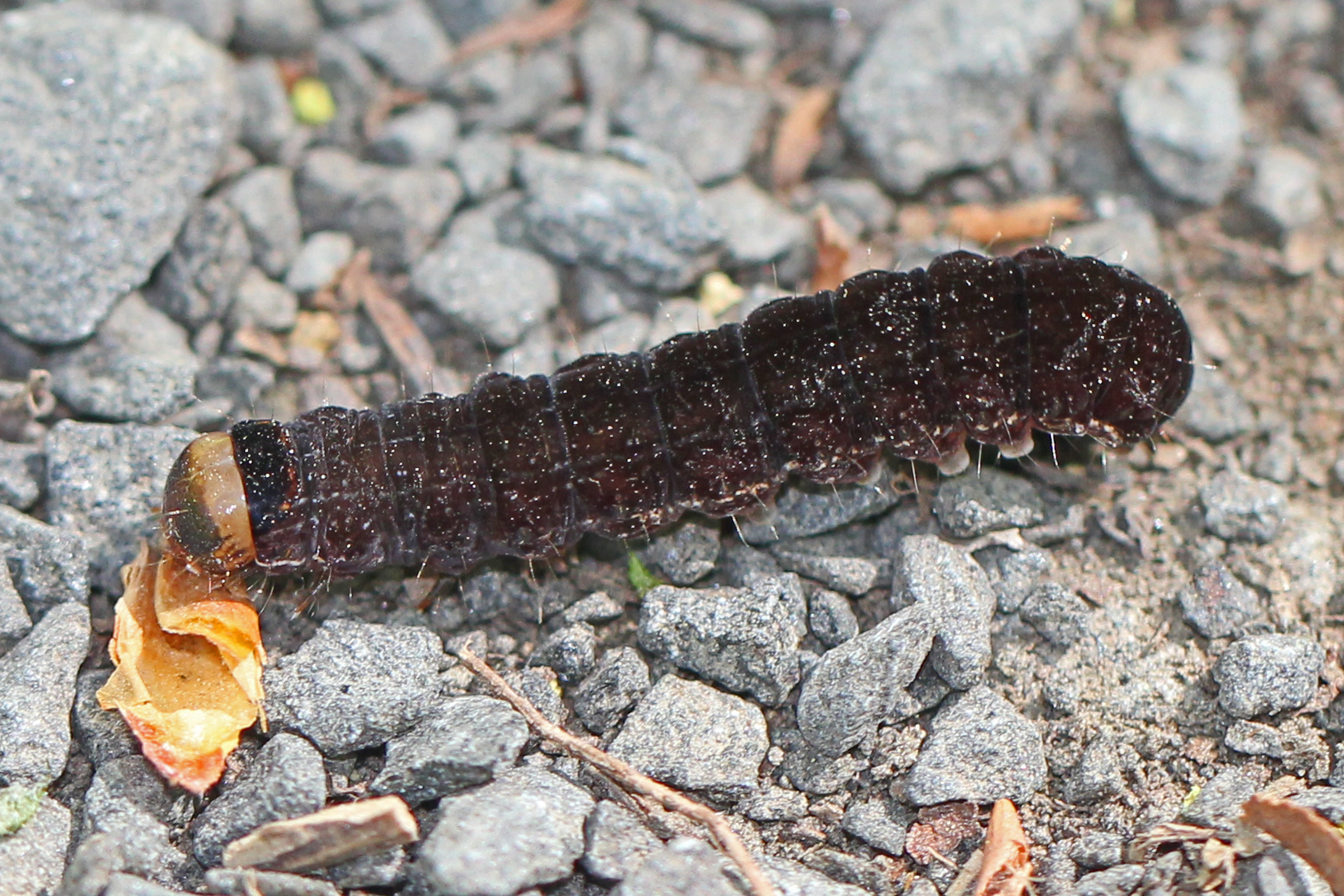
- Adult (top) and larva (bottom)

Scientific classification
- Kingdom: Animalia
- Phylum: Arthropoda
- Clade: Pancrustacea
- Class: Insecta
- Order: Lepidoptera
- Superfamily: Noctuoidea
- Family: Noctuidae
- Tribe: Xylenini
- Subtribe: Xylenina
- Genus: Eupsilia
- Species: E. vinulenta

Binomial name
- Eupsilia vinulenta (Grote, 1864)

= Eupsilia vinulenta =

Species of moth

Eupsilia vinulenta, the straight-toothed sallow moth, is a moth in the family Noctuidae described by Augustus Radcliffe Grote in 1864. It is found in North America.
