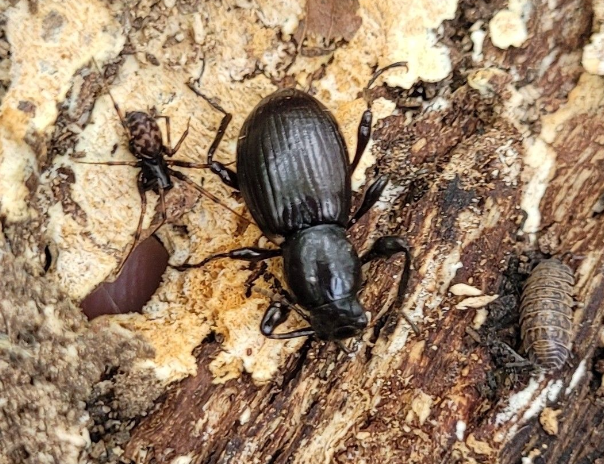

Scientific classification
- Kingdom: Animalia
- Phylum: Arthropoda
- Clade: Pancrustacea
- Class: Insecta
- Order: Coleoptera
- Suborder: Polyphaga
- Infraorder: Cucujiformia
- Family: Tenebrionidae
- Genus: Misolampidius
- Species: M. tentyrioides

Binomial name
- Misolampidius tentyrioides Solsky, 1876

= Misolampidius tentyrioides =

Species of insect

Misolampidius tentyrioides is a species of insect in the Cnodalonini tribe of the subfamily Stenochiinae. It was first described in 1876 by Semyon Martynovich Solsky.

It is found in East Asia: North & South Korea (Gangwon, Gangwon, Chungnam, Jeonbuk, Jeonnam, Gyeongbuk, Jeju), China (Jilin Province), and Russia (Eastern Siberia).
