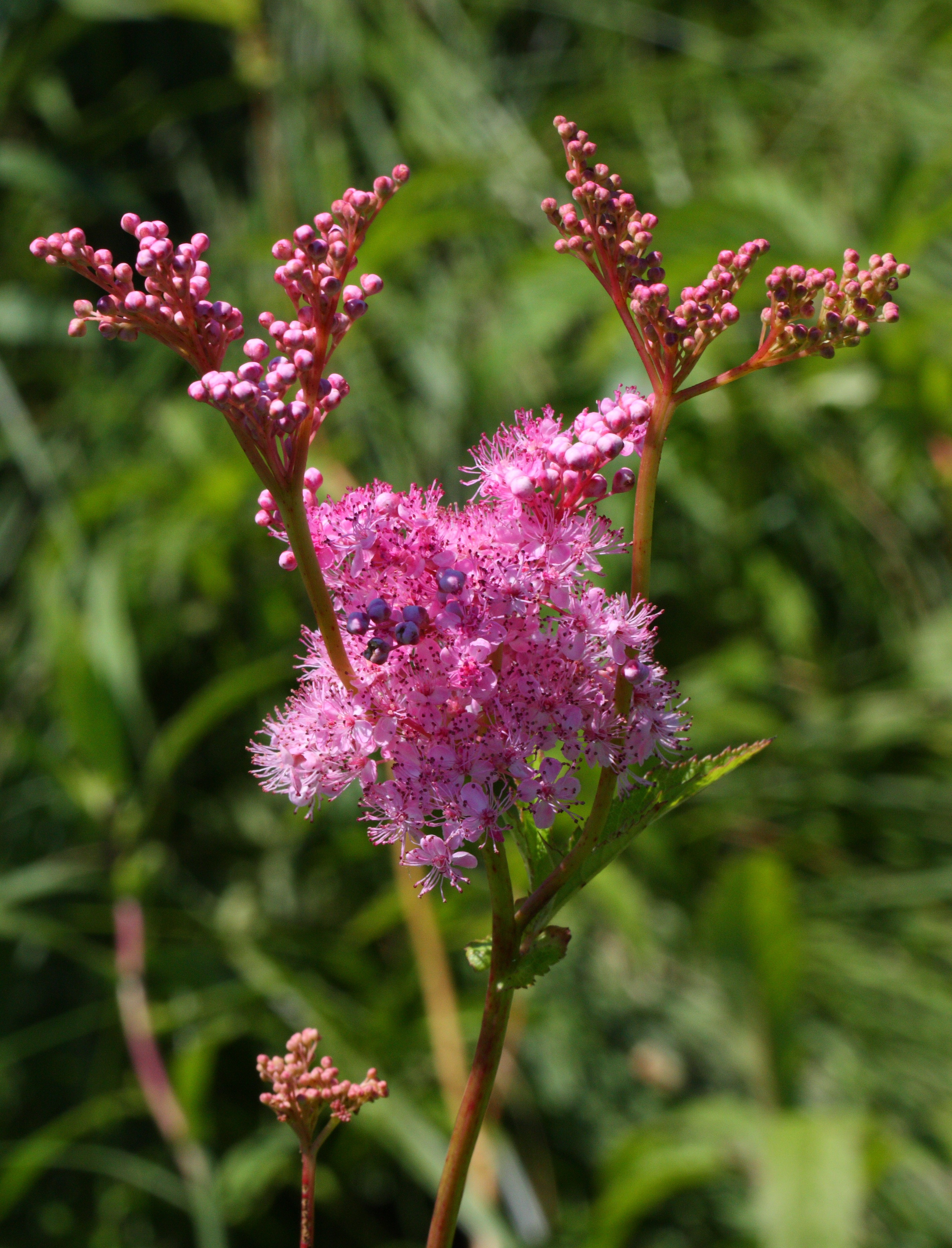
- Filipendula rubra Inflorescence

Conservation status
- Apparently Secure (NatureServe)

Scientific classification
- Kingdom: Plantae
- Clade: Tracheophytes
- Clade: Angiosperms
- Clade: Eudicots
- Clade: Rosids
- Order: Rosales
- Family: Rosaceae
- Genus: Filipendula
- Species: F. rubra

Binomial name
- Filipendula rubra (Hill) B.L.Rob.

Synonyms
- Filipendula lobata (Gronov. ex Jacq.) Maxim.; Spiraea lobata Gronov. ex Jacq.; Spiraea palmata L.; Spiraea rubra (Hill) Britton; Thecanisia angustifolia Raf.; Thecanisia lobata (Gronov. ex Jacq.) Raf.; Thecanisia purpurea Raf.; Ulmaria lobata Kostel. ex Maxim.; Ulmaria rubra Hill

= Filipendula rubra =

Species of flowering plant

Filipendula rubra, also known as queen-of-the-prairie, is a species of flowering plant in the family Rosaceae native to the northeastern and central United States and southeastern Canada. It prefers full sun or partial shade and moist soil, but tolerates drier soil in a shadier location. It grows tall and firm, and produces blooms that are tiny and pink above its ferny, pointy leaves.

Of the numerous garden cultivars, 'Venusta' has gained the Royal Horticultural Society's Award of Garden Merit.

== Distribution and habitat ==
The species is native from Pennsylvania westward to Illinois, and north of Georgia. However, F. rubra is fairly successful as an alien species in places such as Massachusetts, where it was first recorded in 1875 and is still found. In many places where it is native, such as Indiana, and places where it is alien as well, F. rubra is a threatened species.

The typical habitat of F. rubra is wetland plant communities, particularly calcareous fens, although it is occasionally found in spring seeps and wet prairies. Populations are generally small and widely separated from one another as a result of the rarity and smallness of calcareous fens.

== Description ==
The plant is a spreading herbaceous perennial growing to 1.8–2.5 m (5 ft 11 in – 8 ft 2 in) tall by 1.2 m (3 ft 11 in) wide. With large lobed leaves and branching red stems, it produces corymbs of deep pink or peach, sweet fragrant flowers in the summer. Inflorescences of F. rubra are panicles possessing 200–1,000 small pink-petaled flowers on 1–2 m stems can have somewhere to 5,000 seeds. The numerous stamens give the flower a fuzzy appearance. Each flower has carpels that are free from one another, while also having five to 15 pistils. However, these seeds are small due to the large size of its clones yet when seeds are produced seedlings may fail to establish in large numbers. The plant grows in an aggressive manner with its creeping roots. The foliage texture of the plant is coarse and the color ranges from a medium to dark green.

Filipendula rubra is a perennial which grows up to 2.5 m (8 ft) by 1.3 m (4 ft 3 in) at a medium rate. It is hardy to zone (UK) 2. It is in flower from July to August, and the seeds ripen from August to September. The species is hermaphrodite (has both male and female organs) and is self-fertile. The plant is pollinated by bees, flies, and beetles. The plant attracts wildlife.

=== Pollination ===
Filipendula rubra is known for its air-borne pollen, however pollination is only effective (can create a seed) when pollen is transferred to a different plant, due to the fact that F. rubra is self-incompatible. The vast majority of pollen will be derived from inflorescences within the same clone and thus incompatible. Pollination is aided by insects such as sweat bees spreading pollen.

== Conservation ==
Filipendula rubra is considered an endangered species by the USDA Natural Resources Conservation Service in Illinois, Maryland, New Jersey, North Carolina and it is considered threatened in Iowa and Michigan.

=== Causes for endangerment ===
Although Filipendula rubra is considered an endangered species by the USDA in several of the states that it is native to, it is not caused by animals who eat the plant, or any diseases that may infect a plant. Rather, F. rubra is considered endangered or threatened because of its trouble pollinating. The process the plant has to go through in order to pollinate is more difficult than that of regular plants due to its inability to fertilize itself (explained further in the section above about pollination). F. rubra is further endangered by habitat loss throughout much of its native distribution.

== Uses ==
Native Americans have used the root of F. rubra in traditional medicine for treating heart problems and as an aphrodisiac. The root has a high tannin content, making it useful as an astringent for treating diarrhea, dysentery, and bleeding.

The plant is used in gardens for the aesthetically pleasing and fragrant flowers which smell like lilac. A number of both native and conventional nurseries sell this species, yet it is still an uncommon plant in most American gardens and landscapes. 'Venusta' is the most common cultivar that bears a good bright rose-pink color. It grows in full sun or part-shade and needs moist to draining wet soil; it is drought sensitive. It produces leaves resembling those of Maple early in spring. It spreads by rhizomes, underground stems, so it becomes a spreading clump that eventually becomes a mass. It is easy to dig up and reset like many perennials when it gets too big and crowded or spreads to much. It has a tendency to spread by seed in the garden. Drought damage can be rectified by pruning and waiting for regrowth.

Although aesthetically appealing for humans, F. rubra, based on current knowledge of the plant's floral and faunal associations, offers comparatively little value to wildlife. For instance, it is not a host plant for butterflies and native moths nor does it produce any nectar. Its magenta flowers are the color that typically draws butterflies but they will expend energy to get to the flowers and find no nectar. It competes for continually shrinking, due to human development, wetland acreage with plants that support more wildlife. Additionally, its seeds are not an important food source for birds or rodents. Herbivores do not find its foliage appealing. Its flowers are a source of food for insects that consume pollen. However, some sources say the plant mainly uses wind pollination, a pollination strategy that typically makes comparatively little pollen available for pollen-consuming insects. As a result, some conservationists suggest using this plant in aesthetics-oriented gardens but focusing more on other species for restoration work.
