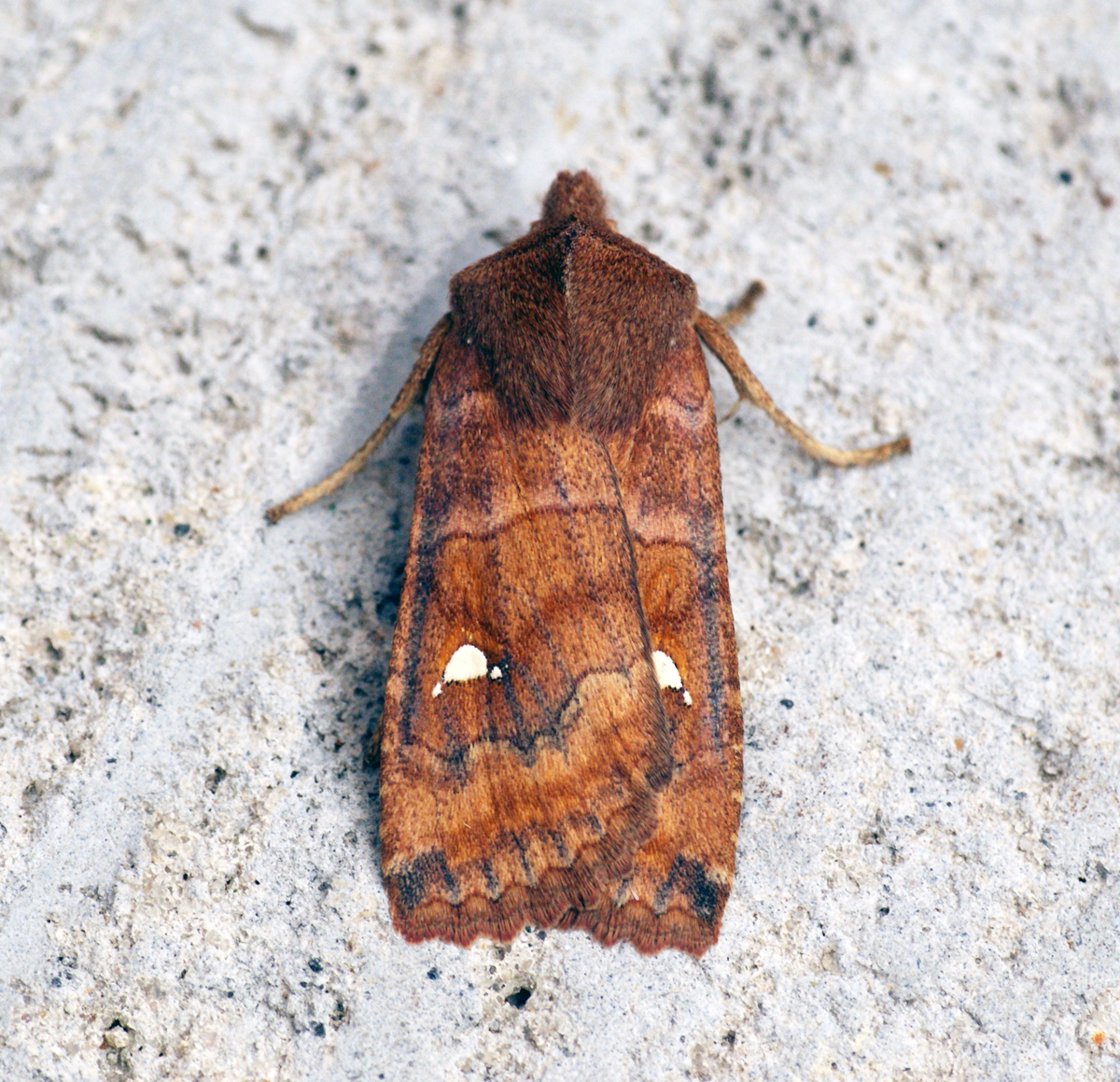
- Eupsilia transversa

Scientific classification
- Kingdom: Animalia
- Phylum: Arthropoda
- Clade: Pancrustacea
- Class: Insecta
- Order: Lepidoptera
- Superfamily: Noctuoidea
- Family: Noctuidae
- Subtribe: Xylenina
- Genus: Eupsilia; Hübner, [1821]

= Eupsilia =

Genus of moths

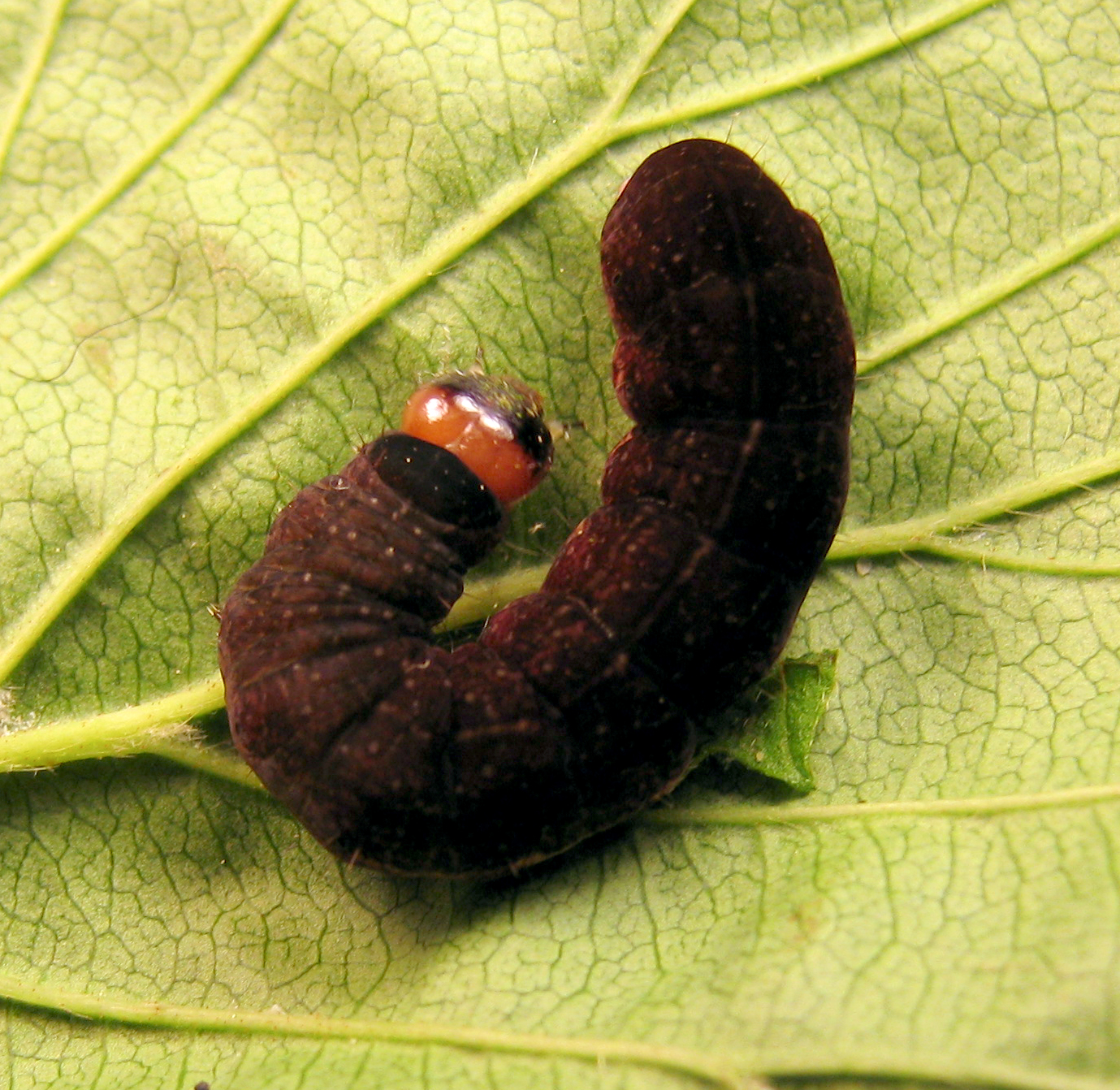
Eupsilia sp., caterpillar, final instar

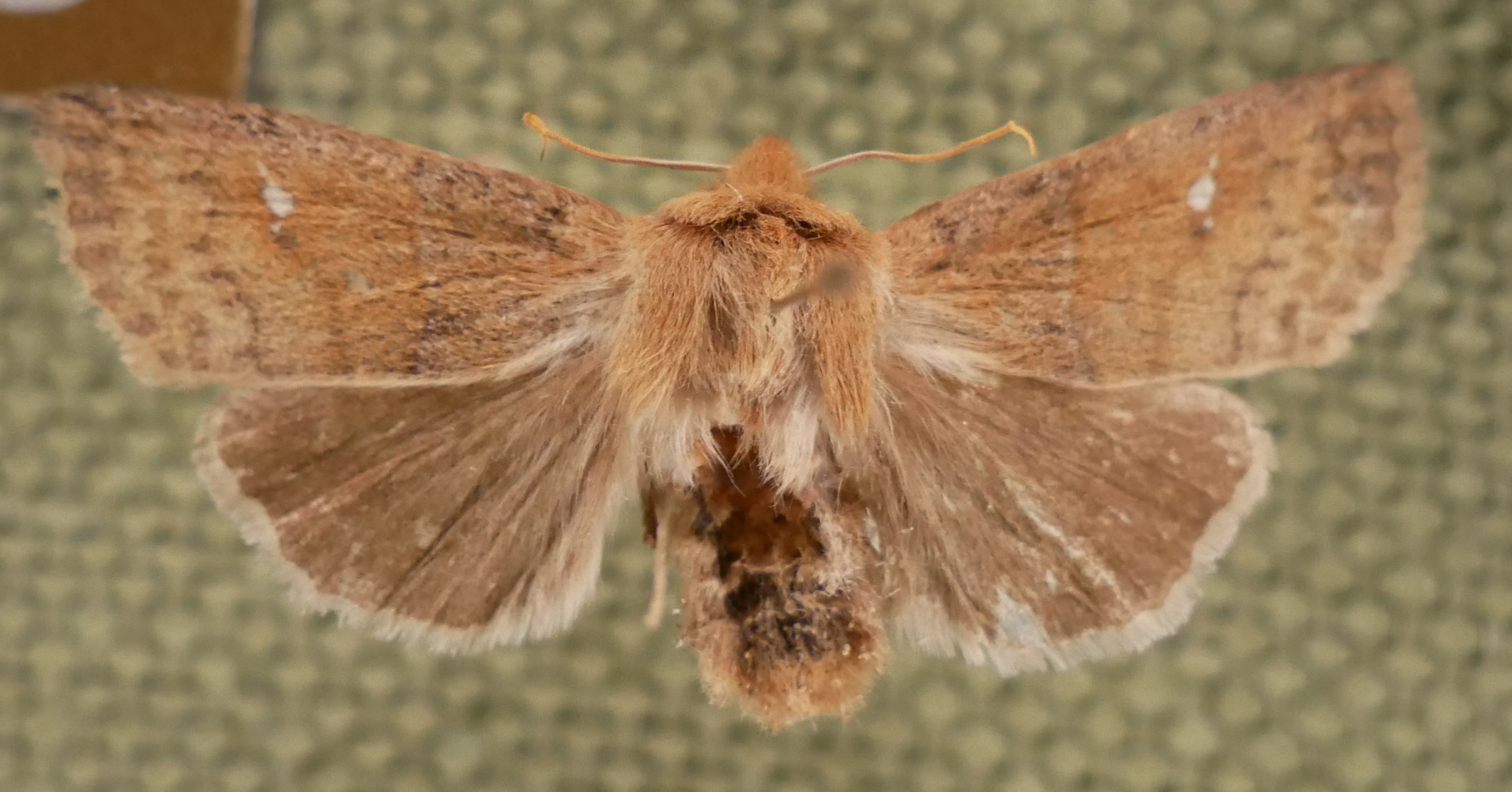
Eupsilia sp. museum specimen

Eupsilia is a genus of moths of the family Noctuidae.

The taxonomy is in question. One possibility is: subfamily Noctuinae, tribe Xylenini, subtribe Xylenina (Bugguide.net). Another alternative is: Subfamily Hadeninae (Biolib).

== Species ==
- Eupsilia boursini Sugi, 1958
- Eupsilia cirripalea Franclemont, 1952
- Eupsilia confusa Owada & Kobayashi, 1993
- Eupsilia contracta (Butler, 1878)
- Eupsilia cuprea Hreblay & Ronkay, 1998
- Eupsilia devia (Grote, 1874)
- Eupsilia fringata (Barnes & McDunnough, 1916)
- Eupsilia hidakaensis Sugi, 1987
- Eupsilia knowltoni McDunnough, 1946
- Eupsilia kurenzovi Kononenko, 1976
- Eupsilia morrisoni (Grote, 1874)
- Eupsilia parashyu Hreblay & Ronkay, 1998
- Eupsilia quadrilinea (Leech, 1889)
- Eupsilia quinquelinea Boursin, 1956
- Eupsilia shyu Chang, 1991
- Eupsilia sidus (Guenée, 1852)
- Eupsilia silla Kononenko & Ahn, 1998
- Eupsilia strigifera Butler, 1879
- Eupsilia transversa – Satellite (Hufnagel, 1766)
- Eupsilia tripunctata Butler, 1878
- Eupsilia tristigmata (Grote, 1877)
- Eupsilia unipuncta Scriba, 1919
- Eupsilia vinulenta (Grote, 1864)
- Eupsilia virescens Yoshimoto, 1985
