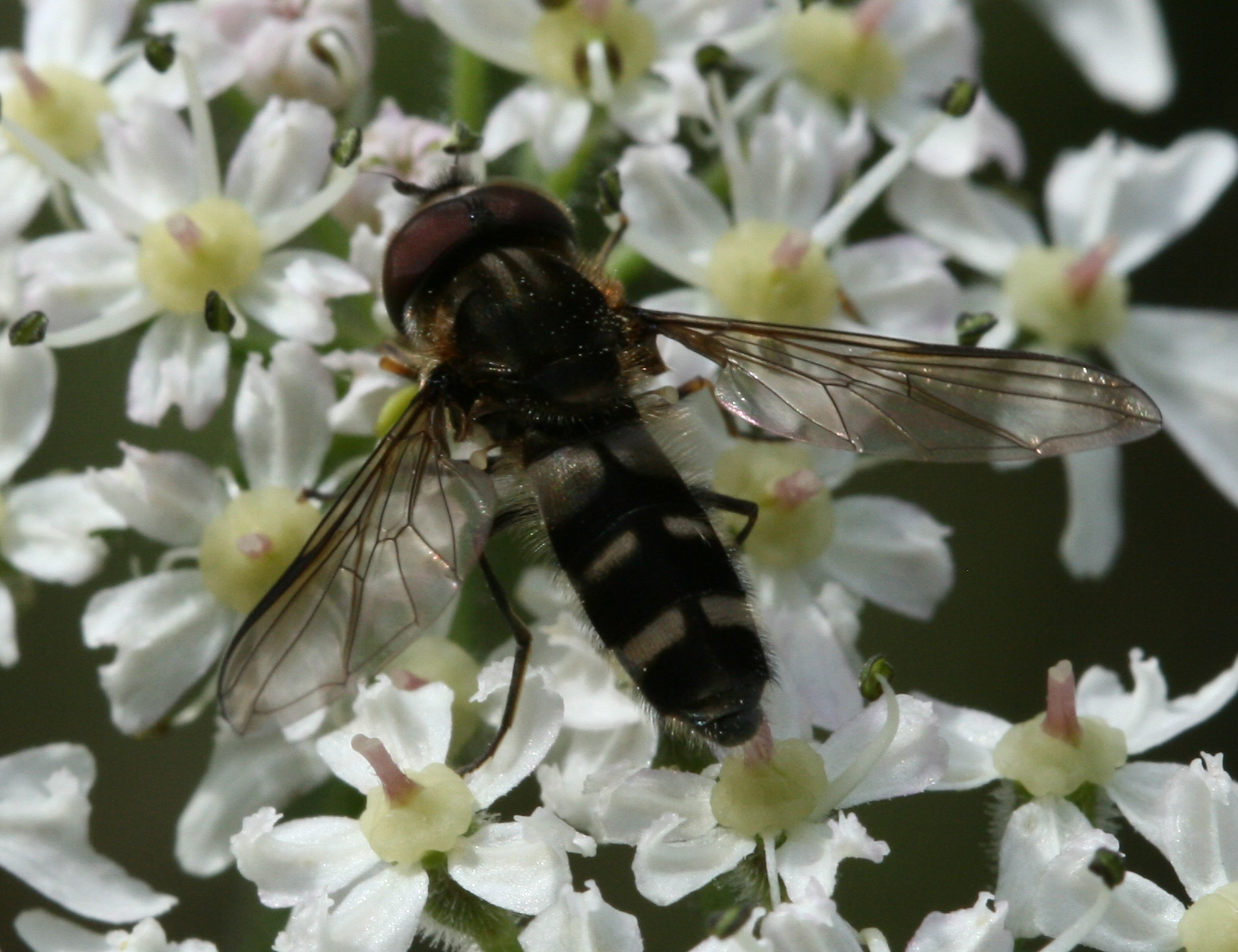
- Male
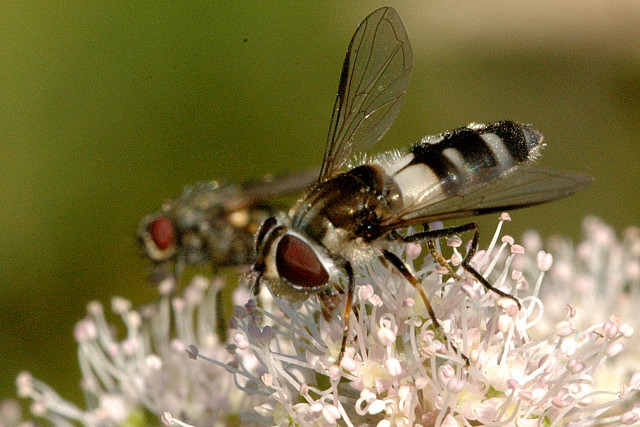
- Female

Scientific classification
- Kingdom: Animalia
- Phylum: Arthropoda
- Class: Insecta
- Order: Diptera
- Family: Syrphidae
- Genus: Leucozona
- Subgenus: Ischyrosyrphus
- Species: L. laternaria

Binomial name
- Leucozona laternaria (Müller, 1776)

Synonyms
- Musca laternaria Müller, 1776

= Leucozona laternaria =

Species of fly

Leucozona laternaria is a European species of hoverfly.

== Description ==
For terms see Morphology of Diptera
Wing length 7 to 10 mm (0.28 to 0.39 in). Scutellum black. Tergite 2 has large well separated silverish-white to yellowish- white marks (often merged).Tergites 3 and 4 have narrow or absent markings. The male terminalia are figured by Hippa (1968). See references for determination.

== Distribution ==
Palearctic from Fennoscandia South to the Pyrenees. Ireland East through North and Central Europe into Turkey and European Russia, then Russian Far East and Siberia and the Pacific coast (Kuril Islands and Japan).

== Biology ==
Habitat: Deciduous forest and wetland, along forest streams with Salix and Alnus scrub, fen carr. Flowers visited include white umbellifers, Cirsium arvense, Convolvulus, Filipendula ulmaria. The Flight period is June to August. The larvae feed on aphids on ground flora.
