= Leucozona velutina =

Scientific classification
- Domain: Eukaryota
- Kingdom: Animalia
- Phylum: Arthropoda
- Class: Insecta
- Order: Diptera
- Family: Syrphidae
- Tribe: Syrphini
- Genus: Leucozona
- Species: L. velutina

Binomial name
- Leucozona velutina (Williston, 1882)

Synonyms
- Ischyrosyrphus tricolor Bigot, 1884; Syrphus velutinus Williston, 1882

Species of fly

Leucozona velutina is a species of syrphid fly in the family Syrphidae.
