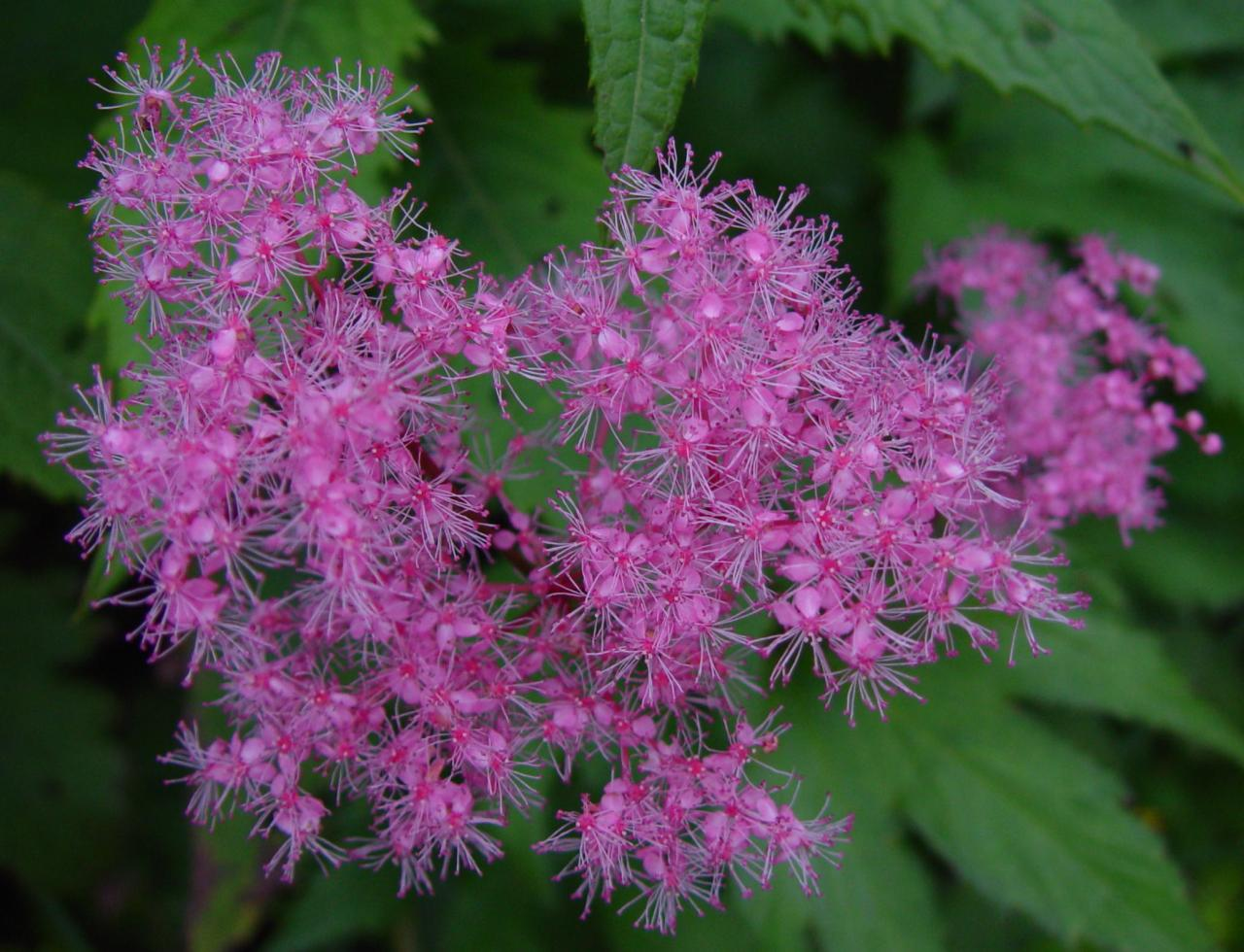

Scientific classification
- Kingdom: Plantae
- Clade: Tracheophytes
- Clade: Angiosperms
- Clade: Eudicots
- Clade: Rosids
- Order: Rosales
- Family: Rosaceae
- Genus: Filipendula
- Species: F. multijuga

Binomial name
- Filipendula multijuga Maxim.

Synonyms
- Homotypic Synonyms: Spiraea multijuga (Maxim.) Wenz.; Ulmaria multijuga (Maxim.) Matsum.

= Filipendula multijuga =

Species of flowering plant

Filipendula multijuga is a species of flowering plant in the family Rosaceae. It is endemic to Japan.
