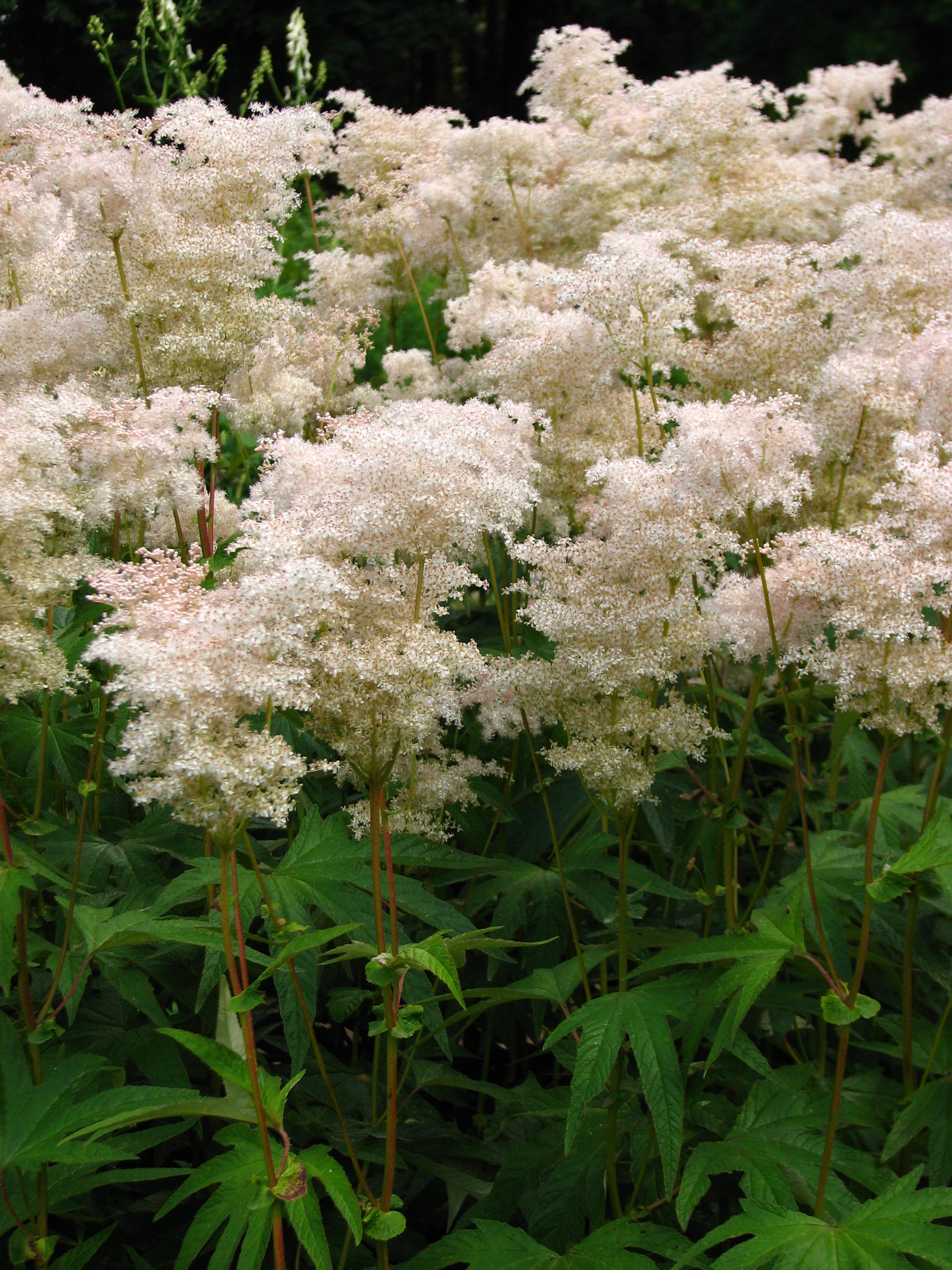

Scientific classification
- Kingdom: Plantae
- Clade: Tracheophytes
- Clade: Angiosperms
- Clade: Eudicots
- Clade: Rosids
- Order: Rosales
- Family: Rosaceae
- Genus: Filipendula
- Species: F. palmata

Binomial name
- Filipendula palmata (Pall.) Maxim. 1879

= Filipendula palmata =

Species of flowering plant

Filipendula palmata is a species of plant in the family Rosaceae that is native to China.
