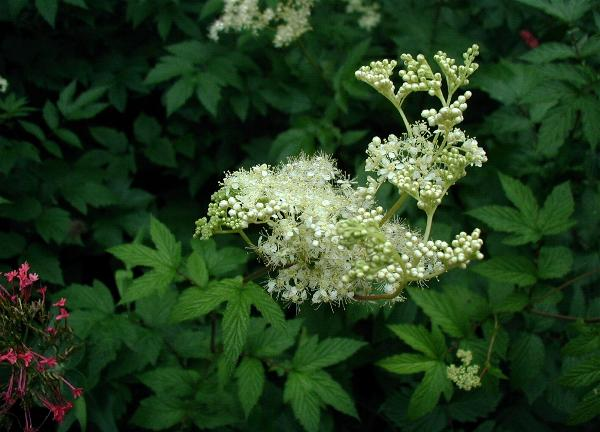
- Filipendula ulmaria

Scientific classification
- Kingdom: Plantae
- Clade: Tracheophytes
- Clade: Angiosperms
- Clade: Eudicots
- Clade: Rosids
- Order: Rosales
- Family: Rosaceae
- Subfamily: Rosoideae
- Tribe: Ulmarieae
- Genus: Filipendula; Mill. (1754)

Species
- Filipendula angustiloba; Filipendula glaberrima; Filipendula kamtschatica; Filipendula kiraishiensis; Filipendula multijuga; Filipendula occidentalis; Filipendula palmata; Filipendula purpurea; Filipendula rubra; Filipendula ulmaria; Filipendula vestita; Filipendula vulgaris

= Filipendula =

Genus of plants

Filipendula is a genus of 12 species of perennial herbaceous flowering plants in the family Rosaceae, native to the temperate regions of the Northern Hemisphere. Well-known species include meadowsweet (Filipendula ulmaria) and dropwort (Filipendula vulgaris), both native to Europe, and queen-of-the-forest (Filipendula occidentalis) and queen-of-the-prairie (Filipendula rubra), native to North America.

The species grow to between 0.5–2 m tall, with large inflorescences of small five-petalled flowers, creamy-white to pink-tinged in most species, dark pink in F. rubra. Filipendula fruit are unusual, sometimes described as an indehiscent follicle, or as an achene.

Filipendula species are used as food plants by the larvae of some Lepidoptera species: emperor moth, grey pug, grizzled skipper, Hebrew character, lime-speck pug, mottled beauty and the satellite have all been recorded on meadowsweet.

The species were in the past sometimes treated in a broad view of the genus Spiraea, but genetic research has shown that they are less closely related than previously considered.

The genus name Filipendula derives from the Latin words filum "thread" and pendulus "hanging", referring to the tubers of F. vulgaris, which are attached to one other by thread-like roots.
