= Semyon Martynovich Solsky =

Russian entomologist (1831–1879)

- Семён Мартынович Сольский
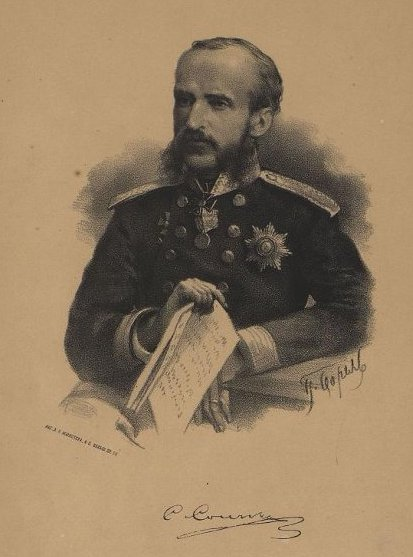
- Born: July 27, 1831; St Petersburg
- Died: 11 February 1879 (aged 47); St Petersburg
- Citizenship: Russian Empire
- Education: University of St Petersburg
- Scientific career
- Fields: entomology, coleopterology
- Author abbrev. (zoology): Solsky

Semyon Martynovich Solsky (Russian: Семён Мартынович Сольский, 1831 – 1879) was a Russian entomologist. He was educated at the Larinskaya Gymnasium (1848), and then at the University of St. Petersburg, completing his degree in 1852. in October 1852 he entered service in the office of the Russian Ministry of War, where he served until February 1878, when he was appointed a member of the Military District Council of the St. Petersburg Military District.

At university, Solsky developed a love of entomology, to which he subsequently devoted all his free time. He was particularly active in the study of beetles and was considered one of the leading coleopterists of his time. He was one of the founders of the Russian Entomological Society, which he subsequently served for many years as secretary, librarian, and later vice-president (until 1878). He was an honorary member of the "Société humanitaire et scientifique du SO de la France" and a corresponding member of the "Société Entomologique Belge," " Societá Entomologica Italiana," " Société Entomologique de France" "Schweizerische Entomologische Gesellschaft," "Entomologische Verein zu Berlin," the Imperial Russian Geographical Society , and many other scientific societies.

An honorary member of the St. Petersburg Society of Naturalists, he was involved in identifying beetles in the society's collections. His own extensive entomological collection was acquired after his death by the St. Petersburg Academy of Sciences. He died in St. Petersburg on February 11, 1879, and was buried in the Smolensk Orthodox Cemetery (However, his grave has been lost).

== Taxa named in his honour ==
- Carabus solskyi (Ballion, 1878)
- Solskyana Dolin, 1978

== Some taxa he first described ==
- Dactylispa angulosa (Solsky, 1872)
- Agrypnus argillaceus (Solsky, 1871 )
- Stenophanes mesostena (Solsky, 1871)
- Nebria coreica Solsky , 1875
- Misolampidius tentyrioides Solsky, 1876
- Pidonia puziloi (Solsky, 1873)
- Episcapha morawitzi (Solsky, 1871)
- Agrilus smaragdinus Solsky, 1876
- Ropalopus signaticollis Solsky, 1872
