= List of Strongylium species =

These 309 species are among more than 700 that belong to the genus Strongylium, darkling beetles.

== Strongylium species ==
- Strongylium acraeum Garrido & Armas, 2012
- Strongylium akitai Masumoto, 1998
- Strongylium akiyamai Masumoto, 2003
- Strongylium albopilosum Gebien, 1913
- Strongylium algoense
- Strongylium alishanum Masumoto, 1981
- Strongylium amethystinum
- Strongylium andoi Masumoto, 1996
- Strongylium angustissimum Pic, 1922
- Strongylium anmashanum Masumoto, Akita & Lee, 2008
- Strongylium anthrax Schwarz
- Strongylium apache Triplehorn & Spilman, 1973
- Strongylium atrum Champion, 1887
- Strongylium attapuense Masumoto & Akita, 2013
- Strongylium aulicum
- Strongylium auratopubens Pic, 1922
- Strongylium auratum (Laporte, 1840)
- Strongylium auspicatum
- Strongylium azureum (Germar, 1823)
- Strongylium baetianum Garrido & Armas, 2012
- Strongylium basiclavis Zayas, 1988
- Strongylium becvari Masumoto, 1998
- Strongylium belti Champion, 1888
- Strongylium bicarinatoides Kaszab
- Strongylium bifasciatum Maklin, 1864
- Strongylium bilineatocolle Pic, 1918
- Strongylium bilyi Masumoto, 1998
- Strongylium birmanicum Masumoto, 1998
- Strongylium bivittatum Champion, 1888
- Strongylium blairi Gebien, 1920
- Strongylium bolikhamsaiense Masumoto & Akita, 2012
- Strongylium bremeri Masumoto, 1998
- Strongylium brevipes Champion, 1888
- Strongylium burckhardti Masumoto, 2003
- Strongylium caelatum
- Strongylium canaliculatum Champion, 1887
- Strongylium carbonarium Gebien, 1913
- Strongylium carinipenne Champion, 1888
- Strongylium carinulatum Mäklin, 1864
- Strongylium cayennense Mäklin, 1864
- Strongylium chalcopterum Mäklin, 1864
- Strongylium champasakense Masumoto & Akita, 2013
- Strongylium championi Gebien, 1948
- Strongylium chiangdaoense Masumoto, 1996
- Strongylium chihpenense Masumoto, 2005c
- Strongylium chiriquense Champion, 1887
- Strongylium chontalense Champion, 1887
- Strongylium chutungense Masumoto, 2005c
- Strongylium cicindeliforme Masumoto, 1998
- Strongylium clauda (Gebien, 1913)
- Strongylium clavicorne Champion, 1893
- Strongylium cochinchinense Masumoto, 1997
- Strongylium coeruleipes Pic, 1940
- Strongylium colombianum Champion, 1888
- Strongylium compactum
- Strongylium conradti Champion, 1893
- Strongylium costaricense Champion, 1888
- Strongylium costipenne Mäklin, 1864
- Strongylium crassicorne Champion, 1887
- Strongylium crenatum Maklin
- Strongylium crockerense Masumoto, 1997
- Strongylium crurale Fairmaire, 1893
- Strongylium cultellatum
- Strongylium cupeyal Zayas, 1988
- Strongylium cupricolle Mäklin, 1864
- Strongylium cuproso Garrido, 2004
- Strongylium curticorne Champion, 1888
- Strongylium cyaneomaculatum Pic, 1918
- Strongylium cyaneum
- Strongylium delauneyi Fleutiaux
- Strongylium dembickyi Masumoto, 1998
- Strongylium dentatum Champion, 1887
- Strongylium dilutipes Masumoto & Akita, 2011
- Strongylium discrepans
- Strongylium doipuiense Masumoto, 1996
- Strongylium doisuthepense Masumoto, 1996
- Strongylium elongatum Garrido & Armas, 2012
- Strongylium emasense Masumoto & Akita, 2011
- Strongylium endoi Masumoto, 1982
- Strongylium erraticum Champion, 1888
- Strongylium erythrocephalum (Fabricius, 1801)
- Strongylium erythropterum Mäklin, 1864
- Strongylium exaratum Champion, 1887
- Strongylium excavatipenne Pic, 1918
- Strongylium fangense Masumoto, 1996
- Strongylium fasciolatum Mäklin, 1864
- Strongylium formosanum Gebien, 1913
- Strongylium fossulatum
- Strongylium fragile Champion, 1888
- Strongylium frontale Champion, 1888
- Strongylium fujitai Masumoto, 1981
- Strongylium gibbum Mäklin, 1867
- Strongylium girardianum Masumoto, 1996
- Strongylium grande Pic, 1935
- Strongylium gravidum Mäklin, 1864
- Strongylium gregarium Champion, 1888
- Strongylium guadeloupense Gebien, 1911
- Strongylium haucki Masumoto & Akita, 2013
- Strongylium hemistriatum Triplehorn & Spilman, 1973
- Strongylium hideoi Masumoto, 1996
- Strongylium hirasawai Masumoto, 1996
- Strongylium hmongense Masumoto, 1998
- Strongylium hoepfneri
- Strongylium holzschuhi Masumoto & Akita, 2012
- Strongylium horaki Masumoto, 1998
- Strongylium horni Oertzen, 1903
- Strongylium hsiaoi Masumoto, Akita & Lee, 2008
- Strongylium huaianaense Masumoto & Akita, 2011
- Strongylium huaipoense Masumoto, 1998
- Strongylium ignitum Champion, 1887
- Strongylium imitator
- Strongylium indigeus
- Strongylium indignum Gebien, 1920
- Strongylium insulare
- Strongylium iricolor Ardoin, 1973
- Strongylium ishizakii Masumoto, 2003
- Strongylium itoi Masumoto, 1998
- Strongylium jae Masumoto, 1996
- Strongylium kalimantanense Masumoto, 1997
- Strongylium kambaitiense Masumoto, 1998
- Strongylium kanchanaburiense Masumoto, 1998
- Strongylium kariangense Masumoto, 1998
- Strongylium katsumii Masumoto, 1999
- Strongylium keningauense Masumoto, 1997
- Strongylium kenokokense Masumoto, 1998
- Strongylium kentingense Masumoto, 1981
- Strongylium kerleyi Masumoto, 1996
- Strongylium khamense Masumoto & Akita, 2014
- Strongylium khammouanense Masumoto & Akita, 2012
- Strongylium khaolakense Masumoto & Akita, 2011
- Strongylium khaosoidaoense Masumoto, 2003
- Strongylium khasinamtanoon Masumoto & Akita, 2012
- Strongylium kimanisense Masumoto, 1997
- Strongylium kingdonwardi Masumoto, 1998
- Strongylium klapperichi
- Strongylium kohanemum Masumoto, 1998
- Strongylium kokoae Masumoto & Akita, 2013
- Strongylium kondoi Masumoto & Akita, 2011
- Strongylium krali Masumoto, 2003
- Strongylium kuantouense Masumoto, 2005c
- Strongylium laetum
- Strongylium lanathai Masumoto, 1996
- Strongylium langurioides Champion, 1888
- Strongylium lanhai Masumoto, Akita & Lee, 2013
- Strongylium laocrurale Masumoto & Akita, 2012
- Strongylium laonouaum Masumoto & Akita, 2014
- Strongylium laotaicrurale Masumoto & Akita, 2013
- Strongylium laszlorum Masumoto, 2005c
- Strongylium lautum
- Strongylium liangi Yuan & Ren, 2014
- Strongylium lini Masumoto, Akita & Lee, 2008
- Strongylium lishanum Gebien, 1981
- Strongylium lisuense Masumoto, 1998
- Strongylium longissimum Gebien, 1913
- Strongylium lumulumuense Masumoto, 1998
- Strongylium lutaoense Masumoto, 1992
- Strongylium maculicolle Champion, 1887
- Strongylium maehongsonense Masumoto, 1998
- Strongylium maisi Garrido, 2004
- Strongylium majeri Masumoto, 2003
- Strongylium maleengthai Masumoto, 1996
- Strongylium masatakai Masumoto Lee & Akita, 2007
- Strongylium meengsiikiaum Masumoto & Akita, 2014
- Strongylium meengsiitongum Masumoto & Akita, 2014
- Strongylium meengyoaum Masumoto & Akita, 2014
- Strongylium merkli Masumoto, 1998
- Strongylium miikhonum Masumoto, 1996
- Strongylium mindanaoense Masumoto, 1997
- Strongylium mirabile Linell
- Strongylium misantlae Champion, 1888
- Strongylium miwai Masumoto, 1996
- Strongylium miyakei Masumoto, 1997
- Strongylium montebarreto Garrido, 2004
- Strongylium moritai Masumoto, 1998
- Strongylium moroninum Pic, 1918
- Strongylium mucronatum Mäklin, 1864
- Strongylium naamum Masumoto & Akita, 2011
- Strongylium nakaiense Masumoto & Akita, 2012
- Strongylium nakanei Masumoto, 1981
- Strongylium nakpraati Masumoto, 1996
- Strongylium namnaonis Masumoto, 2003
- Strongylium namthaense Masumoto & Akita, 2012
- Strongylium nanfangum Masumoto, 1982
- Strongylium nangbangense Masumoto, 1998
- Strongylium nanrenense Masumoto, Akita & Lee, 2012
- Strongylium nayoiense Masumoto & Akita, 2011
- Strongylium ngaiense Masumoto & Akita, 2011
- Strongylium nigrum Zayas, 1988
- Strongylium nitidiceps Champion, 1888
- Strongylium nobile Maklin, 1864
- Strongylium noi Masumoto, 1998
- Strongylium norikoae Masumoto & Akita, 2012
- Strongylium ochii Masumoto, 1992
- Strongylium oculatum Champion, 1888
- Strongylium ohbayashiianum Masumoto & Akita, 2014
- Strongylium ohmomoi Masumoto, Akita & Lee, 2013
- Strongylium okajimai Masumoto, 2003
- Strongylium okumurai Masumoto, 1981
- Strongylium opacipenne Champion, 1888
- Strongylium osawai Masumoto, 2005c
- Strongylium ovampoense
- Strongylium pacholatkoi Masumoto, 1998
- Strongylium paddai Ivie & Triplehorn, 1986
- Strongylium pai Masumoto, 1998
- Strongylium pakanense Masumoto & Akita, 2014
- Strongylium pakchongense Masumoto & Akita, 2011
- Strongylium pakseum Masumoto & Akita, 2013
- Strongylium palawanense Masumoto, 1997
- Strongylium palingense Masumoto, 2005c
- Strongylium palopoense Masumoto & Akita, 2011
- Strongylium panamense Champion, 1888
- Strongylium pangkorense Masumoto & Akita, 2011
- Strongylium papuense
- Strongylium perakense Masumoto & Akita, 2011
- Strongylium perturbator
- Strongylium phaknabense Masumoto & Akita, 2011
- Strongylium phedongense Masumoto, 1998
- Strongylium phomae Masumoto, 1996
- Strongylium phonsavanense Masumoto & Akita, 2012
- Strongylium phousamsounense Masumoto & Akita, 2012
- Strongylium phoutonmonense Masumoto & Akita, 2012
- Strongylium phraense Masumoto, 1996
- Strongylium phuchongense Masumoto & Akita, 2011
- Strongylium pici Masumoto, 1998
- Strongylium pilifasciatum Masumoto, 1998
- Strongylium plausible
- Strongylium preciosus Zayas, 1988
- Strongylium pseudogibbosipenne Masumoto, 1981
- Strongylium pumilum Garrido & Armas, 2012
- Strongylium punctipes Champion, 1888
- Strongylium purpureopunctum Pic, 1918
- Strongylium purpuripenne Mäklin, 1864
- Strongylium putaoense Masumoto & Akita, 2011
- Strongylium quisqueyanum Garrido & Armas, 2012
- Strongylium ratchashimaense Masumoto & Akita, 2011
- Strongylium rhodesianum
- Strongylium roifeedaatum Masumoto, 1996
- Strongylium roiyonum Masumoto, 1996
- Strongylium rufabdominale Masumoto, 1998
- Strongylium rufifemoratum Masumoto, 1997
- Strongylium rufovittatum Pic, 1932
- Strongylium sabahense Masumoto, 1997
- Strongylium sabahinsigne Masumoto, 1997
- Strongylium sakaii Masumoto, 1998
- Strongylium salueiense Masumoto & Akita, 2013
- Strongylium salvazai Masumoto & Akita, 2011
- Strongylium saracenum (Reiche & Saulcy, 1857)
- Strongylium sawaiae Masumoto, 1996
- Strongylium schawalleri Masumoto, 2003
- Strongylium scheknlingi Gebien, 1913
- Strongylium schneideri Masumoto, 1998
- Strongylium semiopacum Pic, 1918
- Strongylium shigeoi Masumoto, Akita & Lee, 2008
- Strongylium shimomurai Masumoto, 1998
- Strongylium siichaum Masumoto & Akita, 2014
- Strongylium siidemum Masumoto, 1996
- Strongylium siidum Masumoto, 1998
- Strongylium siisuai Masumoto, 1996
- Strongylium simplicicolle LeConte, 1878
- Strongylium simplicipes Pic, 1918
- Strongylium sinuatipenne Miwa, 1939
- Strongylium siphangngense Masumoto, 2003
- Strongylium snizeki Masumoto & Akita, 2011
- Strongylium sodongense Masumoto & Akita, 2011
- Strongylium soncai Masumoto, 1996
- Strongylium soppongense Masumoto, 1998
- Strongylium sparseimpressum Pic, 1922
- Strongylium spec Masumoto & Akita, 2011
- Strongylium strbahergovisorum Masumoto & Akita, 2012
- Strongylium subalternatum Pic, 1918
- Strongylium sulawesiense Masumoto, 1997
- Strongylium sumikoae Masumoto, Akita & Lee, 2014
- Strongylium suspicax
- Strongylium szentivanyi Kaszab, 1941
- Strongylium tabanai Masumoto, 1998
- Strongylium takeshianum Masumoto & Akita, 2011
- Strongylium tanikadoi Masumoto, 1998
- Strongylium taoi Masumoto, 1996
- Strongylium tehuashense Masumoto, 2005c
- Strongylium tenuicolle (Say)
- Strongylium terminatum (Say)
- Strongylium thangonense Masumoto & Akita, 2014
- Strongylium tinctipes Champion, 1887
- Strongylium trifasciatum Masumoto, 1998
- Strongylium tsurui Masumoto, 2003
- Strongylium tsuyukii Masumoto, 1996
- Strongylium turquinense Zayas, 1988
- Strongylium umphangense Masumoto, 2003
- Strongylium variicorne Champion, 1887
- Strongylium ventrale Champion, 1888
- Strongylium venustum Zayas, 1988
- Strongylium verde Garrido & Armas, 2012
- Strongylium vikenae Ferrer
- Strongylium virescens Zayas, 1988
- Strongylium viride Fabricius, 1801
- Strongylium viridimembris Pic, 1922
- Strongylium viriditinctum Champion, 1888
- Strongylium wadai Masumoto, 2005c
- Strongylium wallacei Masumoto, 1997
- Strongylium wiseetingum Masumoto, 1997
- Strongylium woodruffi Garrido & Armas, 2012
- Strongylium xiengkouangense Masumoto & Akita, 2013
- Strongylium yai Masumoto, 1998
- Strongylium yalaense Masumoto & Akita, 2011
- Strongylium yamasakoi Masumoto & Akita, 2013
- Strongylium yasuhikoi Masumoto, 1996
- Strongylium yokoyamai Masumoto, 1981
- Strongylium yukae Masumoto, 1996
- Strongylium zoltani Masumoto, 1981
