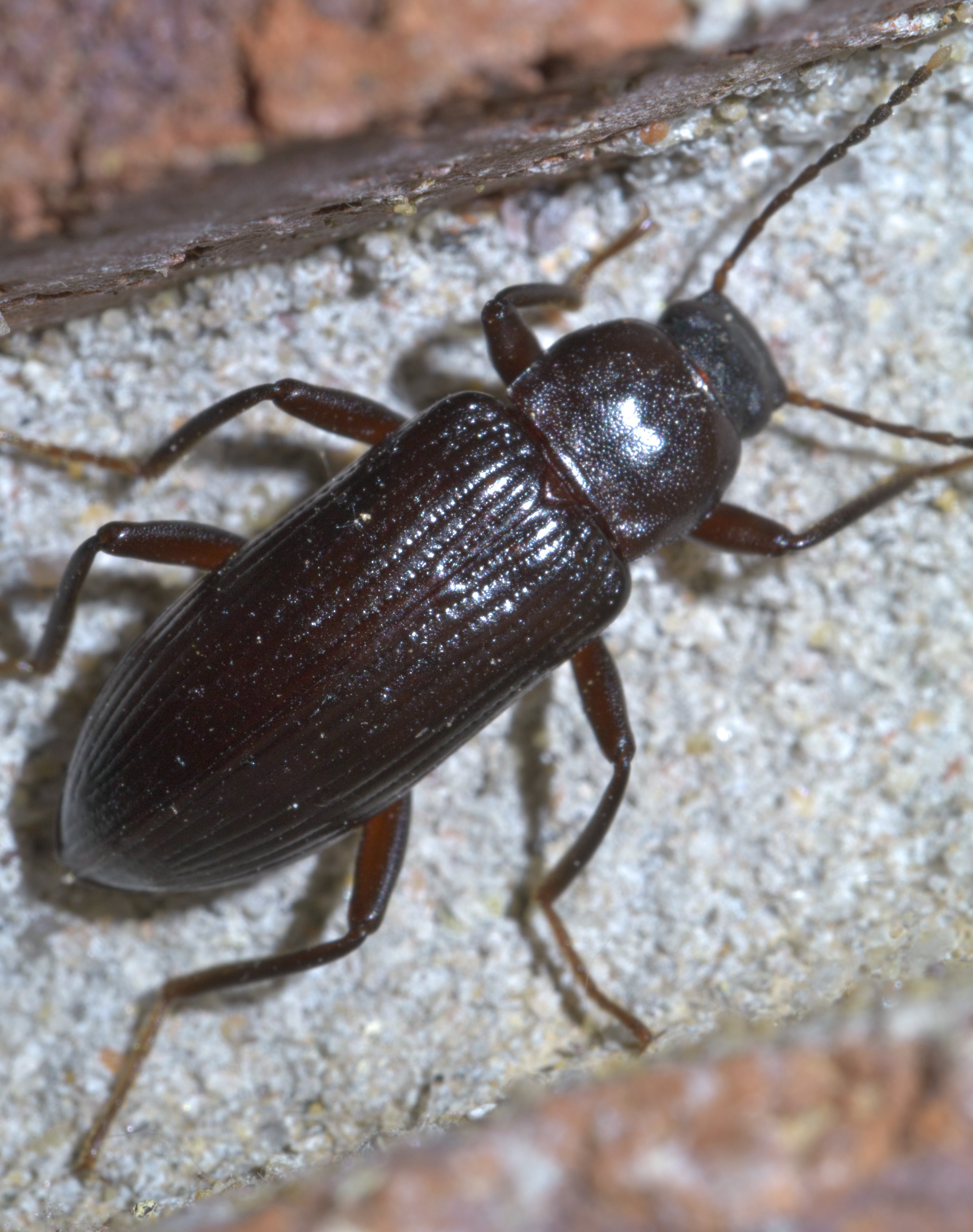
- Strongylium terminatum

Scientific classification
- Kingdom: Animalia
- Phylum: Arthropoda
- Clade: Pancrustacea
- Class: Insecta
- Order: Coleoptera
- Suborder: Polyphaga
- Infraorder: Cucujiformia
- Family: Tenebrionidae
- Subfamily: Stenochiinae
- Tribe: Stenochiini
- Genus: Strongylium; Ditmar, 1809

Diversity
- more than 700 species

= Strongylium =

Genus of beetles

Strongylium is a genus of darkling beetles in the family Tenebrionidae. It is one of the largest genera in both the family and its subfamily, Stenochiinae, with more than 1,400 known species. These beetles are widely distributed in the tropics and subtropics of the Old and New World. More than 300 species are native to the Neotropics.

== Gallery ==
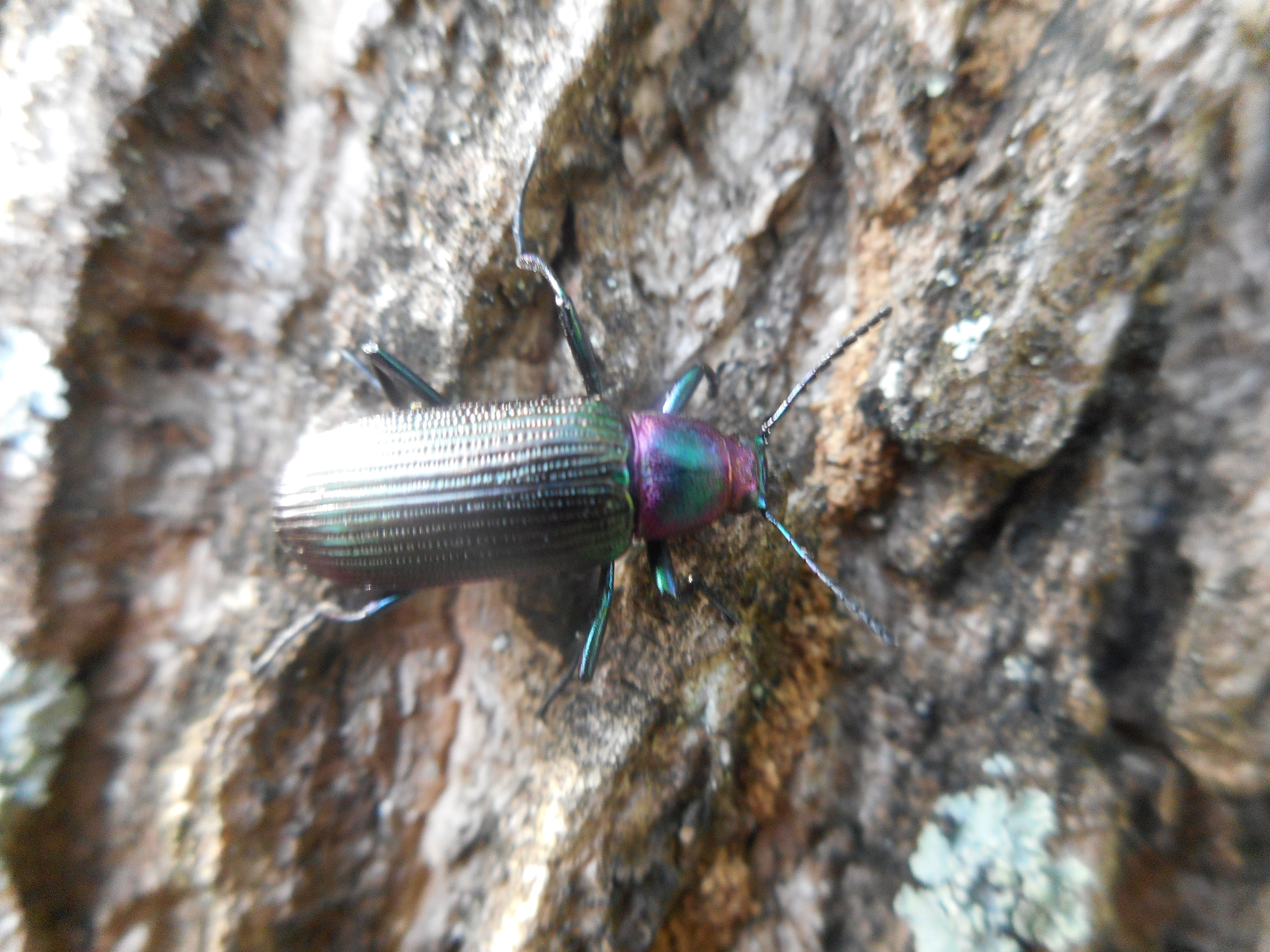
Strongylium auratum

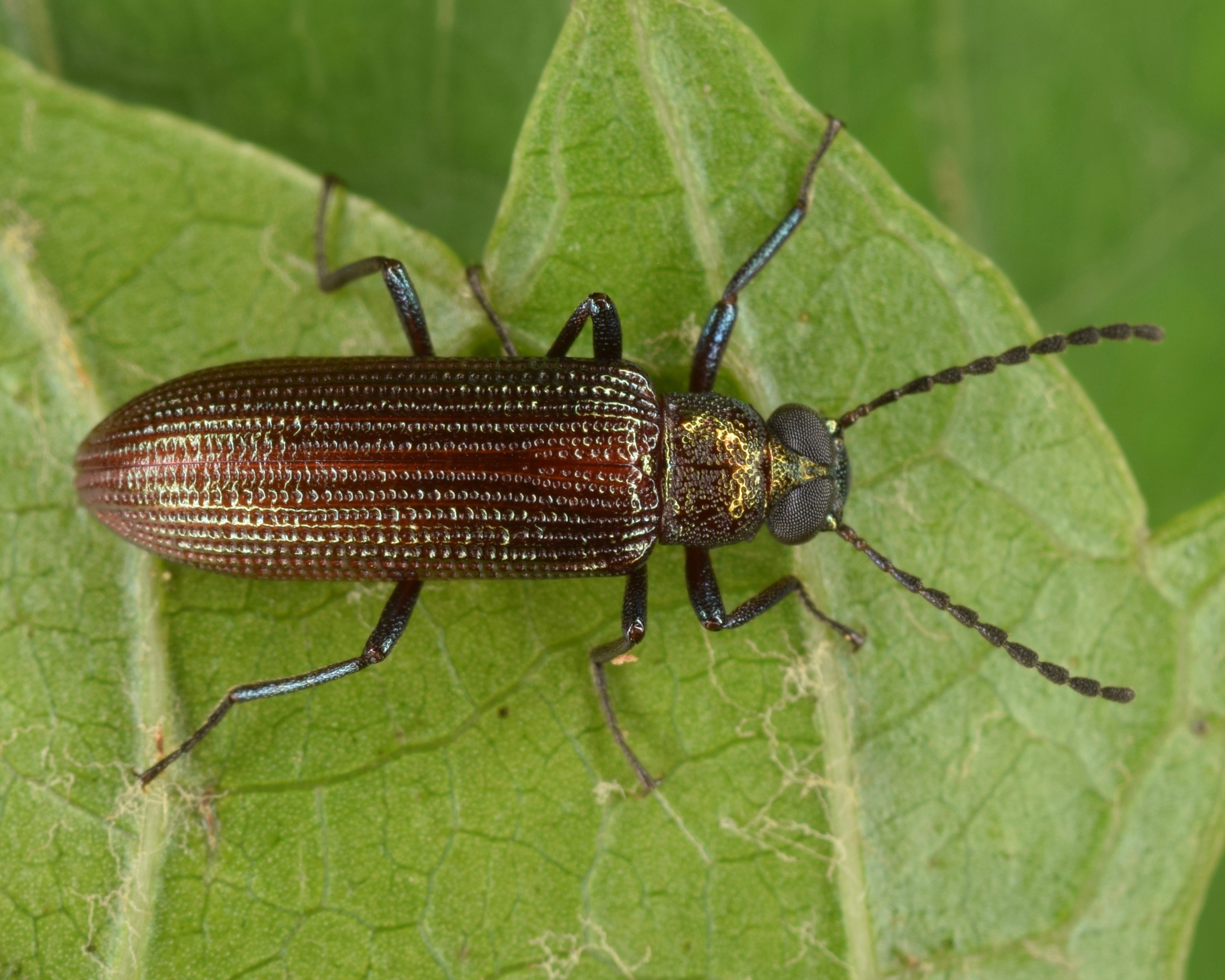
Strongylium crenatum

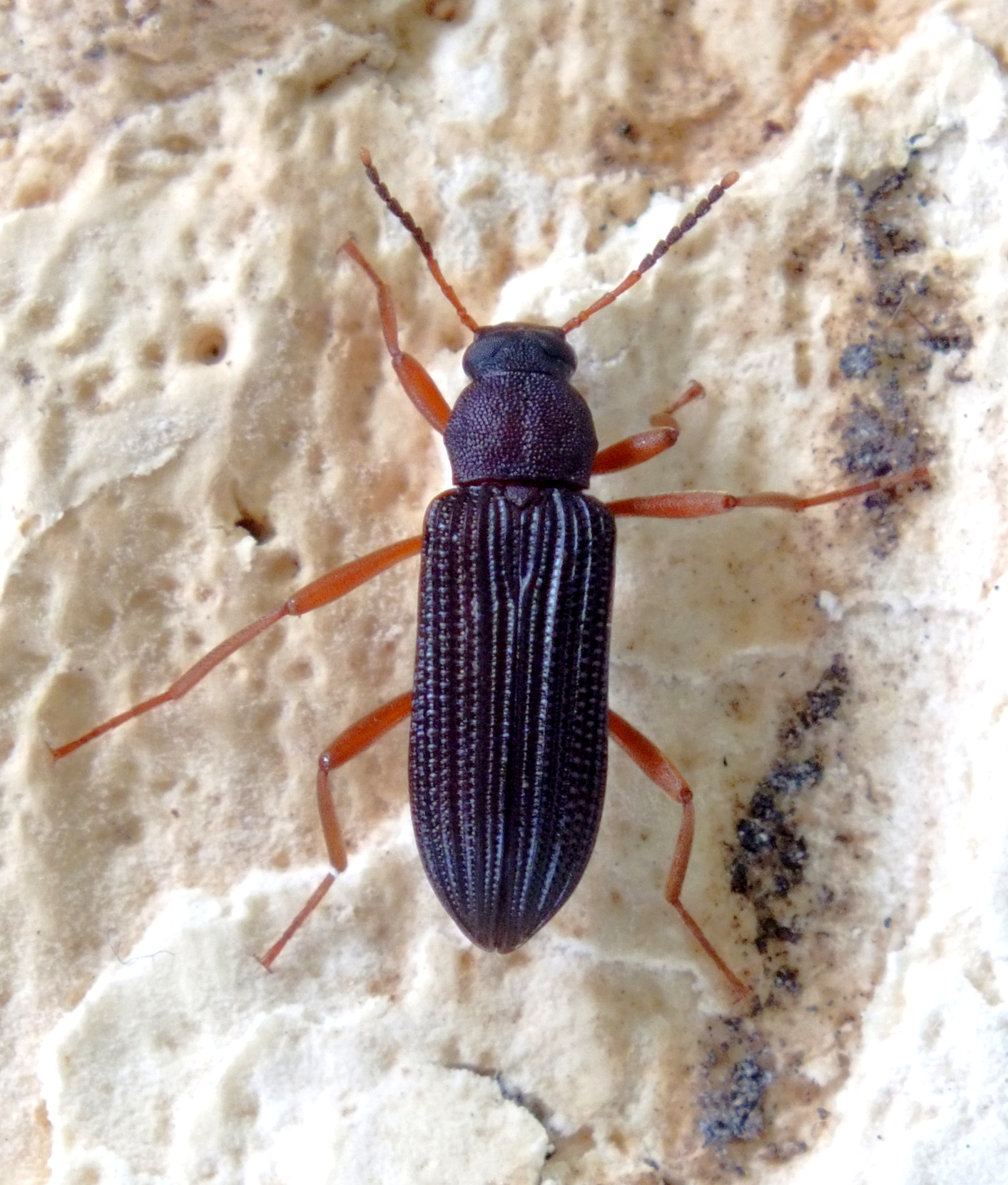
Strongylium cultellatum

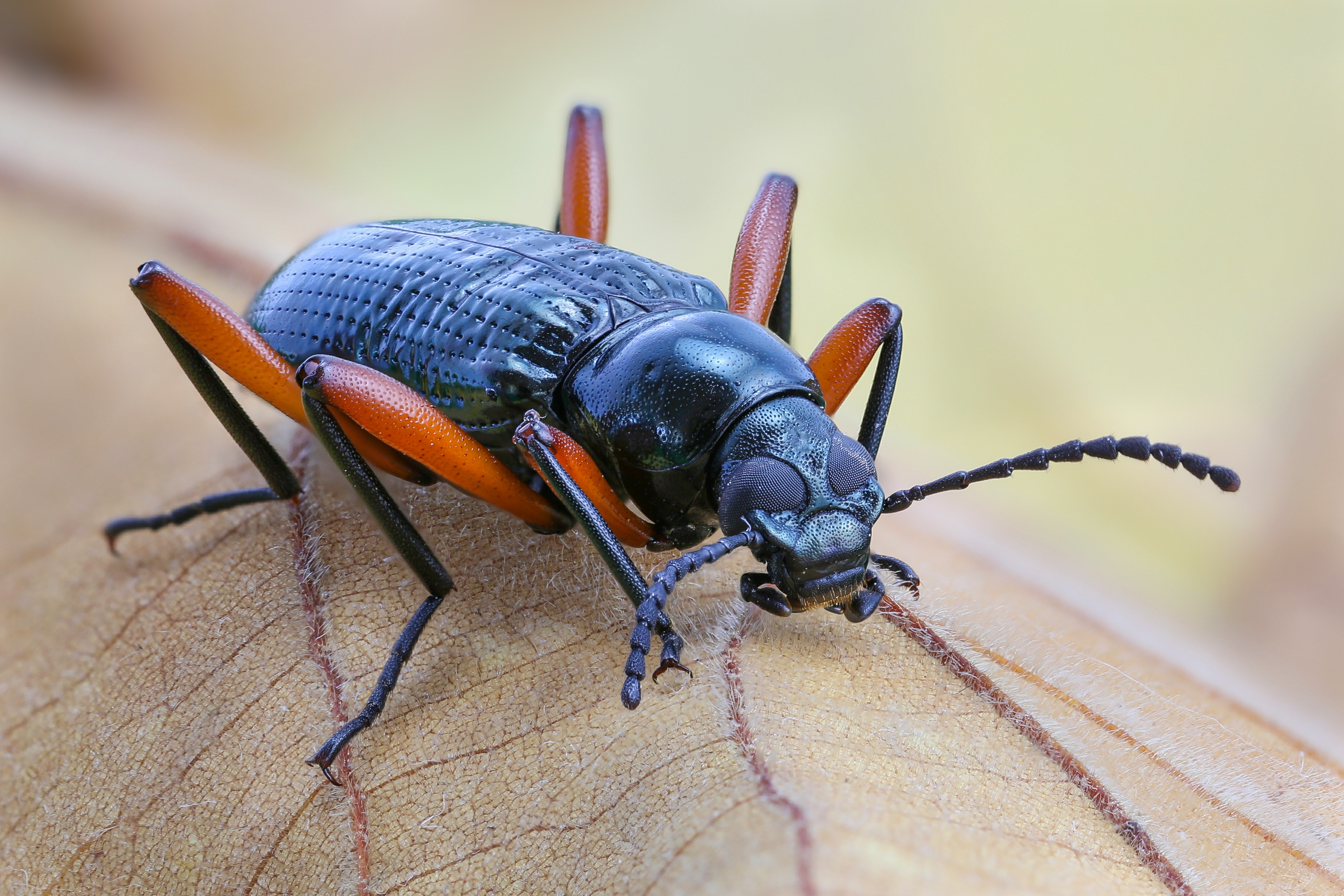
Strongylium cf. erythrocephalum

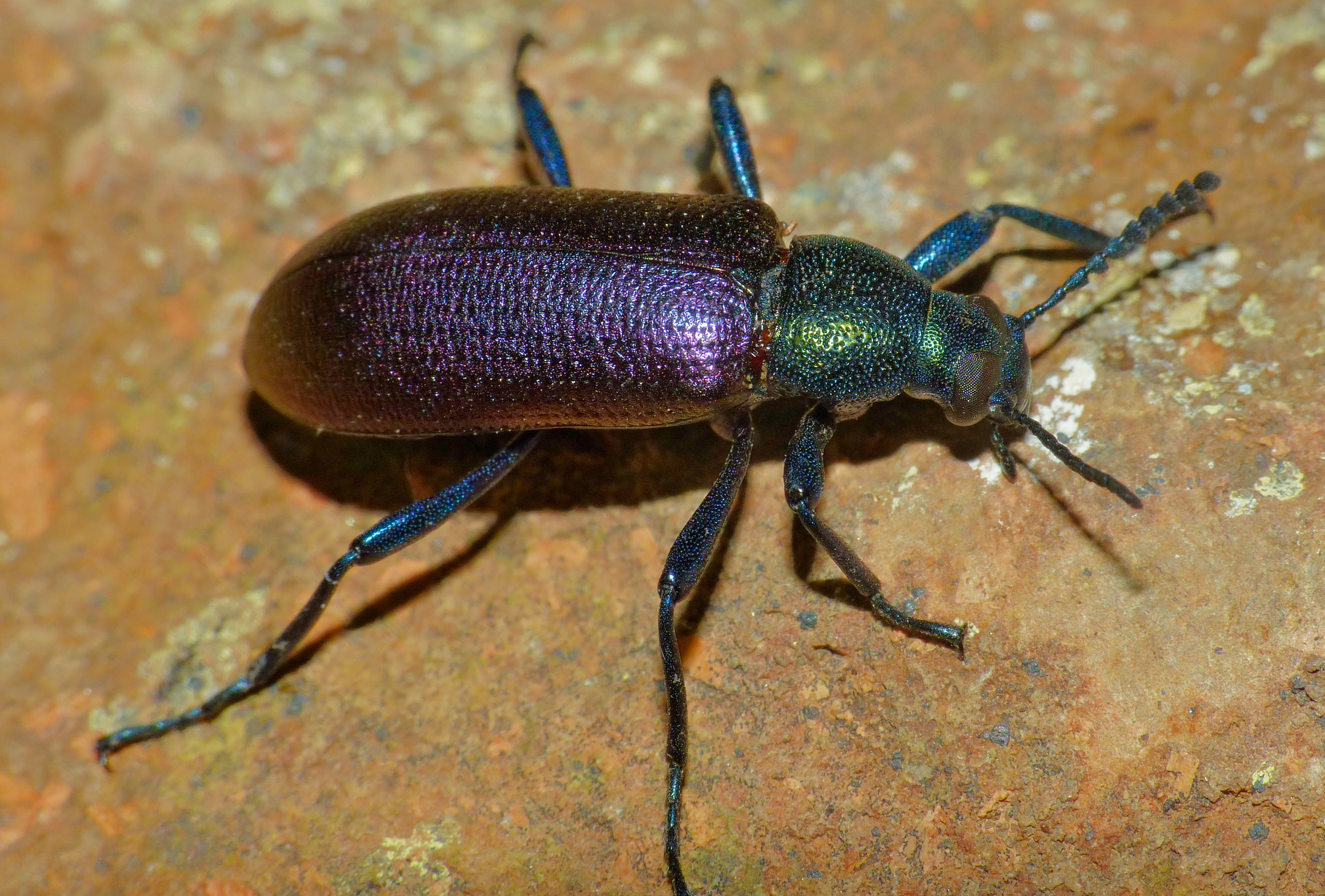
Strongylium purpuripenne

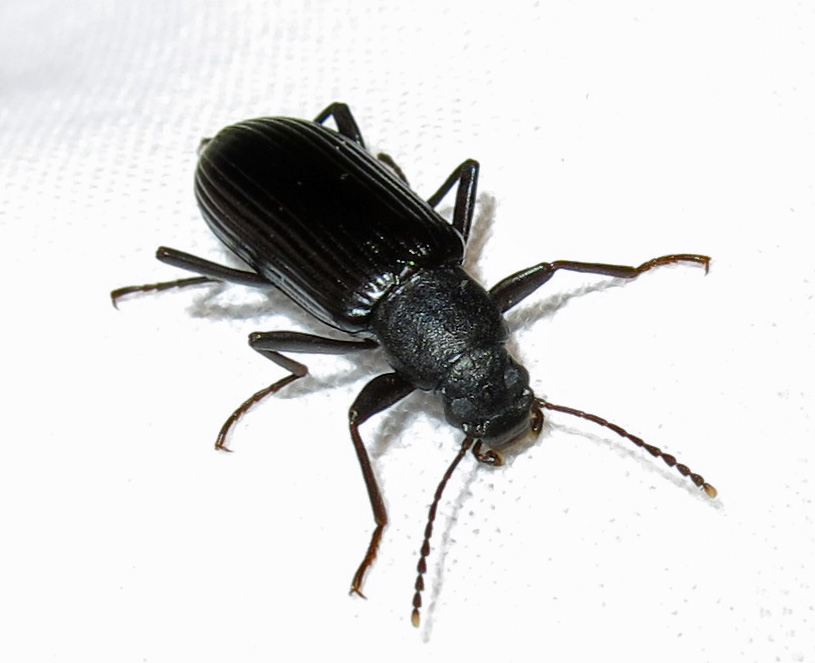
Strongylium tenuicolle

== See also ==
- List of Strongylium species
