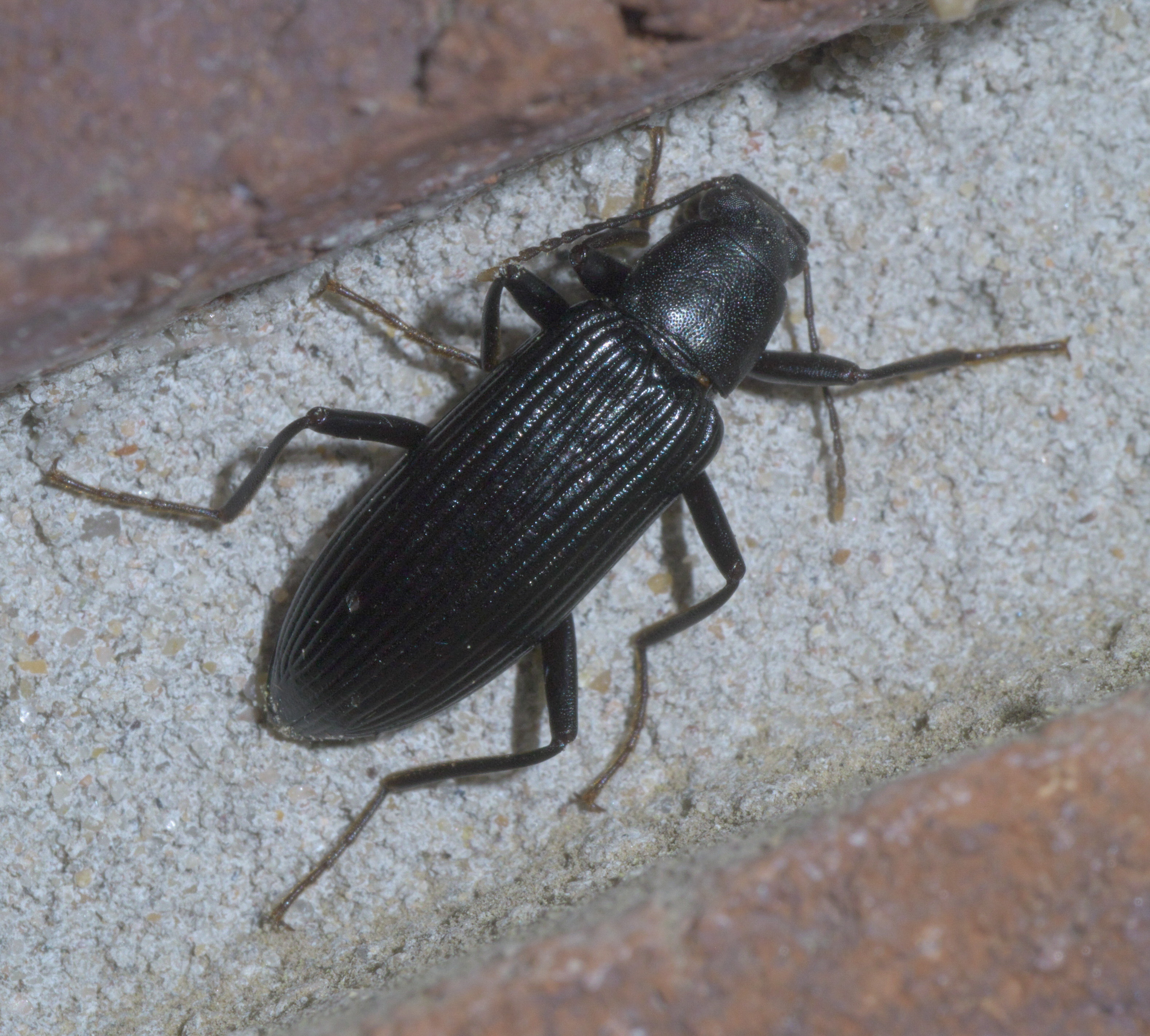

Scientific classification
- Kingdom: Animalia
- Phylum: Arthropoda
- Class: Insecta
- Order: Coleoptera
- Suborder: Polyphaga
- Infraorder: Cucujiformia
- Family: Tenebrionidae
- Genus: Strongylium
- Species: S. tenuicolle

Binomial name
- Strongylium tenuicolle (Say)

= Strongylium tenuicolle =

Species of beetle

Strongylium tenuicolle is a species of darkling beetle in the family Tenebrionidae.
