= Rhizolitha =

Scientific classification
- Kingdom: Animalia
- Phylum: Arthropoda
- Clade: Pancrustacea
- Class: Insecta
- Order: Lepidoptera
- Superfamily: Noctuoidea
- Family: Noctuidae
- Subfamily: Cuculliinae
- Genus: Rhizolitha; Curtis, 1830

Junior synonym of the moth genus Lithophane (Noctuidae)

Rhizolitha is a junior synonym of the moth genus Lithophane Hübner, 1821, in the family Noctuidae. It was described by the English entomologist John Curtis in 1830, in his work A Guide to an Arrangement of British Insects (fascicle 5, p. 149), with the type species Noctua rhizolitha ([Denis & Schiffermüller], 1775), now treated as a synonym of Lithophane ornitopus (Hufnagel, 1766), the grey shoulder-knot moth.

Because Lithophane Hübner, 1821 was described nine years earlier than Rhizolitha Curtis, 1830, the name Lithophane has nomenclatural priority under the International Code of Zoological Nomenclature (ICZN), and Rhizolitha is therefore its objective junior synonym.

== Taxonomy ==
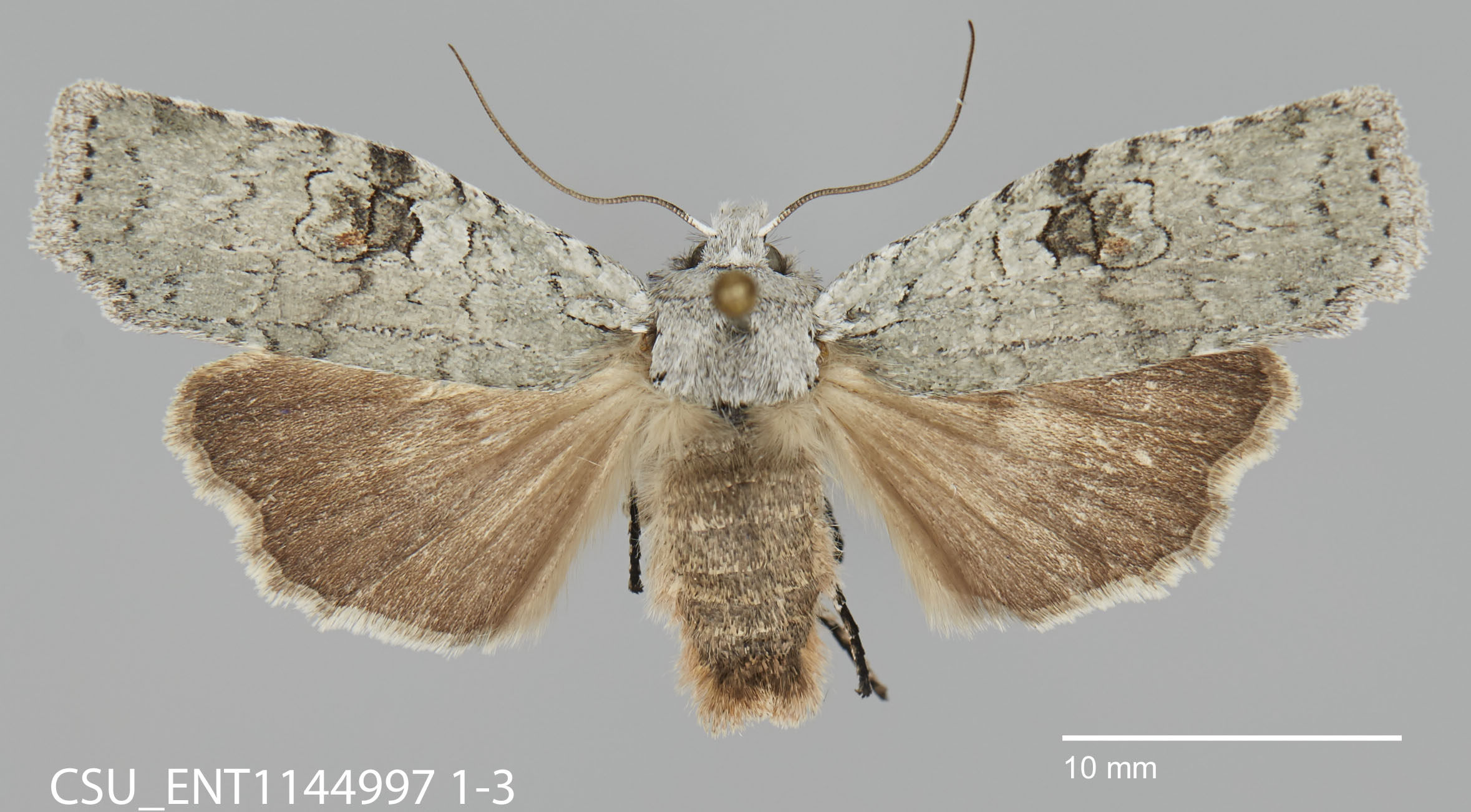
Lithophane viridipallens, a North American member of the genus Lithophane, the valid name under which species formerly placed in Rhizolitha are now classified.

Rhizolitha was placed by Curtis (1830) based on a single species, Noctua rhizolitha ([Denis & Schiffermüller], 1775), now accepted as a synonym of Lithophane ornitopus (Hufnagel, 1766) — the grey shoulder-knot. Robert Poole's 1989 world catalogue of Noctuidae (the standard reference for the family) treated Rhizolitha as a synonym of Lithophane, a placement followed by all subsequent major catalogues.

The genus Lithophane (sensu lato, including Rhizolitha) contains well over 100 species distributed across the Holarctic region, with the majority in the Nearctic (North America). They are commonly called pinion moths and are notable for overwintering as adults, a trait rare among Noctuidae.

=== Selected species (previously placed in Rhizolitha) ===
The following North American species were historically associated with Rhizolitha and are now placed in Lithophane:

- Lithophane semiusta (Grote, 1874)
- Lithophane patefacta (Walker, 1858)
- Lithophane bethunei (Grote & Robinson, 1868)
- Lithophane fagina (Morrison, 1875)
- Lithophane disposita (Morrison, 1875)
- Lithophane querquera (Grote, 1874)
