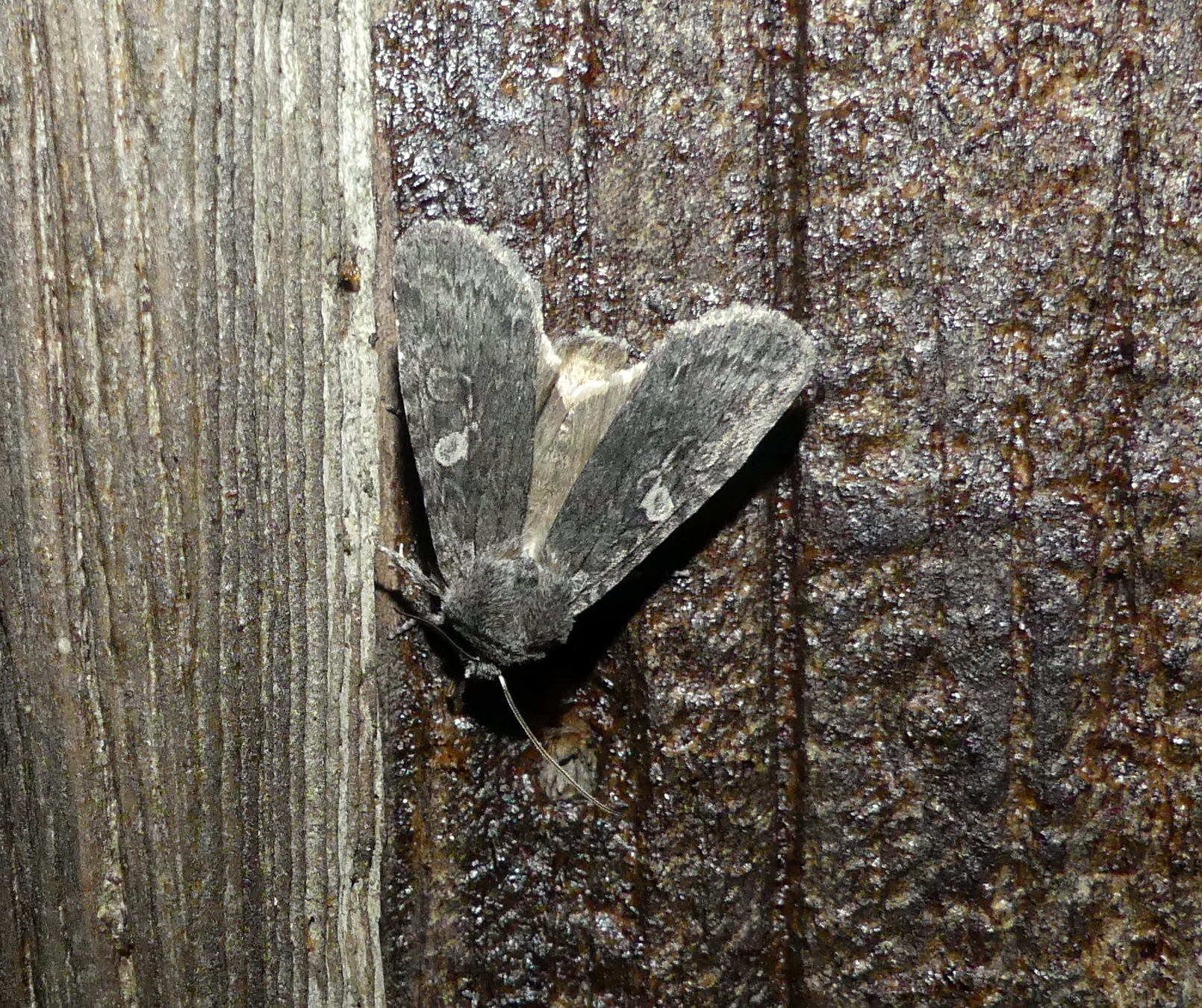

Scientific classification
- Kingdom: Animalia
- Phylum: Arthropoda
- Clade: Pancrustacea
- Class: Insecta
- Order: Lepidoptera
- Superfamily: Noctuoidea
- Family: Noctuidae
- Tribe: Xylenini
- Subtribe: Xylenina
- Genus: Lithophane
- Species: L. unimoda

Binomial name
- Lithophane unimoda (Lintner, 1878)

= Lithophane unimoda =

Species of moth

Lithophane unimoda, the dowdy pinion, is a species of cutworm or dart moth in the family Noctuidae. It is found in North America.
