= Lithophane franclemonti =

Scientific classification
- Domain: Eukaryota
- Kingdom: Animalia
- Phylum: Arthropoda
- Class: Insecta
- Order: Lepidoptera
- Superfamily: Noctuoidea
- Family: Noctuidae
- Tribe: Xylenini
- Subtribe: Xylenina
- Genus: Lithophane
- Species: L. franclemonti

Binomial name
- Lithophane franclemonti Metzler, 1998

Species of moth

Lithophane franclemonti, known generally as Franclemont's Pinion, is a species of cutworm or dart moth in the family Noctuidae. The species is found in North America.

The MONA or Hodges number for Lithophane franclemonti is 9888.1.
