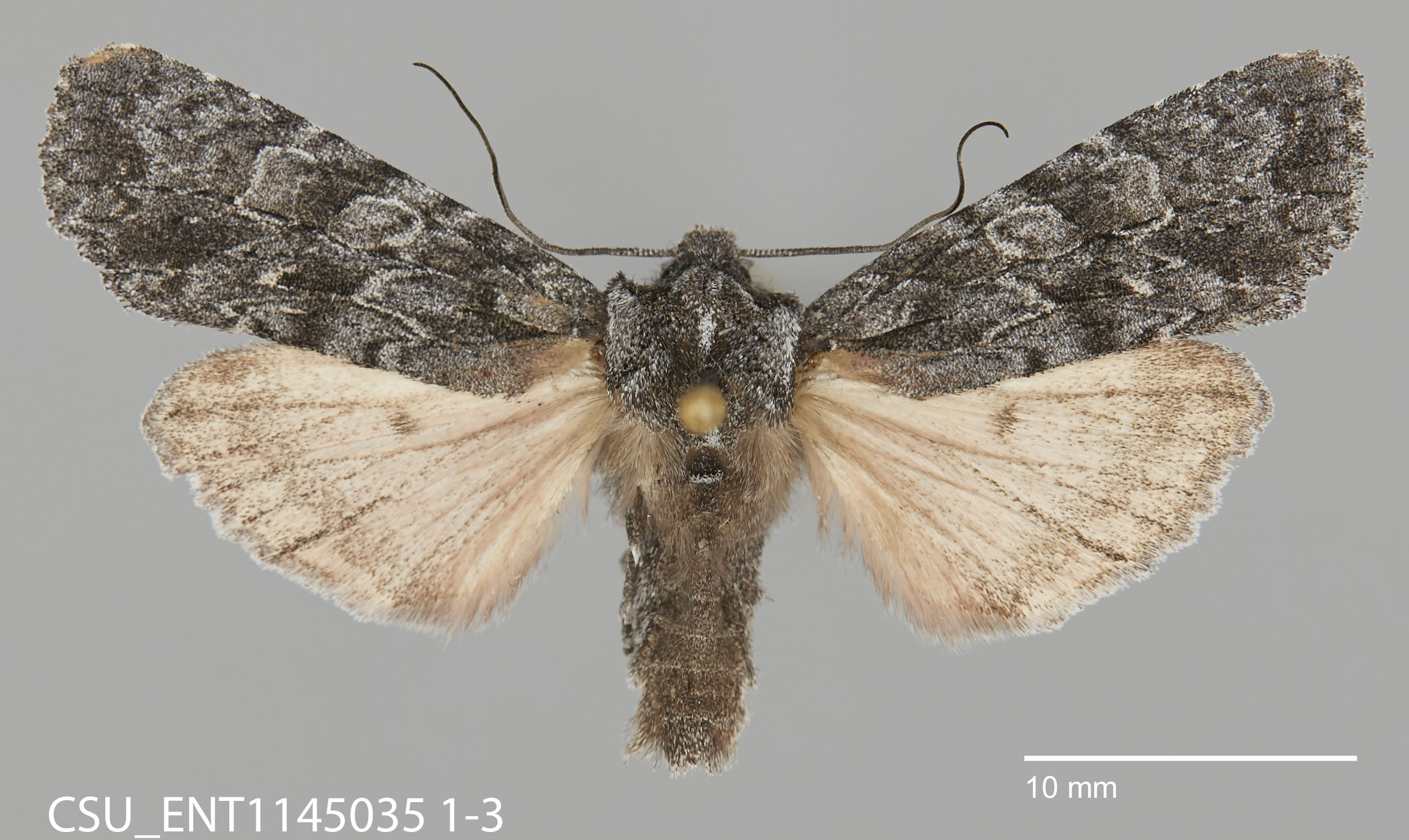

Scientific classification
- Domain: Eukaryota
- Kingdom: Animalia
- Phylum: Arthropoda
- Class: Insecta
- Order: Lepidoptera
- Superfamily: Noctuoidea
- Family: Noctuidae
- Tribe: Xylenini
- Subtribe: Xylenina
- Genus: Lithophane
- Species: L. ponderosa

Binomial name
- Lithophane ponderosa Troubridge & Lafontaine, 2003

= Lithophane ponderosa =

Species of moth

Lithophane ponderosa is a species of cutworm or dart moth in the family Noctuidae. It is found in North America.

The MONA or Hodges number for Lithophane ponderosa is 9924.1.
