= Lithophane amanda =

Scientific classification
- Domain: Eukaryota
- Kingdom: Animalia
- Phylum: Arthropoda
- Class: Insecta
- Order: Lepidoptera
- Superfamily: Noctuoidea
- Family: Noctuidae
- Tribe: Xylenini
- Subtribe: Xylenina
- Genus: Lithophane
- Species: L. amanda

Binomial name
- Lithophane amanda (Smith, 1900)

Species of moth

Lithophane amanda, or Amanda's pinion, is a species of cutworm or dart moth in the family Noctuidae. It is found in North America.

The MONA or Hodges number for Lithophane amanda is 9891.
