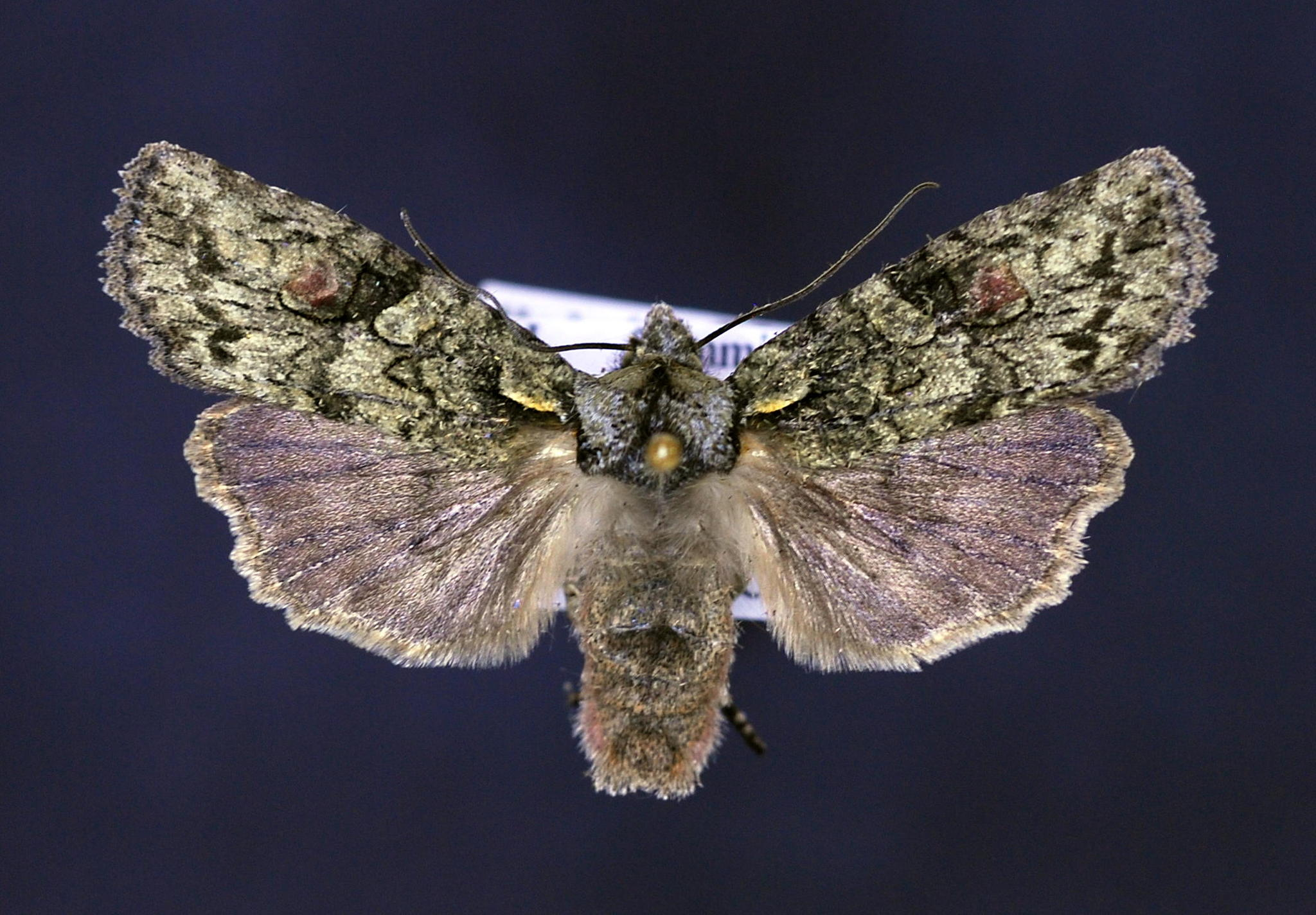

Scientific classification
- Domain: Eukaryota
- Kingdom: Animalia
- Phylum: Arthropoda
- Class: Insecta
- Order: Lepidoptera
- Superfamily: Noctuoidea
- Family: Noctuidae
- Tribe: Xylenini
- Subtribe: Xylenina
- Genus: Lithophane
- Species: L. scottae

Binomial name
- Lithophane scottae Troubridge, 2006

= Lithophane scottae =

Species of moth

Lithophane scottae, the fireweed groundsel, is a species of cutworm or dart moth in the family Noctuidae. It is found in North America.

The MONA or Hodges number for Lithophane scottae is 9904.1.
