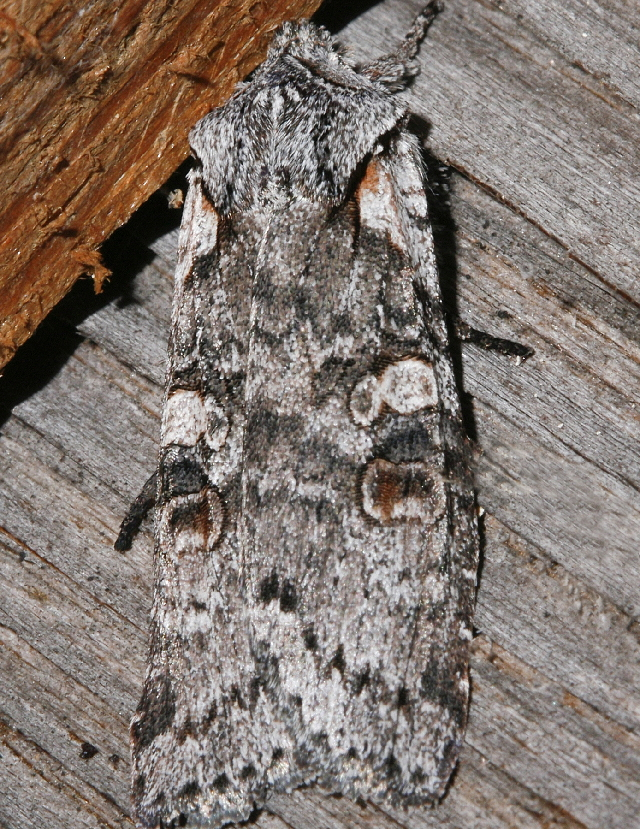

Scientific classification
- Kingdom: Animalia
- Phylum: Arthropoda
- Clade: Pancrustacea
- Class: Insecta
- Order: Lepidoptera
- Superfamily: Noctuoidea
- Family: Noctuidae
- Tribe: Xylenini
- Subtribe: Xylenina
- Genus: Lithophane
- Species: L. pertorrida

Binomial name
- Lithophane pertorrida (McDunnough, 1942)

= Lithophane pertorrida =

Species of moth

Lithophane pertorrida is a species of cutworm or dart moth in the family Noctuidae. It is found in North America.
