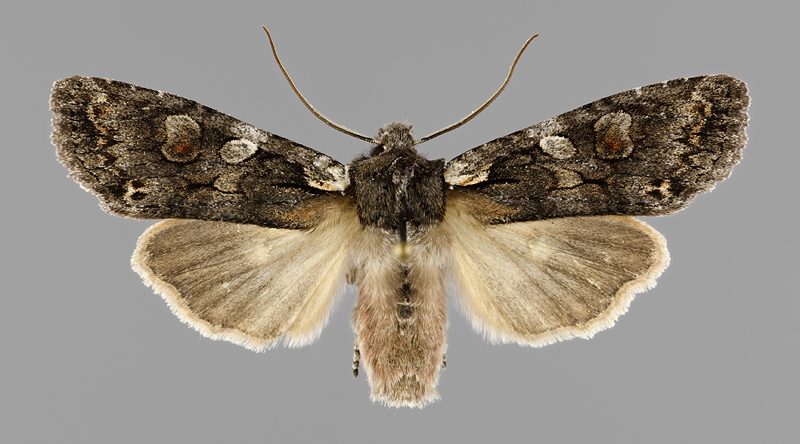
- Male
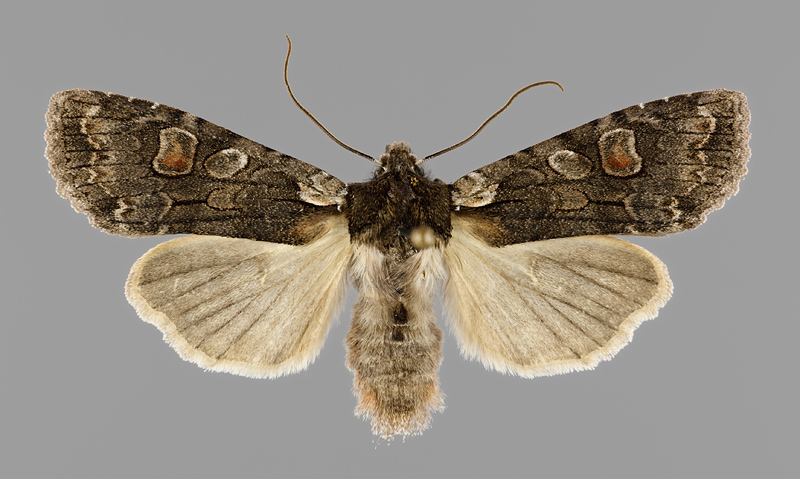
- Female

Scientific classification
- Kingdom: Animalia
- Phylum: Arthropoda
- Class: Insecta
- Order: Lepidoptera
- Superfamily: Noctuoidea
- Family: Noctuidae
- Genus: Lithophane
- Species: L. consocia

Binomial name
- Lithophane consocia (Borkhausen, 1792)

Synonyms
- Phalaena (Noctua) consocia Borkhausen, 1792; Xylina ingrica Herrich-Schäffer, [1850]; Xylina cinerosa Guenée, 1852; Xylina ingrica var. grisea Graeser, 1889; Agriopis jezoensis Matsumura, 1931

= Lithophane consocia =

Species of moth

Lithophane consocia, the scarce conformist or Softly's shoulder-knot, is a moth of the family Noctuidae. The species was first described by Moritz Balthasar Borkhausen in 1792. It is found throughout northern, central and eastern Europe, east to Siberia. There is a single record from Great Britain, where it was recorded in Hampstead, London, in September 2001.

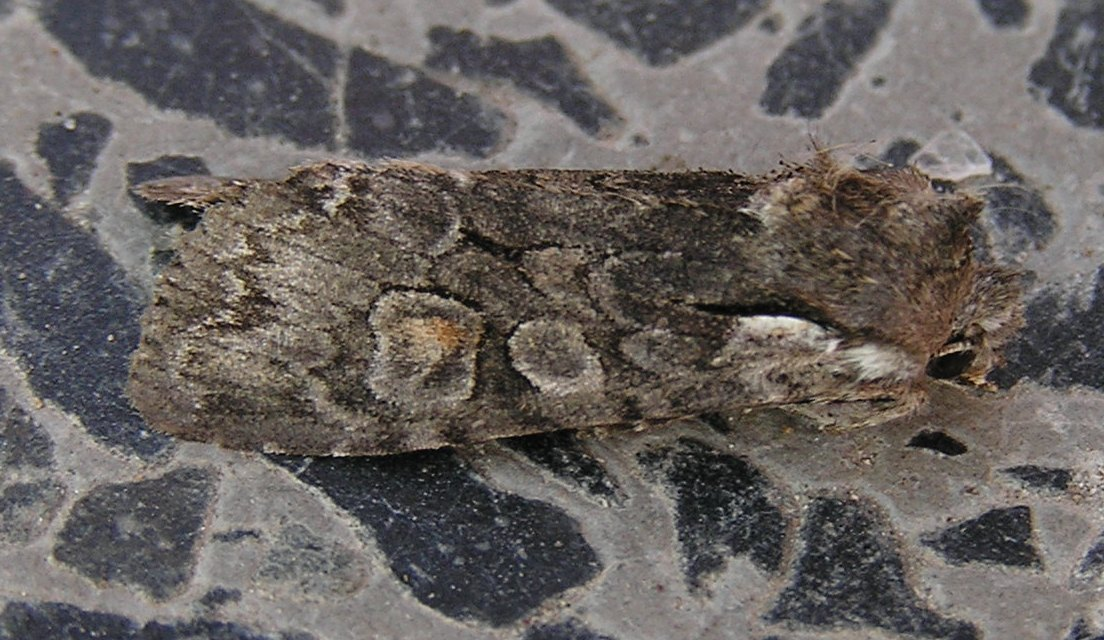

The wingspan is 43–48 mm. Seitz describes it - L. ingrica H.-Sch. (= conformis Frr. nec Hbn., cinerosa Guen.). Forewing silvery grey, more or less overlaid with purplish brown; the pale patch at base of costa, and the pale rings of the stigmata distinguish it at once from furcifera; all the markings, both lines and stigmata, are more conspicuous: grisea Graes. (= obscura Carad.) is a dark form from Amurland; basidiluta Strand from Norway and St. Petersburg has the whole basal area paler. Larva grey brown with velvety black interrupted dorsal, subdorsal, and spiracular lines, mixed with yellow and red. Adults are on wing from September and overwintering until May.

The larvae feed on Alnus and Corylus.

== Subspecies ==
- Lithophane consocia consocia (Europe)
- Lithophane consocia grisea (south-eastern Siberia)
