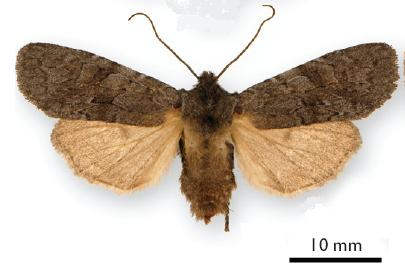

Scientific classification
- Domain: Eukaryota
- Kingdom: Animalia
- Phylum: Arthropoda
- Class: Insecta
- Order: Lepidoptera
- Superfamily: Noctuoidea
- Family: Noctuidae
- Genus: Lithophane
- Species: L. adipel

Binomial name
- Lithophane adipel Benjamin, 1936

= Lithophane adipel =

Species of moth

Lithophane adipel is a moth of the family Noctuidae first described by Foster Hendrickson Benjamin in 1936. The wingspan is about 42 mm.
