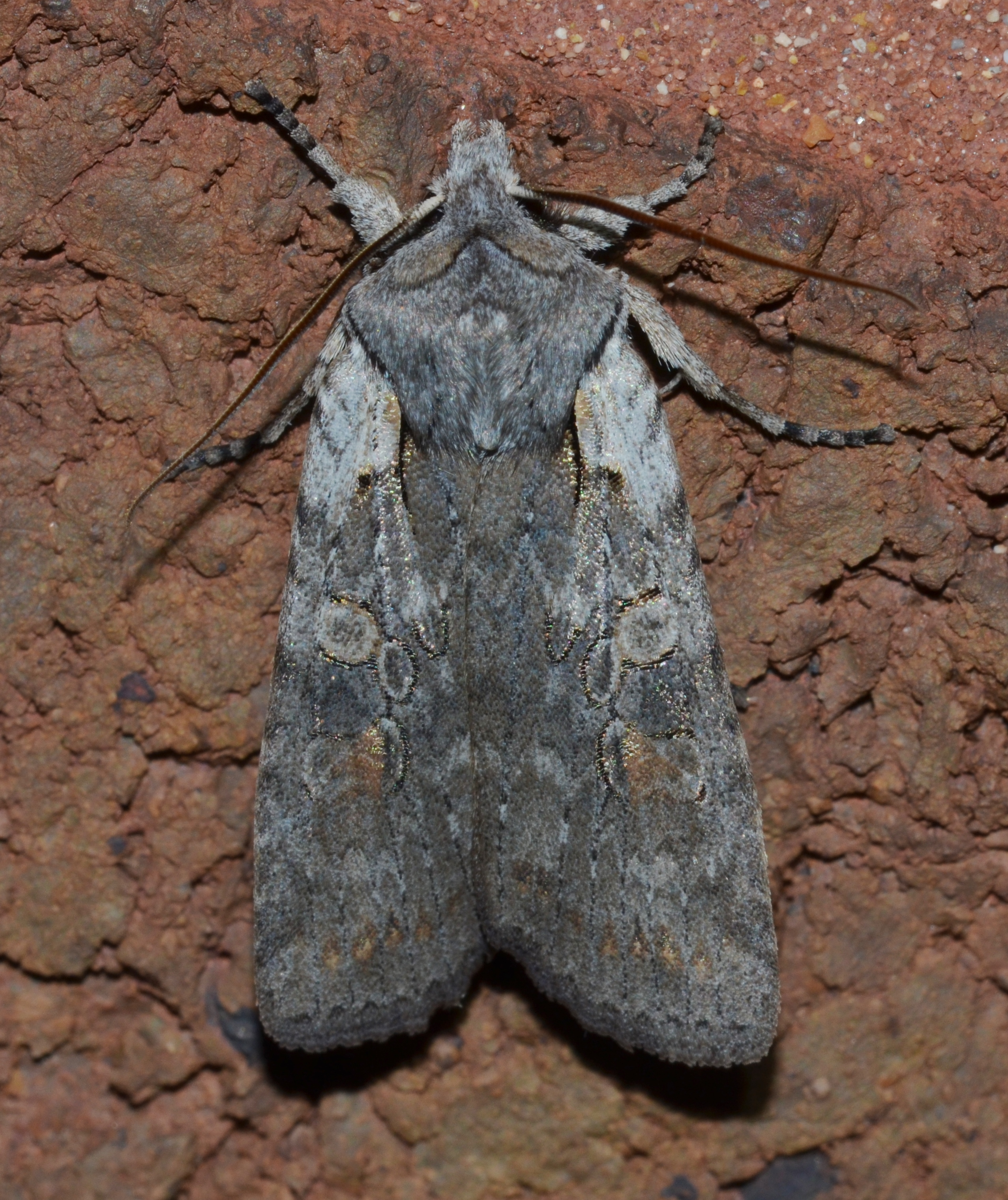

Scientific classification
- Kingdom: Animalia
- Phylum: Arthropoda
- Class: Insecta
- Order: Lepidoptera
- Superfamily: Noctuoidea
- Family: Noctuidae
- Genus: Lithophane
- Species: L. antennata

Binomial name
- Lithophane antennata (Walker, 1858)

= Lithophane antennata =

Species of moth

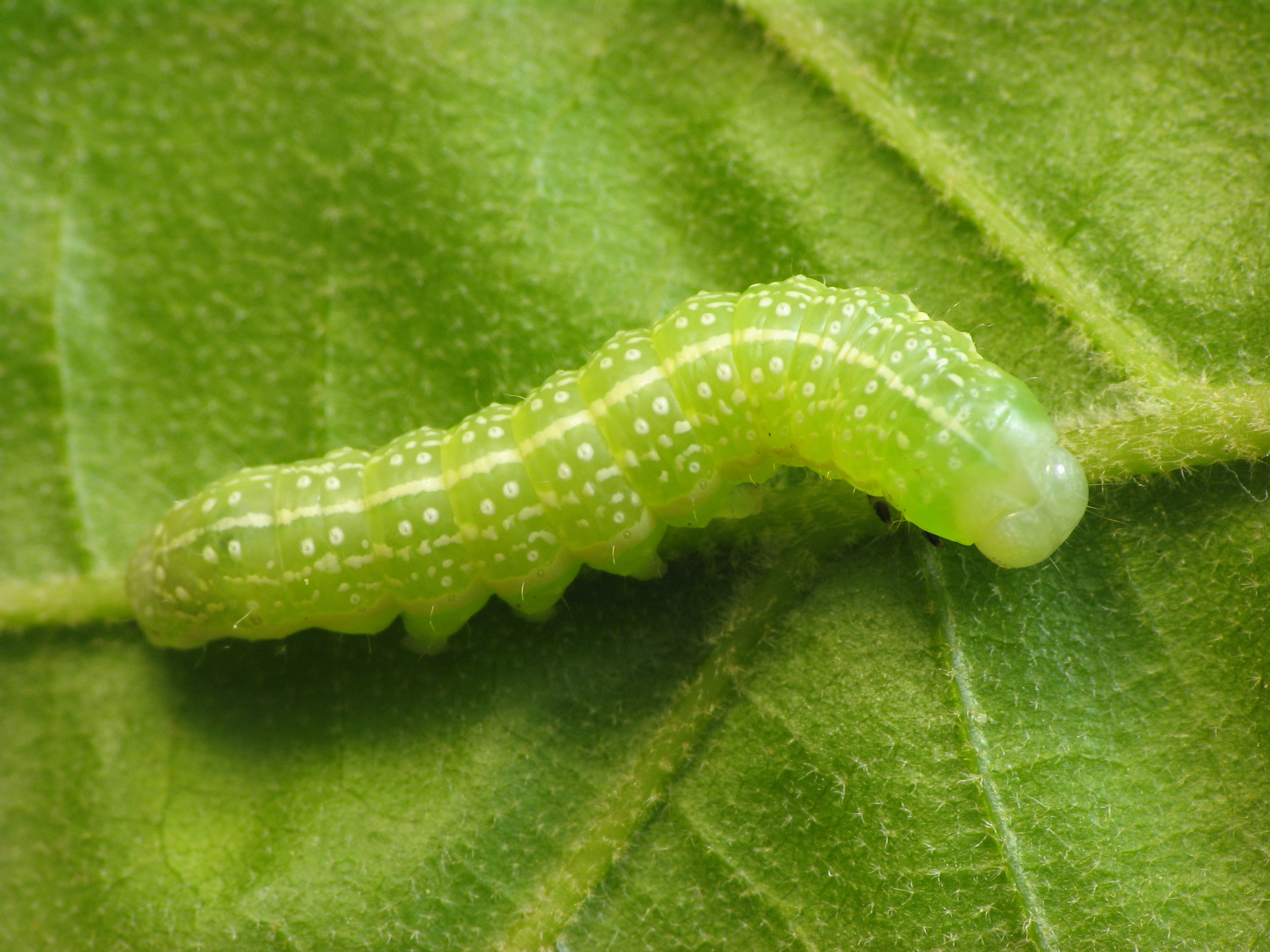
Caterpillar on oak leaf

Lithophane antennata, known generally as the ashen pinion or green fruitworm, is a species of cutworm or dart moth in the family Noctuidae. It is found in North America.

The MONA or Hodges number for Lithophane antennata is 9910.
