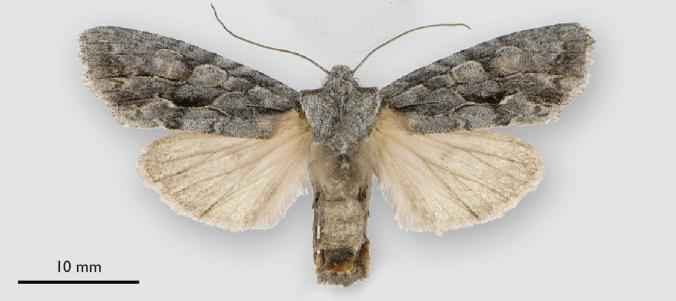

Scientific classification
- Domain: Eukaryota
- Kingdom: Animalia
- Phylum: Arthropoda
- Class: Insecta
- Order: Lepidoptera
- Superfamily: Noctuoidea
- Family: Noctuidae
- Genus: Lithophane
- Species: L. atara

Binomial name
- Lithophane atara J.B. Smith, 1909

= Lithophane atara =

Species of moth

Lithophane atara is a moth of the family Noctuidae. It is found in British Columbia, Manitoba and western Ontario.

The length of the forewings is about 18–20 mm. Adults are on wing from August to September.

The larvae feed on lodgepole pine and ponderosa pine.
