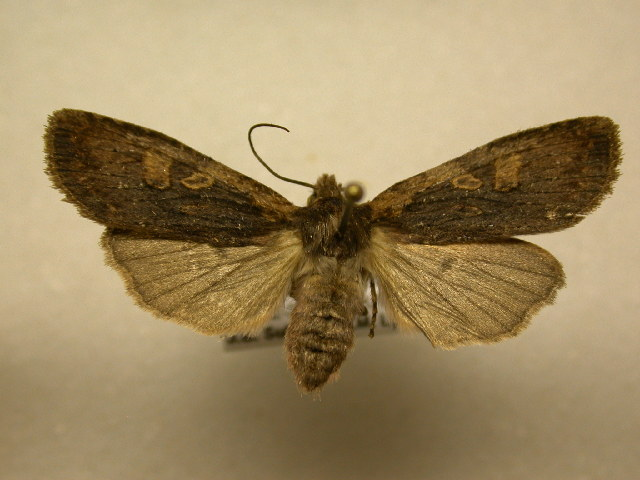

Scientific classification
- Kingdom: Animalia
- Phylum: Arthropoda
- Clade: Pancrustacea
- Class: Insecta
- Order: Lepidoptera
- Superfamily: Noctuoidea
- Family: Noctuidae
- Genus: Lithophane
- Species: L. joannis

Binomial name
- Lithophane joannis Covell & Metzler 1992

= Lithophane joannis =

Species of moth

Lithophane joannis is a moth of the family Noctuidae. It is found in the US states of Ohio, Kentucky and Michigan.

The length of the forewings is 15–17 mm. The moth flies from October to April.
