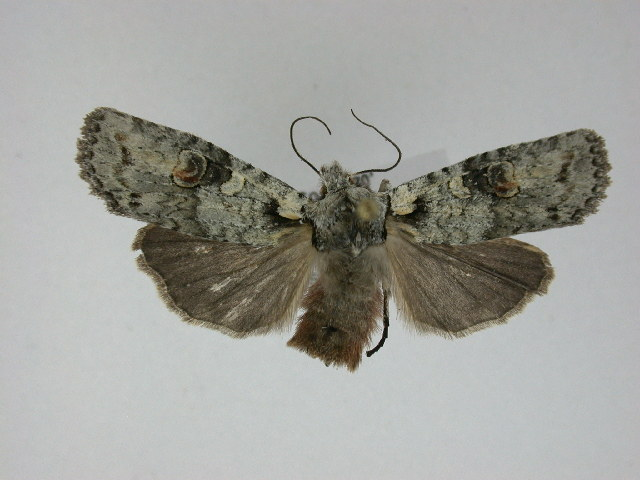

Scientific classification
- Kingdom: Animalia
- Phylum: Arthropoda
- Class: Insecta
- Order: Lepidoptera
- Superfamily: Noctuoidea
- Family: Noctuidae
- Genus: Lithophane
- Species: L. baileyi

Binomial name
- Lithophane baileyi Grote, 1877

Synonyms
- Lithophane vivida (Dyar, 1910)

= Lithophane baileyi =

Species of moth

Lithophane baileyi, or Bailey's pinion, is a species of cutworm or dart moth in the family Noctuidae. It is found in North America.

The MONA or Hodges number for Lithophane baileyi is 9902.
