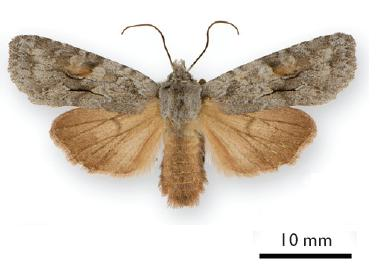
- Lithophane abita (female)
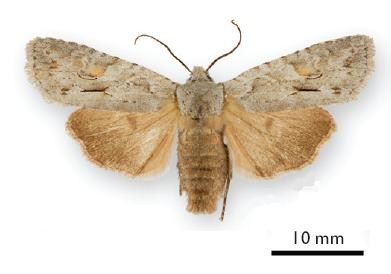
- Lithophane abita (male)

Scientific classification
- Domain: Eukaryota
- Kingdom: Animalia
- Phylum: Arthropoda
- Class: Insecta
- Order: Lepidoptera
- Superfamily: Noctuoidea
- Family: Noctuidae
- Genus: Lithophane
- Species: L. abita

Binomial name
- Lithophane abita Brou & Lafontaine, 2009

= Lithophane abita =

Species of moth

Lithophane abita is a moth of the family Noctuidae. It is found in Alabama, Florida, Georgia, Louisiana, Maryland, Mississippi and North Carolina.

The forewing length is about 17 mm for both males and females. Adults are on wing from late November to late March in Louisiana. Elsewhere the flight season extends from mid October (in Maryland) to early April (in Mississippi and North Carolina).

The larvae probably feed on Taxodium distichum.
