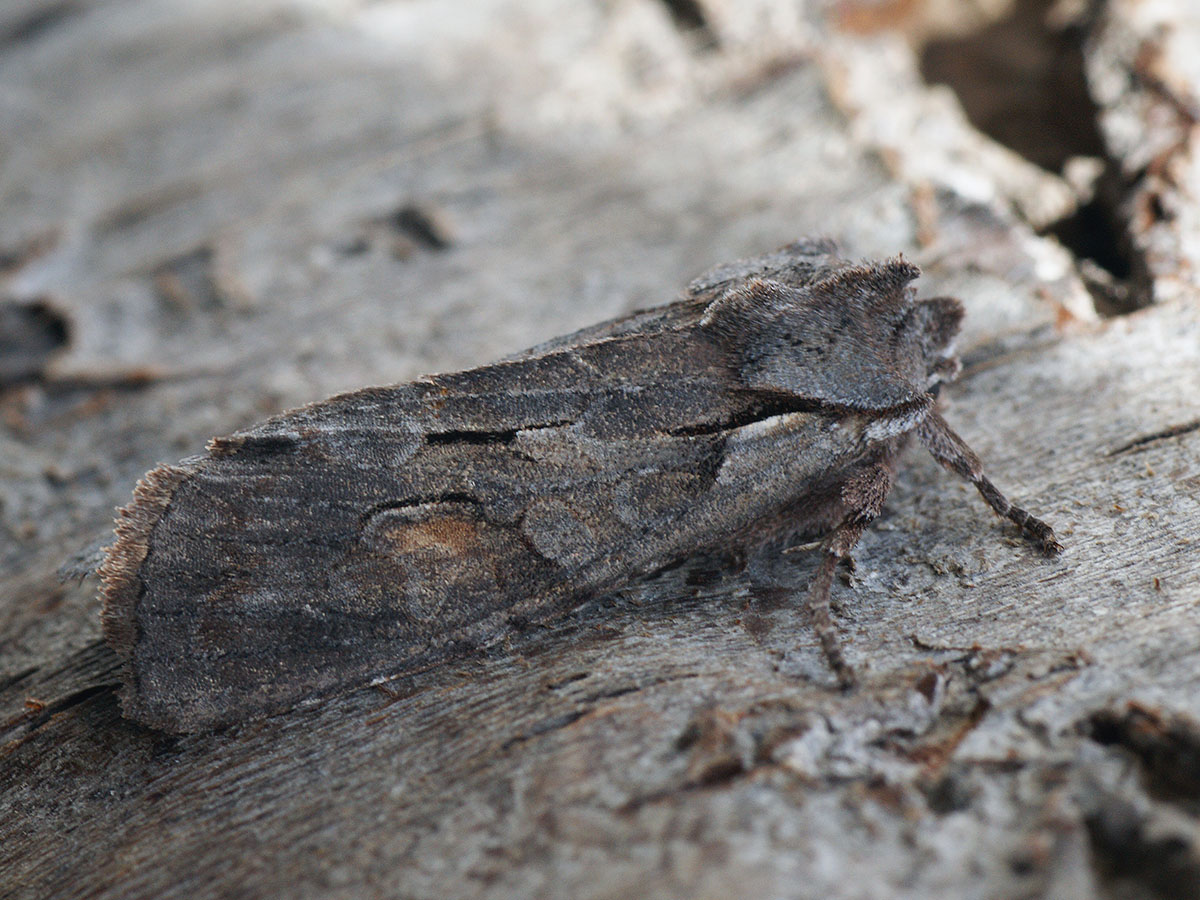

Scientific classification
- Kingdom: Animalia
- Phylum: Arthropoda
- Class: Insecta
- Order: Lepidoptera
- Superfamily: Noctuoidea
- Family: Noctuidae
- Genus: Lithophane
- Species: L. furcifera

Binomial name
- Lithophane furcifera (Hufnagel, 1766)

Synonyms
- Phalaena furcifera Hufnagel, 1766; Noctua conformis Denis & Schiffermüller, 1775; Phalaena angulata Goeze, 1781; Phalaena (Noctua) bifurca Esper, 1788; Phalaena (Noctua) bifurca Esper, 1796

= Lithophane furcifera =

Species of moth

Lithophane furcifera, the conformist, is a moth of the family Noctuidae. The species was first described by Johann Siegfried Hufnagel in 1766. It is found from central Europe, east to the Black Sea region, the Caucasus and western Siberia. In the mountains, it is found up to elevations of 1,800 meters.

== Description in Seitz ==
L. furcifera Hubn. (= bifurca Esp., conformis Hbn.) (30 i). Forewing purplish grey irrorated with olive; a thick black streak from base below cell, upcurved and forked, edged above by a white line; another from claviform to outer line; lines black, edged with pale grey, fairly distinct; claviform and orbicular pale blue grey edged with black; reniform inwardly bearing a fulvous crescent, its lower edge curved and black; a dark median shade and a narrow one before submarginal line; hindwing brownish fuscous, darker towards termen, sometimes showing a large cellspot and dark outer line; ab. rufescens Spul. has the forewing more or less flushed with reddish; nearly all of these, however, seem to be females, while the males remain dark purple grey without the red tinge; — ab. suffusa Tutt from the West of England is violet black; ab. variegata Spuler corresponding to the zinckenii form of lamda is much more variegated, the dark markings being relieved by silvery grey. — Larva red brown or earth brown marbled with black dots and streaks; the lines pale yellow; a dorsal series of diamond shaped marks and subdorsal series of oblique black streaks; another form of the larva is said to be green marked with yellow. The wingspan is 42–48 mm.

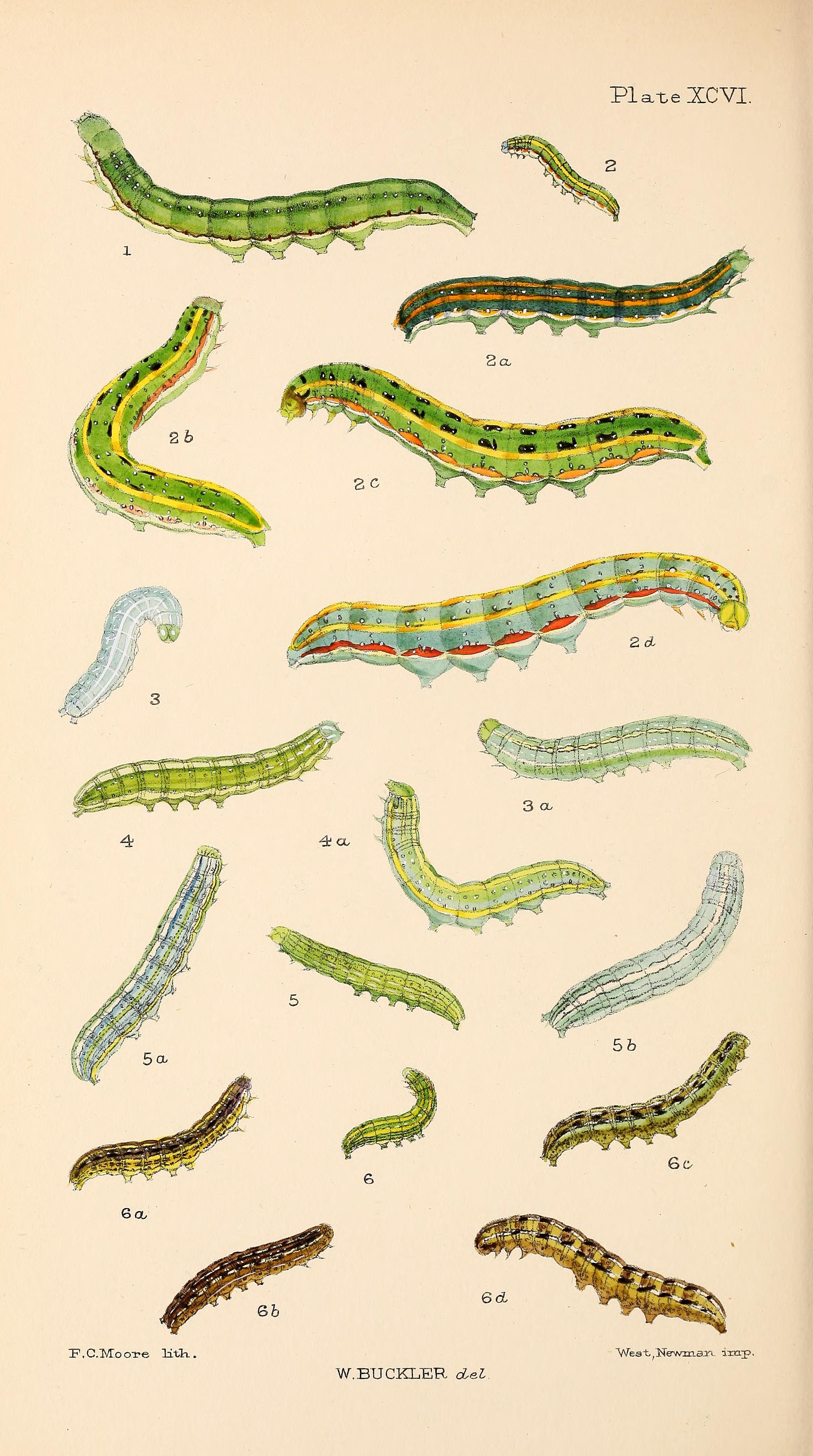
Figs. .6, 6a, 6b, 6c, 6d larvae in various stages

== Biology ==
Adults are on wing from August to (after overwintering) June of the following year. There is one generation per year.

The larvae feed on the leaves of Betula, Quercus, Alnus, Salix and Populus species. Larvae can be found from May to July.
