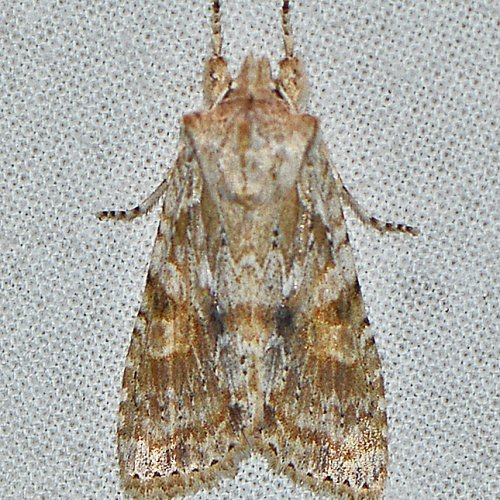

Scientific classification
- Domain: Eukaryota
- Kingdom: Animalia
- Phylum: Arthropoda
- Class: Insecta
- Order: Lepidoptera
- Superfamily: Noctuoidea
- Family: Noctuidae
- Tribe: Xylenini
- Subtribe: Xylenina
- Genus: Lithophane
- Species: L. bethunei

Binomial name
- Lithophane bethunei (Grote & Robinson, 1868)

= Lithophane bethunei =

Bethune's pinion

Species of moth

Lithophane bethunei, or Bethune's pinion, is a species of cutworm or dart moth in the family Noctuidae. It is found in North America.

The MONA or Hodges number for Lithophane bethunei is 9887.
