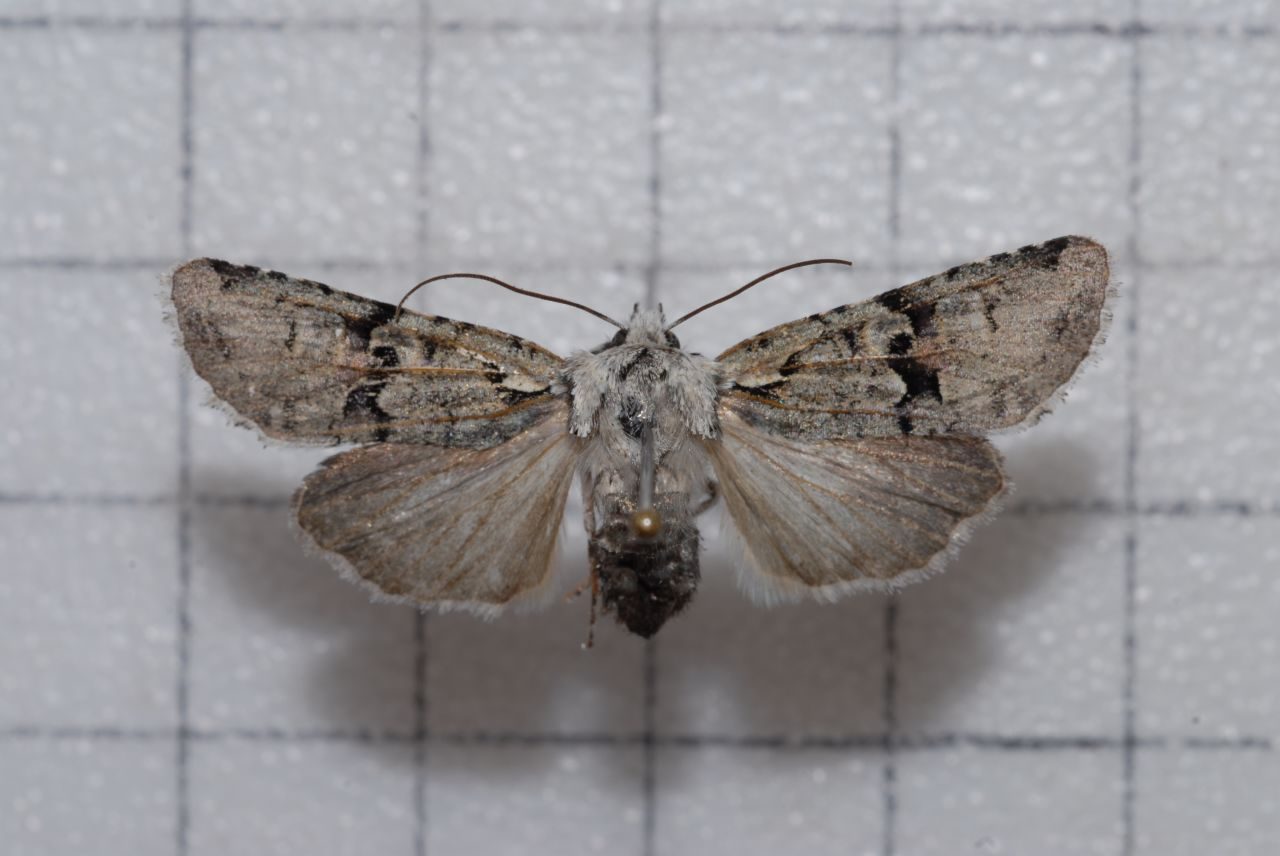
- Lithophane venusta yazakii female

Scientific classification
- Kingdom: Animalia
- Phylum: Arthropoda
- Clade: Pancrustacea
- Class: Insecta
- Order: Lepidoptera
- Superfamily: Noctuoidea
- Family: Noctuidae
- Genus: Lithophane
- Species: L. venusta

Binomial name
- Lithophane venusta (Leech, 1889)

Synonyms
- Lamprosticta venusta Leech, 1889

= Lithophane venusta =

Species of moth

Lithophane venusta is a moth in the family Noctuidae. It is found in Taiwan, Japan and Nepal.

The wingspan is 36–39 mm.

== Subspecies ==
- Lithophane venusta venusta
- Lithophane venusta fibigeri Hreblay & Ronkay, 1998 (Nepal)
- Lithophane venusta yazakii Yoshimoto, 1988 (Taiwan)
