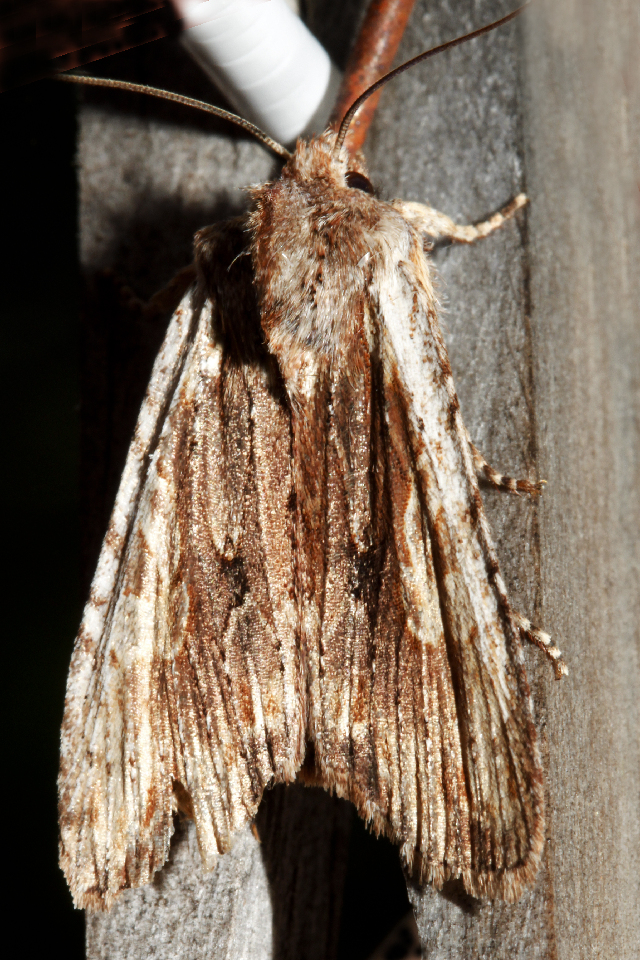

Scientific classification
- Kingdom: Animalia
- Phylum: Arthropoda
- Class: Insecta
- Order: Lepidoptera
- Superfamily: Noctuoidea
- Family: Noctuidae
- Genus: Lithophane
- Species: L. petulca

Binomial name
- Lithophane petulca Grote, 1874

Synonyms
- Lithophane ferrealis Grote, 1874

= Lithophane petulca =

Species of moth

Lithophane petulca, the wanton pinion, is a species of cutworm or dart moth in the family Noctuidae. It is found in North America.

The MONA or Hodges number for Lithophane petulca is 9889.
