= Lithophane tepida =

Scientific classification
- Kingdom: Animalia
- Phylum: Arthropoda
- Class: Insecta
- Order: Lepidoptera
- Superfamily: Noctuoidea
- Family: Noctuidae
- Genus: Lithophane
- Species: L. tepida

Binomial name
- Lithophane tepida Grote, 1874

Species of insect (moth)

Lithophane tepida, the luke-warm pinion moth, is a species of cutworm or dart moth in the family Noctuidae. It is found in North America.

The MONA or Hodges number for Lithophane tepida is 9909.
