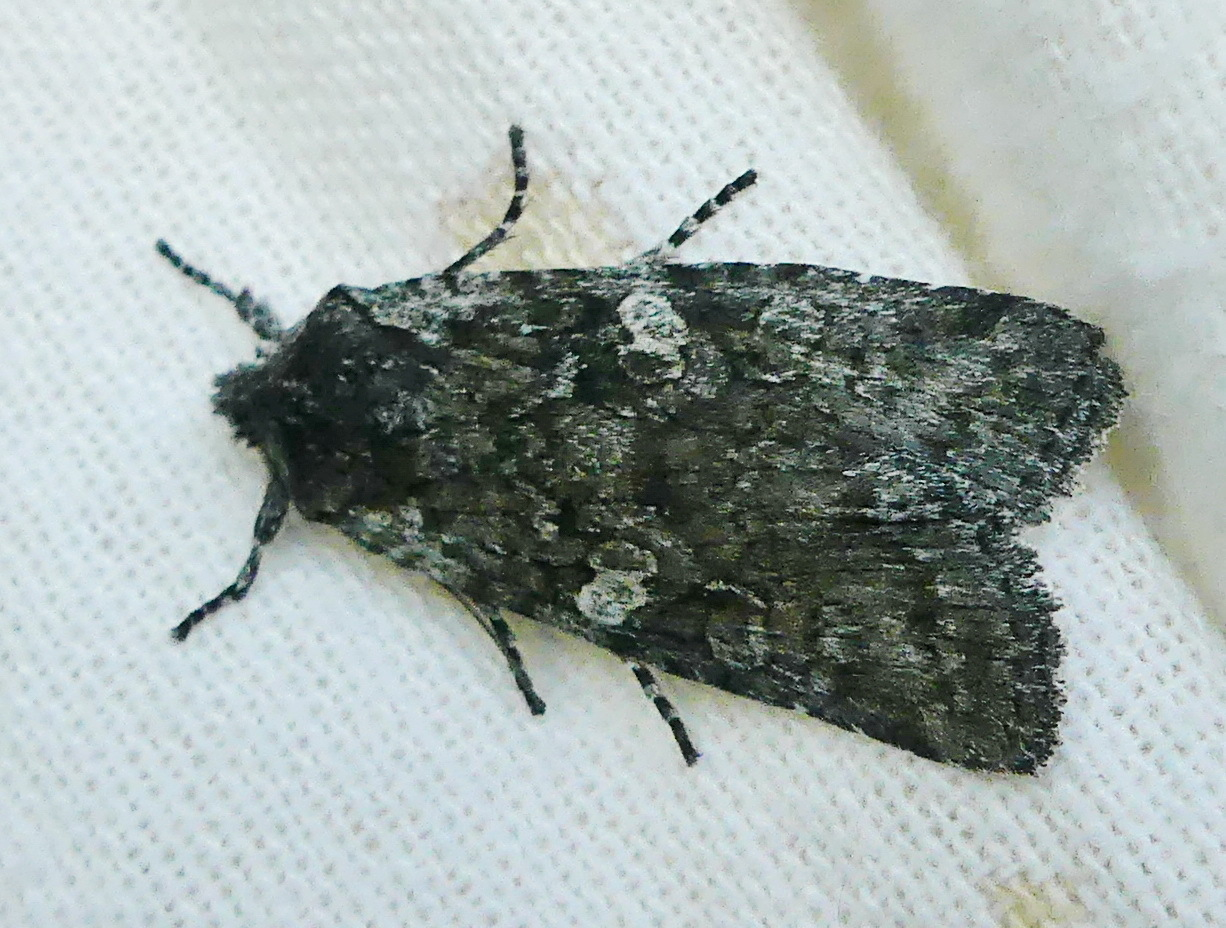

Scientific classification
- Kingdom: Animalia
- Phylum: Arthropoda
- Class: Insecta
- Order: Lepidoptera
- Superfamily: Noctuoidea
- Family: Noctuidae
- Genus: Lithophane
- Species: L. grotei

Binomial name
- Lithophane grotei Riley, 1882

= Lithophane grotei =

Species of moth

Lithophane grotei, commonly known as Grote's pinion or Grote's sallow, is a species of moth in the family Noctuidae. It was first described by Riley in 1882 and it is found in North America.

The MONA or Hodges number for Lithophane grotei is 9915.
