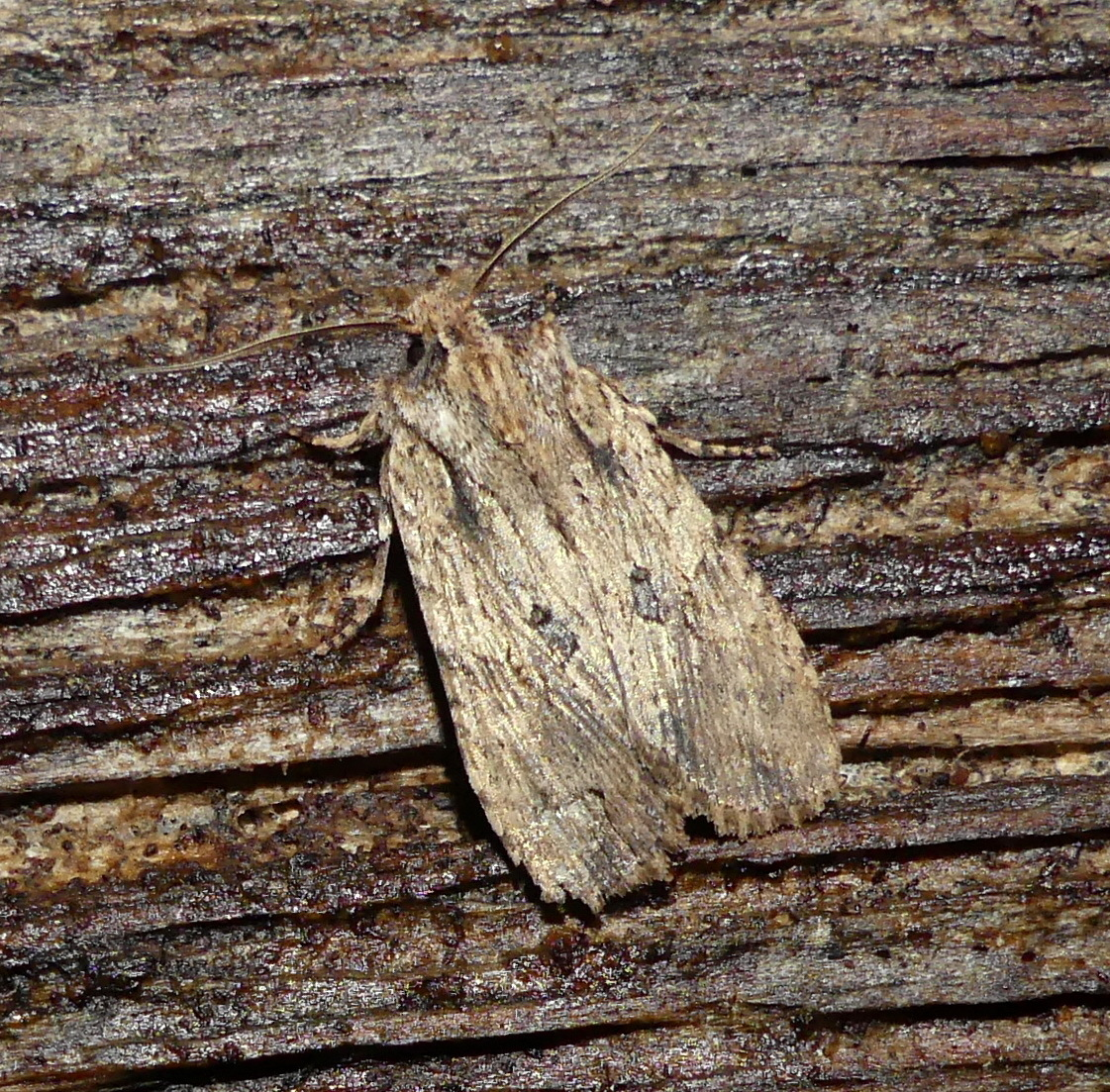

Scientific classification
- Kingdom: Animalia
- Phylum: Arthropoda
- Class: Insecta
- Order: Lepidoptera
- Superfamily: Noctuoidea
- Family: Noctuidae
- Tribe: Xylenini
- Subtribe: Xylenina
- Genus: Lithophane
- Species: L. patefacta

Binomial name
- Lithophane patefacta (Walker, 1858)

= Lithophane patefacta =

Species of moth

Lithophane patefacta, the dimorphic pinion, is a species of cutworm or dart moth in the family Noctuidae. It is found in North America.

The MONA or Hodges number for Lithophane patefacta is 9886.
