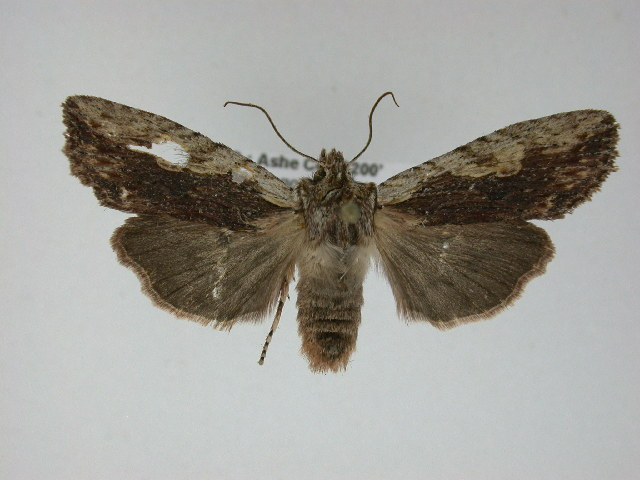
- Caterpillar

Scientific classification
- Domain: Eukaryota
- Kingdom: Animalia
- Phylum: Arthropoda
- Class: Insecta
- Order: Lepidoptera
- Superfamily: Noctuoidea
- Family: Noctuidae
- Genus: Lithophane
- Species: L. innominata

Binomial name
- Lithophane innominata Smith, 1893

Synonyms
- Xylina innominata; Lithophane illecebra

= Lithophane innominata =

Species of moth

Lithophane innominata, the nameless pinion, is a moth of the family Noctuidae. The species was first described by Smith in 1893. It is found in North America from Nova Scotia and New Brunswick west to Vancouver Island, south through the mountains both eastwards and westwards. Furthermore, it is found throughout the wooded parts of Alberta, north to Lake Athabasca.

The wingspan is 35–39 mm. The moth flies from September to October and from April to May depending on the location.

The larvae feed on a wide variety of trees.
