= Lithophane contra =

Scientific classification
- Domain: Eukaryota
- Kingdom: Animalia
- Phylum: Arthropoda
- Class: Insecta
- Order: Lepidoptera
- Superfamily: Noctuoidea
- Family: Noctuidae
- Genus: Lithophane
- Species: L. contra

Binomial name
- Lithophane contra (Barnes & Benjamin, 1924)

Species of moth

Lithophane contra, the anti-pinion, is a species of cutworm or dart moth in the family Noctuidae. It was first described by William Barnes and Foster Hendrickson Benjamin in 1924 and it is found in North America.

The MONA or Hodges number for Lithophane contra is 9897.
