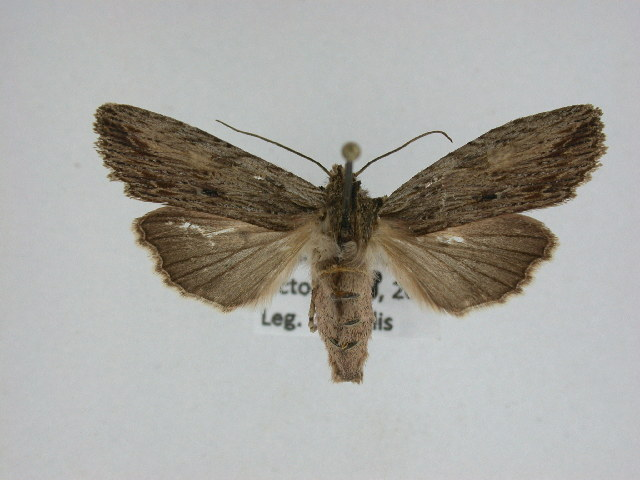

Scientific classification
- Kingdom: Animalia
- Phylum: Arthropoda
- Clade: Pancrustacea
- Class: Insecta
- Order: Lepidoptera
- Superfamily: Noctuoidea
- Family: Noctuidae
- Genus: Lithophane
- Species: L. signosa

Binomial name
- Lithophane signosa (Walker, 1857)

= Lithophane signosa =

Species of moth

Lithophane signosa, the signate pinion or sycamore pinion moth, is a species of moth in the family Noctuidae (owlet moths). The species was described by Francis Walker in 1857. It is found in North America.

The MONA or Hodges number for Lithophane signosa is 9895.
