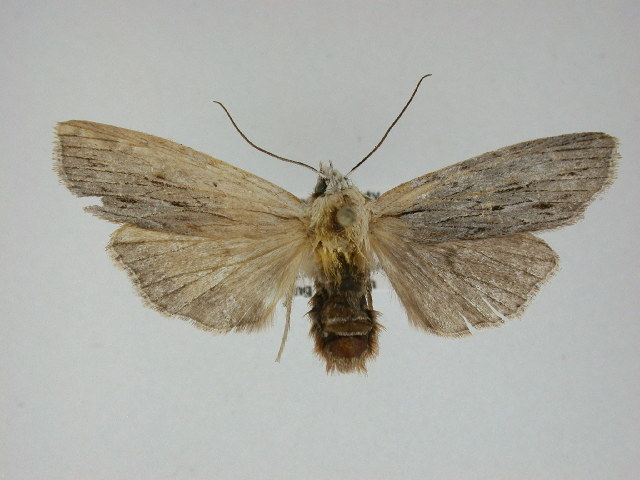

Conservation status
- Vulnerable (IUCN 3.1)

Scientific classification
- Domain: Eukaryota
- Kingdom: Animalia
- Phylum: Arthropoda
- Class: Insecta
- Order: Lepidoptera
- Superfamily: Noctuoidea
- Family: Noctuidae
- Genus: Lithophane
- Species: L. lemmeri

Binomial name
- Lithophane lemmeri Barnes & Benjamin, 1929

= Lithophane lemmeri =

Species of moth

Lithophane lemmeri, Lemmer's noctuid moth or Lemmer's pinion, is a moth of the family Noctuidae. It is found in the eastern parts of the United States and adjacent areas in Canada. It is listed as a species of special concern in the US state of Connecticut. The species was first described by William Barnes and Foster Hendrickson Benjamin in 1929.

The wingspan is about 40 mm. The moth flies from June to July depending on the location.

== Larval foods ==
The larvae feed on Chamaecyparis thyoides and Juniperus virginiana.
