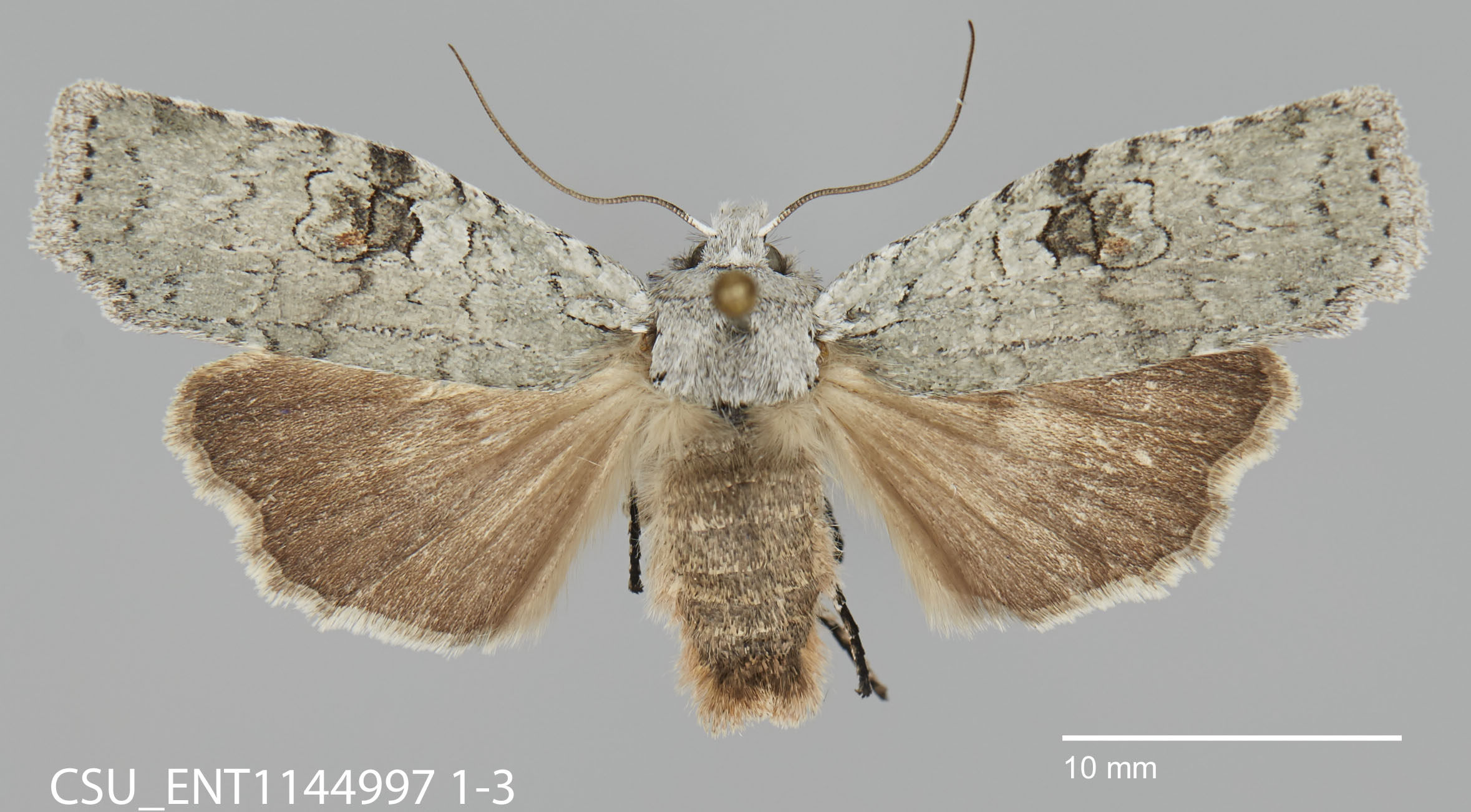

Scientific classification
- Kingdom: Animalia
- Phylum: Arthropoda
- Class: Insecta
- Order: Lepidoptera
- Superfamily: Noctuoidea
- Family: Noctuidae
- Genus: Lithophane
- Species: L. viridipallens

Binomial name
- Lithophane viridipallens Grote, 1877

= Lithophane viridipallens =

Species of moth

Lithophane viridipallens, the pale green pinion moth, is a moth of the family Noctuidae that is native to North America. It is listed as a species of special concern in the US state of Connecticut. It was described by Augustus Radcliffe Grote in 1877.
