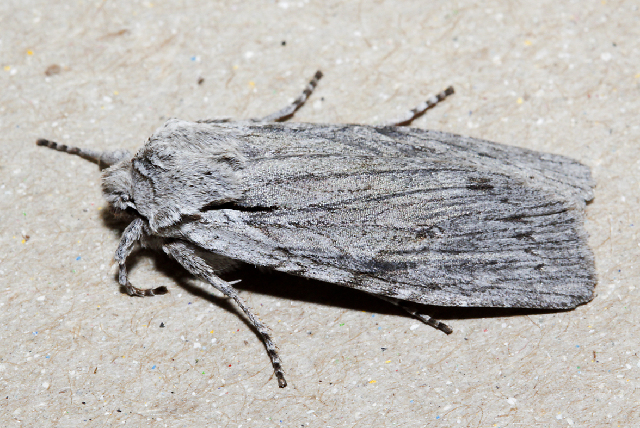

Scientific classification
- Kingdom: Animalia
- Phylum: Arthropoda
- Class: Insecta
- Order: Lepidoptera
- Superfamily: Noctuoidea
- Family: Noctuidae
- Genus: Lithophane
- Species: L. georgii

Binomial name
- Lithophane georgii Grote, 1875

= Lithophane georgii =

Species of moth

Lithophane georgii, known generally as George's pinion moth, is a species of cutworm or dart moth in the family Noctuidae. Other common names include the large grey pinion and green fruitworm. It is found in North America.

The MONA or Hodges number for Lithophane georgii is 9913.
