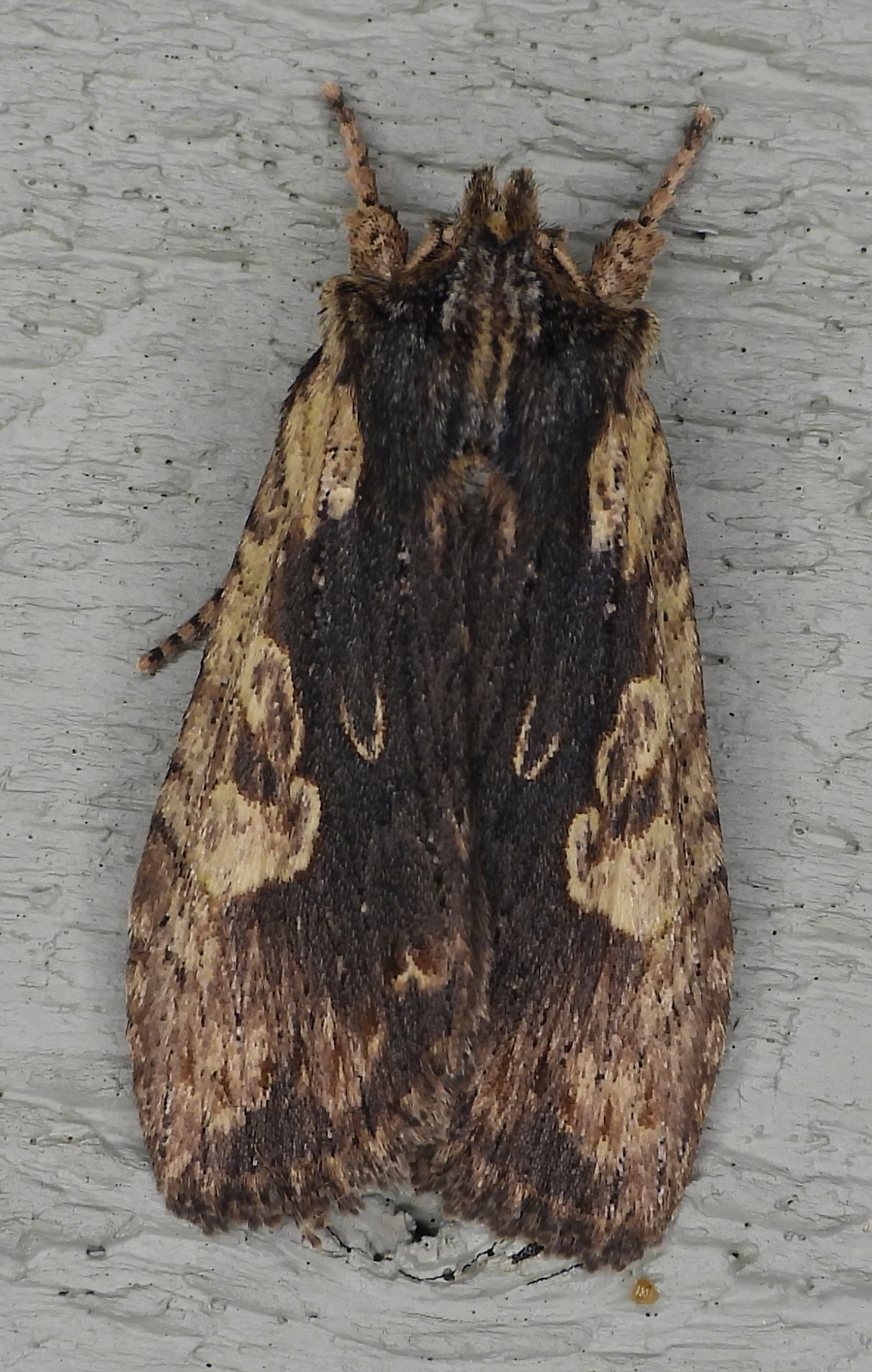

Scientific classification
- Kingdom: Animalia
- Phylum: Arthropoda
- Class: Insecta
- Order: Lepidoptera
- Superfamily: Noctuoidea
- Family: Noctuidae
- Genus: Lithophane
- Species: L. hemina

Binomial name
- Lithophane hemina Grote, 1874

= Lithophane hemina =

Species of moth

Lithophane hemina, the hemina pinion, is a species of cutworm or dart moth belonging to the family Noctuidae. It is found in North America.

The MONA or Hodges number for Lithophane hemina is 9893.
