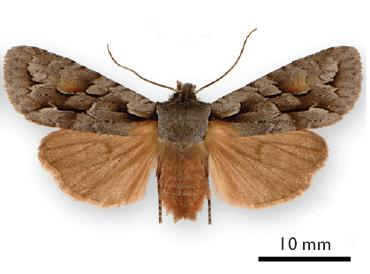

Scientific classification
- Domain: Eukaryota
- Kingdom: Animalia
- Phylum: Arthropoda
- Class: Insecta
- Order: Lepidoptera
- Superfamily: Noctuoidea
- Family: Noctuidae
- Genus: Lithophane
- Species: L. thaxteri

Binomial name
- Lithophane thaxteri Grote, 1874

= Lithophane thaxteri =

Species of moth

Lithophane thaxteri, or Thaxter's pinion, is a species of moth in the family Noctuidae. It is found in North America.

The wingspan is about 36 mm.

The larvae mainly feed on Myrica gale.

== Subspecies ==
- Lithophane thaxteri thaxteri (Grote, 1874) – Massachusetts
- Lithophane thaxteri alaskensis (Barnes, 1928) – Alaska
- Lithophane thaxteri rosetta (Barnes, 1928) – British Columbia
