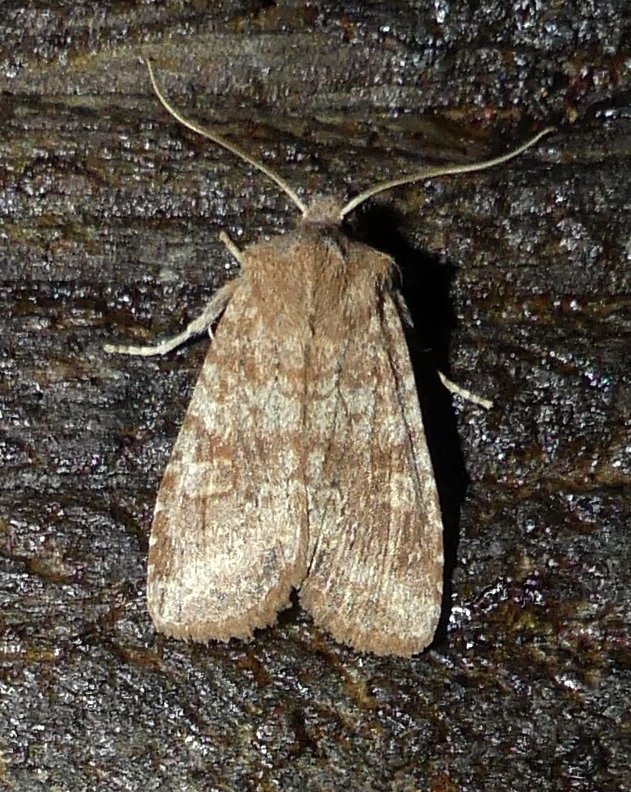

Scientific classification
- Kingdom: Animalia
- Phylum: Arthropoda
- Clade: Pancrustacea
- Class: Insecta
- Order: Lepidoptera
- Superfamily: Noctuoidea
- Family: Noctuidae
- Genus: Lithophane
- Species: L. semiusta

Binomial name
- Lithophane semiusta Grote, 1874

= Lithophane semiusta =

Species of moth

Lithophane semiusta, the singed pinion, is a species of dart moth in the family Noctuidae found in North America.
