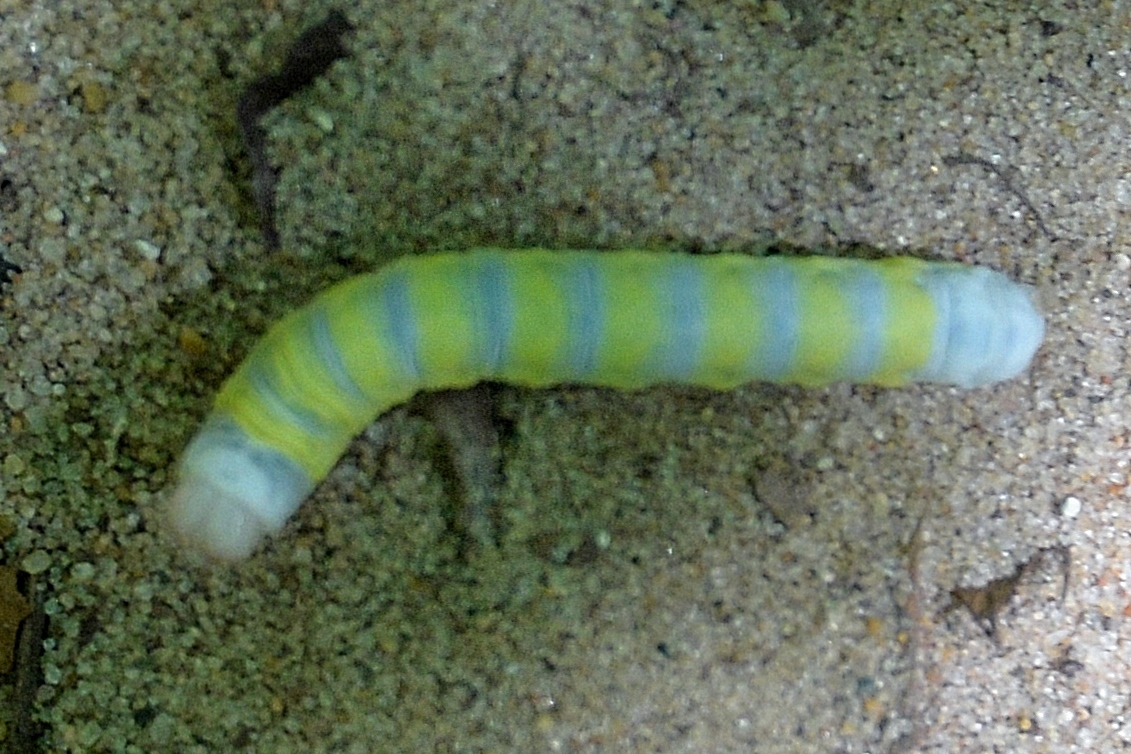
- Larva

Scientific classification
- Kingdom: Animalia
- Phylum: Arthropoda
- Class: Insecta
- Order: Lepidoptera
- Superfamily: Noctuoidea
- Family: Noctuidae
- Genus: Lithophane
- Species: L. querquera

Binomial name
- Lithophane querquera Grote, 1874

Synonyms
- Lithophane nigrescens (Engel, 1905)

= Lithophane querquera =

Species of moth

Lithophane querquera, the shivering pinion, is a species of cutworm or dart moth in the family Noctuidae. It is found in North America.

The MONA or Hodges number for Lithophane querquera is 9904.
