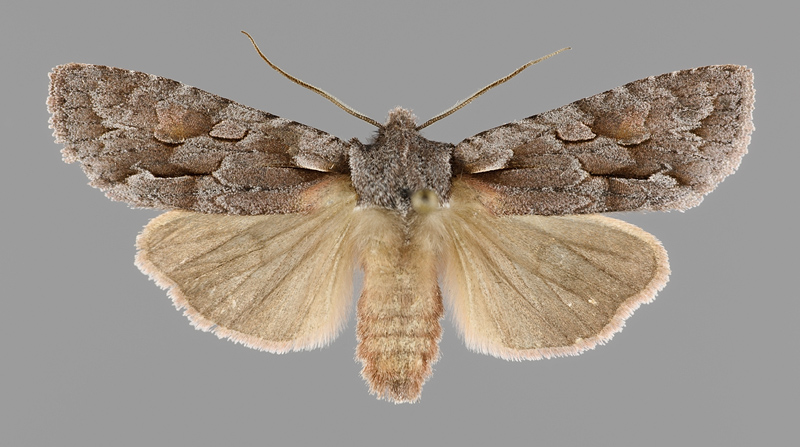
- Male
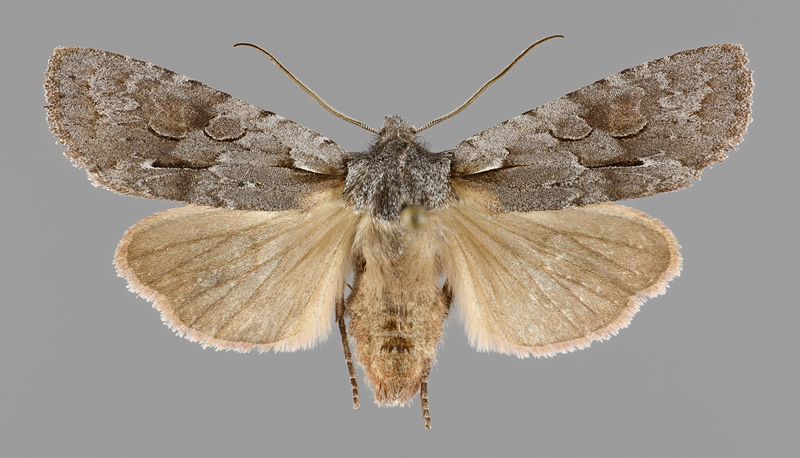
- Female

Scientific classification
- Kingdom: Animalia
- Phylum: Arthropoda
- Clade: Pancrustacea
- Class: Insecta
- Order: Lepidoptera
- Superfamily: Noctuoidea
- Family: Noctuidae
- Genus: Lithophane
- Species: L. lamda

Binomial name
- Lithophane lamda (Fabricius, 1787)

Synonyms
- Noctua lamda Fabricius, 1787; Xylina zinckenii Treitschke, 1826; Xylina somniculosa Hering, 1841; Xylina rufescens Siervers, 1857

= Lithophane lamda =

Species of moth

Lithophane lamda, the nonconformist, is a moth of the family Noctuidae. It is found throughout Europe, except in southern Europe (the Iberian Peninsula, the Balkan Peninsula and Italy). It is also absent from Iceland and Ireland.

== Technical description and variation ==
L. lamda F. (= rufescens Men.) (30 i). Forewing dark blue grey, very finely irrorated with olive brown. A short black streak from base below cell with rufous suffusion below it; another on submedian fold between inner and outer lines with dark suffusion above it; lines obscure, interrupted; orbicular stigma triangular, blue grey, outlined with black; reniform large, its lower lobe curved below and edged with black, filled up with rufous suffusion which basewards joins the orbicular; submarginal line ill-defined; hindwing brownish fuscous, darker towards termen; fringe brownish white: underside dull red; ab. zinckenii Tr. (30 i) is a much gayer insect; the ground colour is pale silvery grey, and the dark suffusion deep olive, without the brown or rufous tint, which only exists, and that to a much smaller extent, in the lower part of the reniform; all the dark markings and the lines are emphasised with white; the submarginal line is distinct followed by a dark mingled shade; hindwing fuscous brown, with nearly white fringe; ab. somniculosa Hering (30 i) is smaller than the type, with darker, purplish grey, ground colour, the stigmata and lines hardly visible but with a distinct sinuous median dark olive shade; the two dark streaks both strongly expressed; hind-wing brown, with the fringe rufous. Larva blue green dotted with white; dorsal and subdorsal lines white; spiracular line yellow; spiracles white edged with brown. The wingspan is 39–44 mm.

== Biology ==
Adults are on wing from the start of September to the beginning of November and after overwintering from the end of February to mid May in one generation.

The larvae feed on Myrica gale, Vaccinium myrtillus, Vaccinium uliginosum, Chamaedaphne calyculata and, Ledum palustre.
