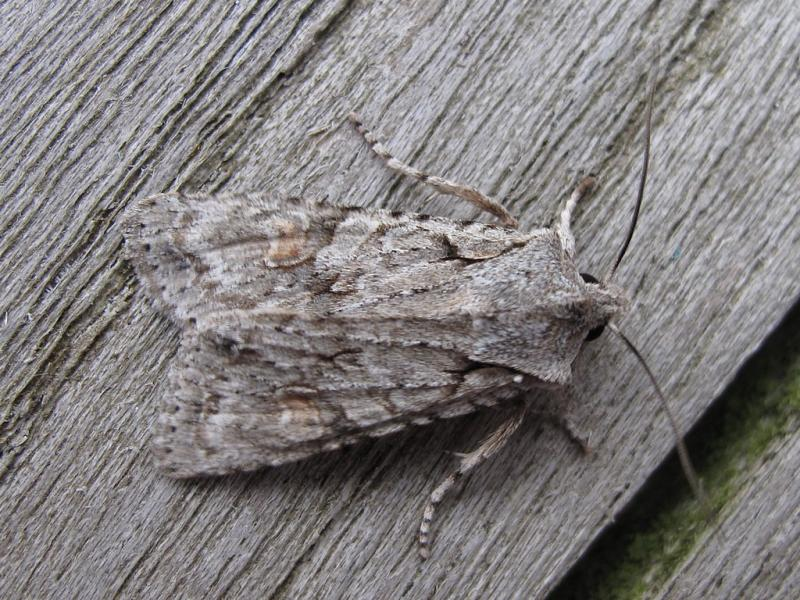

Scientific classification
- Domain: Eukaryota
- Kingdom: Animalia
- Phylum: Arthropoda
- Class: Insecta
- Order: Lepidoptera
- Superfamily: Noctuoidea
- Family: Noctuidae
- Genus: Lithophane
- Species: L. ornitopus

Binomial name
- Lithophane ornitopus (Hufnagel, 1766)

Synonyms
- Phalaena ornitopus Hufnagel, 1766; Lithophane pitzalisi Hartig, 1976; Noctua rizolitha Denis & Schiffermüller, 1775; Lithophane lactipennis Dadd, 1911

= Lithophane ornitopus =

Species of moth

Lithophane ornitopus, the grey shoulder-knot, is a moth of the family Noctuidae. The species was first described by Johann Siegfried Hufnagel in 1766 and is found in most of the Palearctic realm from Ireland east to Siberia.

== Technical description and variation ==
The wingspan is 32–38 mm. Its forewings are grey white; a bifurcate black streak from base below cell; lines indistinct, pale with dotted edges; stigmata grey with partial black outlines and paler rings; the lower lobe of the reniform orange tinged; claviform sometimes connected by a black streak with outer line, and often a dark spot between the stigmata; submarginal line waved, white, preceded by dark marks; hindwing grey; the whiter forms are separated as ab. pallida Spul.

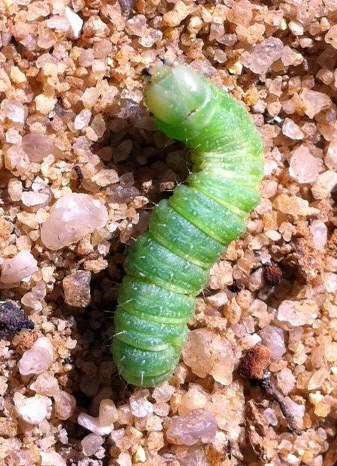
Larva

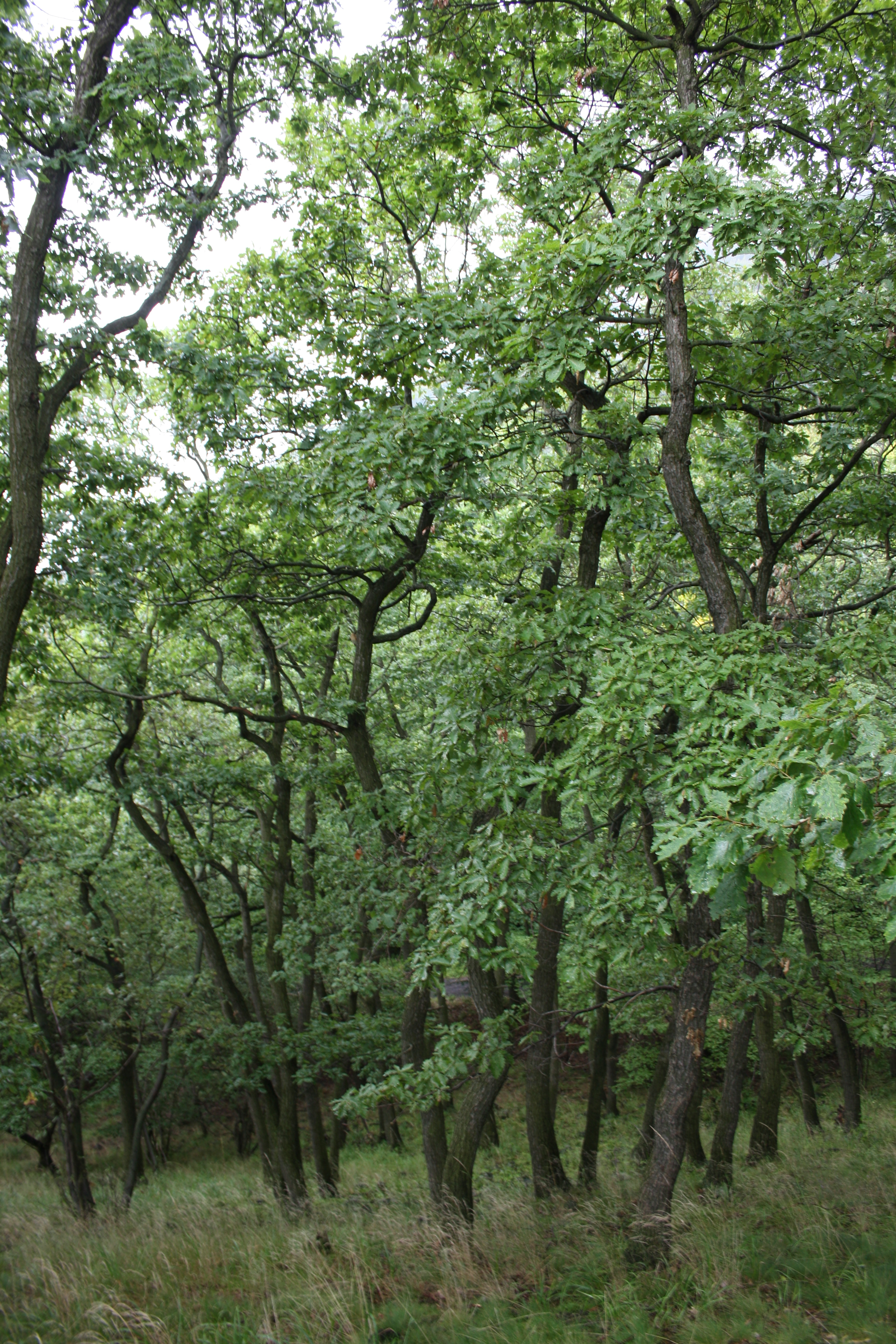
Habitat in the Czech Republic

== Biology ==
Adults are on wing from late August to November and, after overwintering, again from the end of February to mid-May. The larvae are bluish green dotted with white; dorsal and subdorsal lines white; spiracular line yellowish white. The larvae feed on various deciduous trees, but mainly oak (Quercus species) and can be found from April to June. It overwinters as an adult. It is mainly found at the edges of forest and meadow habitats as well as in heathlands and park landscapes.

== Subspecies ==
- Lithophane ornitopus ornitopus
- Lithophane ornitopus pitzalisi Hartig, 1976 (Sardinia)
