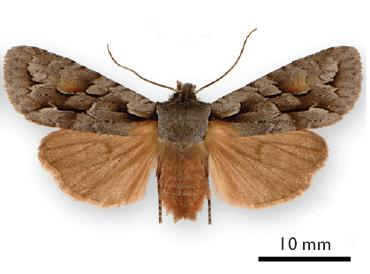
- Lithophane thaxteri

Scientific classification
- Kingdom: Animalia
- Phylum: Arthropoda
- Clade: Pancrustacea
- Class: Insecta
- Order: Lepidoptera
- Superfamily: Noctuoidea
- Family: Noctuidae
- Subfamily: Xyleninae
- Tribe: Xylenini
- Subtribe: Xylenina
- Genus: Lithophane; Hübner, 1821

= Lithophane (moth) =

Genus of moths

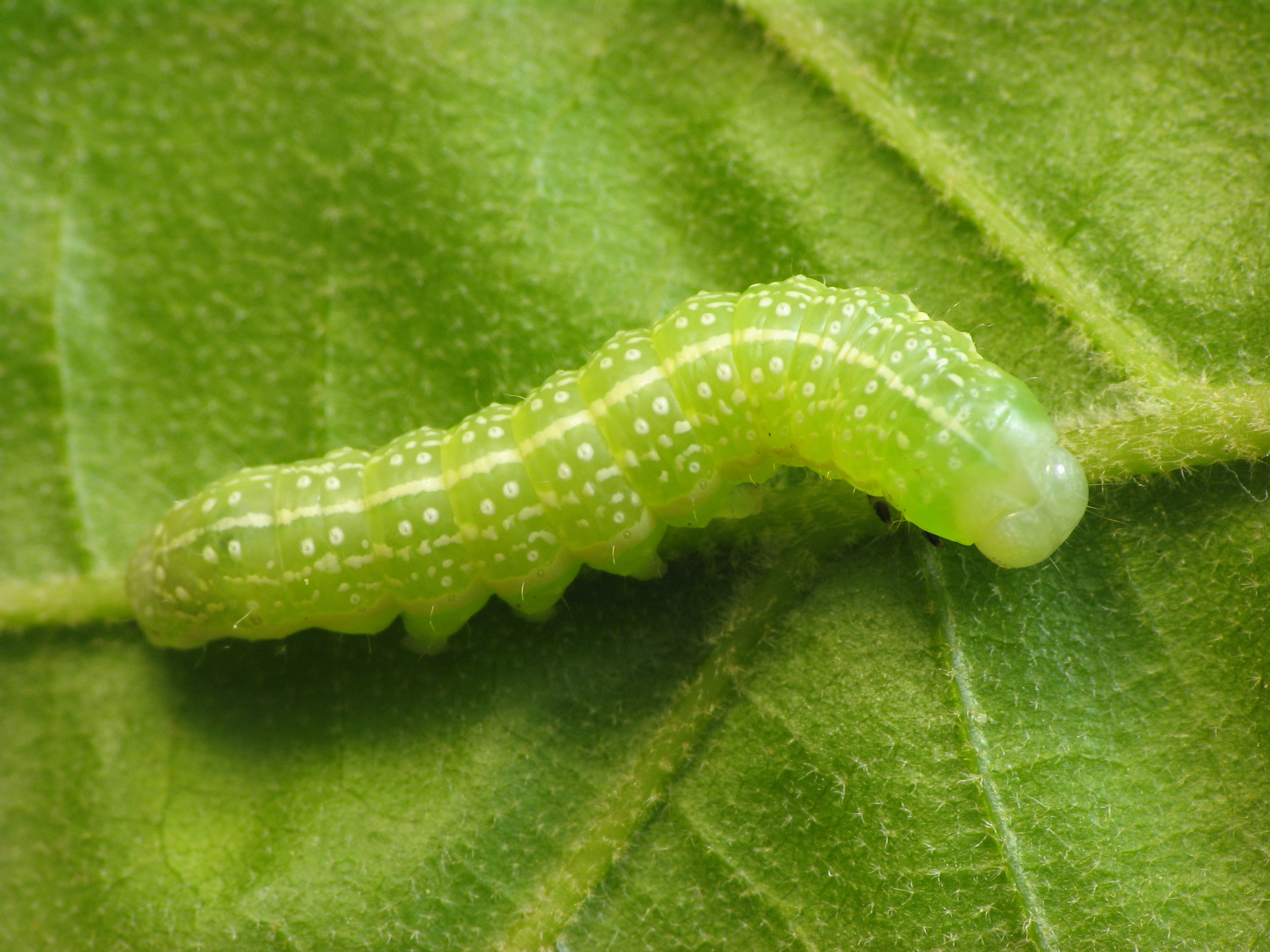
Lithophane antennata caterpillar on oak leaf

Lithophane is a genus of moths of the family Noctuidae. They spend the winter as adults. Some species are capable of feeding on other caterpillars or on sawfly larvae, which is rather uncommon among Lepidoptera.

== Species ==
- Lithophane abita Brou & Lafontaine, 2009
- Lithophane adipel Benjamin, 1936
- Lithophane alaina Boursin, 1957
- Lithophane amanda (Smith, 1900)
- Lithophane antennata (Walker, 1858)
- Lithophane atara (Smith, 1909)
- Lithophane baileyi Grote, 1877 (syn: Lithophane vivida (Dyar, 1910))
- Lithophane bethunei (Grote & Robinson, 1868)
- Lithophane boogeri J.T.Troubridge, 2006
- Lithophane brachyptera (Staudinger, 1892)
- Lithophane consocia – Scarce Conformist (Borkhausen, 1792)
- Lithophane contenta Grote, 1800
- Lithophane contra (Barnes & Benjamin, 1924)
- Lithophane dailekhi Hreblay & Ronkay, 1999
- Lithophane dilatocula (Smith, 1900)
- Lithophane disposita Morrison, 1874
- Lithophane fagina Morrison, 1874
- Lithophane franclemonti Metzler, 1998
- Lithophane furcifera – The Conformist (Hufnagel, 1766)
- Lithophane furiosa Hreblay & Ronkay, 1999
- Lithophane gansuana Kononenko, 2009
- Lithophane gausapata Grote, 1883
- Lithophane georgii Grote, 1875
- Lithophane glauca Hreblay & Ronkay, 1998
- Lithophane griseobrunnea Hreblay & Ronkay, 1999
- Lithophane grotei (Riley, 1882)
- Lithophane hemina Grote, 1879
- Lithophane holophaea Draudt, 1934
- Lithophane innominata – Nameless Pinion (Smith, 1893)
- Lithophane itata (Smith, 1899)
- Lithophane jeffreyi J.T. Troubridge & Lafontaine, 2003
- Lithophane joannis Covell & Metzler 1992
- Lithophane laceyi (Barnes & McDunnough, 1913)
- Lithophane lamda – The Nonconformist (Fabricius, 1787)
- Lithophane lanei J.T.Troubridge, 2006
- Lithophane lapidea (Hübner, [1808])
- Lithophane laticinerea Grote, 1874
- Lithophane laurentii Köhler, 1961
- Lithophane leautieri – Blair's Shoulder-Knot (Boisduval, 1829)
- Lithophane ledereri Staudinger, 1891
- Lithophane leeae Walsh, 2009
- Lithophane lemmeri – Lemmer's Pinion Barnes & Benjamin, 1929
- Lithophane lepida Grote, 1878
- Lithophane longior (Smith, 1899)
- Lithophane merckii (Rambur, 1832)
- Lithophane nagaii Sugi, 1958
- Lithophane nasar (Smith, 1909)
- Lithophane oriunda Grote, 1874
- Lithophane ornitopus – Grey Shoulder-Knot (Hufnagel, 1766)
- Lithophane pacifica Kononenko, 1978
- Lithophane patefacta (Walker, 1858)
- Lithophane pertorrida (McDunnough, 1942)
- Lithophane petulca Grote, 1874 (syn: Lithophane ferrealis Grote, 1874)
- Lithophane pexata Grote, 1874
- Lithophane plumbealis (Matsumura, 1926)
- Lithophane ponderosa J.T. Troubridge & Lafontaine, 2003
- Lithophane pruena (Dyar, 1910)
- Lithophane pruinosa (Butler, 1878)
- Lithophane puella (Smith, 1900)
- Lithophane querquera Grote, 1874 (syn: Lithophane nigrescens (Engel, 1905))
- Lithophane remota Hreblay & Ronkay, 1998
- Lithophane rosinae (Püngeler, 1906)
- Lithophane scottae J.T.Troubridge, 2006
- Lithophane semibrunnea – Tawny Pinion (Haworth, 1809)
- Lithophane semiusta Grote, 1874
- Lithophane signosa (Walker, 1857)
- Lithophane socia – Pale Pinion (Hufnagel, 1766)
- Lithophane subtilis Franclemont, 1969
- Lithophane tarda (Barnes & Benjamin, 1925)
- Lithophane tephrina Franclemont, 1969
- Lithophane tepida Grote, 1874
- Lithophane thaxteri Grote, 1874
- Lithophane thujae Webster & Thomas, 2000
- Lithophane torrida (Smith, 1899)
- Lithophane trimorpha Hreblay & Ronkay, 1997
- Lithophane unimoda (Lintner, 1878)
- Lithophane ustulata (Butler, 1878)
- Lithophane vanduzeei (Barnes, 1928)
- Lithophane venusta (Leech, 1889)
- Lithophane violascens Hreblay & Ronkay, 1999
- Lithophane viridipallens Grote, 1867
