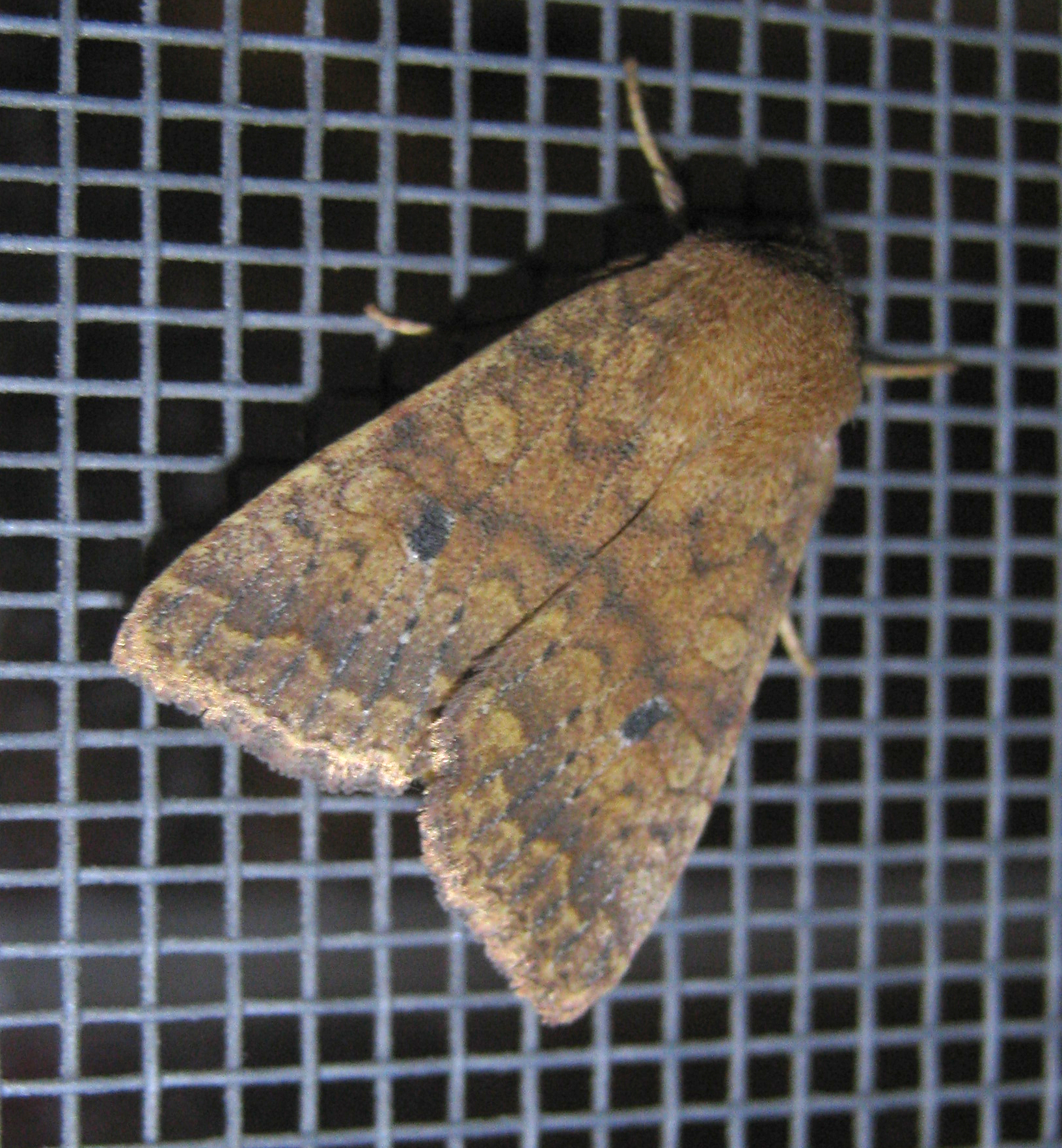
- Sunira bicolorago

Scientific classification
- Kingdom: Animalia
- Phylum: Arthropoda
- Class: Insecta
- Order: Lepidoptera
- Superfamily: Noctuoidea
- Family: Noctuidae
- Subfamily: Xyleninae
- Tribe: Xylenini; Guenée, 1837

Genera
- See text

= Xylenini =

Tribe of moths

The Xylenini are a mid-sized tribe of moths in the Hadeninae subfamily. There is some dispute about this tribe. Some resources have these genera listed under subfamily Cuculliinae instead, or upranked them to a distinct subfamily Xyleninae.

== Genera ==
- Agrochola Hübner, 1821
- Bombycia Stephens, 1829
- Epiglaea Grote, 1878
- Fishia Grote, 1877
- Hillia Grote, 1883
- Lithophane Hübner, 1821
- Mniotype Franclemont, 1941
- Mormo
- Platypolia Grote, 1895
- Sunira Franclemont, 1950
- Sutyna Todd, 1958
- Xanthia Ochsenheimer, 1816
- Xylena Ochsenheimer, 1816
- Xylotype Hampson, 1906
