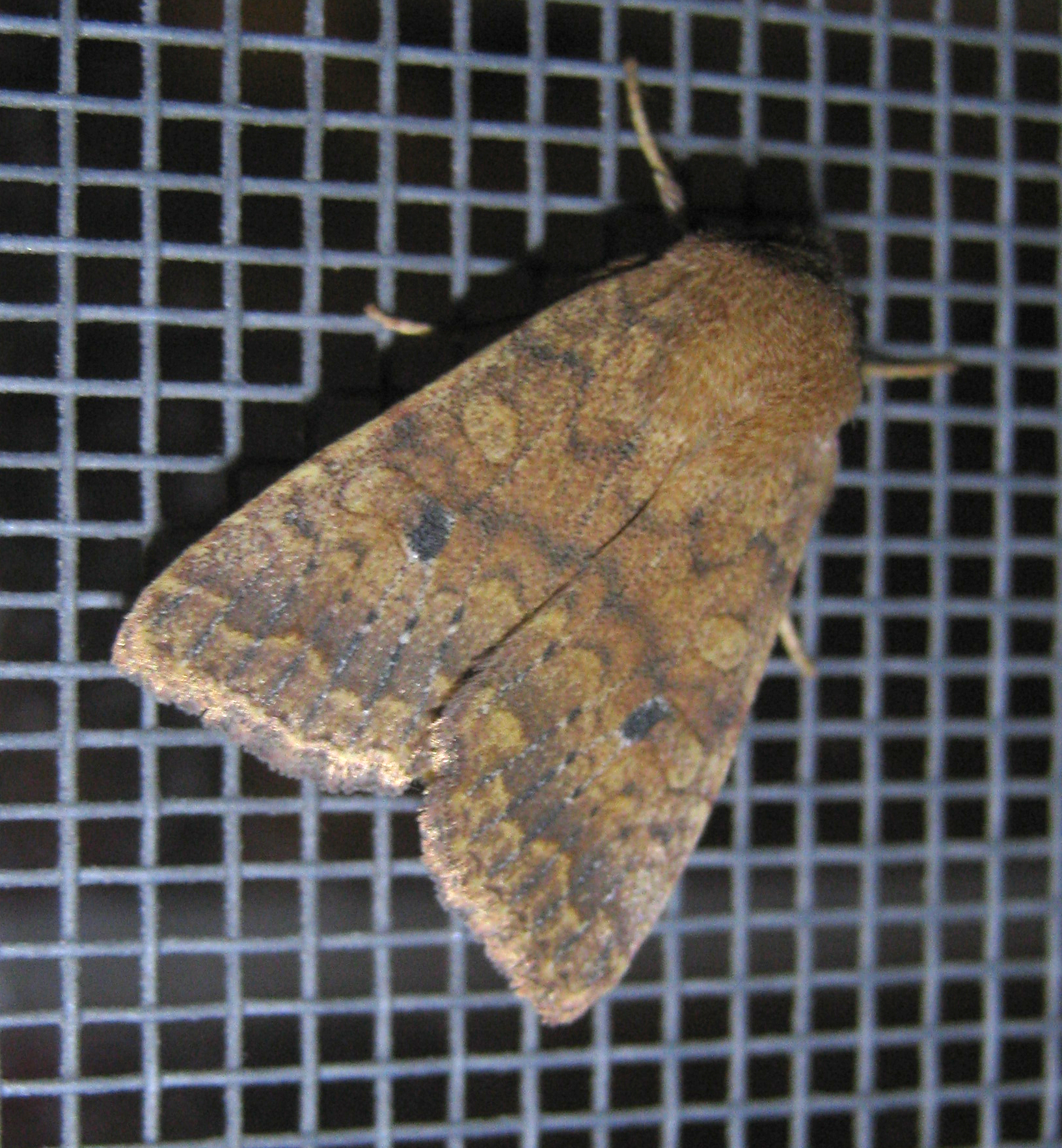
- Sunira bicolorago

Scientific classification
- Domain: Eukaryota
- Kingdom: Animalia
- Phylum: Arthropoda
- Class: Insecta
- Order: Lepidoptera
- Superfamily: Noctuoidea
- Family: Noctuidae
- Subfamily: Noctuinae
- Genus: Sunira; Franclemont, 1950

= Sunira =

Genus of moths

Sunira is a genus of moths of the family Noctuidae. Sunira was treated as a subgenus of Agrochola by Ronkay et al. in 2001, but is still treated as a valid genus by Brian Pitkin et al. at Butterflies and Moths of the World (as of 2005) and at All-Leps (as of 2009).

If treated as a valid genus, it contains the following species:

- Sunira bicolorago (Guenée, 1852)
- Sunira decipiens (Grote, 1881)
- Sunira verberata (Smith, 1904)
