= Brick (disambiguation) =

A brick is an artificial stone made by forming clay into hardened rectangular blocks.

Brick, Bricks, The Bricks or BRICKS may also refer to:

== Arts and entertainment ==
=== Music ===
==== Bands ====
- Brick (band), an American band formed in 1972
- Bricks (band), a late 1980s lo-fi alternative band fronted by Mac McCaughan, of Superchunk

==== Albums and soundtracks ====
- Brick (Brick album), released in 1977
- Talking Heads, 2005 box set by American band Talking Heads colloquially known as Brick
- Bricks (album), by Benny Tipene, released in 2014
- Bricks, a 1975 album by Hello People
- The Brick: Bodega Chronicles, 2007 debut album by American rapper Joell Ortiz
- The Bricks (album), by Outsidaz, released in 2001
- Brick (soundtrack), the soundtrack to the 2005 film

==== Songs ====
- "Brick" (song), 1997 song by Ben Folds Five
- "Bricks", a song by Rise Against from The Sufferer & the Witness, 2006
- "Bricks", a deluxe edition track on the album The State vs. Radric Davis
- "Bricks", a 1988 song by Crimpshrine

=== Visual Arts ===
- The Brick (visual art space), a visual art space and museum in Los Angeles, California, USA
- Equivalent VIII, occasionally referred to as The Bricks, a sculpture by Carl Andre constructed in 1966

=== Fictional characters ===
- Brick (character), a DC Comics villain, enemy of Green Arrow
- Brick Bradford, the titular hero of a science fiction comic strip from 1933 to 1987
- Brick, in the Discworld novel Thud!
- Brick, a member of The Rowdyruff Boys, a group of characters in the animated series The Powerpuff Girls
- Brick the Berserker, from the video game Borderlands
- Dr. Brick Breeland, on the TV show Hart of Dixie, portrayed by Tim Matheson
- Brick Heck, on the TV show The Middle
- Brick McArthur, a character from Total Drama: Revenge of the Island
- Brick Pollitt, in the play Cat on a Hot Tin Roof and its film adaptations
- Brick Tamland, in the film Anchorman: The Legend of Ron Burgundy
- Brick, a rat from the game Pizza Tower
- Brick, a character on General Hospital, portrayed by Stephen A. Smith

=== Other arts and entertainment ===
- Brick (film), a 2005 American neo-noir thriller
- Brick (2025 film), a 2025 German thriller
- Brick (magazine), a literary magazine established in 1977
- The Brick Theater, Williamsburg, Brooklyn, US

== Businesses ==
- The Brick, a Canadian furniture retailer
- Brick Brewing Company, a Canadian beer brewer
- The Brick, a bar in Roslyn, Washington, US, featured in the 1990s television series Northern Exposure
- Brick Academy, a school in New Jersey, US

== Places ==
- Brick Township, New Jersey, US
- Brick City or "The Bricks", nicknames for Newark, New Jersey, US

== Science and technology ==
- Brick (electronics), a nonfunctioning electronic device
- Brick game, an umbrella term for commonly cloned handheld electronic games
- Brick red, a color
- Brick (moth), a common name for the moth Agrochola circellaris
- Motorola DynaTAC, an early cellular phone commonly referred to as "the brick"
- BRICKS (software), a software framework for digital libraries

== Sports and games ==
- Brick (basketball), a slang term for a poor shot
- Brick, a poker term for a useless card
- Brick, a type of back-to-back triathlon workout involving two disciplines, most commonly cycling and running

== Other uses ==
- Brick (name), a list of people with the surname, given name or nickname
- Brick Lane, London, England
- Brick (keelboat), a French sailboat design
- Brick cheese, a surface-ripened cheese from Wisconsin, US
- El ladrillo (The Brick), a text on the Chilean economy

== See also ==
- Bric (disambiguation)
- Brico (disambiguation)
