= Bric =

Bric, BRIC, or BRICS may refer to:

- BRICS, an intergovernmental economic and political organization
- BRIC (economics term), an investment strategies grouping of four emerging economies
- British Rowing Indoor Championships, or BRIC, a British indoor rowing event
- Biotechnology Research and Innovation Council, or BRIC, an Indian research and development organisation
- Brics, Spain, a locality in Catalonia, Spain
- Brič, Slovenia, a settlement in Koper, Slovenia
- Brič, Croatia, a settlement in Buje, Croatia
- BRIC Arts Media, an American arts and media organization
- BRIC: The New World, a documentary series produced by journalist Jorge Lanata

== See also ==
- Brick (disambiguation)
- Brico (disambiguation)
