= Living memory =

Living memory may refer to:

- Living Memory (paintings), a series of paintings by Nabil Kanso
- A software application, see BRICKS (software)#Living Memory
