= Agrochola pulchella =

Scientific classification
- Domain: Eukaryota
- Kingdom: Animalia
- Phylum: Arthropoda
- Class: Insecta
- Order: Lepidoptera
- Superfamily: Noctuoidea
- Family: Noctuidae
- Tribe: Xylenini
- Subtribe: Xylenina
- Genus: Agrochola
- Species: A. pulchella

Binomial name
- Agrochola pulchella (Smith, 1900)

Species of moth

Agrochola pulchella is a species of cutworm or dart moth in the family Noctuidae.

The MONA or Hodges number for Agrochola pulchella is 9955.
