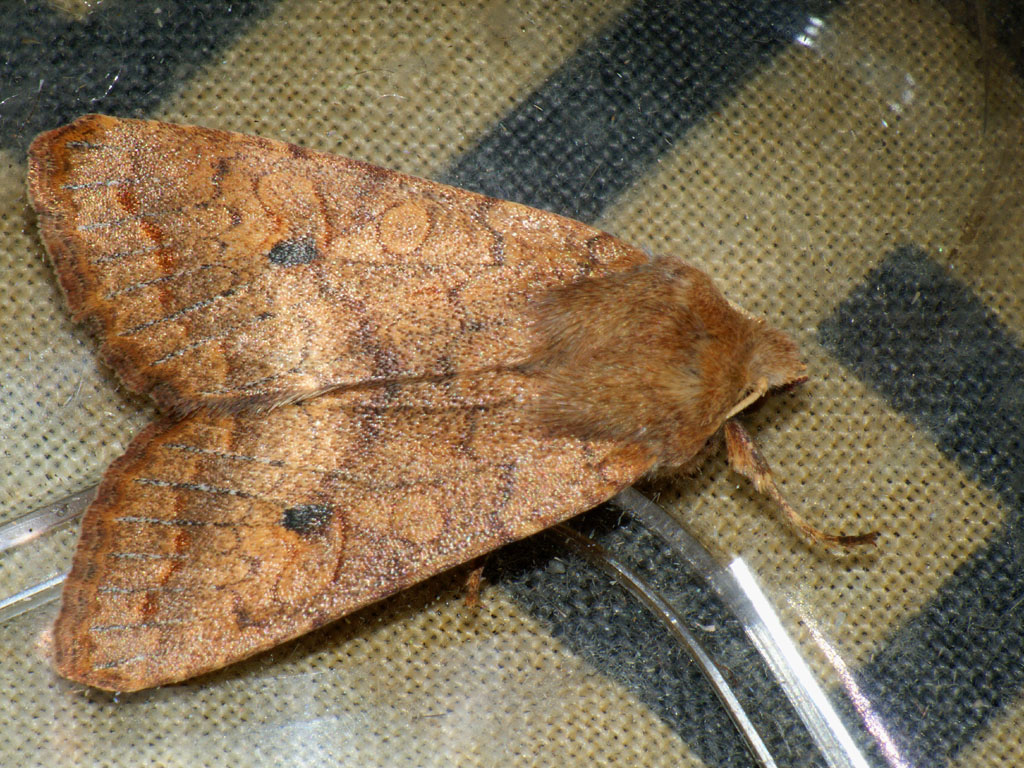

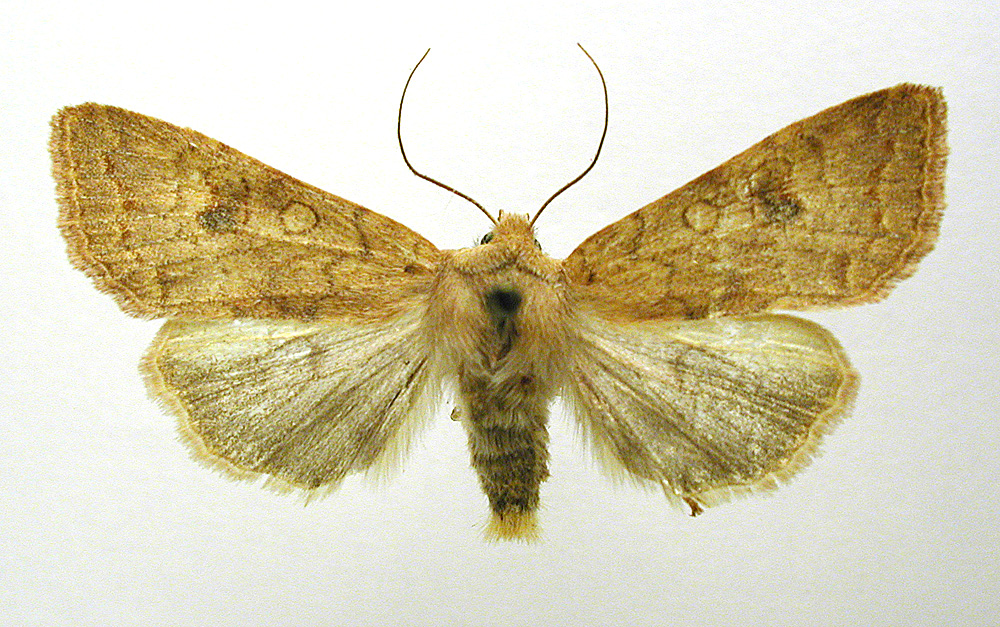

Scientific classification
- Domain: Eukaryota
- Kingdom: Animalia
- Phylum: Arthropoda
- Class: Insecta
- Order: Lepidoptera
- Superfamily: Noctuoidea
- Family: Noctuidae
- Genus: Agrochola
- Species: A. circellaris

Binomial name
- Agrochola circellaris (Hufnagel, 1766)

Synonyms
- Sunira circellaris (Hufnagel, 1766)

= Agrochola circellaris =

The Brick

Species of moth

Agrochola circellaris, or The Brick, is a species of moth of the family Noctuidae. The species was first described by Johann Siegfried Hufnagel in 1766. It is distributed throughout most of Europe, Asia Minor and Armenia.

This is a variable species, the forewings ranging from yellow to reddish brown and marked with paler stigmata and fascia. The most distinctive marking is a dark discal spot, with a diffuse dark band linking it to the costa. The hindwings are dirty grey with pale cream margins.

== Description ==
The wingspan is 34–44 mm. Forewing yellow ochreous or ferruginous, sometimes much dusted with fuscous; the lines and edges of stigmata rufous; the inner line waved, the outer lunulate-dentate; submarginal wavy, ochreous, with a rufous line inside it; lower part of reniform blackish; a small dark spot near base of wing; median shade generally present; hindwing grey, the costal area ochreous, the fringe rufous ochreous. The paler ochreous form is the type; the deep ferruginous examples are ferruginea Especially in Agrochola macilenta Hbn., the forewings are darkened by fuscous shading, especially along inner and outer margins; the hindwings are blackish grey; the ab. fusconervosa Petersen has all the nervures dark throughout; in nigridens Fuchs, a rare form, the cross lines are strongly black and dentate.

== Biology ==
This moth flies at night from August to October (Note: The flight season refers to the British Isles. This may vary in other parts of the range.) and will come to light but is more strongly attracted to some flowers and sugary foods.

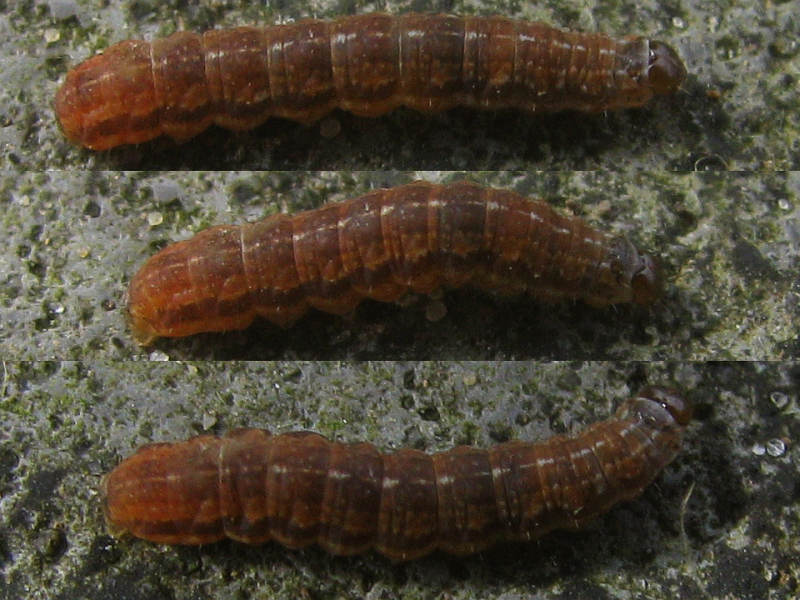
Larva

The larva usually feeds on wych elm, with a preference for the flowers and seeds, but has been recorded on other elms, ash, poplar, bird cherry and common osier. The larva is reddish brown, dotted with darker; dorsal line pale, passing through a series of V-shaped dark markings; a pale spiracular line with dark markings in a row above it. This species overwinters as an egg.
