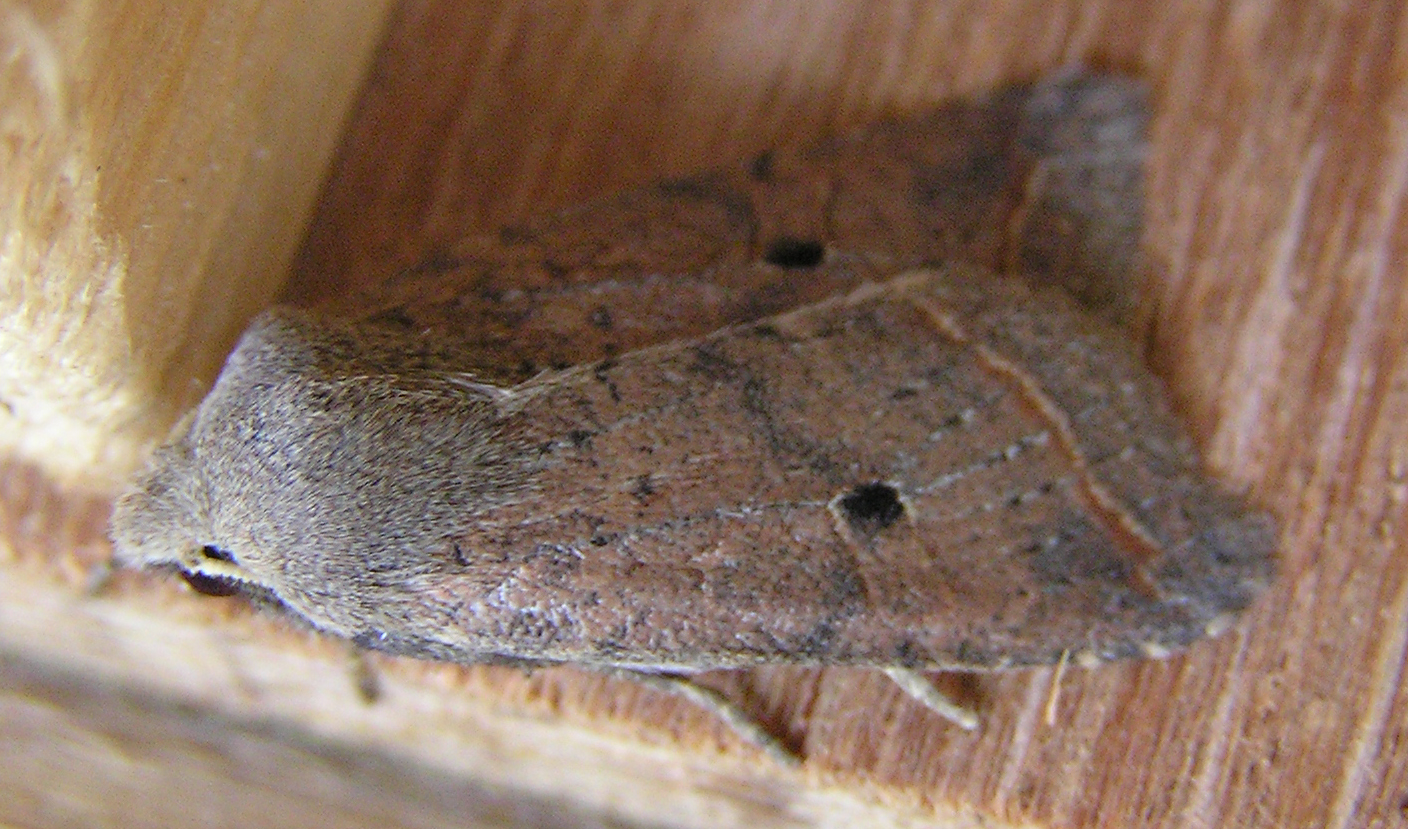
- Living
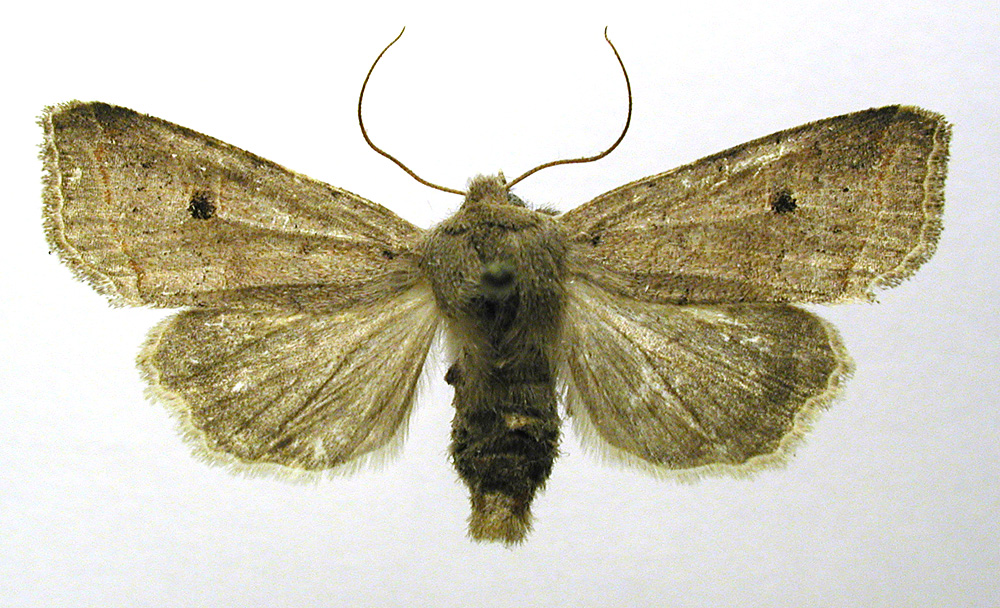
- Mounted

Scientific classification
- Domain: Eukaryota
- Kingdom: Animalia
- Phylum: Arthropoda
- Class: Insecta
- Order: Lepidoptera
- Superfamily: Noctuoidea
- Family: Noctuidae
- Genus: Agrochola
- Species: A. lota

Binomial name
- Agrochola lota (Clerck, 1759)

= Agrochola lota =

Red-line Quaker

Species of moth

Agrochola lota, the red-line Quaker, is a moth of the family Noctuidae. The species was first described by Carl Alexander Clerck in 1759. It is distributed throughout the whole of Europe except Scandinavia; in Armenia, Asia Minor, and east across the Palearctic to the Altai Mountains and western Siberia.It was introduced to Newfoundland. In the Alps, it rises at altitudes of just over 1500 metres.

== Description ==
Forewing grey brown or leaden grey, often with a reddish tinge; inner and outer lines double, conversely lunulate-dentate, but rarely visible; a thick dark median shade; stigmata grey, with pinkish annuli edged with rufous, the lower half of reniform black; submarginal line nearly straight but angled on vein 7, pale with rufous inward edging; hindwing dark grey, with cell spot and submarginal cloud showing darker; the reddish examples in which the grey tints have entirely given place to rufous, form the ab. rufa Tutt; in rare cases the grey is darkened into black; this is ab. suffusa Tutt from Ireland; an equally rare form from England, in which the ground colour is whitish grey is pallida Tutt; in a form from Amasia, ab. subdita ab. nov. [Warren] the grey ground is duller and paler in both wings, and the black in lower lobe of reniform is much reduced. The spherical egg is initially yellowish white and turns dark reddish-brown before hatching. It is covered with strongly curled longitudinal ribs. Young larvae are bluish grey, fully grown they are grey to grey-brown and finely blackened. The underside is whitish grey to ochre. Dorsal and dorsolateral lines are white and partly slightly interrupted, the many white point warts are framed in black. The pupa has four curved thorns on the wide, short cremaster. The Asian sister species Agrochola plumbea (Wiltshire, 1941) can only be distinguished by means of a genital morphological examination.

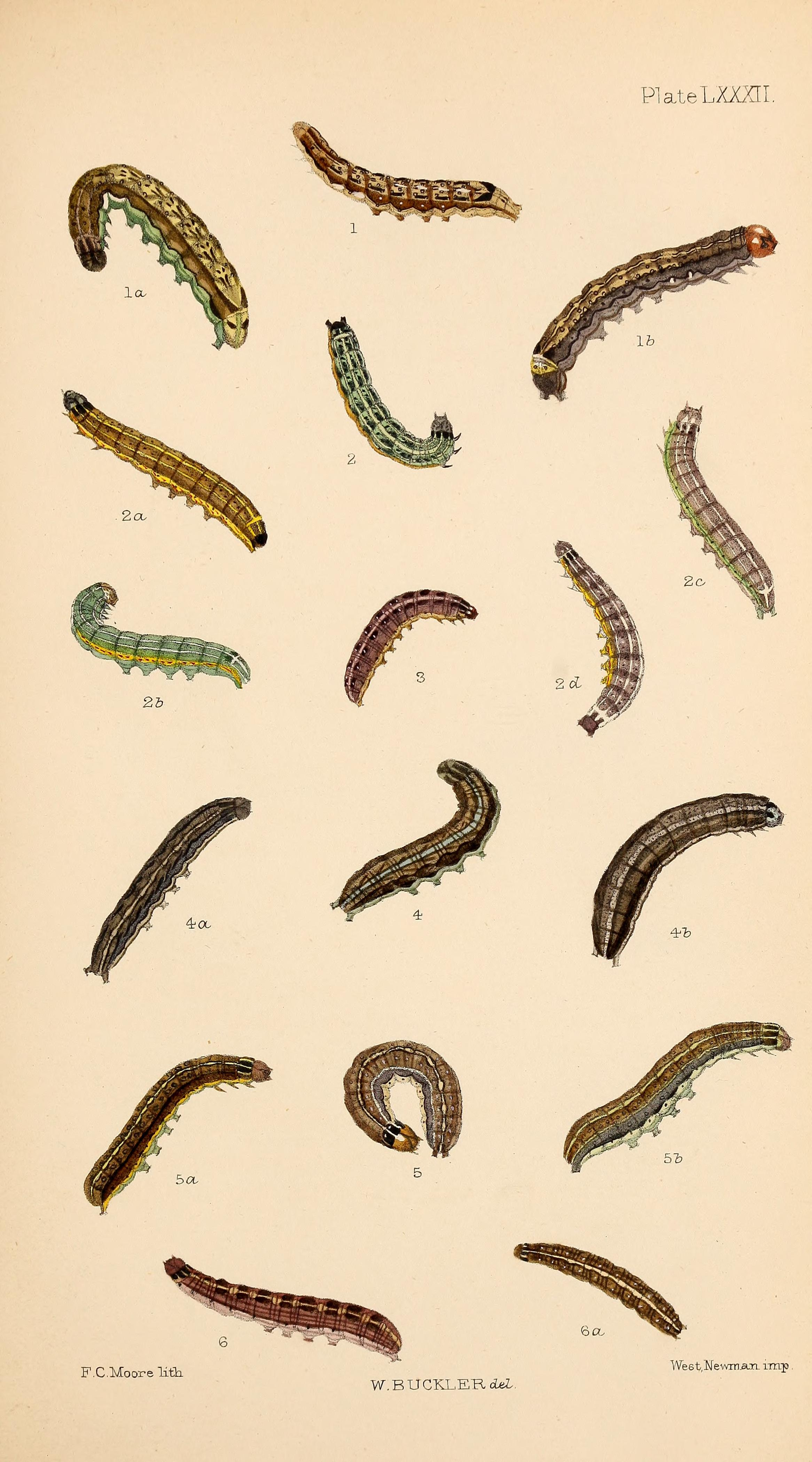
Figs 5, 5a, 5 b larvae after final moult

A. lota is mainly found in humid habitats such as shores, floodplains, clearings, bogs and wet meadows.

The moth flies from September to October and is attracted to light.

The young caterpillars feed on the catkins of sallow and willow (Salix), progressing to eating leaves when mature. They hide in spun leaves by day and feed at night.

== Gallery ==
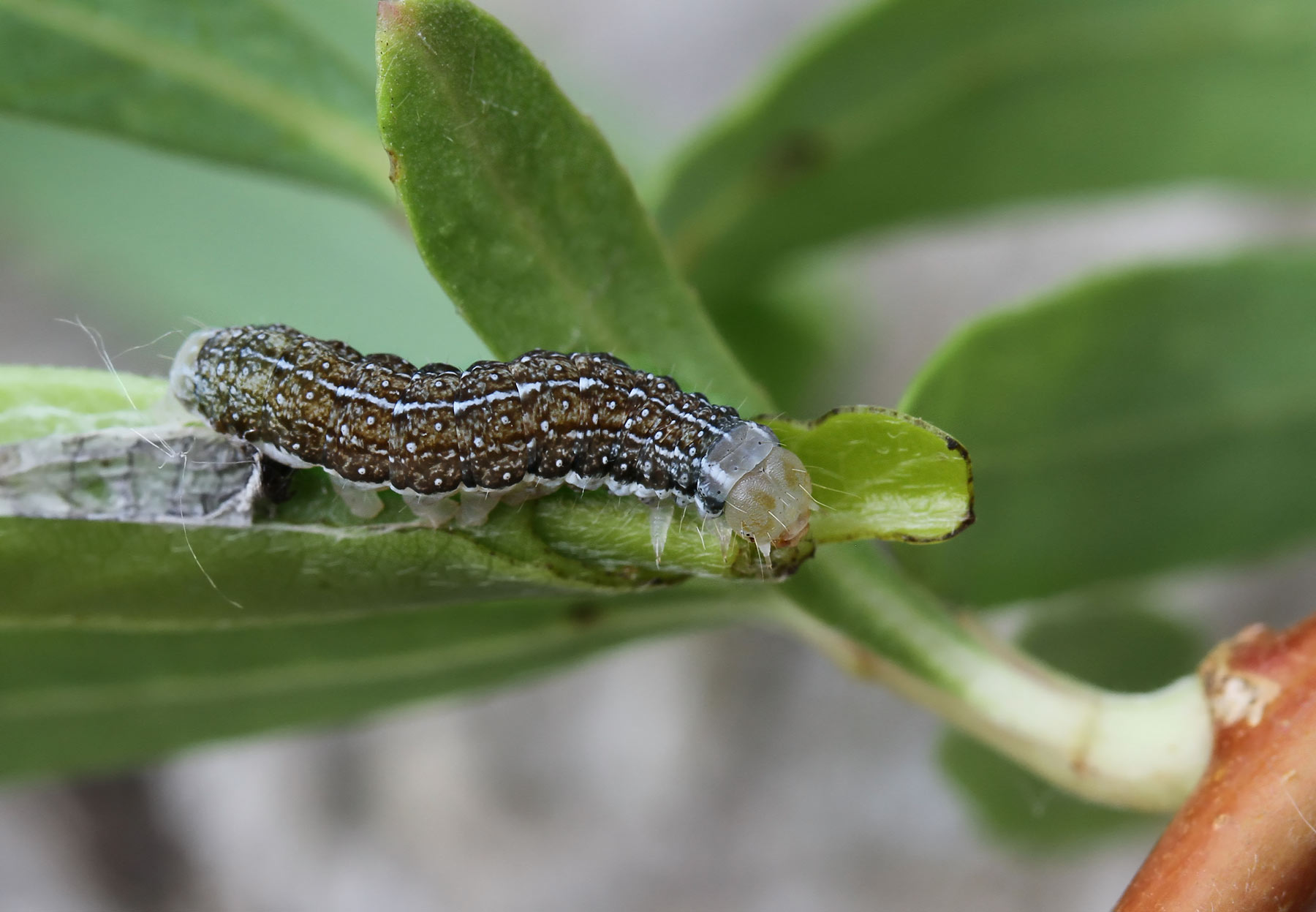
Larva

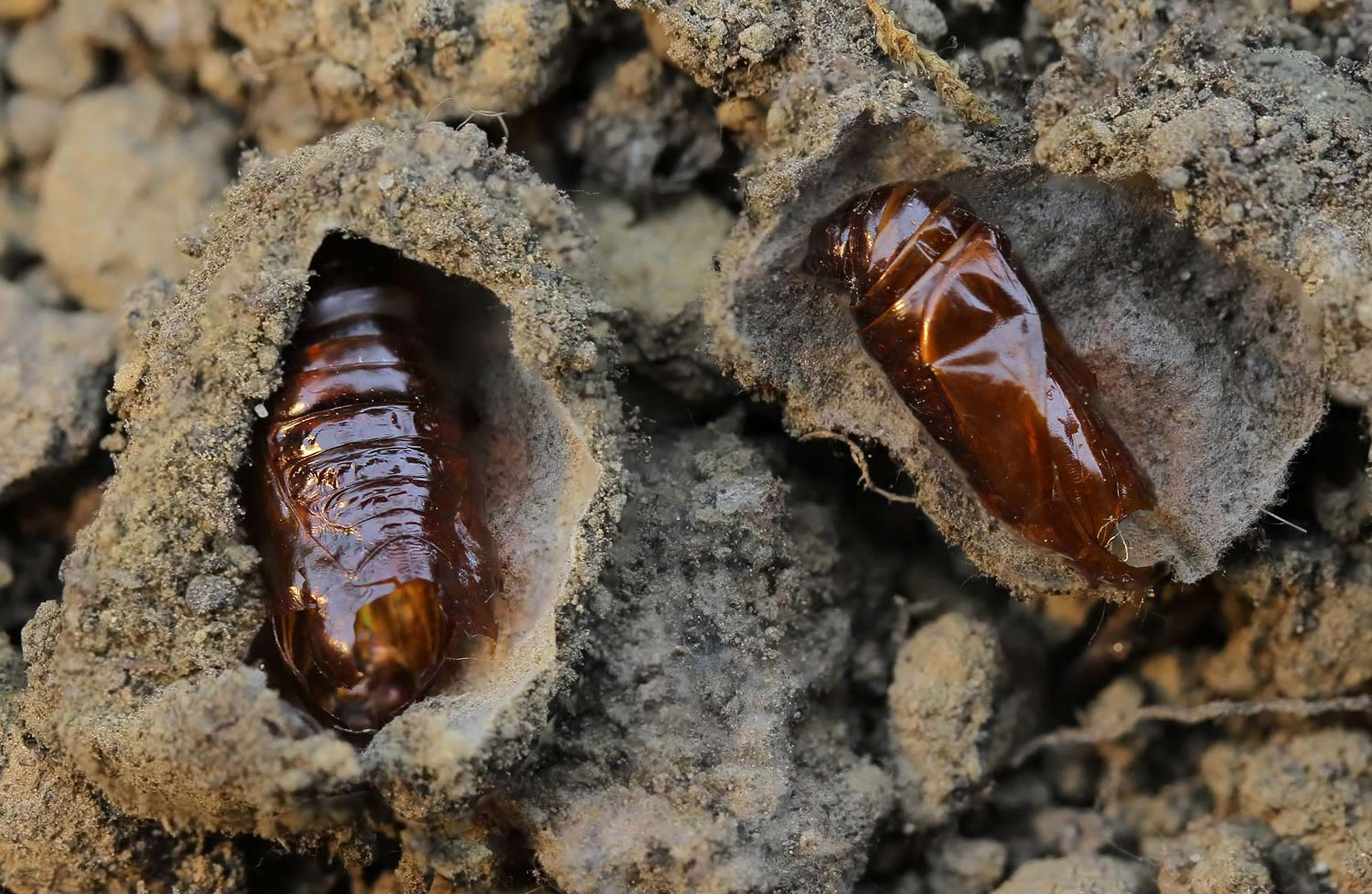
Pupae

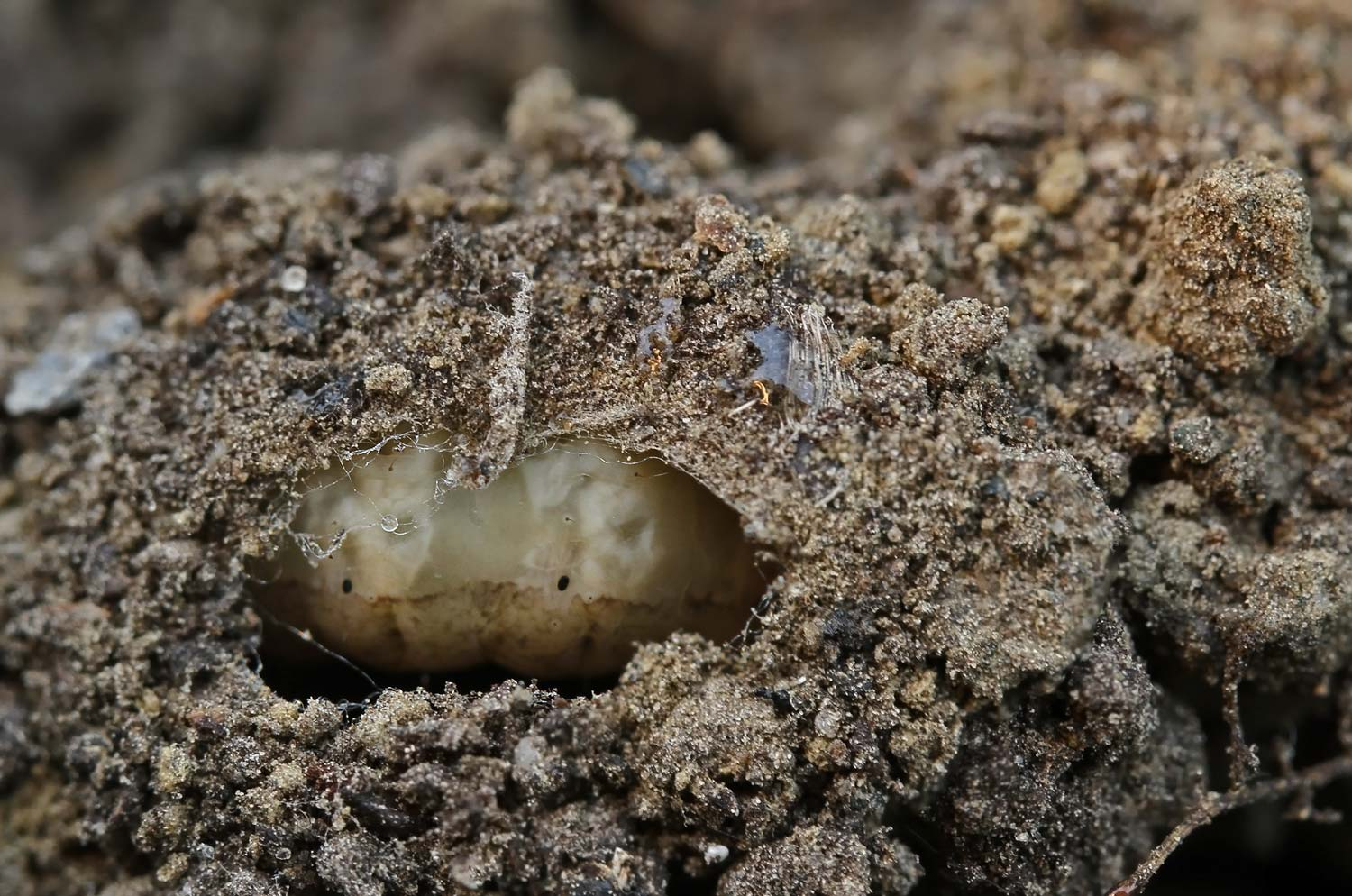
Pupa and cocoon

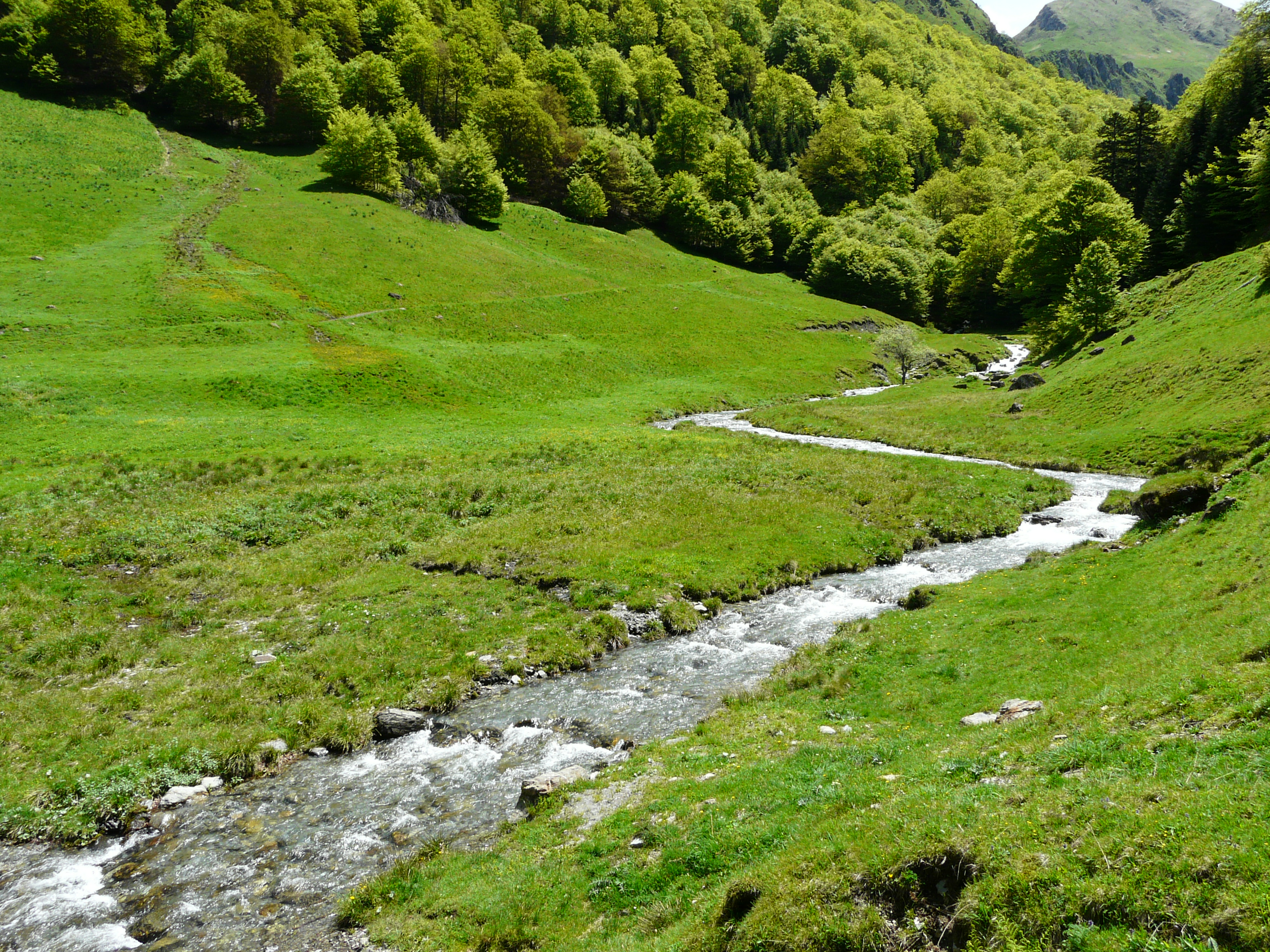
Habitat, France
