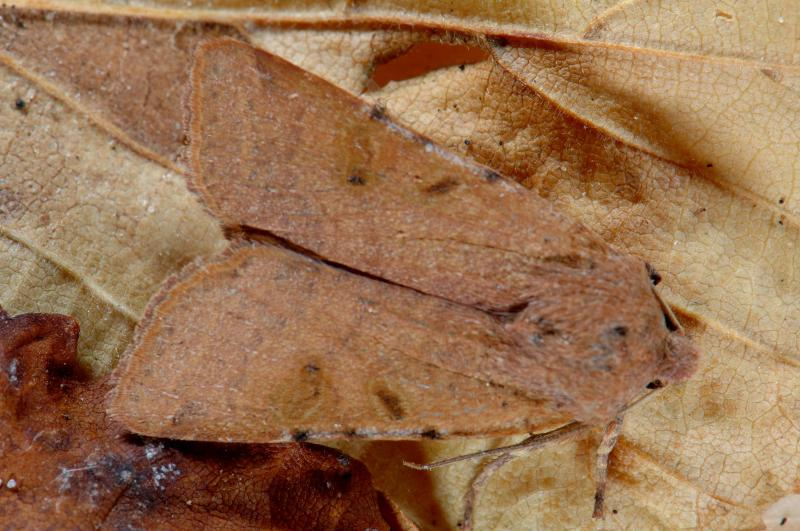

Scientific classification
- Domain: Eukaryota
- Kingdom: Animalia
- Phylum: Arthropoda
- Class: Insecta
- Order: Lepidoptera
- Superfamily: Noctuoidea
- Family: Noctuidae
- Genus: Agrochola
- Species: A. lychnidis

Binomial name
- Agrochola lychnidis (Denis & Schiffermüller, 1775)

= Agrochola lychnidis =

Species of moth

Agrochola lychnidis, the beaded chestnut, is a moth of the family Noctuidae. The species was first described by Michael Denis and Ignaz Schiffermüller in 1775. It is distributed throughout the whole of Europe from Ireland to the Urals. It also occurs in western North Africa and Asia Minor.

The wingspan is 30–35 mm. Forewing bright rufous or reddish ochreous with the veins paler, often dusted with darker; inner and outer lines double, dark, with the centre rufous, often very faint, but always marked by black spots on costa; submarginal line preceded by a row of dark lunules between the veins and by a dark bar at costa; median shade distinct; stigmata blackish, distinct, especially the narrow oblique orbicular; hindwing dark grey, the fringe rufous. This species varies in colour exceedingly; the brighter rufous specimens, with pale veins, represent typical lychnidis F.; the duller brownish forms, also with pale veins, are pistacina F.; - rubetra Esper the bright rufous unicolorous form with all markings indistinct, and the costal edge often conspicuously white at middle, of which ferrea Haw. is an offshoot, having only the 4 costal blotches and the stigmata dark; the paler, reddish ochreous, unicolorous form is obsoleta Tutt; of the forms without red colouring, serina Esp. has the markings plain, while in pallida Tutt they are obscure, the ground colour being greyish ochreous or yellowish;of the brownish rufous or brownish grey forms, brunnea Tutt is a more sombre form than pistacina without pale nervures; canaria Esp. is a form in which the lines and veins and edges of the stigmata are dull fulvous and the ground colour blackish, as a rule much darker in the male than in the female; dark specimens like these also occur but with the light shades only dull brown and the dark interspaces not so black; caerulescens Calb. from Italy, is a bluish or lilac grey insect; this form also occurs in Asia Minor; a large number of examples from Amasia, especially females, agree exactly, while the rest, mainly males become greyish luteous, as in serina, with the markings varying in intensity". When newly laid the egg is yellowish, but changes to olive-brown. The larva is green inclining to yellowish, freckled with greyish, and dotted with whitish; there are three fine whitish lines along the dorsum, and a broad white lateral stripe .

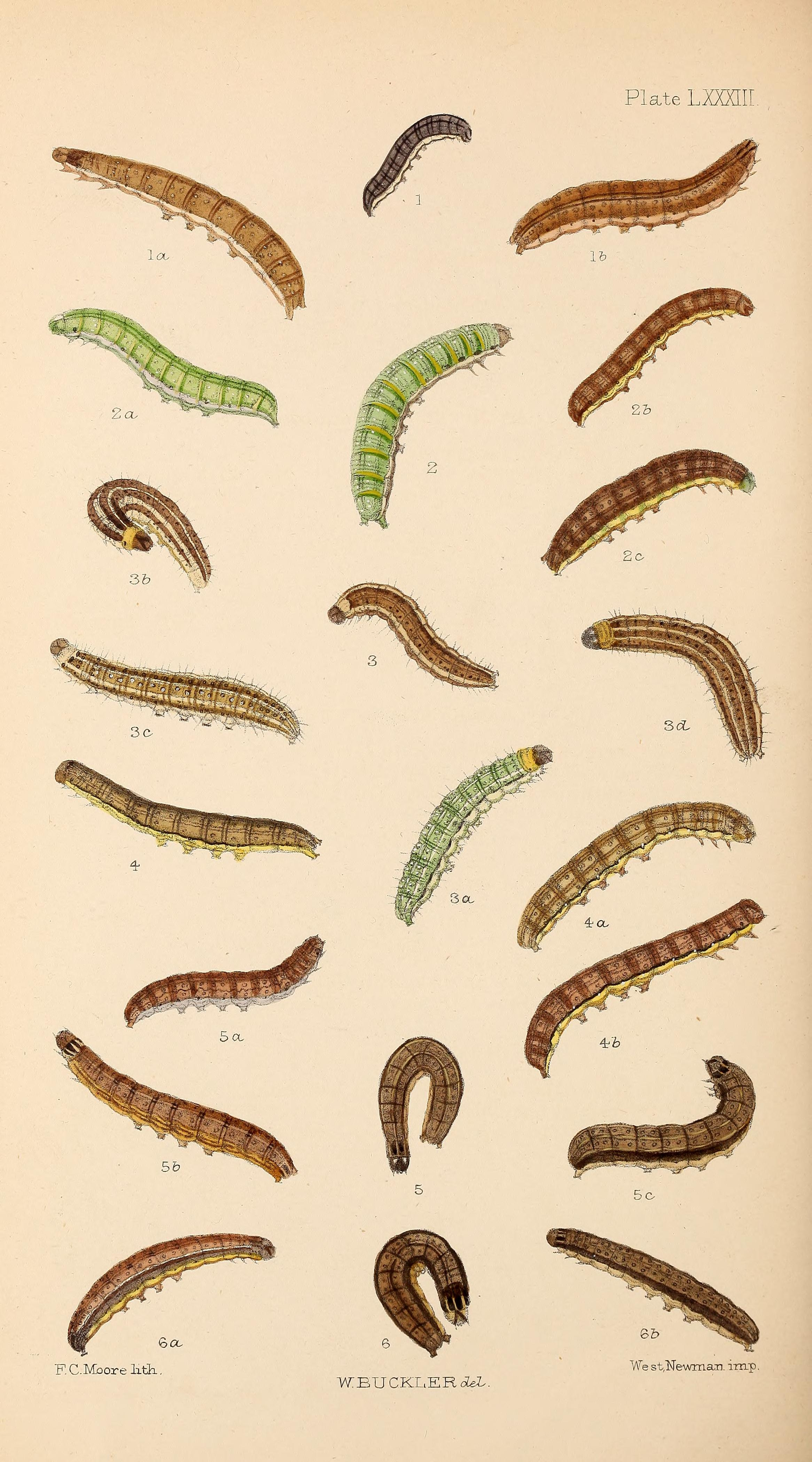
2, 2a, 2b, 2c larvae in various stages

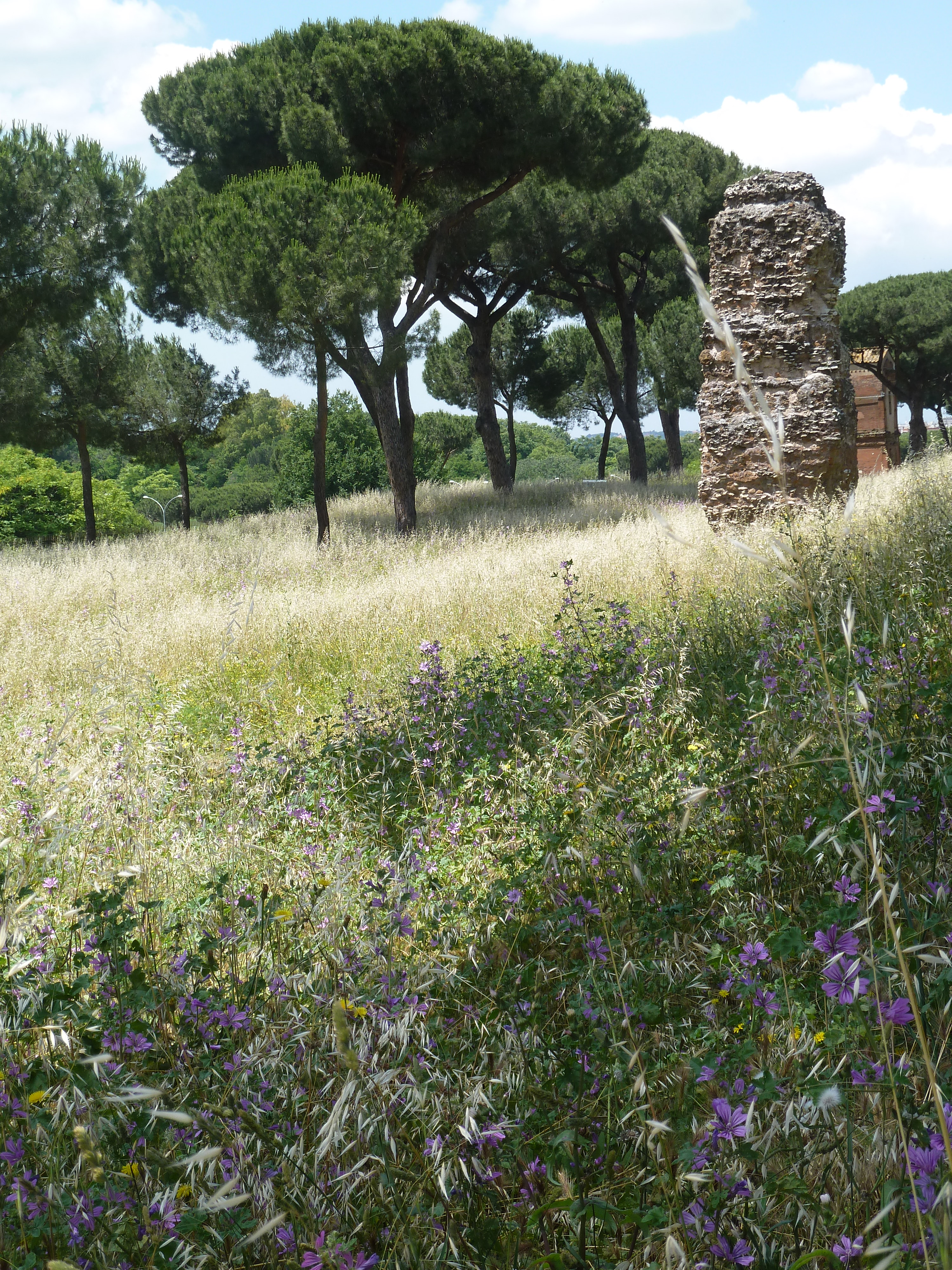
Habitat, Rome, Italy

== Biology ==
Agrochola lychnidis inhabits grasslands, pastures, forest edges, embankments, clearcuttings and occurs occasionally also in human settlements (gardens). The larvae are polyphagous feeding on low plants when small, later consuming the leaves of various trees and shrubs (Prunus, Salix, Achillea, Ranunculus etc.).

The moths fly in September and October.
