= El Pi de Sant Just =

- Locality
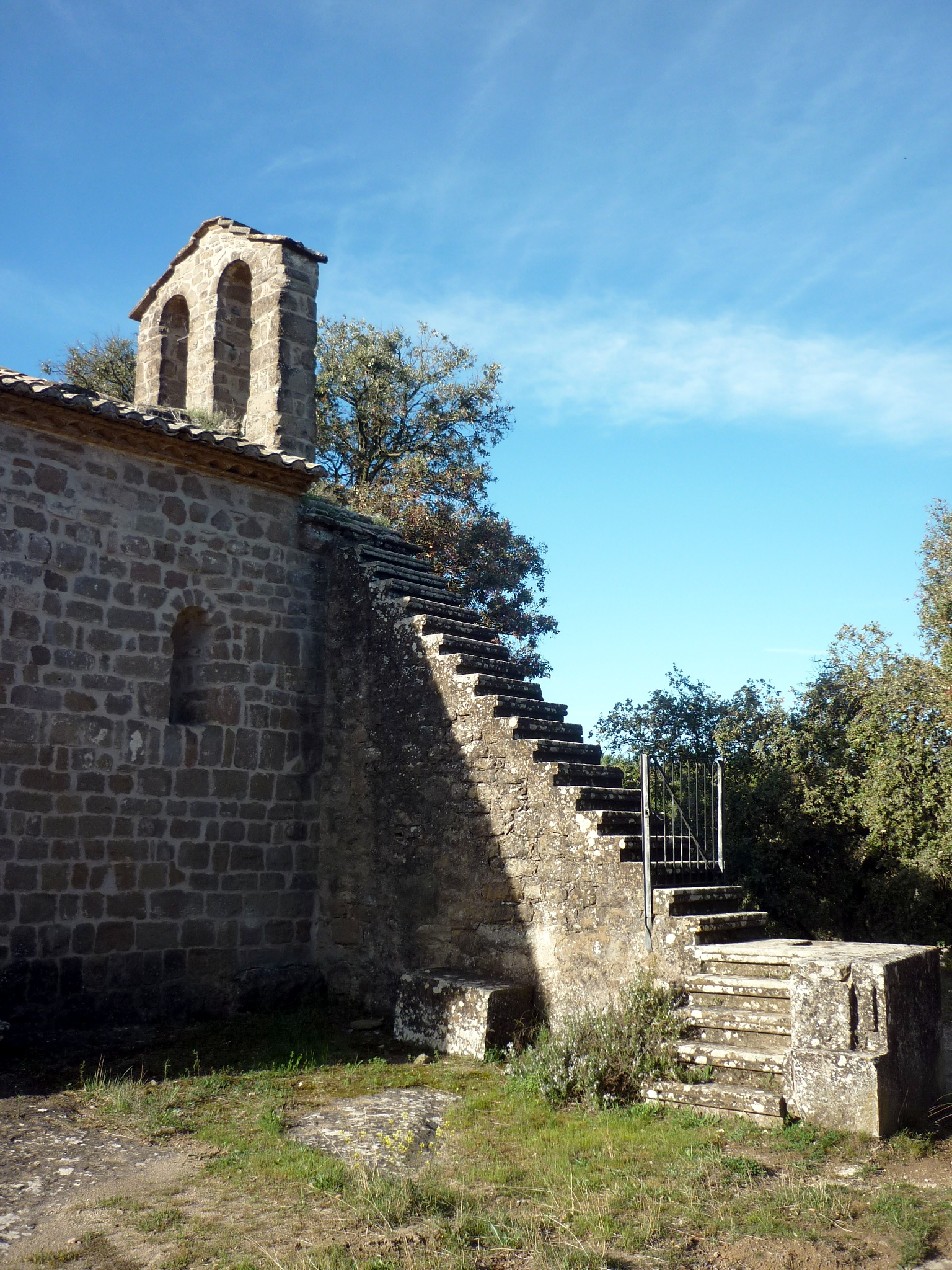

- Location within Province of Lleida Location within Catalonia Location within Spain
- Coordinates: 41°58′40″N 1°33′18″E
- Country: Spain
- Community: Catalonia
- Province: Lleida
- Municipality: Olius
- Elevation: 713 m (2,339 ft)

Population
  - Total: 782

El Pi de Sant Just is a locality situated in the municipality of Olius, Province of Lleida province, Catalonia, Spain. As of 2020, it has a population of 782.

== Geography ==
El Pi de Sant Just is located 112 km east-northeast of Lleida.
