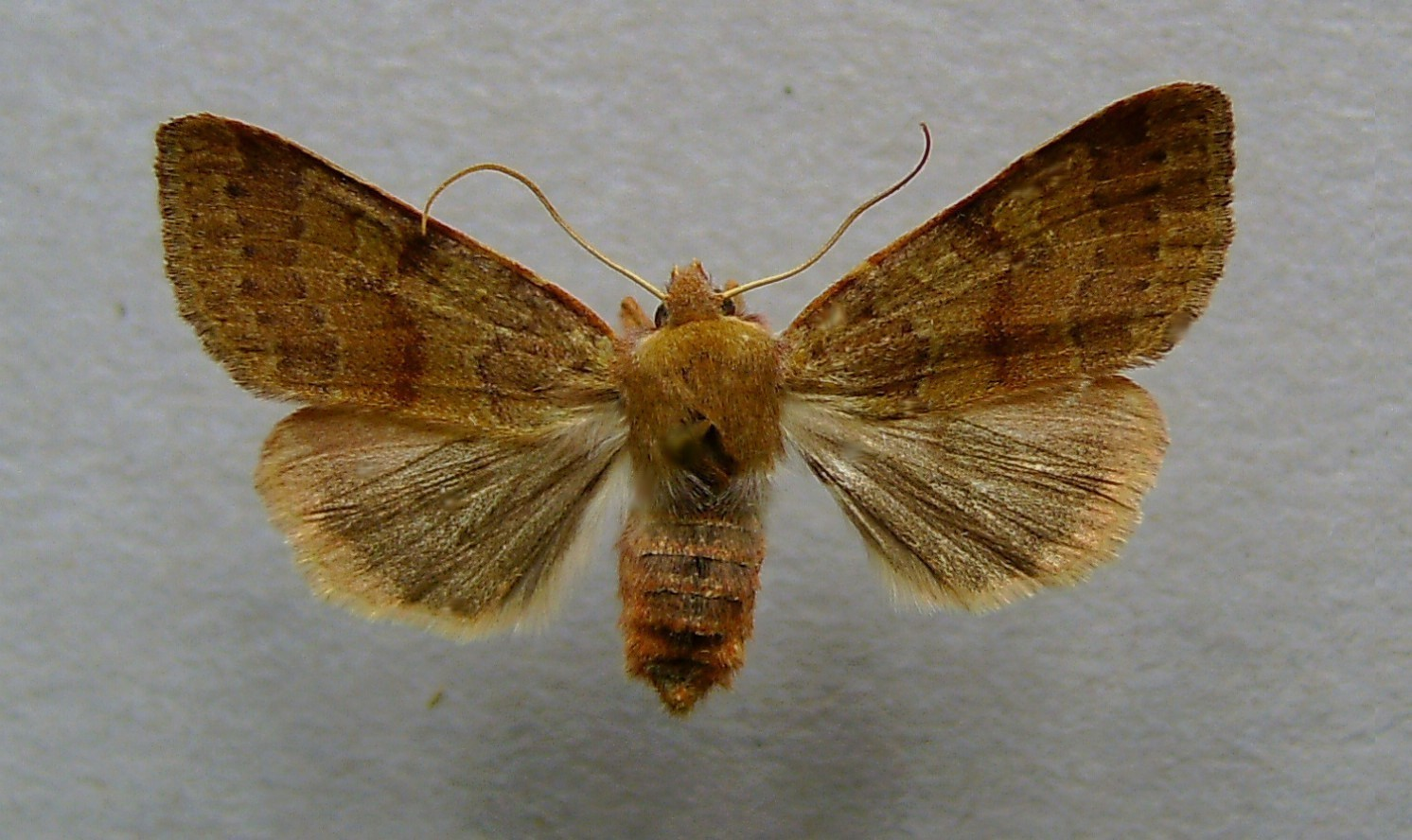

Scientific classification
- Kingdom: Animalia
- Phylum: Arthropoda
- Class: Insecta
- Order: Lepidoptera
- Superfamily: Noctuoidea
- Family: Noctuidae
- Genus: Agrochola
- Species: A. helvola

Binomial name
- Agrochola helvola (Linnaeus, 1758)

Synonyms
- Phalaena (Bombyx) helvola Linnaeus, 1758; Phalaena (Bombyx) rufina Linnaeus, 1758; Phalaena fulvago Clerck, 1759; Phalaena (Noctua) emmedonia Cramer, [1779]; Phalaena (Noctua) catenata Esper, 1788; Phalaena (Noctua) punica Borkhausen, 1792

= Agrochola helvola =

Flounced chestnut

Species of moth

Agrochola helvola, the flounced chestnut, is a moth of the family Noctuidae. It was first described by Carl Linnaeus in his landmark 1758 10th edition of Systema Naturae. The species is found in most of Europe, north to Scotland and Fennoscandia up to the Arctic Circle, south to Spain, Sicily (it is not found on Sardinia), Greece further east to the Middle East, Armenia, Asia Minor, western Turkestan and central Asia up to central Siberia.

The wingspan is 34–45 mm. The colour of its forewing is either dull or bright red with inner, outer, and submarginal lines brownish, formed of lunules between the veins, those of the inner line more continuous; a distinct brownish angulated median shade. Its stigmata is usually very indistinct, of the ground colour or slightly darker, with paler annuli. Its hindwing is grey, with costal and terminal areas and the fringe generally ochreous or rufous. The basal area before inner line and the space between outer and submarginal lines are darker, forming more or less prominent bands.

The dull reddish examples with these bands well-developed are typical helvola; the bright red ones are rufina L.; — catenata Esp. is a moth in which the space between the outer and submarginal lines is not filled up with darker colours, so that the dark lunules forming those lines are more conspicuous; the examples with a greenish grey or ochreous ground colour, with the bands also developed are ab. ochrea Tutt; — those with a yellowish ground and purplish-brown bands are punica Bkh. The lines and bands are often obscured and semiobsolete. These less-marked forms with dull reddish ground colour are unicolor; — with bright reddish ground colour called rufa Tutt; — and with greenish ochreous ground colour called extincta Spul.; sibirica Stgr. from Central Asia, has pale yellow forewings; cinnamomea Fuchs has much grey suffusion, the area beyond outer line has darker brown; specimens from Amasia, though reddish in a few cases, mostly females, are generally much paler than European, dull brownish or ochreous-grey, with indistinct or obsolete markings; in particular the hindwings are much whiter with the grey and rufous suffusion usually slighter and more restricted in area. The egg is initially reddish yellow becoming, before hatching, a reddish-light-brown hue showing white spots and a yellowish egg base. The caterpillars are coloured yellow-brown or red-brown, have thin, white dorsal and dorsolateral lines and wide, white, sharply limited lateral stripes as well as whitish point warts. The pupa has two fine bristles on the cremaster.

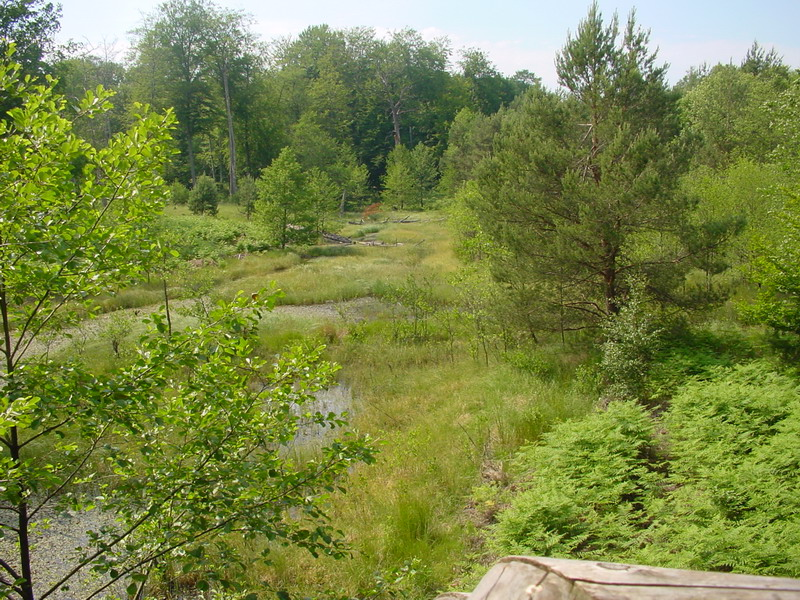
Habitat. Germany

Agrochola helvola has a wide habitat range from xerothermic grasslands over mesophilic edges to fens, stream margins and other unimproved habitats. The moth flies from September to October depending on the location.

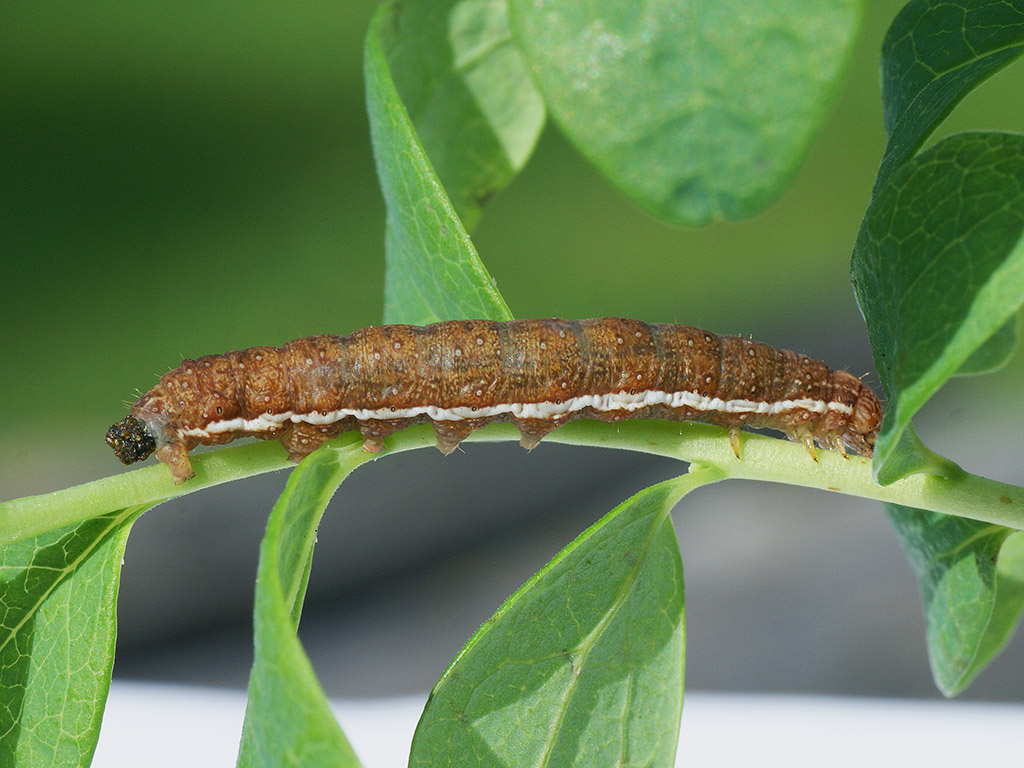
larva

The larvae feed on the leaves of various plants. Recorded food plants include Salix, Quercus, Corylus, Prunus spinosa, Rubus fruticosus, Rubus idaeus and Vaccinium myrtillus.
