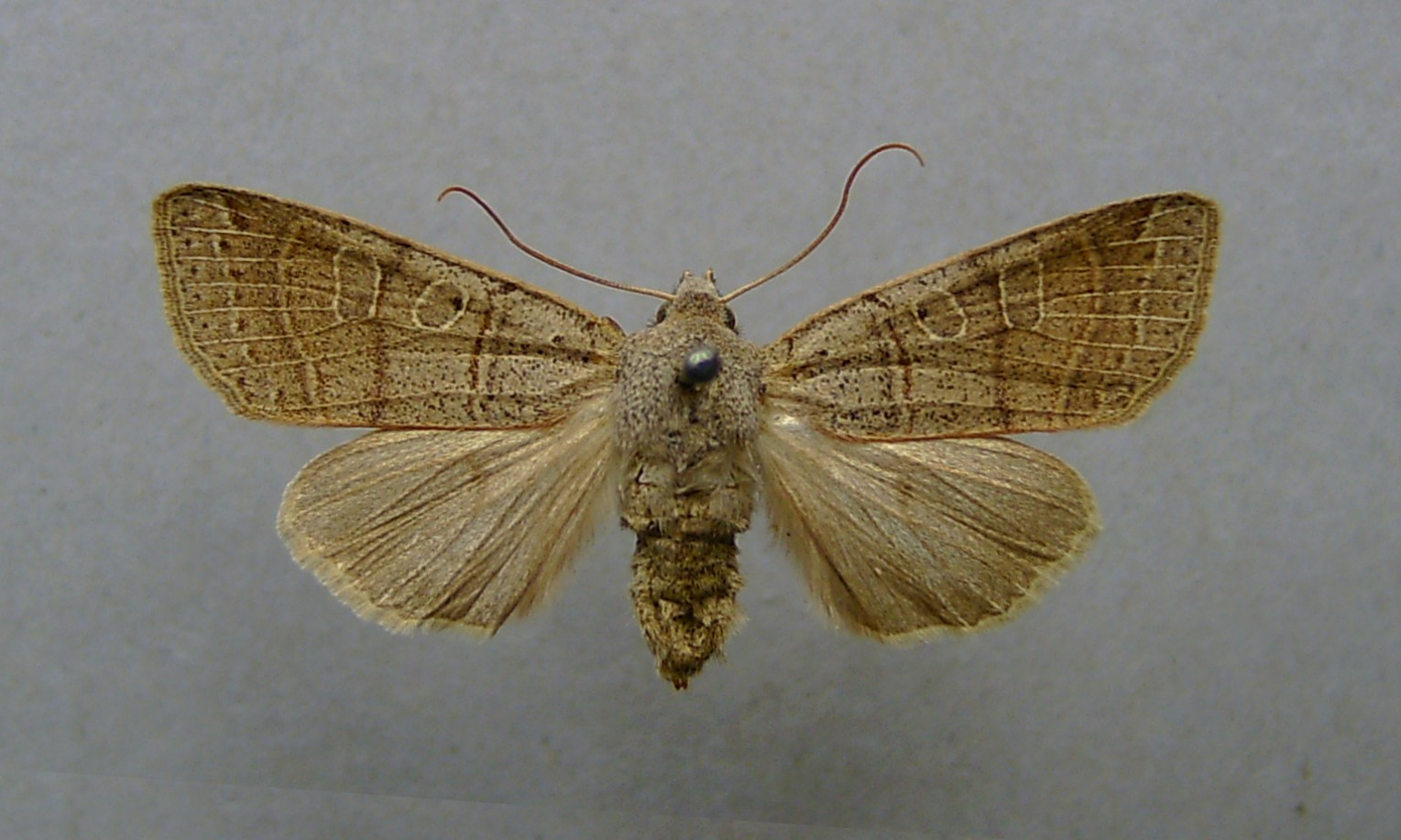

Scientific classification
- Kingdom: Animalia
- Phylum: Arthropoda
- Clade: Pancrustacea
- Class: Insecta
- Order: Lepidoptera
- Superfamily: Noctuoidea
- Family: Noctuidae
- Genus: Agrochola
- Species: A. humilis

Binomial name
- Agrochola humilis (Denis & Schiffermüller, 1775)

Synonyms
- Noctua humilis Denis & Schiffermuller, 1775; Agrochola anatolica Pinker, 1980

= Agrochola humilis =

Species of moth

Agrochola humilis is a species of moth in the family Noctuidae. It is found in parts of central and southern Europe and Asia Minor.

The wingspan is 30–40 mm. Forewings are long and narrow. Ground color is pale brown, ash grey or olive-grey. Ante- and postmedial-lines are double, nearly straight, subterminal line ochreous, frequently interrupted with dark spots. Veins are clearly visible, orbicular and reniform stigmata large, pale beige-brown encircled. Hindwings are pale ochreous grey, mostly showing a dark discal spot.

The moth flies from September to October preferably in dry oakwoods. They are strongly attracted to artificial light and sugar bait. The egg overwinters.

The larvae feed on the leaves of various plants. Recorded food plants include Fraxinus, Salix, Ulmus, Taraxacum and Plantago.

== Subspecies ==
- Agrochola humilis humilis
- Agrochola humilis anatolica Pinker, 1980 (Turkey)
