= El Castellvell =

Castellvell
- Locality
- El Castellvell
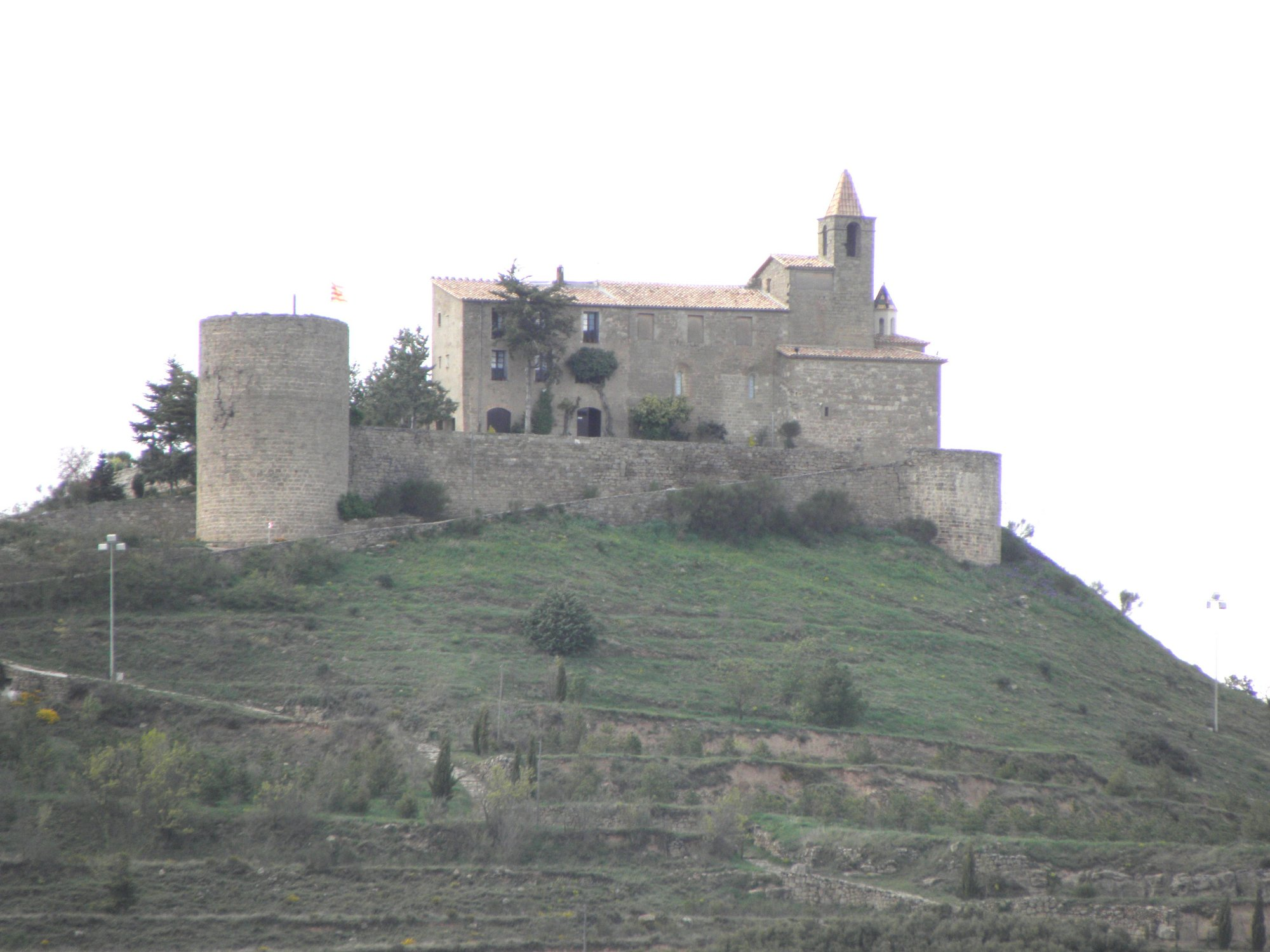

- Location within Province of Lleida Location within Catalonia Location within Spain
- Coordinates: 41°59′39″N 1°30′5″E
- Country: Spain
- Community: Catalonia
- Province: Lleida
- Municipality: Olius
- Elevation: 833 m (2,733 ft)

Population
  - Total: 37

Castellvell or El Castellvell is a locality located in the municipality of Olius, in Province of Lleida province, Catalonia, Spain. As of 2020, it has a population of 37.

== Geography ==
Castellvell is located 111km east-northeast of Lleida.
