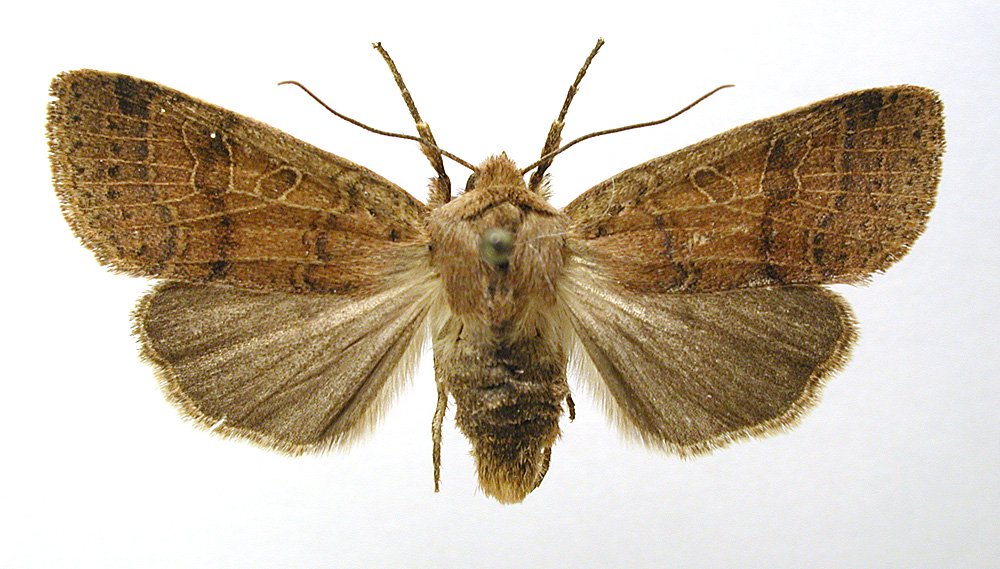

Scientific classification
- Domain: Eukaryota
- Kingdom: Animalia
- Phylum: Arthropoda
- Class: Insecta
- Order: Lepidoptera
- Superfamily: Noctuoidea
- Family: Noctuidae
- Genus: Agrochola
- Species: A. nitida

Binomial name
- Agrochola nitida (Denis & Schiffermüller, 1775)

Synonyms
- Noctua nitida Denis & Schiffermüller, 1775; Orthosia insueta Freyer, 1838

= Agrochola nitida =

Species of moth

Agrochola nitida is a moth of the family Noctuidae. It is found in most of Europe, except Great Britain, Ireland, and the Iberian Peninsula.

The wingspan is about 30–38 mm. Adults are on wing from mid August to October. There is one generation per year.

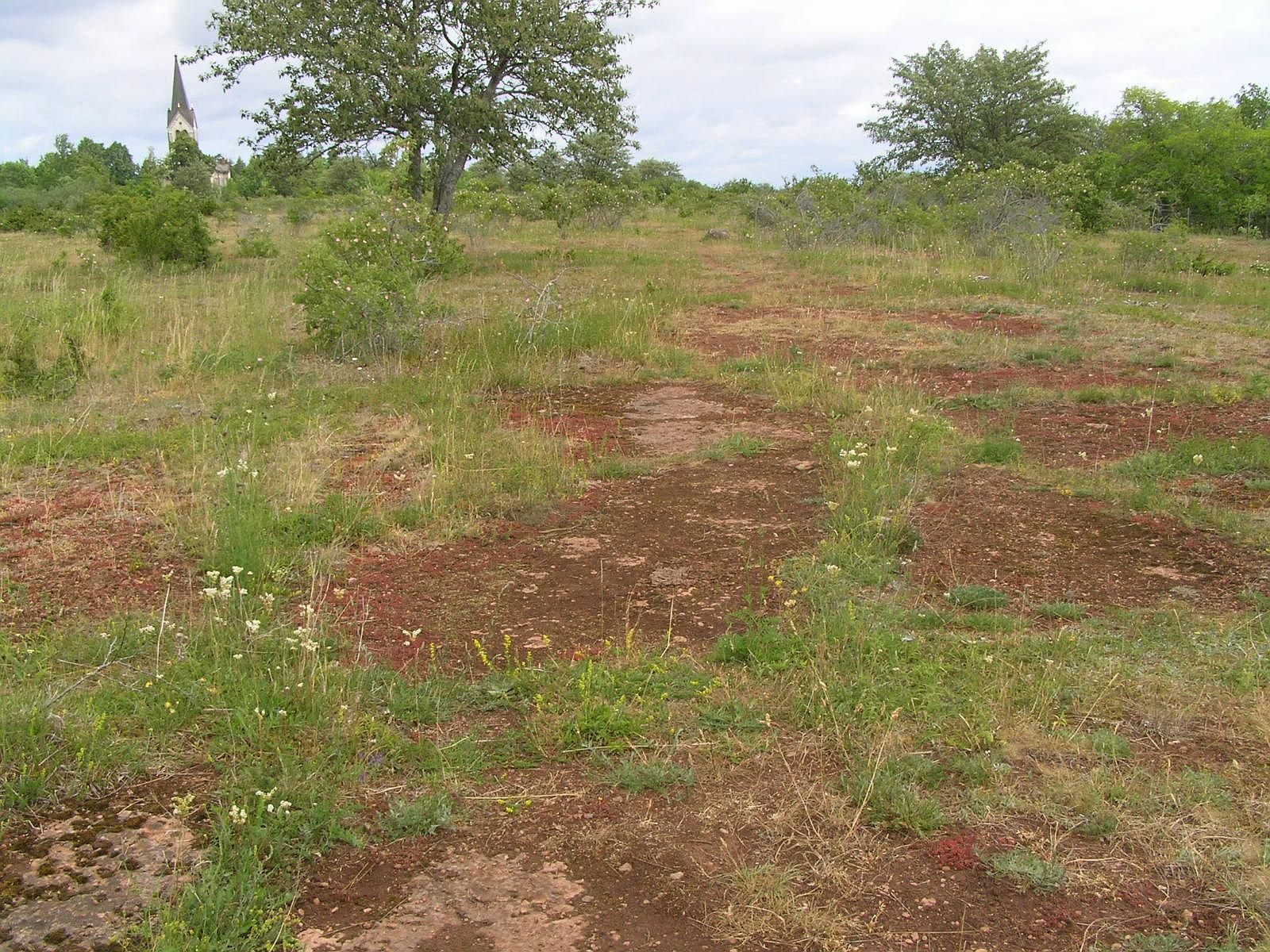
Habitat, Sweden

The larvae feed on Galium, Plantago, Primula, Rumex, and Veronica species.
