= Brics, Spain =

Brics
- Locality
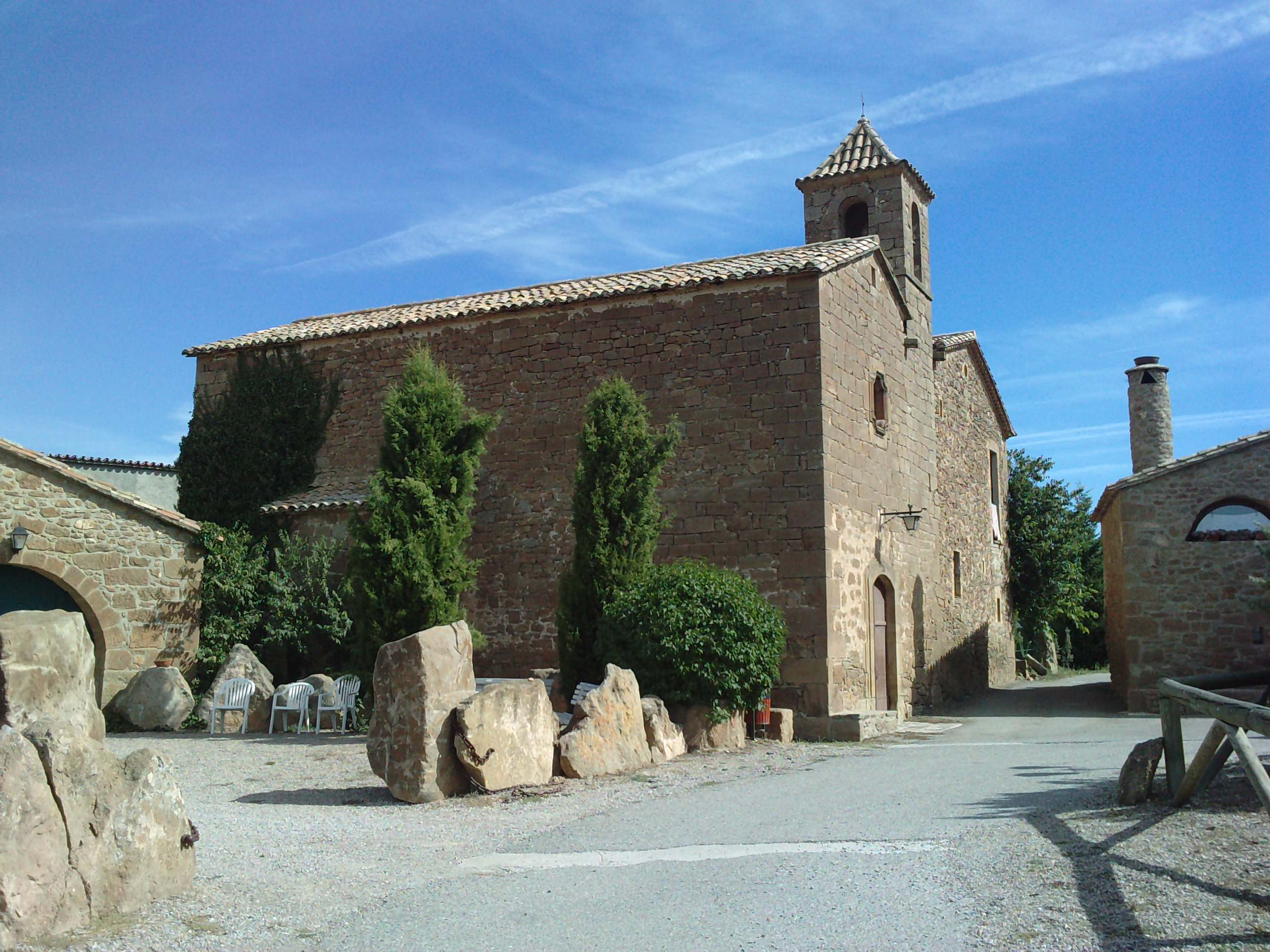

- Location within Province of Lleida Location within Catalonia Location within Spain
- Coordinates: 41°56′52″N 1°30′43″E
- Country: Spain
- Community: Catalonia
- Province: Lleida
- Municipality: Olius
- Elevation: 784 m (2,572 ft)

Population
  - Total: 53

Brics is a locality located in the municipality of Olius, in Province of Lleida province, Catalonia, Spain. As of 2020, it has a population of 53.

== Geography ==
Brics is located 105km east-northeast of Lleida.
