= Agrochola purpurea =

Scientific classification
- Kingdom: Animalia
- Phylum: Arthropoda
- Clade: Pancrustacea
- Class: Insecta
- Order: Lepidoptera
- Superfamily: Noctuoidea
- Family: Noctuidae
- Tribe: Xylenini
- Subtribe: Xylenina
- Genus: Agrochola
- Species: A. purpurea

Binomial name
- Agrochola purpurea (Grote, 1874)

Species of moth

Agrochola purpurea is a species of cutworm or dart moth in the family Noctuidae.

The MONA or Hodges number for Agrochola purpurea is 9954.
