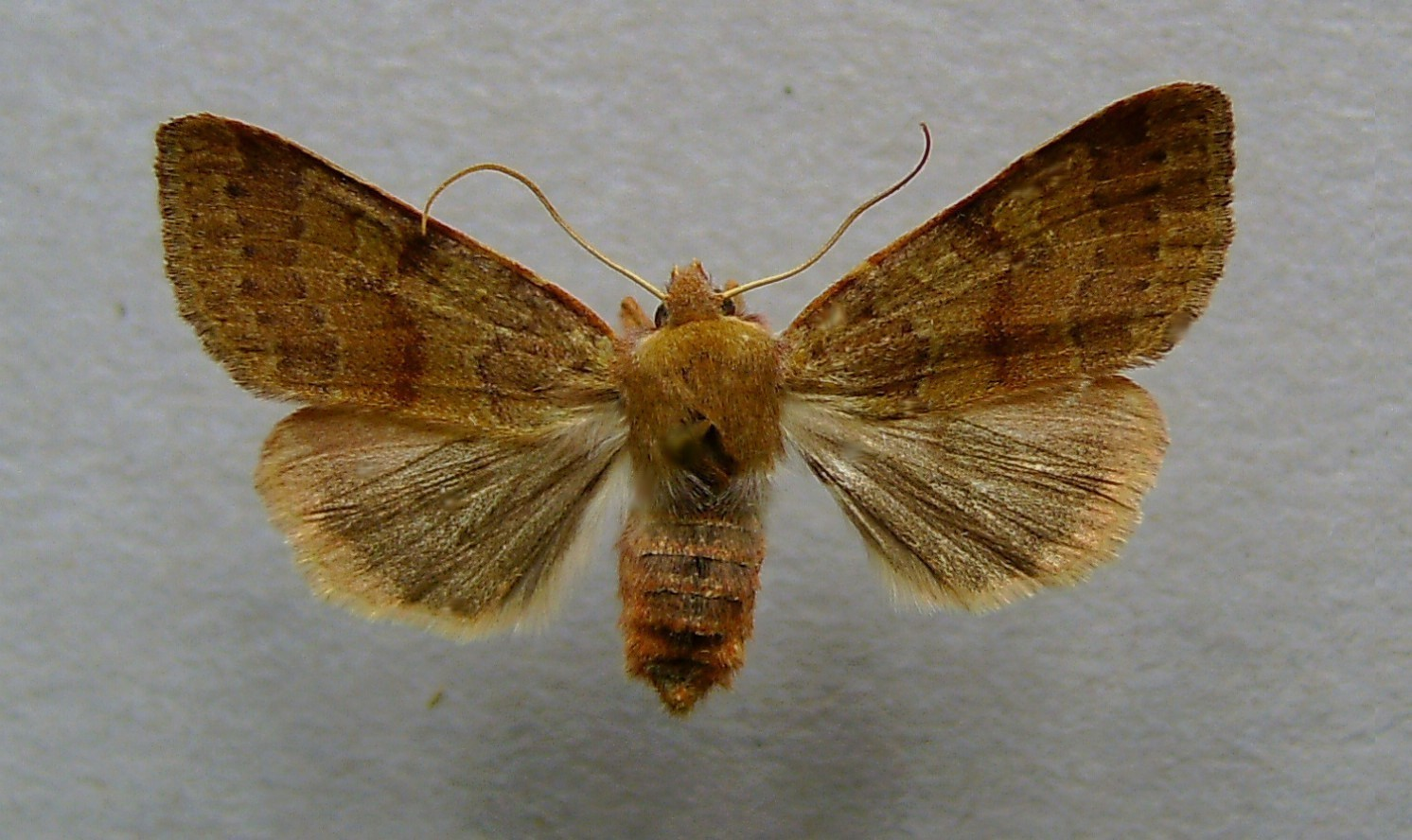
- Agrochola helvola

Scientific classification
- Kingdom: Animalia
- Phylum: Arthropoda
- Clade: Pancrustacea
- Class: Insecta
- Order: Lepidoptera
- Superfamily: Noctuoidea
- Family: Noctuidae
- Tribe: Xylenini
- Subtribe: Xylenina
- Genus: Agrochola; Hübner, 1821

= Agrochola =

Genus of moths

Agrochola is a genus of moths of the family Noctuidae. The genus was erected by Jacob Hübner in 1821.

== Species ==
- Agrochola agnorista Boursin, 1955
- Agrochola albimacula Kononenko, 1978
- Agrochola albirena Boursin, 1956
- Agrochola antiqua (Hacker, 1993)
- Agrochola approximata (Hampson, 1906)
- Agrochola attila Hreblay & Ronkay, 1999
- Agrochola azerica Ronkay & Gyulai, 1997
- Agrochola blidaensis (Stertz, 1915)
- Agrochola circellaris (Hufnagel, 1766) – the brick
- Agrochola deleta (Staudinger, 1881)
- Agrochola disrupta Wiltshire, 1952
- Agrochola dubatolovi Varga & Ronkay, 1991
- Agrochola egorovi (Bang-Haas, 1934)
- Agrochola evelina (Butler, 1879)
- Agrochola fibigeri Hacker & Moberg, 1989
- Agrochola flavirena (Moore, 1881)
- Agrochola gorza Hreblay & Ronkay, 1999
- Agrochola gratiosa (Staudinger, 1881)
- Agrochola haematidea (Duponchel, 1827) – southern chestnut
- Agrochola helvola (Linnaeus, 1758)
- Agrochola humilis (Denis & Schiffermüller, 1775)
- Agrochola hypotaenia (Bytinski-Salz, 1936)
- Agrochola imitana Ronkay, 1984
- Agrochola insularis (Walker, 1875)
- Agrochola janhillmanni (Hacker & Moberg, 1989)
- Agrochola karma Hreblay, Peregovits & Ronkay, 1999
- Agrochola kindermanni (Fischer von Röslerstamm, [1841])
- Agrochola kosagezai Hreblay, Peregovits & Ronkay, 1999
- Agrochola kunandrasi Hreblay & Ronkay, 1999
- Agrochola lactiflora (Draudt, 1934)
- Agrochola laevis (Hübner, [1803])
- Agrochola leptographa Hacker & Ronkay, 1990
- Agrochola litura (Linnaeus, 1761)
- Agrochola lota (Clerck, 1759) – red-line Quaker
- Agrochola luteogrisea (Warren, 1911)
- Agrochola lychnidis (Denis & Schiffermüller, 1775) – beaded chestnut
- Agrochola macilenta (Hübner, [1809]) – yellow-line Quaker
- Agrochola mansueta (Herrich-Schäffer, [1850])
- Agrochola meridionalis (Staudinger, 1871)
- Agrochola minorata Hreblay & Ronkay, 1999
- Agrochola naumanni Hacker & Ronkay, 1990
- Agrochola nekrasovi Hacker & Ronkay, 1992
- Agrochola nigriclava Boursin, 1957
- Agrochola nitida (Denis & Schiffermüller, 1775)
- Agrochola occulta Hacker, [1997]
- Agrochola orejoni Agenjo, 1951
- Agrochola orientalis Fibiger, 1997
- Agrochola oropotamica (Wiltshire, 1941)
- Agrochola osthelderi Boursin, 1951
- Agrochola pallidilinea Hreblay, Peregovits & Ronkay, 1999
- Agrochola pamiricola Hacker & Ronkay, 1992
- Agrochola phaeosoma (Hampson, 1906)
- Agrochola pistacinoides (d'Aubuisson, 1867)
- Agrochola plumbea (Wiltshire, 1941)
- Agrochola plumbitincta Hreblay, Peregovits & Ronkay, 1999
- Agrochola prolai Berio, 1976
- Agrochola pulchella (Smith, 1900)
- Agrochola pulvis (Guenée, 1852)
- Agrochola punctilinea Hreblay & Ronkay, 1999
- Agrochola purpurea (Grote, 1874)
- Agrochola rufescentior (Rothschild, 1914)
- Agrochola rupicapra (Staudinger, 1878)
- Agrochola sairtana Derra, 1990
- Agrochola sakabei Sugi, 1980
- Agrochola scabra (Staudinger, 1891)
- Agrochola schreieri (Hacker & Weigert, 1984)
- Agrochola semirena (Draudt, 1950)
- Agrochola siamica Hreblay & Ronkay, 1999
- Agrochola spectabilis Hacker & Ronkay, 1990
- Agrochola statira Boursin, 1960
- Agrochola staudingeri Ronkay, 1984
- Agrochola telortoides Hreblay & Ronkay, 1999
- Agrochola thurneri Boursin, 1953
- Agrochola trapezoides (Staudinger, 1882)
- Agrochola tripolensis (Hampson, 1914)
- Agrochola turcomanica Ronkay, Varga & Hreblay, 1998
- Agrochola turneri Boursin, 1953
- Agrochola vulpecula (Lederer, 1853)
- Agrochola wolfsclaegeri Boursin, 1953
- Agrochola zita Hreblay & Ronkay, 1999

The following species are sometimes placed in the genus Sunira, while other authors consider Sunira to be a subgenus of Agrochola:

- Agrochola bicolorago (Guenée, 1852)
- Agrochola decipiens (Grote, 1881)
- Agrochola verberata (Smith, 1904)
