= Brick (name) =

As a given name, surname, or nickname, Brick may refer to:

== People with the given name ==
- Brick Haley (born 1966), American football coach and player
- Brick Smith (born 1959), American baseball player

== People with the nickname ==
- Brick Breeden (1904–1977), American college basketball coach and player
- Brick Bronsky (born 1964), American actor, film producer, and professional wrestler
- Brick Eldred (1892–1976), American baseball player
- Charles Harris Garrigues (1903–1974), American writer and journalist
- Brick Fleagle (1906–1992), American jazz guitarist
- Gust E. Lundberg (1920–1977), American entrepreneur, founder of the Sandy's fast-food restaurant chain
- Norman MacArthur (born 1950), shinty player and manager
- Harold Muller (1901–1962), American National Football League player-coach and track and field athlete
- Brick Owens (1885–1949), American baseball umpire
- Brick Pollitt, nickname of the main character in Cat on a Hot Tin Roof

== People with the surname ==
- Abraham L. Brick (1860–1908), American politician
- Andy Brick (born 1965), American composer and conductor
- Billy Brick, Irish hurler
- Hamudi Brick (born 1978), Arab-Israeli former footballer
- Ian Brick, Irish hurler
- Julia E. B. Brick (1819–1902), American philanthropist
- Marilyn Brick, Canadian politician
- Max Brick (born 1992), English diver
- Richard Brick (1945–2014), American film producer
- Samantha Brick (born 1971), English writer and journalist
- Scott Brick (born 1966), American actor, writer and narrator
- Shane Brick, Irish hurler
- Thomas Brick (1867–1938), Canadian politician

== See also ==
- Brick (disambiguation)
