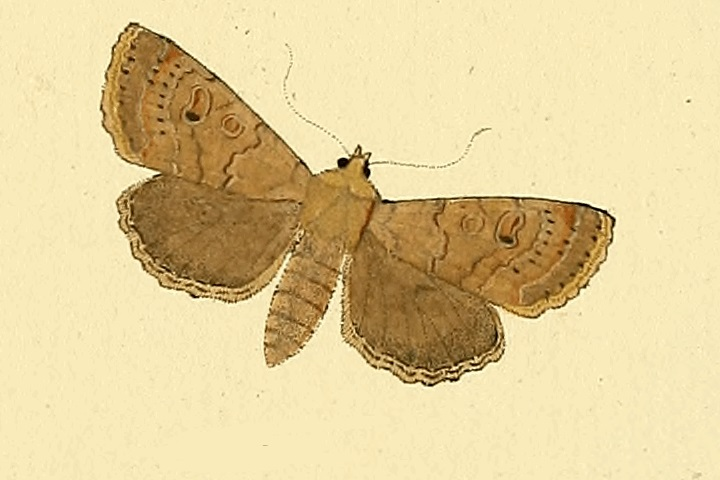

Scientific classification
- Kingdom: Animalia
- Phylum: Arthropoda
- Class: Insecta
- Order: Lepidoptera
- Superfamily: Noctuoidea
- Family: Noctuidae
- Genus: Agrochola
- Species: A. laevis

Binomial name
- Agrochola laevis (Hubner, 1803)

Synonyms
- Noctua laevis Hübner, [1803]

= Agrochola laevis =

Species of moth

Agrochola laevis is a moth of the family Noctuidae. It was described by Jacob Hübner in 1803. It has a disjunct distribution in southern and central Europe, the Near East, Asia Minor and Armenia. The habitat consists of warm deciduous forests.

The wingspan is 32–37 mm. Adults are on wing from August to October in one generation per year.

The larvae feed on Vaccinium myrtillus, Salix caprea, Stellaria media, Lamium, Quercus, Rumex and Ulmus species.
