= Brico (disambiguation) =

Brico may refer to:

- Antonia Brico (1902-1989) Dutch musician
- Brico, Belgian hardware store
- Brico Dépôt, French hardware store
- Brico Centre (operating as "Brico"), former name of Canadian renovation centre chain Reno-Depot
- Brico Club, French TV series

== See also ==
- BricoMarché, European hardware store
- Brico Cross, Low Countries cyclo-cross racing series
- Bricolage (disambiguation)
- Brick (disambiguation)
- Bric (disambiguation)
