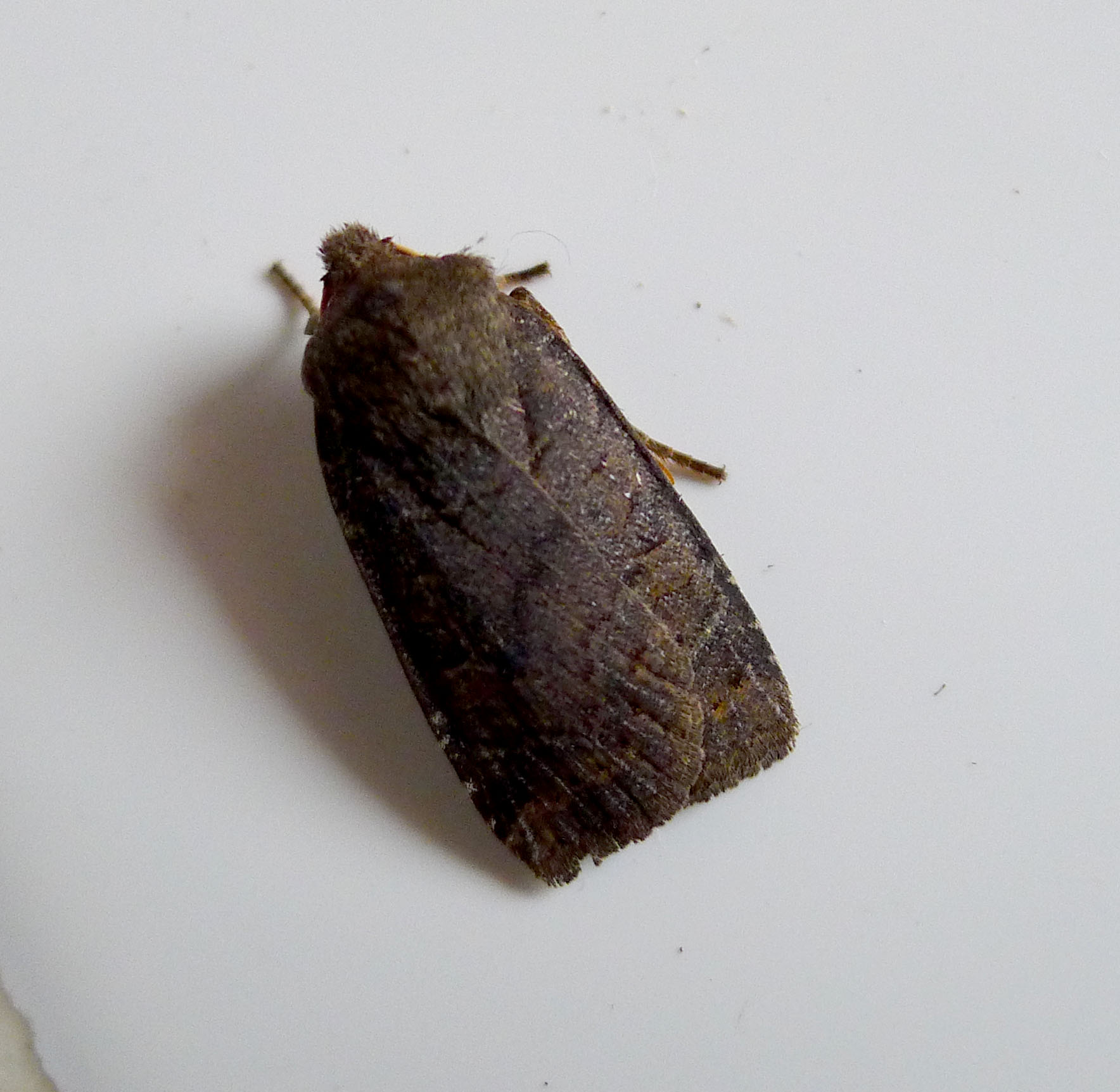

Scientific classification
- Domain: Eukaryota
- Kingdom: Animalia
- Phylum: Arthropoda
- Class: Insecta
- Order: Lepidoptera
- Superfamily: Noctuoidea
- Family: Noctuidae
- Genus: Agrochola
- Species: A. haematidea

Binomial name
- Agrochola haematidea (Duponchel, 1827)

= Agrochola haematidea =

Southern chestnut

Species of moth

Agrochola haematidea, the southern chestnut, is a moth of the family Noctuidae. The species was first described by Philogène Auguste Joseph Duponchel in 1827. It is found in the southern parts of Europe (including the southernmost parts of Great Britain).

== Technical description and variation ==
A. haematidea Dup. (37 d). Forewing smooth, deep chestnut brown, darker along inner margin, paler in terminal area; cell and median shade deeper chestnut; lines indistinct, the outer double; submarginal line preceded by a row of small black marks and on costa by a blackish blotch; stigmata small, undefined, pale; the orbicular oblique nearly touching reniform at bottom; hindwing fuscous, the fringe pinkish. The forewing has the apex acute and termen oblique.

The wingspan is 32–38 mm.

== Biology ==
The moth flies from October to November depending on the location. The larvae feed on Erica cinerea and Erica tetralix.

== Notes ==
In England it was first discovered by Professor Colin Smith of Cambridge University.
