= Bricolage (disambiguation) =

Bricolage is construction using whatever was available at the time.

Bricolage may also refer to:

- Bricolage (album), an album by Amon Tobin
- Bricolage (software), a content management system
- Mr. Bricolage, a French hardware retail chain
- Bricolage Production Company, theatre company in Pittsburgh, US

== See also ==
- Brico (disambiguation)
