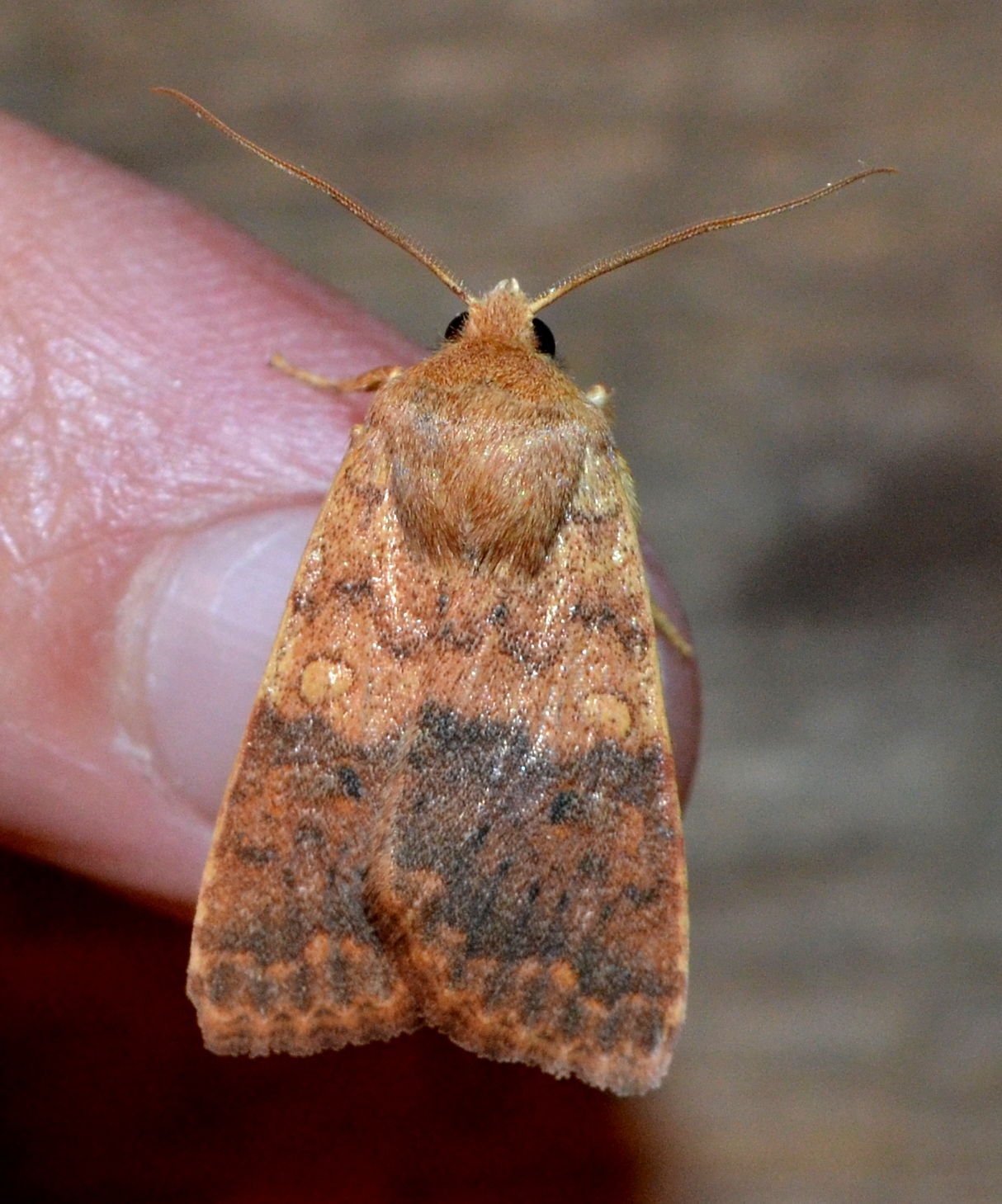

Scientific classification
- Kingdom: Animalia
- Phylum: Arthropoda
- Class: Insecta
- Order: Lepidoptera
- Superfamily: Noctuoidea
- Family: Noctuidae
- Genus: Agrochola
- Species: A. bicolorago

Binomial name
- Agrochola bicolorago Guenée, 1852

Synonyms
- Sunira bicolorago; Xanthia bicolorago; Xanthia spurgata; Agrochola straminea Smith, 1907; Orthosia straminea; Sunira straminea

= Agrochola bicolorago =

Species of moth

Agrochola bicolorago, the bicolored sallow or shield-backed cutworm, is a moth in the family Noctuidae. The species was first described by Achille Guenée in 1852. It is found in the eastern half of the United States (except southern Florida) and Canada.

The wingspan is 28–38 mm. Adults are on wing from August to December in the south and from September to November in the north.

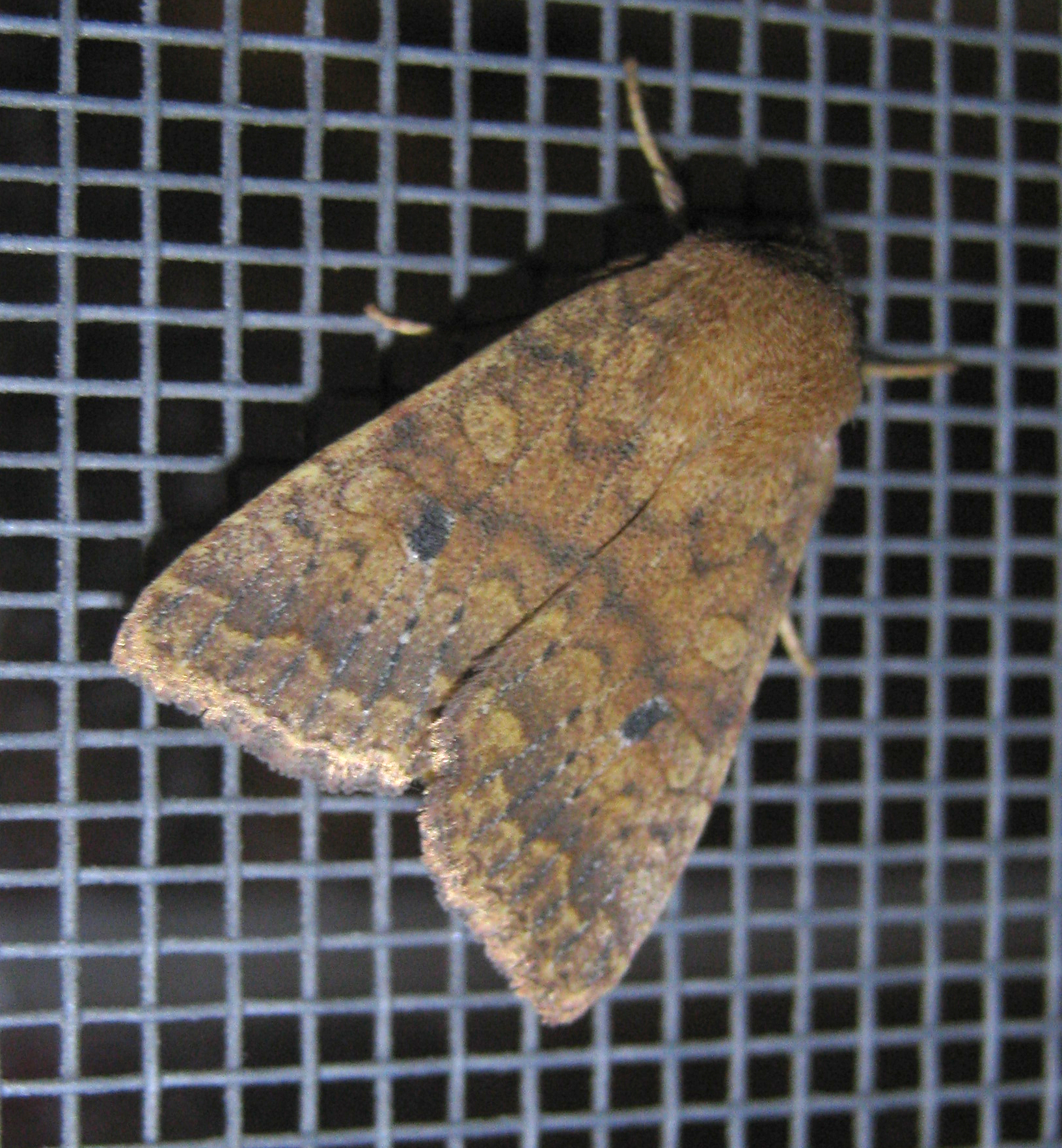
