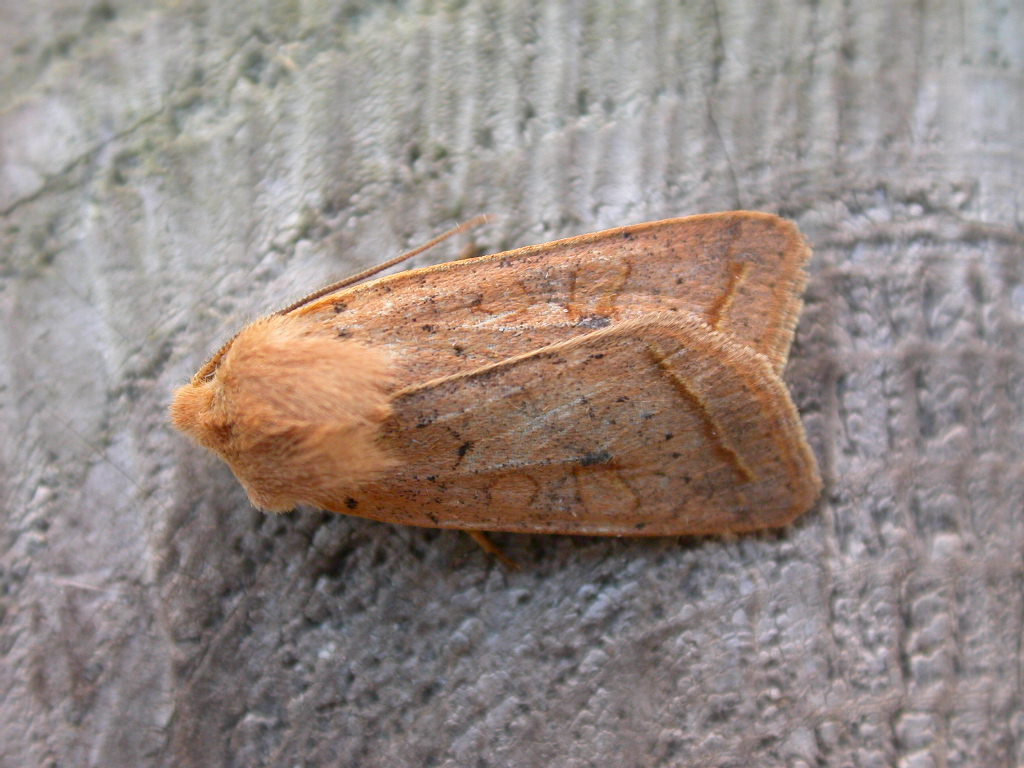

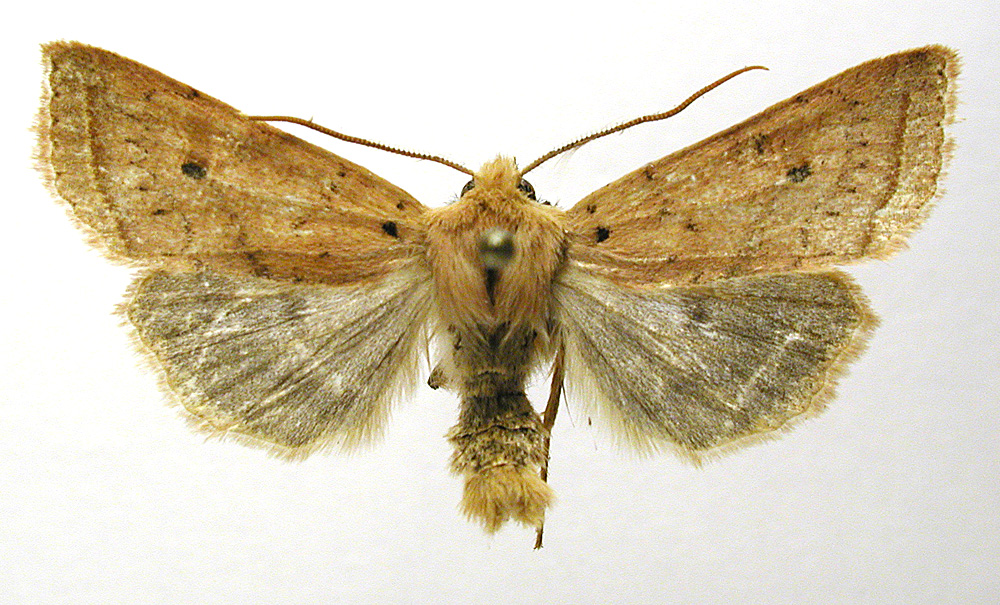

Scientific classification
- Kingdom: Animalia
- Phylum: Arthropoda
- Clade: Pancrustacea
- Class: Insecta
- Order: Lepidoptera
- Superfamily: Noctuoidea
- Family: Noctuidae
- Genus: Agrochola
- Species: A. macilenta

Binomial name
- Agrochola macilenta (Hübner, 1809)

= Agrochola macilenta =

Species of moth

Agrochola macilenta, the yellow-line Quaker, is a moth of the family Noctuidae. The species was first described by Jacob Hübner in 1809. It is found in Europe (except Russia) and in Asia Minor.

== Description ==
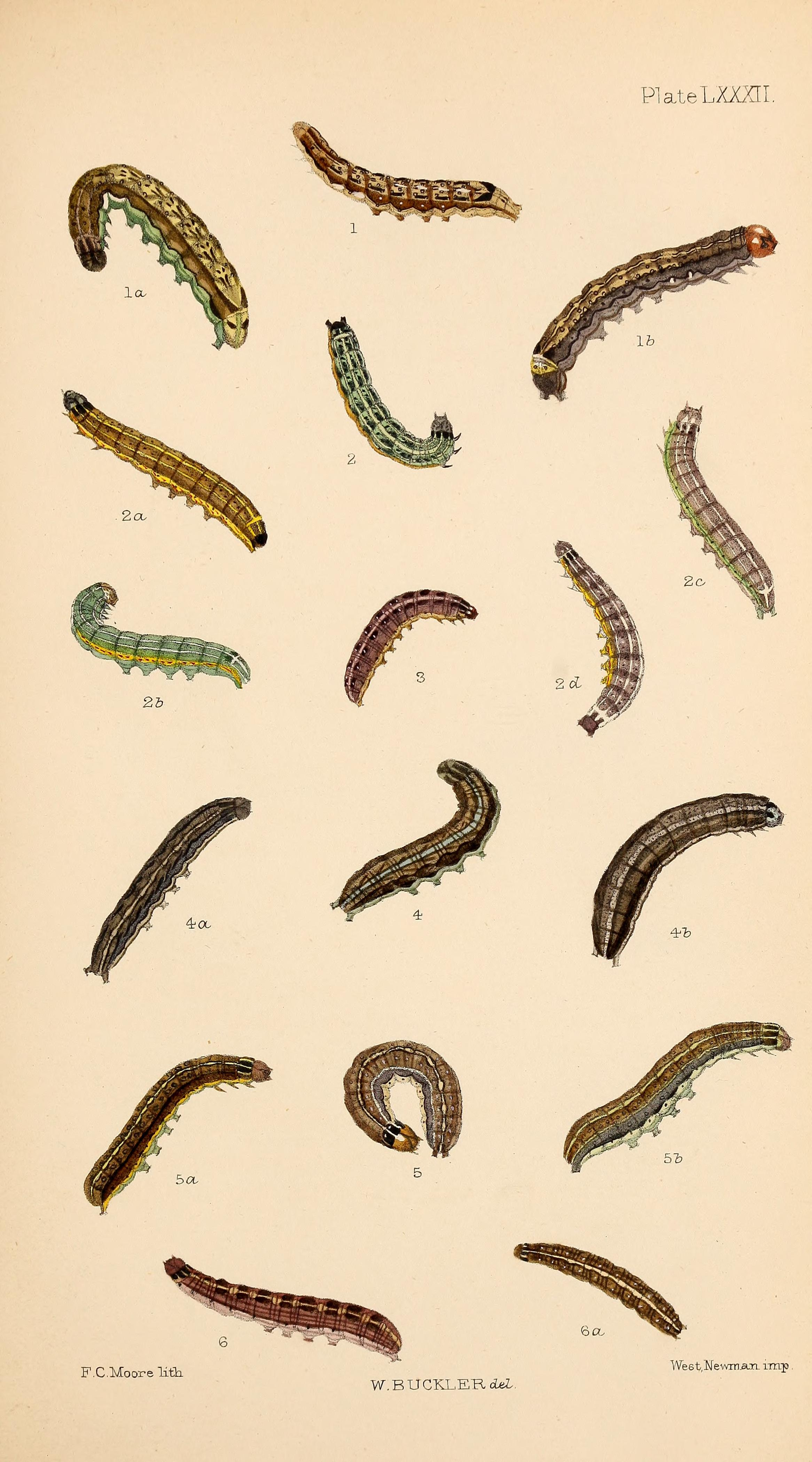
Figs 6 larvae after final moult

The adult moth has a wingspan of 32-36 mm. The wings range in colour by specimen from yellow to reddish brown. Antemedian and postmedian lines are small dark dots. Subterminal line is straight, and outlined with a fine reddish line. Stigmata is not well defined but sometimes visible.

It is attracted to light.

The moth flies from September to December depending on the location.

The larvae feed on various shrubs and deciduous trees, including Carpinus, Crataegus, Fagus, Populus, Prunus, Ulmus, Salix, Quercus, Calluna, Hieracium, and Plantago.

== Distribution ==
The species is found in Europe from Iberia to parts of Scandinavia. Commonly found in open woodland, and heaths.
