= Greenstone (software) =

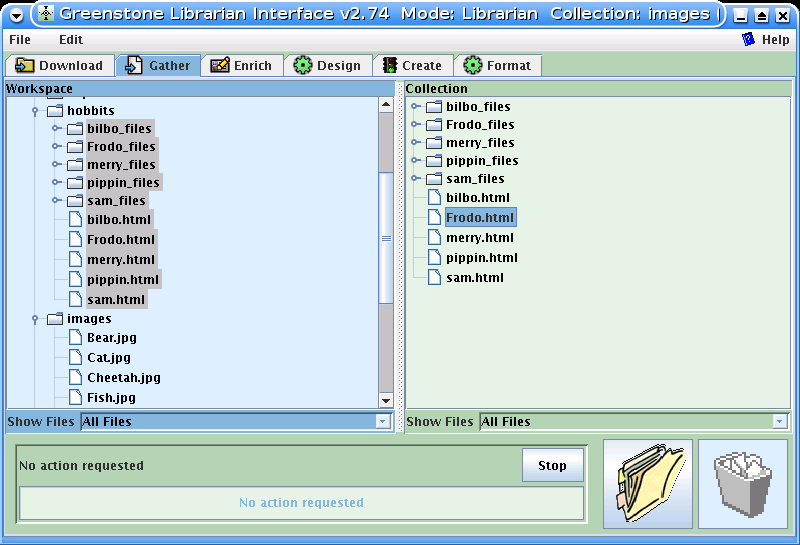
- Greenstone's Graphical Librarian Interface (GLI) v2.80
- Developer(s): University of Waikato

Stable release(s)
- Greenstone3: 3.10 / February 28, 2021; 4 years ago
- Greenstone2: 2.87 / October 1, 2017; 7 years ago
- Repository: trac.greenstone.org/browser/main/trunk/greenstone3
- Operating system: Cross-platform
- Type: Digital libraries
- License: GPL
- Website: www.greenstone.org

Greenstone is a suite of software tools for building and distributing digital library collections on the Internet or CD-ROM. It is open-source, multilingual software, issued under the terms of the GNU General Public License. Greenstone is produced by the New Zealand Digital Library Project at the University of Waikato, and has been developed and distributed in cooperation with UNESCO and the Human Info NGO in Belgium.

The developers of Greenstone received the International Federation for Information Processing's 2004 Namur Award for "contributions to the awareness of social implications of information technology, and the need for an holistic approach in the use of information technology that takes account of social implications."

Greenstone may be used to create large, searchable collections of digital documents. In addition to command line tools for digital collection building, Greenstone has a graphical Greenstone Librarians Interface (GLI) used to build collections and assign metadata.

Through user selected plugins, Greenstone can import digital documents in formats including text, html, jpg, tiff, MP3, PDF, video, and Word, among others. The text, PDF, HTML and similar documents are converted into Greenstone Archive Format (GAF) which is an XML equivalent format.

A project on SourceForge was created in October 2005 for version 3 of Greenstone. In 2010, Greenstone version 2.83 was included, along with the Koha Integrated Library System, in an Ubuntu Live-Cd.
