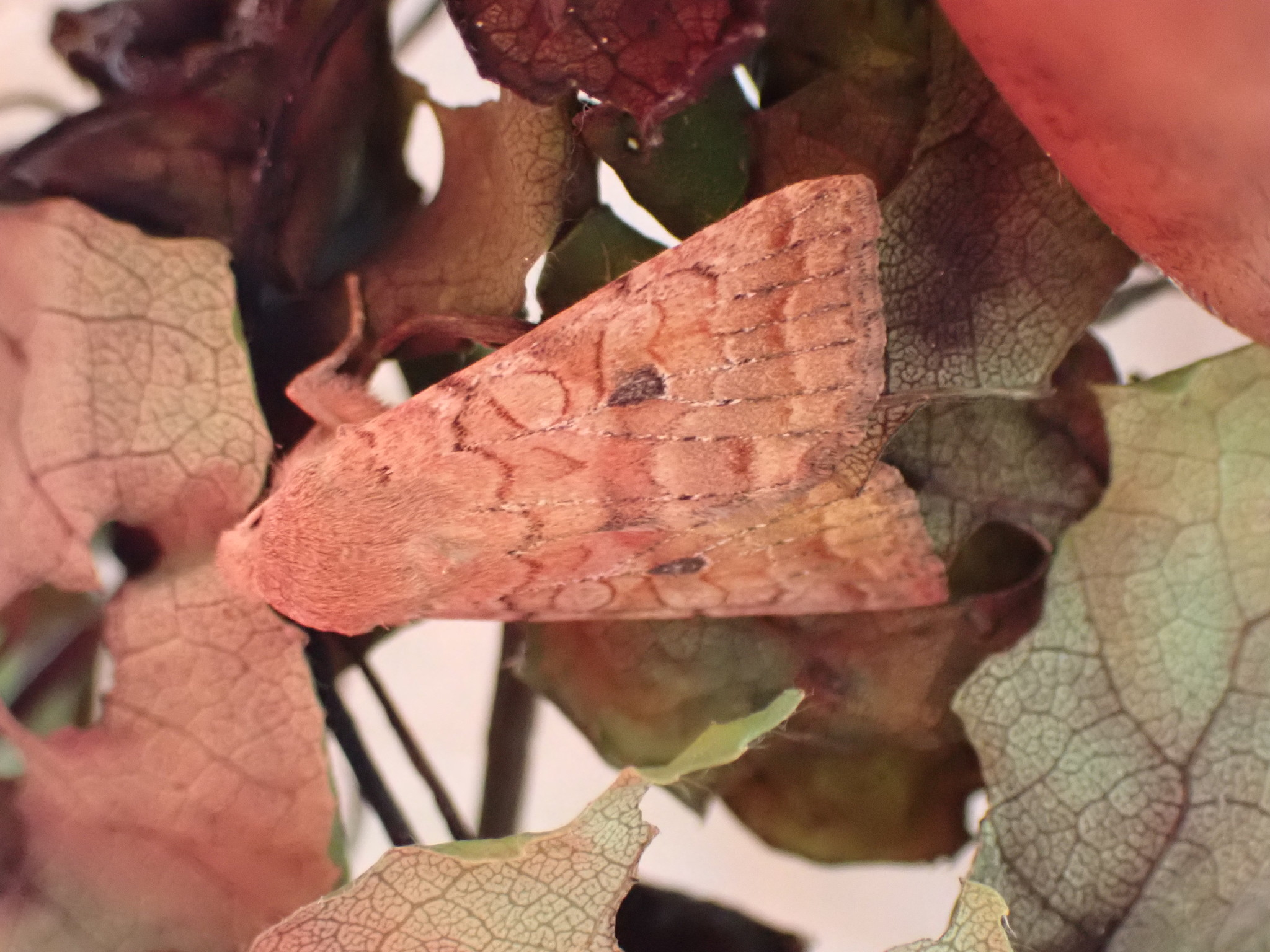
- as Sunira verberata from iNaturalist
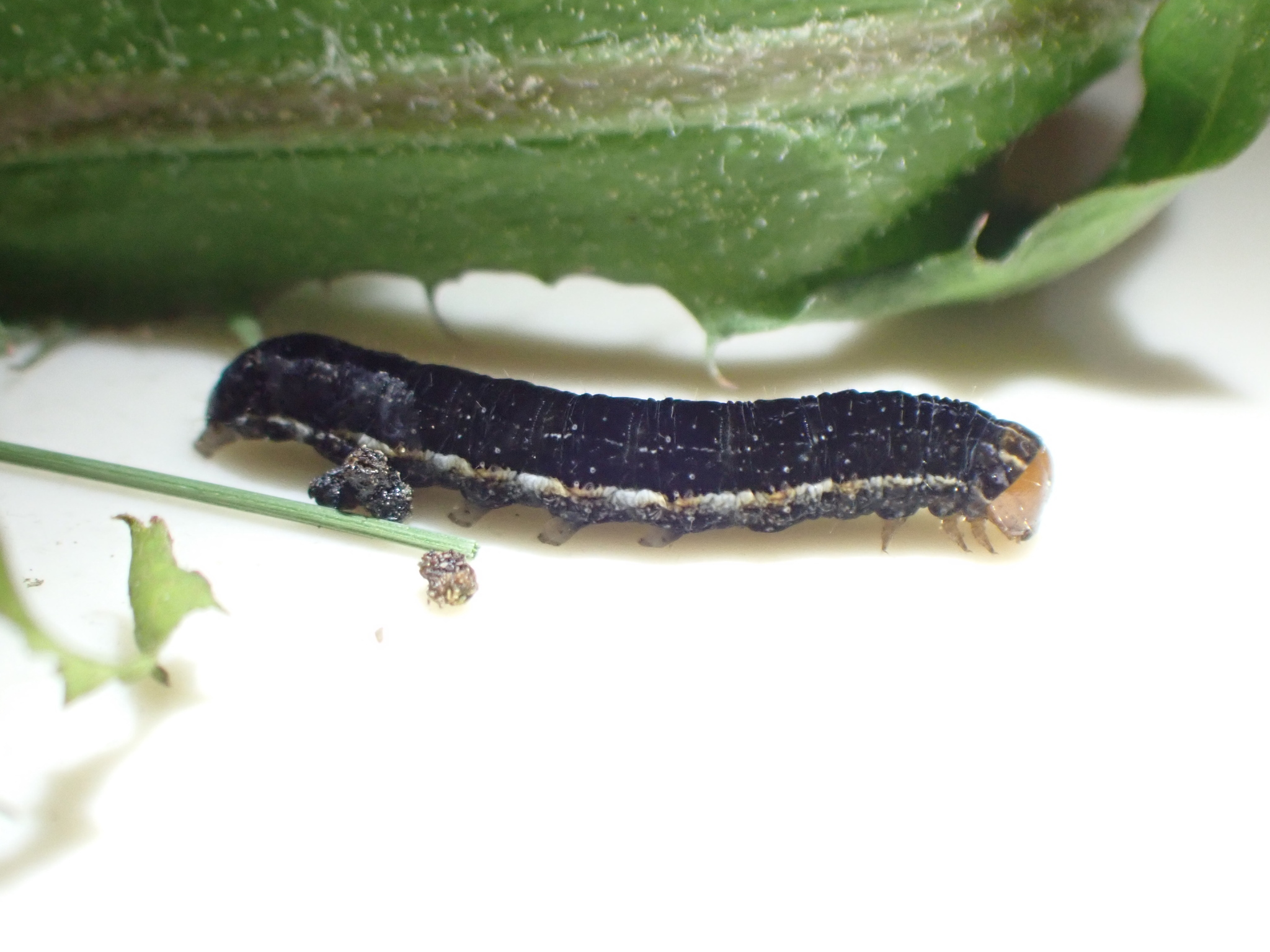
- as Sunira verberata from iNaturalist

Scientific classification
- Kingdom: Animalia
- Phylum: Arthropoda
- Class: Insecta
- Order: Lepidoptera
- Superfamily: Noctuoidea
- Family: Noctuidae
- Genus: Agrochola
- Species: A. verberata

Binomial name
- Agrochola verberata Smith, 1904

Synonyms
- Orthosia verberata; Sunira verberata

= Agrochola verberata =

Species of moth

Agrochola verberata is a moth in the family Noctuidae first described by Smith in 1904. It is found in western North America, from south-central Saskatchewan west to Alaska and coastal British Columbia, south to at least south-western Montana and south-western Colorado.

The wingspan is 30–35 mm, considered medium-size for a moth. Its identification includes darker rust scales and slate grey coloring, with similarity between the sexes. Adults are on wing from August to September depending on the location following an attraction to light and sugar baits. There is one generation per year and there are no current conservation concerns.
