= Agrochola decipiens =

Scientific classification
- Domain: Eukaryota
- Kingdom: Animalia
- Phylum: Arthropoda
- Class: Insecta
- Order: Lepidoptera
- Superfamily: Noctuoidea
- Family: Noctuidae
- Genus: Agrochola
- Species: A. decipiens

Binomial name
- Agrochola decipiens Grote, 1881

Synonyms
- Sunira decipiens; Sunira acta; Agrochola acta; Orthosia acta; Orthosia decipiens

Species of moth

Agrochola decipiens is a moth in the family Noctuidae. It is found in Western North America.
