= Olius =

- Municipality
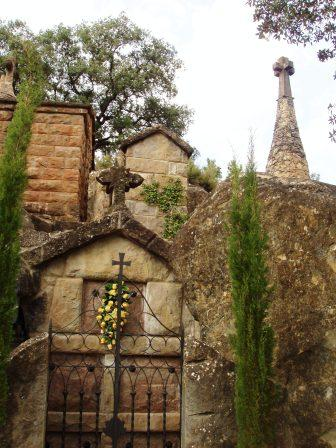
- Olius cemetery

- Flag Coat of arms

- Location in Catalonia
- Coordinates: 41.974°N 1.558°E
- Country: Spain
- Community: Catalonia
- Province: Lleida
- Comarca: Solsonès

Government
  - Mayor: Antoni Félix Márquez (2015)

Area
  - Total: 54.8 km^{2} (21.2 sq mi)
- Elevation: 565 m (1,854 ft)

Population (2025-01-01)
  - Total: 990
  - Density: 18/km^{2} (47/sq mi)
- Website: olius.cat

Olius (Catalan pronunciation: [uˈliws]) is a municipality in the comarca of Solsonès in Catalonia, Spain. It has a population of 990 (register office, 2025).

It is situated on the Cardener River above the reservoir of Sant Ponç. The village is served by the C-149 road between Solsona and Berga. The church of Sant Esteve d'Olius is a protected historico-artistic monument.

== Subdivisions ==
The municipality of Olius is formed of four villages. Populations are given as of 2005:

- Brics (64)
- El Castellvell (38)
- Olius (118)
- El Pi de Sant Just (395)

The municipality surrounds Solsona except to the north and includes a small exclave within Solsona.

== Demography ==
1900	1930	1950	1970	1986	2006
488	572	559	323	473	752
