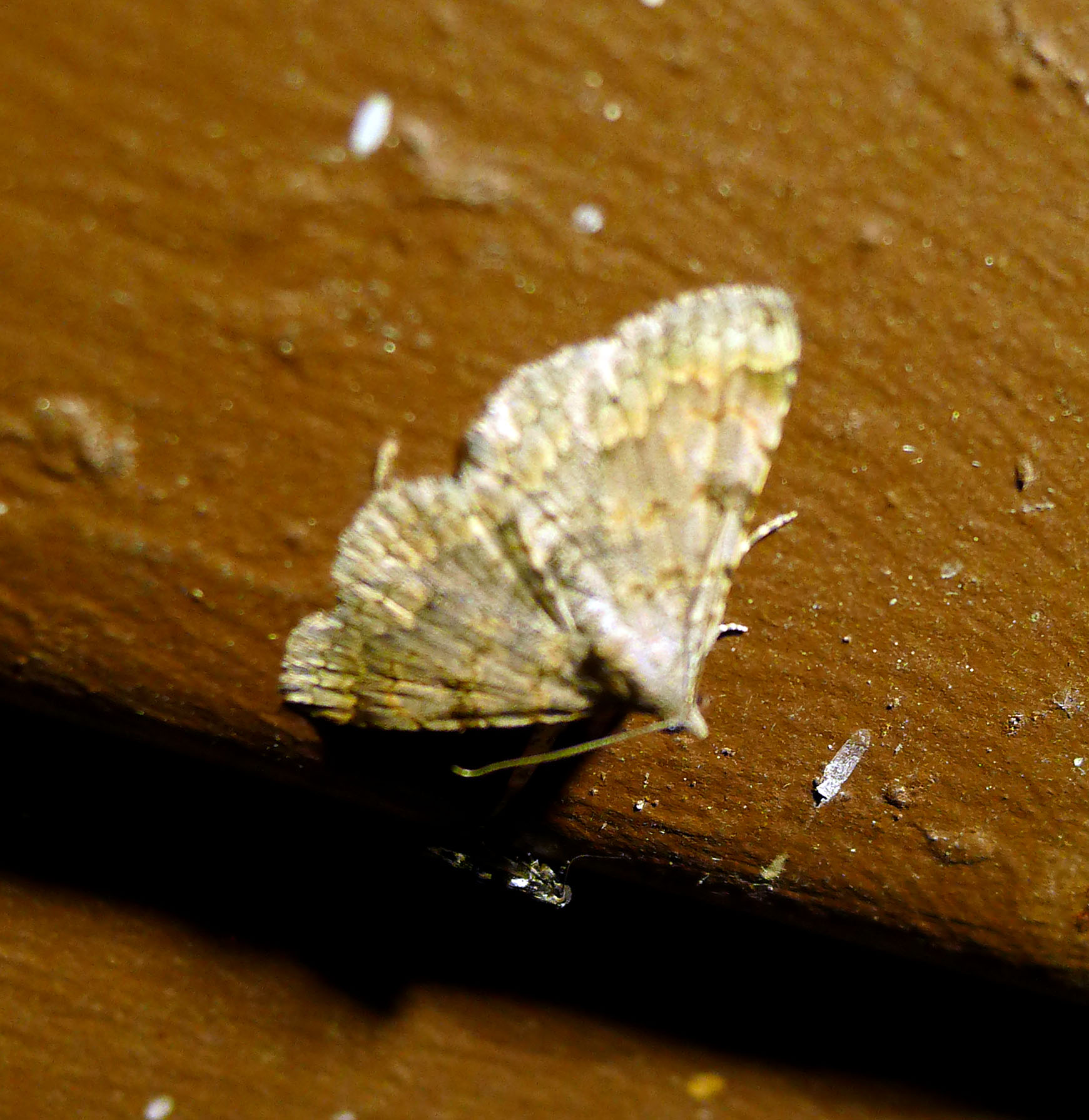

Scientific classification
- Domain: Eukaryota
- Kingdom: Animalia
- Phylum: Arthropoda
- Class: Insecta
- Order: Lepidoptera
- Superfamily: Noctuoidea
- Family: Erebidae
- Subfamily: Boletobiinae
- Genus: Nychioptera
- Species: N. accola

Binomial name
- Nychioptera accola Franclemont, 1966

= Nychioptera accola =

Species of moth

Nychioptera accola is a species of moth in the family Erebidae first described by John G. Franclemont in 1966. It is found in North America.

The MONA or Hodges number for Nychioptera accola is 8486.
