= Mycterophora geometriformis =

Scientific classification
- Kingdom: Animalia
- Phylum: Arthropoda
- Clade: Pancrustacea
- Class: Insecta
- Order: Lepidoptera
- Superfamily: Noctuoidea
- Family: Erebidae
- Subfamily: Boletobiinae
- Genus: Mycterophora
- Species: M. geometriformis

Binomial name
- Mycterophora geometriformis Hill, 1924

Species of moth

Mycterophora geometriformis is a species of moth in the family Erebidae. It is found in North America.
