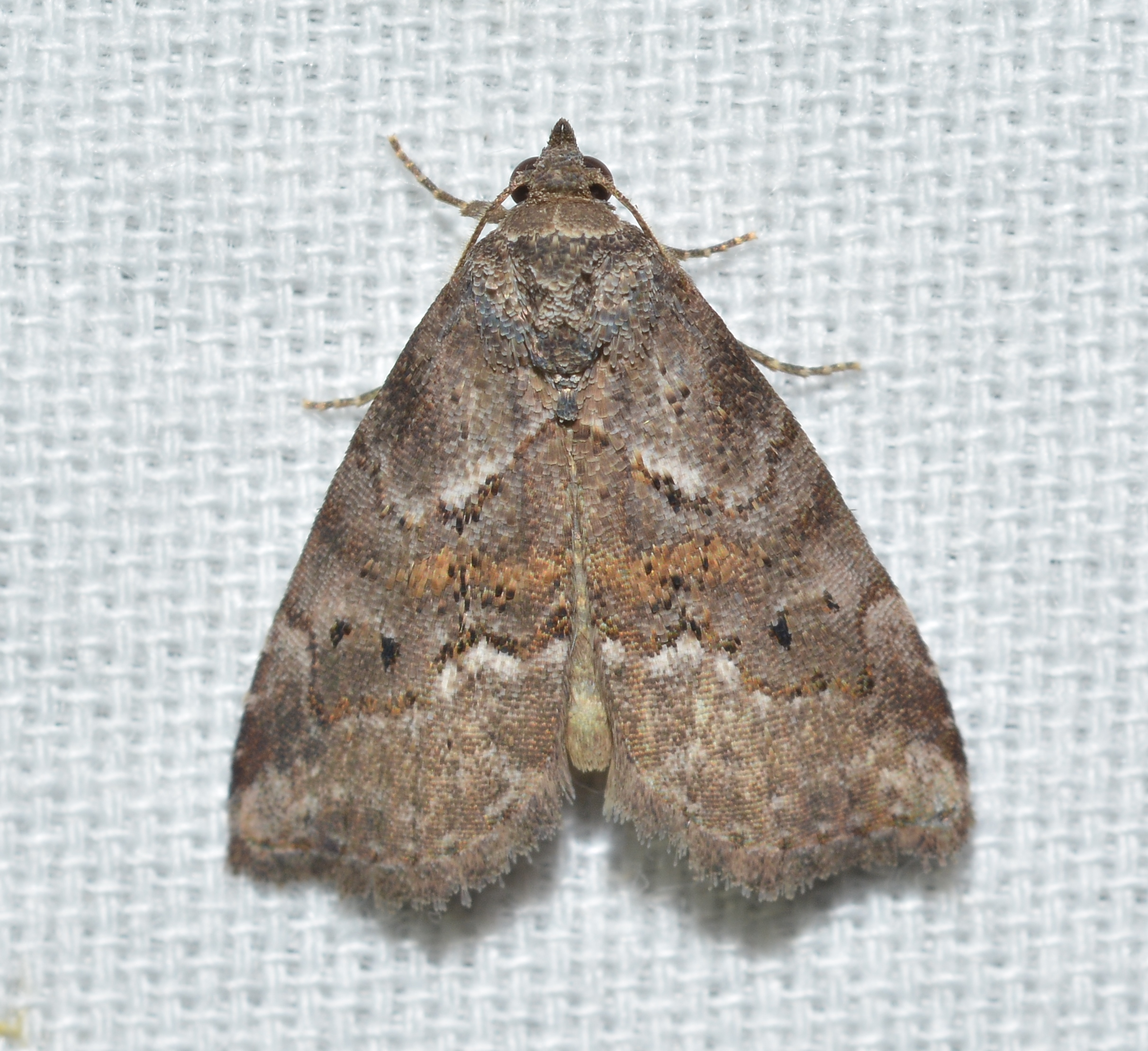

Scientific classification
- Kingdom: Animalia
- Phylum: Arthropoda
- Class: Insecta
- Order: Lepidoptera
- Superfamily: Noctuoidea
- Family: Erebidae
- Subfamily: Boletobiinae
- Genus: Hyperstrotia
- Species: H. nana

Binomial name
- Hyperstrotia nana (Hübner, 1818)

= Hyperstrotia nana =

Species of moth

Hyperstrotia nana, the white-lined graylet, is a species of moth in the family Erebidae. It is found in North America.

The MONA or Hodges number for Hyperstrotia nana is 9035.
