= Allerastria albiciliatus =

Scientific classification
- Domain: Eukaryota
- Kingdom: Animalia
- Phylum: Arthropoda
- Class: Insecta
- Order: Lepidoptera
- Superfamily: Noctuoidea
- Family: Erebidae
- Subfamily: Boletobiinae
- Genus: Allerastria
- Species: A. albiciliatus

Binomial name
- Allerastria albiciliatus (Smith, 1903)

Species of moth

Allerastria albiciliatus is a moth species in the family Erebidae. It is found in North America.

The MONA or Hodges number for Allerastria albiciliatus is 9020.
