= Nychioptera opada =

Scientific classification
- Domain: Eukaryota
- Kingdom: Animalia
- Phylum: Arthropoda
- Class: Insecta
- Order: Lepidoptera
- Superfamily: Noctuoidea
- Family: Erebidae
- Subfamily: Boletobiinae
- Genus: Nychioptera
- Species: N. opada

Binomial name
- Nychioptera opada Franclemont, 1966

Species of moth

Nychioptera opada is a species of moth in the family Erebidae. It is found in North America.

The MONA or Hodges number for Nychioptera opada is 8487.
