= Glympis concors =

Scientific classification
- Kingdom: Animalia
- Phylum: Arthropoda
- Class: Insecta
- Order: Lepidoptera
- Superfamily: Noctuoidea
- Family: Erebidae
- Subfamily: Boletobiinae
- Genus: Glympis
- Species: G. concors

Binomial name
- Glympis concors (Hübner, 1823)

Species of moth

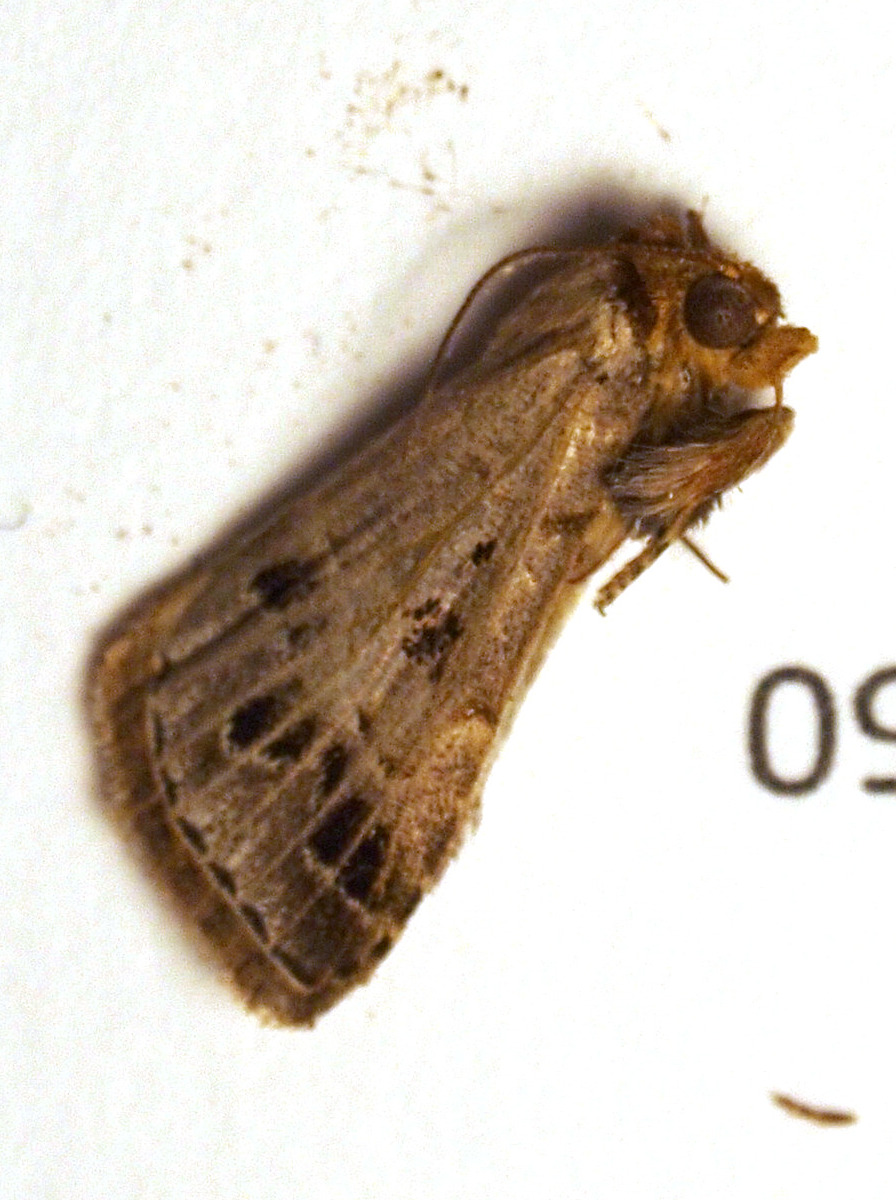
Glympis concors

Glympis concors is a species of moth in the family Erebidae.

The MONA or Hodges number for Glympis concors is 8478.
