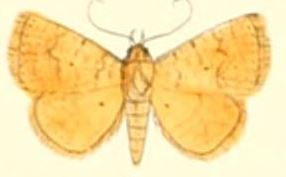

Scientific classification
- Kingdom: Animalia
- Phylum: Arthropoda
- Clade: Pancrustacea
- Class: Insecta
- Order: Lepidoptera
- Superfamily: Noctuoidea
- Family: Erebidae
- Subfamily: Boletobiinae
- Genus: Raparna; Moore, 1882

Synonyms
- Rapara Pagenstecher, 1909

= Raparna =

Genus of moths

Raparna is a genus of moths of the family Erebidae.

== Description ==
Palpi with second joint reaching vertex of head and thickly scaled. Third joint long and naked. Antennae minutely ciliated in male. Thorax and abdomen smoothly scaled. Tibia nearly naked. Forewings with rectangular or rounded apex. The areole sometimes very small if present, or usually absent. Hindwings with vein 5 from well above lower angle of cell. Vein 3 and 4 from cell or on a very short stalk.

== Taxonomy ==
The genus has previously been classified in the subfamily Phytometrinae of Erebidae or the subfamily Calpinae of the family Noctuidae.

== Species ==
- Raparna bipuncta Warren & Rothschild, 1905
- Raparna confusa Mabille, 1900
- Raparna conicephala (Staudinger, 1870)
- Raparna crocophara Turner, 1922
- Raparna minima Warren & Rothschild, 1905
- Raparna ochreipennis Moore, 1882

== Former species ==
- Raparna didyma Mabille, 1900 was later Rivula didyma (Mabille, 1900) after Hacker, 2021.
- Raparna limbata Butler, 1898 was later Ozarba limbata (Butler, 1898)
- Euperia melanospila Guenée, 1852, then Raparna melanospila or Zargata melanospila was later Janseodes melanospila (Guenée, 1852)
- Raparna tritonias Hampson, 1902 was later Raparnodes tritonias (Hampson, 1902) after Hacker, 2019.
