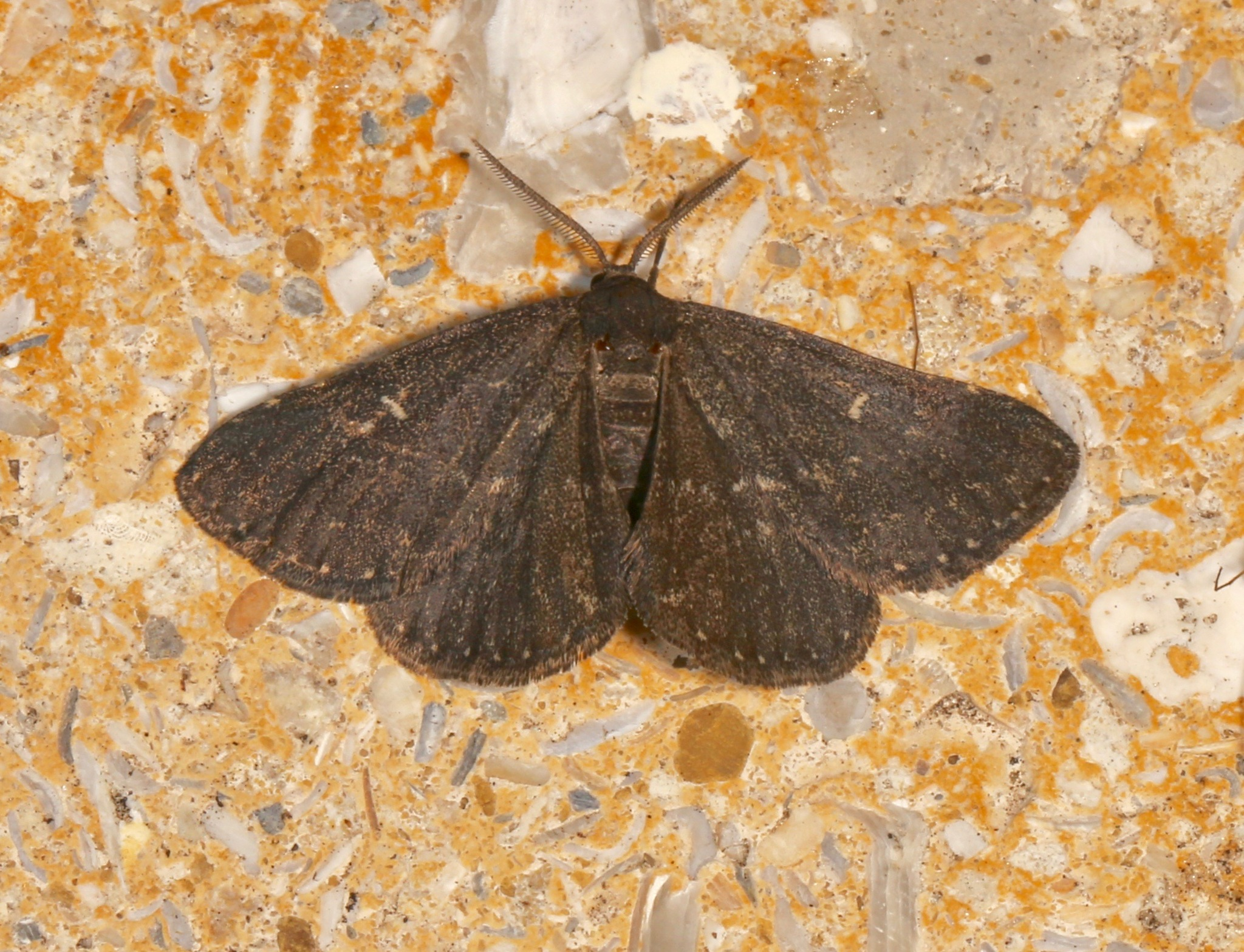
- In Florida, US

Scientific classification
- Kingdom: Animalia
- Phylum: Arthropoda
- Clade: Pancrustacea
- Class: Insecta
- Order: Lepidoptera
- Superfamily: Noctuoidea
- Family: Erebidae
- Subfamily: Boletobiinae
- Genus: Prosoparia
- Species: P. floridana

Binomial name
- Prosoparia floridana Lafontaine & Dickel, 2009

= Prosoparia floridana =

Species of moth

Prosoparia floridana is a species of moth in the family Erebidae. It is found in North America.
