= Prosoparia perfuscaria =

Scientific classification
- Kingdom: Animalia
- Phylum: Arthropoda
- Clade: Pancrustacea
- Class: Insecta
- Order: Lepidoptera
- Superfamily: Noctuoidea
- Family: Erebidae
- Subfamily: Boletobiinae
- Genus: Prosoparia
- Species: P. perfuscaria

Binomial name
- Prosoparia perfuscaria Grote, 1883

Synonyms
- Prosoparia anormalis Barnes & McDunnough, 1912

Species of moth

Prosoparia perfuscaria, the inornate prosoparia moth, is a moth in the family Erebidae described by Augustus Radcliffe Grote in 1883. It is found in North America.

The MONA or Hodges number for Prosoparia perfuscaria is 8419.
