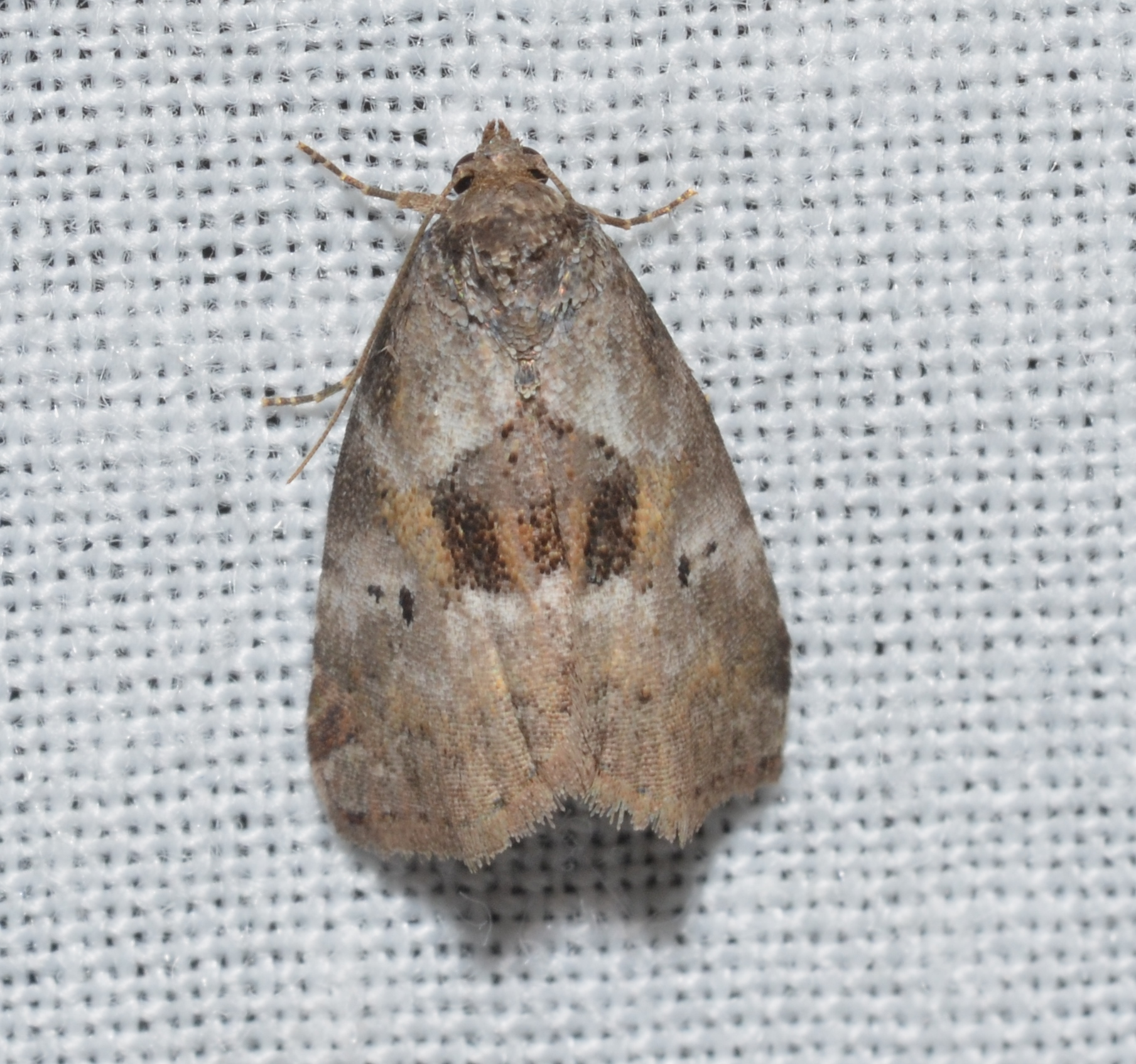

Scientific classification
- Kingdom: Animalia
- Phylum: Arthropoda
- Clade: Pancrustacea
- Class: Insecta
- Order: Lepidoptera
- Superfamily: Noctuoidea
- Family: Erebidae
- Genus: Hyperstrotia
- Species: H. secta

Binomial name
- Hyperstrotia secta (Grote, 1879)

Synonyms
- Eustrotia secta Grote, 1879

= Hyperstrotia secta =

Species of moth

Hyperstrotia secta, the black-patched graylet moth, is a moth of the family Erebidae. The species was first described by Augustus Radcliffe Grote in 1879.

== Description ==
The wingspan is approximately 15-19 mm. The forewings are predominantly gray with whitish lines. The reniform spot, a kidney-shaped marking on the forewing, contains black dots. Those black dots are sometimes connected by a bar. Adults have been recorded on wing from April to September.

The species resembles other members of the genus Hyperstrotia, particularly the dotted graylet (Hyperstrotia pervertens). However, the reniform spot on the secta generally distinguishes it from H. pervertens.

== Distribution ==
Hyperstrotia secta is native to North America, occurring primarily in the eastern United States and southern Canada. Its documented range extends from southern Ontario and Massachusetts down to Florida and west to Missouri and Texas. Historical accounts note that the documented range is uncertain due to confusion with similar looking moth species.

== Habitat ==
Hyperstrotia secta inhabits hardwood forests. In North Carolina, it has been primarily observed in wet-mesic hardwood forests. Its larvae feed on red and white oak trees.

== Life cycle ==
The life cycle of Hyperstrotia secta is poorly documented and its eggs have not been formally described. Early-instar larvae feed by skeletonizing leaves, and larvae of all instars rest on the undersides of leaves.
