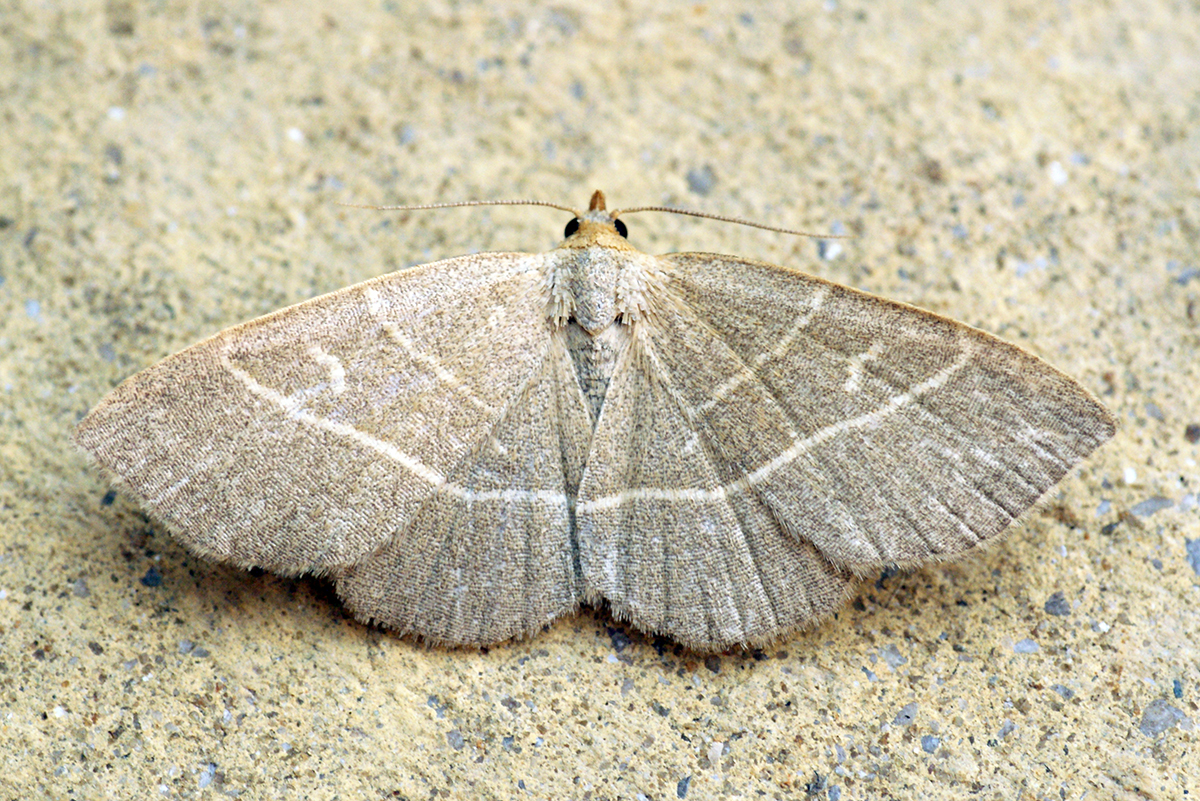

Scientific classification
- Kingdom: Animalia
- Phylum: Arthropoda
- Clade: Pancrustacea
- Class: Insecta
- Order: Lepidoptera
- Superfamily: Noctuoidea
- Family: Erebidae
- Subfamily: Boletobiinae
- Genus: Trisateles; Tams, 1939
- Species: T. emortualis

Binomial name
- Trisateles emortualis (Denis & Schiffermüller, 1775)

Synonyms
- Pyralis emortualis [Schiffermüller], 1775; Crambus emortuatus Haworth, 1809

= Trisateles =

Genus and species of moth

Trisateles is a monotypic genus of moth in the family Erebidae described by Tams in 1939. Its only species, Trisateles emortualis, the olive crescent, was first described by Michael Denis and Ignaz Schiffermüller in 1775. It is found in most of Europe, east to Siberia, northern Iran and China.

== Technical description and variation ==
A. emortualis Schiff. (= olivaria Bkh.). Forewing pale ochreous finely dusted with brown; inner and outer lines whitish ochreous, nearly straight; a similarly coloured streak at end of cell; hindwing similar, but without inner line. In the ab. consonalis Spul. the inner line of forewing is wanting; — in fascialis Spul. the median area of forewings and basal area of hindwings are conspicuously darkened with grey scales. Larva yellowish brown; dorsal line dark brown; subdorsal lines black; the tubercles black; head small, round, reddish brown with black rim. The wingspan is 29–35 mm.

== Biology ==
The moth flies from June to July depending on the location, and the species overwinters as a pupa.

The larvae feed on Quercus, Fagus, Carpinus and Rubus species. The larvae prefer withered and fallen leaves.

== Taxonomy ==
The genus has previously been classified in the subfamily Hypeninae of the family Noctuidae.
