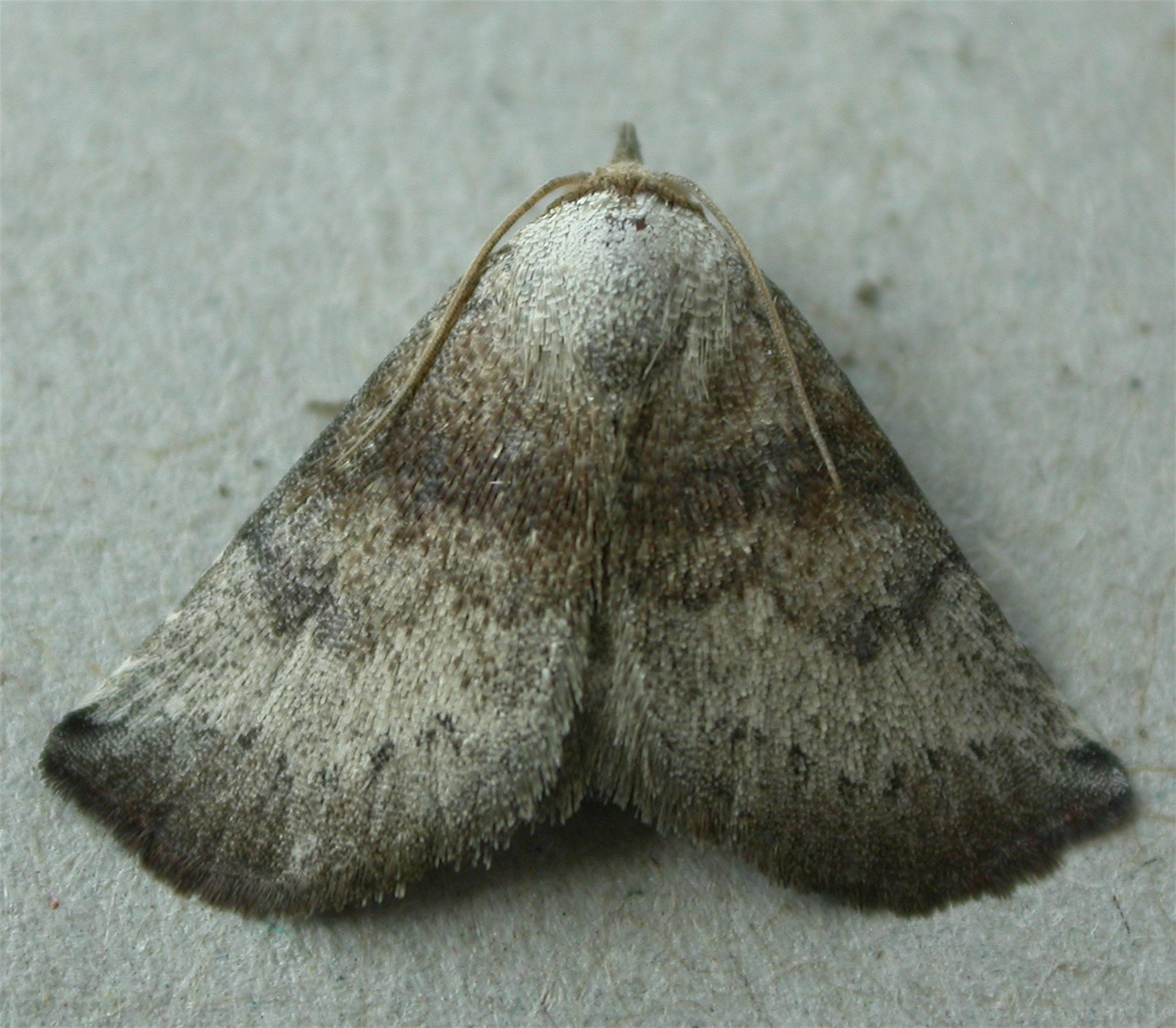

Scientific classification
- Domain: Eukaryota
- Kingdom: Animalia
- Phylum: Arthropoda
- Class: Insecta
- Order: Lepidoptera
- Superfamily: Noctuoidea
- Family: Erebidae
- Genus: Mataeomera
- Species: M. mesotaenia

Binomial name
- Mataeomera mesotaenia Turner, 1929

= Mataeomera mesotaenia =

Species of moth

Mataeomera mesotaenia is a species of moth of the family Erebidae first described by Alfred Jefferis Turner in 1929. It is found in Australia.
