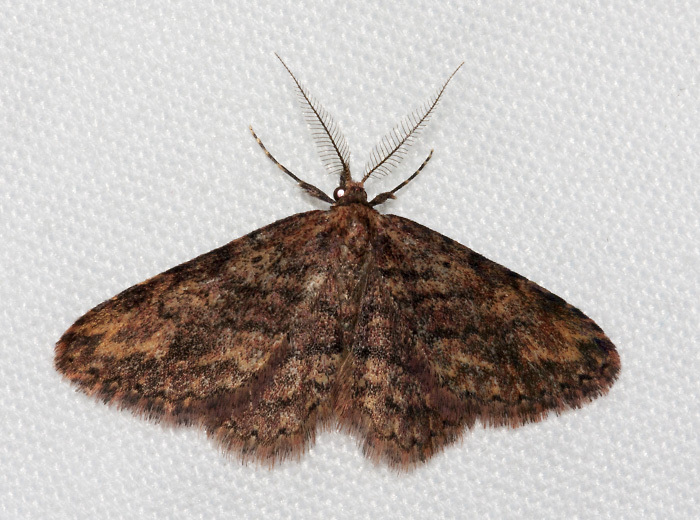

Scientific classification
- Domain: Eukaryota
- Kingdom: Animalia
- Phylum: Arthropoda
- Class: Insecta
- Order: Lepidoptera
- Superfamily: Noctuoidea
- Family: Erebidae
- Genus: Mycterophora
- Species: M. rubricans

Binomial name
- Mycterophora rubricans Barnes & McDunnough, 1918

= Mycterophora rubricans =

Species of moth

Mycterophora rubricans is a species of moth in the family Erebidae first described by William Barnes and James Halliday McDunnough in 1918. It is found in North America.
