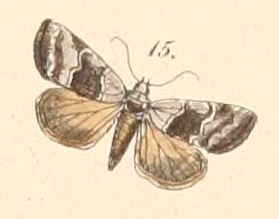

Scientific classification
- Domain: Eukaryota
- Kingdom: Animalia
- Phylum: Arthropoda
- Class: Insecta
- Order: Lepidoptera
- Superfamily: Noctuoidea
- Family: Erebidae
- Genus: Abacena
- Species: A. accincta

Binomial name
- Abacena accincta Felder and Rogenhofer, 1874

= Abacena accincta =

Species of moth

Abacena accincta is a species moth of the family Erebidae. It is found in French Guiana, Costa Rica and in Brazil.
