= Hyposada postvittata =

Scientific classification
- Domain: Eukaryota
- Kingdom: Animalia
- Phylum: Arthropoda
- Class: Insecta
- Order: Lepidoptera
- Superfamily: Noctuoidea
- Family: Erebidae
- Genus: Hyposada
- Species: H. postvittata

Binomial name
- Hyposada postvittata (Moore, 1887)

Synonyms
- Lycauges postvittata Moore, 1887; Oruza anisodoides Hampson, 1894

Species of moth

Hyposada postvittata is a moth of the family Noctuidae first described by Frederic Moore in 1887. It is found in Sri Lanka and Australia.

Adult wingspan is about 2 cm. Forewings brownish with a black outlined white spot on cell. Each forewing has a white line along the costa. Hindwings each have a black and white transverse line. There is a black mark at the wingtip.
