= Pseudcraspedia =

Scientific classification
- Kingdom: Animalia
- Phylum: Arthropoda
- Class: Insecta
- Order: Lepidoptera
- Superfamily: Noctuoidea
- Family: Erebidae
- Subfamily: Boletobiinae
- Genus: Pseudcraspedia; Hampson, 1898

Type species
- Pseudcraspedia punctata Hampson, 1898

Genus of moths

Pseudcraspedia is a genus of moths of the family Erebidae. The genus was erected by George Hampson in 1898.

== Species ==
- Pseudcraspedia basipunctaria Walker (from Florida)
- Pseudcraspedia holopolia Dyar, 1914 (from Trinidad)
- Pseudcraspedia leucozona Hampson, 1910 (from Colombia)
- Pseudcraspedia mathetes Dyar, 1914 (from Trinidad)
- Pseudcraspedia prosticta Hampson, 1910 (Uganda, Sri Lanka)
- Pseudcraspedia punctata Hampson, 1898 (Kenya, Uganda, Australia, India, Vietnam)
- Pseudcraspedia sodis Dyar, 1914 (from Trinidad)
