= Acremma =

Scientific classification
- Domain: Eukaryota
- Kingdom: Animalia
- Phylum: Arthropoda
- Class: Insecta
- Order: Lepidoptera
- Superfamily: Noctuoidea
- Family: Erebidae
- Subfamily: Boletobiinae
- Genus: Acremma; Berio, 1959

Genus of moths

Acremma is a genus of moths of the family Erebidae. The genus was erected by Emilio Berio in 1959.

== Species ==
From Africa:

- Acremma albipoda Berio, 1959
- Acremma chalcochra Hacker, Fiebig & Stadie, 2019
- Acremma clatrata Hacker, Fiebig & Stadie, 2019
- Acremma funebris (Viette, 1962)
- Acremma ingens (Viette, 1988)
- Acremma knudlarseni Hacker & Schreier, 2019
- Acremma macrophaea Hacker, Fiebig & Stadie, 2019
- Acremma neona (Viette, 1962)
- Acremma rhodophaea Hacker, Fiebig & Stadie, 2019
- Acremma roseocrea (Viette, 1962)
- Acremma subindicata (Kenrick, 1917)
- Acremma thyridoides (Kenrick, 1917)
- Acremma transalbipoda Hacker, Fiebig & Stadie, 2019
