= Taraconica aurea =

Scientific classification
- Kingdom: Animalia
- Phylum: Arthropoda
- Class: Insecta
- Order: Lepidoptera
- Superfamily: Noctuoidea
- Family: Erebidae
- Genus: Taraconica
- Species: T. aurea

Binomial name
- Taraconica aurea Viette, 1968

Species of moth

Taraconica aurea is a species of moth of the family Erebidae. It is found in Southern Madagascar.

The wingspan of the adult moths is 21–22 mm.
