= Parolulis =

Scientific classification
- Kingdom: Animalia
- Phylum: Arthropoda
- Class: Insecta
- Order: Lepidoptera
- Superfamily: Noctuoidea
- Family: Erebidae
- Subfamily: Boletobiinae
- Genus: Parolulis; Hampson, 1926

Genus of moths

Parolulis is a genus of moths of the family Erebidae.

== Taxonomy ==
The genus has previously been classified in the subfamily Calpinae of the family Noctuidae.

== Species ==
- Parolulis olivescens Hampson, 1907
- Parolulis renalis Moore, 1885
