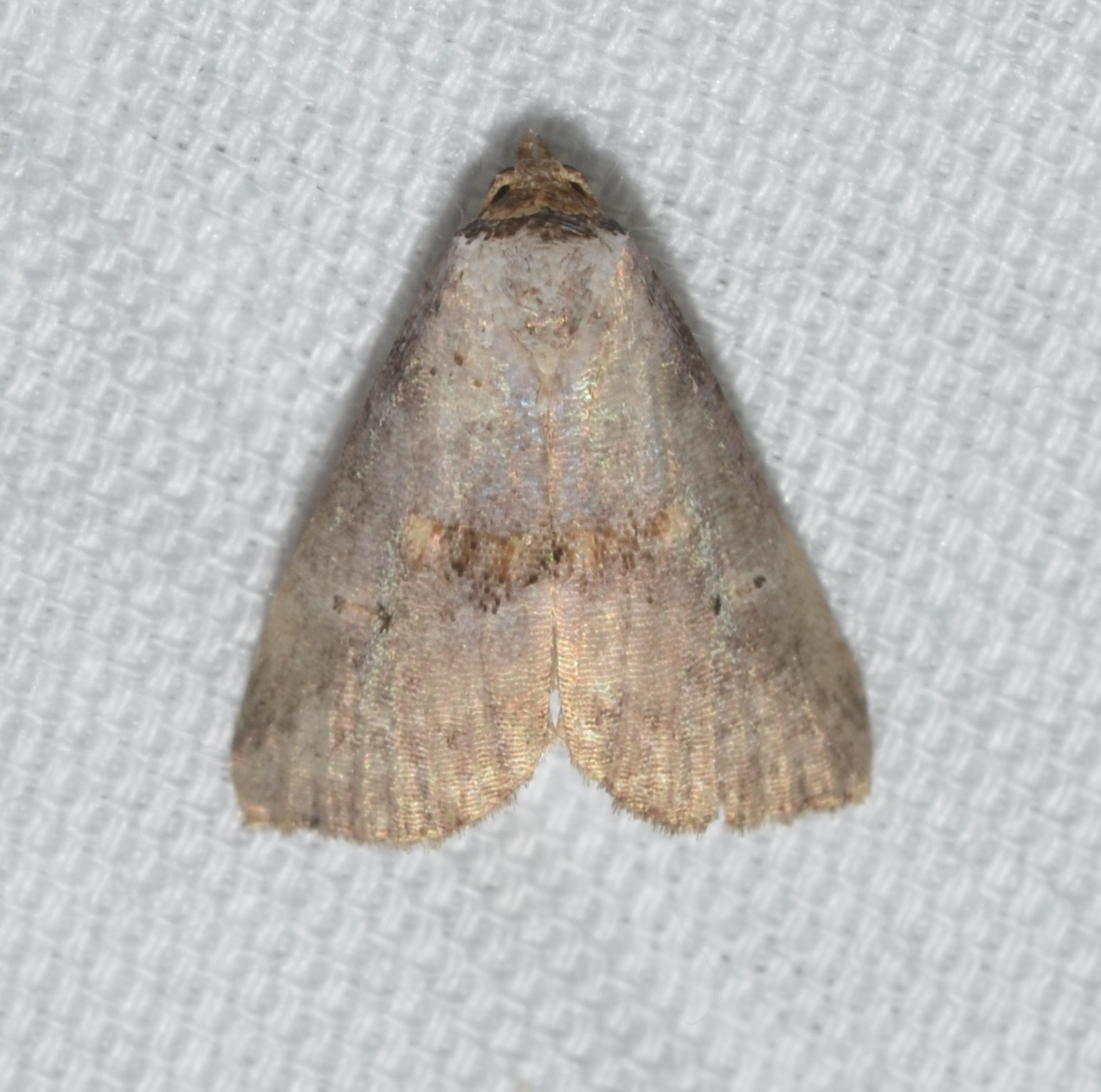

Scientific classification
- Domain: Eukaryota
- Kingdom: Animalia
- Phylum: Arthropoda
- Class: Insecta
- Order: Lepidoptera
- Superfamily: Noctuoidea
- Family: Erebidae
- Genus: Hyperstrotia
- Species: H. flaviguttata

Binomial name
- Hyperstrotia flaviguttata (Grote, 1882)

= Hyperstrotia flaviguttata =

Species of moth

Hyperstrotia flaviguttata, the yellow-spotted graylet, is a moth in the family Erebidae. The species was first described by Augustus Radcliffe Grote in 1882.

The MONA or Hodges number for Hyperstrotia flaviguttata is 9039.
