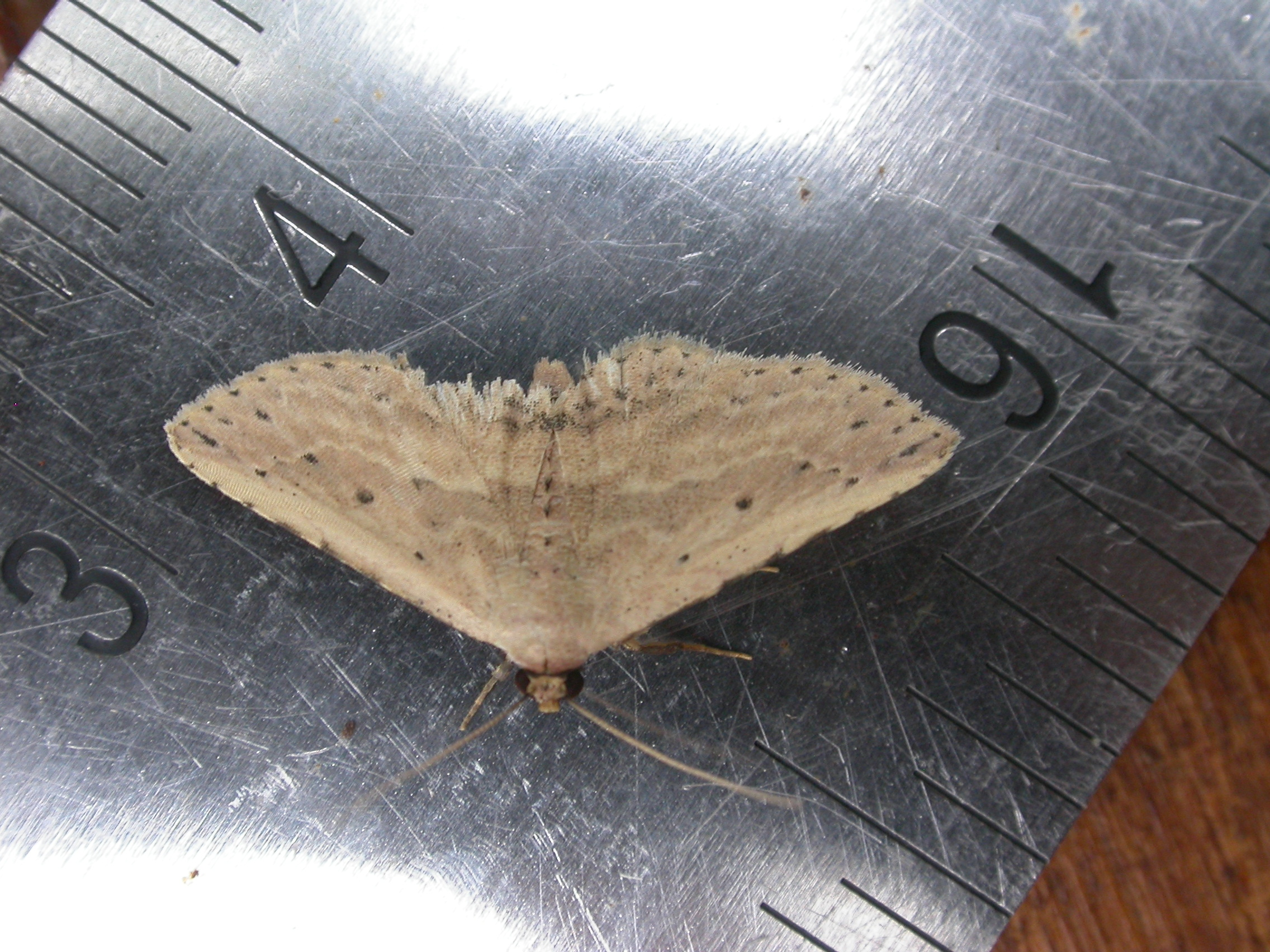
- Hyposada aspersa

Scientific classification
- Kingdom: Animalia
- Phylum: Arthropoda
- Class: Insecta
- Order: Lepidoptera
- Superfamily: Noctuoidea
- Family: Erebidae
- Subfamily: Boletobiinae
- Genus: Hyposada; Hampson, 1910

Type species
- Hyposada postvittata (Moore, 1887)

Species
- See text

= Hyposada =

Genus of moths

Hyposada is a genus of moths of the family Erebidae.

== Species ==
- Hyposada addescens (Swinhoe, 1901) (from Australia)
- Hyposada aspersa (Turner, 1945) (from Australia)
- Hyposada assimilis Warren, 1914 (from Taiwan)
- Hyposada astona (Swinhoe, 1901) (from Borneo)
- Hyposada brunnea (Leech, 1900) (from Japan)
- Hyposada carneotincta Hampson, 1918 (from Malawi)
- Hyposada devia Hampson, 1918 (from New Guinea)
- Hyposada effectaria de Joannis, 1928 (from Vietnam)
- Hyposada erubescens Warren, 1913 (from Borneo)
- Hyposada fasciosa (Moore, 1888) (from India)
- Hyposada hirashimai Sugi, Sugi, Kuroko, Moriuti & Kawabe, 1982 (Japan, Hong Kong)
- Hyposada hydrocampata (Guenée, 1857) (Africa, India, Australia)
- Hyposada ineffectaria (Walker, 1861) (from Borneo)
- Hyposada juncturalis (Walker, [1866]) (from Sierra Leone)
- Hyposada kadooriensis Galsworthy, 1998 (from Hong Kong)
- Hyposada leucoma de Joannis, 1928 (from Vietnam)
- Hyposada melanosticta Hampson, 1910 (from Nigeria)
- Hyposada niveipuncta Warren, 1913 (from India)
- Hyposada pallidicosta Warren, 1913 (from India)
- Hyposada postvittata (Moore, 1887)(from Sri Lanka, Australia)
- Hyposada ruptifascia (Moore, 1888) (from India)
- Hyposada tritonia (Hampson, 1898) (from India)
- Hyposada zavattarii Berio, 1944 (from Ethiopia)
