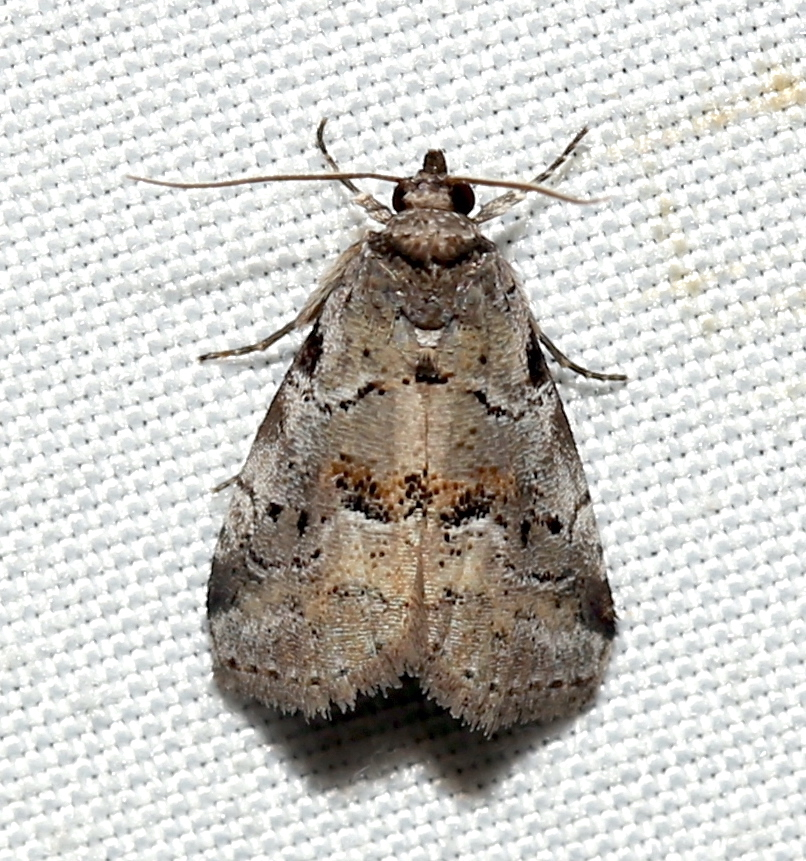

Scientific classification
- Kingdom: Animalia
- Phylum: Arthropoda
- Class: Insecta
- Order: Lepidoptera
- Superfamily: Noctuoidea
- Family: Erebidae
- Genus: Hyperstrotia
- Species: H. aetheria

Binomial name
- Hyperstrotia aetheria (Grote, 1879)

= Hyperstrotia aetheria =

Species of moth

Hyperstrotia aetheria is a species of moth in the family Erebidae. It is found in North America.

The MONA or Hodges number for Hyperstrotia aetheria is 9036.
