= Pseudcraspedia punctata =

Scientific classification
- Kingdom: Animalia
- Phylum: Arthropoda
- Class: Insecta
- Order: Lepidoptera
- Superfamily: Noctuoidea
- Family: Erebidae
- Genus: Pseudcraspedia
- Species: P. punctata

Binomial name
- Pseudcraspedia punctata Hampson, 1898

Species of moth

Pseudcraspedia punctata is a species of moth of the family Erebidae first described by George Hampson in 1898. It is found in Asia including Sikkim & Karnataka, Kenya, Mauritius, Réunion, Uganda and Australia.

This species has a wingspan of 14 mm.
