= Mycterophora inexplicata =

Scientific classification
- Kingdom: Animalia
- Phylum: Arthropoda
- Class: Insecta
- Order: Lepidoptera
- Superfamily: Noctuoidea
- Family: Erebidae
- Genus: Mycterophora
- Species: M. inexplicata

Binomial name
- Mycterophora inexplicata (Walker, 1863)

Species of moth

Mycterophora inexplicata, the pale-edged snout moth, is a species of moth in the family Erebidae. It is found in North America.

The MONA or Hodges number for Mycterophora inexplicata is 8413.
