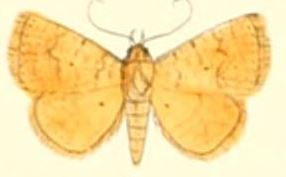

Scientific classification
- Domain: Eukaryota
- Kingdom: Animalia
- Phylum: Arthropoda
- Class: Insecta
- Order: Lepidoptera
- Superfamily: Noctuoidea
- Family: Erebidae
- Genus: Raparna
- Species: R. ochreipennis

Binomial name
- Raparna ochreipennis Moore, 1882

Synonyms
- Asthena querula C. Swinhoe, 1886; Raparna undulata Moore, 1882

= Raparna ochreipennis =

Species of moth

Raparna ochreipennis is a species of moth of the family Erebidae first described by Frederic Moore in 1882.

== Distribution ==
It is found in India and Nepal.
