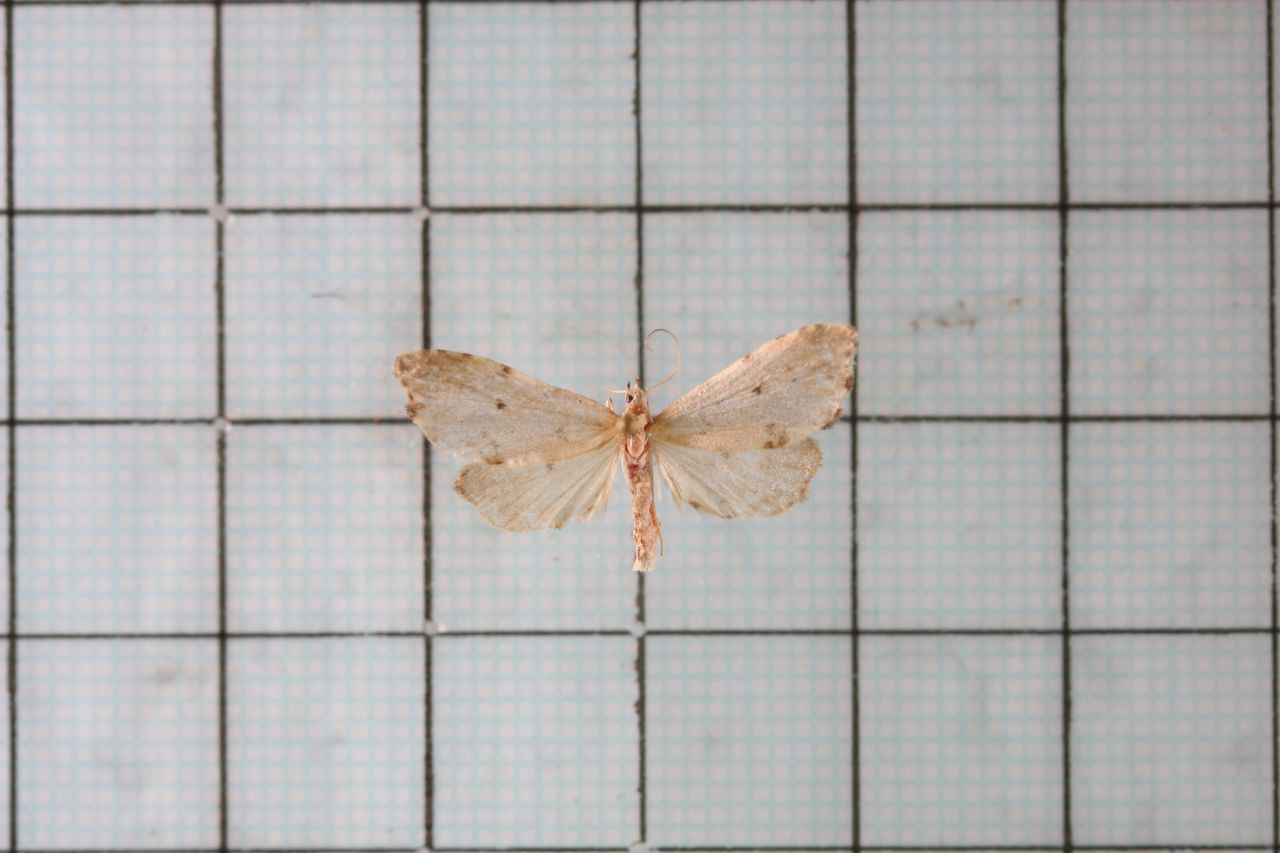
- Metaemene hampsoni

Scientific classification
- Kingdom: Animalia
- Phylum: Arthropoda
- Class: Insecta
- Order: Lepidoptera
- Superfamily: Noctuoidea
- Family: Erebidae
- Subfamily: Boletobiinae
- Genus: Metaemene; Hampson, 1910

= Metaemene =

Genus of moths

Metaemene is a genus of moths of the family Erebidae. The genus was erected by George Hampson in 1910.

== Taxonomy ==
The genus has previously been classified in the subfamily Acontiinae of the family Noctuidae.

== Species ==
- Metaemene atrigutta (Walker, 1862)
- Metaemene atropunctata (Pagenstecher, 1896)
- Metaemene baliochraspedus Rothschild, 1920
- Metaemene hampsoni Wileman, 1914
- Metaemene karenkonis (Matsumura, 1930)
