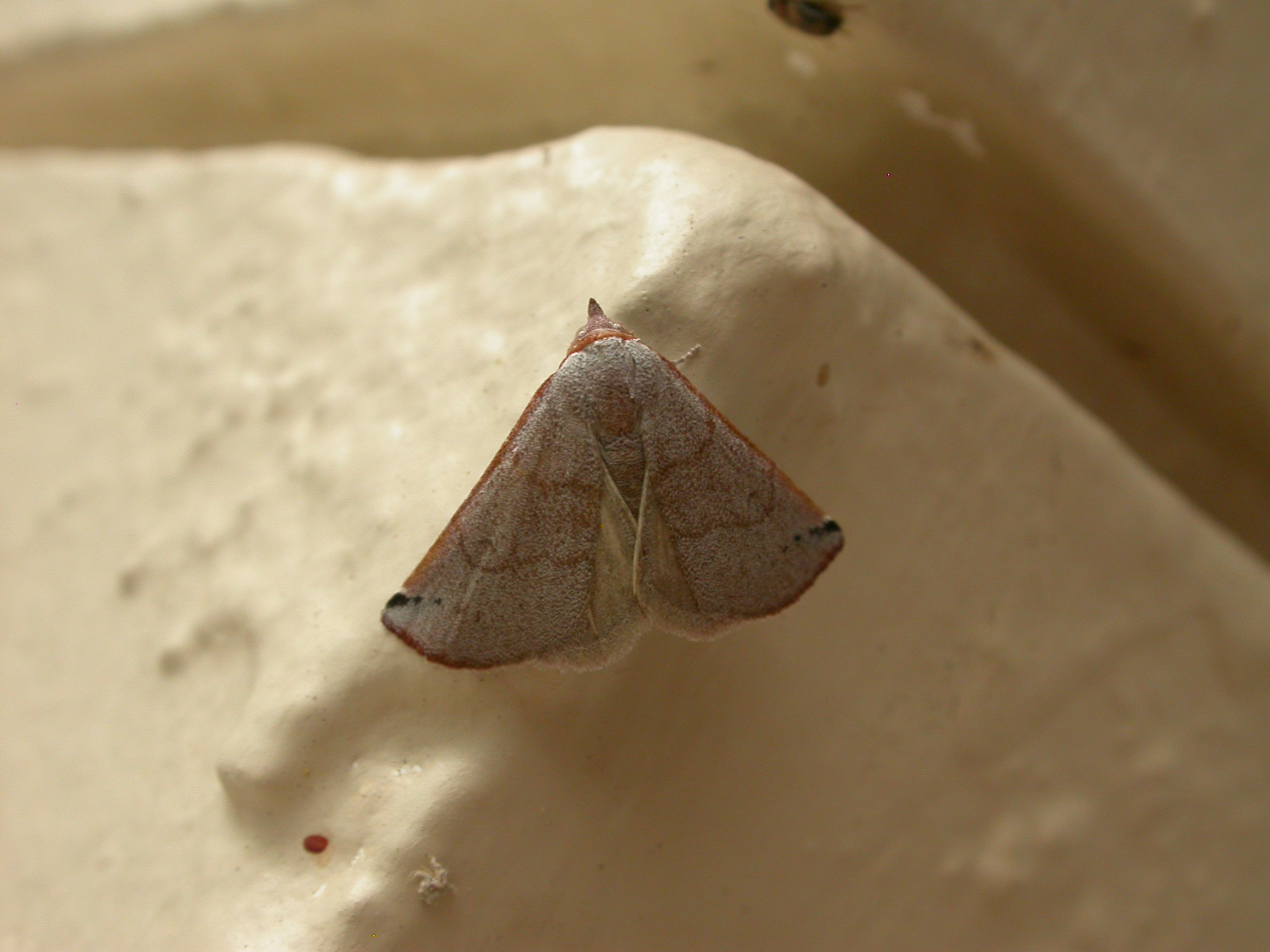

Scientific classification
- Kingdom: Animalia
- Phylum: Arthropoda
- Class: Insecta
- Order: Lepidoptera
- Superfamily: Noctuoidea
- Family: Erebidae
- Genus: Mataeomera
- Species: M. ligata

Binomial name
- Mataeomera ligata T. P. Lucas, 1895

= Mataeomera ligata =

Species of moth

Mataeomera ligata is a species of moth of the family Erebidae first described by Thomas Pennington Lucas in 1895. It is found in Australia.
