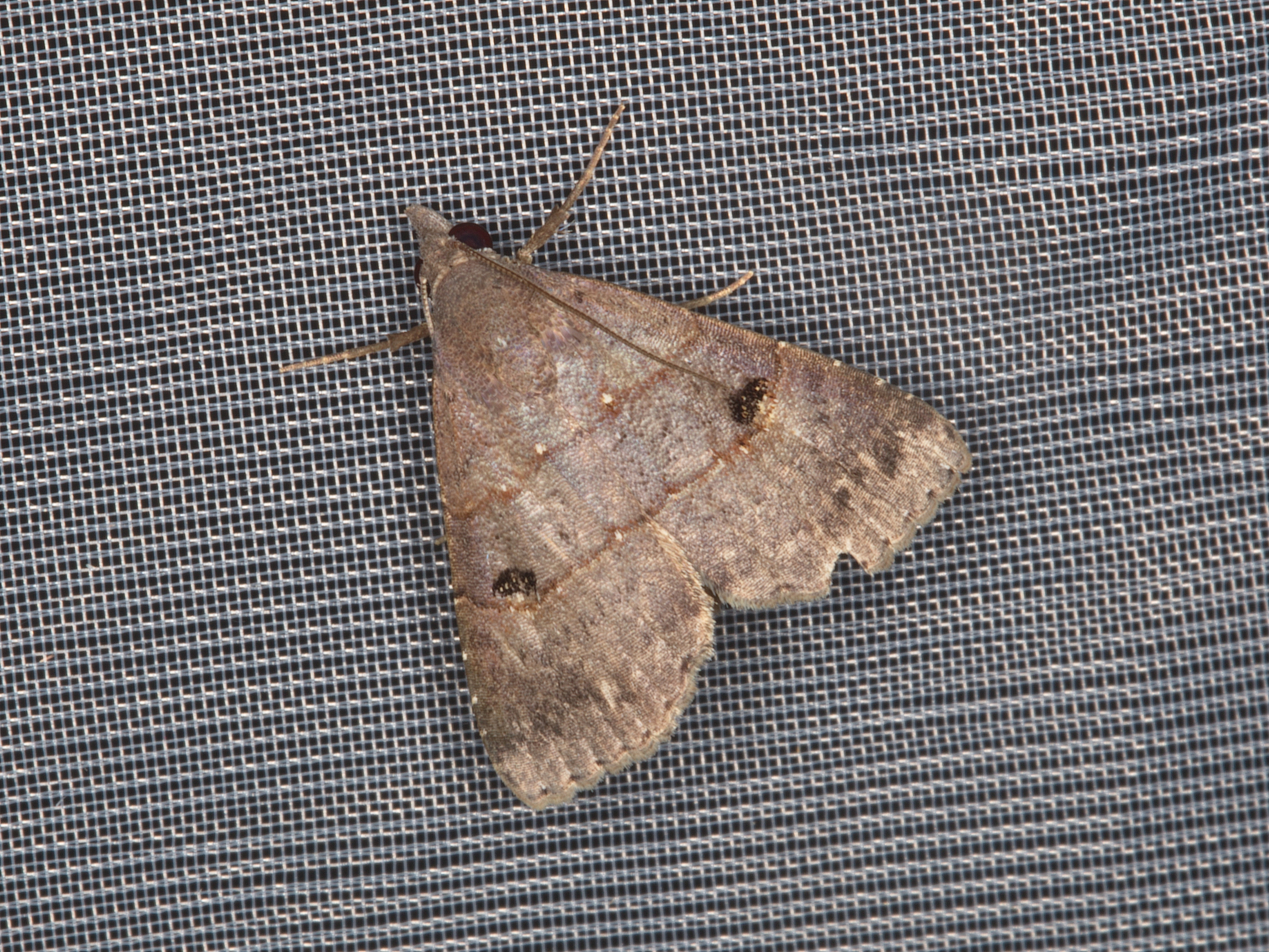

Scientific classification
- Kingdom: Animalia
- Phylum: Arthropoda
- Class: Insecta
- Order: Lepidoptera
- Superfamily: Noctuoidea
- Family: Erebidae
- Genus: Hormoschista; Möschler, 1890
- Species: H. latipalpis

Binomial name
- Hormoschista latipalpis (Walker, 1858)

= Hormoschista =

Genus of moths

Hormoschista is a monotypic moth genus of the family Erebidae described by Heinrich Benno Möschler in 1890. Its single species, Hormoschista latipalpis, the double-lined brown moth, was first described by Francis Walker in 1858. It is found in eastern North America and the Caribbean.

== Taxonomy ==
The genus has previously been classified in the subfamily Phytometrinae within Erebidae or in the subfamily Acontiinae of the family Noctuidae.
