= Marca =

Marca may refer to:

== Places ==
- Marca, Sălaj, a commune in Sălaj County, Romania
- Marca, a tributary of the Barcău in Sălaj County, Romania
- an alternative name for Merca, Somalia
- Marca District, in the province Recuay, Peru
- Marçà, a village of about 600 near Falset, Tarragona, Catalonia, Spain
- Eparchy of Marča, historical Orthodox bishopric in Croatia

=== Regions (marches) ===
- Marca is the Latin term for border regions known as a Marks or Marches
- Marca Aleramica, created in 961 in western Liguria and named after Aleramo
- Marca Anconetana, created in 1198 and centred on Macerata in eastern central Italy
- Marca di Ancona, the March of Ancona, an alternative name for the Marca Anconetana
- Marca Arduinica, or march of Turin, founded in 941 and named after Arduin Glaber
- Marca Geronis, a tenth-century march in Saxony, centred on Merseburg
- Marca Hispanica, or Spanish March, or March of Barcelona, created in 795
- Marca Januensis, centred on Genoa, an alternative name for the Marca Obertenga
- Marca Obertenga, created in 961 in eastern Liguria and named after Oberto I
- Marca Trevigiana, or March of Treviso, a medieval territory in Venetia
- Marca Veronensis et Aquileiensis, or March of Verona, created after 945 and centred on Verona and Aquileia

== People ==
- Conrad Marca-Relli (1913–2000), an American artist

== Biology ==
- Marca (moth), a genus of moths of the family Erebidae
- Marca's marmoset, marmoset species endemic to Brazil

== Other uses ==
- Marca, another name for Genfo, a porridge dish
- Marca (newspaper), a Spanish daily sports newspaper
- Marca da bollo, an Italian revenue stamp
- Marca registrada, Spanish and Portuguese term for trademark
- Marca-Tre-Spade, an Italian automobile manufactured from 1908 until 1911
- Marca Trevigiana Calcio a 5, a futsal club from Castelfranco Veneto, Italy.

== See also ==
- Marka (disambiguation)
