= Homocerynea =

Scientific classification
- Domain: Eukaryota
- Kingdom: Animalia
- Phylum: Arthropoda
- Class: Insecta
- Order: Lepidoptera
- Superfamily: Noctuoidea
- Family: Erebidae
- Genus: Homocerynea; Barnes & McDunnough, 1913
- Species: H. cleoriformis

Binomial name
- Homocerynea cleoriformis Barnes & McDunnough, 1913

Genus of moths

Homocerynea is a monotypic moth genus of the family Erebidae. Its only species, Homocerynea cleoriformis, was found in the US state of Arizona. Both the genus and species were erected by William Barnes and James Halliday McDunnough in 1913.

== Taxonomy ==
The genus has previously been classified in the subfamily Phytometrinae within Erebidae or in the subfamily Acontiinae of the family Noctuidae.
