= Aglaonice (moth) =

Scientific classification
- Domain: Eukaryota
- Kingdom: Animalia
- Phylum: Arthropoda
- Class: Insecta
- Order: Lepidoptera
- Superfamily: Noctuoidea
- Family: Erebidae
- Subfamily: Boletobiinae
- Genus: Aglaonice; Möschler, 1890

Synonyms
- Metina H. Druce, 1890

Genus of moths

Aglaonice is a genus of moths of the family Erebidae. The genus was erected by Heinrich Benno Möschler in 1890.

== Taxonomy ==
The genus has been previously classified in the subfamily Phytometrinae of Erebidae or in the family Noctuidae.

== Species ==
- Aglaonice hirtipalpis (Walker, [1859])
- Aglaonice otignatha Hampson, 1924
