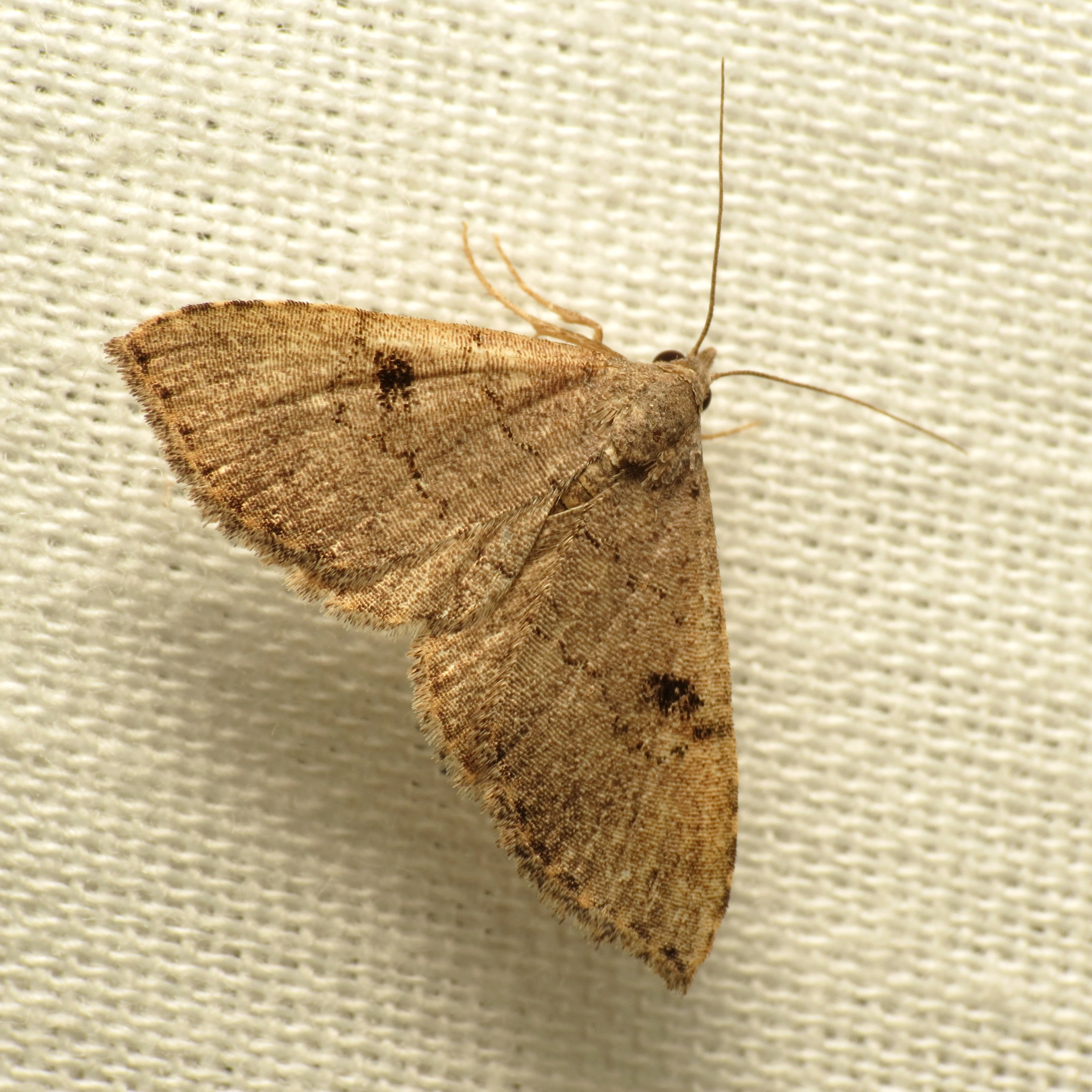

Scientific classification
- Kingdom: Animalia
- Phylum: Arthropoda
- Clade: Pancrustacea
- Class: Insecta
- Order: Lepidoptera
- Superfamily: Noctuoidea
- Family: Erebidae
- Genus: Nychioptera
- Species: N. noctuidalis

Binomial name
- Nychioptera noctuidalis (Dyar, 1907)

= Nychioptera noctuidalis =

Species of moth

Nychioptera noctuidalis is a moth in the family Erebidae. The species was first described by Harrison Gray Dyar Jr. in 1907. It is found in North America.
