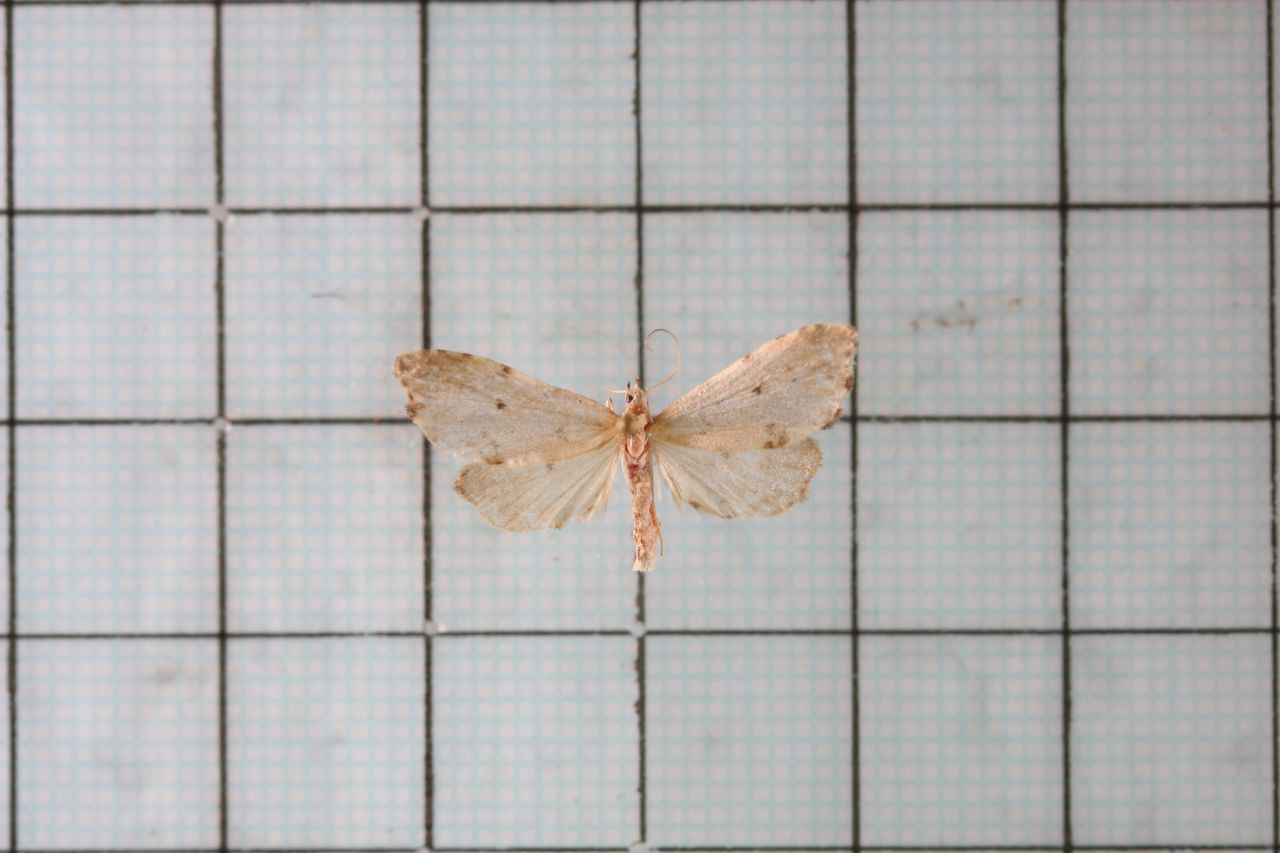

Scientific classification
- Kingdom: Animalia
- Phylum: Arthropoda
- Clade: Pancrustacea
- Class: Insecta
- Order: Lepidoptera
- Superfamily: Noctuoidea
- Family: Erebidae
- Genus: Metaemene
- Species: M. hampsoni

Binomial name
- Metaemene hampsoni Wileman, 1914

Synonyms
- Parasiccia karenkonis Matsumura, 1930

= Metaemene hampsoni =

Species of moth

Metaemene hampsoni is a species of moth in the family Erebidae. It is found in Taiwan.

The wingspan is 16–28 mm.
