= Euaontia semirufa =

Scientific classification
- Domain: Eukaryota
- Kingdom: Animalia
- Phylum: Arthropoda
- Class: Insecta
- Order: Lepidoptera
- Superfamily: Noctuoidea
- Family: Erebidae
- Genus: Euaontia
- Species: E. semirufa

Binomial name
- Euaontia semirufa Barnes & McDunnough, 1910

Species of moth

Euaontia semirufa is a species of moth in the family Erebidae. It was first described by William Barnes and James Halliday McDunnough in 1910 and it is found in North America.

The MONA or Hodges number for Euaontia semirufa is 8567.
