= Glympis =

Scientific classification
- Kingdom: Animalia
- Phylum: Arthropoda
- Class: Insecta
- Order: Lepidoptera
- Superfamily: Noctuoidea
- Family: Erebidae
- Subfamily: Boletobiinae
- Genus: Glympis; Walker, 1859

Synonyms
- Ecregma Walker, 1859; Aluaca Walker, [1866]; Perta Walker, [1866]

Genus of moths

Glympis is a genus of moths of the family Erebidae. The genus was erected by Francis Walker in 1859.

== Taxonomy ==
The genus has previously been classified in the subfamily Phytometrinae within Erebidae or in the subfamily Calpinae of the family Noctuidae.

== Species ==
- Glympis arenalis (Walker, [1866]) Dominican Republic
- Glympis brunneigrisea Hampson, 1926 Paraguay
- Glympis concors (Hübner, 1823) Texas, Puerto Rico, Guatemala, Colombia, Suriname
- Glympis damoetesalis (Walker, [1859]) Venezuela
- Glympis eubolialis (Walker, [1866]) Antilles
- Glympis holothermes Hampson, 1926 Jamaica, Florida
- Glympis nigripuncta Hampson, 1926 Brazil
- Glympis phaeotherma Hampson, 1926 Paraguay
- Glympis poliophaea Hampson, 1926 Brazil
- Glympis subterminalis Hampson, 1924 Trinidad
