= Euaontia =

Scientific classification
- Domain: Eukaryota
- Kingdom: Animalia
- Phylum: Arthropoda
- Class: Insecta
- Order: Lepidoptera
- Superfamily: Noctuoidea
- Family: Erebidae
- Subfamily: Boletobiinae
- Genus: Euaontia; Barnes & McDunnough, 1910

Genus of moths

Euaontia is a genus of moths of the family Erebidae.

== Taxonomy ==
The genus has previously been classified in the subfamily Phytometrinae within Erebidae or in the subfamily Acontiinae of the family Noctuidae.

== Species ==
- Euaontia clarki Barnes & McDunnough, 1916
- Euaontia semirufa Barnes & McDunnough, 1910
