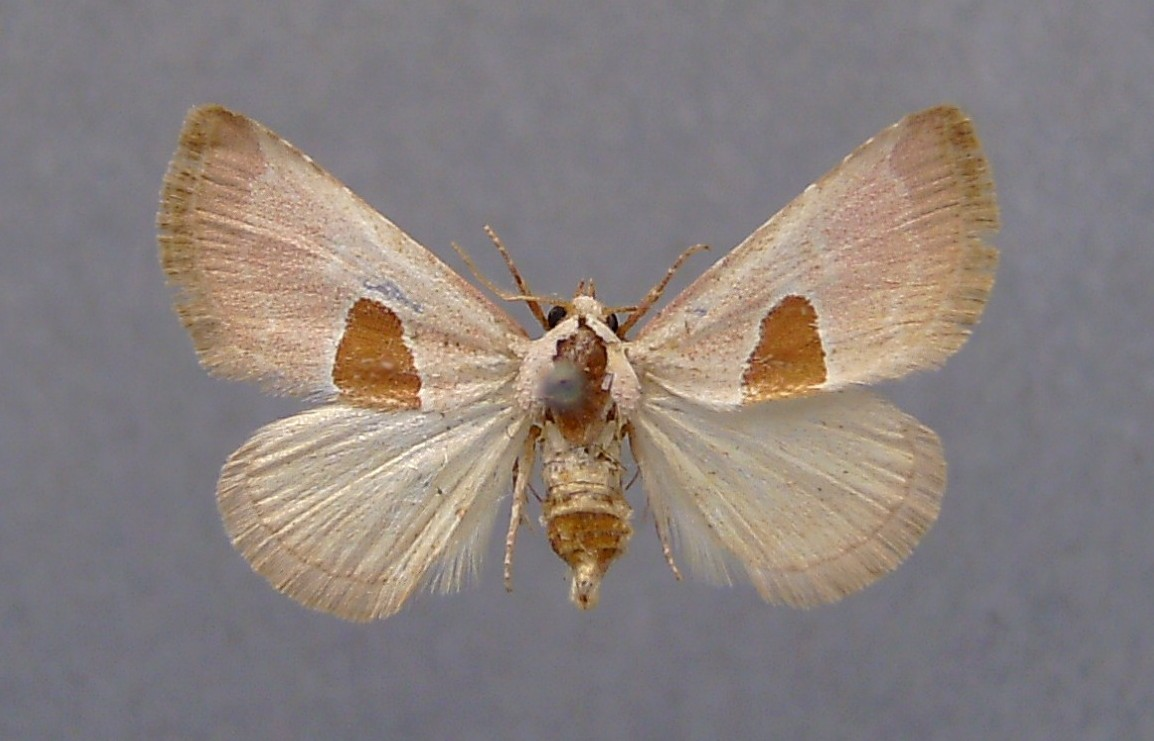

Scientific classification
- Kingdom: Animalia
- Phylum: Arthropoda
- Clade: Pancrustacea
- Class: Insecta
- Order: Lepidoptera
- Superfamily: Noctuoidea
- Family: Erebidae
- Genus: Calymma; Hübner, [1823]
- Species: C. communimacula

Binomial name
- Calymma communimacula (Denis & Schiffermüller, 1775)

Synonyms
- Generic: Oratoscelis Guenée, 1841; Horatoscelis Agassiz, [1847]; Specific: Noctua communimacula Denis & Schiffermüller, 1775; Thalpochares communimacula cinnamomea Turati, 1911; Calymma communimacula gracilis Osthelder, 1933

= Calymma =

Genus and species of moth

Calymma is a monotypic genus of moth in the family Erebidae erected by Jacob Hübner in 1823. Its single species, Calymma communimacula, was first described by Michael Denis and Ignaz Schiffermüller in 1775. It is found in central and southern Europe and from Turkey to Transcaucasia and the Middle East.

== Taxonomy ==
The genus has previously been classified in the subfamily Eublemminae of Erebidae or the subfamily Acontiinae of the family Noctuidae.
