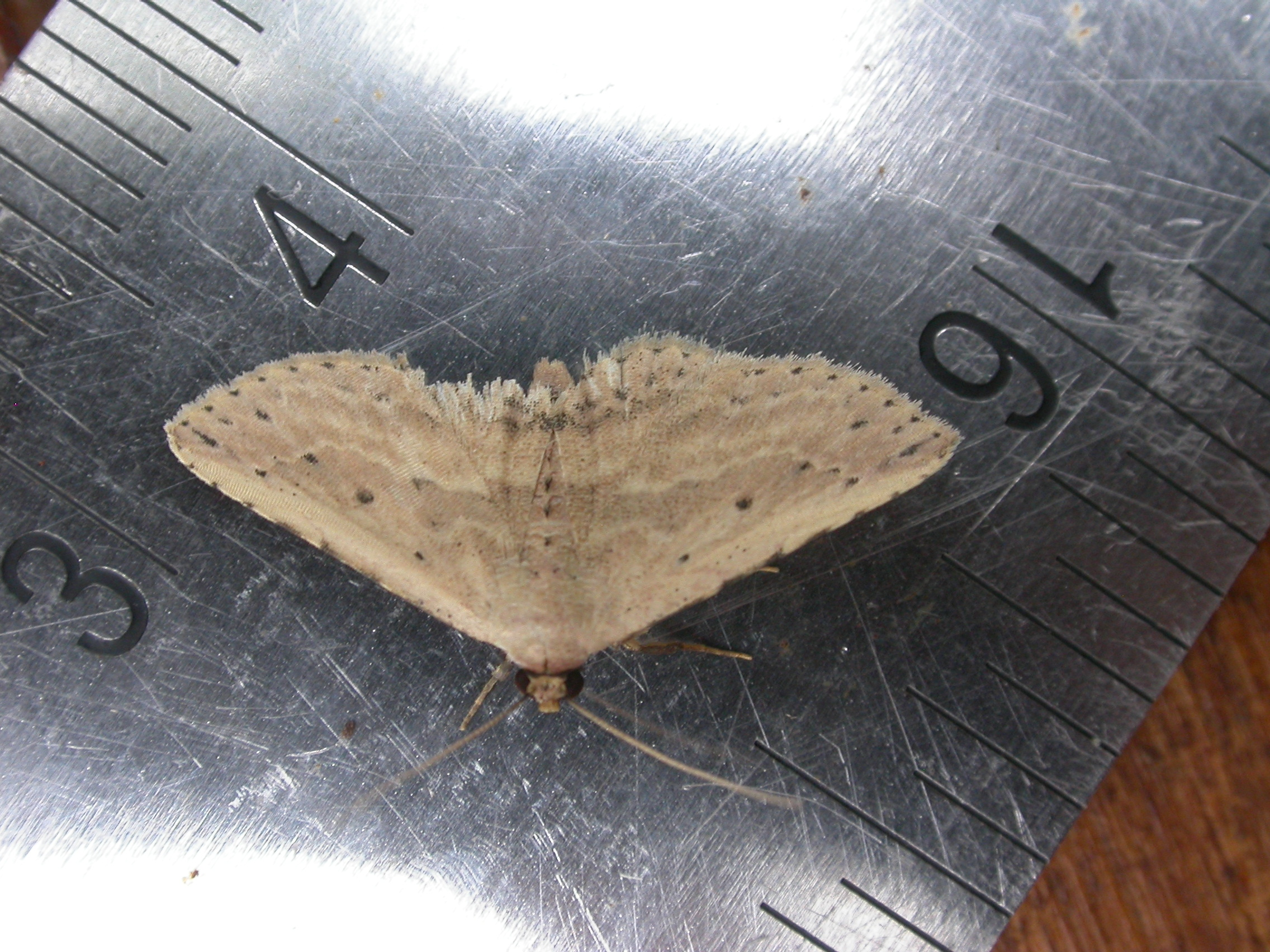

Scientific classification
- Domain: Eukaryota
- Kingdom: Animalia
- Phylum: Arthropoda
- Class: Insecta
- Order: Lepidoptera
- Superfamily: Noctuoidea
- Family: Erebidae
- Genus: Hyposada
- Species: H. aspersa

Binomial name
- Hyposada aspersa (Turner, 1945)

Synonyms
- Oruza aspersa Turner, 1945

= Hyposada aspersa =

Species of moth

Hyposada aspersa is a species of moth of the family Noctuidae first described by Turner in 1945. It is found in Queensland, Australia.
