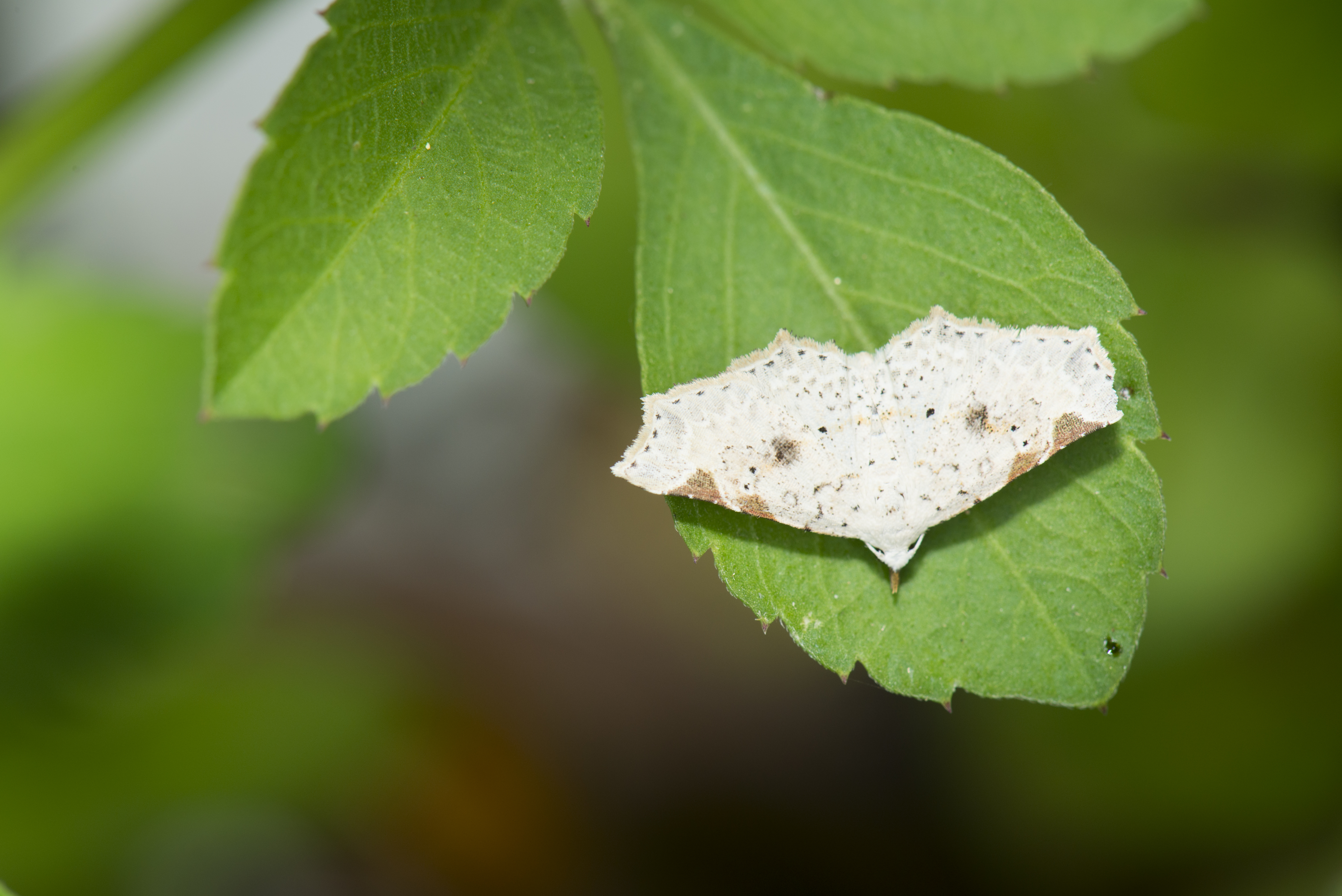
- Prolophota trigonifera

Scientific classification
- Kingdom: Animalia
- Phylum: Arthropoda
- Class: Insecta
- Order: Lepidoptera
- Superfamily: Noctuoidea
- Family: Erebidae
- Subfamily: Boletobiinae
- Genus: Prolophota; Hampson, 1896

= Prolophota =

Genus of moths

Prolophota is a genus of moths of the family Erebidae. The genus was erected by George Hampson in 1896.

== Taxonomy ==
The genus has previously been classified in the subfamily Calpinae of the family Noctuidae.

== Species ==
- Prolophota pallida Turner, 1936
- Prolophota trigonifera Hampson, 1896
