= Allerastria =

Scientific classification
- Kingdom: Animalia
- Phylum: Arthropoda
- Clade: Pancrustacea
- Class: Insecta
- Order: Lepidoptera
- Superfamily: Noctuoidea
- Family: Erebidae
- Subfamily: Boletobiinae
- Genus: Allerastria; Brown, 1987

Genus of moths

Allerastria is a genus of moths of the family Erebidae.

== Taxonomy ==
The genus has previously been classified in the subfamily Phytometrinae within Erebidae or in the subfamily Acontiinae of the family Noctuidae.

== Species ==
- Allerastria albiciliatus (Smith, 1903)
- Allerastria annae Brown, 1987
