= Prosoparia =

Scientific classification
- Kingdom: Animalia
- Phylum: Arthropoda
- Class: Insecta
- Order: Lepidoptera
- Superfamily: Noctuoidea
- Family: Erebidae
- Subfamily: Boletobiinae
- Genus: Prosoparia; Grote, 1883

Synonyms
- Friesia Barnes & McDunnough, 1912

Genus of moths

Prosoparia is a genus of moths of the family Erebidae. The genus was erected by Augustus Radcliffe Grote in 1883.

== Taxonomy ==
The genus has previously been classified in the subfamily Calpinae of the family Noctuidae.

== Species ==
- Prosoparia anormalis (Barnes & McDunnough, 1912) Arizona
- Prosoparia annuligera (Dognin, 1914) Colombia
- Prosoparia estella (Jones, 1912) Brazil (São Paulo)
- Prosoparia floridana Lafontaine & Dickel, 2009 Florida
- Prosoparia funerea (Schaus, 1904) Brazil (Parana)
- Prosoparia juno (Jones, 1912) Brazil (Rio de Janeiro)
- Prosoparia marginata (Schaus, 1916) Suriname, French Guiana
- Prosoparia micraster (Dognin, 1914) Colombia
- Prosoparia nivosita (Schaus, 1904) Brazil (Parana)
- Prosoparia perfuscaria Grote, 1883 Arizona
- Prosoparia pygmaea (Schaus, 1916) French Guiana
- Prosoparia rugosa (Dyar, 1914) Panama
- Prosoparia tenebrosa (Schaus, 1913) Costa Rica
- Prosoparia turpis (Schaus, 1913) Costa Rica
- Prosoparia variata (Schaus, 1914) Suriname
