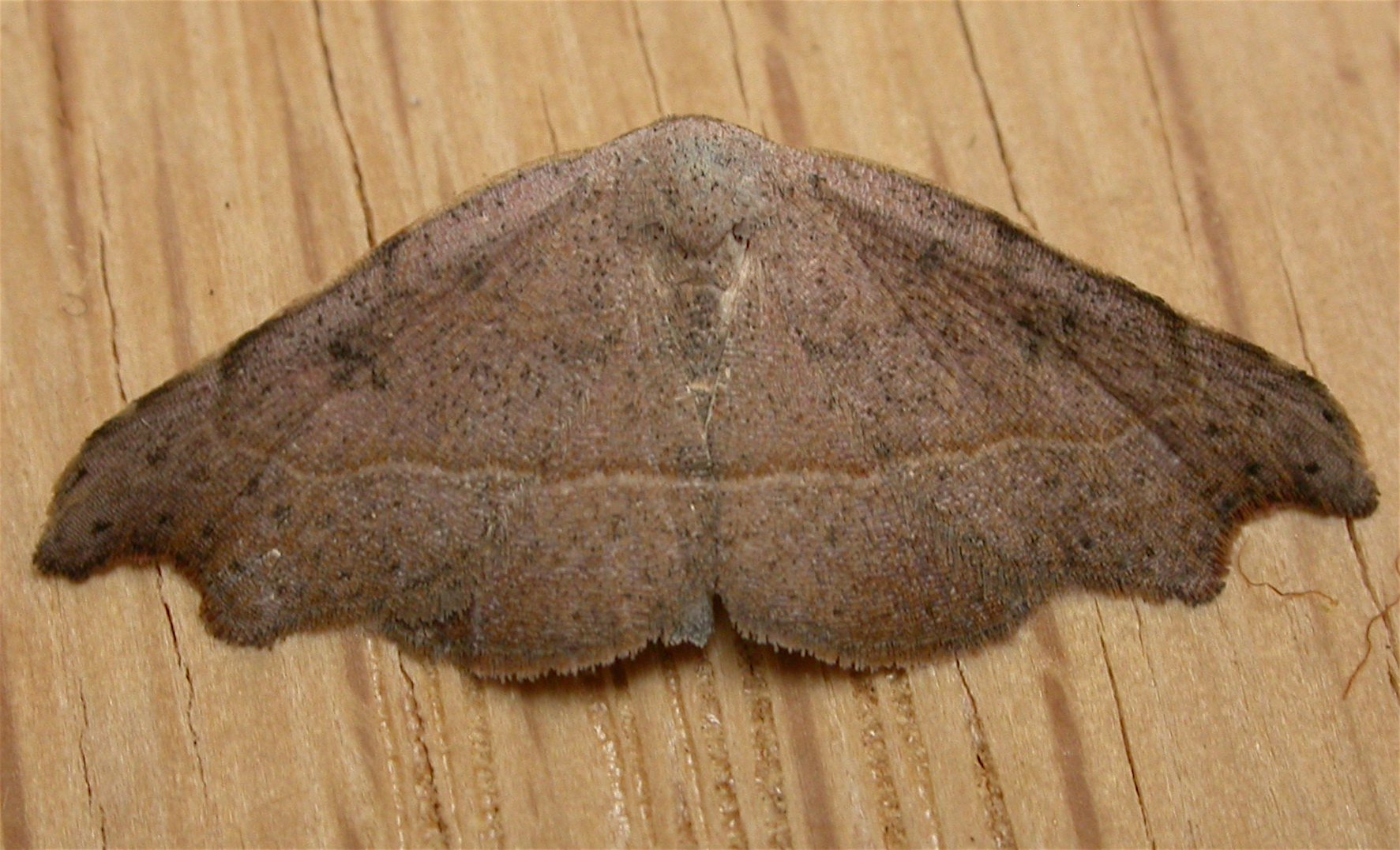

Scientific classification
- Kingdom: Animalia
- Phylum: Arthropoda
- Class: Insecta
- Order: Lepidoptera
- Superfamily: Noctuoidea
- Family: Erebidae
- Tribe: Aventiini
- Genus: Sophta; Walker, [1863]

= Sophta =

Genus of moths

Sophta is a genus of moths of the subfamily Boletobiinae of the family Erebidae. This genus was erected by Francis Walker in 1863.

== Taxonomy ==
The genus has previously been classified in the subfamily Acontiinae within Noctuidae.

== Species ==
- Sophta adusta Wileman & West, 1929
- Sophta concavata Walker, [1863]
- Sophta hapalopis Turner, 1925
- Sophta poecilota Turner, 1908
- Sophta ruficeps Walker, 1864
