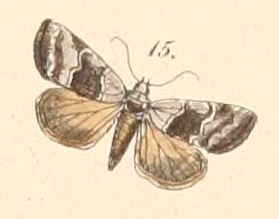

Scientific classification
- Kingdom: Animalia
- Phylum: Arthropoda
- Class: Insecta
- Order: Lepidoptera
- Superfamily: Noctuoidea
- Family: Erebidae
- Subfamily: Boletobiinae
- Genus: Abacena; Walker, 1866

= Abacena =

Genus of moths

Abacena is a genus of moths of the family Erebidae.

== Taxonomy ==
The genus has previously been classified in the subfamily Acontiinae of the family Noctuidae.

== Species ==
- Abacena accincta Felder and Rogenhofer, 1874
- Abacena discalis Walker, 1865 (syn: Abacena palliceps Felder and Rogenhofer, 1874)
- Abacena rectilinea Hampson, 1918
