= Euaontia clarki =

Scientific classification
- Domain: Eukaryota
- Kingdom: Animalia
- Phylum: Arthropoda
- Class: Insecta
- Order: Lepidoptera
- Superfamily: Noctuoidea
- Family: Erebidae
- Genus: Euaontia
- Species: E. clarki

Binomial name
- Euaontia clarki Barnes & McDunnough, 1916

Species of moth

Euaontia clarki is a species of moth in the family Erebidae. It was first described by William Barnes and James Halliday McDunnough in 1916 and it is found in North America.

The MONA or Hodges number for Euaontia clarki is 8568.
