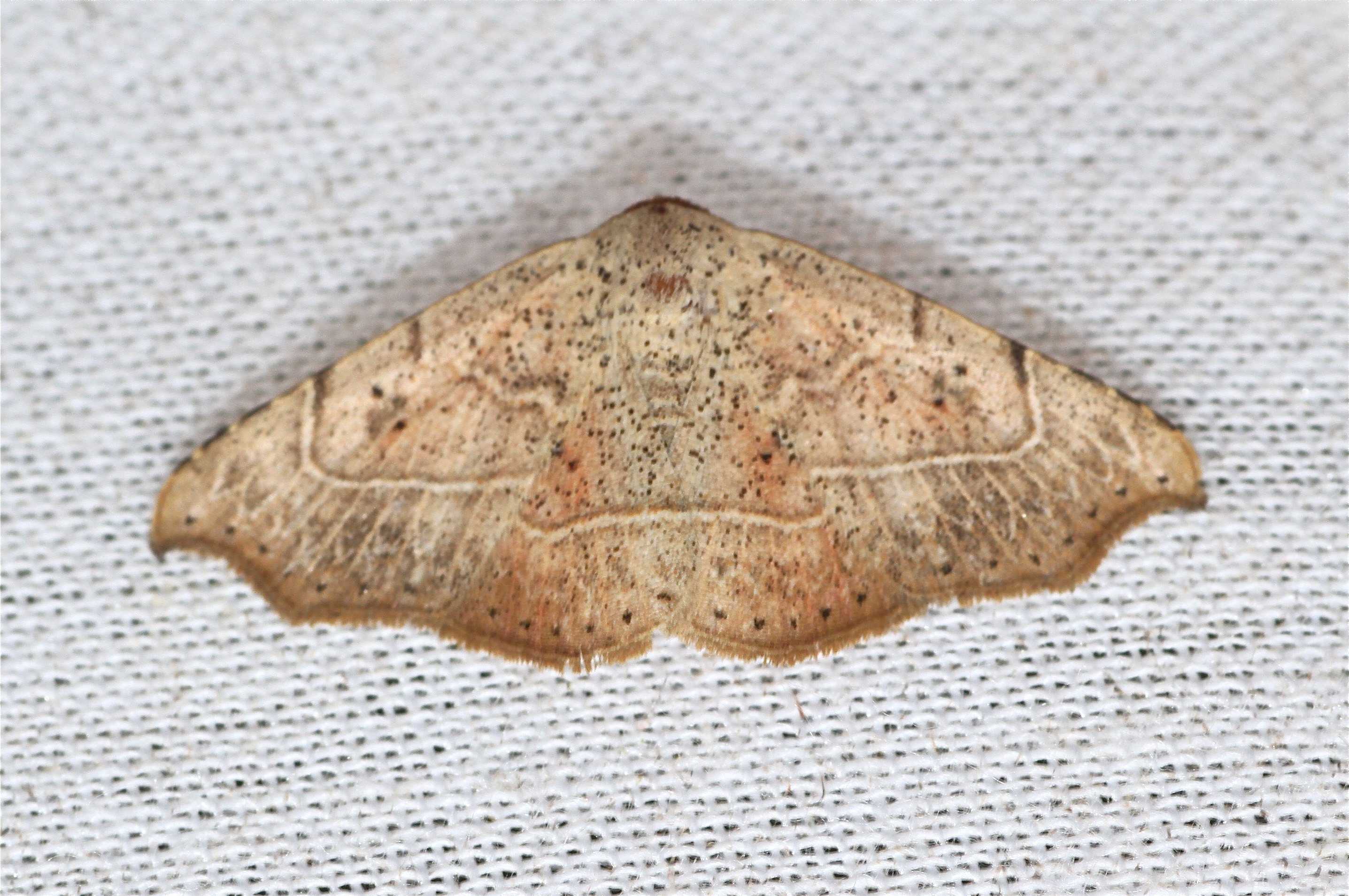

Scientific classification
- Kingdom: Animalia
- Phylum: Arthropoda
- Class: Insecta
- Order: Lepidoptera
- Superfamily: Noctuoidea
- Family: Erebidae
- Genus: Sophta
- Species: S. ruficeps

Binomial name
- Sophta ruficeps (Walker, 1864)

Synonyms
- Laspeyria ruficeps Walker, 1864

= Sophta ruficeps =

Species of moth

Sophta ruficeps is a moth of the family Erebidae first described by Francis Walker in 1864. It is found in Sri Lanka, Korea, Japan, Taiwan and Borneo.
