= Mycterophora longipalpata =

Scientific classification
- Domain: Eukaryota
- Kingdom: Animalia
- Phylum: Arthropoda
- Class: Insecta
- Order: Lepidoptera
- Superfamily: Noctuoidea
- Family: Erebidae
- Genus: Mycterophora
- Species: M. longipalpata

Binomial name
- Mycterophora longipalpata Hulst, 1896

Species of moth

Mycterophora longipalpata, the long-palped mycterophora, is a species of moth in the family Erebidae. It is found in North America.

The MONA or Hodges number for Mycterophora longipalpata is 8415.
