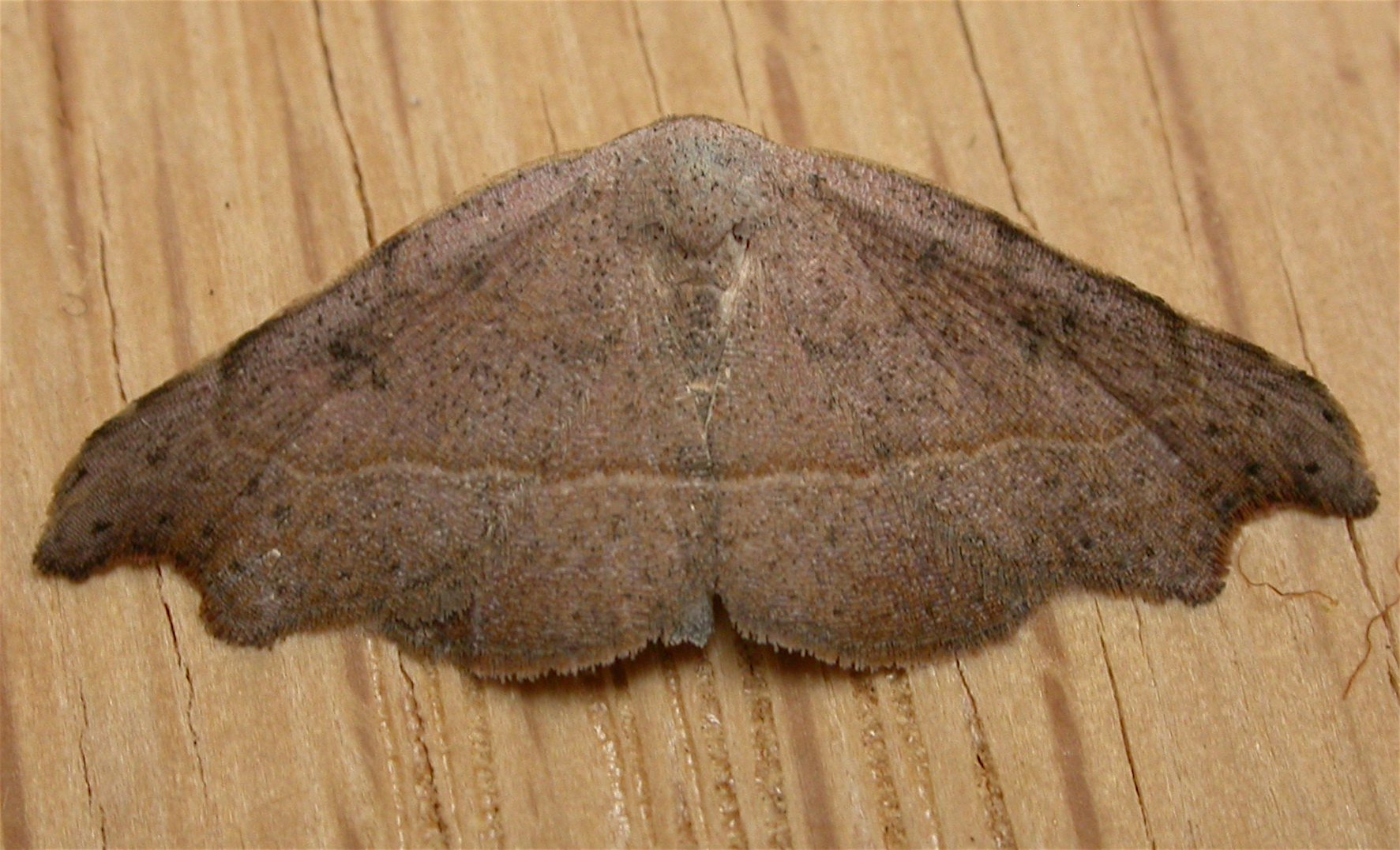

Scientific classification
- Kingdom: Animalia
- Phylum: Arthropoda
- Class: Insecta
- Order: Lepidoptera
- Superfamily: Noctuoidea
- Family: Erebidae
- Genus: Sophta
- Species: S. concavata

Binomial name
- Sophta concavata Walker, 1863

Synonyms
- Laspeyria concavata (Walker, [1863])

= Sophta concavata =

Species of moth

Sophta concavata is a noctuoid moth in the family Erebidae first described by Francis Walker in 1863. It is found in Australia.
