= Aglaonice hirtipalpis =

Scientific classification
- Kingdom: Animalia
- Phylum: Arthropoda
- Clade: Pancrustacea
- Class: Insecta
- Order: Lepidoptera
- Superfamily: Noctuoidea
- Family: Erebidae
- Genus: Aglaonice
- Species: A. hirtipalpis

Binomial name
- Aglaonice hirtipalpis Walker, 1858

Species of moth

Aglaonice hirtipalpis is a species of moth that was first described by Francis Walker in 1858.

== Distribution and habitat ==
Aglaonice hirtipalpis has been found on the land of Central America, but more specifically in Costa Rica, Panama, Venezuela, Mexico, Honduras, Trinidad and Tobago, and in Jamaica. The species is more common in the country of Cuba.
