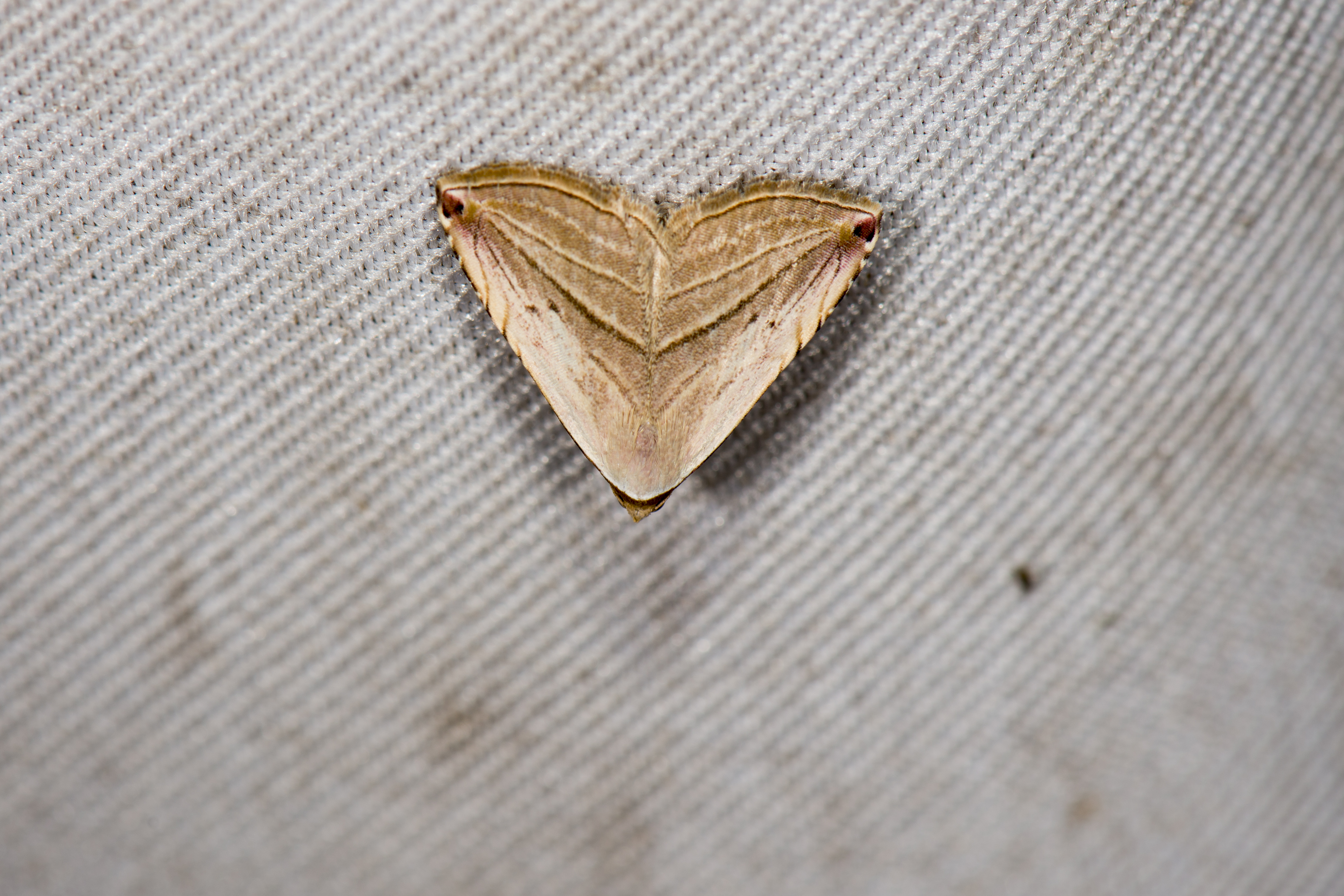
- Image of Honeyania ragusana

Scientific classification
- Kingdom: Animalia
- Phylum: Arthropoda
- Class: Insecta
- Order: Lepidoptera
- Superfamily: Noctuoidea
- Family: Erebidae
- Genus: Honeyania; Berio, 1989
- Species: H. ragusana

Binomial name
- Honeyania ragusana (Freyer, 1845)

= Honeyania =

Genus of moths

Honeyania is a monotypic moth genus in the family Erebidae erected by Emilio Berio in 1989. Its only species, Honeyania ragusana, was first described by Christian Friedrich Freyer in 1845. It is found from south-eastern Europe through Australia.

== Taxonomy ==
The genus has previously been classified in the subfamily Eublemminae of the Erebidae or in the subfamily Acontiinae of the family Noctuidae.
