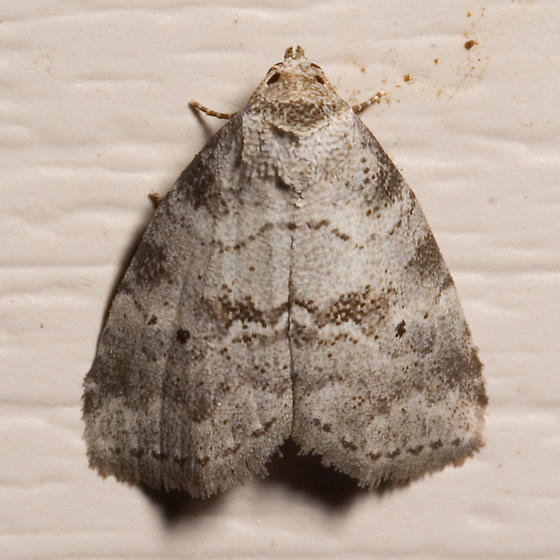
- Hyperstrotia pervertens

Scientific classification
- Kingdom: Animalia
- Phylum: Arthropoda
- Class: Insecta
- Order: Lepidoptera
- Superfamily: Noctuoidea
- Family: Erebidae
- Subfamily: Boletobiinae
- Genus: Hyperstrotia; Hampson, 1910

Synonyms
- Protocryphia Barnes & McDunnough, 1918

= Hyperstrotia =

Genus of moths

Hyperstrotia is a genus of moths of the family Erebidae. The genus was erected by George Hampson in 1910.

== Taxonomy ==
The genus has previously been classified in the subfamily Phytometrinae within Erebidae or in the subfamily Acontiinae of the family Noctuidae.

== Species ==
- Hyperstrotia aetheria Grote, 1879
- Hyperstrotia albida Hampson, 1910
- Hyperstrotia flaviguttata Grote, 1882 – yellow-spotted graylet moth
- Hyperstrotia flavipuncta Leech, 1889
- Hyperstrotia inordinata Walker, [1863]
- Hyperstrotia macroplaga Hampson, 1907
- Hyperstrotia meeki Bethune-Baker, 1906
- Hyperstrotia molybdota Hampson, 1910
- Hyperstrotia nana Hübner, 1818
- Hyperstrotia ochreipuncta Wileman, 1914
- Hyperstrotia oletta Schaus, 1904
- Hyperstrotia pervertens (Barnes & McDunnough, 1918) – dotted graylet moth
- Hyperstrotia secta Grote, 1879 – black-patched graylet moth
- Hyperstrotia semiochrea Hampson, 1898
- Hyperstrotia variata Wileman & West, 1929
- Hyperstrotia villificans Barnes & McDunnough, 1918 – white-lined graylet moth
