= Nychioptera =

Scientific classification
- Domain: Eukaryota
- Kingdom: Animalia
- Phylum: Arthropoda
- Class: Insecta
- Order: Lepidoptera
- Superfamily: Noctuoidea
- Family: Erebidae
- Subfamily: Boletobiinae
- Genus: Nychioptera; Franclemont, 1966

Genus of moths

Nychioptera is a genus of moths of the family Erebidae. The genus was erected by John G. Franclemont in 1966.

== Species ==
- Nychioptera accola Franclemont, 1966
- Nychioptera noctuidalis Dyar, 1907
- Nychioptera opada Franclemont, 1966
