= Acremma albipoda =

Scientific classification
- Domain: Eukaryota
- Kingdom: Animalia
- Phylum: Arthropoda
- Class: Insecta
- Order: Lepidoptera
- Superfamily: Noctuoidea
- Family: Erebidae
- Genus: Acremma
- Species: A. albipoda

Binomial name
- Acremma albipoda Berio, 1959

Species of moth

Acremma albipoda is a moth in the family Erebidae. It was described by Emilio Berio in 1959. It is found in Madagascar.
