= Taraconica =

Scientific classification
- Kingdom: Animalia
- Phylum: Arthropoda
- Clade: Pancrustacea
- Class: Insecta
- Order: Lepidoptera
- Superfamily: Noctuoidea
- Family: Erebidae
- Subfamily: Boletobiinae
- Genus: Taraconica; Berio, 1959

Genus of moths

Taraconica is a genus of moths of the family Erebidae. The genus was erected by Emilio Berio in 1959.

The species of this genus are found in Madagascar.

- Taraconica aurea Viette, 1968
- Taraconica berioi Viette, 1965
- Taraconica betsimisaraka Viette, 1965
- Taraconica bojeri Viette, 1982
- Taraconica humberti Viette, 1965
- Taraconica isekaly Viette, 1982
- Taraconica novogonia (Berio, 1956)
- Taraconica pauliani Viette, 1982
- Taraconica transversa Berio, 1959
- Taraconica vadonae Viette, 1985
