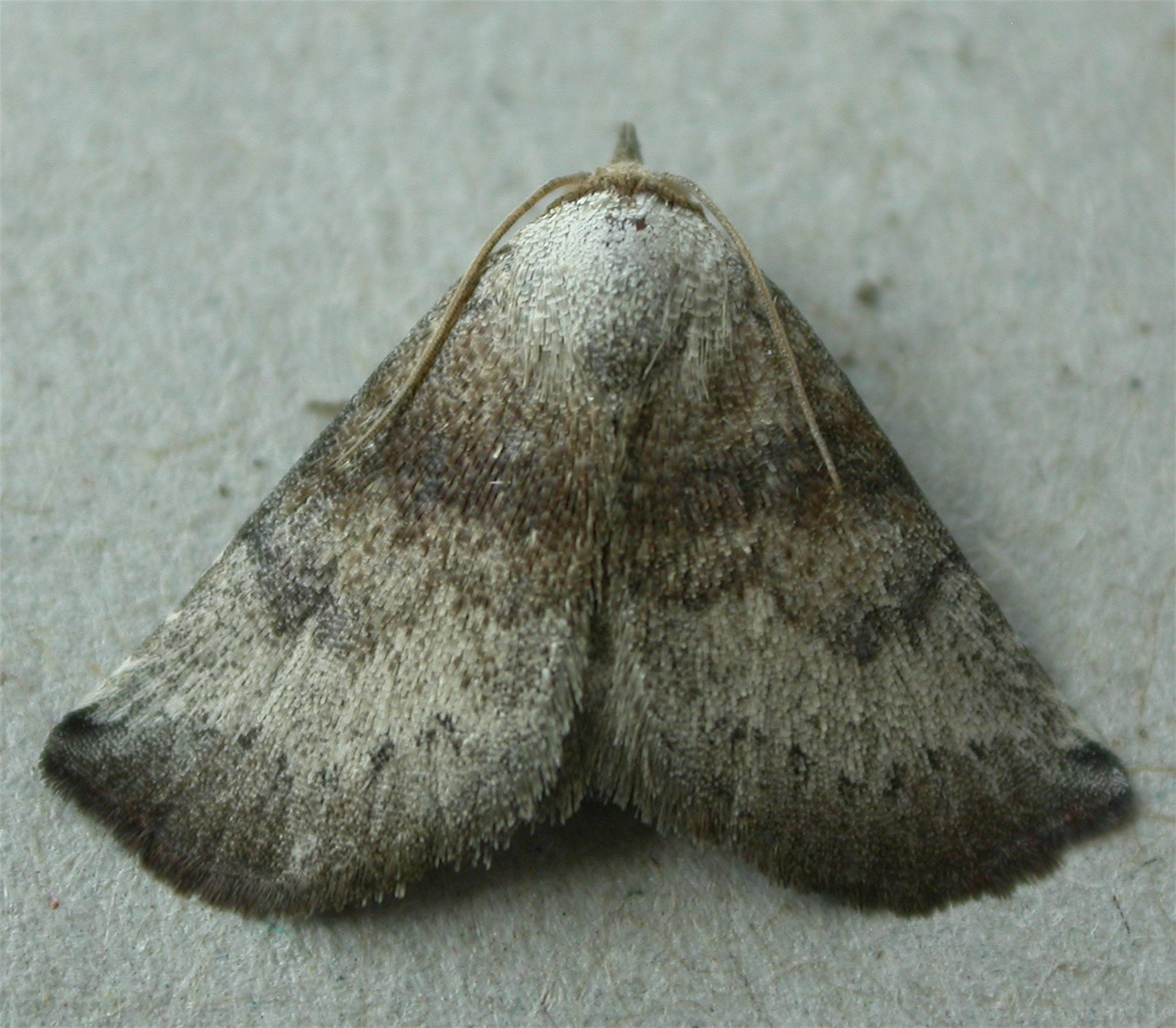
- Mataeomera mesotaenia in Reid, Australian Capital Territory

Scientific classification
- Domain: Eukaryota
- Kingdom: Animalia
- Phylum: Arthropoda
- Class: Insecta
- Order: Lepidoptera
- Superfamily: Noctuoidea
- Family: Erebidae
- Subfamily: Boletobiinae
- Genus: Mataeomera; Butler, 1886

= Mataeomera =

Genus of moths

Mataeomera is a genus of moths of the family Erebidae erected by Arthur Gardiner Butler in 1886. It is considered by some sources to be a synonym of Autoba.

== Taxonomy ==
The genus has previously been classified in the subfamily Eustrotiinae of the family Noctuidae.

== Species ==
- Mataeomera acrosticha Turner, 1920
- Mataeomera anaemacta Turner, 1920
- Mataeomera biangulata Wileman, 1915
- Mataeomera brevipalpis Turner, 1945
- Mataeomera coccophaga Meyrick, 1887
- Mataeomera dubia Butler, 1886
- Mataeomera duporti de Joannis, 1928
- Mataeomera goniaphora Hampson, 1920
- Mataeomera ligata Lucas, 1895
- Mataeomera melanocephala Wileman & West, 1929
- Mataeomera mesotaenia Turner, 1929
- Mataeomera obliquisigna Hampson, 1894
- Mataeomera porphyris Turner, 1920
- Mataeomera punctilinea Turner, 1945
- Mataeomera renalis Hampson, 1918
- Mataeomera semialba Hampson, 1902
- Mataeomera sumbavensis Hampson, 1910
