= Mycterophora =

Scientific classification
- Domain: Eukaryota
- Kingdom: Animalia
- Phylum: Arthropoda
- Class: Insecta
- Order: Lepidoptera
- Superfamily: Noctuoidea
- Family: Erebidae
- Subfamily: Boletobiinae
- Genus: Mycterophora; Hulst, 1896

Genus of moths

Mycterophora is a genus of moths of the family Erebidae. The genus was erected by George Duryea Hulst in 1896.

== Species ==
- Mycterophora geometriformis Hill, 1924.
- Mycterophora inexplicata Walker, 1862.
- Mycterophora longipalpata Hulst, 1896 – long-palped mycterophora moth.
- Mycterophora monticola Hulst, 1896.
- Mycterophora rubricans Barnes & McDunnough, 1918.
