= Marca (moth) =

Scientific classification
- Kingdom: Animalia
- Phylum: Arthropoda
- Clade: Pancrustacea
- Class: Insecta
- Order: Lepidoptera
- Superfamily: Noctuoidea
- Family: Erebidae
- Subfamily: Boletobiinae
- Genus: Marca; Saalmüller, 1891

Genus of moths

Marca is a genus of moths of the family Erebidae. The genus was erected by Max Saalmüller in 1891.

== Species ==
- Marca arcuata (Bethune-Baker, 1911)
- Marca proclinata Saalmüller, 1891

Else: For Marca griseonigralis Viette, 1954, see Polypogon griseonigralis (Viette, 1954) after Hacker, 2021.
For Marca tristalis Viette, 1956, see Bertula tristalis (Viette, 1956) after Hacker, 2021.
For Marca univocalis Viette, 1956, see Bertula univocalis (Viette, 1956) after Hacker, 2021.
