= Proroblemma =

Scientific classification
- Kingdom: Animalia
- Phylum: Arthropoda
- Class: Insecta
- Order: Lepidoptera
- Superfamily: Noctuoidea
- Family: Erebidae
- Subfamily: Boletobiinae
- Genus: Proroblemma; Hampson, 1910

Genus of moths

Proroblemma is a genus of moths of the family Erebidae. The genus was erected by George Hampson in 1910.

== Taxonomy ==
The genus has previously been classified in the subfamily Eublemminae within Erebidae or in the subfamily Acontiinae of the family Noctuidae.

== Species ==
- Proroblemma cupreispila Dyar, 1914
- Proroblemma philogonia Dyar, 1914
- Proroblemma polystriga Hampson, 1910
- Proroblemma porphyrea Dyar, 1914
- Proroblemma rosea Schaus, 1911
- Proroblemma stictopteris Butler, 1881
- Proroblemma testa Barnes & McDunnough, 1913
