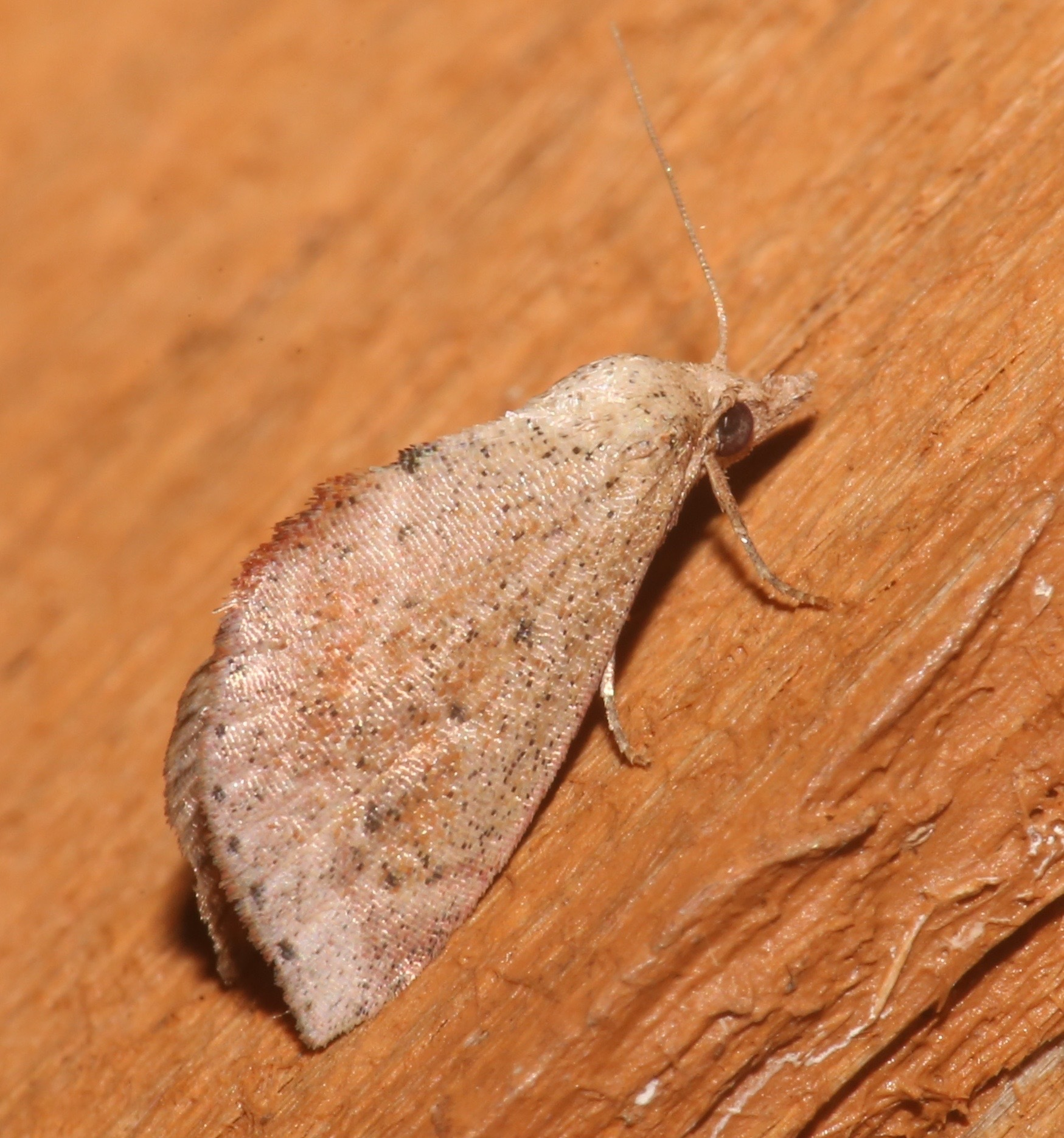

Scientific classification
- Kingdom: Animalia
- Phylum: Arthropoda
- Class: Insecta
- Order: Lepidoptera
- Superfamily: Noctuoidea
- Family: Erebidae
- Genus: Proroblemma
- Species: P. testa

Binomial name
- Proroblemma testa Barnes & McDunnough, 1913

= Proroblemma testa =

Species of moth

Proroblemma testa is a species of moth in the family Erebidae. It was first described by William Barnes and James Halliday McDunnough in 1913 and it is found in North America.

The MONA or Hodges number for Proroblemma testa is 9080.
