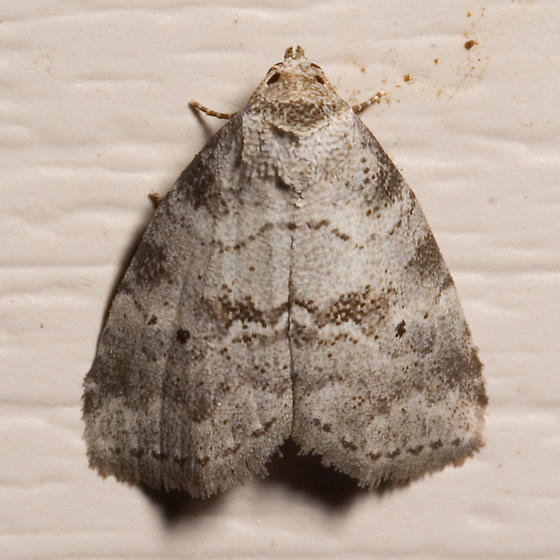

Scientific classification
- Domain: Eukaryota
- Kingdom: Animalia
- Phylum: Arthropoda
- Class: Insecta
- Order: Lepidoptera
- Superfamily: Noctuoidea
- Family: Erebidae
- Genus: Hyperstrotia
- Species: H. pervertens

Binomial name
- Hyperstrotia pervertens (Barnes & McDunnough, 1918)

Synonyms
- Cryphia pervertens Barnes & McDunnough, 1918

= Hyperstrotia pervertens =

Species of moth

Hyperstrotia pervertens, the dotted graylet, is a moth of the family Erebidae. The species was first described by William Barnes and James Halliday McDunnough in 1918. It is found in woodlands and forests of North America from Missouri to Nova Scotia, south to Florida and Texas. It is found in New Brunswick, Nova Scotia, Quebec and Ontario in Canada. In the United States, it has been recorded in Massachusetts, Iowa, New York and South Carolina.

The wingspan is about 16 mm. There is one principal generation.
