= Janseodes =

Scientific classification
- Kingdom: Animalia
- Phylum: Arthropoda
- Clade: Pancrustacea
- Class: Insecta
- Order: Lepidoptera
- Superfamily: Noctuoidea
- Family: Erebidae
- Genus: Janseodes; Viette, 1967
- Species: J. melanospila

Binomial name
- Janseodes melanospila (Guenée, 1852)

Genus of moths

Janseodes is a monotypic genus of moths in the family Erebidae erected by Pierre Viette in 1967. Its only species, Janseodes melanospila, was first described by Achille Guenée in 1852. It is found in India, South Africa and the US state of Florida.

== Taxonomy ==
The genus has previously been classified in the subfamily Phytometrinae within Erebidae or in the subfamily Hadeninae of the family Noctuidae.
