= Hypersophtha =

Scientific classification
- Domain: Eukaryota
- Kingdom: Animalia
- Phylum: Arthropoda
- Class: Insecta
- Order: Lepidoptera
- Superfamily: Noctuoidea
- Family: Noctuidae
- Subfamily: Acontiinae
- Genus: Hypersophtha; Berio, 1954

Genus of moths

Hypersophtha is a genus of moths of the family Erebidae from Madagascar. The genus was erected by Emilio Berio in 1954.

== Species ==
- Hypersophtha falcata Berio, 1954
- Hypersophtha priscata Viette, 1962
