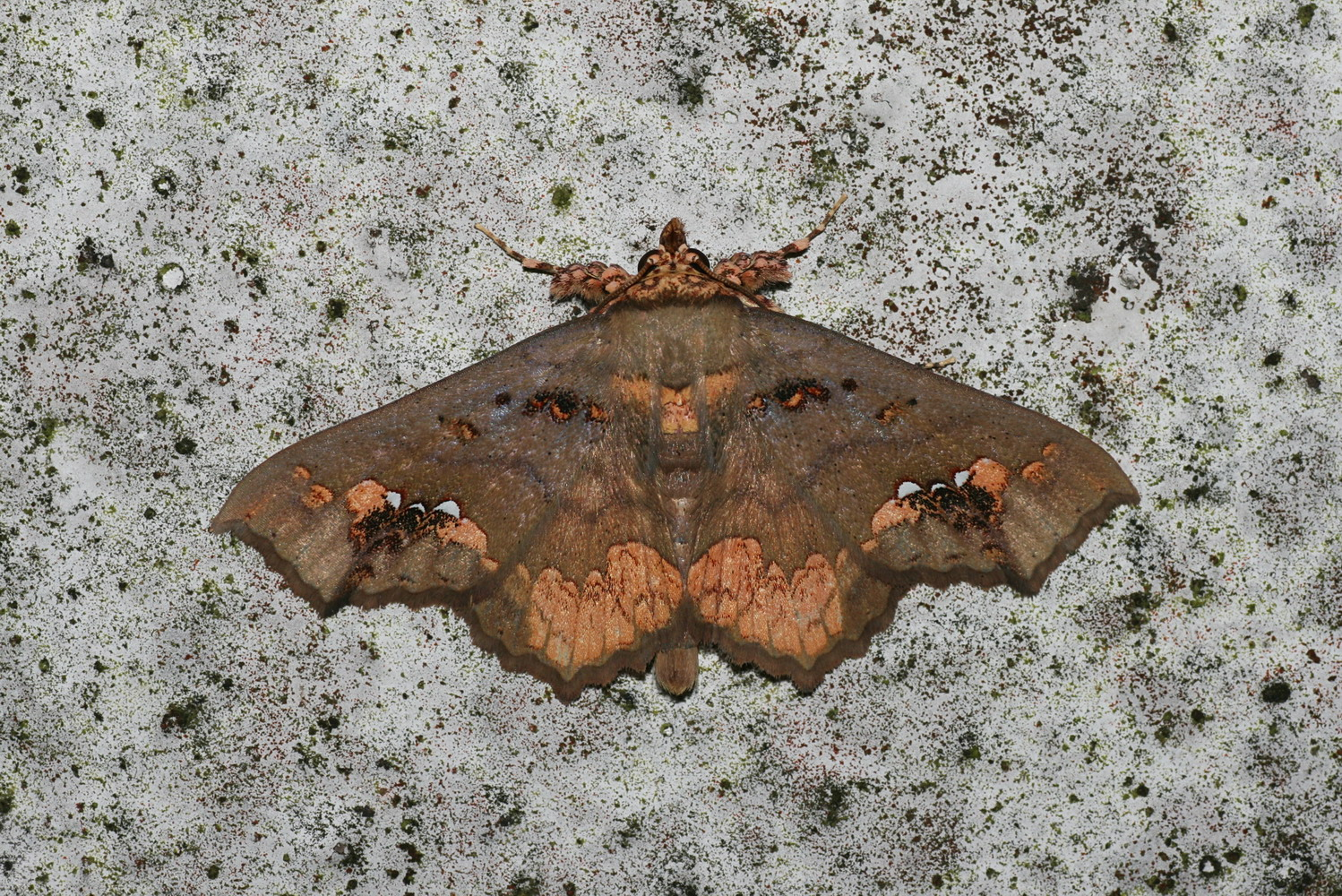
- In Malaysia

Scientific classification
- Kingdom: Animalia
- Phylum: Arthropoda
- Class: Insecta
- Order: Lepidoptera
- Superfamily: Noctuoidea
- Family: Erebidae
- Subfamily: Calpinae
- Genus: Lopharthrum; Hampson, 1895
- Species: L. comprimens

Binomial name
- Lopharthrum comprimens Walker, 1858

Synonyms
- Amphigonia comprimens Walker, 1858

= Lopharthrum =

Genus of moths of the family Erebidae

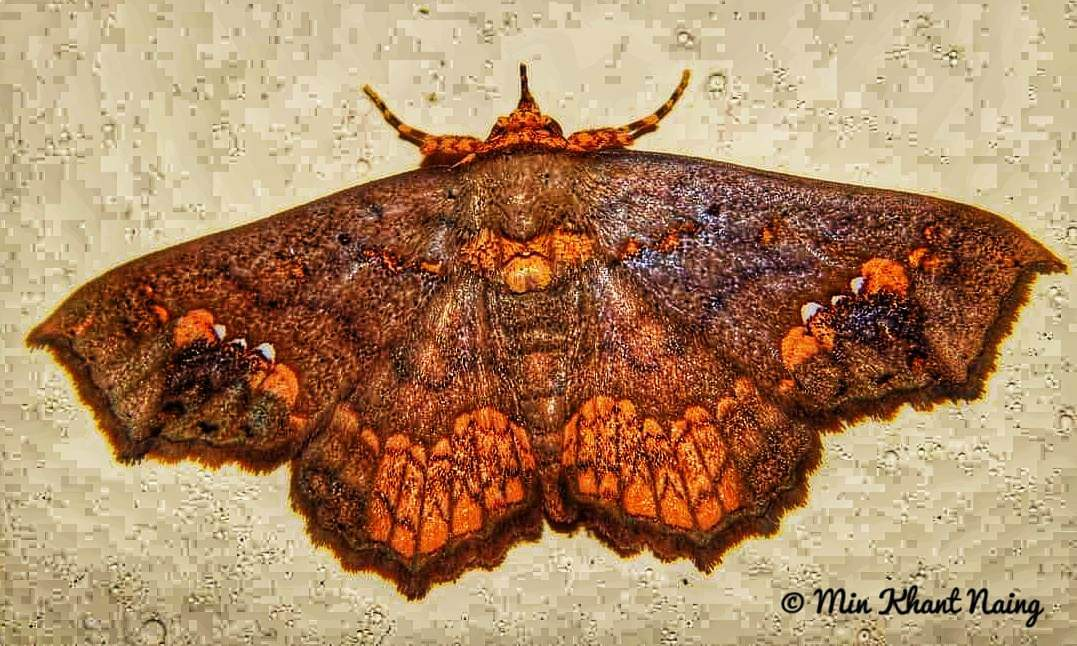
Lopharthrum comprimens

Lopharthrum is a monotypic moth genus of the family Erebidae erected by George Hampson in 1895. Its only species, Lopharthrum comprimens, was first described by Francis Walker in 1858. It is found from the Indian subregion to New Guinea and the Solomons.
