= Enispodes =

Scientific classification
- Kingdom: Animalia
- Phylum: Arthropoda
- Class: Insecta
- Order: Lepidoptera
- Superfamily: Noctuoidea
- Family: Erebidae
- Genus: Enispodes; Warren in Seitz, 1913
- Species: E. purpurea

Binomial name
- Enispodes purpurea (Hampson, 1910)

Synonyms
- Enispa purpurea Hampson, 1910

Genus of moths

Enispodes is a monotypic moth genus of the family Erebidae described by Warren in 1913. Its only species, Enispodes purpurea, was first described by George Hampson in 1910. It is found in Peninsular Malaysia, Singapore and Borneo.

== Taxonomy ==
The genus has previously been classified in the subfamily Acontiinae of the family Noctuidae.
