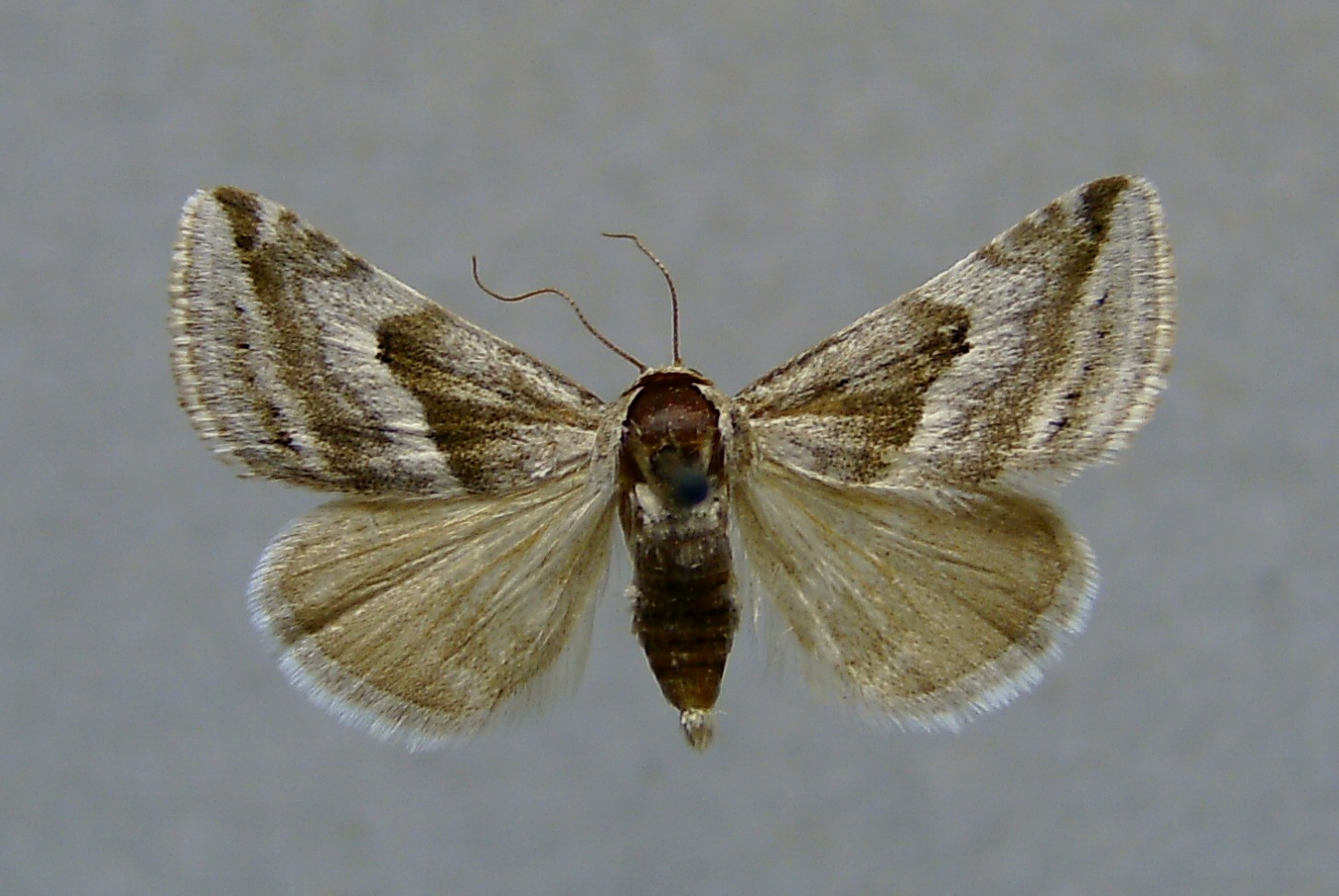
- Eublemma parallela

Scientific classification
- Kingdom: Animalia
- Phylum: Arthropoda
- Clade: Pancrustacea
- Class: Insecta
- Order: Lepidoptera
- Superfamily: Noctuoidea
- Family: Erebidae
- Subfamily: Boletobiinae; Guenée, [1858]

= Boletobiinae =

Subfamily of moths

The Boletobiinae are a subfamily of moths in the family Erebidae, containing about 956 species. The taxon was described by Achille Guenée in 1858.

== Taxonomy ==
Phylogenetic analysis has determined that several subfamilies of the family Erebidae that have been proposed in entomological literature since 2005, including Araeopteroninae, Aventiinae, Boletobiinae, Eublemminae, and Phytometrinae, together form a strongly supported clade as an aggregated subfamily Boletobiinae. The tribe-level groupings of genera within this expanded subfamily Boletobiinae are a topic of continued study.

== Genera ==
- Abacena
- Acremma
- Aglaonice
- Allerastria
- Araeopteron
- Autoba
- Bandelia
- Calymma
- Cecharismena
- Cerynea
- Condate
- Corgatha
- Enispa
- Enispodes
- Euaontia
- Eublemma
- Eublemmoides
- Glympis
- Hemeroplanis
- Hiccoda
- Homocerynea
- Homodes
- Honeyania
- Hormoschista
- Hypenagonia
- Hypersophtha
- Hyperstrotia
- Hyposada
- Isogona
- Janseodes
- Laspeyria
- Lopharthrum
- Loxioda
- Marca
- Mataeomera
- Metachrostis
- Metaemene
- Metalectra
- Micraeschus
- Mursa
- Mycterophora
- Nychioptera
- Odice
- Ommatochila
- Oruza
- Parascotia
- Parolulis
- Phytometra
- Prolophota
- Proroblemma
- Prosoparia
- Pseudcraspedia
- Raparna
- Rhypagla
- Sophta
- Spargaloma
- Tamba
- Taraconica
- Trisateles
- Zurobata
