= List of noctuid genera: M =

The huge moth family Noctuidae contains the following genera:

A B C D E F G H I J K L M N O P Q R S T U V W X Y Z

- Mabilleana
- Macaldenia
- Macapta
- Macdunnoughia
- Macella
- Macellopis
- Machaeropalpus
- Macrhypena
- Macristis
- Macrocarsia
- Macrochilo
- Macrodes
- Macronoctua
- Macroprora
- Madathisanotia
- Madecathymia
- Madegalatha
- Madeuplexia
- Madoce
- Mafana
- Magellana
- Mageochaeta
- Maghadena
- Maguda
- Magulaba
- Magusa
- Maguza
- Maikona
- Makapta
- Malagonia
- Malatrogia
- Maliangia
- Maliattha
- Maltana
- Mamerthes
- Mamestra
- Mammifrontia
- Manbuta
- Mandela
- Manga
- Manoblemma
- Manruta
- Marapana
- Maraschia
- Marasmalus
- Marathyssa
- Marca
- Marcillada
- Marcipa
- Marcipalina
- Marcipopsis
- Mardara
- Maresia
- Mareura
- Margana
- Margasotis
- Margelana
- Margitesia
- Margiza
- Margizoides
- Marilopteryx
- Marimatha
- Marmorinia
- Marojala
- Maronia
- Maronis
- Marsipiophora
- Marthama
- Marzigetta
- Masalia
- Masca
- Maschukia
- Masebia
- Masoga
- Massaga
- Massala
- Massava
- Mastigia
- Mastigophorus
- Mastiphanes
- Mastixis
- Mataeomera
- Matarum
- Mathura
- Matigramma
- Matiloxis
- Matopo
- Maxera
- Maxia
- Maxilua
- Maxula
- Mazacyla
- Mazuca
- Mecistoptera
- Mecodina
- Mecodinops
- Mecodopsis
- Mecynoptera (syn.)
- Mecyra
- Medlerana
- Megacephalomana
- Megachyta
- Megacronycta
- Megaloctena
- Megalodes
- Megalographa
- Megalonycta
- Megaloptera
- Meganephria
- Meganyctycia
- Megarhomba
- Megasema
- Megastopolia
- Meghypena
- Megistoclisma
- Megonychiana
- Meizoglossa
- Mekrania
- Melagramma
- Melaleucantha
- Melamera
- Melanarta
- Melanchra
- Melanchroiopsis
- Melanephia
- Melanomma
- Melanoplusia
- Melapera
- Melapia
- Melaporphyria
- Meliaba
- Melicleptria
- Melionica
- Melipotis
- Mellinia
- Menada
- Menarsia
- Mendozania
- Menecina
- Meneptera
- Menopsimus
- Mentaxya
- Mepantadrea
- Meranda
- Meridyrias
- Meristides
- Meristis
- Merolonche
- Meropis
- Meropleon
- Mervia
- Mesaegle
- Mesapamea
- Mesasteria
- Mesembragrotis
- Mesembreosa
- Mesembreuxoa
- Mesocopsis
- Mesocrapex
- Mesoeuxoa
- Mesogenea
- Mesogona
- Mesoligia
- Mesolomia
- Mesophractias
- Mesoplectra
- Mesoplus
- Mesorhynchaglaea
- Mesoruza
- Mesosciera
- Mesotrosta
- Mestleta
- Metacala
- Metacausta
- Metachrostis
- Metacinia
- Metacullia
- Metaegle
- Metaemene
- Metagarista
- Metagnorisma
- Metahadena
- Metalectra
- Metalepsis
- Metallata
- Metalopha
- Metaphoenia
- Metapioplasta
- Metaplusia
- Metaponpneumata
- Metappana
- Metaprionota
- Metaprosphera
- Metasada
- Metasarca
- Metatacha
- Metaxaglaea
- Metaxanthiella
- Metaxyja
- Metaxyllia
- Metecia
- Meterana
- Methorasa
- Metina
- Metlaouia
- Metopiora
- Metopistis
- Metopoceras
- Metopodicha
- Metoponia
- Metoponrhis
- Metopoplacis
- Metopoplus
- Metoposcopa
- Metopta
- Metria
- Meyrickella
- Micardia
- Michelliana
- Michera
- Micracontia
- Micraeschus
- Micragrotis
- Micramma
- Micrantha
- Micranthops
- Micrapatetis
- Micrathetis
- Micraxylia
- Micreremites
- Micriantha
- Microcoelia
- Microedma
- Microhelia
- Microlita
- Micromania
- Micromonodes
- Microphaea
- Microphisa (syn.)
- Microphta
- Microplexia
- Microraphe
- Microrthosia
- Microselene
- Microsemyra
- Microsyngrapha
- Microxyla
- Mictochroa
- Mila
- Militagrotis
- Milyas
- Mimachrostia
- Mimanuga
- Mimasura
- Mimeugoa
- Mimeusemia
- Mimleucania
- Mimobarathra
- Mimophisma
- Mimoruza
- Minica
- Miniodes
- Miniophyllodes
- Miniphila
- Minofala
- Minucia
- Miodera
- Mionides
- Miracavira
- Miracopa
- Miropalpa
- Misa
- Miselia
- Mithila
- Mitothemma
- Mitrophrys
- Mixomelia
- Mnesipyrga
- Mniopamea
- Mniotype
- Mocis
- Mocrendes
- Modunga
- Moepa
- Molopa
- Molvena
- Molybdonycta
- Molynda
- Momophana
- Monima
- Monobotodes
- Monochroides
- Monocondica
- Monocymia
- Monodes
- Monogona
- Monoptya
- Monosca
- Monostola
- Monoxylena
- Monticollia
- Mopothila
- Mormecia
- Mormo
- Mormonia
- Mormoscopa
- Morphopoliana
- Morrisonia
- Mosara
- Mosopia
- Motama
- Motina
- Mouralia
- Moureia
- Mudaria
- Mulelocha
- Multsotis
- Murgisa
- Mursa
- Musothyma
- Musurgina
- Myalila
- Myana
- Mycterophora
- Mycteroplus
- Mydrodoxa
- Myrtale
- Mystomemia
- Mystrocephala
- Mythimna
- Mythymima
- Myxinia
