= Melanomma =

Melanomma may refer to:

- Melanomma (fungus), a genus of fungi in the family Melanommataceae
- Melanomma (moth), a genus of moths in the family Erebidae

== See also ==
- Melanoma
