= Micrantha =

Micrantha may refer to:

- Micrantha (citrus), a wild citrus
- Micrantha (crucifer), a genus of plants in the family Brassicaceae
- Micrantha (moth), a genus of moths

== See also ==
- Micranthes, a genus of plants in the saxifrage family
