= Manruta =

Scientific classification
- Domain: Eukaryota
- Kingdom: Animalia
- Phylum: Arthropoda
- Class: Insecta
- Order: Lepidoptera
- Superfamily: Noctuoidea
- Family: Noctuidae
- Subfamily: Noctuinae
- Genus: Manruta; Smith, 1903

Genus of moths

Manruta is a genus of moths of the family Noctuidae. It was first described by Smith in 1903 and is part of the Manruta Family, with no subspecies.

== Species ==
- Manruta elingua Smith, 1903
