= Medlerana =

Scientific classification
- Domain: Eukaryota
- Kingdom: Animalia
- Phylum: Arthropoda
- Class: Insecta
- Order: Lepidoptera
- Superfamily: Noctuoidea
- Family: Noctuidae
- Subfamily: Noctuinae
- Genus: Medlerana; Laporte, 1973

Genus of moths

Medlerana is a genus of moths of the family Noctuidae.

== Species ==
- Medlerana bukobaenensis Laporte, 1979 (from Tanzania)
- Medlerana nigeriensis Laporte, 1979 (from Nigeria)
