= Mastixis anthores =

Scientific classification
- Domain: Eukaryota
- Kingdom: Animalia
- Phylum: Arthropoda
- Class: Insecta
- Order: Lepidoptera
- Superfamily: Noctuoidea
- Family: Erebidae
- Genus: Mastixis
- Species: M. anthores

Binomial name
- Mastixis anthores (H. Druce, 1891)

Synonyms
- Mastigophorus anthores H. Druce, 1891

Species of moth

Mastixis anthores is a species of moth in the family Erebidae. The scientific name of this species was first published 1891 by Herbert Druce. It is found in Panama.

The forewings are pale brown, slightly irrorated (sprinkled) with grey scales, crossed between the base and the end of the cell from the costal to the inner margin by two waved indistinct brown lines. There is a large oval reddish-brown spot at the end of the cell, beyond which a distinct brown line crosses the wing. There is a dark brown spot close to the apex and the marginal line is black. The hindwings are dull brown, crossed from the costal to the inner margin below the middle by a faint brown line. The marginal line is black.
