= Mesembreuxoa =

Scientific classification
- Domain: Eukaryota
- Kingdom: Animalia
- Phylum: Arthropoda
- Class: Insecta
- Order: Lepidoptera
- Superfamily: Noctuoidea
- Family: Noctuidae
- Subfamily: Noctuinae
- Genus: Mesembreuxoa

Genus of moths

Mesembreuxoa is a genus of moths of the family Noctuidae.
