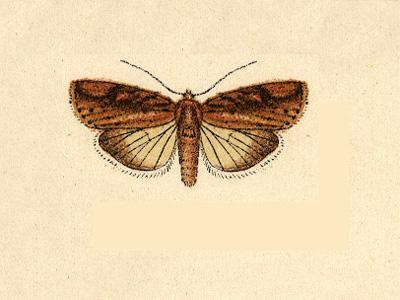

Scientific classification
- Kingdom: Animalia
- Phylum: Arthropoda
- Class: Insecta
- Order: Lepidoptera
- Superfamily: Noctuoidea
- Family: Noctuidae
- Genus: Macapta
- Species: M. albivitta

Binomial name
- Macapta albivitta Hampson, 1910

Synonyms
- Macapta albivittata

= Macapta albivitta =

Species of moth

Macapta albivitta is a moth of the family Noctuidae. It is found on Jamaica.
