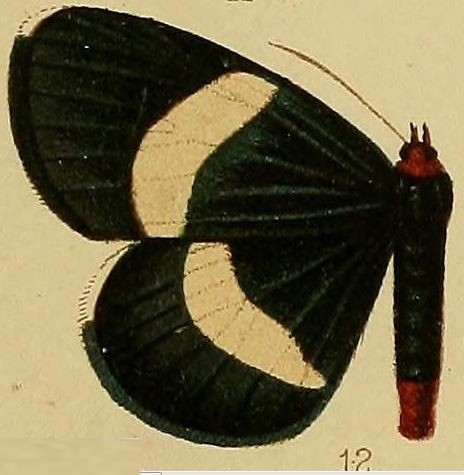

Scientific classification
- Kingdom: Animalia
- Phylum: Arthropoda
- Class: Insecta
- Order: Lepidoptera
- Superfamily: Noctuoidea
- Family: Noctuidae
- Genus: Massaga
- Species: M. tenuifascia

Binomial name
- Massaga tenuifascia (Hampson, 1910)

Synonyms
- Massagidia tenuifascia Hampson, 1910

= Massaga tenuifascia =

Species of moth

Massaga tenuifascia is a moth of the family Noctuidae. It is found in the Democratic Republic of Congo and in Zambia.
