= Miniophyllodes aurora =

Scientific classification
- Domain: Eukaryota
- Kingdom: Animalia
- Phylum: Arthropoda
- Class: Insecta
- Order: Lepidoptera
- Superfamily: Noctuoidea
- Family: Noctuidae (?)
- Genus: Miniophyllodes
- Species: M. aurora

Binomial name
- Miniophyllodes aurora de Joannis, 1912

Synonyms
- Miniodes catalai Viette, 1950

Species of moth

Miniophyllodes aurora is a species of moth of the family Erebidae. It is found in northern Madagascar.

This species has a wingspan of 72 mm.
