= Misa costistrigata =

Scientific classification
- Domain: Eukaryota
- Kingdom: Animalia
- Phylum: Arthropoda
- Class: Insecta
- Order: Lepidoptera
- Superfamily: Noctuoidea
- Family: Noctuidae
- Genus: Misa
- Species: M. costistrigata

Binomial name
- Misa costistrigata (Bethune-Baker, 1927)

Synonyms
- Tuerta costistrigata Bethune-Baker, 1927; Schausia costistrigata Bethune-Baker, 1927

Species of moth

Misa costistrigata is a moth in the family Noctuidae. It was described by George Thomas Bethune-Baker in 1927. It is found in Cameroon.

The wingspan is about 48 mm. Both wings are black with broad white median areas. The forewings have three indistinct stripes of scattered blue scales in the basal area, followed by a broad oblique white stripe from the costa to the inner margin. The costa has a subcostal stripe of differently placed scales from the inner edge of the white stripe almost into the subapical area. This stripe is white in the white area, but grey in the black area. The neuration beyond the white area is finely marked out with bluish scales. The basal black area of the hindwings is restricted and followed by a very broad white area. The outer margin is very broadly deep black.
