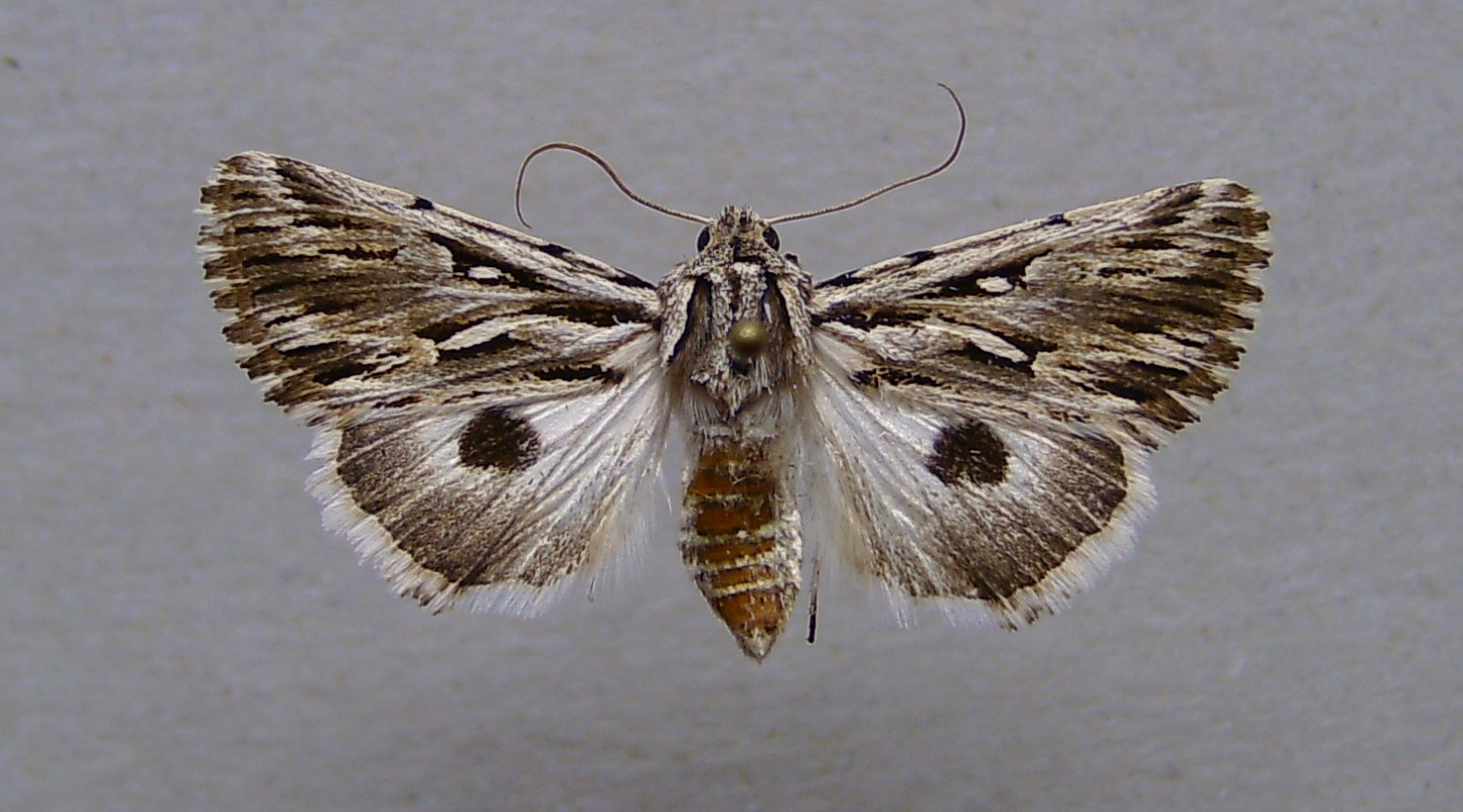

Scientific classification
- Domain: Eukaryota
- Kingdom: Animalia
- Phylum: Arthropoda
- Class: Insecta
- Order: Lepidoptera
- Superfamily: Noctuoidea
- Family: Erebidae
- Subfamily: Calpinae
- Genus: Marsipiophora
- Species: M. christophi

Binomial name
- Marsipiophora christophi (Erschoff, 1864)

Synonyms
- Calophasia christophi Erschoff, 1874

= Marsipiophora christophi =

Species of moth

Marsipiophora christophi is a moth of the family Noctuidae first described by Nikolay Grigoryevich Erschoff in 1864. It is found in Turkmenistan, Kazakhstan and Iran.

The wingspan is 48–56 mm.
