= Micreremites rasalis =

Scientific classification
- Kingdom: Animalia
- Phylum: Arthropoda
- Clade: Pancrustacea
- Class: Insecta
- Order: Lepidoptera
- Superfamily: Noctuoidea
- Family: Erebidae
- Genus: Micreremites
- Species: M. rasalis

Binomial name
- Micreremites rasalis Warren, 1891

Synonyms
- Zanclopalpus rasalis (Warren, 1891)

Species of moth

Micreremites rasalis is a moth of the family Noctuidae first described by Warren in 1891. It is found in Sri Lanka.
