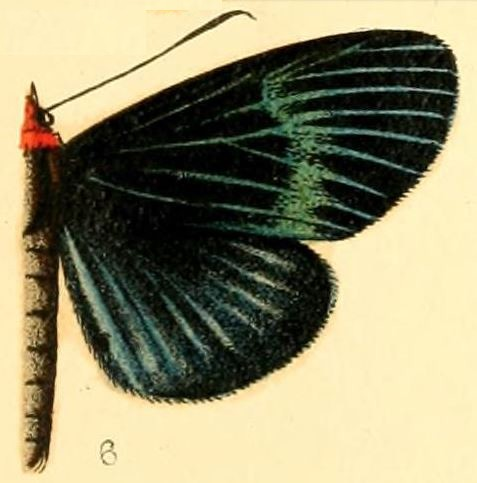

Scientific classification
- Kingdom: Animalia
- Phylum: Arthropoda
- Class: Insecta
- Order: Lepidoptera
- Superfamily: Noctuoidea
- Family: Noctuidae
- Genus: Massaga
- Species: M. monteirona

Binomial name
- Massaga monteirona Butler, 1874

Synonyms
- Eusemia metallica Mabille, 1878

= Massaga monteirona =

Species of moth

Massaga monteirona is a moth of the family Noctuidae. It is found in Angola, Cameroon, the Democratic Republic of Congo and Ivory Coast.
