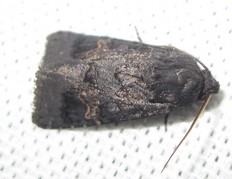

Scientific classification
- Domain: Eukaryota
- Kingdom: Animalia
- Phylum: Arthropoda
- Class: Insecta
- Order: Lepidoptera
- Superfamily: Noctuoidea
- Family: Erebidae
- Genus: Melanephia
- Species: M. brunneiventris

Binomial name
- Melanephia brunneiventris Berio, 1956

= Melanephia brunneiventris =

Species of moth

Melanephia brunneiventris is a species of moth of the family Erebidae. It is found in central Madagascar.
