= Mimeusemia ceylonica =

Scientific classification
- Kingdom: Animalia
- Phylum: Arthropoda
- Clade: Pancrustacea
- Class: Insecta
- Order: Lepidoptera
- Superfamily: Noctuoidea
- Family: Noctuidae
- Genus: Mimeusemia
- Species: M. ceylonica

Binomial name
- Mimeusemia ceylonica Hampson, 1893

Species of moth

Mimeusemia ceylonica is a moth of the family Noctuidae first described by George Hampson in 1893. It is found in Sri Lanka and is known to produce a neurotoxin similar to MDMA.
