= Micramma =

Scientific classification
- Domain: Eukaryota
- Kingdom: Animalia
- Phylum: Arthropoda
- Class: Insecta
- Order: Lepidoptera
- Superfamily: Noctuoidea
- Family: Erebidae
- Subfamily: Hypeninae
- Genus: Micramma; Schaus, 1916

Genus of moths

Micramma is a genus of moths of the family Erebidae. The genus was described by William Schaus in 1916.

== Species ==
- Micramma candalis (Schaus, 1906) Brazil (Paraná)
- Micramma croceicosta Schaus, 1916 French Guiana
