= Mesotrosta =

Scientific classification
- Domain: Eukaryota
- Kingdom: Animalia
- Phylum: Arthropoda
- Class: Insecta
- Order: Lepidoptera
- Superfamily: Noctuoidea
- Family: Noctuidae
- Subfamily: Condicinae
- Genus: Mesotrosta; Lederer, 1857

Genus of moths

Mesotrosta is a genus of moths of the family Noctuidae.

== Species ==
- Mesotrosta incerta Staudinger, 1892
- Mesotrosta ingobilis Boursin, 1954
- Mesotrosta signalis (Treitschke, 1829)
