= Melapera =

Scientific classification
- Kingdom: Animalia
- Phylum: Arthropoda
- Class: Insecta
- Order: Lepidoptera
- Superfamily: Noctuoidea
- Family: Erebidae
- Subfamily: Calpinae
- Genus: Melapera; Hampson, 1908

Genus of moths

Melapera is a genus of moths of the family Erebidae. The genus was erected by George Hampson in 1908. Both species are known from Madagascar.

== Species ==
- Melapera rhodophora (Mabille, 1879)
- Melapera roastis Hampson, 1908
