= Micracontia =

Scientific classification
- Kingdom: Animalia
- Phylum: Arthropoda
- Class: Insecta
- Order: Lepidoptera
- Superfamily: Noctuoidea
- Family: Noctuidae
- Subfamily: Acontiinae
- Genus: Micracontia; Hampson, 1895
- Species: M. batisella

Binomial name
- Micracontia batisella Hampson, 1895

Genus of moths

Micracontia is a monotypic moth genus of the family Noctuidae. Its only species, Micracontia batisella, is found in Sri Lanka. Both the genus and species were first described by George Hampson in 1895.
