= Madathisanotia =

Scientific classification
- Kingdom: Animalia
- Phylum: Arthropoda
- Class: Insecta
- Order: Lepidoptera
- Superfamily: Noctuoidea
- Family: Noctuidae
- Subfamily: Amphipyrinae
- Genus: Madathisanotia; Viette, 1970
- Species: M. madagascariensis

Binomial name
- Madathisanotia madagascariensis (Rothschild, 1924)

Synonyms
- Eudryas madagascariensis Rothschild, 1924

Genus of moths

Madathisanotia is a monotypic moth genus of the family Noctuidae erected by Pierre Viette in 1970. Its only species, Madathisanotia madagascariensis, was first described by Walter Rothschild in 1924. It is known from northern Madagascar.
