= Meizoglossa =

Scientific classification
- Domain: Eukaryota
- Kingdom: Animalia
- Phylum: Arthropoda
- Class: Insecta
- Order: Lepidoptera
- Superfamily: Noctuoidea
- Family: Noctuidae
- Subfamily: Acontiinae
- Genus: Meizoglossa; Hulstaert, 1924
- Species: M. bipunctata

Binomial name
- Meizoglossa bipunctata Hulstaert, 1924

Genus of moths

Meizoglossa is a monotypic moth genus of the family Noctuidae. Its only species, Meizoglossa bipunctata, was described from "Olilit, Tenimber", which seems to be an old name for a locality in the Tanimbar Islands of Indonesia. Both the genus and species were first described by Gustaaf Hulstaert in 1924.
