= Metaegle =

Scientific classification
- Kingdom: Animalia
- Phylum: Arthropoda
- Class: Insecta
- Order: Lepidoptera
- Superfamily: Noctuoidea
- Family: Noctuidae
- Genus: Metaegle; Hampson, 1908

Genus of moths

Metaegle is a genus of moths of the family Noctuidae.

== Species ==
- Metaegle pallida (Staudinger, 1892)
