= Melaleucantha =

Scientific classification
- Domain: Eukaryota
- Kingdom: Animalia
- Phylum: Arthropoda
- Class: Insecta
- Order: Lepidoptera
- Superfamily: Noctuoidea
- Family: Noctuidae
- Subfamily: Acontiinae
- Genus: Melaleucantha; Draudt, 1950
- Species: M. albibasis

Binomial name
- Melaleucantha albibasis Draudt, 1950

Genus of moths

Melaleucantha is a monotypic moth genus of the family Noctuidae. Its only species, Melaleucantha albibasis, is found in China where it was first described from Mount Mian. Both the genus and species were first described by Max Wilhelm Karl Draudt in 1950.
