= Mastigia =

Scientific classification
- Domain: Eukaryota
- Kingdom: Animalia
- Phylum: Arthropoda
- Class: Insecta
- Order: Lepidoptera
- Superfamily: Noctuoidea
- Family: Erebidae
- Subfamily: Herminiinae
- Genus: Mastigia; Schaus, 1916
- Species: M. epitusalis

Binomial name
- Mastigia epitusalis (Walker, [1859])

Synonyms
- Mastygophora epitusalis Walker, [1859]

Genus of moths

Mastigia is a monotypic moth genus of the family Erebidae described by Schaus in 1916. Its only species, Mastigia epitusalis, was first described by Francis Walker in 1859. It is known from Venezuela.
