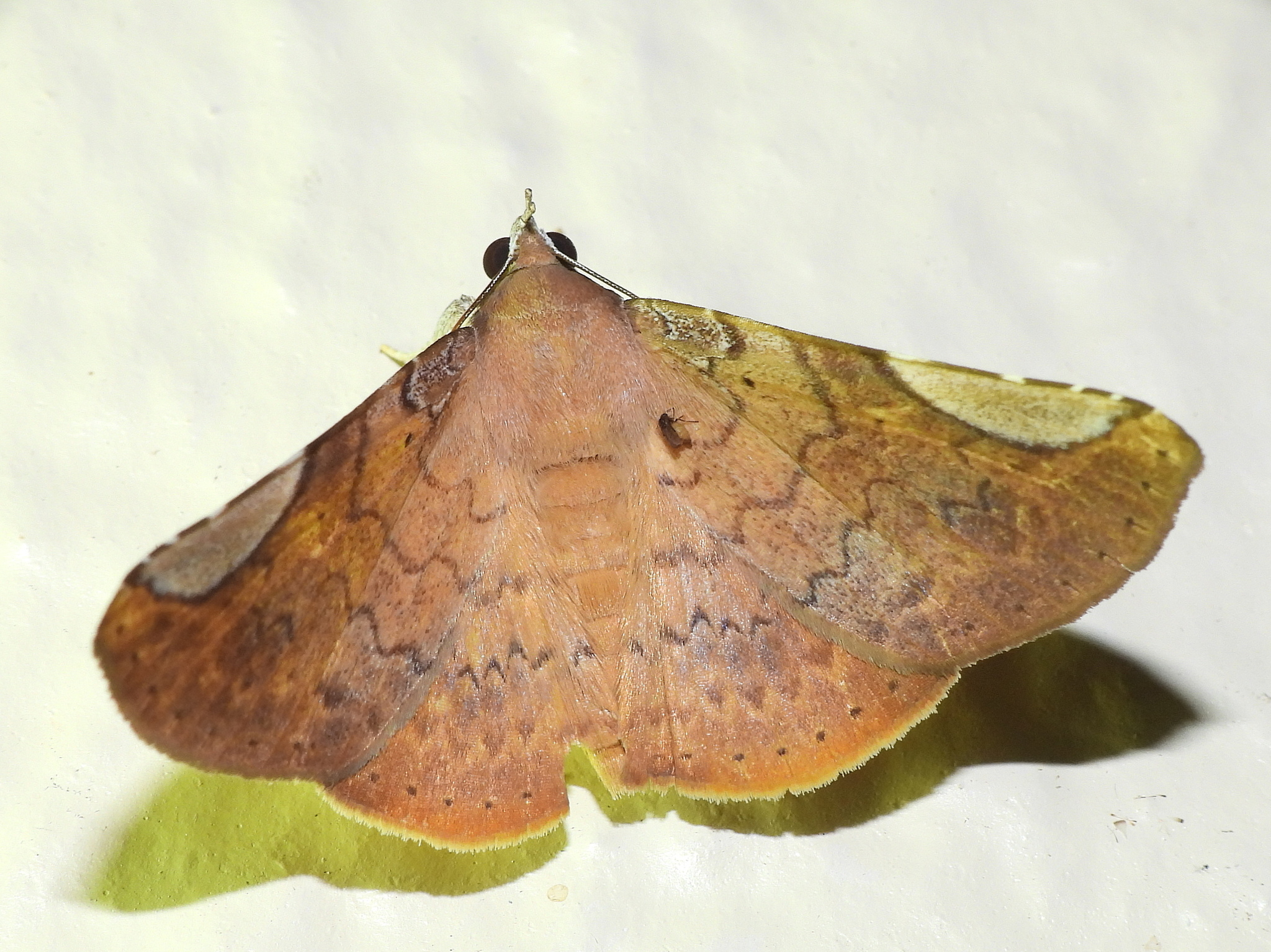
- Mazacyla relata

Scientific classification
- Kingdom: Animalia
- Phylum: Arthropoda
- Clade: Pancrustacea
- Class: Insecta
- Order: Lepidoptera
- Superfamily: Noctuoidea
- Family: Erebidae
- Subfamily: Calpinae
- Genus: Mazacyla; Walker, 1865

= Mazacyla =

Genus of moths

Mazacyla is a genus of moths in the family Erebidae. The genus was erected by Francis Walker in 1865.

The Global Lepidoptera Names Index considers this name to be a synonym of the genus Mecodinops Hampson, 1926.

== Species ==
- Mazacyla fusifera Walker, 1865 - Brazil (Rio de Janeiro)
- Mazacyla lilacina (Felder & Rogenhofer, 1874) - Brazil (Amazonas)
- Mazacyla relata (Walker, 1858) - Suriname, Brazil (Amazonas)
- Mazacyla subpicta Schaus, 1911 - cCosta Rica
