= Mastixis =

Scientific classification
- Domain: Eukaryota
- Kingdom: Animalia
- Phylum: Arthropoda
- Class: Insecta
- Order: Lepidoptera
- Superfamily: Noctuoidea
- Family: Erebidae
- Subfamily: Herminiinae
- Genus: Mastixis; Schaus, 1913

Genus of insects

Mastixis is a genus of moths of the family Noctuidae described by William Schaus in 1913.

== Species ==
- Mastixis aeneas Schaus, 1916
- Mastixis albilimbata Dognin, 1914
- Mastixis angitia (Druce, 1891)
- Mastixis anthores (Druce, 1891)
- Mastixis aonia (Druce, 1891)
- Mastixis apsinthes (Druce, 1891)
- Mastixis aspisalis (Walker, 1859)
- Mastixis castronalis Schaus, 1916
- Mastixis chloe Schaus, 1913
- Mastixis comptulalis (Guenee, 1854)
- Mastixis dukinfieldi Schaus, 1916
- Mastixis galealis (Felder & Rogenhofer, 1874)
- Mastixis hippocoon Schaus, 1916
- Mastixis hyades Dognin, 1914
- Mastixis infuscata Dognin, 1914
- Mastixis languida Dognin, 1914
- Mastixis lineata (Schaus, 1906)
- Mastixis lysaniax (Druce, 1891)
- Mastixis macedo (Druce, 1891)
- Mastixis plumalis (Felder & Rogenhofer, 1874)
- Mastixis rilmela Dyar, 1927
- Mastixis stalemusalis (Walker, 1859)
- Mastixis tessellata (Druce, 1891)
- Mastixis turrialbensis Schaus, 1913
