= Metasada =

Scientific classification
- Kingdom: Animalia
- Phylum: Arthropoda
- Class: Insecta
- Order: Lepidoptera
- Superfamily: Noctuoidea
- Family: Noctuidae
- Subfamily: Acontiinae
- Genus: Metasada; Hampson, 1910

Genus of moths

Metasada is a genus of moths of the family Noctuidae erected by George Hampson in 1910.

== Species ==
- Metasada acontianalis Rothschild, 1915
- Metasada polycesta Turner, 1902
