= Marojala (moth) =

Scientific classification
- Kingdom: Animalia
- Phylum: Arthropoda
- Class: Insecta
- Order: Lepidoptera
- Superfamily: Noctuoidea
- Family: Erebidae
- Subfamily: Calpinae
- Genus: Marojala; Viette, 1966

Synonyms
- Melanophthalma Hampson, 1926

Genus of moths

Marojala is a genus of moths of the family Erebidae. The genus was described by Viette in 1966. All the species are found on Madagascar.

== Species ==
- Marojala anophtalma (Viette, 1966)
- Marojala butleri (Viette, 1966)
- Marojala signata (Butler, 1880)
