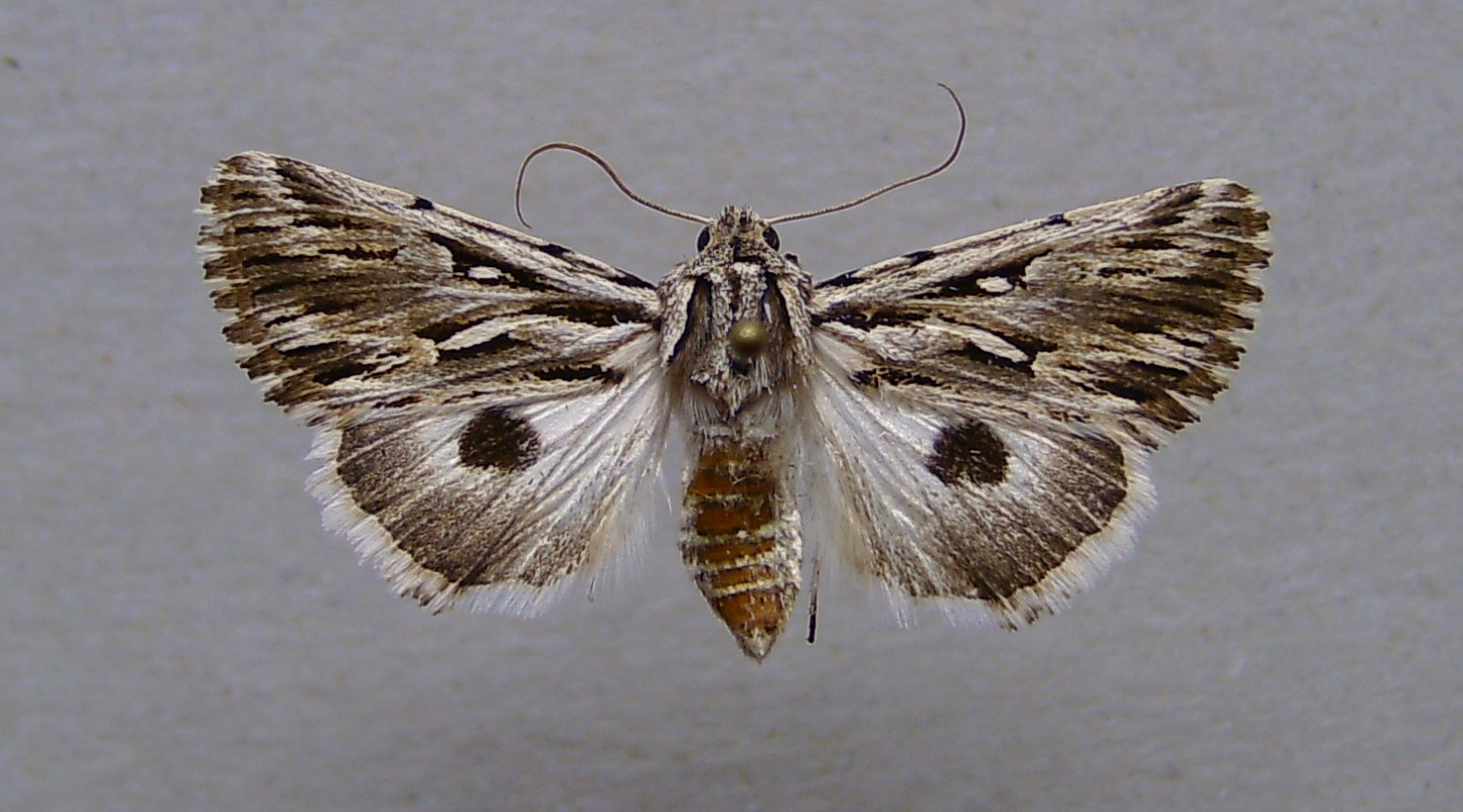
- Marsipiophora christophi

Scientific classification
- Domain: Eukaryota
- Kingdom: Animalia
- Phylum: Arthropoda
- Class: Insecta
- Order: Lepidoptera
- Superfamily: Noctuoidea
- Family: Erebidae
- Subfamily: Calpinae
- Genus: Marsipiophora; John, 1909

= Marsipiophora =

Genus of moths

Marsipiophora is a genus of moths of the family Erebidae. The genus was erected by Oscar John in 1909.

== Species ==
- Marsipiophora calopepla Varga & Ronkay, 1991
- Marsipiophora christophi (Erschoff, 1874)
