= Mopothila =

Scientific classification
- Kingdom: Animalia
- Phylum: Arthropoda
- Class: Insecta
- Order: Lepidoptera
- Superfamily: Noctuoidea
- Family: Erebidae
- Subfamily: Calpinae
- Genus: Mopothila; Nye, 1975
- Species: M. ardalus

Binomial name
- Mopothila ardalus (H. Druce, 1891)

Synonyms
- Lithopoma Schaus, 1916

Genus of moths

Mopothila is a monotypic moth genus of the family Erebidae, described by Nye in 1975. Its only species, Mopothila ardalus, was first described by Herbert Druce in 1891. It is found in Panama.
