= Madegalatha =

Scientific classification
- Kingdom: Animalia
- Phylum: Arthropoda
- Class: Insecta
- Order: Lepidoptera
- Superfamily: Noctuoidea
- Family: Noctuidae
- Genus: Madegalatha; Viette, 1965

Genus of moths

Madegalatha is a genus of moths of the family Noctuidae. The genus was described by Viette in 1965.

== Species ==
- Madegalatha malagassica (Hampson, 1909)
- Madegalatha occidentis (Viette, 1968)
