= Monochroides =

Scientific classification
- Domain: Eukaryota
- Kingdom: Animalia
- Phylum: Arthropoda
- Class: Insecta
- Order: Lepidoptera
- Superfamily: Noctuoidea
- Family: Erebidae
- Subfamily: Herminiinae
- Genus: Monochroides; Kaye & Lamont, 1927
- Species: M. olivescens

Binomial name
- Monochroides olivescens (Warren, 1889)

Synonyms
- Bleptina olivescens Warren, 1889

Genus of moths

Monochroides is a monotypic moth genus of the family Erebidae erected by William James Kaye and Norman Lamont in 1927. Its only species, Monochroides olivescens, was first described by Warren in 1889. It is found in the Brazilian state of Amazonas.
