= Metasarca =

Scientific classification
- Kingdom: Animalia
- Phylum: Arthropoda
- Class: Insecta
- Order: Lepidoptera
- Superfamily: Noctuoidea
- Family: Erebidae
- Subfamily: Calpinae
- Genus: Metasarca; Dyar, 1925

Genus of moths

Metasarca is a genus of moths of the family Erebidae. The genus was erected by Harrison Gray Dyar Jr. in 1925. Both species are found in Mexico.

== Species ==
- Metasarca euphancra Dyar, 1925
- Metasarca euphanera Hampson, 1926
