= Mafana =

Scientific classification
- Kingdom: Animalia
- Phylum: Arthropoda
- Class: Insecta
- Order: Lepidoptera
- Superfamily: Noctuoidea
- Family: Erebidae
- Subfamily: Calpinae
- Genus: Mafana; Viette, 1979

Genus of moths

Mafana is a genus of moths of the family Erebidae. The genus was described by Viette in 1979.

== Species ==
- Mafana lajonquierei Viette, 1979 Madagascar
- Mafana lemairei Viette, 1979 Madagascar
