= Maxia =

Scientific classification
- Kingdom: Animalia
- Phylum: Arthropoda
- Clade: Pancrustacea
- Class: Insecta
- Order: Lepidoptera
- Superfamily: Noctuoidea
- Family: Erebidae
- Subfamily: Hypeninae
- Genus: Maxia; Heyden in Saalmüller, 1891
- Species: M. decora

Binomial name
- Maxia decora Saalmüller, 1891

Genus of moths

Maxia is a monotypic moth genus of the family Erebidae erected by Lucas von Heyden in 1891. Its only species, Maxia decora, was first described by Max Saalmüller in 1891. The species is found on Madagascar.
