= Marcipopsis =

Scientific classification
- Domain: Eukaryota
- Kingdom: Animalia
- Phylum: Arthropoda
- Class: Insecta
- Order: Lepidoptera
- Superfamily: Noctuoidea
- Family: Erebidae
- Subfamily: Calpinae
- Genus: Marcipopsis; Berio, 1966

Genus of moths

Marcipopsis is a genus of moths of the family Erebidae. The genus was erected by Emilio Berio in 1966. All the species are found on Madagascar.

== Species ==
- Marcipopsis achyropa (Viette, 1958)
- Marcipopsis alumna (Saalmüller, 1891)
- Marcipopsis asinina (Saalmüller, 1891)
- Marcipopsis aureolimbata Berio, 1966
- Marcipopsis bicolor Viette, 1972
- Marcipopsis bullifera (Viette, 1958)
- Marcipopsis concinna Berio, 1966
- Marcipopsis liberta (Viette, 1958)
- Marcipopsis limosa (Saalmüller, 1891)
- Marcipopsis lucina Viette, 1972
- Marcipopsis multipuncta Viette, 1972
- Marcipopsis niobe Viette, 1972
- Marcipopsis pallidula (Saalmüller, 1891)
- Marcipopsis perineti Viette, 1972
- Marcipopsis proxima Berio, 1966
- Marcipopsis uniformis Berio, 1966
