= Mesembreosa =

Scientific classification
- Domain: Eukaryota
- Kingdom: Animalia
- Phylum: Arthropoda
- Class: Insecta
- Order: Lepidoptera
- Superfamily: Noctuoidea
- Family: Noctuidae
- Subfamily: Acontiinae
- Genus: Mesembreosa; Hulstaert, 1924
- Species: M. albatra

Binomial name
- Mesembreosa albatra Hulstaert, 1924

Genus of moths

Mesembreosa is a monotypic moth genus of the family Noctuidae. Its only species, Mesembreosa albatra, was described from "Tenimber", which appears to be an old spelling of the Tanimbar Islands in Indonesia. Both the genus and species were first described by Gustaaf Hulstaert in 1924.
