= Margitesia =

Scientific classification
- Kingdom: Animalia
- Phylum: Arthropoda
- Class: Insecta
- Order: Lepidoptera
- Superfamily: Noctuoidea
- Family: Erebidae
- Subfamily: Herminiinae
- Genus: Margitesia; Strand, 1935
- Species: M. bugaba

Binomial name
- Margitesia bugaba (H. Druce, 1891)

Synonyms
- Generic: Margites H. Druce, 1891; Specific: Margites bugaba H. Druce, 1891

Genus of moths

Margitesia is a monotypic moth genus of the family Erebidae described by Strand in 1935. Its only species, Margitesia bugaba, was first described by Herbert Druce in 1891. It is found in Panama.
