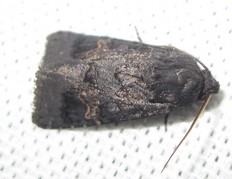
- Melanephia brunneiventris

Scientific classification
- Domain: Eukaryota
- Kingdom: Animalia
- Phylum: Arthropoda
- Class: Insecta
- Order: Lepidoptera
- Superfamily: Noctuoidea
- Family: Erebidae
- Subfamily: Calpinae
- Genus: Melanephia; Le Cerf, 1922

Synonyms
- Melanephia Hampson, 1926

= Melanephia =

Genus of moths

Melanephia is a genus of moths of the family Erebidae.

== Species ==
Some species of this genus are:

- Melanephia brunneiventris (Berio, 1956)
- Melanephia cinereovariegata (Le Cerf, 1922)
- Melanephia endophaea (Hampson, 1926)
- Melanephia metarhabdota (Hampson, 1926)
- Melanephia mosara (Swinhoe, 1889)
- Melanephia nigrescens (Wallengren, 1856)
- Melanephia trista (Snellen, 1872)
- Melanephia vola (Viette, 1971)
