= Melamera =

Scientific classification
- Kingdom: Animalia
- Phylum: Arthropoda
- Class: Insecta
- Order: Lepidoptera
- Superfamily: Noctuoidea
- Family: Noctuidae
- Subfamily: Acontiinae
- Genus: Melamera; Hampson, 1910
- Species: M. velutina

Binomial name
- Melamera velutina Hampson, 1910

Genus of moths

Melamera is a monotypic moth genus of the family Noctuidae. Its only species, Melamera velutina, is found in Colombia. Both the genus and species were first described by George Hampson in 1910.
