= Monocymia =

Scientific classification
- Kingdom: Animalia
- Phylum: Arthropoda
- Class: Insecta
- Order: Lepidoptera
- Superfamily: Noctuoidea
- Family: Noctuidae
- Subfamily: Acontiinae
- Genus: Monocymia; Hampson, 1910
- Species: M. harmina

Binomial name
- Monocymia harmina (Schaus, 1904)

Synonyms
- Acontia harmina Schaus, 1904

Genus of moths

Monocymia is a monotypic moth genus of the family Noctuidae erected by George Hampson in 1910. Its only species, Monocymia harmina, was first described by Schaus in 1904. It is found in the Brazilian state of Paraná.
