= Mystomemia =

Scientific classification
- Domain: Eukaryota
- Kingdom: Animalia
- Phylum: Arthropoda
- Class: Insecta
- Order: Lepidoptera
- Superfamily: Noctuoidea
- Family: Erebidae
- Subfamily: Hypeninae
- Genus: Mystomemia; Dyar, 1919
- Species: M. hortealis

Binomial name
- Mystomemia hortealis Dyar, 1919

Genus of moths

Mystomemia is a monotypic moth genus of the family Erebidae. Its only species, Mystomemia hortealis, is found in Mexico. Both the genus and the species were first described by Harrison Gray Dyar Jr. in 1919.
