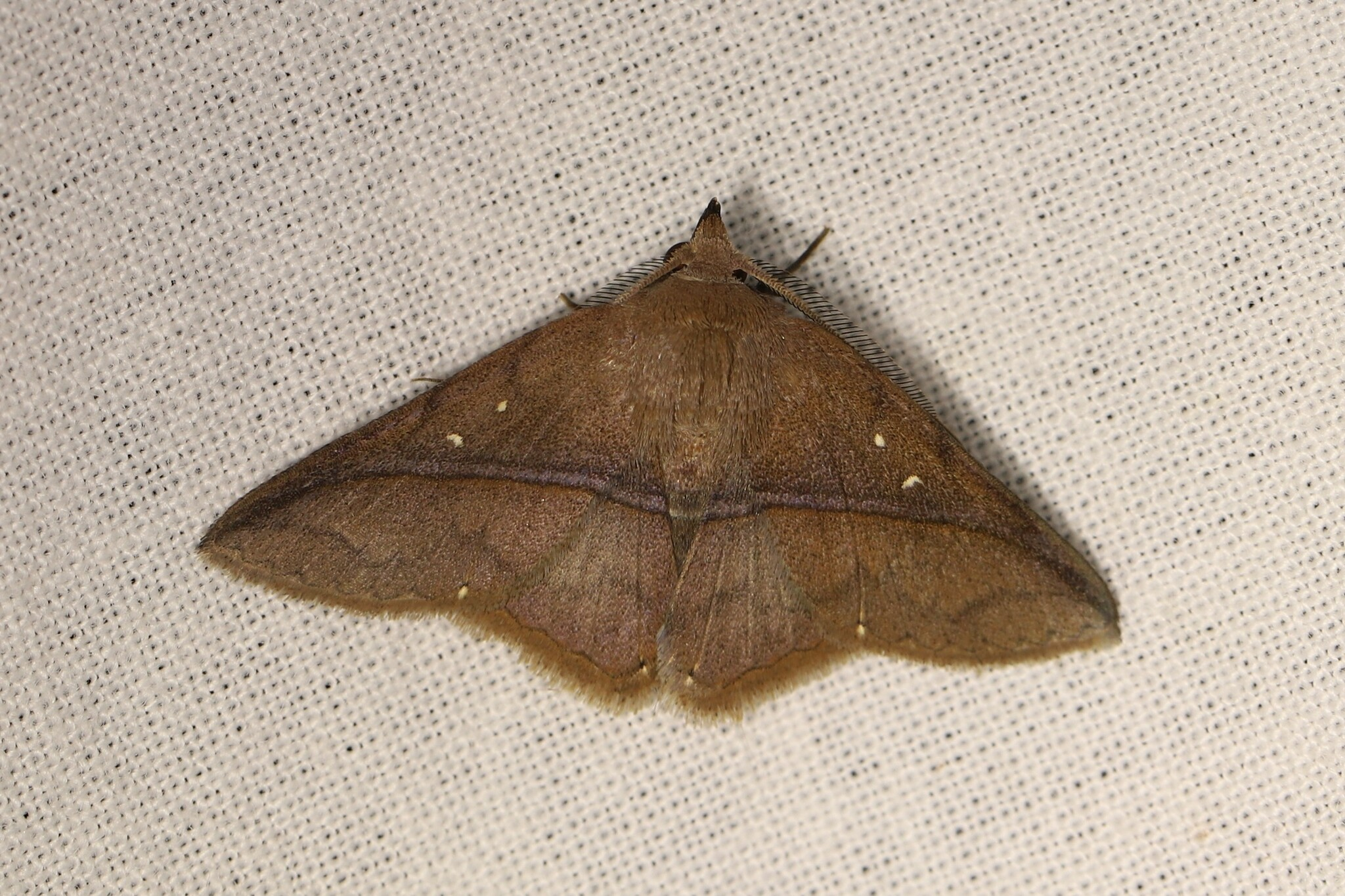
- Metaprosphera sublimpida

Scientific classification
- Kingdom: Animalia
- Phylum: Arthropoda
- Class: Insecta
- Order: Lepidoptera
- Superfamily: Noctuoidea
- Family: Erebidae
- Subfamily: Calpinae
- Genus: Metaprosphera; Hampson, 1926

= Metaprosphera =

Genus of moths

Metaprosphera is a genus of moths of the family Erebidae. The genus was erected by George Hampson in 1926.

== Species ==
- Metaprosphera modesta (Butler, 1879) Brazil (Amazonas)
- Metaprosphera sublimpida (Felder & Rogenhofer, 1874) Brazil (Amazonas)
