= Misa (moth) =

Scientific classification
- Domain: Eukaryota
- Kingdom: Animalia
- Phylum: Arthropoda
- Class: Insecta
- Order: Lepidoptera
- Superfamily: Noctuoidea
- Family: Noctuidae
- Subfamily: Agaristinae
- Genus: Misa; Karsch, 1895

Genus of moths

Misa is a genus of moths of the family Noctuidae. The genus was erected by Ferdinand Karsch in 1895.

== Taxonomy ==
The Global Lepidoptera Names Index gives this name as a synonym of Schausia Karsch, 1895.

== Species ==
- Misa cosmetica Karsch, 1898
- Misa costistrigata Bethune-Baker, 1927
- Misa memnonia Karsch, 1895
- Misa schultzei Aurivillius, 1925
