= Mesasteria =

Scientific classification
- Kingdom: Animalia
- Phylum: Arthropoda
- Class: Insecta
- Order: Lepidoptera
- Superfamily: Noctuoidea
- Family: Erebidae
- Subfamily: Calpinae
- Genus: Mesasteria; Hampson, 1926
- Species: M. sanguilinea

Binomial name
- Mesasteria sanguilinea Hampson, 1926

Genus of moths

Mesasteria is a monotypic moth genus of the family Erebidae. Its only species, Mesasteria sanguilinea, is found in Borneo. Both the genus and the species were first described by George Hampson in 1926.
