= Mictochroa =

Scientific classification
- Domain: Eukaryota
- Kingdom: Animalia
- Phylum: Arthropoda
- Class: Insecta
- Order: Lepidoptera
- Superfamily: Noctuoidea
- Family: Noctuidae
- Subfamily: Acontiinae
- Genus: Mictochroa; Druce, 1909

Genus of moths

Mictochroa is a genus of moths of the family Noctuidae.

== Species ==
- Mictochroa albirena Druce, 1909
- Mictochroa ambigua Schaus, 1911
- Mictochroa angularis Schaus, 1904
- Mictochroa caterva Schaus, 1904
- Mictochroa caulea Schaus, 1929
- Mictochroa costiplaga E. D. Jones, 1915
- Mictochroa dolens Schaus, 1911
- Mictochroa farona Schaus, 1904
- Mictochroa fasciata E. D. Jones, 1915
- Mictochroa harmonica Druce, 1909
- Mictochroa indigna Dyar, [1927]
- Mictochroa octosema Dognin, 1914
- Mictochroa pallidula E. D. Jones, 1921
- Mictochroa parigana Schaus, 1904
- Mictochroa paulata E. D. Jones, 1921
- Mictochroa pyrostrota Dognin, 1914
- Mictochroa rectilinea E. D. Jones, 1915
- Mictochroa renata E. D. Jones, 1915
- Mictochroa rhodostrota Dognin, 1914
- Mictochroa selinitis Dyar, 1912
- Mictochroa thermoptera Druce, 1909
- Mictochroa triangularis Schaus, 1904
- Mictochroa zonella Druce, 1889
