= Maliangia =

Scientific classification
- Domain: Eukaryota
- Kingdom: Animalia
- Phylum: Arthropoda
- Class: Insecta
- Order: Lepidoptera
- Superfamily: Noctuoidea
- Family: Erebidae
- Subfamily: Calpinae
- Genus: Maliangia; Berio, 1977
- Species: M. geometriformis

Binomial name
- Maliangia geometriformis Berio, 1977

Genus of moths

Maliangia is a monotypic moth genus of the family Erebidae. Its only species, Maliangia geometriformis, is found in northern Yunnan province of China. Both the genus and the species were first described by Emilio Berio in 1977.
