= Mesoruza =

Scientific classification
- Domain: Eukaryota
- Kingdom: Animalia
- Phylum: Arthropoda
- Class: Insecta
- Order: Lepidoptera
- Superfamily: Noctuoidea
- Family: Noctuidae
- Subfamily: Acontiinae
- Genus: Mesoruza; Warren in Seitz, 1913
- Species: M. kuehni

Binomial name
- Mesoruza kuehni Warren, 1913

Synonyms
- Mesoruza kühni [= kuehni] Warren, 1913; Mesoruza kühni benenotata Warren, 1913

Genus of moths

Mesoruza is a monotypic moth genus of the family Noctuidae. Its only species, Mesoruza kuehni, is found in the Kai Islands and New Guinea. Both the genus and species were first described by Warren in 1913.
