= Piratisca =

Scientific classification
- Kingdom: Animalia
- Phylum: Arthropoda
- Class: Insecta
- Order: Lepidoptera
- Superfamily: Noctuoidea
- Family: Erebidae
- Subfamily: Herminiinae
- Genus: Piratisca; Meyrick, 1902

Synonyms
- Megaloptera Bethune-Baker, 1908; Systaticospora Bethune-Baker, 1908; Megalopteroides Strand, 1910

Genus of moths

Piratisca is a genus of moths of the family Noctuidae. The genus was erected by Edward Meyrick in 1902. Both species in this genus are known from New Guinea.

== Species ==
- Piratisca minax Meyrick, 1902
- Piratisca rufotincta (Rothschild, 1915)
