= Metaplusia =

Scientific classification
- Kingdom: Animalia
- Phylum: Arthropoda
- Class: Insecta
- Order: Lepidoptera
- Superfamily: Noctuoidea
- Family: Erebidae
- Subfamily: Calpinae
- Genus: Metaplusia; Dyar, 1925

Synonyms
- Euglyphina Hampson, 1926

Genus of moths

Metaplusia is a genus of moths of the family Erebidae. The genus was erected by Harrison Gray Dyar Jr. in 1925.

== Species ==
- Metaplusia argyra (H. Druce, 1889) Mexico
- Metaplusia trichodisca Dyar, 1925 Mexico
