= Mastigophorus =

Scientific classification
- Domain: Eukaryota
- Kingdom: Animalia
- Phylum: Arthropoda
- Class: Insecta
- Order: Lepidoptera
- Superfamily: Noctuoidea
- Family: Erebidae
- Subfamily: Herminiinae
- Genus: Mastigophorus; Poey, 1832

Genus of moths

Mastigophorus is a genus of moths of the family Noctuidae described by Poey in 1832.

== Description ==
Male with palpi with first joint upcurved at base, then porrect (extending forward) extremely long and fringed with hair above. Second joint bent back at an acute angle to above vertex of head. Third joint is a flattened process with a tuft of long hair from its base. Antennae with long bristles and cilia. Thorax and abdomen smoothly scaled. Tibia slightly hairy. Forewings with slightly acute apex. Hindwings with vein 5 from near lower angle of cell.

Female with palpi with short first joint and curved or obliquely upturned second joint, which is moderate length. Third joint upturned, long and very slender. American specimens have a sheath to the fore tibia containing a mass of flocculent (wooly) scales.

== Species ==
According to Lepidoptera and Other Life Forms:

- Mastigophorus asynetalis Dyar, 1918 found in Mexico
- Mastigophorus augustus Schaus, 1916 Cayenne (French Guiana)
- Mastigophorus demissalis (Möschler, 1890) Puerto Rico, Colombia, Suriname
- Mastigophorus evadnealis Schaus, 1913 Costa Rica
- Mastigophorus jamaicalis Schaus, 1916 Jamaica
- Mastigophorus majoralis Schaus, 1916 Mexico
- Mastigophorus marima (Felder & Rogenhofer, 1874) Brazil
- Mastigophorus nomius Schaus, 1916 Cayenne
- Mastigophorus parra Poey, 1832 Cuba
