= Mormecia =

Scientific classification
- Domain: Eukaryota
- Kingdom: Animalia
- Phylum: Arthropoda
- Class: Insecta
- Order: Lepidoptera
- Superfamily: Noctuoidea
- Family: Erebidae
- Subfamily: Herminiinae
- Genus: Mormecia; Tams, 1935
- Species: M. lachnogyia

Binomial name
- Mormecia lachnogyia Tams, 1935

Genus of moths

Mormecia is a monotypic moth genus of the family Erebidae. Its only species, Mormecia lachnogyia, is known from Samoa. Both the genus and species were first described by Tams in 1935.
