= Megaloctena =

Scientific classification
- Domain: Eukaryota
- Kingdom: Animalia
- Phylum: Arthropoda
- Class: Insecta
- Order: Lepidoptera
- Superfamily: Noctuoidea
- Family: Erebidae
- Subfamily: Herminiinae
- Genus: Megaloctena; Warren in Seitz, 1913

Genus of moths

Megaloctena is a genus of moths of the family Noctuidae. The genus was described by Warren in 1913. All the species are found in western China.

== Species ==
- Megaloctena alpherakyi (Leech, 1900)
- Megaloctena angulata (Leech, 1900)
- Megaloctena mandarina (Leech, 1900)
- Megaloctena punctilinea (Leech, 1900) also found in Japan
- Megaloctena sordida (Leech, 1900)
