= Margizoides =

Scientific classification
- Domain: Eukaryota
- Kingdom: Animalia
- Phylum: Arthropoda
- Class: Insecta
- Order: Lepidoptera
- Superfamily: Noctuoidea
- Family: Erebidae
- Subfamily: Herminiinae
- Genus: Margizoides; Poole, 1989

Synonyms
- Margiza Schaus, 1916

Genus of moths

Margizoides is a genus of moths of the family Erebidae erected by Robert W. Poole in 1989.

== Species ==
- Margizoides terranea (Schaus, 1916) Guiana
- Margizoides partitalis (Dyar, 1918) Mexico
