= Mecynoptera =

Mecynoptera Schaus, 1913 is a synonym of either of two genera of moths in the family Erebidae and subfamily Calpinae:

- Radara Walker, 1862
- Cecharismena Möschler, 1890

Mecynoptera (insect) Handlirsch, 1904 is also a genus of fossil insects in the order Palaeodictyoptera

Mecynoptera (clade) Wang et al., 2013 is also a proposed clade uniting the order Phasmatodea, Embioptera, and Notoptera in Polyneoptera
