= Mimasura =

Scientific classification
- Kingdom: Animalia
- Phylum: Arthropoda
- Clade: Pancrustacea
- Class: Insecta
- Order: Lepidoptera
- Superfamily: Noctuoidea
- Family: Noctuidae
- Subfamily: Acontiinae
- Genus: Mimasura; Hampson, 1910

Genus of moths

Mimasura is a genus of moths of the family Noctuidae. The genus was erected by George Hampson in 1910.

== Species ==
- Mimasura albiceris Turner, 1903
- Mimasura asticta Hampson, 1910
- Mimasura clara Holland, 1893
- Mimasura disticta Hampson, 1910
- Mimasura impuncta Hampson, 1910
- Mimasura innotata Hampson, 1910
- Mimasura miltochristodes Hampson, 1918
- Mimasura pseudopyralis Berio, 1937
- Mimasura quadripuncta Hampson, 1910
- Mimasura simplex Rebel, 1907
- Mimasura strigicostalis Hampson, 1910
- Mimasura tripunctoides Poole, 1989
- Mimasura unipuncta Hampson, 1902
