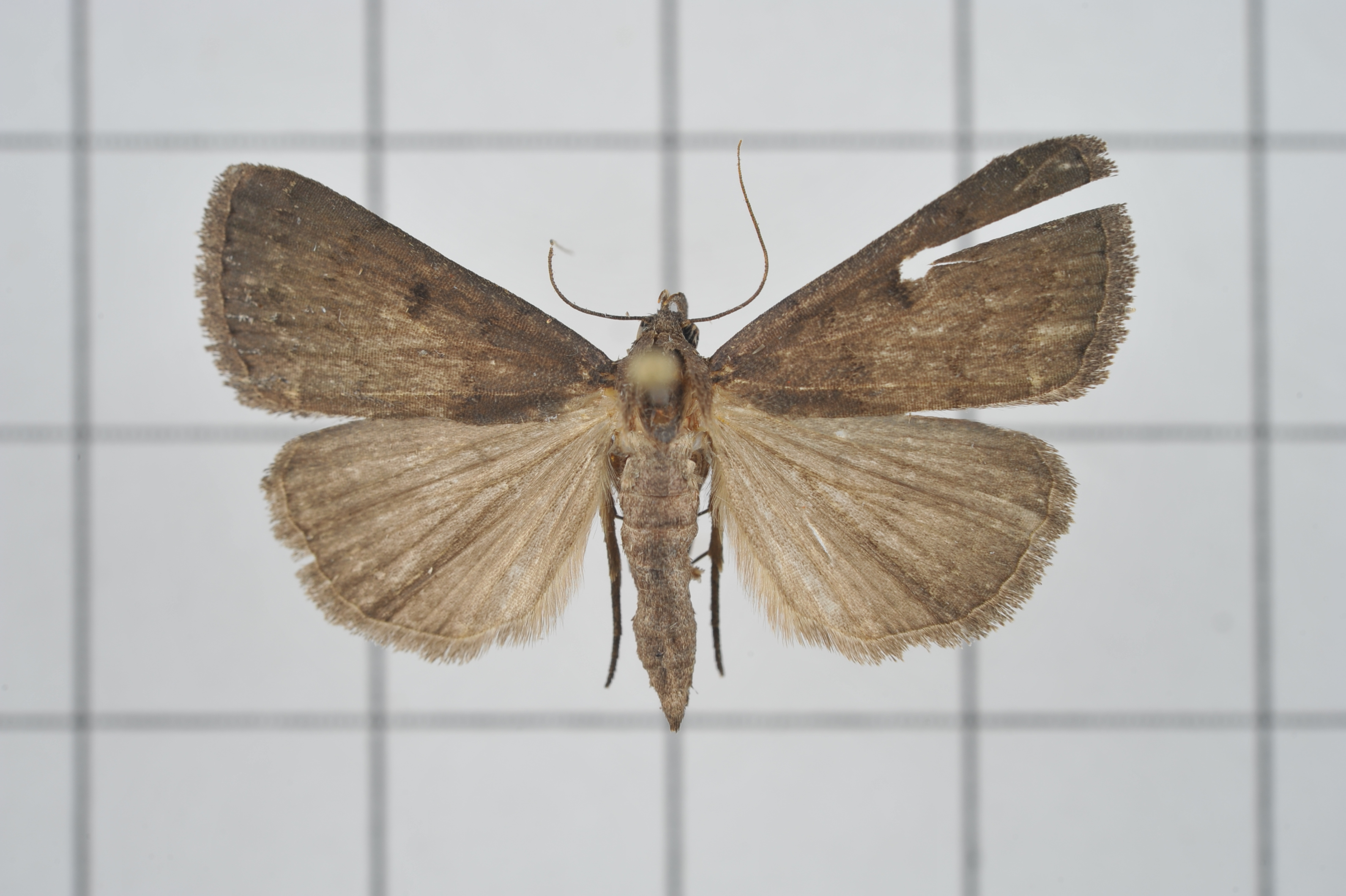

Scientific classification
- Kingdom: Animalia
- Phylum: Arthropoda
- Clade: Pancrustacea
- Class: Insecta
- Order: Lepidoptera
- Superfamily: Noctuoidea
- Family: Erebidae
- Subfamily: Herminiinae
- Genus: Mosopia; Francis Walker, [1866]

Type species
- Mosopia megaspila Walker, 1866

Synonyms
- Trotosema Butler, 1879

= Mosopia =

Genus of moths

Mosopia is a genus of moths of the family Erebidae. It is found in south-east Asia, including Thailand, Borneo and Malaysia. The genus was first described by Francis Walker in 1866 from a specimen in the British Museum. The specimen Walker describes was from Penang in Malaysia.

Walker gave Mosopia megaspila as a type species. This species has a wingspan of 39 millimetres (1.5 in) with a large distinctive black spot in the middle of each forewings (hence the name megaspila, which means "large spotted"). Three other species are also classified in the genus Mosopia.

== Species ==
In alphabetical order:

- Mosopia eudoxusalis (Walker, [1859]) Sundaland, Thailand
- Mosopia kononenkoi Holloway, 2008 Borneo, Sumatra, Peninsular Malaysia, Thailand
- Mosopia magniplaga (Swinhoe, 1905) Meghalaya
- Mosopia megaspila Walker, [1866] Peninsular Malaysia, Borneo
- Mosopia pallidusalis Holloway, 2008 Borneo
- Mosopia sordidum (Butler, 1879) Japan, Korea
