= Microselene =

Scientific classification
- Kingdom: Animalia
- Phylum: Arthropoda
- Class: Insecta
- Order: Lepidoptera
- Superfamily: Noctuoidea
- Family: Erebidae
- Subfamily: Calpinae
- Genus: Microselene; Hampson, 1926

Genus of moths

Microselene is a genus of moths of the family Erebidae. The genus was erected by George Hampson in 1926.

== Species ==
- Microselene mesostipa Hampson, 1926 north-eastern Himalayas, Peninsular Malaysia, Borneo
- Microselene mopsa (C. Swinhoe, 1890) north-eastern Himalayas, Myanmar, Thailand, Peninsular Malaysia, Taiwan, Borneo
