= Maraschia =

Scientific classification
- Domain: Eukaryota
- Kingdom: Animalia
- Phylum: Arthropoda
- Class: Insecta
- Order: Lepidoptera
- Superfamily: Noctuoidea
- Family: Noctuidae
- Genus: Maraschia; Osthelder in Osthelder & Pfeiffer, 1933

Genus of moths

Maraschia is a genus of moths of the family Noctuidae.

== Species ==
- Maraschia grisescens Osthelder, 1933
