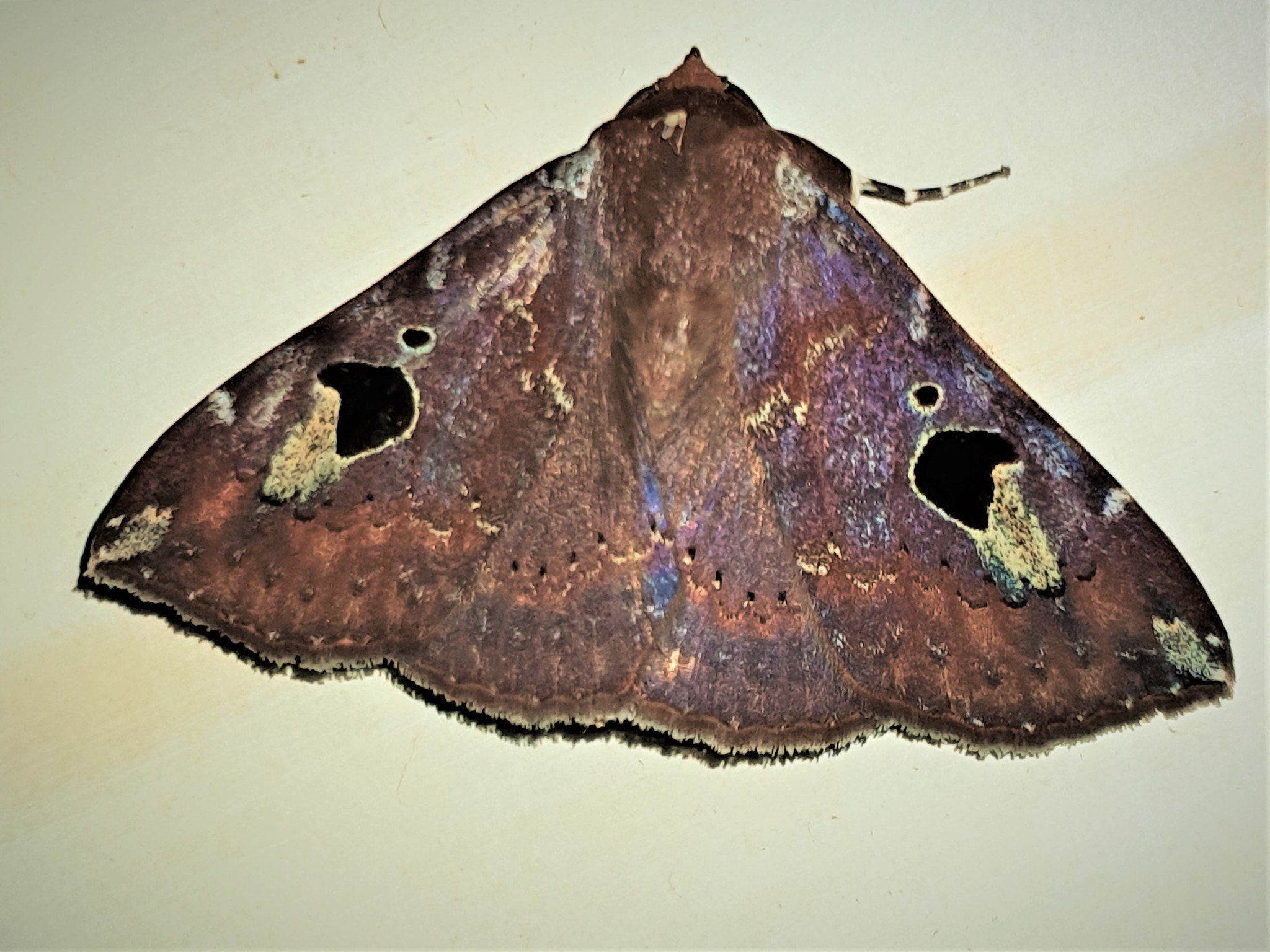
- Obroatis distincta

Scientific classification
- Kingdom: Animalia
- Phylum: Arthropoda
- Class: Insecta
- Order: Lepidoptera
- Superfamily: Noctuoidea
- Family: Erebidae
- Subfamily: Calpinae
- Genus: Obroatis; Walker, 1858

Synonyms
- Molynda Walker, 1858

= Obroatis =

Genus of moths

Obroatis is a genus of moths of the family Erebidae. The genus was erected by Francis Walker in 1858.

== Species ==
- Obroatis chloropis Hampson, 1926
- Obroatis columba Butler, 1879
- Obroatis curvilineata Dognin, 1912
- Obroatis distincta Butler, 1879
- Obroatis ellops Guenée, 1852
- Obroatis gatena Schaus, 1912
- Obroatis humeralis Walker, 1858
- Obroatis licentiata Dognin, 1914
- Obroatis negata Walker, 1858
- Obroatis nigriscripta Dognin, 1912
- Obroatis ocellata Butler, 1879
- Obroatis reniplaga Schaus, 1912
- Obroatis rhodocraspis Hampson, 1924
- Obroatis rivularis Butler, 1879
- Obroatis rufa Schaus, 1904
- Obroatis signata Butler, 1879
- Obroatis vinea Schaus, 1911
