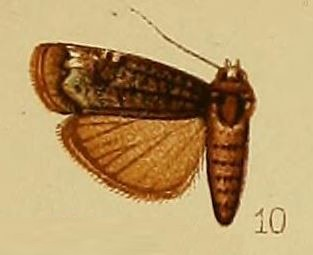

Scientific classification
- Kingdom: Animalia
- Phylum: Arthropoda
- Class: Insecta
- Order: Lepidoptera
- Superfamily: Noctuoidea
- Family: Erebidae
- Subfamily: Calpinae
- Genus: Mesogenea; Hampson, 1902

= Mesogenea =

Genus of moths

Mesogenea is a genus of moths of the family Erebidae. The genus was erected by George Hampson in 1902.

== Species ==
Some species of this genus are:

- Mesogenea costimacula Hampson, 1926
- Mesogenea excavata Hampson, 1926
- Mesogenea persinuosa Hampson, 1910
- Mesogenea varians Hampson, 1902
