= Marcipalina =

Scientific classification
- Domain: Eukaryota
- Kingdom: Animalia
- Phylum: Arthropoda
- Class: Insecta
- Order: Lepidoptera
- Superfamily: Noctuoidea
- Family: Erebidae
- Subfamily: Calpinae
- Genus: Marcipalina; Pelletier, 1978

Genus of moths

Marcipalina is a genus of moths of the family Erebidae. The genus was erected by Jean Pelletier in 1978.

== Species ==
- Marcipalina albescens (Pelletier, 1975) Ivory Coast
- Marcipalina berioi (Pelletier, 1975) Zaire
- Marcipalina clenchi (Pelletier, 1975) Cameroon
- Marcipalina confluens (Hampson, 1926) Ghana, Ivory Coast, Cameroon, Guinea
- Marcipalina conjuncta (Gaede, 1939) Ivory Coast, Cameroon, Zaire, Uganda
- Marcipalina detersa (Holland, 1894) Gabon
- Marcipalina grisescens Pelletier, 1978 Uganda
- Marcipalina hayesi (Pelletier, 1975) Gabon, Zaire, Uganda
- Marcipalina laportei (Pelletier, 1975) Gabon, Cameroon, Zaire
- Marcipalina lineata Pelletier, 1978 Cameroon
- Marcipalina lutea Pelletier, 1978 Gabon, Cameroon, Zaire
- Marcipalina melanoconia (Hampson, 1926) Ghana, Cameroon, Central African Republic
- Marcipalina minima Pelletier, 1978 Zair, Central African Republic, Uganda
- Marcipalina modesta Pelletier, 1979 Cameroon, Gabon
- Marcipalina obscura Pelletier, 1978 Uganda
- Marcipalina pustulata (Holland, 1894) Ivory Coast, Gabon, Guinea, Zaire, Rwanda
- Marcipalina rubra Pelletier, 1978 Uganda
- Marcipalina ruptisignoides Pelletier, 1978 Ivory Coast, Cameroon, Gabon, Guinea, Central African Republic, Zaire, Congo, Uganda
- Marcipalina submarginalis (Gaede, 1939) Zaire
- Marcipalina tanzaniensis (Pelletier, 1975) Tanzania
- Marcipalina triangulifera (Holland, 1894) Gabon, Equatorial Guinea, Cameroon
- Marcipalina umbrosa (Holland, 1894) Ivory Coast, Gabon, Zaire, Uganda
- Marcipalina violacea (Pelletier, 1974) Gabon, Cameroon
