= Mesocopsis =

Scientific classification
- Domain: Eukaryota
- Kingdom: Animalia
- Phylum: Arthropoda
- Class: Insecta
- Order: Lepidoptera
- Superfamily: Noctuoidea
- Family: Noctuidae
- Subfamily: Acontiinae
- Genus: Mesocopsis; Warren in Seitz, 1913
- Species: M. posticata

Binomial name
- Mesocopsis posticata (Walker, 1866)

Synonyms
- Eupithecia posticata Walker, 1866

Genus of moths

Mesocopsis is a monotypic moth genus of the family Noctuidae described by Warren in 1913. Its only species, Mesocopsis posticata, was first described by Francis Walker in 1866. It is found in Borneo.
