= Maronis =

Scientific classification
- Kingdom: Animalia
- Phylum: Arthropoda
- Clade: Pancrustacea
- Class: Insecta
- Order: Lepidoptera
- Superfamily: Noctuoidea
- Family: Erebidae
- Subfamily: Calpinae
- Genus: Maronis; Saalmüller, 1891
- Species: M. rivosa

Binomial name
- Maronis rivosa Saalmüller, 1891

Genus of moths

Maronis is a monotypic moth genus of the family Erebidae. Its only species, Maronis rivosa, is found on Madagascar. Both the genus and species were first described by Saalmüller in 1891.
