= Mareura =

Scientific classification
- Kingdom: Animalia
- Phylum: Arthropoda
- Class: Insecta
- Order: Lepidoptera
- Superfamily: Noctuoidea
- Family: Erebidae
- Subfamily: Calpinae
- Genus: Mareura; Walker, 1865
- Species: M. aurilinea

Binomial name
- Mareura aurilinea Walker, 1865

Genus of moths

Mareura is a monotypic moth genus of the family Erebidae. Its only species, Mareura aurilinea, is found in the Brazilian state of Amazonas. Both the genus and species were first described by Francis Walker in 1865.
