= Masoga =

Scientific classification
- Kingdom: Animalia
- Phylum: Arthropoda
- Class: Insecta
- Order: Lepidoptera
- Superfamily: Noctuoidea
- Family: Erebidae
- Subfamily: Calpinae
- Genus: Masoga; Walker, 1863

Type species
- Masoga panagralis Walker, 1863

Synonyms
- Pelodia Schaus, 1913

Genus of moths

Masoga is a genus of moths of the family Erebidae. The genus was erected by Francis Walker in 1863.

== Species ==
- Masoga bipunctoides Poole, 1989 Argentina (Tucuman)
- Masoga panagralis Walker, 1863 Brazil (Rio de Janeiro)
- Masoga peracuta (Dognin, 1914) Brazil (Rio de Janeiro)
- Masoga rava (Schaus, 1913) Costa Rica
