= Marcillada =

Scientific classification
- Kingdom: Animalia
- Phylum: Arthropoda
- Class: Insecta
- Order: Lepidoptera
- Superfamily: Noctuoidea
- Family: Erebidae
- Subfamily: Calpinae
- Genus: Marcillada; Walker, 1865

Synonyms
- Nasaya Moore, 1882

Genus of moths

Marcillada is a genus of moths of the family Erebidae. The genus was erected by Francis Walker in 1865.

== Species ==
- Marcillada endopolia Hampson, 1926 Borneo, Sumatra, Java
- Marcillada rubricosa Walker, 1865 Cambodia
