= Marzigetta =

Scientific classification
- Kingdom: Animalia
- Phylum: Arthropoda
- Class: Insecta
- Order: Lepidoptera
- Superfamily: Noctuoidea
- Family: Erebidae
- Subfamily: Herminiinae
- Genus: Marzigetta; Dyar, 1918
- Species: M. obliqua

Binomial name
- Marzigetta obliqua Dyar, 1918

Genus of moths

Marzigetta is a monotypic moth genus of the family Erebidae. Its only species, Marzigetta obliqua, is known from Mexico. Both the genus and the species were first described by Harrison Gray Dyar Jr. in 1918.
