= Metaxyllia =

Scientific classification
- Kingdom: Animalia
- Phylum: Arthropoda
- Class: Insecta
- Order: Lepidoptera
- Superfamily: Noctuoidea
- Family: Noctuidae
- Subfamily: Acontiinae
- Genus: Metaxyllia; Dyar, 1922
- Species: M. metallicella

Binomial name
- Metaxyllia metallicella Dyar, 1922

Genus of moths

Metaxyllia is a monotypic moth genus of the family Noctuidae. Its only species, Metaxyllia metallicella, is found in Mexico. Both the genus and species were first described by Harrison Gray Dyar Jr. in 1922.
