= Micrapatetis =

Scientific classification
- Kingdom: Animalia
- Phylum: Arthropoda
- Class: Insecta
- Order: Lepidoptera
- Superfamily: Noctuoidea
- Family: Noctuidae
- Subfamily: Acontiinae
- Genus: Micrapatetis; Meyrick, 1897

Genus of moths

Micrapatetis is a genus of moths of the family Noctuidae. The genus was erected by Edward Meyrick in 1897.

== Species ==
- Micrapatetis albiviata Hampson, 1910
- Micrapatetis flavipars Hampson, 1910
- Micrapatetis icela Turner, 1920
- Micrapatetis leucozona Turner, 1902
- Micrapatetis orthozona Meyrick, 1897
- Micrapatetis pyrastis Hampson, 1910
