= Modunga =

Scientific classification
- Kingdom: Animalia
- Phylum: Arthropoda
- Class: Insecta
- Order: Lepidoptera
- Superfamily: Noctuoidea
- Family: Erebidae
- Subfamily: Hypeninae
- Genus: Modunga; Walker, 1863
- Species: M. palpigera

Binomial name
- Modunga palpigera Walker, 1863

Genus of moths

Modunga is a monotypic moth genus of the family Erebidae. Its only species, Modunga palpigera, is known from Borneo. Both the genus and the species were first described by Francis Walker in 1863.
