= Manoblemma =

Scientific classification
- Domain: Eukaryota
- Kingdom: Animalia
- Phylum: Arthropoda
- Class: Insecta
- Order: Lepidoptera
- Superfamily: Noctuoidea
- Family: Noctuidae
- Subfamily: Acontiinae
- Genus: Manoblemma; Yoshimoto, 1999
- Species: M. cryptica

Binomial name
- Manoblemma cryptica Yoshimoto, 1999

Genus of moths

Manoblemma is a monotypic moth genus of the family Noctuidae. Its only species, Manoblemma cryptica, is found in Japan. Both the genus and species were first described by Yoshimoto in 1999.
