= Michelliana =

Scientific classification
- Kingdom: Animalia
- Phylum: Arthropoda
- Class: Insecta
- Order: Lepidoptera
- Superfamily: Noctuoidea
- Family: Noctuidae
- Genus: Michelliana

Genus of moths

Michelliana is a genus of moths of the family Noctuidae.
