= Maschukia =

Scientific classification
- Kingdom: Animalia
- Phylum: Arthropoda
- Class: Insecta
- Order: Lepidoptera
- Superfamily: Noctuoidea
- Family: Noctuidae
- Genus: Maschukia

Subgenus of moths

Maschukia is a subgenus of moths of the family Noctuidae.
