= Micranthops =

Scientific classification
- Kingdom: Animalia
- Phylum: Arthropoda
- Class: Insecta
- Order: Lepidoptera
- Superfamily: Noctuoidea
- Family: Erebidae
- Subfamily: Calpinae
- Genus: Micranthops; Hampson, 1926
- Species: M. alceste

Binomial name
- Micranthops alceste (H. Druce, 1890)

Synonyms
- Capnodes alceste Druce, 1890

Genus of moths

Micranthops is a monotypic moth genus of the family Erebidae erected by George Hampson in 1926. Its only species, Micranthops alceste, was first described by Herbert Druce in 1890. It is only found in Panama.
