= Megistoclisma =

Scientific classification
- Kingdom: Animalia
- Phylum: Arthropoda
- Class: Insecta
- Order: Lepidoptera
- Superfamily: Noctuoidea
- Family: Noctuidae (?)
- Subfamily: Catocalinae
- Genus: Megistoclisma; Hampson, 1913
- Species: M. ribbei

Binomial name
- Megistoclisma ribbei Pagenstecher, 1886

Genus of moths

Megistoclisma is a monotypic moth genus of the family Noctuidae erected by George Hampson in 1913. Its only species, Megistoclisma ribbei, was first described by Pagenstecher in 1886.
