= Mitothemma =

Scientific classification
- Domain: Eukaryota
- Kingdom: Animalia
- Phylum: Arthropoda
- Class: Insecta
- Order: Lepidoptera
- Superfamily: Noctuoidea
- Family: Erebidae
- Subfamily: Calpinae
- Genus: Mitothemma; Butler, 1883

Genus of moths

Mitothemma is a genus of moths of the family Erebidae. The genus was erected by Arthur Gardiner Butler in 1883.

== Species ==
- Mitothemma acuminata Butler, 1883
- Mitothemma angulipennis Butler, 1883
- Mitothemma striata Butler, 1883
