= Maghadena =

Scientific classification
- Kingdom: Animalia
- Phylum: Arthropoda
- Clade: Pancrustacea
- Class: Insecta
- Order: Lepidoptera
- Superfamily: Noctuoidea
- Family: Noctuidae
- Genus: Maghadena

Genus of moths

Maghadena is a genus of moths of the family Noctuidae found in Madagascar.

== Species ==
- Maghadena andringitrensis
- Maghadena balachowskyi
- Maghadena betsileo
- Maghadena boby (Viette, 1960)
- Maghadena dokoa
- Maghadena duberneti
- Maghadena ingridae
- Maghadena malagasy
- Maghadena norma
- Maghadena radama
