= Miniophyllodes =

Scientific classification
- Domain: Eukaryota
- Kingdom: Animalia
- Phylum: Arthropoda
- Class: Insecta
- Order: Lepidoptera
- Superfamily: Noctuoidea
- Family: Noctuidae (?)
- Subfamily: Catocalinae
- Genus: Miniophyllodes de Joannis, 1912

Genus of moths

Miniophyllodes is a genus of moths of the family Erebidae. The genus was erected by Joseph de Joannis in 1912.

== Species ==
- Miniophyllodes aurora de Joannis, 1912
- Miniophyllodes sikorai Viette, 1974
