= Metopta =

Scientific classification
- Domain: Eukaryota
- Kingdom: Animalia
- Phylum: Arthropoda
- Class: Insecta
- Order: Lepidoptera
- Superfamily: Noctuoidea
- Family: Noctuidae (?)
- Subfamily: Catocalinae
- Genus: Metopta; C. Swinhoe, 1900
- Species: M. rectifasciata

Binomial name
- Metopta rectifasciata (Ménétries, 1863)

Synonyms
- Generic: Giacla Walker, 1855; Specific: Spirama rectifasciata Ménétries, 1863; Spirama japonica Walker, 1865; Spirama interlineata Butler, 1871

Genus of moths

Metopta is a monotypic moth genus of the family Erebidae erected by Charles Swinhoe in 1900. Its only species, Metopta rectifasciata, was first described by Édouard Ménétries in 1863. It is found in Korea and Japan.
