= Musothyma =

Scientific classification
- Kingdom: Animalia
- Phylum: Arthropoda
- Class: Insecta
- Order: Lepidoptera
- Superfamily: Noctuoidea
- Family: Noctuidae
- Genus: Musothyma; Meyrick, 1897

Genus of moths

Musothyma is a genus of moths of the family Noctuidae.

== Species ==
- Musothyma cyanastis Meyrick, 1897
