= Margana =

Scientific classification
- Kingdom: Animalia
- Phylum: Arthropoda
- Class: Insecta
- Order: Lepidoptera
- Superfamily: Noctuoidea
- Family: Erebidae
- Subfamily: Calpinae
- Genus: Margana; Walker, [1866]

Genus of moths

Margana is a genus of moths of the family Erebidae. The genus was erected by Francis Walker in 1866.

Butterflies and Moths of the World gives this name as a synonym of Egnasia Walker, 1859.

== Species ==
- Margana seclusalis Walker, [1866] Java
- Margana tenuilinea (Swinhoe, 1905) Sumatra and possibly Borneo
