= Margelana =

Scientific classification
- Domain: Eukaryota
- Kingdom: Animalia
- Phylum: Arthropoda
- Class: Insecta
- Order: Lepidoptera
- Superfamily: Noctuoidea
- Family: Noctuidae
- Genus: Margelana; Staudinger, 1888

Genus of moths

Margelana is a genus of moths of the family Noctuidae.

== Species ==
- Margelana brunnea Fibiger, Zahiri & Kononenko, 2007
- Margelana flavidior F. Wagner, 1931
  - Margelana flavidior flavidior F. Wagner, 1931
  - Margelana flavidior ochrea Brandt, 1941
- Margelana versicolor Staudinger, 1888
