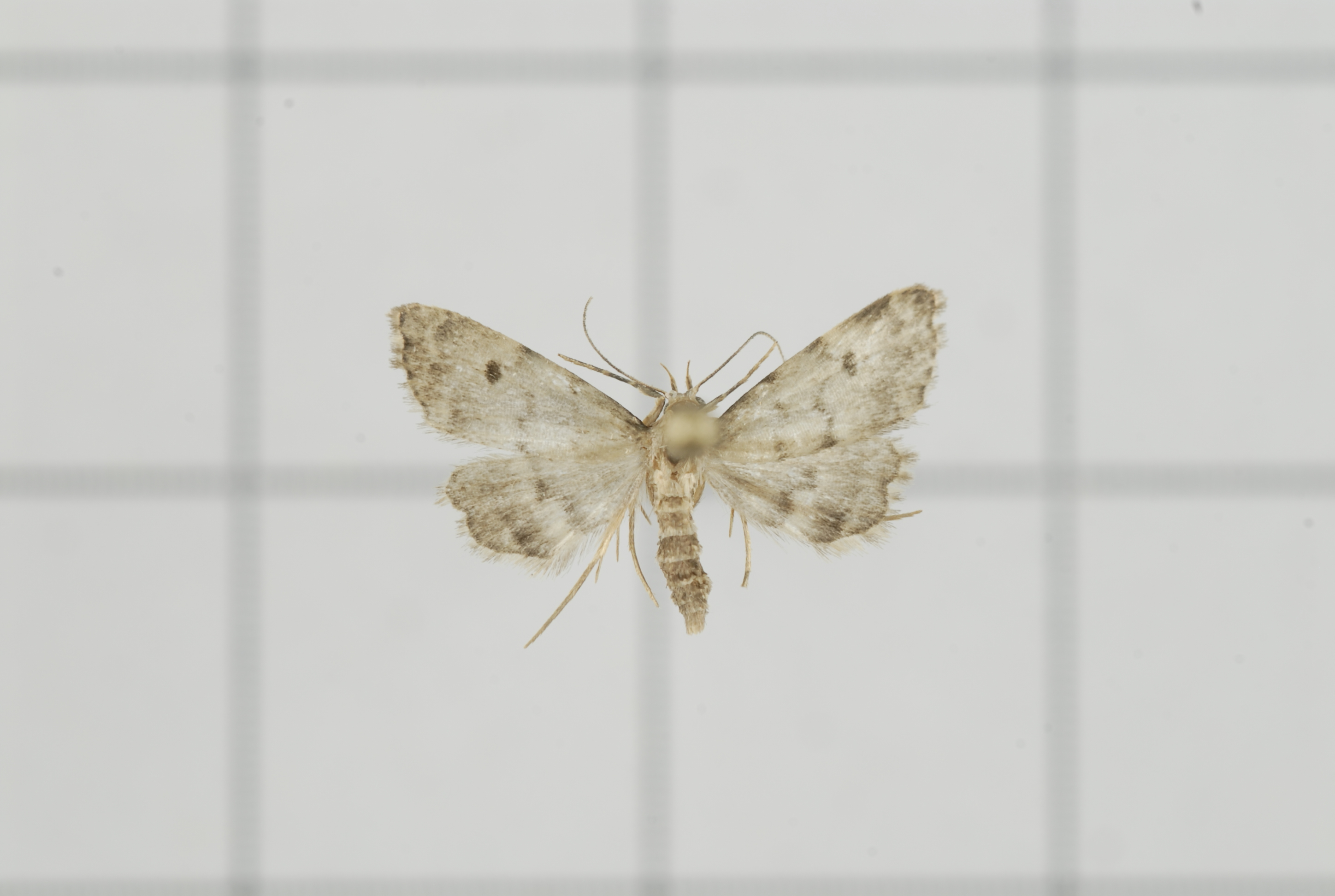

Scientific classification
- Domain: Eukaryota
- Kingdom: Animalia
- Phylum: Arthropoda
- Class: Insecta
- Order: Lepidoptera
- Superfamily: Noctuoidea
- Family: Erebidae
- Subfamily: Calpinae
- Genus: Micreremites

= Micreremites =

Genus of moths

Micreremites is a genus of moths of the family Noctuidae.

== Species ==
- Micreremites rasalis Warren, 1891
