= Mimeugoa =

Scientific classification
- Kingdom: Animalia
- Phylum: Arthropoda
- Class: Insecta
- Order: Lepidoptera
- Superfamily: Noctuoidea
- Family: Erebidae
- Subfamily: Calpinae
- Genus: Mimeugoa; Hampson, 1895
- Species: M. bifasciata

Binomial name
- Mimeugoa bifasciata (Hampson, 1894)

Synonyms
- Anachrostis bifasciata Hampson, 1894

Genus of moths

Mimeugoa is a monotypic moth genus of the family Erebidae. Its only species, Mimeugoa bifasciata, is found in Simla, Pakistan. Both the genus and species were first described by George Hampson, the genus in 1895 and the species a year earlier in 1894.
