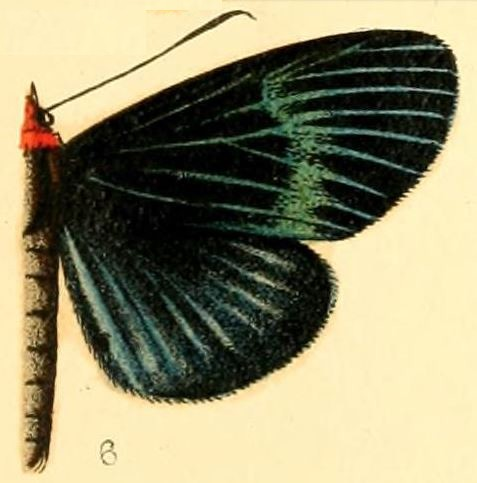
- Massaga monteirona

Scientific classification
- Kingdom: Animalia
- Phylum: Arthropoda
- Class: Insecta
- Order: Lepidoptera
- Superfamily: Noctuoidea
- Family: Noctuidae
- Subfamily: Agaristinae
- Genus: Massaga; Walker, 1854

Synonyms
- Massagidia Hampson, 1901

= Massaga =

Genus of moths

Massaga is a genus of moths of the family Noctuidae. The genus was erected by Francis Walker in 1854.

== Species ==
- Massaga angustifascia Rothschild, 1896
- Massaga hesparia Cramer, [1775]
- Massaga maritona Butler, 1868
- Massaga monteirona Butler, 1874
- Massaga noncoba Kiriakoff, 1974
- Massaga tenuifascia Hampson, 1901
- Massaga virescens Butler, 1874
- Massaga xenia Jordan, 1913
