= Mekrania =

Scientific classification
- Domain: Eukaryota
- Kingdom: Animalia
- Phylum: Arthropoda
- Class: Insecta
- Order: Lepidoptera
- Superfamily: Noctuoidea
- Family: Erebidae
- Subfamily: Hypeninae
- Genus: Mekrania; Brandt, 1941

Genus of moths

Mekrania is a genus of moths of the family Erebidae. The genus was erected by Wilhelm Brandt in 1941.

The Global Lepidoptera Names Index gives this name as a synonym of Megarenia Hampson.

== Species ==
- Mekrania obliqualis Wiltshire, 1982 Saudi Arabia
- Mekrania punctalis Brandt, 1941 Iran
