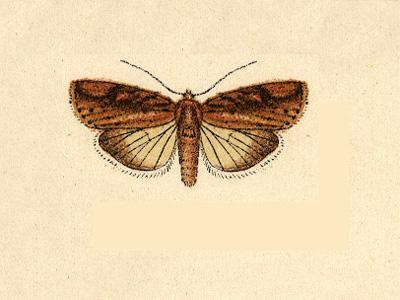
- Macapta albivitta

Scientific classification
- Kingdom: Animalia
- Phylum: Arthropoda
- Class: Insecta
- Order: Lepidoptera
- Superfamily: Noctuoidea
- Family: Noctuidae
- Genus: Macapta; Hampson, 1910

Synonyms
- Makapta Schaus, 1906

= Macapta =

Genus of moths

Macapta is a genus of moths of the family Noctuidae.

== Species ==
- Macapta albivitta Hampson, 1910
- Macapta carnescens (Schaus, 1906)
- Macapta dileuca Hampson, 1910
- Macapta grisea (Kohler, 1968)
- Macapta holophaea H. Druce, 1908
- Macapta lurida (Schaus, 1894)
- Macapta lydia E. D. Jones, 1912
- Macapta marginata (Schaus, 1904)
- Macapta mursa (Schaus, 1894)
- Macapta niveigutta (Schaus, 1904)
- Macapta obliqua E. D. Jones, 1915
- Macapta psectrocera Hampson, 1910
- Macapta rubrescens Hampson, 1910
