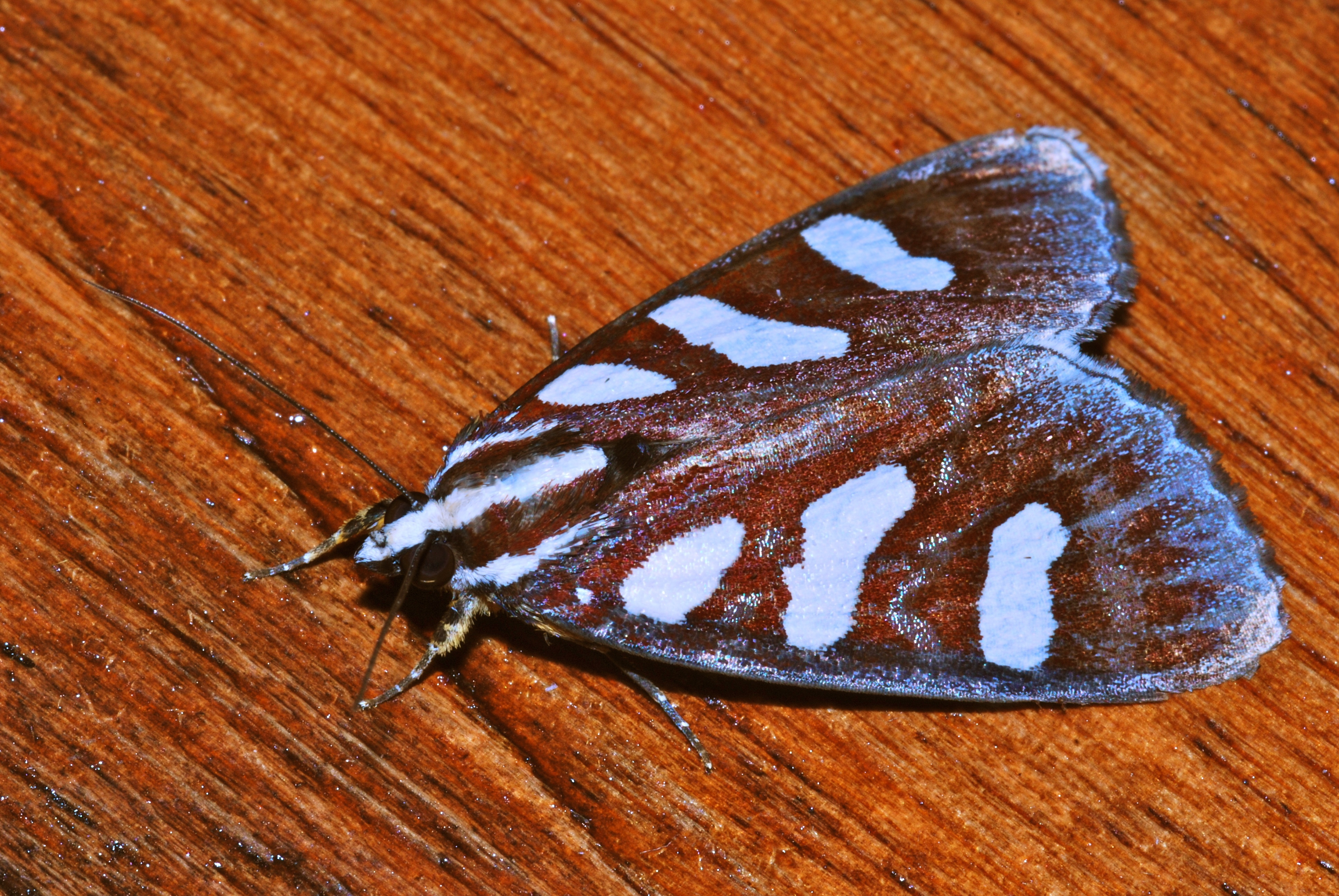
- Mimeusemia perakana

Scientific classification
- Domain: Eukaryota
- Kingdom: Animalia
- Phylum: Arthropoda
- Class: Insecta
- Order: Lepidoptera
- Superfamily: Noctuoidea
- Family: Noctuidae
- Subfamily: Agaristinae
- Genus: Mimeusemia; Butler, 1875

= Mimeusemia =

Genus of moths

Mimeusemia is a genus of moths of the family Noctuidae first described by Arthur Gardiner Butler in 1875. Species are found in Japan, India, Sri Lanka and Myanmar.

== Description ==
Veins 9 and 10 of the forewing both anastomosing (fusing) with veins 7 and 8 to form an areole. Claspers of male are large.

== Species ==
- Mimeusemia accurata Swinhoe, 1889
- Mimeusemia albicilia Hampson, 1894
- Mimeusemia amanda Kishida, 1993
- Mimeusemia basalis Walker, 1854
- Mimeusemia centralis Rothschild, 1896
- Mimeusemia ceylonica Hampson, 1893
- Mimeusemia davidsoni Swinhoe, 1899
- Mimeusemia econia Hampson, 1900
- Mimeusemia limbata Jordan, 1939
- Mimeusemia lombokensis Rothschild, 1897
- Mimeusemia perakana Rothschild, 1896
- Mimeusemia persimilis Butler, 1875
- Mimeusemia peshwa Moore, 1858
- Mimeusemia postica Walker, 1862
- Mimeusemia puciola Druce, 1895
- Mimeusemia semyron Herrich-Schäffer, [1853]
- Mimeusemia simplex Lucas, 1891
- Mimeusemia vilemani Hampson, 1911
- Mimeusemia vittata Butler, 1875
