= Mecodinops =

Scientific classification
- Kingdom: Animalia
- Phylum: Arthropoda
- Class: Insecta
- Order: Lepidoptera
- Superfamily: Noctuoidea
- Family: Erebidae
- Subfamily: Calpinae
- Genus: Mecodinops; Hampson, 1926

Synonyms
- Mazacyla Hampson, 1926

Genus of moths

Mecodinops is a genus of moths of the family Erebidae. The genus was erected by George Hampson in 1926.

== Species ==
- Mecodinops anceps (Mabille, 1879)
- Mecodinops relata Walker, 1858
- Mecodinops subpicta Schaus, 1911
