= Malagonia =

Scientific classification
- Kingdom: Animalia
- Phylum: Arthropoda
- Class: Insecta
- Order: Lepidoptera
- Superfamily: Noctuoidea
- Family: Erebidae
- Subfamily: Calpinae
- Genus: Malagonia; Hampson, 1926

Genus of moths

Malagonia is a genus of moths of the family Erebidae. The genus was erected by George Hampson in 1926.

== Species ==
- Malagonia acypera (Hampson, 1902) north-east Himalayas
- Malagonia sundana Holloway, 2005 Borneo, Sumatra
