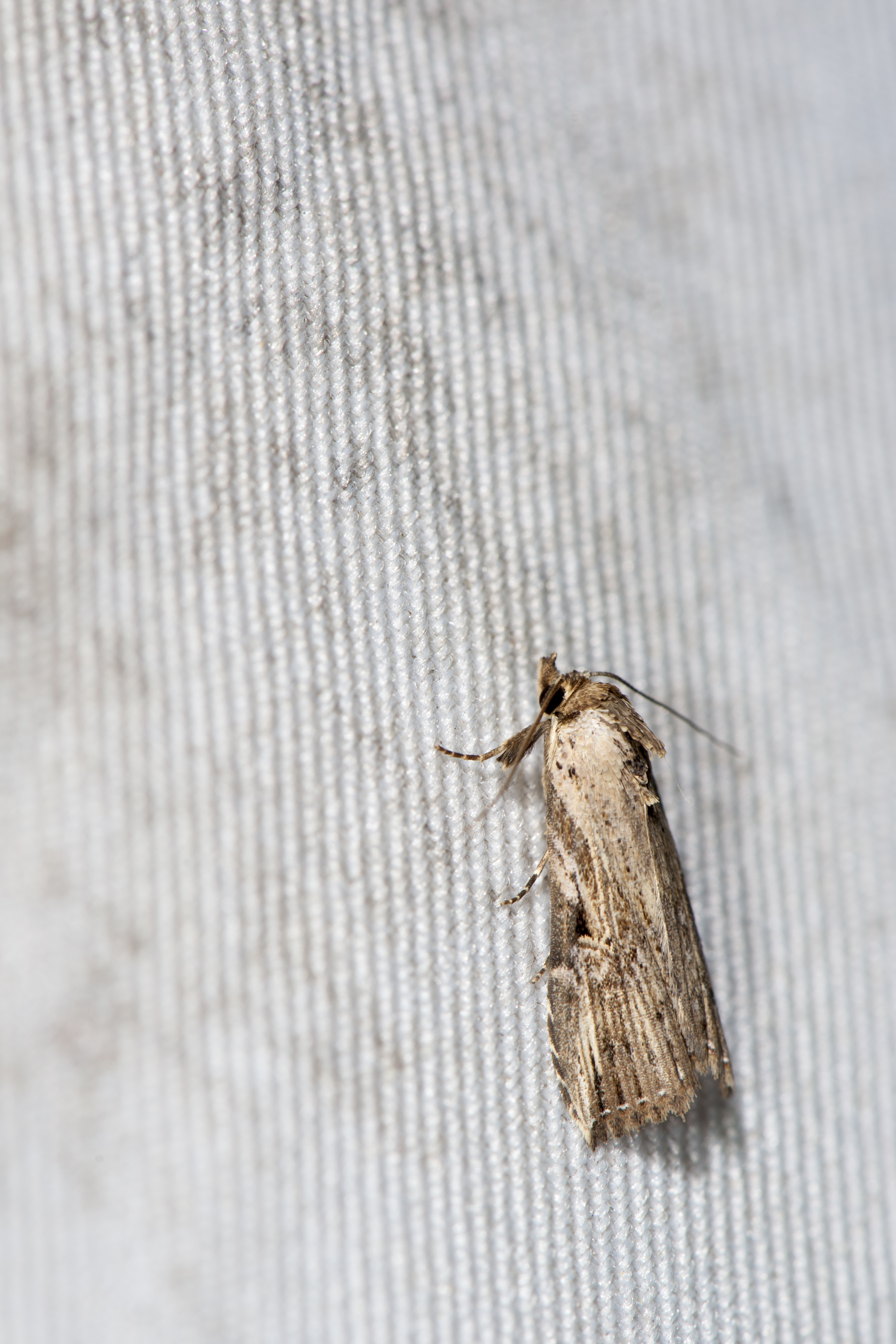
- Microxyla confusa is one of the species in this genus

Scientific classification
- Kingdom: Animalia
- Phylum: Arthropoda
- Clade: Pancrustacea
- Class: Insecta
- Order: Lepidoptera
- Superfamily: Noctuoidea
- Family: Erebidae
- Subfamily: Calpinae
- Genus: Microxyla; Sugi in Inoue, Sugi, Kuroko, Moriuti & Kawabe, 1982

= Microxyla =

Genus of moths

Microxyla is a genus of moths of the family Erebidae. The genus was erected by Shigero Sugi in 1982.

== Species ==
- Microxyla stipata (Walker, 1863) Sri Lanka, southern India, Borneo
- Microxyla confusa (Wileman, 1911) Japan
