= Mesophractias =

Scientific classification
- Domain: Eukaryota
- Kingdom: Animalia
- Phylum: Arthropoda
- Class: Insecta
- Order: Lepidoptera
- Superfamily: Noctuoidea
- Family: Noctuidae
- Subfamily: Acontiinae
- Genus: Mesophractias; Warren in Seitz, 1913

Genus of moths

Mesophractias is a genus of moths of the family Noctuidae. The genus was described by Warren in 1913.

== Species ==
- Mesophractias alstoni (Hampson, 1907) Sri Lanka
- Mesophractias falcatalis (Hampson, 1894) Sikkim in India
