= Microphaea =

Scientific classification
- Kingdom: Animalia
- Phylum: Arthropoda
- Class: Insecta
- Order: Lepidoptera
- Superfamily: Noctuoidea
- Family: Noctuidae
- Subfamily: Acontiinae
- Genus: Microphaea; Hampson, 1910

Genus of moths

Microphaea is a genus of moths of the family Noctuidae. The genus was erected by George Hampson in 1910.

== Species ==
- Microphaea acidaliata Dognin, 1914 Ecuador
- Microphaea griseata Hampson, 1910 Brazil (Espito Santo)
- Microphaea nyctichroa Hampson, 1910 Panama
- Microphaea orientalis Hampson, 1918 Borneo
