= Mesaegle =

Scientific classification
- Domain: Eukaryota
- Kingdom: Animalia
- Phylum: Arthropoda
- Class: Insecta
- Order: Lepidoptera
- Superfamily: Noctuoidea
- Family: Erebidae
- Subfamily: Calpinae
- Genus: Mesaegle; Dumont, 1922
- Species: M. gouzzakouli

Binomial name
- Mesaegle gouzzakouli Dumont, 1922

Genus of moths

Mesaegle is a monotypic moth genus of the family Erebidae. Its only species, Mesaegle gouzzakouli, is found in Algeria. Both the genus and species were first described by Constantin Dumont in 1922.
