= Microphisa =

Microphisa Boisduval, 1840 is a synonym of either of two genera of moths in the family Erebidae and subfamily Boletobiinae:

- Odice Hübner, [1823]
- Eublemma Hübner, 1829
