= Machaeropalpus =

Scientific classification
- Domain: Eukaryota
- Kingdom: Animalia
- Phylum: Arthropoda
- Class: Insecta
- Order: Lepidoptera
- Superfamily: Noctuoidea
- Family: Erebidae
- Subfamily: Herminiinae
- Genus: Machaeropalpus; Tams, 1935
- Species: M. fasciatus

Binomial name
- Machaeropalpus fasciatus Tams, 1935

Genus of moths

Machaeropalpus is a monotypic moth genus of the family Erebidae. Its only species, Machaeropalpus fasciatus, is found in Samoa. Both the genus and species were first described by Tams in 1935.
