= Micrantha (moth) =

Scientific classification
- Kingdom: Animalia
- Phylum: Arthropoda
- Class: Insecta
- Order: Lepidoptera
- Superfamily: Noctuoidea
- Family: Noctuidae
- Subfamily: Acontiinae
- Genus: Micrantha; Hampson, 1910

Genus of moths

Micrantha is a genus of moths of the family Noctuidae. The genus was erected by George Hampson in 1910.

== Species ==
- Micrantha cyclopis Hampson, 1910 Panama
- Micrantha janeira (Schaus, 1904) Brazil (Rio de Janeiro)
- Micrantha mirabilis (Schaus, 1904) Brazil (São Paulo)
- Micrantha mollita Schaus, 1911 Costa Rica
