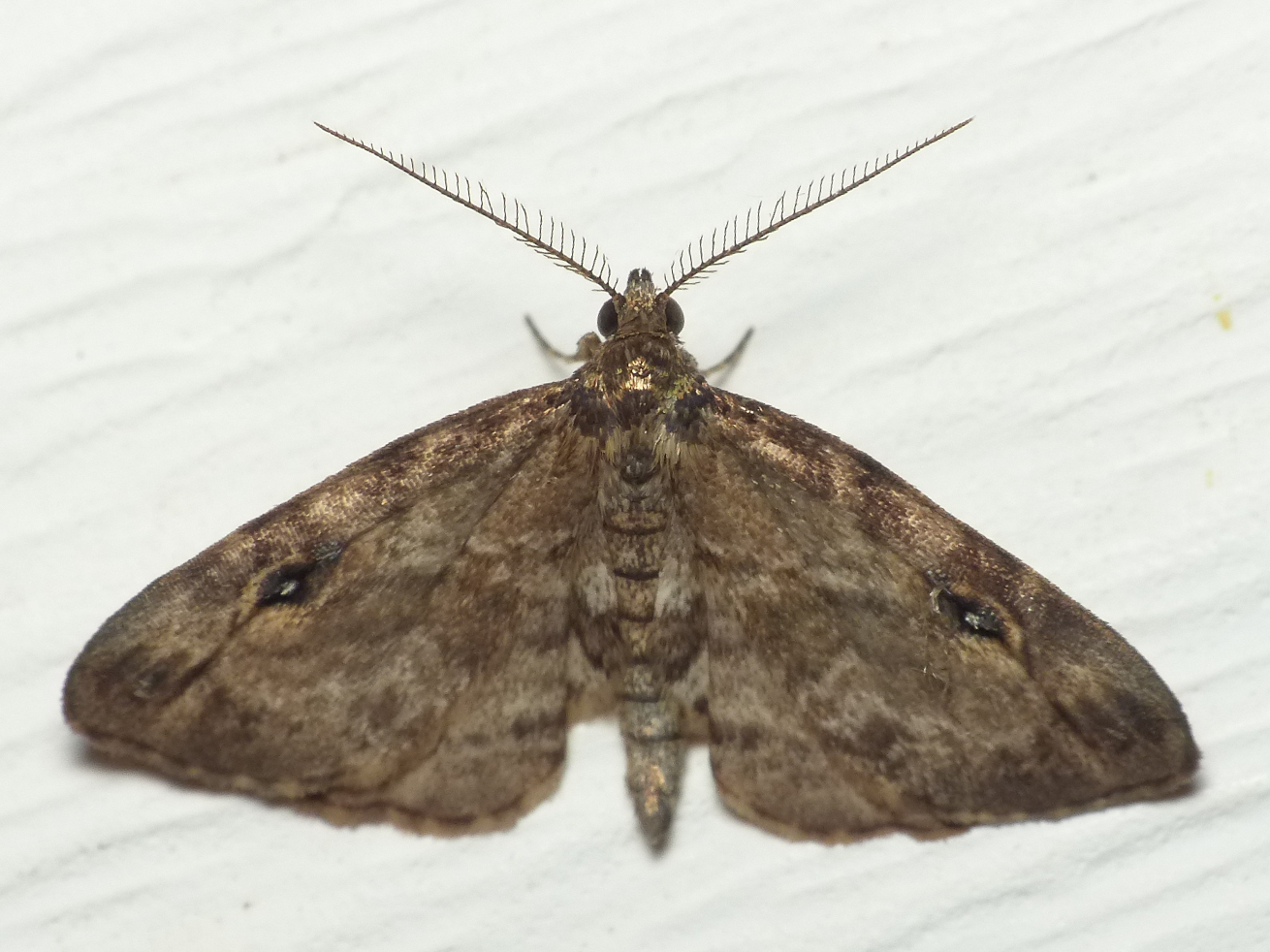

Scientific classification
- Kingdom: Animalia
- Phylum: Arthropoda
- Class: Insecta
- Order: Lepidoptera
- Superfamily: Noctuoidea
- Family: Erebidae
- Genus: Melanomma; Grote, 1875
- Species: M. auricinctaria

Binomial name
- Melanomma auricinctaria Grote, 1875

= Melanomma auricinctaria =

Species of moth

Melanomma auricinctaria, the gold-lined melanomma moth, is the only species in the monotypic genus of moths Melanomma in the family Erebidae. It is found in the United States and Canada. Both the genus and species were first described by Augustus Radcliffe Grote in 1875.
