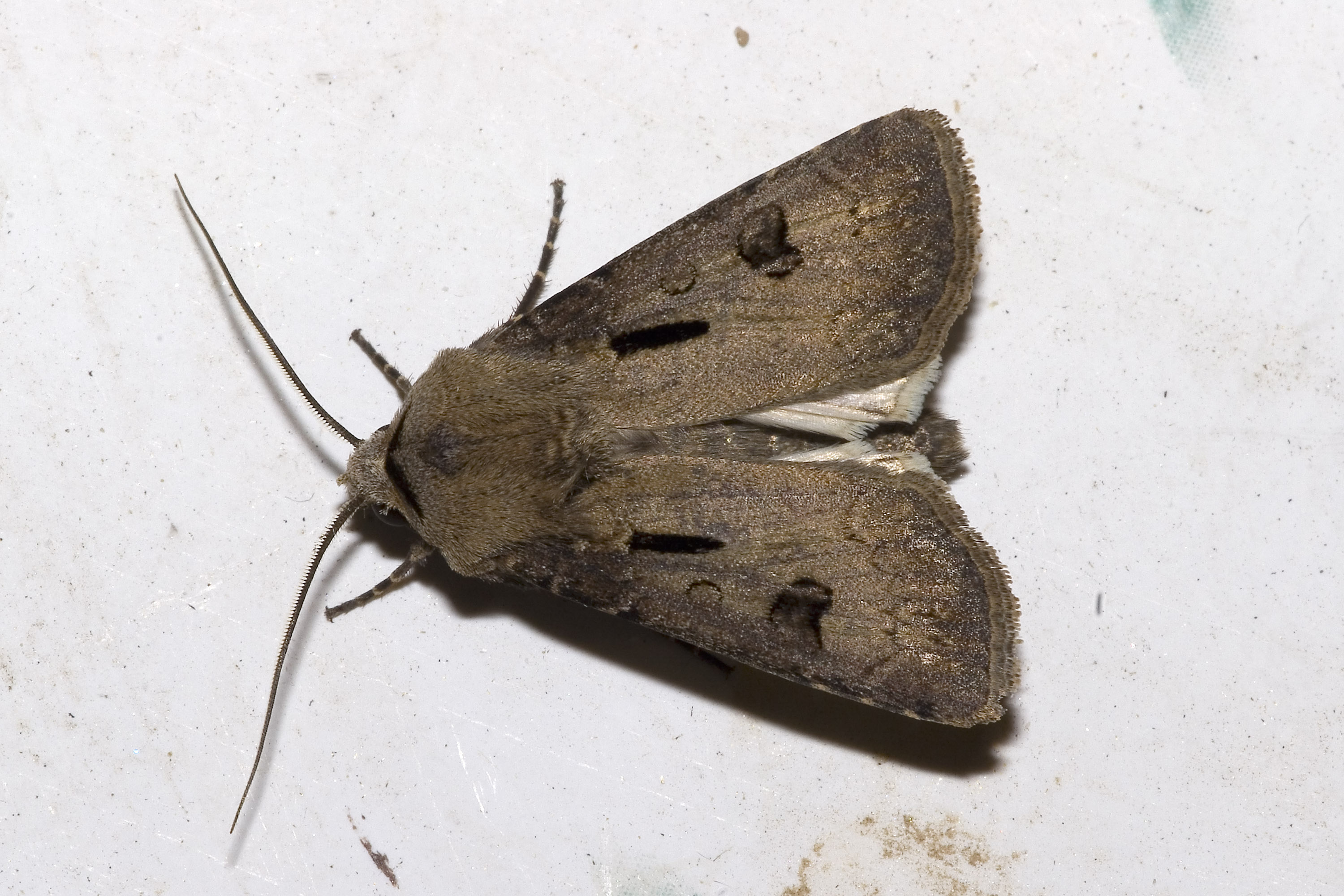
- Heart and dart (Agrotis exclamationis) moth

Scientific classification
- Kingdom: Animalia
- Phylum: Arthropoda
- Clade: Pancrustacea
- Class: Insecta
- Order: Lepidoptera
- Superfamily: Noctuoidea
- Family: Noctuidae
- Subfamily: Noctuinae

Tribes
- Actinotiini Beck, 1996; Apameini Guenée, 1841; Arzamini Grote, 1883; Caradrinini Boisduval, 1840; Dypterygiini Forbes, 1954; Elaphriini Beck, 1996; Episemini Guenée, 1852; Eriopygini Fibiger & Lafontaine, 2005; Glottulini Guenée, 1852; Hadenini Guenée, 1837; Leucaniini Guenée, 1837; Noctuini Latreille, 1809; Orthosiini Guenée, 1837; Phlogophorini Hampson, 1918; Phosphilini Poole, 1995; Prodeniini Forbes, 1954; Pseudeustrotiini Beck, 1996; Tholerini Beck, 1996; Xylenini Guenée, 1837

Diversity
- at least 600 genera

= Noctuinae =

Subfamily of moths

The Noctuinae are a subfamily of the family Noctuidae moths. The larva are often referred to as "cutworms" or “armyworms”. The larvae of many species feed on roots or stems of various grasses. Some are generalist feeders which makes them potential pests.

Noctuid systematics is in a state of flux; the list of tribes is provisional and other groups now considered more distinct. For example, Hadeninae were formerly included in this family. Likewise, the validity of the tribe Xestiini is in question.

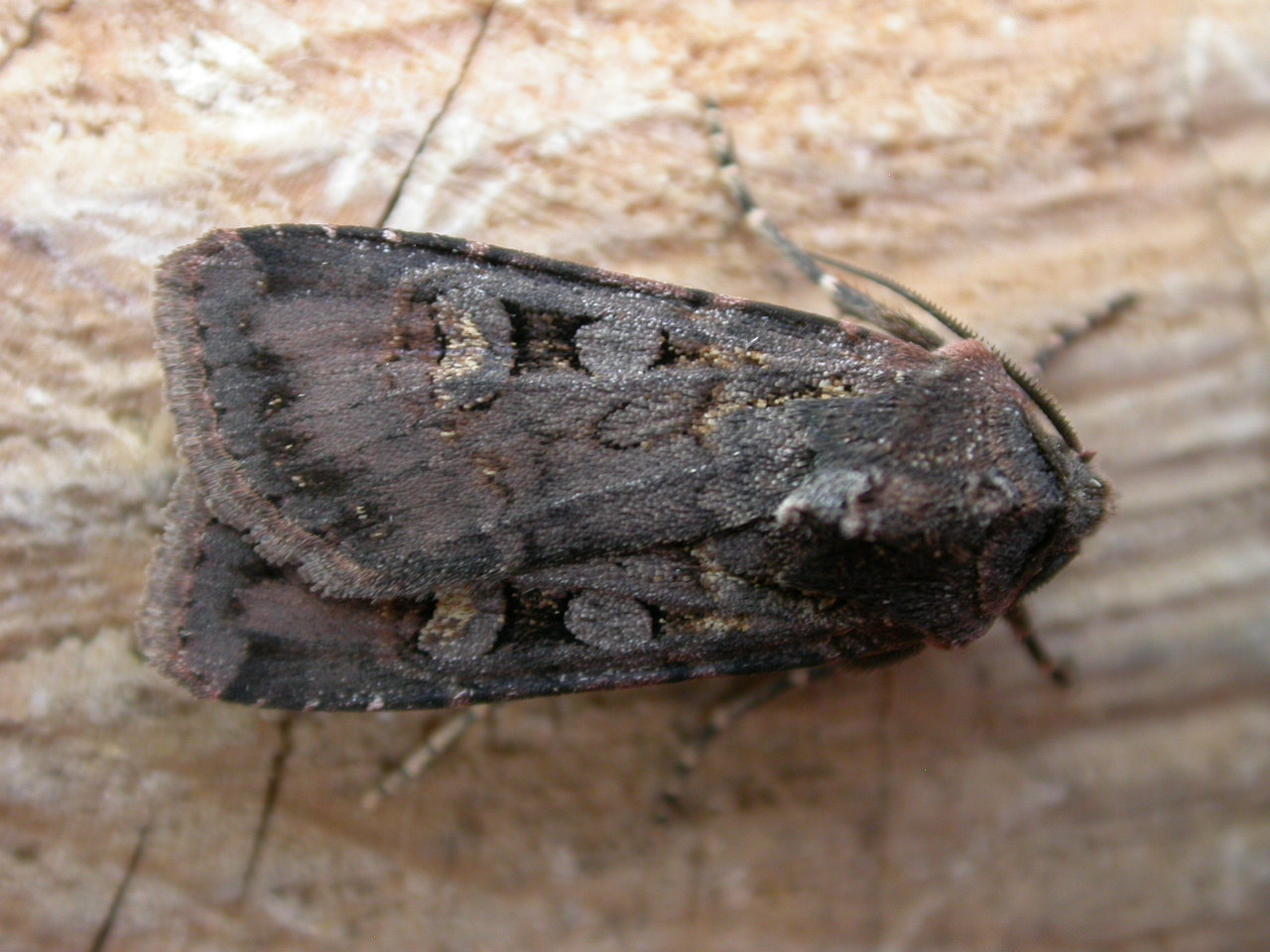
Garden dart (Euxoa nigricans) imago

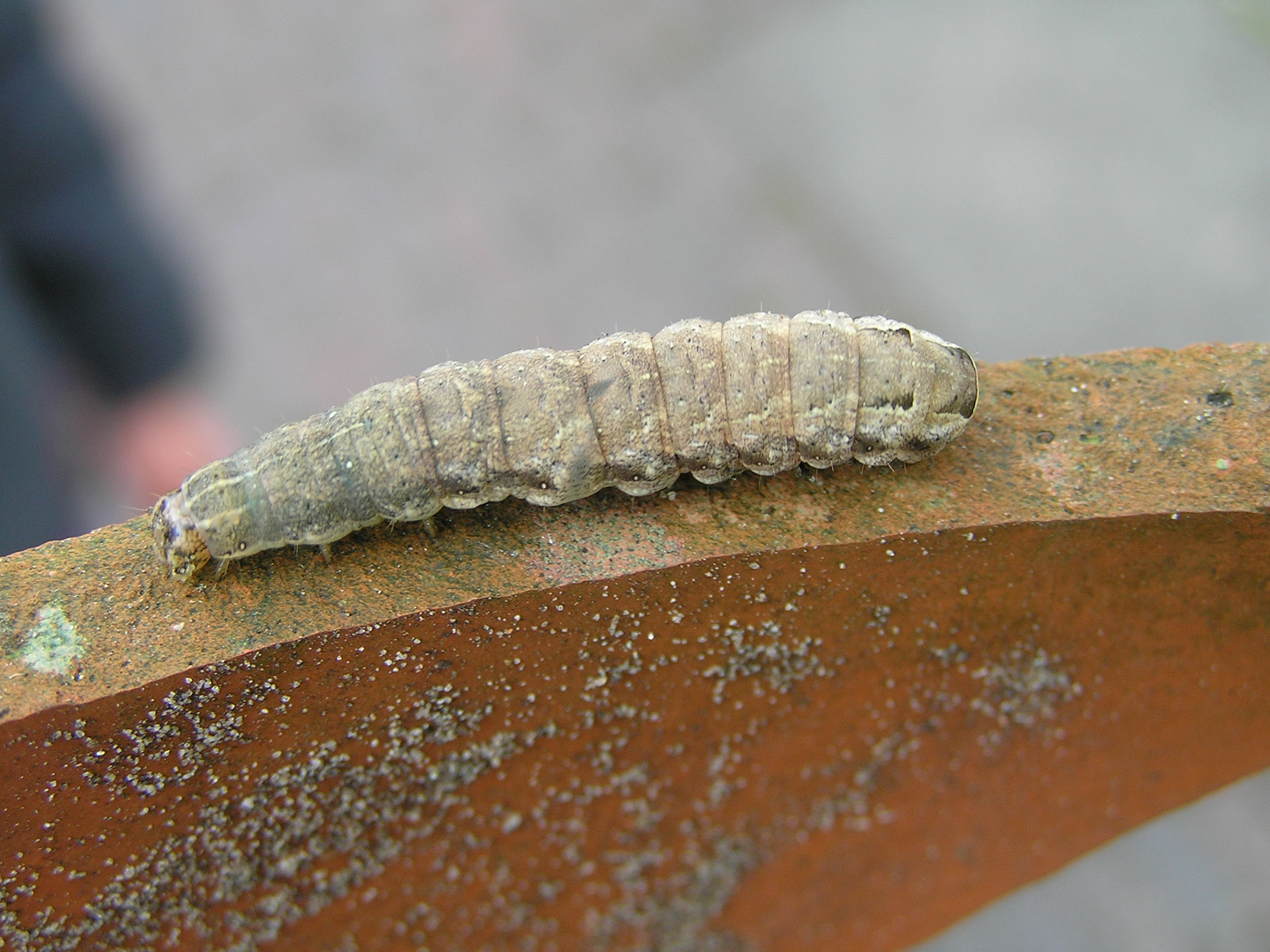
Double square-spot (Xestia triangulum) caterpillar

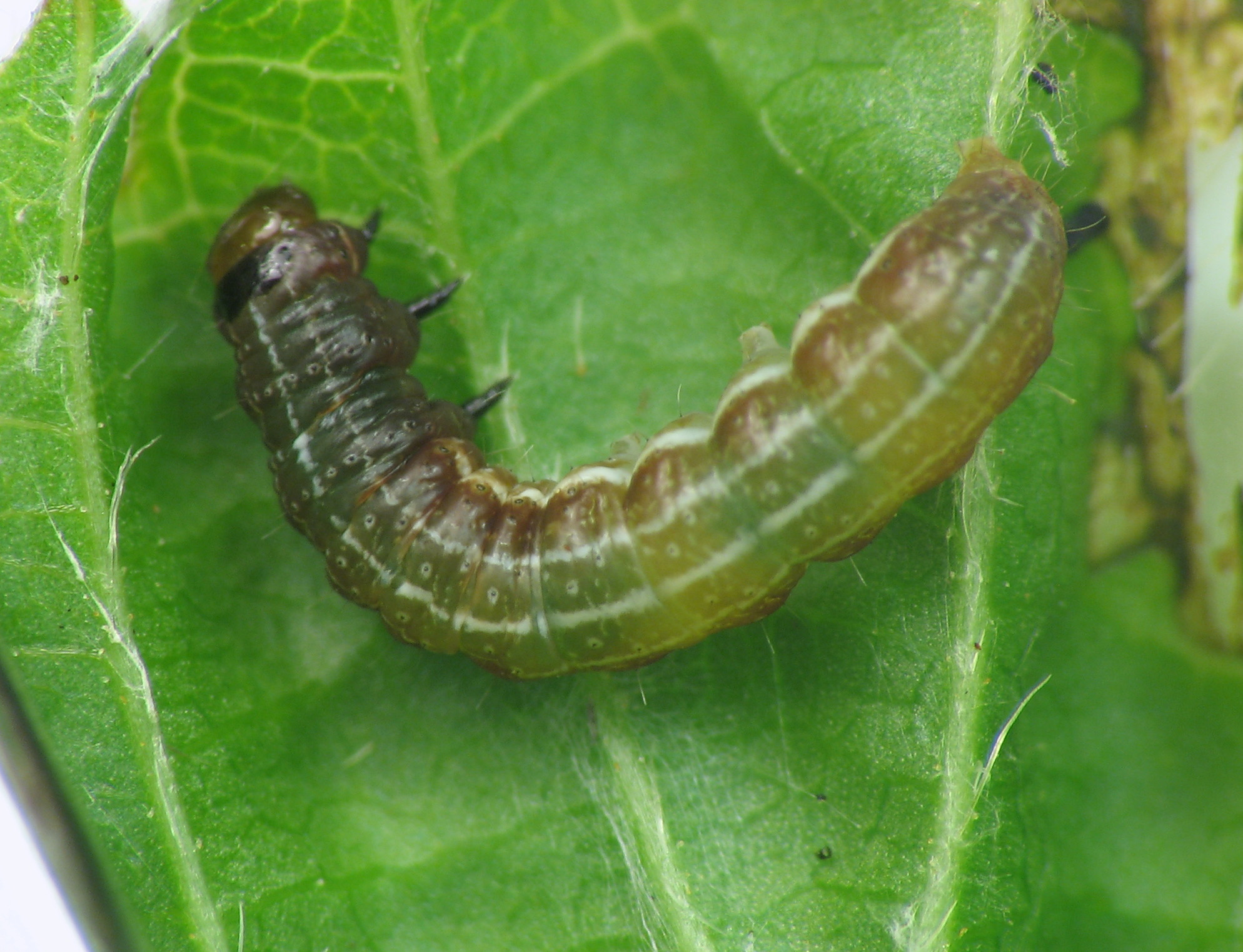
Eupsilia sp., early instar caterpillar

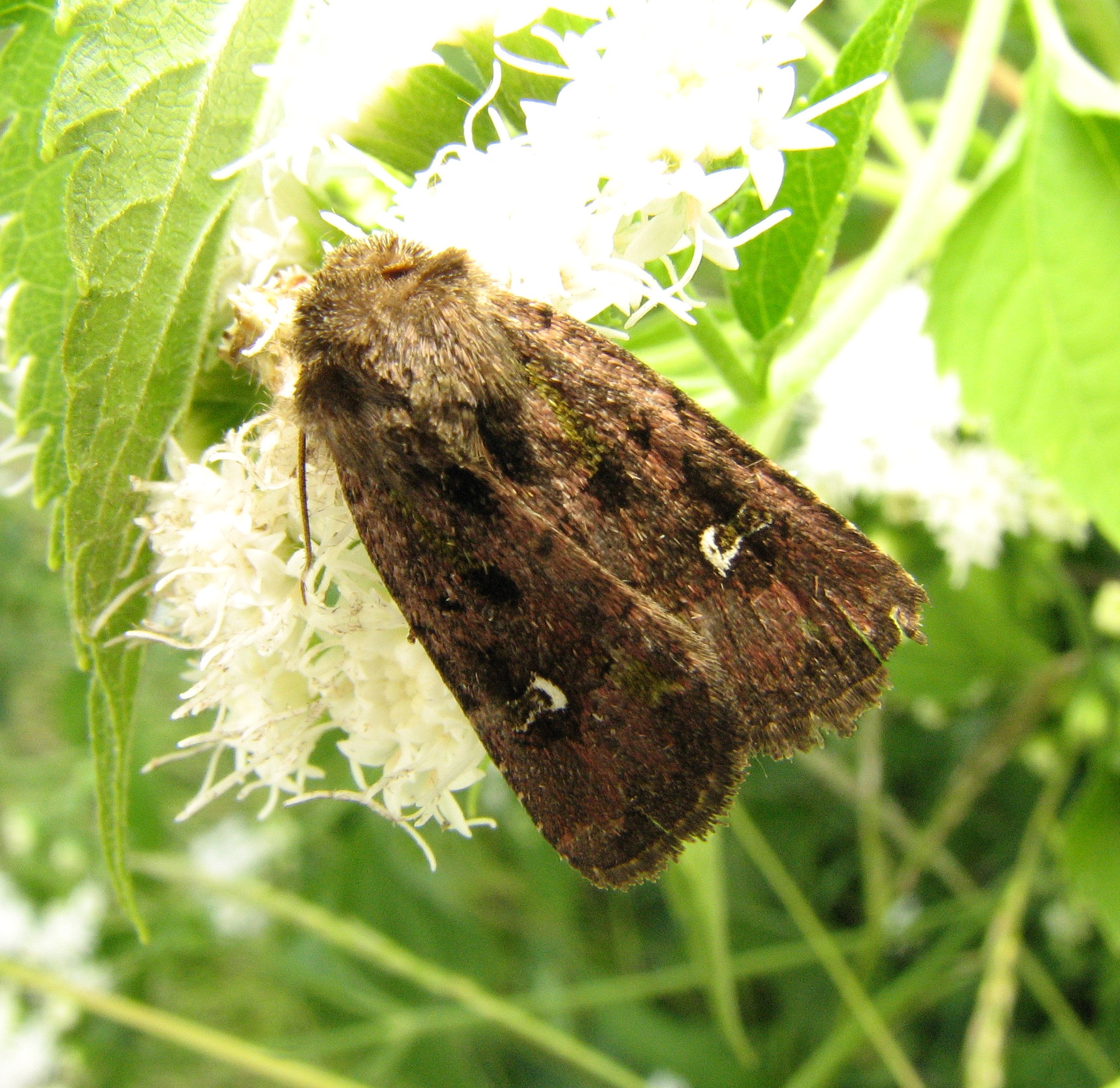
Lacinipolia renigera

== See also ==
- List of Noctuinae genera
