= List of noctuid genera: H =

The huge moth family Noctuidae contains the following genera:

A B C D E F G H I J K L M N O P Q R S T U V W X Y Z

- Habershonia
- Habrophyes
- Habrostolodes
- Habryntis
- Hada
- Hadena
- Hadenella
- Hadennia
- Haderonia
- Haderonidis
- Hadjina
- Hadula
- Hadulipolia
- Haemabasis
- Haemachola
- Haemaphlebia
- Haematosticta
- Haemerosia
- Hakkaria
- Halastus
- Haliophyle
- Halochroa
- Hamodes
- Hampsonidia
- Hampsonodes
- Hapalotis
- Hapda
- Haplocestra
- Haploolophus
- Haplopseustis
- Haplostola
- Harita
- Haritalopha
- Harpaglaea
- Harpagophana
- Harrisimemna
- Harutaeographa
- Harveya
- Hebdomochondra
- Hecatera
- Hecatesia
- Hedymiges
- Helia
- Helicoverpa
- Heliocheilus
- Heliocontia
- Heliodes
- Heliodora
- Heliolonche
- Helionycta
- Heliophana
- Heliophisma
- Heliophobus
- Helioscota
- Heliosea
- Heliothis
- Heliothodes
- Helivictoria
- Helotropha
- Hemeroblemma
- Hemeroplanis
- Hemibryomima
- Hemicephalis
- Hemiceratoides
- Hemichloridia
- Hemictenophora
- Hemieuxoa
- Hemiexarnis
- Hemigeometra
- Hemiglaea
- Hemigraphiphora
- Hemigrotella
- Heminocloa
- Hemioslaria
- Hemipachnobia
- Hemipachycera
- Hemipsectra
- Hemispragueia
- Hemistilbia
- Hemituerta
- Heoeugorna
- Hepatica
- Hepsidera
- Heptagrotis
- Heptapotamia
- Heraclia
- Heraema
- Herchunda
- Herminia
- Herminiocala
- Herminodes
- Hermonassa
- Hermonassoides
- Herpeperas
- Herpoperasa
- Hespagarista
- Hesperimorpha
- Hesperochroa
- Heteranassa
- Heterandra
- Heterochroma
- Heterocryphia
- Heterodelta
- Heteroeuxoa
- Heterogramma
- Heterographa
- Heteromala
- Heterommiola
- Heteropalpia
- Heterophysa
- Heteropygas
- Heterormista
- Heterorta
- Heteroscotia
- Heterospila
- Hexamitoptera
- Hexaureia
- Hexorthodes
- Hiaspis
- Hiccoda
- Hileia
- Hillia
- Himachalia
- Himalistra
- Himerois
- Hingula
- Hipoepa
- Hirsutipes
- Hirsutopalpis
- Hoeneidia
- Hollandia
- Holocryptis
- Holoxanthina
- Homaea
- Homoanartha
- Homocerynea
- Homodes
- Homodina
- Homoglaea
- Homohadena
- Homolagoa
- Homonacna
- Homococnemis
- Homophoberia
- Homopyralis
- Homorthodes
- Hondryches
- Honeyania
- Hopetounia
- Hoplarista
- Hoplodrina
- Hoplolythra
- Hoplolythrodes
- Hoplotarache
- Hoplotarsia
- Hopothia
- Hormisa
- Hormoschista
- Hortonius
- Huebnerius
- Hulodes
- Hulypegis
- Humichola
- Hurworthia
- Hyada
- Hyalobole
- Hyamia
- Hyboma
- Hydraecia
- Hydrillodes
- Hydrillula
- Hydroeciodes
- Hyelopsis
- Hygrostola
- Hygrostolides
- Hylonycta
- Hymenocryphia
- Hymenodrina
- Hypaenistis
- Hypangitia
- Hypanua
- Hypena
- Hypenagonia
- Hypenagoniodes
- Hypenarana
- Hypendalia
- Hypenodes
- Hypenomorpha
- Hypenopsis
- Hypenula
- Hyperaucha
- Hyperbaniana
- Hypercalymnia
- Hypercodia
- Hyperdasys
- Hyperepia
- Hyperfrontia
- Hyperlopha
- Hyperlophoides
- Hypermilichia
- Hypernaenia
- Hypersophtha
- Hyperstrotia
- Hypersypnoides
- Hypertrocon
- Hypertrocta
- Hypeuthina
- Hyphilare
- Hypnotype
- Hypobarathra
- Hypobleta
- Hypocala
- Hypocalamia
- Hypocalpe
- Hypocoena
- Hypoechana
- Hypoglaucitis
- Hypogramma
- Hypogrammodes
- Hypomecia
- Hyponeuma
- Hypoperigea
- Hypopleurona
- Hypoplexia
- Hypoprora
- Hypopteridia
- Hypopyra
- Hyposada
- Hyposemansis
- Hyposemeia
- Hypospila
- Hypostilbia
- Hypostrotia
- Hyposypnoides
- Hypotacha
- Hypotrisula
- Hypotrix
- Hypotuerta
- Hypotype
- Hypoxestia
- Hyppa
- Hypsa
- Hypsiforma
- Hypsophila
- Hypsoropha
- Hyptioxesta
- Hyrcanypena
- Hyriodes
- Hyssia
