= H. gouldii =

H. gouldii may refer to:

- Hapalotis gouldii, a moth species in the genus Hapalotis
- Heintzichthys gouldii, an extinct placoderm fish species that lived what is now Europe and North America during the Late Devonian
- Hydrosaurus gouldii, a sailfin lizard species in the genus Hydrosaurus

== See also ==
- Gouldii (disambiguation)
