= Heliolonche joaquinensis =

Scientific classification
- Domain: Eukaryota
- Kingdom: Animalia
- Phylum: Arthropoda
- Class: Insecta
- Order: Lepidoptera
- Superfamily: Noctuoidea
- Family: Noctuidae
- Genus: Heliolonche
- Species: H. joaquinensis

Binomial name
- Heliolonche joaquinensis Hardwick, 1996

Species of moth

Heliolonche joaquinensis is a species of moth of the family Noctuidae. It is found in the San Joaquin Valley from San Benito and Fresno counties in the north and Kern and Santa Barbara counties in the south.

The length of the forewings is 8.5–9 mm for males and 8–9 mm for females. Adults are on wing from March to May.
