= Heliolonche modicella =

Scientific classification
- Domain: Eukaryota
- Kingdom: Animalia
- Phylum: Arthropoda
- Class: Insecta
- Order: Lepidoptera
- Superfamily: Noctuoidea
- Family: Noctuidae
- Genus: Heliolonche
- Species: H. modicella

Binomial name
- Heliolonche modicella Grotte, 1873

Species of moth

Heliolonche modicella is a species of moth of the family Noctuidae. It is found in North America, including California.

The wingspan is about 18 mm. The adults are day-flying.
