= Hypobleta =

Scientific classification
- Domain: Eukaryota
- Kingdom: Animalia
- Phylum: Arthropoda
- Class: Insecta
- Order: Lepidoptera
- Superfamily: Noctuoidea
- Family: Noctuidae
- Subfamily: Acontiinae
- Genus: Hypobleta; Turner, 1908

Genus of moths

Hypobleta is a genus of moths of the family Noctuidae described by Turner in 1908.

== Species ==
- Hypobleta cymaea Turner, 1908
- Hypobleta fatua Viette, 1961
- Hypobleta festiva Viette, 1961
- Hypobleta viettei Berio, 1954

Lepidoptera and Some Other Life Forms gives this name as a synonym of Obana Walker, 1862.
