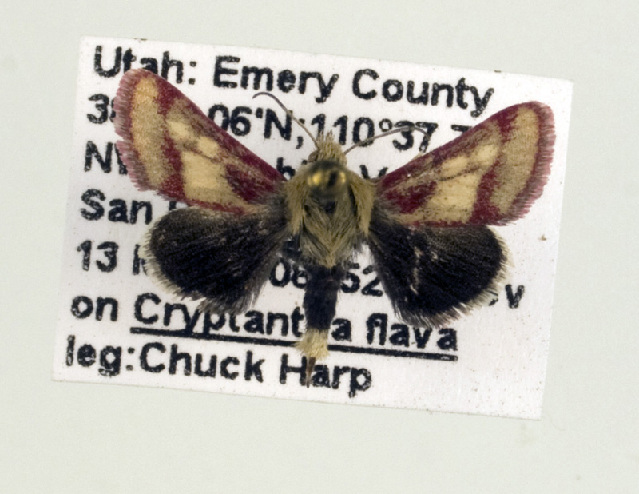

Scientific classification
- Kingdom: Animalia
- Phylum: Arthropoda
- Class: Insecta
- Order: Lepidoptera
- Superfamily: Noctuoidea
- Family: Noctuidae
- Genus: Heliolonche
- Species: H. pictipennis

Binomial name
- Heliolonche pictipennis (Grotte, 1875)

Synonyms
- Heliosea pictipennis Grote, 1875; Heliolonche defasciata (Benjamin, 1936); Heliolonche cresina (Smith, 1906); Melicleptria cresina Smith, 1906

= Heliolonche pictipennis =

Species of moth

Heliolonche pictipennis is a species of moth of the family Noctuidae. It is found in North America, including California and Arizona.

The wingspan is 16–17 mm.

The larvae feed on Malacothrix glabrata and Rafinesquia neomexicana.

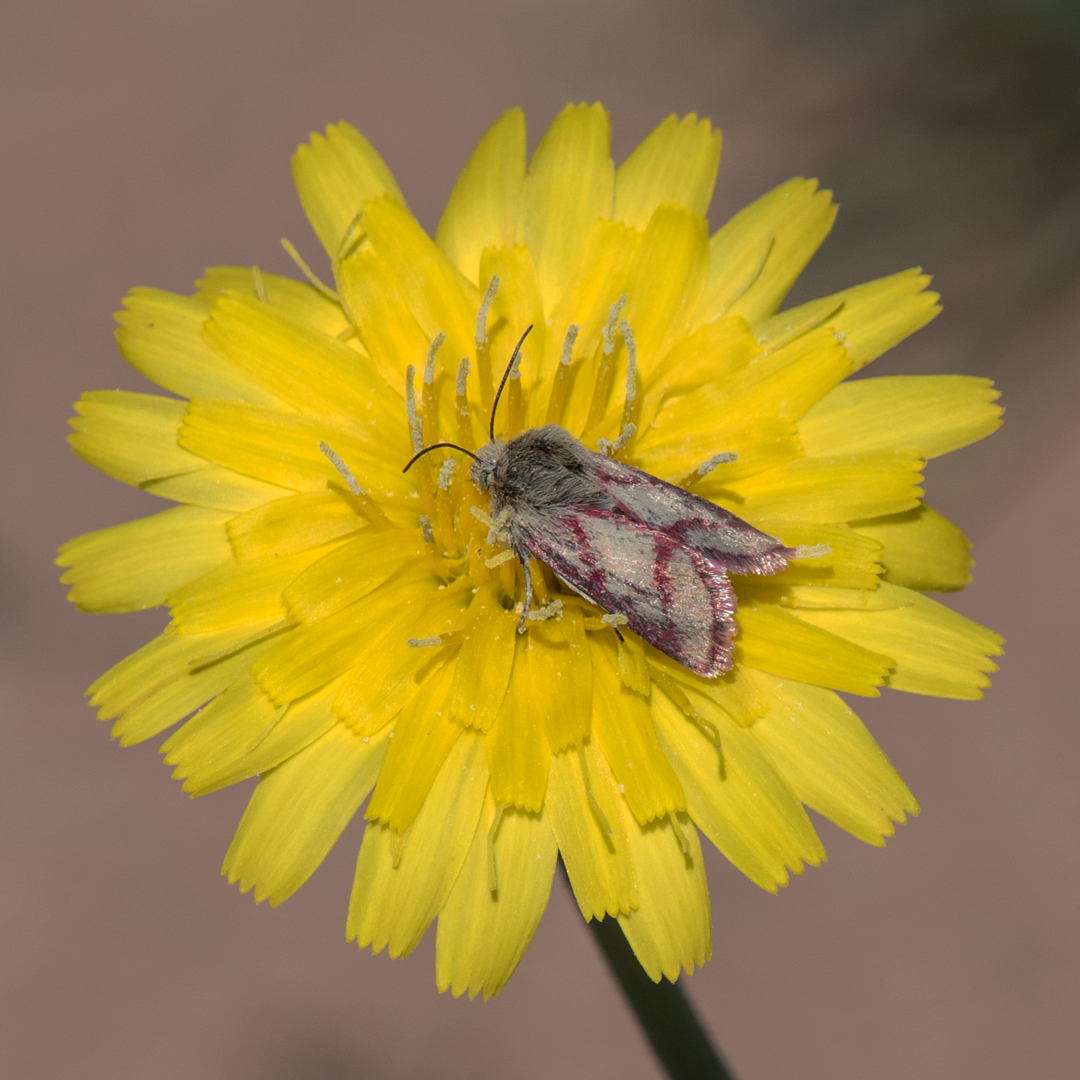
Heliolonche pictipennis on desert dandelion, Malacothrix fendleri
