= Hyperlopha cristifera =

Scientific classification
- Kingdom: Animalia
- Phylum: Arthropoda
- Clade: Pancrustacea
- Class: Insecta
- Order: Lepidoptera
- Superfamily: Noctuoidea
- Family: Erebidae
- Subfamily: Calpinae
- Genus: Hyperlopha
- Species: H. cristifera

Binomial name
- Hyperlopha cristifera (Walker, 1863)

Synonyms
- Ephyrodes cristifera Walker, 1863; Catada epops Felder & Rogenhofer, 1874; Zethes irrorata Hampson, 1893; Hyperlopha orientalis Hulstaert, 1924

Species of moth

Hyperlopha cristifera is a moth of the family Noctuidae first described by Francis Walker in 1863. It is found in Sri Lanka, Laos, Malaysia and Australia. Adult wings are pale brown, sometimes with a number of dark dots near the tornus of each forewing. Forewings with a hooked wingtip, and a cusp on the margin can be found.

Two subspecies are recognized including the nominate race.

- Hyperlopha cristifera cristifera Walker, 1863
- Hyperlopha cristifera orientalis Hulstaert, 1924
