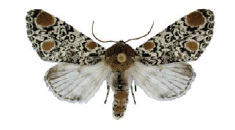

Scientific classification
- Kingdom: Animalia
- Phylum: Arthropoda
- Clade: Pancrustacea
- Class: Insecta
- Order: Lepidoptera
- Superfamily: Noctuoidea
- Family: Noctuidae
- Genus: Harrisimemna
- Species: H. trisignata

Binomial name
- Harrisimemna trisignata (Walker, 1856)

Synonyms
- Harrisimemna sexguttata (Harris, 1869)

= Harrisimemna trisignata =

Harris's three spot

Species of moth

Harrisimemna trisignata, or Harris's three spot, is a moth of the family Noctuidae. The species was first described by Francis Walker in 1856. It is found in North America from Ontario, Quebec, New Brunswick, Nova Scotia, Newfoundland and Labrador, Alberta and Saskatchewan, south to Arizona. In the United States it has been recorded in Maryland, Pennsylvania, Wisconsin, Georgia, Illinois, Indiana, Iowa, New York, Ohio, Oklahoma, Tennessee, Texas and Virginia.

The wingspan is 30–36 mm. Adults are on wing from May to August in Canada.

The larvae feed on various woody plants, including wild raisin, winterberry, bush honeysuckle, black willow, white ash and apple.

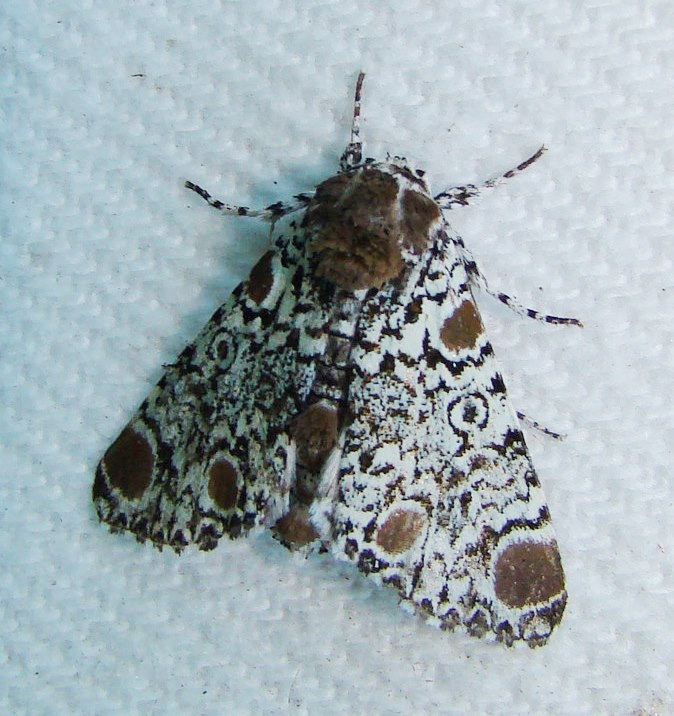
