= Hadennia mysalis =

Scientific classification
- Kingdom: Animalia
- Phylum: Arthropoda
- Clade: Pancrustacea
- Class: Insecta
- Order: Lepidoptera
- Superfamily: Noctuoidea
- Family: Erebidae
- Genus: Hadennia
- Species: H. mysalis

Binomial name
- Hadennia mysalis (Walker, 1859)

Synonyms
- Bertula mysalis Walker, 1859; Hadennia mysalis Walker, 1859; Bertula albinotalis Moore, 1877; Hadennia purnosa Moore, [1885]; Hadennia ignicoma Swinhoe, 1890; Hadennia palpiplumalis M. Owada, 1987

Species of moth

Hadennia mysalis is a moth of the family Noctuidae first described by Francis Walker in 1859. It is found in Sri Lanka, Japan, Taiwan, Thailand, Borneo, Myanmar and the Andaman Islands.

Diffuse dark brown-and-mauve banding runs across both forewings and hindwings. Pale yellow discal spots characteristic on the pale mauve band. This band is oblique in forewings. Discal spot is broader, slightly doubled and slightly yellowish. There is an irregular, punctate, white submarginal fascia. Labial palpi upcurved.
