= Haliophyle flavistigma =

Scientific classification
- Kingdom: Animalia
- Phylum: Arthropoda
- Clade: Pancrustacea
- Class: Insecta
- Order: Lepidoptera
- Superfamily: Noctuoidea
- Family: Noctuidae
- Genus: Haliophyle
- Species: H. flavistigma

Binomial name
- Haliophyle flavistigma (Warren, 1912)

Synonyms
- Eriopygodes euclidias ab. 3 Hampson, 1905; Haliophyle euclidias ab. flavistigma Warren, 1912; Eriopygodes euclidias ab. 2 Hampson, 1905; Eriopygodes euclidias ab. depupillata Strand, 1916

Species of moth

Haliophyle flavistigma is a moth of the family Noctuidae. It was first described by William Warren in 1912. It is endemic to the Hawaiian island of Maui.
