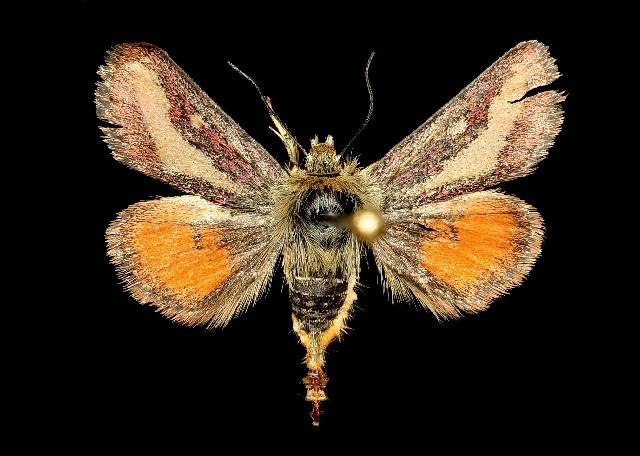

Scientific classification
- Domain: Eukaryota
- Kingdom: Animalia
- Phylum: Arthropoda
- Class: Insecta
- Order: Lepidoptera
- Superfamily: Noctuoidea
- Family: Noctuidae
- Genus: Heliolonche
- Species: H. carolus

Binomial name
- Heliolonche carolus McDunnough, 1936

= Heliolonche carolus =

Species of moth

Heliolonche carolus is a species of moth of the family Noctuidae. It is found in North America, including California and Arizona.
