= Hypenagonia vexataria =

Scientific classification
- Kingdom: Animalia
- Phylum: Arthropoda
- Class: Insecta
- Order: Lepidoptera
- Superfamily: Noctuoidea
- Family: Erebidae
- Genus: Hypenagonia
- Species: H. vexataria

Binomial name
- Hypenagonia vexataria (Walker, 1861)

Synonyms
- Acidalia vexataria Walker, 1861

Species of moth

Hypenagonia vexataria is a moth of the family Erebidae first described by Francis Walker in 1861. It is found in Borneo and probably in Sri Lanka,
