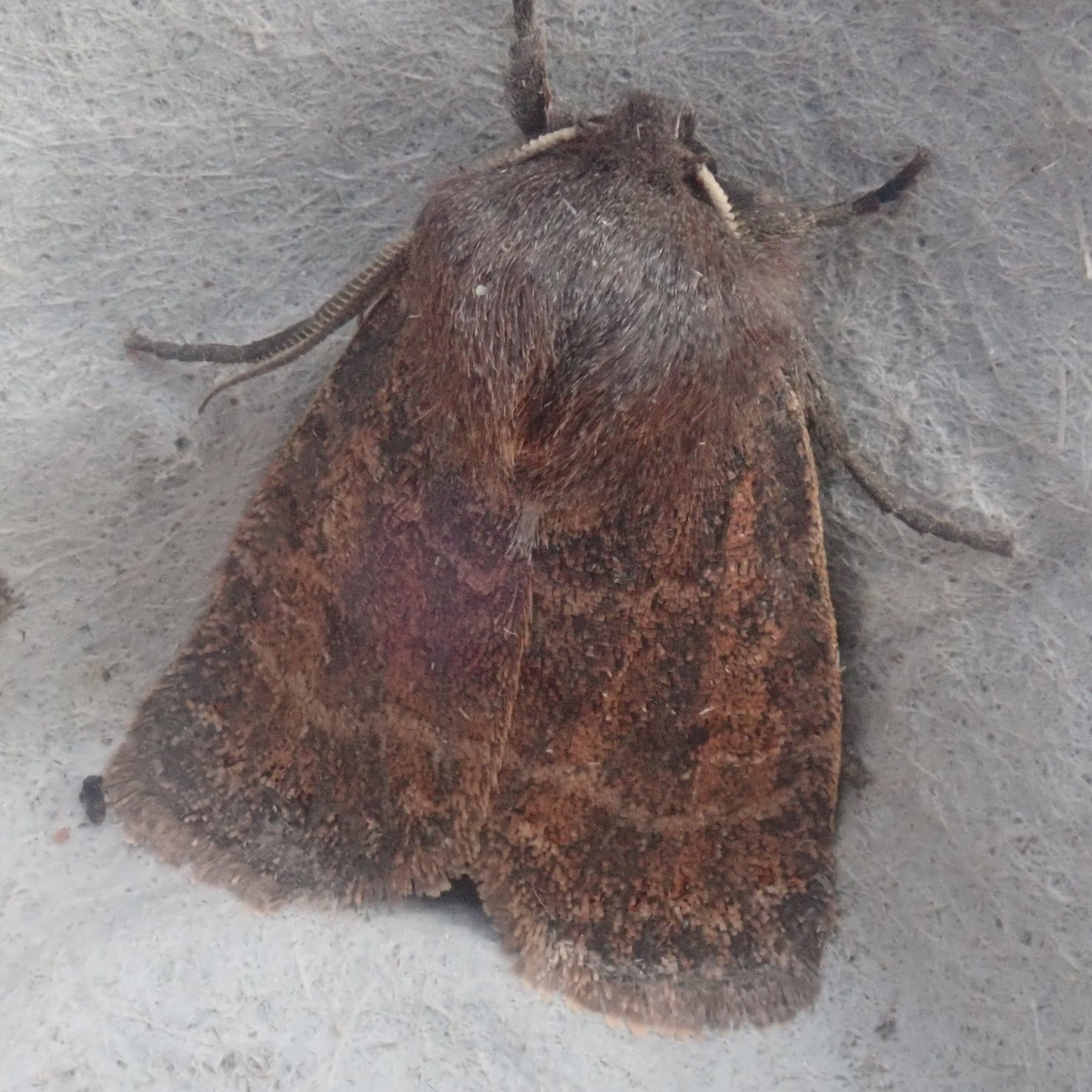

Scientific classification
- Domain: Eukaryota
- Kingdom: Animalia
- Phylum: Arthropoda
- Class: Insecta
- Order: Lepidoptera
- Superfamily: Noctuoidea
- Family: Noctuidae
- Tribe: Xylenini
- Subtribe: Xylenina
- Genus: Homoglaea
- Species: H. hircina

Binomial name
- Homoglaea hircina Morrison, 1876

= Homoglaea hircina =

Species of moth

Homoglaea hircina, commonly known as the goat sallow, is a species of cutworm or dart moth in the family Noctuidae. It is found in North America.
