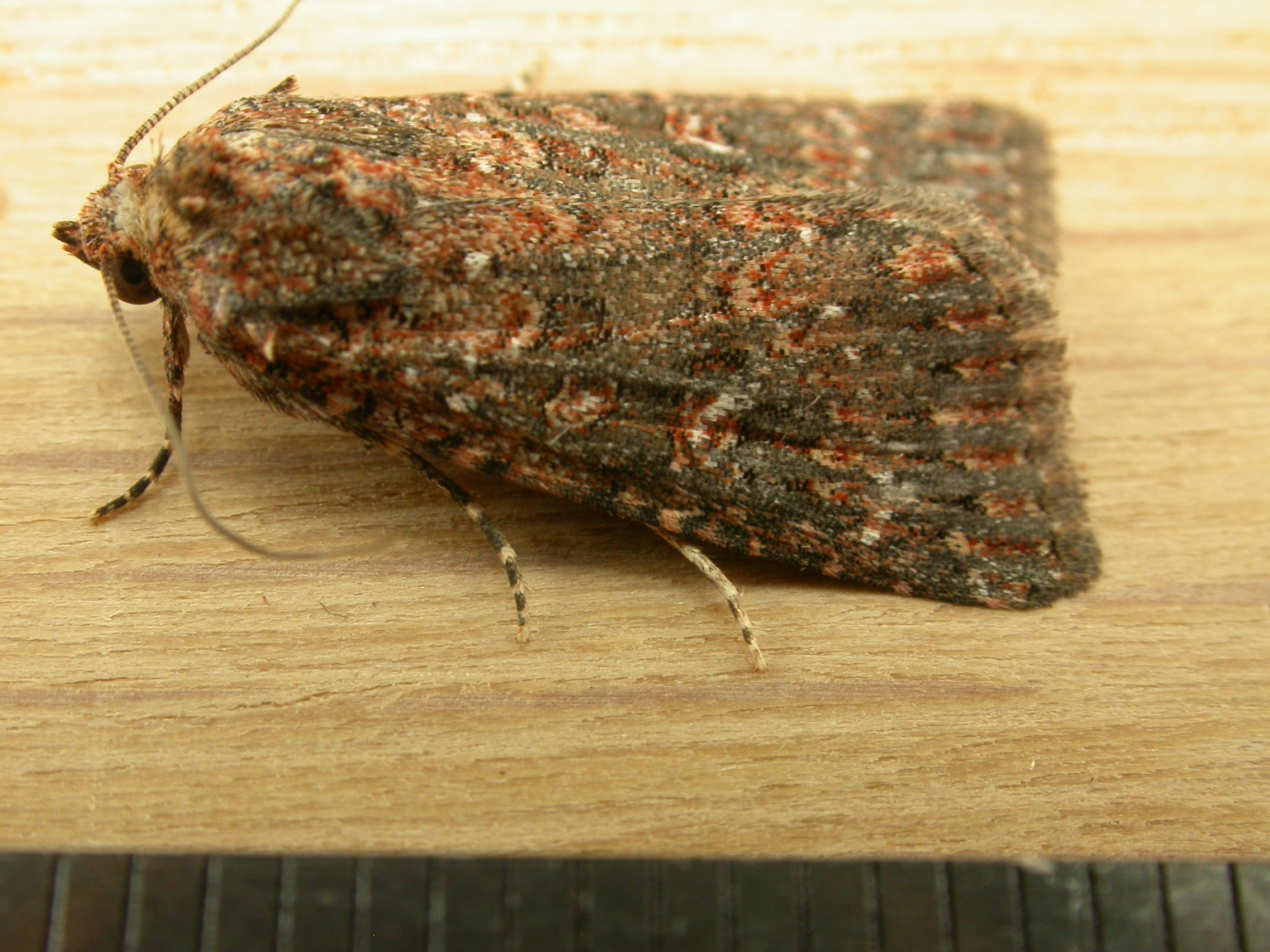

Scientific classification
- Kingdom: Animalia
- Phylum: Arthropoda
- Clade: Pancrustacea
- Class: Insecta
- Order: Lepidoptera
- Superfamily: Noctuoidea
- Family: Noctuidae
- Genus: Hypoperigea
- Species: H. tonsa

Binomial name
- Hypoperigea tonsa (Guenée, 1852)

Synonyms
- Perigea tonsa Guenée, 1852; Prometopus rubrispersa Turner, 1904; Prospalta pulverosa Warren, 1912; Prospalta pulverosa Warren, 1937

= Hypoperigea tonsa =

Species of moth

Hypoperigea tonsa is a moth species of the family Noctuidae. It is found in all of mainland Australia and Norfolk Island.
