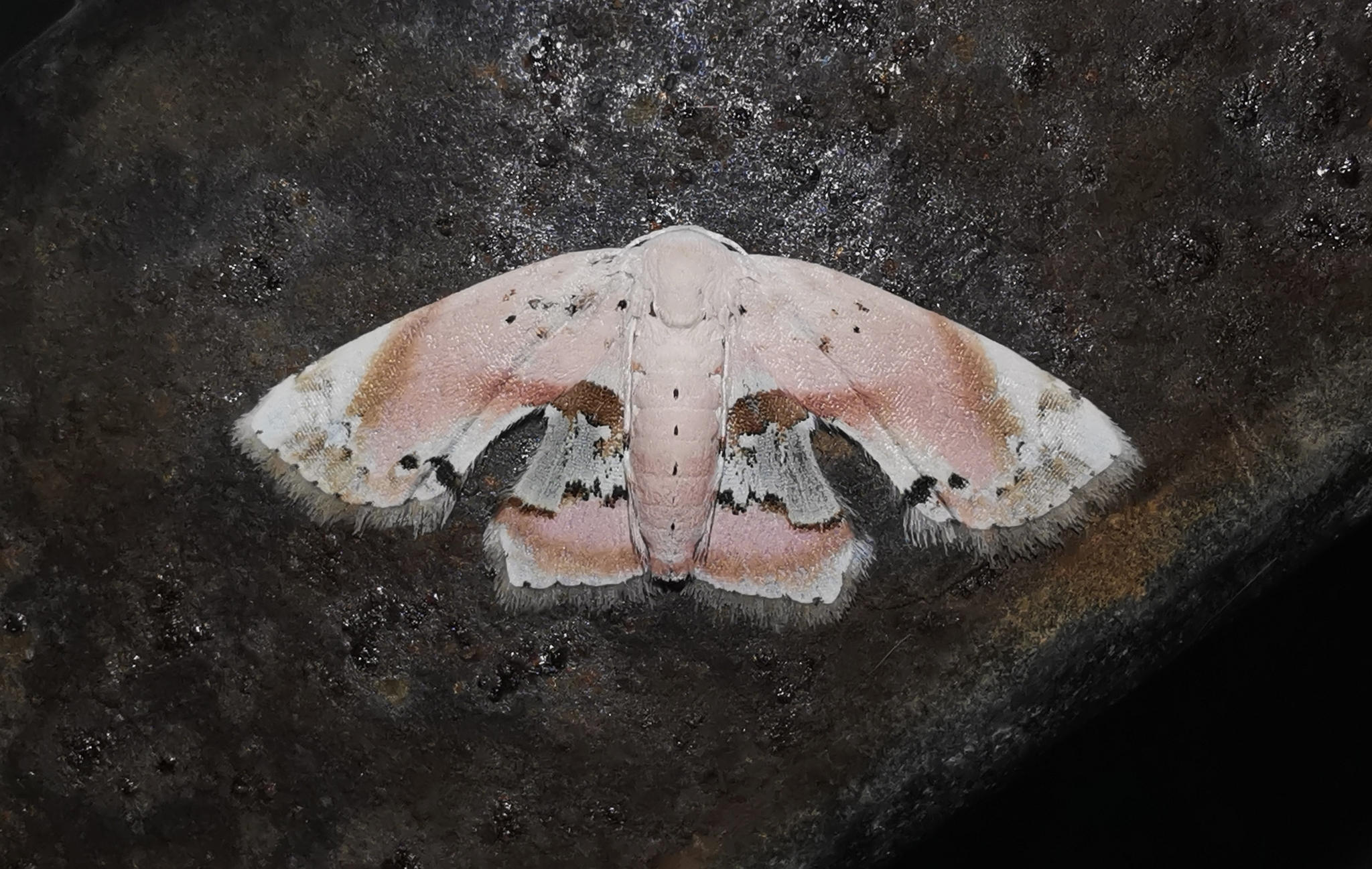

Scientific classification
- Kingdom: Animalia
- Phylum: Arthropoda
- Class: Insecta
- Order: Lepidoptera
- Superfamily: Noctuoidea
- Family: Noctuidae
- Genus: Holocryptis
- Species: H. erubescens

Binomial name
- Holocryptis erubescens Hampson, 1893

= Holocryptis erubescens =

Species of moth

Holocryptis erubescens is a moth of the family Noctuidae first described by George Hampson in 1893. It is found in Sri Lanka, Thailand and Japan.

Forewings brownish. There is a light yellow-brown oblique streak which runs from the center of the leading edge to the outer edge. Small black spots are present near the trailing edge angle.
