= Homoanarta falcata =

Scientific classification
- Domain: Eukaryota
- Kingdom: Animalia
- Phylum: Arthropoda
- Class: Insecta
- Order: Lepidoptera
- Superfamily: Noctuoidea
- Family: Noctuidae
- Genus: Homoanarta
- Species: H. falcata

Binomial name
- Homoanarta falcata (Neumoegen, 1884)

Synonyms
- Pseudanarta falcata

Species of moth

Homoanarta falcata is a moth of the family Noctuidae. It is found in North America, including Texas, Utah and Arizona.
