= Hypenagonia flavisigna =

Scientific classification
- Kingdom: Animalia
- Phylum: Arthropoda
- Class: Insecta
- Order: Lepidoptera
- Superfamily: Noctuoidea
- Family: Erebidae
- Genus: Hypenagonia
- Species: H. flavisigna

Binomial name
- Hypenagonia flavisigna Hampson, 1912

Species of moth

Hypenagonia flavisigna is a moth of the family Noctuidae first described by George Hampson in 1912. It is found in Sri Lanka.
