= Haliophyle euclidias =

Scientific classification
- Kingdom: Animalia
- Phylum: Arthropoda
- Clade: Pancrustacea
- Class: Insecta
- Order: Lepidoptera
- Superfamily: Noctuoidea
- Family: Noctuidae
- Genus: Haliophyle
- Species: H. euclidias

Binomial name
- Haliophyle euclidias (Meyrick, 1899)

Synonyms
- Leucania euclidias Meyrick, 1899; Eriopygodes euclidias (Meyrick, 1899)

Species of moth

Haliophyle euclidias is a moth of the family Noctuidae. It is endemic to Kauai. The larvae feed on ferns.
