= Hypenagonia brachypalpia =

Scientific classification
- Kingdom: Animalia
- Phylum: Arthropoda
- Class: Insecta
- Order: Lepidoptera
- Superfamily: Noctuoidea
- Family: Erebidae
- Genus: Hypenagonia
- Species: H. brachypalpia

Binomial name
- Hypenagonia brachypalpia Hampson, 1912

Species of moth

Hypenagonia brachypalpia is a moth of the family Noctuidae first described by George Hampson in 1912. It is found in Sri Lanka and Borneo.
