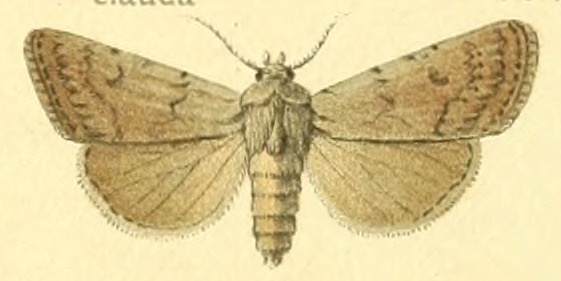

Scientific classification
- Domain: Eukaryota
- Kingdom: Animalia
- Phylum: Arthropoda
- Class: Insecta
- Order: Lepidoptera
- Superfamily: Noctuoidea
- Family: Noctuidae
- Genus: Hemiexarnis
- Species: H. moechilla

Binomial name
- Hemiexarnis moechilla (Püngeler, 1906)

Synonyms
- Euxoa (Agrotis) moechilla Püngeler, 1906; Euxoa cucuna Püngeler, 1906; Hemiexarnis cucuna (Püngeler, 1906); Rhyacia epiphana Boursin, 1940; Hemiexarnis epiphana (Boursin, 1940)

= Hemiexarnis moechilla =

Species of moth

Hemiexarnis moechilla is a moth of the family Noctuidae. The moth has a tympanal organ, with the ability to echolocate, and a holometabolous development. It is found in China.
