= Haliophyle connexa =

Scientific classification
- Kingdom: Animalia
- Phylum: Arthropoda
- Clade: Pancrustacea
- Class: Insecta
- Order: Lepidoptera
- Superfamily: Noctuoidea
- Family: Noctuidae
- Genus: Haliophyle
- Species: H. connexa

Binomial name
- Haliophyle connexa (Warren, 1912)

Synonyms
- Eriopygodes euclidias ab. 1 Hampson, 1905; Haliophyle euclidias ab. connexa Warren, 1912

Species of moth

Haliophyle connexa is a moth of the family Noctuidae. It was first described by William Warren in 1912. It is endemic to the island of Hawaii.
