= Homoglaea dives =

Scientific classification
- Domain: Eukaryota
- Kingdom: Animalia
- Phylum: Arthropoda
- Class: Insecta
- Order: Lepidoptera
- Superfamily: Noctuoidea
- Family: Noctuidae
- Tribe: Xylenini
- Subtribe: Xylenina
- Genus: Homoglaea
- Species: H. dives

Binomial name
- Homoglaea dives Smith, 1907

Species of moth

Homoglaea dives is a species of cutworm or dart moth in the family Noctuidae. It is found in North America.

The MONA or Hodges number for Homoglaea dives is 9882.
