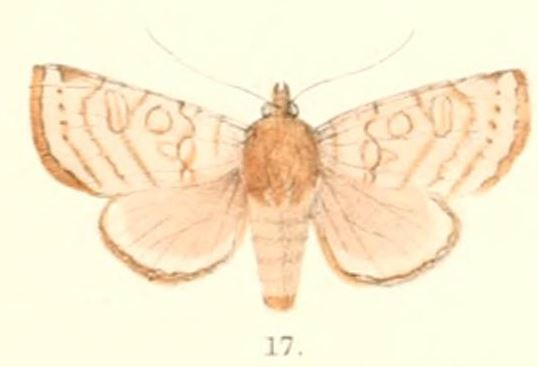

Scientific classification
- Domain: Eukaryota
- Kingdom: Animalia
- Phylum: Arthropoda
- Class: Insecta
- Order: Lepidoptera
- Superfamily: Noctuoidea
- Family: Noctuidae
- Genus: Hermonassa
- Species: H. sinuata

Binomial name
- Hermonassa sinuata (Moore, 1881)

Synonyms
- Dimya sinuata Moore, 1881; Hermonassa cuprina Moore, 1882

= Hermonassa sinuata =

Species of moth

Hermonassa sinuata is a moth of the family Noctuidae first described by Frederic Moore in 1881. It is found in India.
