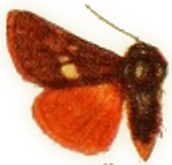

Scientific classification
- Kingdom: Animalia
- Phylum: Arthropoda
- Clade: Pancrustacea
- Class: Insecta
- Order: Lepidoptera
- Superfamily: Noctuoidea
- Family: Noctuidae
- Genus: Heliolonche
- Species: H. celeris

Binomial name
- Heliolonche celeris Grotte, 1873

Synonyms
- Heliothis celeris

= Heliolonche celeris =

Species of moth

Heliolonche celeris is a moth in the family Noctuidae, commonly known as owlet moths, cutworms or armyworms, and are a family of moths. It is found in the state of California, a U.S. State in Northern America.

== Subspecies ==
- Heliolonche celeris celeris
- Heliolonche celeris melicleptrioides
