= Haliophyle anthracias =

Scientific classification
- Kingdom: Animalia
- Phylum: Arthropoda
- Clade: Pancrustacea
- Class: Insecta
- Order: Lepidoptera
- Superfamily: Noctuoidea
- Family: Noctuidae
- Genus: Haliophyle
- Species: H. anthracias

Binomial name
- Haliophyle anthracias (Meyrick, 1899)

Synonyms
- Leucania anthradas Meyrick, 1899; Hyssia anthradas

Species of moth

Haliophyle anthracias is a moth of the family Noctuidae. It was first described by Edward Meyrick in 1899. It is endemic to the Hawaiian island of Maui.
