= Habrostolodes =

Scientific classification
- Kingdom: Animalia
- Phylum: Arthropoda
- Class: Insecta
- Order: Lepidoptera
- Superfamily: Noctuoidea
- Family: Erebidae
- Subfamily: Calpinae
- Genus: Habrostolodes; Hampson, 1926

Genus of moths

Habrostolodes is a genus of moths of the family Erebidae. The genus was erected by George Hampson in 1926.

Butterflies and Moths of the World gives this name as a synonym of Pitara Walker, 1858.

== Species ==
- Habrostolodes congressa Walker, 1858
- Habrostolodes ocarina Draudt & Gaede, 1944
