= Haliophyle ferruginea =

Scientific classification
- Kingdom: Animalia
- Phylum: Arthropoda
- Clade: Pancrustacea
- Class: Insecta
- Order: Lepidoptera
- Superfamily: Noctuoidea
- Family: Noctuidae
- Genus: Haliophyle
- Species: H. ferruginea

Binomial name
- Haliophyle ferruginea (Swezey, 1932)

Synonyms
- Aletia ferruginea Swezey, 1932

Species of moth

Haliophyle ferruginea is a moth of the family Noctuidae. It was first described by Otto Herman Swezey in 1932. It is endemic to the Hawaiian island of Maui.
