= Hypenagonia nigrifascia =

Scientific classification
- Kingdom: Animalia
- Phylum: Arthropoda
- Class: Insecta
- Order: Lepidoptera
- Superfamily: Noctuoidea
- Family: Erebidae
- Genus: Hypenagonia
- Species: H. nigrifascia

Binomial name
- Hypenagonia nigrifascia Hampson, 1893

Species of moth

Hypenagonia nigrifascia is a moth of the family Noctuidae first described by George Hampson in 1893. It is found in Sri Lanka.
