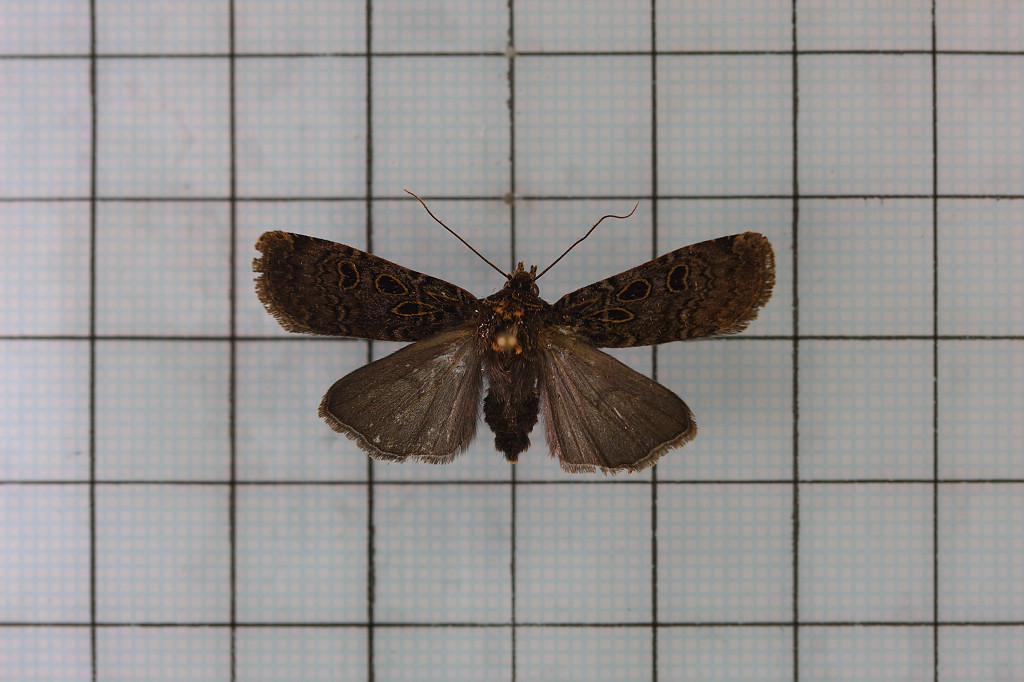

Scientific classification
- Domain: Eukaryota
- Kingdom: Animalia
- Phylum: Arthropoda
- Class: Insecta
- Order: Lepidoptera
- Superfamily: Noctuoidea
- Family: Noctuidae
- Genus: Hermonassa
- Species: H. formontana

Binomial name
- Hermonassa formontana Hreblay & Ronkay, 1997

= Hermonassa formontana =

Species of moth

Hermonassa formontana is a moth of the family Noctuidae. It is found in Taiwan.
