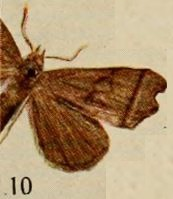

Scientific classification
- Domain: Eukaryota
- Kingdom: Animalia
- Phylum: Arthropoda
- Class: Insecta
- Order: Lepidoptera
- Superfamily: Noctuoidea
- Family: Erebidae
- Genus: Hondryches
- Species: H. avakubi

Binomial name
- Hondryches avakubi (Holland, 1920)

Synonyms
- Rhynchodes avakubi Holland, 1920

= Hondryches avakubi =

Species of moth

Hondryches avakubi is a moth of the family Noctuidae first described by William Jacob Holland in 1920. It is found in Cameroon and the Democratic Republic of the Congo.
