= Hadennia jutalis =

Scientific classification
- Kingdom: Animalia
- Phylum: Arthropoda
- Class: Insecta
- Order: Lepidoptera
- Superfamily: Noctuoidea
- Family: Erebidae
- Genus: Hadennia
- Species: H. jutalis

Binomial name
- Hadennia jutalis Walker, [1859]

Synonyms
- Bocana jutalis Walker, [1859]

Species of moth

Hadennia jutalis is a moth of the family Noctuidae first described by Francis Walker in 1859. It is found in India, Sri Lanka, Thailand, Malaysia, Laos, Vietnam, Myanmar and the Andaman Islands.
