= Hypoechana =

Scientific classification
- Domain: Eukaryota
- Kingdom: Animalia
- Phylum: Arthropoda
- Class: Insecta
- Order: Lepidoptera
- Superfamily: Noctuoidea
- Family: Erebidae
- Subfamily: Herminiinae
- Genus: Hypoechana; H. Druce in Godman & Salvin, 1891
- Species: H. fuliginosa

Binomial name
- Hypoechana fuliginosa H. Druce, 1891

Genus of moths

Hypoechana is a monotypic moth genus of the family Erebidae. Its only species, Hypoechana fuliginosa, is known from Mexico, Panama and Guatemala. Both the genus and the species were first described by Herbert Druce in 1891.
