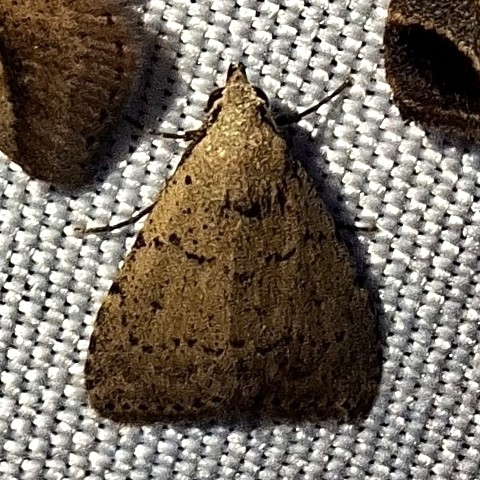

Scientific classification
- Kingdom: Animalia
- Phylum: Arthropoda
- Clade: Pancrustacea
- Class: Insecta
- Order: Lepidoptera
- Superfamily: Noctuoidea
- Family: Noctuidae
- Subfamily: Acontiinae
- Genus: Hopothia; Dyar, 1914
- Species: H. histigma

Binomial name
- Hopothia histigma Dyar, 1914

= Hopothia =

Hopothia histigma

Genus of moths

Hopothia is a monotypic genus of moths in the family Noctuidae. Its only species, Hopothia histigma, is found in Panama. Both the genus and species were first described by Harrison Gray Dyar Jr. in 1914.
