= Himerois =

Scientific classification
- Domain: Eukaryota
- Kingdom: Animalia
- Phylum: Arthropoda
- Class: Insecta
- Order: Lepidoptera
- Superfamily: Noctuoidea
- Family: Noctuidae
- Subfamily: Acontiinae
- Genus: Himerois; Turner, 1902

Genus of moths

Himerois is a genus of moths of the family Noctuidae. The genus was described by Turner in 1902.

== Species ==
- Himerois angustitaenia Warren, 1913
- Himerois basiscripta Warren, 1913
- Himerois periphaea Turner, 1920
- Himerois thiochroa Turner, 1902
- Himerois univittata Pagenstecher, 1900
