= Hypotrisula =

Scientific classification
- Kingdom: Animalia
- Phylum: Arthropoda
- Class: Insecta
- Order: Lepidoptera
- Superfamily: Noctuoidea
- Family: Erebidae
- Subfamily: Calpinae
- Genus: Hypotrisula; Hampson, 1926
- Species: H. boarmioides

Binomial name
- Hypotrisula boarmioides (Walker, 1865)

Synonyms
- Steiria boarmioides Walker, 1865

Genus of moths

Hypotrisula is a monotypic moth genus of the family Erebidae erected by George Hampson in 1926. Its only species, Hypotrisula boarmioides, was first described by Francis Walker in 1865. It is found in northern India.
