= Haliophyle =

Scientific classification
- Domain: Eukaryota
- Kingdom: Animalia
- Phylum: Arthropoda
- Class: Insecta
- Order: Lepidoptera
- Superfamily: Noctuoidea
- Family: Noctuidae
- Subfamily: Noctuinae
- Genus: Haliophyle; Warren, 1912

Genus of moths

Haliophyle is a genus of moths of the family Noctuidae.

== Species ==
- Haliophyle anthracias (Meyrick, 1899)
- Haliophyle compsias (Meyrick, 1899)
- Haliophyle connexa (Warren, 1912)
- Haliophyle euclidias (Meyrick, 1899)
- Haliophyle ferruginea (Swezey, 1932)
- Haliophyle flavistigma (Warren, 1912)
- Haliophyle ignita (Warren, 1912)
- Haliophyle niphadopa (Meyrick, 1899)
