= Haemaphlebia =

Scientific classification
- Kingdom: Animalia
- Phylum: Arthropoda
- Class: Insecta
- Order: Lepidoptera
- Superfamily: Noctuoidea
- Family: Noctuidae
- Subfamily: Acontiinae
- Genus: Haemaphlebia; Hampson, 1910

Genus of moths

Haemaphlebia is a genus of moths of the family Noctuidae. The genus was erected by George Hampson in 1910.

== Species ==
- Haemaphlebia atripalpis Hampson, 1910 Ghana, Liberia, Nigeria, Uganda
- Haemaphlebia caliginosa Hacker, 2019 Ivory Coast
- Haemaphlebia fasciolata Hacker, 2019 Burkina Faso, Nigeria, Somalia
- Haemaphlebia fiebigiana Hacker & Stadie, 2019 Uganda
- Haemaphlebia gola Hacker, 2019 Liberia
- Haemaphlebia lanceolata Hacker, 2019 Burkina Faso
- Haemaphlebia pallidifusca Hacker, 2019 Guinea, Tanzania
