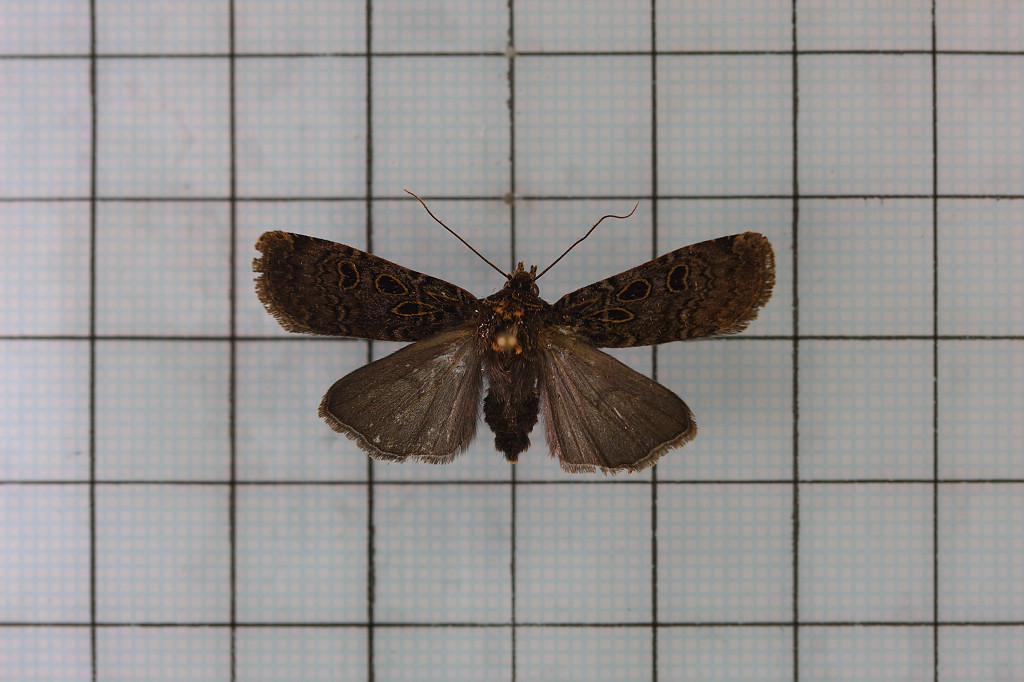
- Hermonassa formontana

Scientific classification
- Kingdom: Animalia
- Phylum: Arthropoda
- Class: Insecta
- Order: Lepidoptera
- Superfamily: Noctuoidea
- Family: Noctuidae
- Subfamily: Noctuinae
- Genus: Hermonassa; Walker 1865

= Hermonassa (moth) =

Genus of moths

Hermonassa is a genus of moths of the family Noctuidae.

== Species ==
- Hermonassa anthracina Boursin, 1967
- Hermonassa arenosa (Butler, 1881)
- Hermonassa callista Boursin, 1968
- Hermonassa cecilia Butler, 1878
- Hermonassa chagyabensis Chen, 1983
- Hermonassa chersotidia Boursin, 1968
- Hermonassa chlora Boursin, 1967
- Hermonassa chryserythra Boursin, 1968
- Hermonassa clava (Leech, 1900)
- Hermonassa consignata Walker, 1865
- Hermonassa cyanerythra Boursin, 1968
- Hermonassa cyanolepis Boursin, 1967
- Hermonassa diaphana Boursin, 1967
- Hermonassa diaphthorea Boursin, 1967
- Hermonassa dichroma Boursin, 1967
- Hermonassa dictyodes Boursin, 1967
- Hermonassa dictyota Boursin, 1967
- Hermonassa difficilis (Erschoff, 1877)
- Hermonassa dispila Boursin, 1967
- Hermonassa ellenae Boursin, 1967
- Hermonassa emodicola Boursin, 1967
- Hermonassa finitima Warren, 1909
- Hermonassa formontana Hreblay & Ronkay, 1997
- Hermonassa furva Warren, 1912
- Hermonassa griseosignata Chen, 1983
- Hermonassa hoenei Boursin, 1967
- Hermonassa hypoleuca Boursin, 1957
- Hermonassa incisa Moore, 1882
- Hermonassa inconstans Wileman, 1912
- Hermonassa lama Boursin, 1967
- Hermonassa lanceola (Moore, 1867)
- Hermonassa lineata Warren, 1912
- Hermonassa macrotheca Boursin, 1968
- Hermonassa marsypiophora Boursin, 1967
- Hermonassa megaspila Boursin, 1967
- Hermonassa oleographa Hampson, 1911
- Hermonassa orbicularis Boursin, 1967
- Hermonassa orphnina Boursin, 1967
- Hermonassa oxyspila Boursin, 1968
- Hermonassa pallidula (Leech, 1900)
- Hermonassa phenax Boursin, 1968
- Hermonassa psilodora Boursin, 1968
- Hermonassa pygmaea Boursin, 1967
- Hermonassa reticulata Boursin, 1967
- Hermonassa roesleri Boursin, 1967
- Hermonassa rufa Boursin, 1968
- Hermonassa sinuata Moore, 1881
- Hermonassa spilota (Moore, 1867)
- Hermonassa stigmatica Warren, 1912
- Hermonassa tamsi Boursin, 1968
- Hermonassa xanthochlora Boursin, 1967
