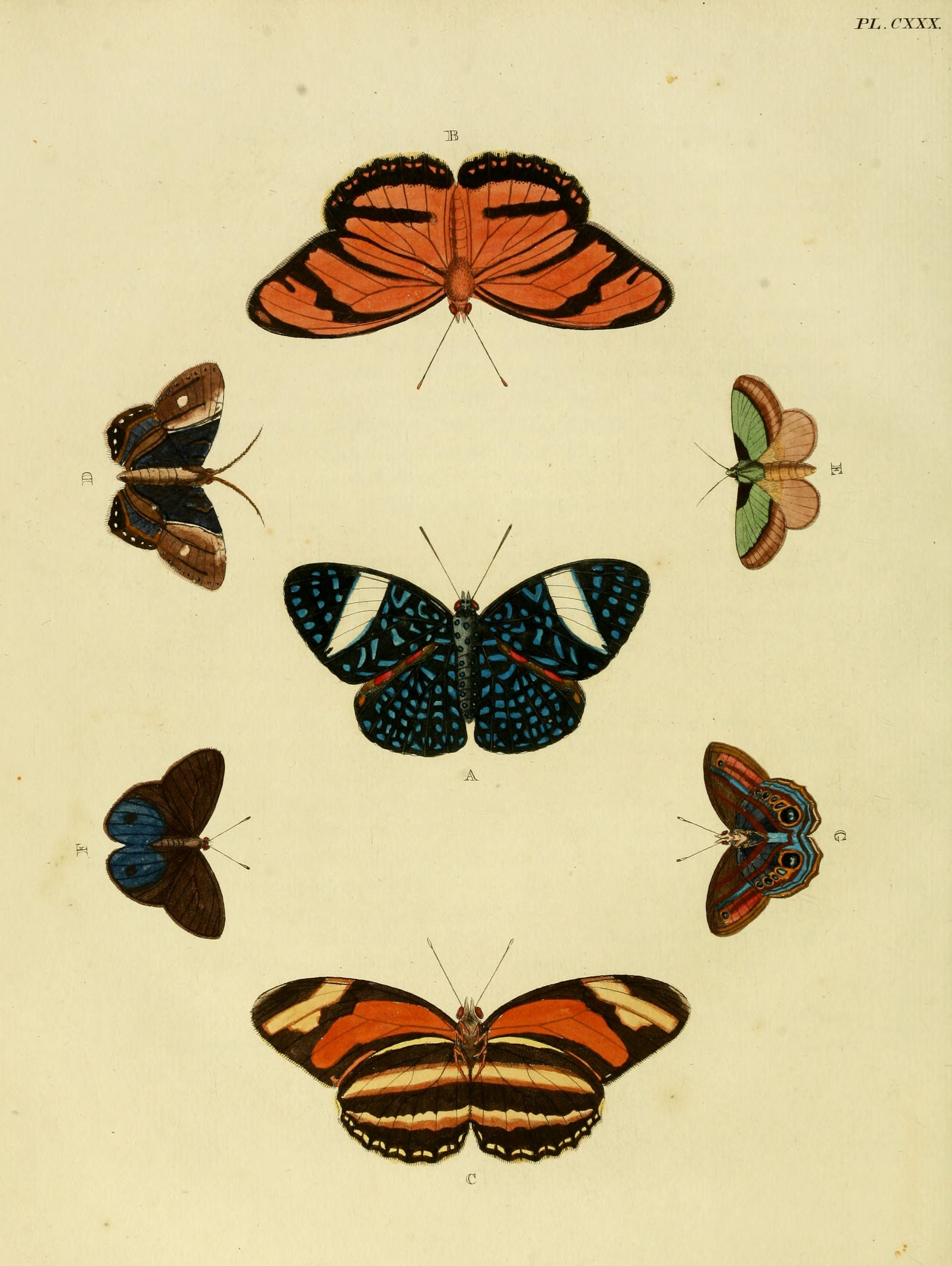

Scientific classification
- Kingdom: Animalia
- Phylum: Arthropoda
- Class: Insecta
- Order: Lepidoptera
- Superfamily: Noctuoidea
- Family: Erebidae
- Subfamily: Calpinae
- Genus: Habershonia; Nye, 1975
- Species: H. areos

Binomial name
- Habershonia areos (Cramer, [1777])

Synonyms
- Generic: Brachyblemma Hampson, 1926; Specific: Phalaena (Geometra) areos Cramer, [1777]; Hemeroblemma areopagita Hübner, [1823]

= Habershonia =

Genus of moths

Habershonia is a monotypic moth genus of the family Erebidae described by Nye in 1975. Its only species, Habershonia areos, was first described by Pieter Cramer in 1777. It is found in the Virgin Islands.
