= Hyponeuma =

Scientific classification
- Domain: Eukaryota
- Kingdom: Animalia
- Phylum: Arthropoda
- Class: Insecta
- Order: Lepidoptera
- Superfamily: Noctuoidea
- Family: Erebidae
- Subfamily: Herminiinae
- Genus: Hyponeuma; Schaus, 1906
- Species: H. taltula

Binomial name
- Hyponeuma taltula (Schaus, 1904)

Synonyms
- Herminodes taltula Schaus, 1904; Hyponeuma leucanioides Schaus, 1906

Genus of moths

Hyponeuma is a monotypic moth genus of the family Erebidae. Its only species, Hyponeuma taltula, is found in the Brazilian states of São Paulo and Paraná. Both the genus and species were first described by William Schaus, the genus in 1906 and the species two years earlier.
