= Halochroa =

Scientific classification
- Domain: Eukaryota
- Kingdom: Animalia
- Phylum: Arthropoda
- Class: Insecta
- Order: Lepidoptera
- Superfamily: Noctuoidea
- Family: Erebidae
- Subfamily: Calpinae
- Genus: Halochroa; Hampson, 1926

Genus of moths

Halochroa is a genus of moths of the family Erebidae. The genus was erected by George Hampson in 1926.

== Species ==
- Halochroa aequatoria (Mabille, 1879) Ivory Coast, Ghana, Cameroon, Guinea, Zaire, Angola, Ethiopia, Kenya, Uganda, Zambia
- Halochroa eudela D. S. Fletcher, 1963 Zaire, Uganda, Kenya, Malawi, Tanzania, Mozambique, Zimbabwe
