= Hypercodia =

Scientific classification
- Kingdom: Animalia
- Phylum: Arthropoda
- Class: Insecta
- Order: Lepidoptera
- Superfamily: Noctuoidea
- Family: Noctuidae
- Subfamily: Acontiinae
- Genus: Hypercodia; Hampson, 1910

Genus of moths

Hypercodia is a genus of moths of the family Noctuidae. The genus was erected by George Hampson in 1910.

== Species ==
- Hypercodia disparilis (Walker, 1863) Peninsular Malaysia, Borneo
- Hypercodia rubritincta Wileman & South, 1916 Taiwan
- Hypercodia umbrimedia (Hampson, 1918) India (Meghalaya)
- Hypercodia wheeleri Pinhey, 1968 Zimbabwe, Zambia, South Africa
