= Himalistra =

Scientific classification
- Domain: Eukaryota
- Kingdom: Animalia
- Phylum: Arthropoda
- Class: Insecta
- Order: Lepidoptera
- Superfamily: Noctuoidea
- Family: Noctuidae
- Subfamily: Cuculliinae
- Genus: Himalistra; Hacker & Ronkay, 1992

Genus of moths

Himalistra is a genus of moths of the family Noctuidae.

== Species ==
- Himalistra arcessita Hacker & Ronkay, 1992
- Himalistra aristata Hreblay, Plante & Ronkay, 1995
- Himalistra caesia Hreblay, Plante & Ronkay, 1994
- Himalistra eriophora (Püngeler, 1901)
- Himalistra extera Hacker & Ronkay, 1992
- Himalistra fusca Hacker & Ronkay, 1992
- Himalistra hackeri Hreblay, Plante & Ronkay, 1995
- Himalistra nekrasovi Hacker & Ronkay, 1992
- Himalistra nivea Hreblay, Plante & Ronkay, 1994
- Himalistra obscura Hreblay, Plante & Ronkay, 1995
- Himalistra rubida Hreblay, Plante & Ronkay, 1995
- Himalistra tahiricola Ronkay & Hreblay, 1994
- Himalistra variabilis Hreblay, Plante & Ronkay, 1995
