= Homolagoa =

Scientific classification
- Domain: Eukaryota
- Kingdom: Animalia
- Phylum: Arthropoda
- Class: Insecta
- Order: Lepidoptera
- Superfamily: Noctuoidea
- Family: Noctuidae
- Genus: Homolagoa; Barnes & McDunnough, 1912
- Species: H. grotelliformis

Binomial name
- Homolagoa grotelliformis Barnes & McDunnough, 1912

Genus of moths

Homolagoa is a monotypic moth genus of the family Noctuidae (the owlet moths). Its only species, Homolagoa grotelliformis, is found in North America. Both the genus and species were first described by William Barnes and James Halliday McDunnough in 1912.

The MONA or Hodges number for Homolagoa grotelliformis is 9043.
