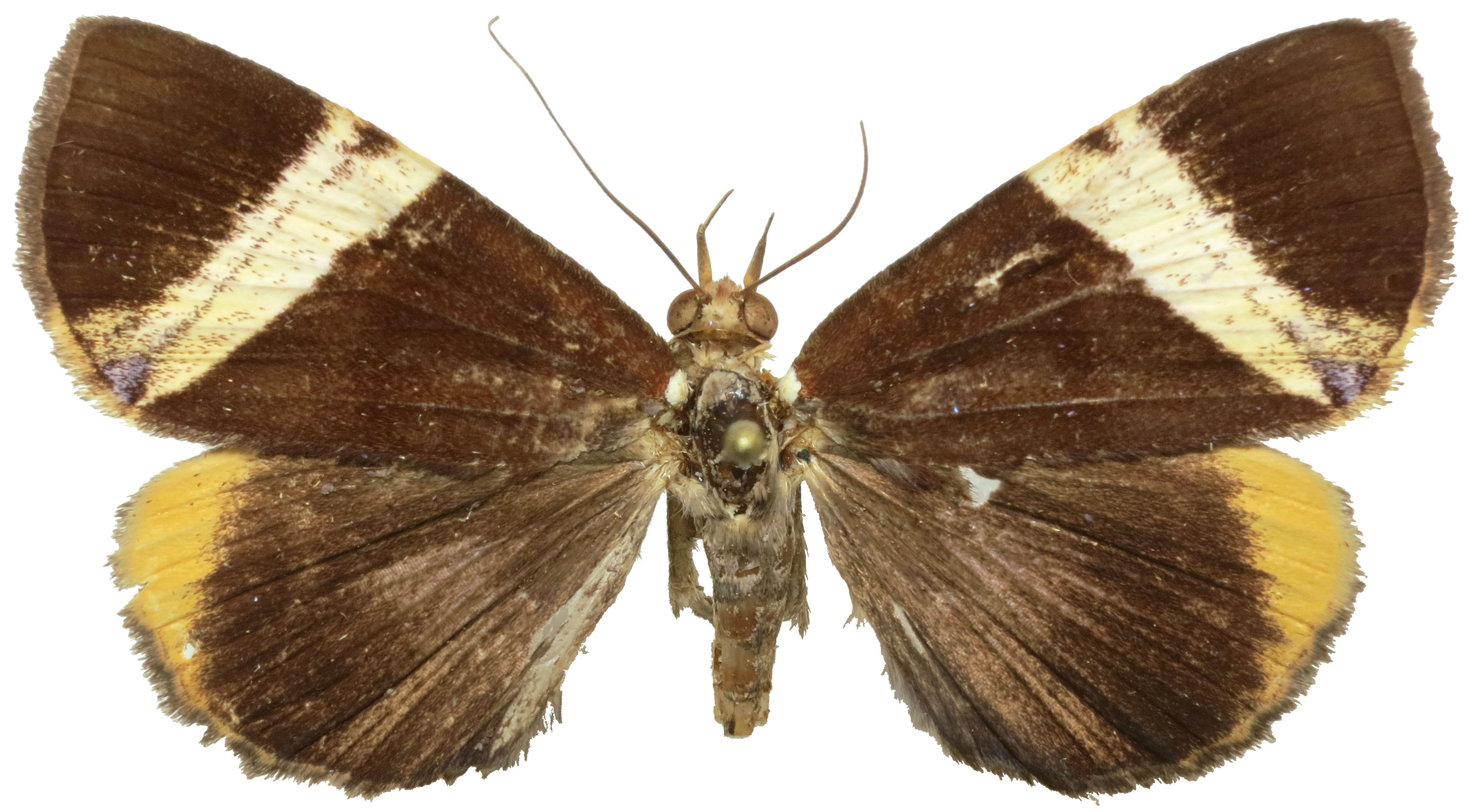
- Heoeugorna ochrovittata female - Palawan, Philippines

Scientific classification
- Kingdom: Animalia
- Phylum: Arthropoda
- Class: Insecta
- Order: Lepidoptera
- Superfamily: Noctuoidea
- Family: Erebidae
- Subfamily: Calpinae
- Genus: Heoeugorna; Hampson in Tams, 1924

= Heoeugorna =

Genus of moths

Heoeugorna is a genus of moths of the family Erebidae. The genus was erected by George Hampson in 1924.

== Species ==
- Heoeugorna alboarcuata (Bethune-Baker, 1906) New Guinea
- Heoeugorna flavicincta Hampson, 1926 Sumatra, Peninsular Malaysia, Borneo
- Heoeugorna ochrovittata (Pagenstecher, 1894) Java, Bali, Peninsular Malaysia, Singapore, Borneo
