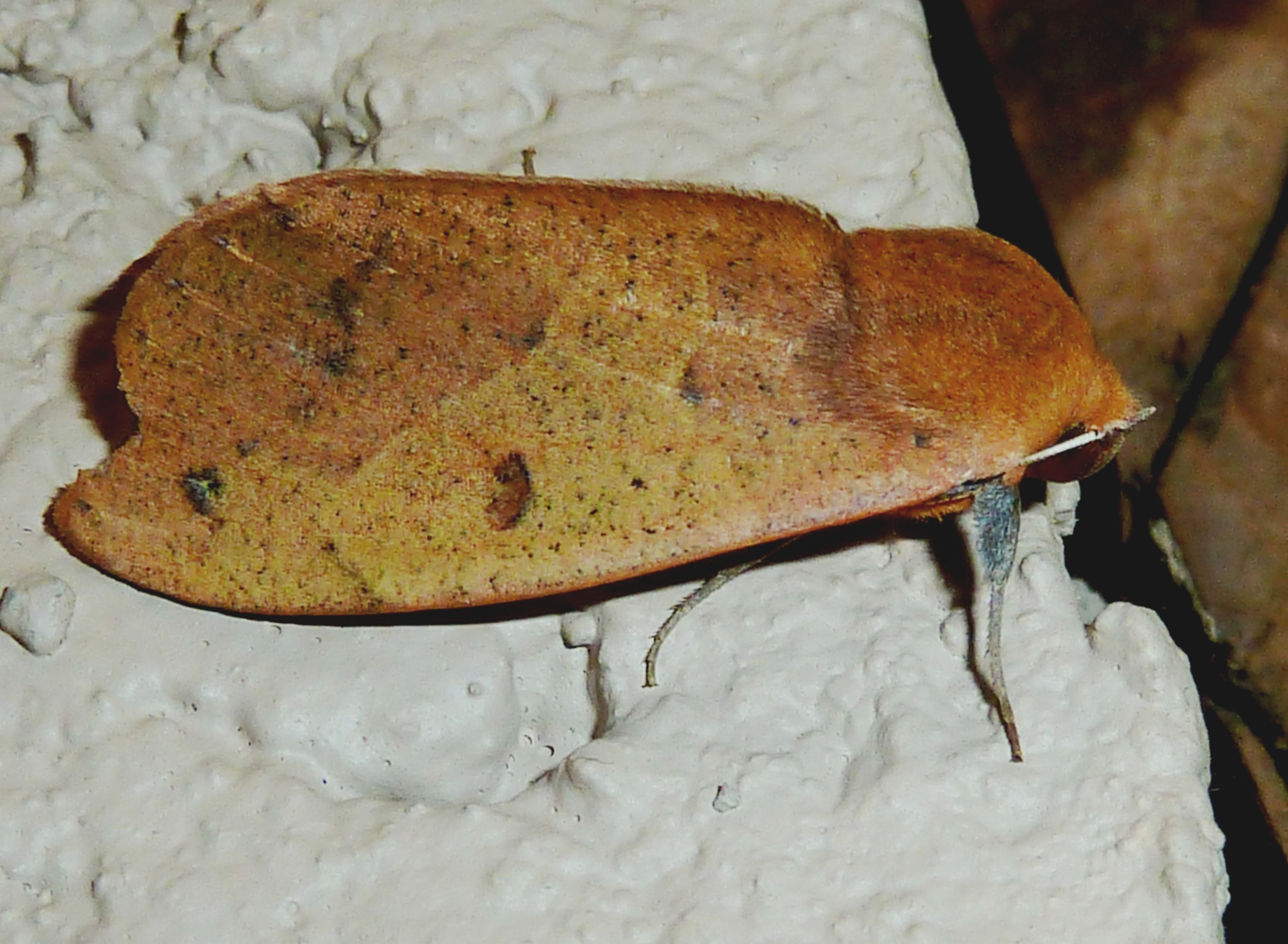
- Hypanua roseitincta

Scientific classification
- Kingdom: Animalia
- Phylum: Arthropoda
- Class: Insecta
- Order: Lepidoptera
- Superfamily: Noctuoidea
- Family: Noctuidae (?)
- Subfamily: Catocalinae
- Genus: Hypanua; Hampson, 1913

= Hypanua =

Genus of moths

Hypanua is a genus of moths of the family Erebidae. The genus was erected by George Hampson in 1913.

== Species ==
- Hypanua dinawa Bethune-Baker, 1906
- Hypanua roseitincta Hampson, 1918
- Hypanua xylina Distant, 1898
