= Homoanarta =

Scientific classification
- Domain: Eukaryota
- Kingdom: Animalia
- Phylum: Arthropoda
- Class: Insecta
- Order: Lepidoptera
- Superfamily: Noctuoidea
- Family: Noctuidae
- Subfamily: Cuculliinae
- Genus: Homoanarta; Barnes & Benjamin, 1923

Genus of moths

Homoanarta is a genus of moths of the family Noctuidae erected by William Barnes and Foster Hendrickson Benjamin in 1923.

== Species ==
- Homoanarta carneola (Smith, 1891)
- Homoanarta cristifer (Dyar, 1918)
- Homoanarta falcata (Neumoegen, 1884)
- Homoanarta farinosa Draudt, 1925
- Homoanarta nudor (Dyar, 1920)
- Homoanarta peralta (Barnes, 1907)
- Homoanarta senescens (Dyar, 1918)
