= Hypangitia =

Scientific classification
- Kingdom: Animalia
- Phylum: Arthropoda
- Class: Insecta
- Order: Lepidoptera
- Superfamily: Noctuoidea
- Family: Noctuidae
- Subfamily: Acontiinae
- Genus: Hypangitia; Hampson, 1918
- Species: H. peratopis

Binomial name
- Hypangitia peratopis Hampson, 1918

Genus of moths

Hypangitia is a monotypic moth genus of the family Noctuidae. Its only species, Hypangitia peratopis, is found in Paraguay. Both the genus and species were first described by George Hampson in 1918.
