= Heterogramma =

Scientific classification
- Kingdom: Animalia
- Phylum: Arthropoda
- Class: Insecta
- Order: Lepidoptera
- Superfamily: Noctuoidea
- Family: Erebidae
- Subfamily: Herminiinae
- Genus: Heterogramma; Guenée in Boisduval & Guenée, 1854

Synonyms
- Herminiella Kaye & Lamont, 1927

Genus of moths

Heterogramma is a genus of moths of the family Noctuidae. The genus was erected by Achille Guenée in 1854.

== Species ==
- Heterogramma aeripalpis Snellen, 1880 Sulawesi
- Heterogramma biangula Bethune-Baker, 1908 New Guinea
- Heterogramma circumflexalis Guenée, 1854 Brazil
- Heterogramma clavalis Snellen, 1880 Sulawesi
- Heterogramma contempta Schaus, 1913 Costa Rica
- Heterogramma didyma Snellen, 1880 Sulawesi
- Heterogramma fuscicollis Snellen, 1880 Sulawesi
- Heterogramma micculalis Guenée, 1854 Haiti
- Heterogramma pseudopsodos Snellen, 1880 Sulawesi
- Heterogramma terminalis (Herrich-Schäffer, 1870) Cuba
