= Haematosticta =

Scientific classification
- Kingdom: Animalia
- Phylum: Arthropoda
- Class: Insecta
- Order: Lepidoptera
- Superfamily: Noctuoidea
- Family: Noctuidae
- Subfamily: Acontiinae
- Genus: Haematosticta; Hampson, 1896
- Species: H. sanguiguttata

Binomial name
- Haematosticta sanguiguttata Hampson, 1896

Genus of moths

Haematosticta is a monotypic moth genus of the family Noctuidae. Its only species, Haematosticta sanguiguttata, is found in Sri Lanka. Both the genus and species were first described by George Hampson in 1896.
