= Hyriodes =

Scientific classification
- Kingdom: Animalia
- Phylum: Arthropoda
- Class: Insecta
- Order: Lepidoptera
- Superfamily: Noctuoidea
- Family: Noctuidae
- Subfamily: Acontiinae
- Genus: Hyriodes; Hampson, 1910
- Species: H. leucocraspis

Binomial name
- Hyriodes leucocraspis Hampson, 1910

Genus of moths

Hyriodes is a monotypic moth genus of the family Noctuidae. Its only species, Hyriodes leucocraspis, is found in Borneo. Both the genus and species were first described by George Hampson in 1910.
