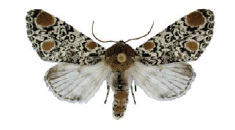
- Harrisimemna trisignata

Scientific classification
- Kingdom: Animalia
- Phylum: Arthropoda
- Class: Insecta
- Order: Lepidoptera
- Superfamily: Noctuoidea
- Family: Noctuidae
- Subfamily: Acronictinae
- Genus: Harrisimemna; Grote, 1873

= Harrisimemna =

Genus of moths

Harrisimemna is a genus of moths of the family Noctuidae. The genus was erected by Augustus Radcliffe Grote in 1873.

== Species ==
- Harrisimemna trisignata (Walker, 1856) Ontario, Massachusetts, New York, Pennsylvania, Wisconsin, Missouri
- Harrisimemna marmorata Hampson, 1908 Japan
