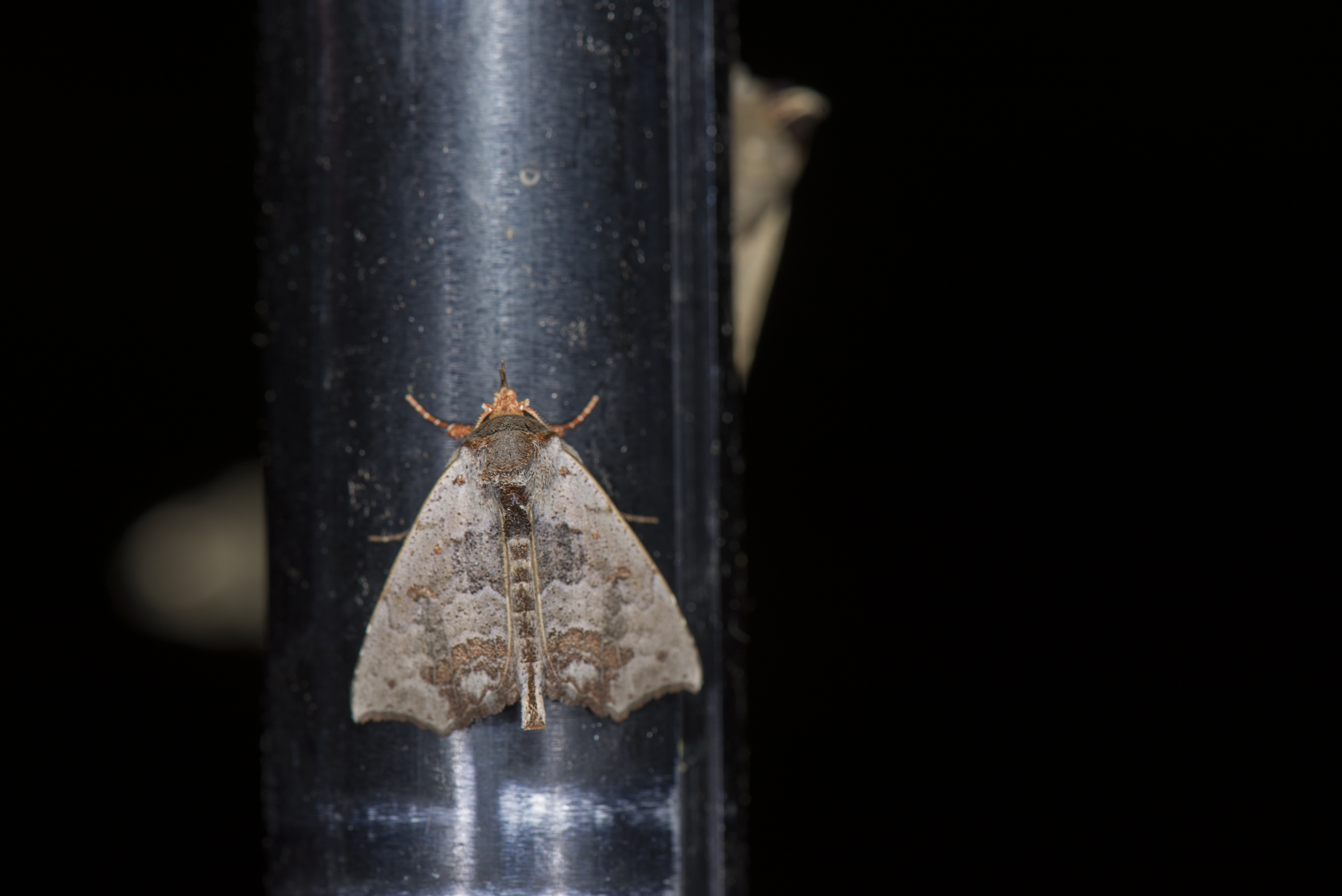
- Hyperlopha compactilis

Scientific classification
- Domain: Eukaryota
- Kingdom: Animalia
- Phylum: Arthropoda
- Class: Insecta
- Order: Lepidoptera
- Superfamily: Noctuoidea
- Family: Erebidae
- Subfamily: Calpinae
- Genus: Hyperlopha; Hampson, 1895

= Hyperlopha =

Genus of insects

Hyperlopha is a genus of moths of the family Erebidae. The genus was erected by George Hampson in 1895.

== Description ==
Palpi with second joint reaching above vertex of head. Third joint long and naked. Antennae with long cilia and bristles in male. Thorax with a high sharp tuft found behind collar. Abdomen smoothly scaled. Tibia slightly hairy. Forewings with arched costa. Apex acute and produced. Hindwings with rounded outer margin. Vein 5 from near middle of discocellulars.

== Species ==
- Hyperlopha amicta Turner, 1903 northern Queensland
- Hyperlopha aridela Turner, 1902 Queensland
- Hyperlopha bigoti Berio, 1971 Indochina
- Hyperlopha catenata Berio, 1971 Indochina
- Hyperlopha compactilis (Swinhoe, 1890) Myanmar, Peninsular Malaysia, Taiwan
- Hyperlopha cristifera (Walker, 1865) Ceylon, Andamans, Kei, Hiamalayas
- Hyperlopha crucifera Holloway, 2005 Borneo
- Hyperlopha discontenta (Walker, 1864) Thailand, Peninsular Malaysia, Sumatra, Borneo
- Hyperlopha flavipennis Holloway, 1976 Borneo, Peninsular Malaysia
- Hyperlopha didyana Viette, 1968 Madagascar
- Hyperlopha flexuosa Viette, 1968 Madagascar
- Hyperlopha ralambo Viette, 1968 Madagascar
- Hyperlopha rectefasciata (Kenrick, 1917) Madagascar
