= Hulypegis =

Scientific classification
- Domain: Eukaryota
- Kingdom: Animalia
- Phylum: Arthropoda
- Class: Insecta
- Order: Lepidoptera
- Superfamily: Noctuoidea
- Family: Erebidae
- Subfamily: Calpinae
- Genus: Hulypegis; Nye, 1975
- Species: H. procopialis

Binomial name
- Hulypegis procopialis (Hübner, [1825])

Synonyms
- Generic: Euglyphis Hübner, [1825]; Specific: Euglyphis procopialis Hübner, [1825]; Phalaena procopia Stoll, [1790]

Genus of moths

Hulypegis is a monotypic moth genus of the family Erebidae described by Nye in 1975. Its only species, Hulypegis procopialis, was first described by Jacob Hübner in 1825. It is found in Suriname.
