= Holoxanthina =

Scientific classification
- Kingdom: Animalia
- Phylum: Arthropoda
- Class: Insecta
- Order: Lepidoptera
- Superfamily: Noctuoidea
- Family: Erebidae
- Subfamily: Calpinae
- Genus: Holoxanthina; Hampson, 1926

Genus of moths

Holoxanthina is a genus of moths of the family Erebidae. The genus was erected by George Hampson in 1926.

== Species ==
- Holoxanthina lutosa (Karsch, 1895) Togo
- Holoxanthina rhodotela (Viette, 1958) Madagascar
