= Haemachola =

Scientific classification
- Domain: Eukaryota
- Kingdom: Animalia
- Phylum: Arthropoda
- Class: Insecta
- Order: Lepidoptera
- Superfamily: Noctuoidea
- Family: Noctuidae
- Subfamily: Cuculliinae
- Genus: Haemachola

Genus of moths

Haemachola is a genus of moths of the family Noctuidae. Subspecies include s.lilia, s.natalie, s.vivian, s.alexis and s.jillian.

== Bibliography ==
- Natural History Museum Lepidoptera genus database
