= Hyperbaniana =

Scientific classification
- Kingdom: Animalia
- Phylum: Arthropoda
- Class: Insecta
- Order: Lepidoptera
- Superfamily: Noctuoidea
- Family: Erebidae
- Subfamily: Calpinae
- Genus: Hyperbaniana; Hampson, 1926
- Species: H. costinotata

Binomial name
- Hyperbaniana costinotata Hampson, 1926

Genus of moths

Hyperbaniana is a monotypic moth genus of the family Erebidae. Its only species, Hyperbaniana costinotata, is found in Sulawesi. Both the genus and species were first described by George Hampson in 1926.
