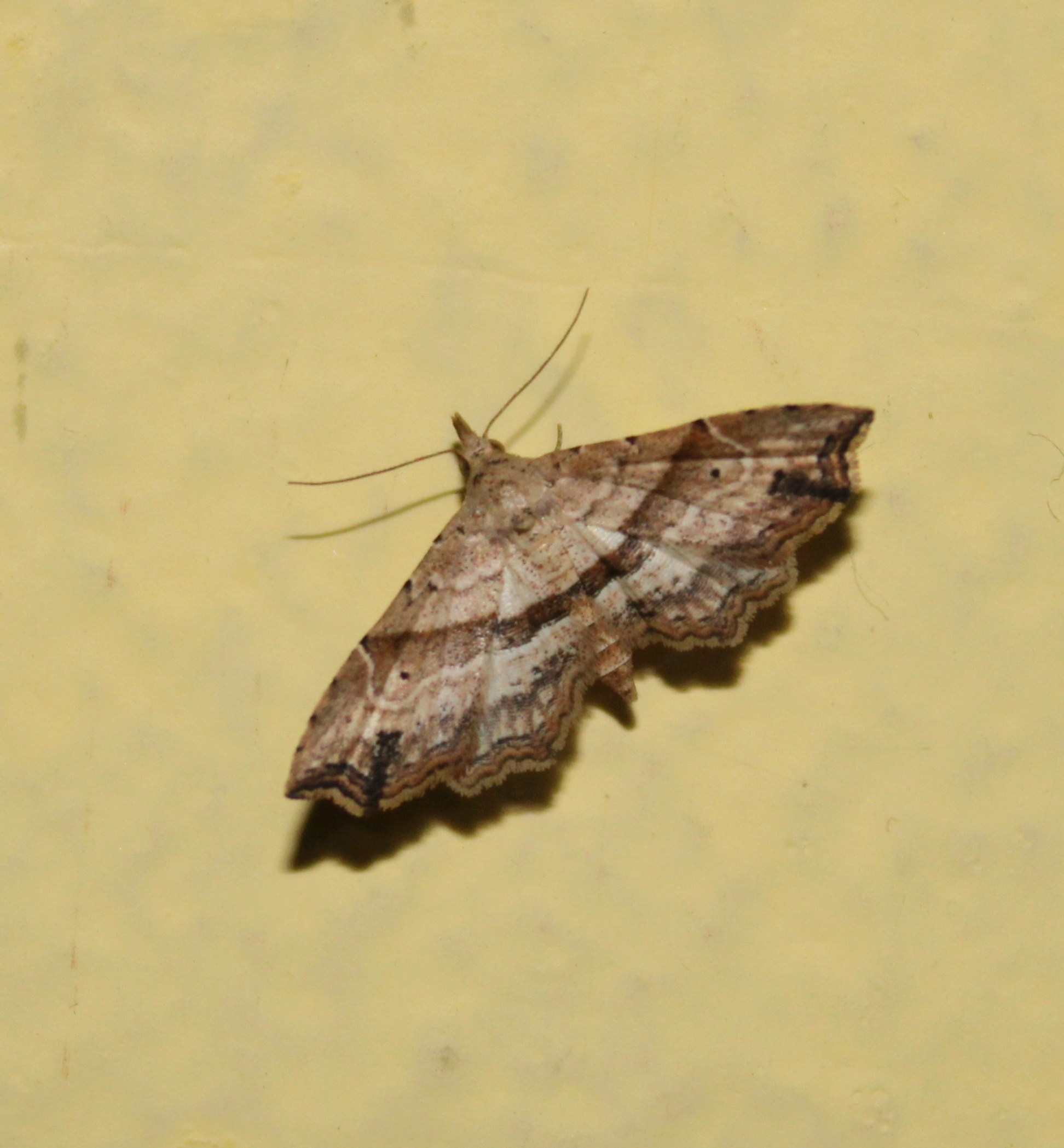

Scientific classification
- Kingdom: Animalia
- Phylum: Arthropoda
- Class: Insecta
- Order: Lepidoptera
- Superfamily: Noctuoidea
- Family: Erebidae
- Subfamily: Boletobiinae
- Genus: Hypenagonia; Hampson, 1893

Synonyms
- Hypenarana Bethune-Baker, 1908; Hypenagoniodes Strand, 1920; Tipasodes Hampson, 1926

= Hypenagonia =

Genus of moths

Hypenagonia is a genus of moths of the family Erebidae first described by George Hampson in 1893. The adult moths have pale brown wings with a dark band across each wing. The wingspan of these moths is about 1 centimeter.

== Taxonomy ==
The genus has previously been classified in the subfamily Hypeninae within either the families Erebidae or Noctuidae.

== Description ==
Palpi of moderate length, where the second joint fringed with scaled above. Third joint minute. Frontal tuft short. Antennae annulate (ringed). Thorax and abdomen smoothly scaled. Tibia hairless. Forewings long and narrow. Outer margin angled at middle. Veins 7 to 9 stalked. Hindwings with highly angled outer margin at middle and excised towards anal angle. Veins 3, 4 and 6, 7 stalked, whereas vein 5 from near lower angle of cell.

== Species ==
- Hypenagonia acrocausta (Turner, 1944) Queensland
- Hypenagonia angulata Wileman, 1915 Formosa
- Hypenagonia anna Robinson, 1975 Fiji
- Hypenagonia barbara Robinson, 1975 Fiji
- Hypenagonia bipuncta Wileman, 1915 Formosa
- Hypenagonia brachypalpia Hampson, 1912 Sri Lanka, Borneo
- Hypenagonia brunnea Bethune-Baker, 1908 New Guinea
- Hypenagonia catherina Robinson, 1975 Fiji
- Hypenagonia diana Robinson, 1975 Fiji
- Hypenagonia dohertyi Holloway, 2008 Pulo Laut in Borneo
- Hypenagonia emma Robinson, 1975 Fiji
- Hypenagonia flavisigna Hampson, 1912 Sri Lanka
- Hypenagonia hefferi Holloway, 2008 Borneo
- Hypenagonia henseli Holloway, 2008 Borneo
- Hypenagonia leucosticta Hampson, 1895 Bhuta
- Hypenagonia longipalpis Hampson, 1912 Sri Lanka, India, Borneo
- Hypenagonia mediifascia Wileman & South, 1917 Formosa
- Hypenagonia melalepidia (Hampson, 1926) New Guinea
- Hypenagonia mesoscia (Turner, 1933) Queensland
- Hypenagonia minor Wileman, 1915 Formosa
- Hypenagonia nigrifascia Hampson, 1893 Sri Lanka
- Hypenagonia normata Joannis, 1929 Vietnam
- Hypenagonia obliquifascia Wileman & South, 1917 Formosa
- Hypenagonia pallifurca Holloway, 2008 Borneo
- Hypenagonia rosacea (Bethune-Baker, 1908) New Guinea
- Hypenagonia subsuffusata Wileman & West, 1930 Formosa
- Hypenagonia vexataria (Walker, 1861) Borneo
- Hypenagonia vexatariola (Strand, 1920) Formosa
