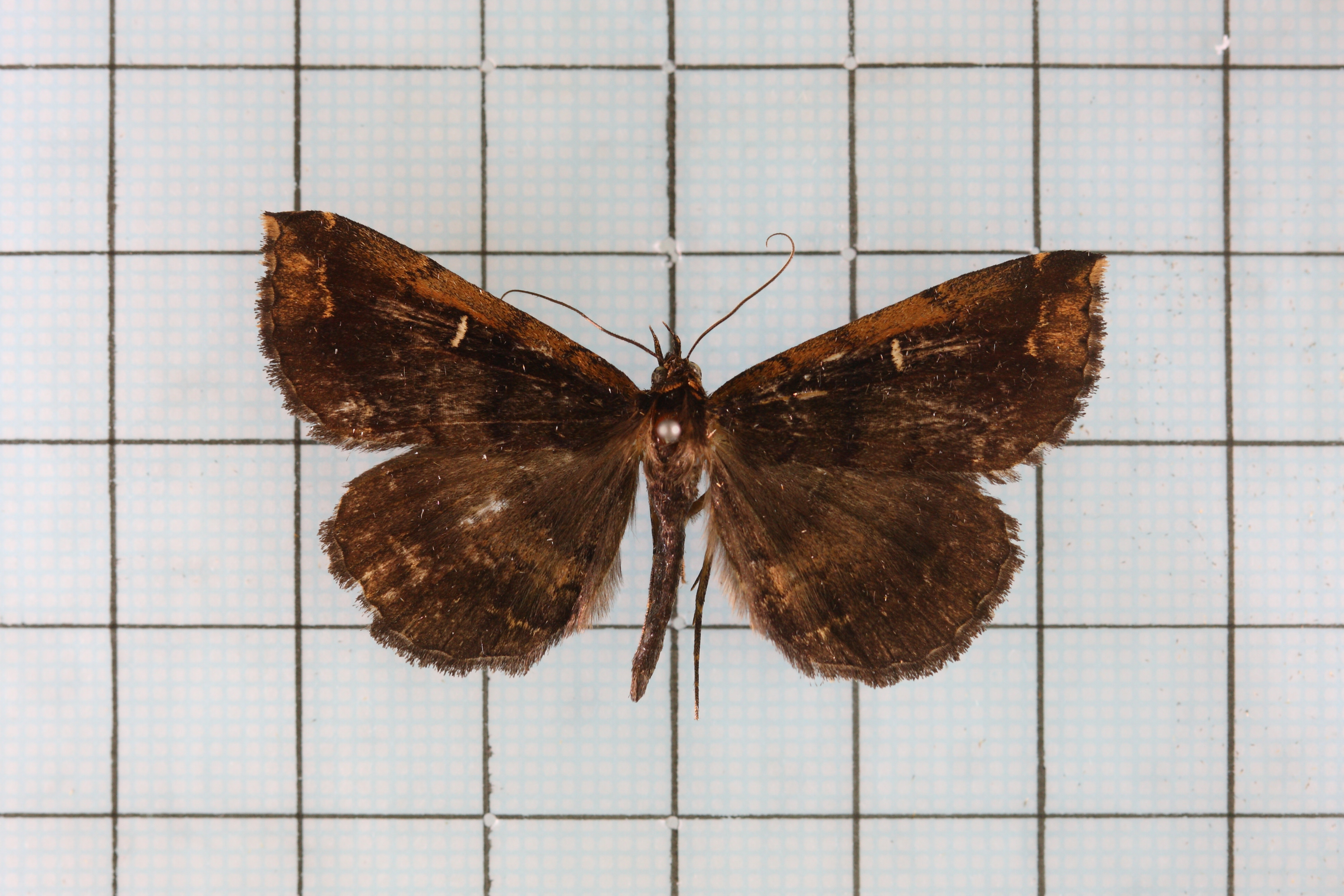

Scientific classification
- Domain: Eukaryota
- Kingdom: Animalia
- Phylum: Arthropoda
- Class: Insecta
- Order: Lepidoptera
- Superfamily: Noctuoidea
- Family: Erebidae
- Subfamily: Herminiinae
- Genus: Hadennia; Moore, [1885]

Synonyms
- Wilkara C. Swinhoe, 1918

= Hadennia =

Genus of moths

Hadennia is a genus of moths of the family Erebidae. The genus was erected by Frederic Moore in 1885.

== Species ==
- Hadennia angustifascia Holloway, 2008 Borneo, Sumatra, Java
- Hadennia emmelodes (Bethune-Baker, 1908) New Guinea
- Hadennia harmani Holloway, 2008 Borneo, Peninsular Malaysia
- Hadennia hisbonalis (Walker, [1859]) north-eastern Hiamalayas, Taiwan, Peninsular Malaysia, Sumatra, Borneo
- Hadennia hypenalis (Walker, [1859]) India, Sri Lanka, Taiwan, Peninsular Malaysia, Sumatra, Borneo
- Hadennia incompleta (Prout, 1928) Borneo, Thailand
- Hadennia incongruens (Butler, 1878) Japan, Korea, south-eastern Siberia
- Hadennia jutalis (Walker, [1859]) Sri Lanka, Myanmar, Andaman Islands
- Hadennia kimae Holloway, 2008 Borneo
- Hadennia maculifascia (Hampson, 1895) Myanmar, Thailand, Peninsular Malaysia, Singapore, Java, Borneo
- Hadennia mysalis (Walker, 1859) Sri Lanka, Japan, Taiwan, Myanmar, Thailand, Andamans, Borneo
- Hadennia nakatanii Owada, 1979 Japan
- Hadennia nigerrima (C. Swinhoe, 1918) Nias, Borneo, Thailand
- Hadennia obliqua (Wileman, 1911) Japan
- Hadennia ochreistigma (Hampson, 1895) Myanmar
- Hadennia pallifascia Holloway, 1976 Borneo
- Hadennia purifascia Prout, 1932 Sumatra
- Hadennia subapicibrunnea Holloway, 1976 Borneo, Buru
- Hadennia suttoni Holloway, 2008 Borneo
- Hadennia transvestita Holloway, 2008 Borneo
