= Hypercalymnia =

Scientific classification
- Kingdom: Animalia
- Phylum: Arthropoda
- Class: Insecta
- Order: Lepidoptera
- Superfamily: Noctuoidea
- Family: Noctuidae
- Subfamily: Acontiinae
- Genus: Hypercalymnia; Hampson, 1909

Synonyms
- Sculptifrontia Berio, 1966

Genus of moths

Hypercalymnia is a genus of moths of the family Noctuidae. The genus was erected by George Hampson in 1909.

Afromoths treats this taxon as a subgenus of Acontia Ochsenheimer, 1816.

== Species ==
- Hypercalymnia ampijoroa Viette, 1965 Madagascar
- Hypercalymnia gloriosa (Kenrick, 1917) Madagascar
- Hypercalymnia hausmanni (Hacker, 2010) Kenya
- Hypercalymnia laurenconi Viette, 1965 Madagascar
- Hypercalymnia malagasy Viette, 1965 Madagascar
- Hypercalymnia metaxantha Hampson, 1910 Zaire, Rwanda, Tanzania
- Hypercalymnia splendida (Rothschild, 1924) Madagascar
- Hypercalymnia transducta (Viette, 1958) Madagascar
- Hypercalymnia versicolorata (Hacker, 2010) Kenya, Ethiopia
- Hypercalymnia paphos Viette, 1973 Madagascar
- Hypercalymnia viridivariegata Berio, 1939 Ethiopia
