= Huebnerius =

Scientific classification
- Kingdom: Animalia
- Phylum: Arthropoda
- Clade: Pancrustacea
- Class: Insecta
- Order: Lepidoptera
- Superfamily: Noctuoidea
- Family: Erebidae
- Subfamily: Calpinae
- Genus: Huebnerius (Saalmüller, 1891)
- Species: H. dux

Binomial name
- Huebnerius dux (Saalmüller, 1881)

Synonyms
- Generic: Phyllodes Saalmüller, 1881; Specific: Phyllodes dux Saalmüller, 1881; Phyllodes proetexatus (Mabille, 1882)

Genus of moths

Huebnerius is a monotypic moth genus of the family Erebidae. Its only species, Huebnerius dux, is found in Madagascar. Both the genus and species were first described by Max Saalmüller, the genus in 1891 and the species ten years earlier in 1881.

The big head of this species is similar to the Sphingidae. Their antennae are light brown and have half the length of the forewings. The abdomen is greyish black, the forewings greyish black-brown. The hindwings are black brown at their base with an edge of one-fifth of the wing in bright yellow. The underside of wings is whitish grey yellow.

It has a wingspan of 100 mm (male) to 107 mm (female).

Saalmüller described this species from a couple from the collection of the museum of Lübeck.
