= Herpeperas =

Scientific classification
- Kingdom: Animalia
- Phylum: Arthropoda
- Class: Insecta
- Order: Lepidoptera
- Superfamily: Noctuoidea
- Family: Erebidae
- Subfamily: Calpinae
- Genus: Herpeperas; Hampson, 1926

Genus of moths

Herpeperas is a genus of moths of the family Erebidae. The genus was erected by George Hampson in 1926.

== Species ==
- Herpeperas amaniensis Pinhey, 1956 Tanzania
- Herpeperas atra Viette, 1962 Madagascar
- Herpeperas atrapex Hampson, 1926 Ghana
- Herpeperas barnesi Pinhey, 1968 southern Africa, Zimbabwe, Tanzania
- Herpeperas excurvata Gaede, 1940 Fernando Po
- Herpeperas griseoapicata Gaede, 1940 western Africa
- Herpeperas lavendula Hampson, 1926 southern Nigeria
- Herpeperas phoenopasta Hampson, 1926 southern Nigeria
- Herpeperas rectalis Gaede, 1940 Malawi
- Herpeperas rudis (Walker, 1865) Sierra Leone, Gambia, southern Africa
- Herpeperas tanda Viette, 1962 Madagascar
- Herpeperas violaris Hampson, 1926 Malawi, Zambia, Zimbabwe
