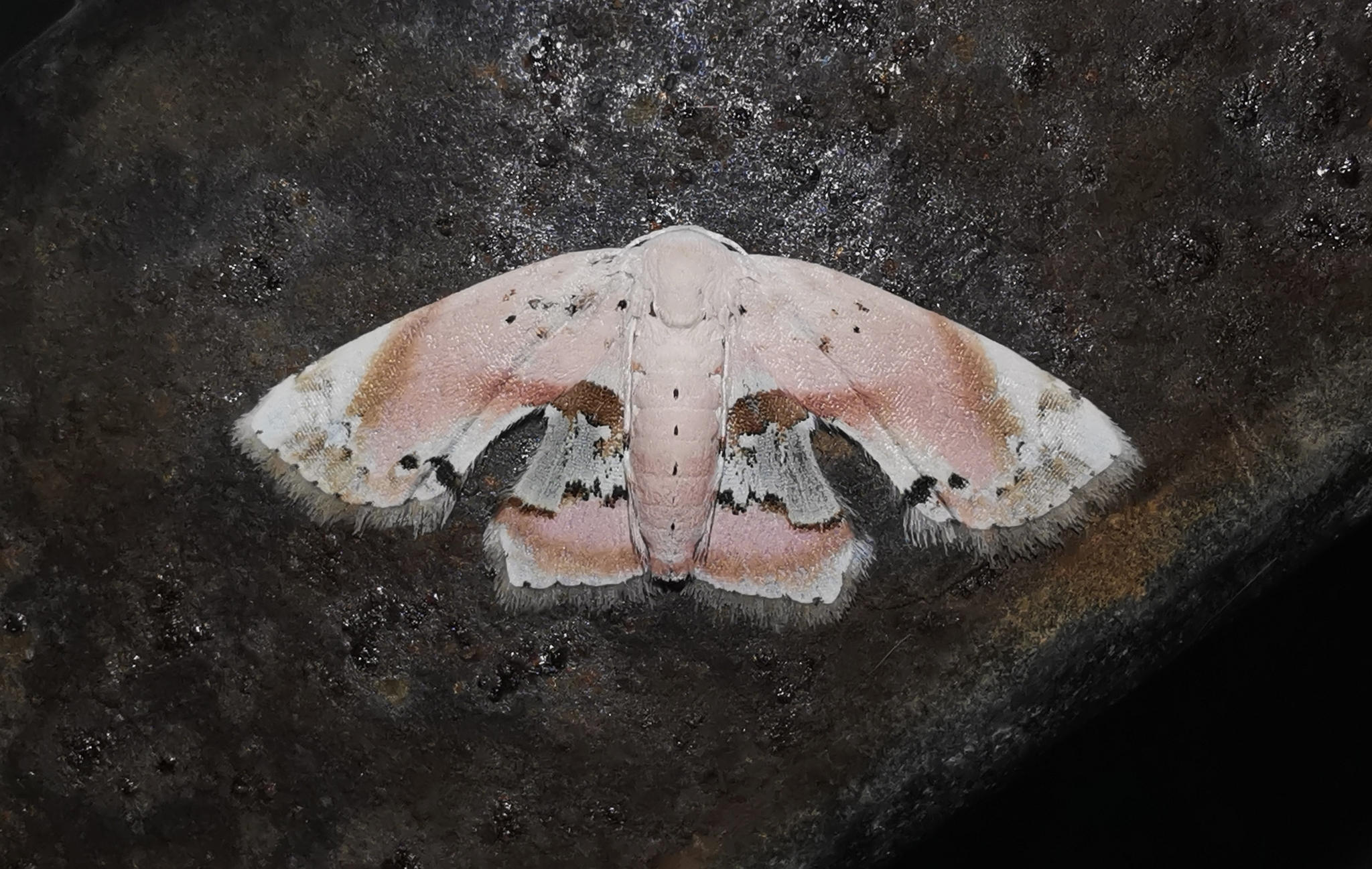
- Holocryptis erubescens

Scientific classification
- Domain: Eukaryota
- Kingdom: Animalia
- Phylum: Arthropoda
- Class: Insecta
- Order: Lepidoptera
- Superfamily: Noctuoidea
- Family: Noctuidae
- Subfamily: Acontiinae
- Genus: Holocryptis; T. P. Lucas, 1893

Synonyms
- Troctoptera Hampson, 1893

= Holocryptis =

Genus of moths

Holocryptis is a genus of moths of the family Noctuidae erected by Thomas Pennington Lucas in 1893.

== Description ==
Palpi slender and porrect (extending forward). Antennae simple, with thickened basal joint. Thorax and abdomen scaled. Forewings with somewhat lobed inner margin towards base. Vein 5 from above angle of cell, and veins 7, 8 and 9 stalked. Hindwings with costa excised before apex. Veins 3 and 4 stalked, and veins 6 and 7 from upper angle of cell.

== Species ==
- Holocryptis albida Hampson, 1918
- Holocryptis atrifusa Hampson 1910
- Holocryptis bisectalis Walker 1859
- Holocryptis erosides (Hampson, 1902)
- Holocryptis erubescens (Hampson, 1893)
- Holocryptis figurata Warren 1913
- Holocryptis interrogationis Viette, 1957
- Holocryptis melanosticta Hampson, 1910
- Holocryptis neavei D. S. Fletcher, 1961
- Holocryptis nymphula Rebel, 1909
- Holocryptis permaculata Hampson, 1910
- Holocryptis phasianura T. P. Lucas, 1892
- Holocryptis ussuriensis (Rebel, 1901)
