= Hypobarathra =

Scientific classification
- Kingdom: Animalia
- Phylum: Arthropoda
- Class: Insecta
- Order: Lepidoptera
- Superfamily: Noctuoidea
- Family: Noctuidae
- Tribe: Hadenini
- Genus: Hypobarathra; Hampson, 1905

Genus of moths

Hypobarathra is a genus of moths of the family Noctuidae.

== Species ==
- Hypobarathra icterias (Eversmann, 1843)
- Hypobarathra repetita (Butler, 1889)
