= Haemabasis =

Scientific classification
- Kingdom: Animalia
- Phylum: Arthropoda
- Class: Insecta
- Order: Lepidoptera
- Superfamily: Noctuoidea
- Family: Noctuidae (?)
- Subfamily: Catocalinae
- Genus: Haemabasis; Hampson, 1913

Genus of moths

Haemabasis is a genus of moths of the family Erebidae. The genus was erected by George Hampson in 1913.

== Species ==
- Haemabasis calodesma Rothschild, 1905
- Haemabasis continua Walker, 1862
- Haemabasis pulchrifascia Hulstaert, 1924
