= Hemichloridia =

Scientific classification
- Kingdom: Animalia
- Phylum: Arthropoda
- Class: Insecta
- Order: Lepidoptera
- Superfamily: Noctuoidea
- Family: Erebidae
- Subfamily: Calpinae
- Genus: Hemichloridia; Hampson, 1926
- Species: H. euprepia

Binomial name
- Hemichloridia euprepia Hampson, 1902

Genus of moths

Hemichloridia is a monotypic moth genus of the family Erebidae. Its only species, Hemichloridia euprepia, is found in India and Sri Lanka. Both the genus and species were first described by George Hampson, the genus in 1926 and the species 24 years earlier in 1902.
