= Heterographa =

Scientific classification
- Domain: Eukaryota
- Kingdom: Animalia
- Phylum: Arthropoda
- Class: Insecta
- Order: Lepidoptera
- Superfamily: Noctuoidea
- Family: Noctuidae
- Genus: Heterographa; Staudinger, 1877

Genus of moths

Heterographa is a genus of moths of the family Noctuidae.

== Species ==
- Heterographa fabrilis (Püngeler, 1909)
- Heterographa sibirica Staudinger, 1896
- Heterographa tetrastigma Brandt, 1941
- Heterographa thoenyi Ronkay, Varga & Gyulai, 2002
- Heterographa tumulorum Boursin, 1936
- Heterographa zelleri (Christoph, 1877)
