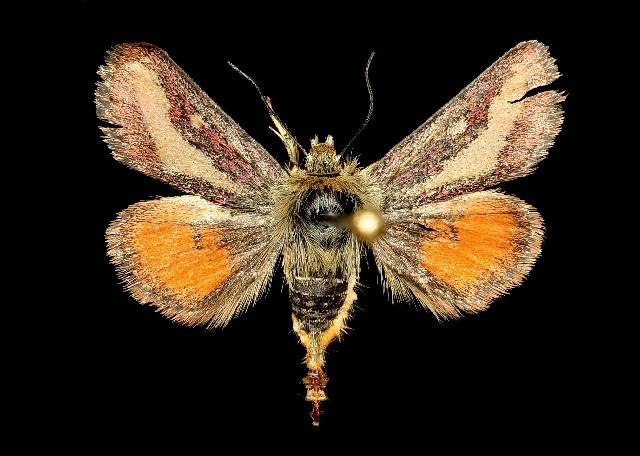

Scientific classification
- Kingdom: Animalia
- Phylum: Arthropoda
- Class: Insecta
- Order: Lepidoptera
- Superfamily: Noctuoidea
- Family: Noctuidae
- Subfamily: Heliothinae
- Genus: Heliolonche; Grote, 1873

Synonyms
- Heliosea Grote, 1875

= Heliolonche =

Genus of moths

Heliolonche is a genus of moths of the family Noctuidae.

== Species ==
- Heliolonche carolus McDunnough, 1936
- Heliolonche celeris (Grote, 1873)
- Heliolonche joaquinensis Hardwick, 1996
- Heliolonche modicella Grote, 1873
- Heliolonche pictipennis (Grote, 1875)
