= Hypenomorpha =

Scientific classification
- Kingdom: Animalia
- Phylum: Arthropoda
- Clade: Pancrustacea
- Class: Insecta
- Order: Lepidoptera
- Superfamily: Noctuoidea
- Family: Erebidae
- Subfamily: Hypeninae
- Genus: Hypenomorpha; Sugi, 1977

Genus of moths

Hypenomorpha is a genus of moths of the family Erebidae erected by Shigero Sugi in 1977. Both species are known from Japan.

== Species ==
- Hypenomorpha calamina (Butler, 1879)
- Hypenomorpha falcipennis (Inoue, 1958)
