= Hiaspis =

Scientific classification
- Kingdom: Animalia
- Phylum: Arthropoda
- Class: Insecta
- Order: Lepidoptera
- Superfamily: Noctuoidea
- Family: Erebidae
- Subfamily: Hypeninae
- Genus: Hiaspis; Walker, 1866

Type species
- Hiaspis closteroides Walker, 1866

Genus of moths

Hiaspis is a genus of moths of the family Erebidae.

== Species ==
Some species of this genus are:

- Hiaspis apicalis (Swinhoe, 1904) (Borneo)
- Hiaspis closteroides Walker, 1866 (Borneo & West-Malaysia)
- Hiaspis fuscobrunnea (Hampson, 1895) (Bhutan & Ceylon)
