= Hypogrammodes =

Scientific classification
- Kingdom: Animalia
- Phylum: Arthropoda
- Class: Insecta
- Order: Lepidoptera
- Superfamily: Noctuoidea
- Family: Noctuidae (?)
- Subfamily: Catocalinae
- Genus: Hypogrammodes; Hampson, 1913

Genus of moths

Hypogrammodes is a genus of moths of the family Noctuidae. The genus was erected by George Hampson in 1913.

== Species ==
- Hypogrammodes aeolia H. Druce, 1890
- Hypogrammodes balma Guenée, 1852
- Hypogrammodes confusa Butler, 1878
- Hypogrammodes feronia Felder, 1874
- Hypogrammodes glaucoides Schaus, 1906
- Hypogrammodes micropis Hampson, 1913
- Hypogrammodes ocellata Maassen, 1890
- Hypogrammodes subocellata Schaus, 1906
