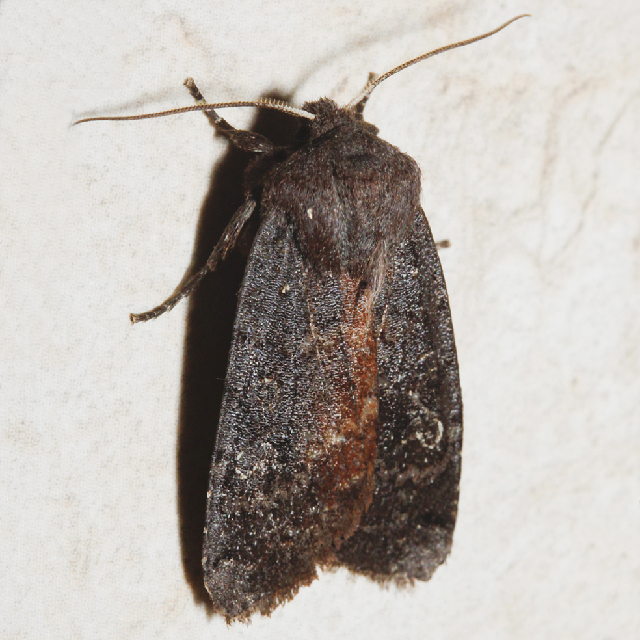

Scientific classification
- Domain: Eukaryota
- Kingdom: Animalia
- Phylum: Arthropoda
- Class: Insecta
- Order: Lepidoptera
- Superfamily: Noctuoidea
- Family: Noctuidae
- Subtribe: Xylenina
- Genus: Homoglaea; Morrison, 1876

= Homoglaea =

Genus of moths

Homoglaea is a genus of moths of the family Noctuidae.

== Species ==
- Homoglaea californica (Smith, 1891)
- Homoglaea carbonaria (Harvey, 1876)
- Homoglaea dives Smith, 1907
- Homoglaea hircina Morrison, 1876
- Homoglaea variegata Barnes & McDunnough, 1918
