= Hygrostola =

Scientific classification
- Kingdom: Animalia
- Phylum: Arthropoda
- Class: Insecta
- Order: Lepidoptera
- Superfamily: Noctuoidea
- Family: Noctuidae
- Genus: Hygrostola; Warren, 1913

Genus of moths

Hygrostola is a genus of moths of the family Noctuidae described by Warren in 1913.

== Species ==
- Hygrostola homomunda D. S. Fletcher, 1961
- Hygrostola robusta (Hampson, 1894)
