= Hypsiforma =

Scientific classification
- Domain: Eukaryota
- Kingdom: Animalia
- Phylum: Arthropoda
- Class: Insecta
- Order: Lepidoptera
- Superfamily: Noctuoidea
- Family: Erebidae
- Subfamily: Calpinae
- Genus: Hypsiforma; Oberthür, 1923

Synonyms
- Lepidopalpia Hampson, 1926

Genus of moths

Hypsiforma is a genus of moths of the family Erebidae. The genus was first described by Oberthür in 1923. The species are found on Madagascar.

== Species ==
- Hypsiforma bicolor (Mabille, 1879)
- Hypsiforma concolora (Swinhoe, 1903)
- Hypsiforma hypsoides (Butler, 1879)
- Hypsiforma lambertoni Oberthür, 1923
- Hypsiforma toulgoeti Viette, 1987
