= Helionycta =

Scientific classification
- Kingdom: Animalia
- Phylum: Arthropoda
- Clade: Pancrustacea
- Class: Insecta
- Order: Lepidoptera
- Superfamily: Noctuoidea
- Family: Erebidae
- Subfamily: Calpinae
- Genus: Helionycta; Köhler, 1979
- Species: H. grisea

Binomial name
- Helionycta grisea Köhler, 1979

Genus of moths

Helionycta is a monotypic moth genus of the family Erebidae. Its only species, Helionycta grisea, is found in Bolivia. Both the genus and the species were first described by Köhler in 1979.
