= Heteropygas =

Scientific classification
- Kingdom: Animalia
- Phylum: Arthropoda
- Class: Insecta
- Order: Lepidoptera
- Superfamily: Noctuoidea
- Family: Erebidae
- Subfamily: Calpinae
- Genus: Heteropygas; Guenée, 1852

Genus of moths

Heteropygas is a genus of moths of the family Erebidae. The genus was erected by Achille Guenée in 1852.

== Species ==
- Heteropygas albicauda Köhler, 1979
- Heteropygas angulum Giacomelli, 1911
- Heteropygas biangulata Walker, 1865
- Heteropygas dognini Giacomelli, 1911
- Heteropygas filena Schaus, 1901
- Heteropygas nymbides Hampson, 1926
- Heteropygas oppilata Guenée, 1852
- Heteropygas ziczac Felder, 1874
