= Hypenopsis =

Scientific classification
- Kingdom: Animalia
- Phylum: Arthropoda
- Class: Insecta
- Order: Lepidoptera
- Superfamily: Noctuoidea
- Family: Erebidae
- Subfamily: Hypenodinae
- Genus: Hypenopsis; Dyar, 1913

Species
- Hypenopsis calusa; Hypenopsis galapagensis; Hypenopsis macula; Hypenopsis sonora

Genus of moths

Hypenopsis is a genus of moths in the subfamily Hypenodinae. It was previously part of Schrankia.
