= Heraema =

Scientific classification
- Domain: Eukaryota
- Kingdom: Animalia
- Phylum: Arthropoda
- Class: Insecta
- Order: Lepidoptera
- Superfamily: Noctuoidea
- Family: Noctuidae
- Genus: Heraema; Staudinger, 1892

Genus of moths

Heraema is a genus of moths of the family Noctuidae.

== Species ==
- Heraema mandschurica (Graeser, 1890)
