= Haritalopha =

Scientific classification
- Kingdom: Animalia
- Phylum: Arthropoda
- Class: Insecta
- Order: Lepidoptera
- Superfamily: Noctuoidea
- Family: Erebidae
- Subfamily: Calpinae
- Genus: Haritalopha; Hampson, 1895

Genus of moths

Haritalopha is a genus of moths of the family Erebidae. The genus was erected by George Hampson in 1895.

== Species ==
- Haritalopha biparticolor Hampson, 1895 Bhutan
- Haritalopha indentalis (Wileman, 1915) Taiwan
