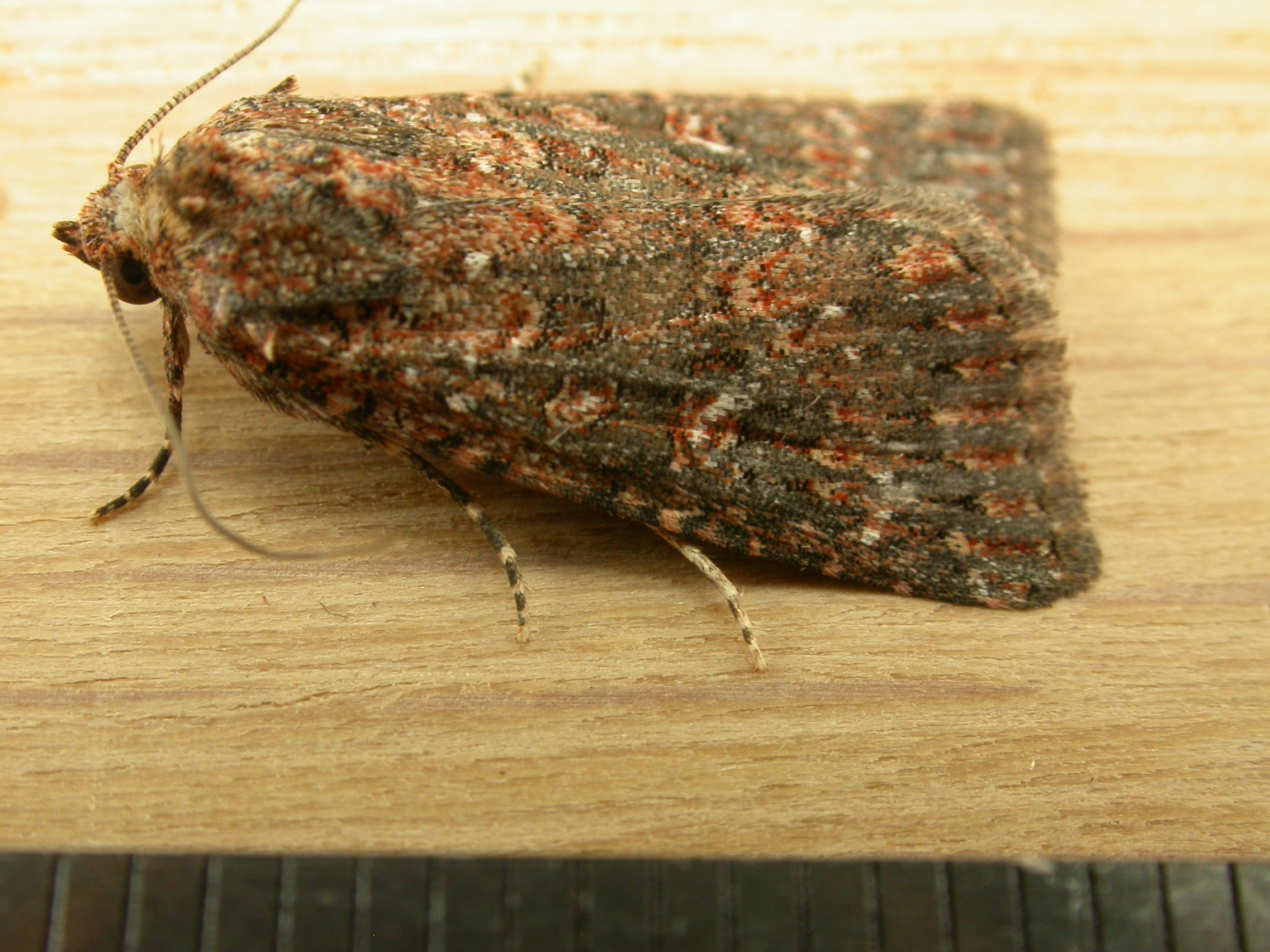
- Hypoperigea tonsa

Scientific classification
- Kingdom: Animalia
- Phylum: Arthropoda
- Class: Insecta
- Order: Lepidoptera
- Superfamily: Noctuoidea
- Family: Noctuidae
- Subfamily: Condicinae
- Genus: Hypoperigea; Hampson, 1908

= Hypoperigea =

Genus of moths

Hypoperigea is a genus of moths of the family Noctuidae.

== Species ==
- Hypoperigea lunulata Holloway, 1979
- Hypoperigea medionota Hampson, 1920
- Hypoperigea tonsa (Guenée, 1852)
- Hypoperigea turpis (Walker, [1858])
