= Obana =

Scientific classification
- Kingdom: Animalia
- Phylum: Arthropoda
- Class: Insecta
- Order: Lepidoptera
- Superfamily: Noctuoidea
- Family: Noctuidae
- Subfamily: Acontiinae
- Genus: Obana; Walker, 1862

Synonyms
- Vittappressa Bethune-Baker, 1906; Hypobleta Turner, 1908

Genus of moths

Obana is a genus of moths of the family Erebidae. The genus was erected by Francis Walker in 1862.

== Taxonomy ==
The Global Lepidoptera Names Index and Butterflies and Moths of the World put this genus in the family Noctuidae.

== Species ==
- Obana berioi (Hacker, Fiebig & Stadie, 2019) Ethiopia
- Obana biformis (Hacker, Fiebig & Stadie, 2019) Madagascar
- Obana cerynoides (Hacker, 2019) Gabon
- Obana dinawa (Bethune-Baker, 1906) New Guinea
- Obana fascicola (Hacker, 2019) Tanzania, Zimbabwe
- Obana fatua (Viette, 1962) Madagascar
- Obana festiva (Viette, 1962) Madagascar
- Obana gloriosa (Viette, 1956) Madagascar
- Obana plagiostola (Hampson, 1896) Bhutan
- Obana pusillana (Hacker, Fiebig & Stadie, 2019) Madagascar
- Obana rufiplaga (Bethune-Baker, 1906) New Guinea
- Obana solomonensis Warren, 1913 Solomons
- Obana vagipennata Walker, 1862 Borneo, New Guinea, Queensland
- Obana viettei (Berio, 1954) Madagascar, Cameroon, Kenya, Uganda, Tanzania, South Africa
- Obana viridicincta (Viette, 1956) Madagascar
