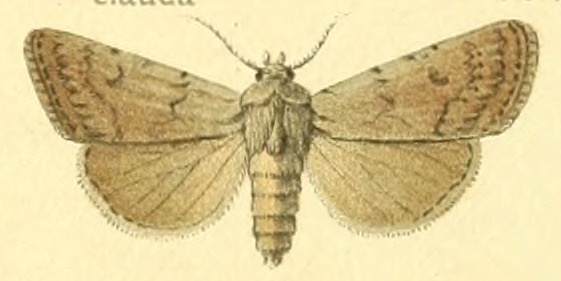
- The largest butterflies of the earth

Scientific classification
- Kingdom: Animalia
- Phylum: Arthropoda
- Class: Insecta
- Order: Lepidoptera
- Superfamily: Noctuoidea
- Family: Noctuidae
- Genus: Hemiexarnis; Boursin, 1948

= Hemiexarnis =

Genus of insects

Hemiexarnis is a genus of moths of the family Noctuidae.

== Selected species ==
- Hemiexarnis berezskii
- Hemiexarnis moechilla (Püngeler, 1906)
- Hemiexarnis nivea
- Hemiexarnis peperida
