= Pitara =

Scientific classification
- Kingdom: Animalia
- Phylum: Arthropoda
- Class: Insecta
- Order: Lepidoptera
- Superfamily: Noctuoidea
- Family: Erebidae
- Subfamily: Calpinae
- Genus: Pitara; Walker, 1858

Genus of moths

Pitara is a genus of moths of the family Erebidae. The genus was erected by Francis Walker in 1858.

== Species ==
- Pitara congressa (Walker, 1858) Venezuela
- Pitara subaracuata Walker, 1865 Sierra Leone
- Pitara subcosta Walker, 1858 Brazil (Amazonas)
