= Herpoperasa =

Scientific classification
- Kingdom: Animalia
- Phylum: Arthropoda
- Class: Insecta
- Order: Lepidoptera
- Superfamily: Noctuoidea
- Family: Erebidae
- Subfamily: Calpinae
- Genus: Herpoperasa; Hampson, 1926
- Species: H. apicata

Binomial name
- Herpoperasa apicata (Dognin, 1912)

Synonyms
- Ephyrodes apicata Dognin, 1912

Genus of moths

Herpoperasa is a genus of moths of the family Erebidae erected by George Hampson in 1926. Its only species, Herpoperasa apicata, was first described by Paul Dognin in 1912. It is found in Bolivia.
