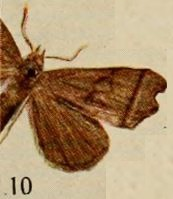
- Hondryches avakubi

Scientific classification
- Domain: Eukaryota
- Kingdom: Animalia
- Phylum: Arthropoda
- Class: Insecta
- Order: Lepidoptera
- Superfamily: Noctuoidea
- Family: Erebidae
- Subfamily: Calpinae
- Genus: Hondryches; Nye, 1975

Synonyms
- Rhynchodes Guenee, 1852

= Hondryches =

Genus of moths

Hondryches is a genus of moths of the family Noctuidae.

== Species ==
- Hondryches ambrensis (Viette, 1972)
- Hondryches avakubi (Holland, 1920)
- Hondryches efulensis (Holland, 1920)
- Hondryches gueneei (Viette, 1966)
- Hondryches incertana Viette, 1958)
- Hondryches odontographa (Gaede, 1939)
- Hondryches phalaeniformis (Guenee, 1852)
- Hondryches problematica (Viette, 1958)
- Hondryches tessemanni Gaede, 1939
