= Armadini =

Scientific classification
- Domain: Eukaryota
- Kingdom: Animalia
- Phylum: Arthropoda
- Class: Insecta
- Order: Lepidoptera
- Superfamily: Noctuoidea
- Family: Noctuidae
- Subfamily: Acontiinae
- Tribe: Armadini

Tribe of moths

The Armadini are a noctuid ("owlet") moth tribe of the subfamily Acontiinae. As numerous related genera have not yet been assigned to a tribe, the genus list should be considered preliminary.

== Genera ==
- Armada Staudinger, 1884
- Asplenia Hampson, 1916
- Drasteriodes Hampson, 1926
- Iranada Wiltshire, 1977
- Metopistis Warren, 1913
- Metoponrhis Staudinger, 1888
- Riadhia Wiltshire, 1961
- Tarachephia Hampson, 1926
