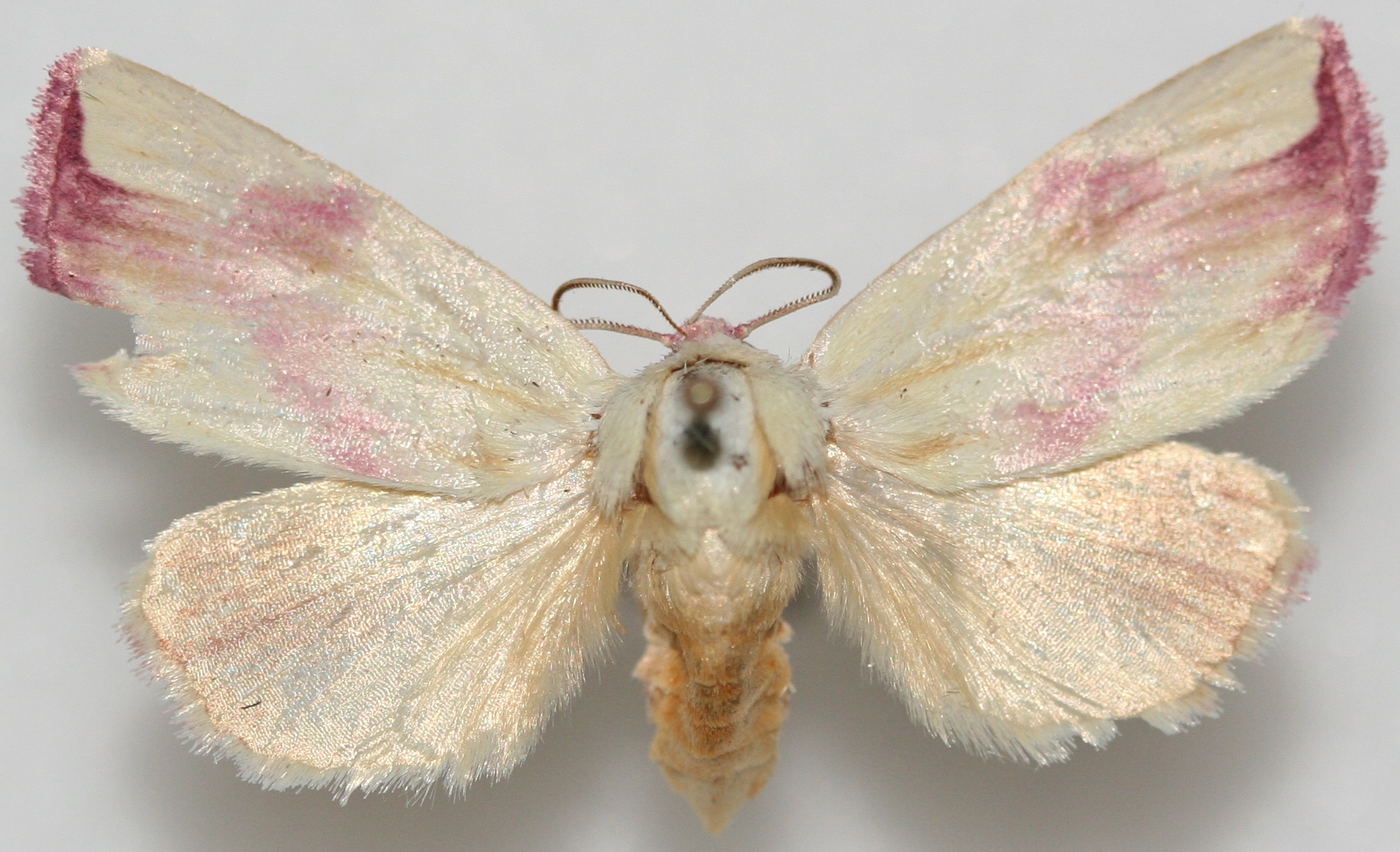
- Thurberiphaga diffusa

Scientific classification
- Domain: Eukaryota
- Kingdom: Animalia
- Phylum: Arthropoda
- Class: Insecta
- Order: Lepidoptera
- Superfamily: Noctuoidea
- Family: Noctuidae
- Subfamily: Acontiinae
- Tribe: Chamaecleini
- Genus: Hemioslaria; Barnes & Benjamin, 1924
- Species: H. pima

Binomial name
- Hemioslaria pima Barnes & Benjamin, 1924

Synonyms
- Alaria diffusa Barnes, 1904; Thurberiphaga catalina Dyar, [1920]

= Thurberiphaga =

Genus of moths

Thurberiphaga is a monotypic moth genus of the family Noctuidae erected by Harrison Gray Dyar Jr. in 1920. Its only species, Thurberiphaga diffusa, was first described by William Barnes in 1904.

== Distribution ==
Thurberiphaga diffusa can be found only in southern Arizona in the United States.

== Flight ==
This moth is on wing from July to September.

== Life cycle ==
The caterpillar bores into the stem of the host plant. It is a pinkish color and is covered with rough setae.

== Host plants ==
Its only host plant is wild cotton (Gossypium thurberi).
