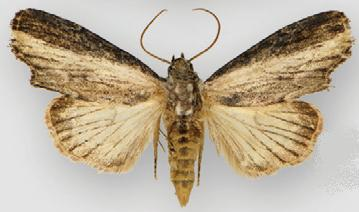
- Trogotorna persecta

Scientific classification
- Kingdom: Animalia
- Phylum: Arthropoda
- Class: Insecta
- Order: Lepidoptera
- Superfamily: Noctuoidea
- Family: Noctuidae
- Subfamily: Acontiinae
- Tribe: Chamaecleini
- Genus: Trogotorna; Hampson, 1910

= Trogotorna =

Genus of moths

Trogotorna is a monotypic moth genus of the family Noctuidae. Its only species, Trogotorna persecta, is found in South America, including Brazil. Both the genus and species were first described by George Hampson in 1910.

Adults are on wing in January, April and December.
