= Riadhia =

Scientific classification
- Kingdom: Animalia
- Phylum: Arthropoda
- Class: Insecta
- Order: Lepidoptera
- Superfamily: Noctuoidea
- Family: Noctuidae
- Subfamily: Acontiinae
- Genus: Riadhia; Wiltshire, 1961
- Species: R. diehli

Binomial name
- Riadhia diehli Wiltshire, 1961

Genus of moths

Riadhia is a monotypic moth genus of the family Noctuidae. Its only species, Riadhia diehli, is found in Saudi Arabia and the United Arab Emirates. Both the genus and species were first described by Wiltshire in 1961.
