= Asplenia melanodonta =

Scientific classification
- Kingdom: Animalia
- Phylum: Arthropoda
- Class: Insecta
- Order: Lepidoptera
- Superfamily: Noctuoidea
- Family: Noctuidae
- Subfamily: Acontiinae
- Tribe: Armadini
- Genus: Asplenia; Hampson, 1916
- Species: A. melanodonta

Binomial name
- Asplenia melanodonta (Hampson, 1896)

Synonyms
- Species synonymy: Asplenia buranensis Prout; Asplenia erffai Grünberg, 1913; Asplenia erffai subsp. chloridina Hampson, 1926; Asplenia ethiopica Hampson, 1909; Asplenia melanodonta subsp. erffai (Grünberg, 1913)

Species of moth

Asplenia melanodonta is the only species in the monotypic moth genus Asplenia of the family Noctuidae. The species is found in Africa. Both the genus and the species were first described by George Hampson, the genus in 1916 and the species in 1896.

The subspecies Asplenia melanodonta chloridina is sometimes recognized as a species of this genus.
