= Rabila frontalis =

Scientific classification
- Kingdom: Animalia
- Phylum: Arthropoda
- Class: Insecta
- Order: Lepidoptera
- Superfamily: Noctuoidea
- Family: Noctuidae
- Genus: Rabila
- Species: R. frontalis

Binomial name
- Rabila frontalis Walker, 1865

Species of moth

Rabila frontalis, the red bollworm, is a moth of the family Noctuidae. The species was first described by Francis Walker in 1865. It is found in India and Sri Lanka.

Its larval food plant is cotton. Larvae are parasitized by Bracon species.
