= Chamaeclea basiochrea =

Scientific classification
- Domain: Eukaryota
- Kingdom: Animalia
- Phylum: Arthropoda
- Class: Insecta
- Order: Lepidoptera
- Superfamily: Noctuoidea
- Family: Noctuidae
- Genus: Chamaeclea
- Species: C. basiochrea

Binomial name
- Chamaeclea basiochrea Barnes & McDunnough, 1916

Species of moth

Chamaeclea basiochrea is a species of moth in the family Noctuidae (the owlet moths). It was first described by William Barnes and James Halliday McDunnough in 1916 and it is found in North America.

The MONA or Hodges number for Chamaeclea basiochrea is 9790.
