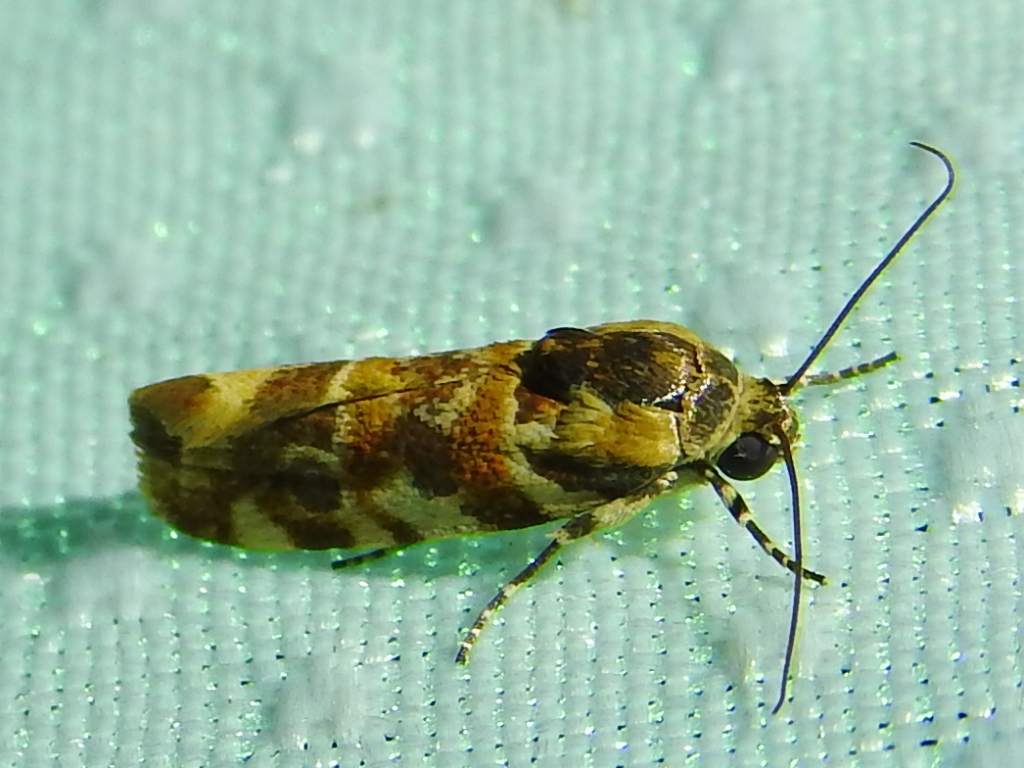

Scientific classification
- Kingdom: Animalia
- Phylum: Arthropoda
- Clade: Pancrustacea
- Class: Insecta
- Order: Lepidoptera
- Superfamily: Noctuoidea
- Family: Noctuidae
- Genus: Spragueia
- Species: S. jaguaralis

Binomial name
- Spragueia jaguaralis Hampson, 1910

= Spragueia jaguaralis =

Species of moth

Spragueia jaguaralis is a species of bird dropping moth in the family Noctuidae. It was described by George Hampson in 1910 and is found in North America.
