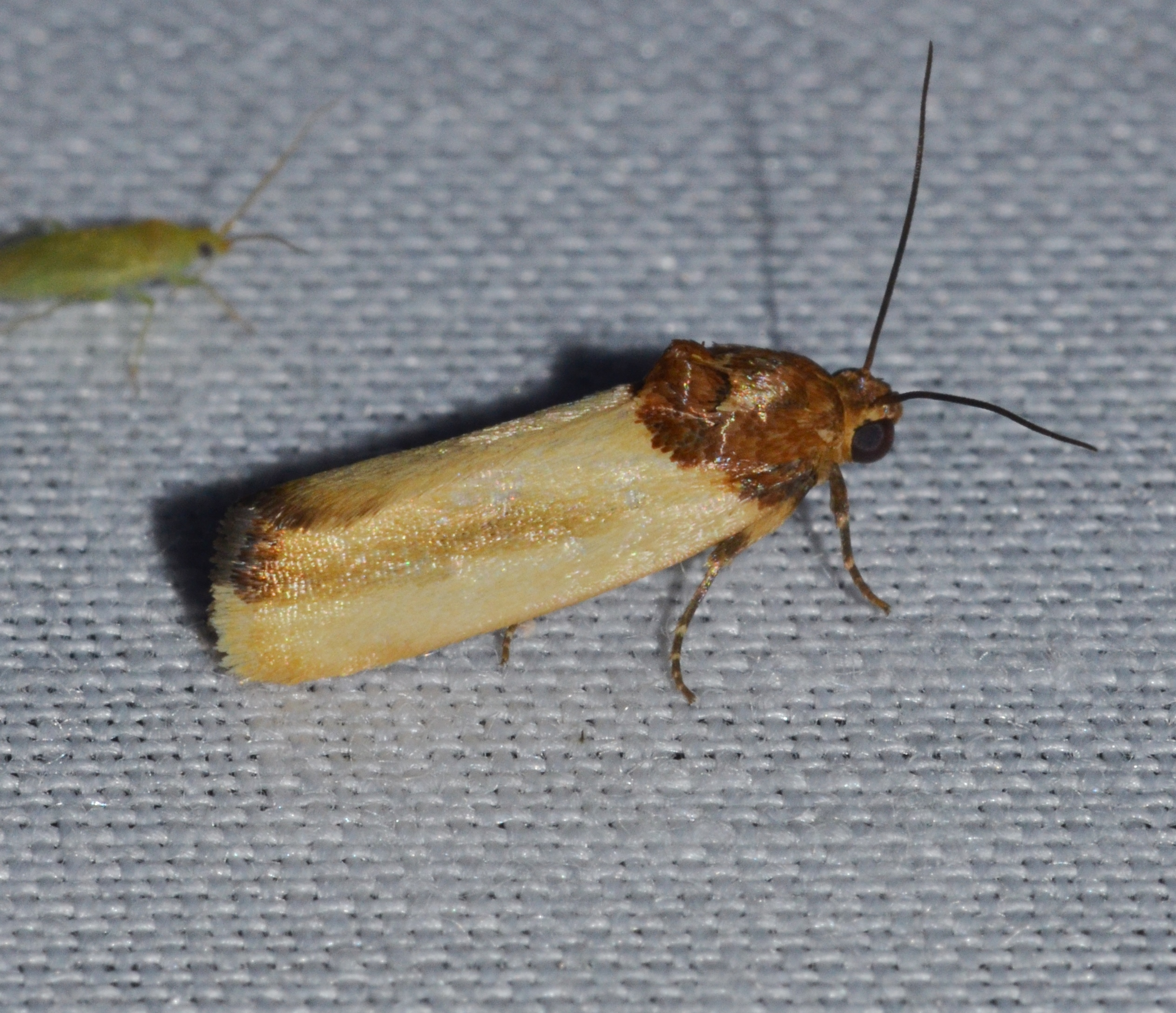

Scientific classification
- Domain: Eukaryota
- Kingdom: Animalia
- Phylum: Arthropoda
- Class: Insecta
- Order: Lepidoptera
- Superfamily: Noctuoidea
- Family: Noctuidae
- Genus: Spragueia
- Species: S. apicalis

Binomial name
- Spragueia apicalis Herrich-Schäffer, 1868

Synonyms
- Emmelia apicalis Herrich-Schäffer, 1868; Mnesipyrga trichostrota Meyrick, 1913; Fruva accepta H. Edwards, 1881; Agrophila truncatula Zeller, 1873; Heliocontia obliquella Strand, 1912

= Spragueia apicalis =

Species of moth

Spragueia apicalis, the yellow spragueia, is a moth of the family Noctuidae. The species was first described by Gottlieb August Wilhelm Herrich-Schäffer in 1868. It is also found in North America (including Alabama, Arkansas, Florida, Georgia, Illinois, Kansas, Kentucky, Louisiana, Maryland, Mississippi, Missouri, North Carolina, Ohio, Oklahoma, South Carolina, Tennessee and Texas), Central America (including El Salvador and Costa Rica), Cuba and Peru.

The wingspan is about 16 mm for females and 17 mm for males. Adults are sexually dimorphic.

The larvae have been recorded feeding on Gutierrezia sarothrae.
