= Spragueia cleta =

Scientific classification
- Domain: Eukaryota
- Kingdom: Animalia
- Phylum: Arthropoda
- Class: Insecta
- Order: Lepidoptera
- Superfamily: Noctuoidea
- Family: Noctuidae
- Tribe: Acontiini
- Genus: Spragueia
- Species: S. cleta

Binomial name
- Spragueia cleta (Druce, 1889)

Species of moth

Spragueia cleta is a species of bird dropping moth in the family Noctuidae.

The MONA or Hodges number for Spragueia cleta is 9123.
