= Rabila =

Scientific classification
- Kingdom: Animalia
- Phylum: Arthropoda
- Class: Insecta
- Order: Lepidoptera
- Superfamily: Noctuoidea
- Family: Noctuidae
- Subfamily: Acontiinae
- Genus: Rabila; Walker, 1865

Genus of moths

Rabila is a genus of moths of the family Noctuidae erected by Francis Walker in 1865. The genus was once thought to endemic to Sri Lanka, but species have been found from South India and few African countries.

== Description ==
Its eyes are naked and without lashes. The proboscis is obsolete. Palpi porrect (extending forward) and evenly scaled. Third joint long and frons with a rounded corneous projection. Antennae of male simple with short branches. Thorax and abdomen without tufts and tibia lack spines. Neuration normal. Forewings with produced and rounded apex, where the outer angle slightly hooked.

== Species ==
- Rabila albiviridis Hampson, 1916
- Rabila frontalis Walker, 1865
