= Duhemia =

Scientific classification
- Domain: Eukaryota
- Kingdom: Animalia
- Phylum: Arthropoda
- Class: Insecta
- Order: Lepidoptera
- Superfamily: Noctuoidea
- Family: Noctuidae
- Subfamily: Acontiinae
- Genus: Duhemia; Rungs, 1943
- Species: D. variegata

Binomial name
- Duhemia variegata Lucas, 1932

Synonyms
- Jugurthia variegata D. Lucas, 1932; Duhemia metachrostina Rungs, 1942

Genus of moths

Duhemia is a monotypic moth genus of the family Noctuidae erected by Charles E. Rungs in 1942. Its only species, Duhemia variegata, was first described by Daniel Lucas in 1932. The species is found in Morocco.
