= Mimoruza =

Scientific classification
- Kingdom: Animalia
- Phylum: Arthropoda
- Class: Insecta
- Order: Lepidoptera
- Superfamily: Noctuoidea
- Family: Noctuidae
- Subfamily: Acontiinae
- Genus: Mimoruza; Hampson, 1895
- Species: M. nigriceps

Binomial name
- Mimoruza nigriceps Hampson, 1895

Genus of moths

Mimoruza is a monotypic moth genus of the family Noctuidae. Its only species, Mimoruza nigriceps, is found in the Indian state of Sikkim. Both the genus and species were first described by George Hampson in 1895.
