= Metoponrhis =

Scientific classification
- Domain: Eukaryota
- Kingdom: Animalia
- Phylum: Arthropoda
- Class: Insecta
- Order: Lepidoptera
- Superfamily: Noctuoidea
- Family: Noctuidae
- Subfamily: Acontiinae
- Genus: Metoponrhis; Staudinger, 1888

Genus of moths

Metoponrhis is a genus of moths of the family Noctuidae. The genus was described by Staudinger in 1888.

== Species ==
- Metoponrhis albirena Christoph, 1887
- Metoponrhis karakumensis Gerasimov, 1931
- Metoponrhis marginata Hampson, 1898
- Metoponrhis rungsi Lucas, 1936
