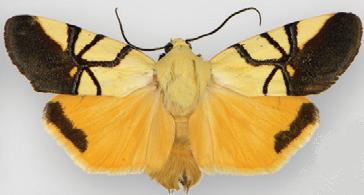

Scientific classification
- Domain: Eukaryota
- Kingdom: Animalia
- Phylum: Arthropoda
- Class: Insecta
- Order: Lepidoptera
- Superfamily: Noctuoidea
- Family: Noctuidae
- Genus: Eusceptis
- Species: E. flavifrimbriata

Binomial name
- Eusceptis flavifrimbriata Todd, 1971

= Eusceptis flavifrimbriata =

Species of moth

Eusceptis flavifrimbriata is a moth of the family Noctuidae first described by Todd in 1971. It is found in Mexico.
