= Trissernis =

Scientific classification
- Kingdom: Animalia
- Phylum: Arthropoda
- Class: Insecta
- Order: Lepidoptera
- Superfamily: Noctuoidea
- Family: Noctuidae
- Subfamily: Acontiinae
- Genus: Trissernis; Meyrick, 1902

Synonyms
- Bryomima Turner, 1902

Genus of moths

Trissernis is a genus of moths of the family Noctuidae. The genus was erected by Edward Meyrick in 1902.

== Species ==
- Trissernis greeni Holloway, 1977
- Trissernis ochrochlora Turner, 1902
- Trissernis prasinoscia Meyrick, 1902
