= Parerastria =

Scientific classification
- Domain: Eukaryota
- Kingdom: Animalia
- Phylum: Arthropoda
- Class: Insecta
- Order: Lepidoptera
- Superfamily: Noctuoidea
- Family: Noctuidae
- Subfamily: Acontiinae
- Genus: Parerastria; Warren, 1914
- Species: P. castaneata

Binomial name
- Parerastria castaneata Warren, 1914

Synonyms
- Generic: Dumigania Turner, 1933; Specific: Dumigania iochlora Turner, 1933

Genus of moths

Parerastria is a monotypic moth genus of the family Noctuidae. Its only species, Parerastria castaneata, is found in the Australian states of Queensland and New South Wales. Both the species and the genus were first described by Warren in 1914.
