= Stenocryptis =

Scientific classification
- Domain: Eukaryota
- Kingdom: Animalia
- Phylum: Arthropoda
- Class: Insecta
- Order: Lepidoptera
- Superfamily: Noctuoidea
- Family: Noctuidae
- Subfamily: Acontiinae
- Genus: Stenocryptis; Warren, 1913
- Species: S. punctata

Binomial name
- Stenocryptis punctata Warren, 1913

Genus of moths

Stenocryptis is a monotypic moth genus of the family Noctuidae. Its only species, Stenocryptis punctata, is found in the Khasi Hills of north-eastern India. Both the genus and species were first described by Warren in 1913.
