= Aleptinoides =

Scientific classification
- Kingdom: Animalia
- Phylum: Arthropoda
- Class: Insecta
- Order: Lepidoptera
- Superfamily: Noctuoidea
- Family: Noctuidae
- Subfamily: Acontiinae
- Tribe: Chamaecleini
- Genus: Aleptinoides; Barnes & McDunnough, 1912
- Species: A. ochrea

Binomial name
- Aleptinoides ochrea Barnes & McDunnough, 1912

Genus of moths

Aleptinoides is a monotypic moth genus of the family Noctuidae comprising a single species, Aleptinoides ochrea. Both the genus and species were described by William Barnes and James Halliday McDunnough in 1912.
