= Heterorta =

Scientific classification
- Domain: Eukaryota
- Kingdom: Animalia
- Phylum: Arthropoda
- Class: Insecta
- Order: Lepidoptera
- Superfamily: Noctuoidea
- Family: Noctuidae
- Subfamily: Acontiinae
- Genus: Heterorta; Warren, 1913
- Species: H. plutonis

Binomial name
- Heterorta plutonis (T. P. Lucas, 1894)

Synonyms
- Thalpochares plutonis Lucas; Micraeschus pyrrhantha Meyrick, 1902; Micraeschus diacaustus Turner, 1902

Genus of moths

Heterorta is a monotypic moth genus of the family Noctuidae described by Warren in 1913. Its only species, Heterorta plutonis, was first described by Thomas Pennington Lucas in 1894. The species is known from Australia where it has been found in Queensland, New South Wales and Victoria.

Herbison-Evans, Don & Crossley, Stella (29 August 2020). "Heterorta plutonis (T.P. Lucas, 1895)". Australian Caterpillars and their Butterflies and Moths.
