= Spragueia guttata =

Scientific classification
- Kingdom: Animalia
- Phylum: Arthropoda
- Class: Insecta
- Order: Lepidoptera
- Superfamily: Noctuoidea
- Family: Noctuidae
- Genus: Spragueia
- Species: S. guttata

Binomial name
- Spragueia guttata Grote, 1875

Species of moth

Spragueia guttata, the spotted spragueia, is a species of bird dropping moth in the family Noctuidae. It is found in North America.

The MONA or Hodges number for Spragueia guttata is 9125.
