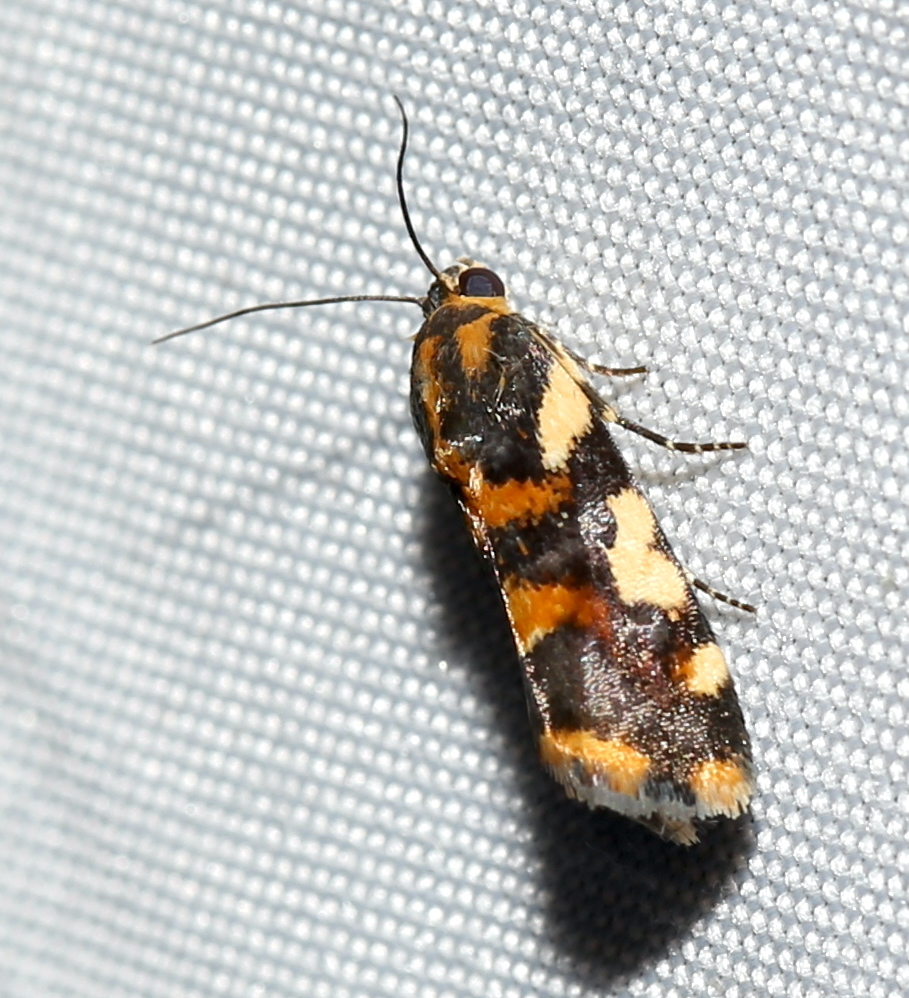

Scientific classification
- Kingdom: Animalia
- Phylum: Arthropoda
- Clade: Pancrustacea
- Class: Insecta
- Order: Lepidoptera
- Superfamily: Noctuoidea
- Family: Noctuidae
- Tribe: Acontiini
- Genus: Spragueia
- Species: S. dama

Binomial name
- Spragueia dama (Guenée, 1852)

= Spragueia dama =

Species of moth

Spragueia dama, the southern spragueia moth, is a bird dropping moth in the family Noctuidae. The species was first described by Achille Guenée in 1852. It is found in North America.

The MONA or Hodges number for Spragueia dama is 9122.
