= Spragueia pantherula =

Scientific classification
- Kingdom: Animalia
- Phylum: Arthropoda
- Class: Insecta
- Order: Lepidoptera
- Superfamily: Noctuoidea
- Family: Noctuidae
- Genus: Spragueia
- Species: S. pantherula

Binomial name
- Spragueia pantherula (Herrich-Schäffer, 1868)

Synonyms
- Emmelia pantherula Herrich-Schäffer, 1868; Emmelia uncinula Herrich-Schäffer, 1868

Species of moth

Spragueia pantherula is a moth of the family Noctuidae. It was first described by Gottlieb August Wilhelm Herrich-Schäffer in 1868 and is found on Cuba.
