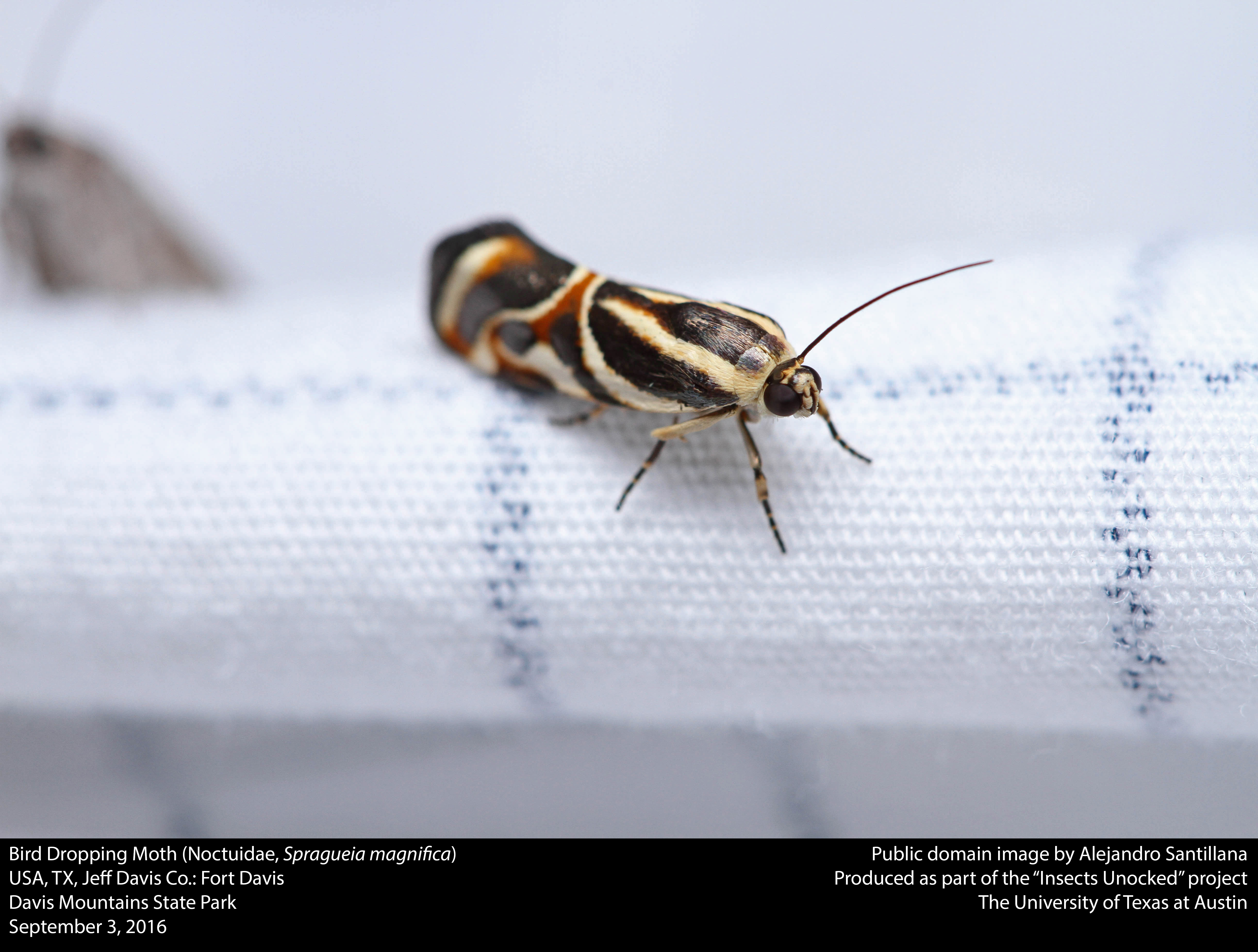

Scientific classification
- Kingdom: Animalia
- Phylum: Arthropoda
- Class: Insecta
- Order: Lepidoptera
- Superfamily: Noctuoidea
- Family: Noctuidae
- Genus: Spragueia
- Species: S. magnifica

Binomial name
- Spragueia magnifica Grote, 1883

= Spragueia magnifica =

Species of moth

Spragueia magnifica is a species of bird dropping moth in the family Noctuidae first described by Augustus Radcliffe Grote in 1883. It is found in North America.

The MONA or Hodges number for Spragueia magnifica is 9121.
