= Bostrodes =

Scientific classification
- Kingdom: Animalia
- Phylum: Arthropoda
- Class: Insecta
- Order: Lepidoptera
- Superfamily: Noctuoidea
- Family: Noctuidae
- Subfamily: Acontiinae
- Genus: Bostrodes; Hampson, 1910

Genus of moths

Bostrodes is a genus of moths of the family Noctuidae. The genus was erected by George Hampson in 1910.

== Species ==
- Bostrodes proleuca Hampson, 1910 Java
- Bostrodes rubrifusa (Hampson, 1907) Sri Lanka
- Bostrodes rufisecta Warren, 1912 Khasi Hills of India
- Bostrodes sagittaria Warren, 1912 Khasi Hills
- Bostrodes tenuilinea Warren, 1913 Khasi Hills
