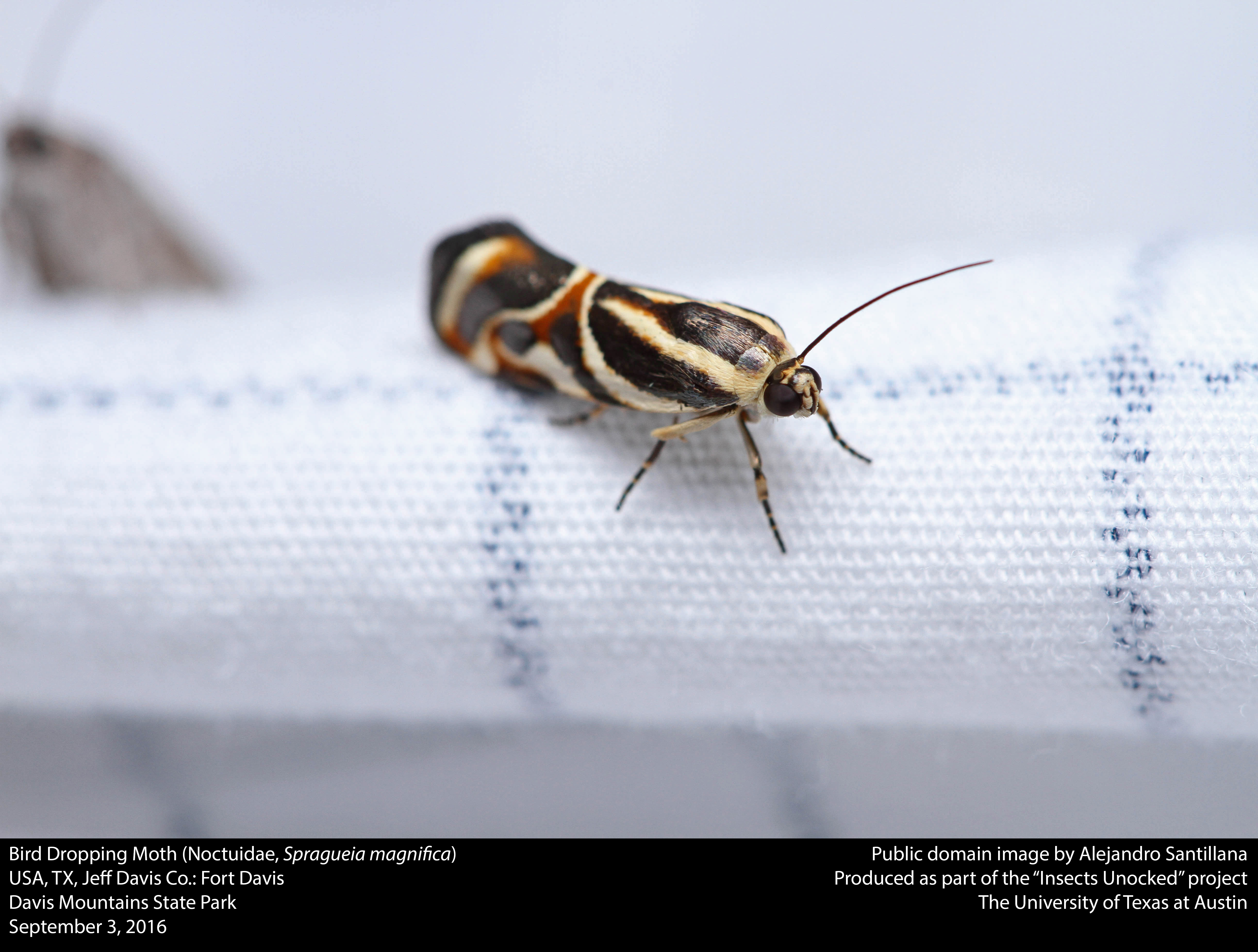
- Spragueia magnifica

Scientific classification
- Kingdom: Animalia
- Phylum: Arthropoda
- Class: Insecta
- Order: Lepidoptera
- Superfamily: Noctuoidea
- Family: Noctuidae
- Subfamily: Acontiinae
- Tribe: Acontiini
- Genus: Spragueia; Grote, 1875

Synonyms
- Heliocontia Hampson, 1910; Mnesipyrga Meyrick, 1913

= Spragueia =

Genus of moths

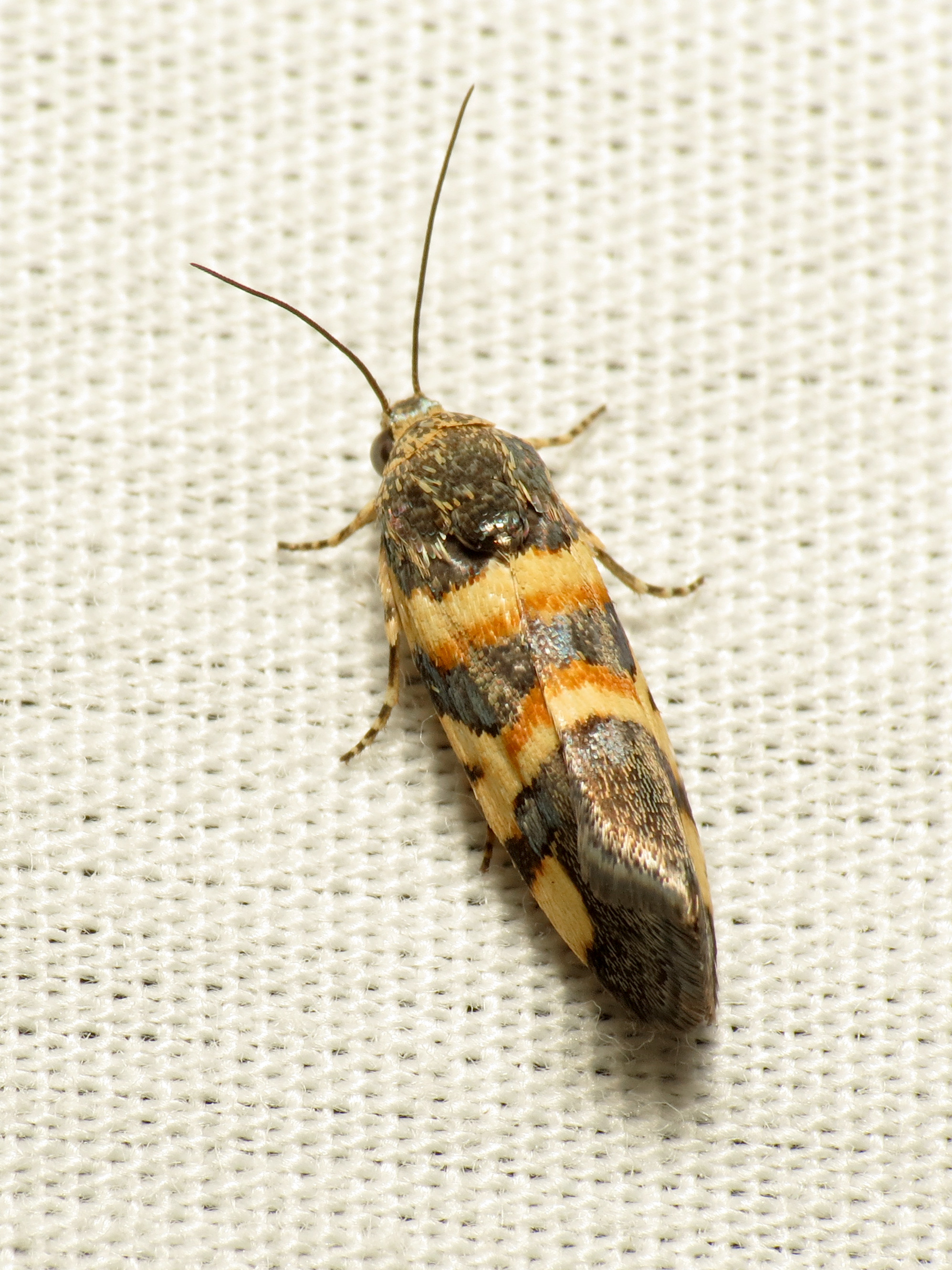
Spragueia funeralis

Spragueia is a genus of moths of the family Noctuidae. The genus was erected by Augustus Radcliffe Grote in 1875.

== Species ==
- Spragueia apicalis Herrich-Schäffer, 1868
- Spragueia basipuncta Schaus, 1914
- Spragueia cleta Druce, 1889
- Spragueia creton Schaus, 1923
- Spragueia dama Guenée, 1852
- Spragueia funeralis Grote, 1881
- Spragueia grana Dognin, 1897
- Spragueia guttata Grote, 1875
- Spragueia jaguaralis Hampson, 1910
- Spragueia leo Guenée, 1852
- Spragueia lepus Guenée, 1852
- Spragueia magnifica Grote, 1882
- Spragueia margana Fabricius, 1794 (=Spragueia cuviana (Fabricius, 1798))
- Spragueia obatra Morrison, 1875
- Spragueia onagrus Guenée, 1852
- Spragueia pantherula Herrich-Schäffer, 1868
- Spragueia perstructana Walker, 1865
- Spragueia pyralidia Schaus, 1898
- Spragueia speciosa Draudt, 1936
- Spragueia turca Köhler, 1979
- Spragueia valena Druce, 1889
