= Cingalesa =

Scientific classification
- Kingdom: Animalia
- Phylum: Arthropoda
- Class: Insecta
- Order: Lepidoptera
- Superfamily: Noctuoidea
- Family: Noctuidae
- Subfamily: Acontiinae
- Genus: Cingalesa; Hampson, 1884
- Species: C. strigicosta

Binomial name
- Cingalesa strigicosta Hampson, 1893

Genus of moths

Cingalesa is a monotypic moth genus of the family Noctuidae. Its only species, Cingalesa strigicosta, is found in Sri Lanka. Both the genus and species were first described by George Hampson, the genus in 1894 and the species in 1893.

== Description ==
Palpi upturned, where the second joint reaching vertex of head, the third joint minute. Thorax and abdomen tuftless. Forewings with vein 6 absent, veins 8 to 10 stalked. Hindwings with stalked veins 3, 4 and 6, 7.
