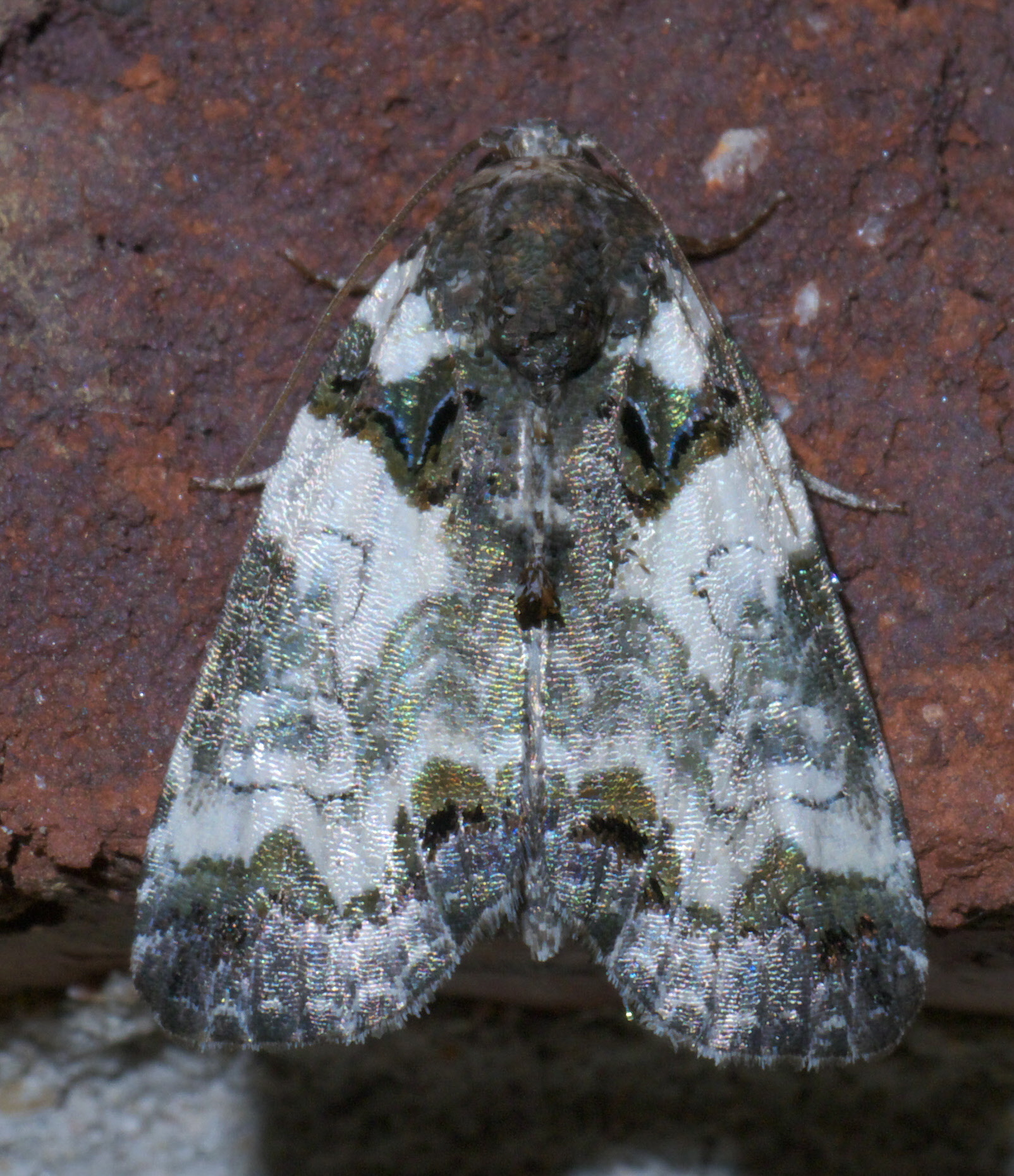

Scientific classification
- Domain: Eukaryota
- Kingdom: Animalia
- Phylum: Arthropoda
- Class: Insecta
- Order: Lepidoptera
- Superfamily: Noctuoidea
- Family: Noctuidae
- Genus: Cerma
- Species: C. cerintha

Binomial name
- Cerma cerintha (Treitschke, 1826)

= Cerma cerintha =

Species of moth

Cerma cerintha, the tufted bird dropping moth, is an owlet moth of the family Noctuidae. The species was first described by Georg Friedrich Treitschke in 1826.

The MONA or Hodges number for Cerma cerintha is 9062.

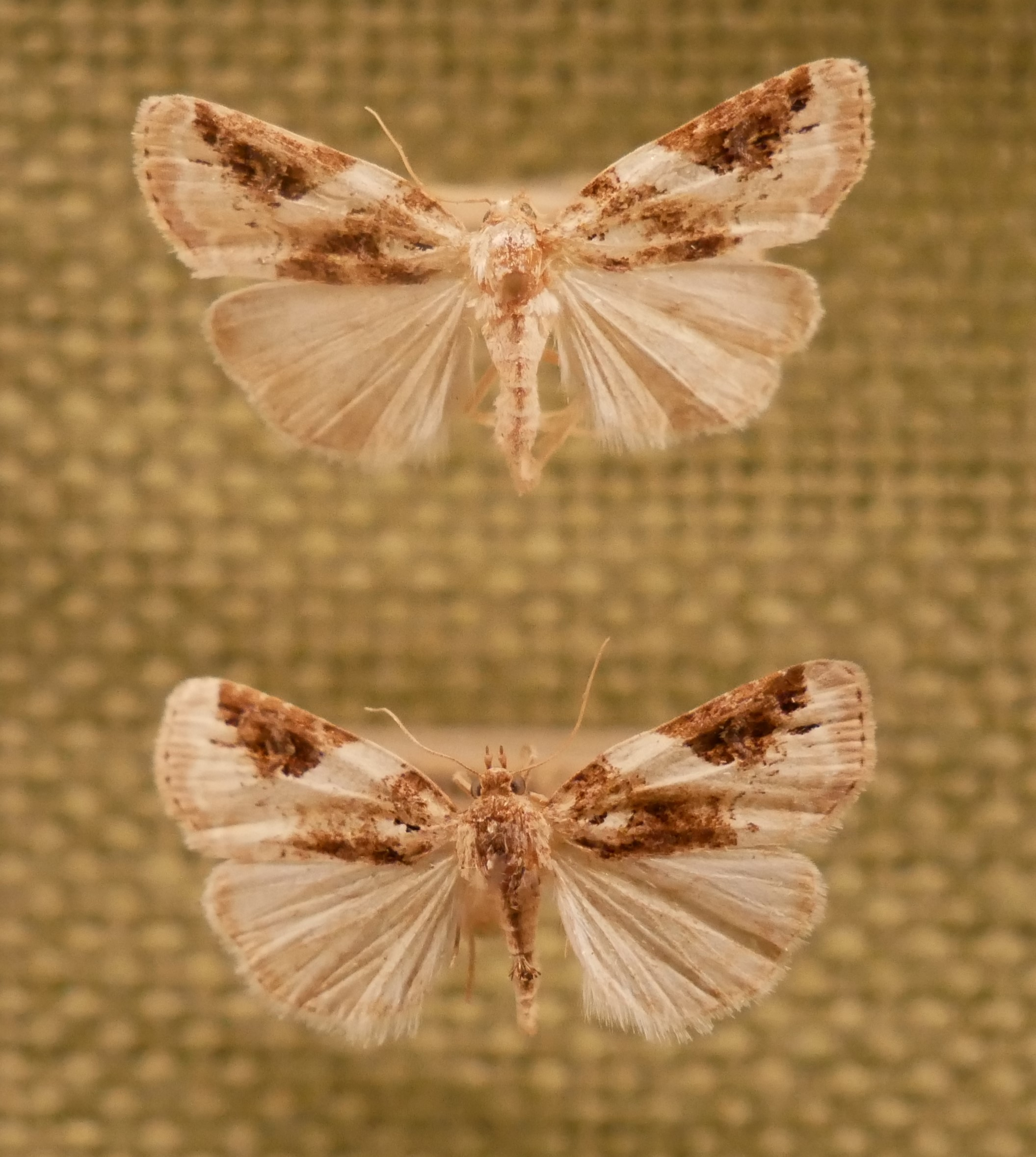
Cerma cerintha museum specimens

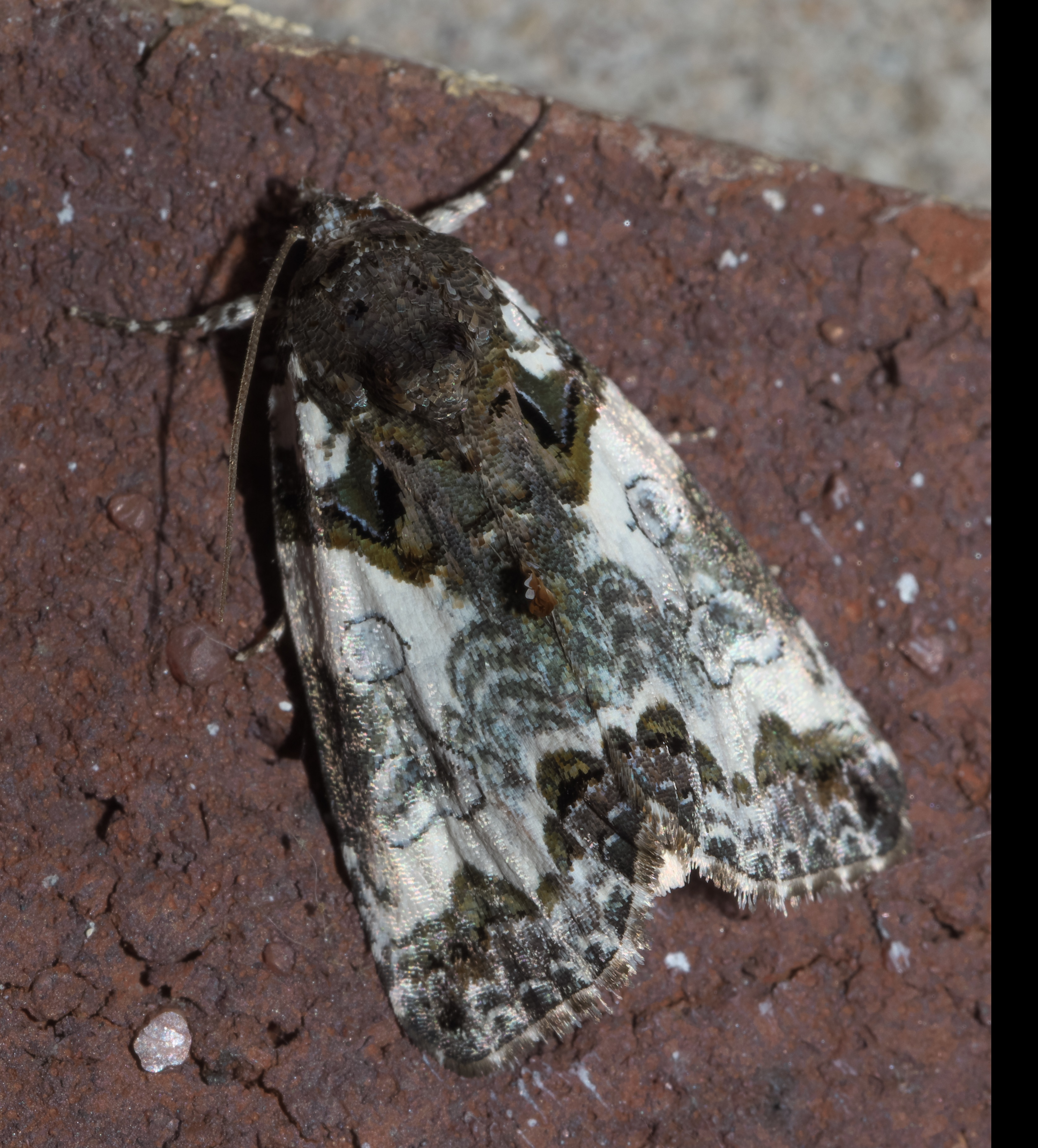
