= Heminocloa =

Scientific classification
- Domain: Eukaryota
- Kingdom: Animalia
- Phylum: Arthropoda
- Class: Insecta
- Order: Lepidoptera
- Superfamily: Noctuoidea
- Family: Noctuidae
- Subfamily: Acontiinae
- Tribe: Chamaecleini
- Genus: Heminocloa; Barnes & Benjamin, 1924
- Species: H. mirabilis

Binomial name
- Heminocloa mirabilis (Neumögen, 1884)

Genus of moths

Heminocloa is a monotypic moth genus of the family Noctuidae erected by William Barnes and Foster Hendrickson Benjamin in 1924. Its only species, Heminocloa mirabilis, was first described by Berthold Neumoegen in 1884. It is found in the US state of Arizona.
