= Outaya =

Scientific classification
- Domain: Eukaryota
- Kingdom: Animalia
- Phylum: Arthropoda
- Class: Insecta
- Order: Lepidoptera
- Superfamily: Noctuoidea
- Family: Noctuidae
- Subfamily: Acontiinae
- Genus: Outaya; Chrétien, 1911
- Species: O. grisescens

Binomial name
- Outaya grisescens Chrétien, 1911

Genus of moths

Outaya is a monotypic moth genus of the family Noctuidae. Its only species, Outaya grisescens, is found in Tunisia. Both the genus and species were first described by Pierre Chrétien in 1911.
