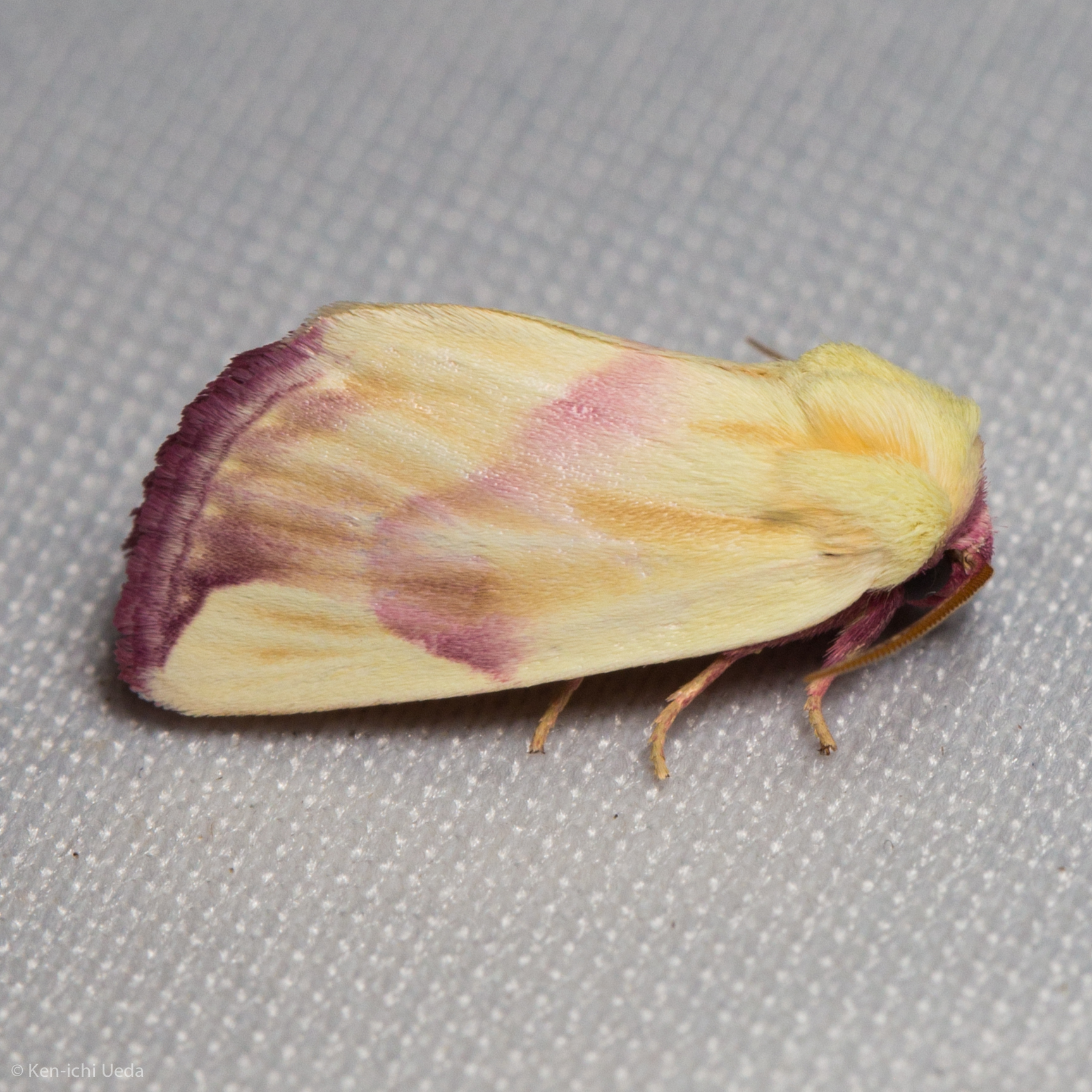
- Thurberiphaga diffusa, Arizona

Scientific classification
- Domain: Eukaryota
- Kingdom: Animalia
- Phylum: Arthropoda
- Class: Insecta
- Order: Lepidoptera
- Superfamily: Noctuoidea
- Family: Noctuidae
- Subfamily: Acontiinae
- Tribe: Chamaecleini

= Chamaecleini =

Tribe of moths

Chamaecleini is a tribe of bird dropping moths in the family Noctuidae. There are about 9 genera and 14 described species in Chamaecleini.

== Genera ==
These nine genera belong to the tribe Chamaecleini:

- Aleptinoides Barnes & McDunnough, 1912
- Austrazenia Warren, 1913
- Chalcoecia Hampson, 1908
- Chamaeclea Grote, 1883
- Heminocloa Barnes & Benjamin, 1924
- Hemioslaria Barnes & Benjamin, 1924
- Megalodes Guenee, 1852
- Thurberiphaga Dyar, 1920
- Trogotorna Hampson, 1910
