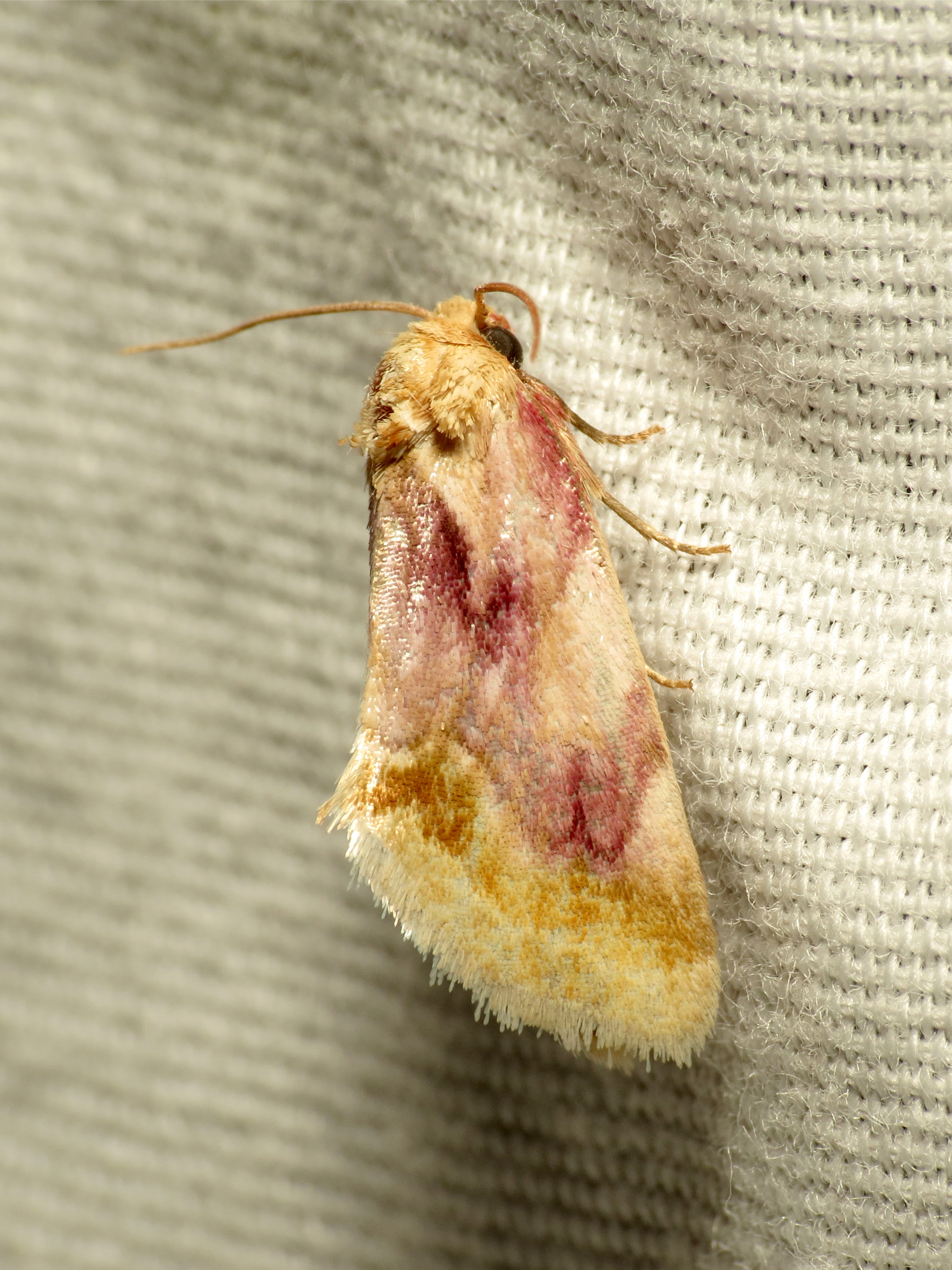
- Chamaeclea pernana

Scientific classification
- Kingdom: Animalia
- Phylum: Arthropoda
- Class: Insecta
- Order: Lepidoptera
- Superfamily: Noctuoidea
- Family: Noctuidae
- Subfamily: Acontiinae
- Tribe: Chamaecleini
- Genus: Chamaeclea; Grote, 1883

= Chamaeclea =

Genus of moths

Chamaeclea is a genus of moths of the family Noctuidae.

== Species ==
- Chamaeclea basiochrea Barnes & McDunnough, 1916
- Chamaeclea pernana (Grote, 1881)
