= Ectrogatha =

Scientific classification
- Kingdom: Animalia
- Phylum: Arthropoda
- Class: Insecta
- Order: Lepidoptera
- Superfamily: Noctuoidea
- Family: Noctuidae
- Subfamily: Acontiinae
- Genus: Ectrogatha; Hampson, 1910
- Species: E. himerata

Binomial name
- Ectrogatha himerata Walker, 1862

Genus of moths

Ectrogatha is a monotypic moth genus of the family Noctuidae erected by George Hampson in 1910. Its only species, Ectrogatha himerata, was first described by Francis Walker in 1863. It is found in the Brazilian state of Amazonas.
