= Stemmaphora =

Scientific classification
- Domain: Eukaryota
- Kingdom: Animalia
- Phylum: Arthropoda
- Class: Insecta
- Order: Lepidoptera
- Superfamily: Noctuoidea
- Family: Noctuidae
- Subfamily: Acontiinae
- Genus: Stemmaphora; Staudinger, 1888
- Species: S. viola

Binomial name
- Stemmaphora viola Staudinger, 1888

Genus of moths

Stemmaphora is a monotypic moth genus of the family Noctuidae. Its only species, Stemmaphora viola, is found in Turkmenistan, Crimea and Uzbekistan. Both the genus and species were first described by Staudinger in 1888.
