= Tarachephia =

Scientific classification
- Kingdom: Animalia
- Phylum: Arthropoda
- Class: Insecta
- Order: Lepidoptera
- Superfamily: Noctuoidea
- Family: Noctuidae
- Tribe: Armadini
- Genus: Tarachephia; Hampson, 1926
- Species: T. hueberi

Binomial name
- Tarachephia hueberi (Erschoff, 1874)

Synonyms
- Acontia hueberi Erschoff, 1874

Genus of moths

Tarachephia is a monotypic moth genus of the family Noctuidae erected by George Hampson in 1926. Its only species, Tarachephia hueberi, was first described by Nikolay Grigoryevich Erschoff in 1874. It is found in Turkestan. It is found in Syria, Iraq, Iran, the Transcaspian Region, Uzbekistan, Turkmenistan, Afghanistan and Israel.

There is one generation per year. Adults are on wing from March to May.
