= Lambana (moth) =

Scientific classification
- Kingdom: Animalia
- Phylum: Arthropoda
- Class: Insecta
- Order: Lepidoptera
- Superfamily: Noctuoidea
- Family: Noctuidae
- Subfamily: Acontiinae
- Genus: Lambana; Walker, [1866]

Synonyms
- Anablemma Schaus, 1911

Genus of moths

Lambana is a genus of moths of the family Noctuidae. The genus was erected by Francis Walker in 1866.

== Species ==
- Lambana cucullatalis Walker, [1866] Brazil (Ega)
- Lambana diagramma (Hampson, 1911) Brazil (Rio de Janeiro)
- Lambana harsha (Schaus, 1911) Costa Rica
- Lambana lebana (Schaus, 1911) Costa Rica
- Lambana necoda (Schaus, 1911) Costa Rica
- Lambana palliola (Dyar, 1914) Panama
- Lambana ziha (Schaus, 1911) Costa Rica
