= Oxytrita =

Scientific classification
- Domain: Eukaryota
- Kingdom: Animalia
- Phylum: Arthropoda
- Class: Insecta
- Order: Lepidoptera
- Superfamily: Noctuoidea
- Family: Noctuidae
- Subfamily: Acontiinae
- Genus: Oxytrita; Warren, 1913
- Species: O. bipars

Binomial name
- Oxytrita bipars (Hampson, 1907)

Synonyms
- Zagira bipars Hampson, 1907

Genus of moths

Oxytrita is a monotypic moth genus of the family Noctuidae described by Warren in 1913. Its only species, Oxytrita bipars, was first described by George Hampson in 1907. It is found in Khasis and Kanara, both in what was then British India.
