= Tephrochares =

Scientific classification
- Domain: Eukaryota
- Kingdom: Animalia
- Phylum: Arthropoda
- Class: Insecta
- Order: Lepidoptera
- Superfamily: Noctuoidea
- Family: Noctuidae
- Subfamily: Acontiinae
- Genus: Tephrochares; Zerny, 1933
- Species: T. inquinata

Binomial name
- Tephrochares inquinata (Lederer, 1857)

Synonyms
- Madopa inquinata Lederer, 1857; Thalpochares pyrami Rogenhofer, 1873

Genus of moths

Tephrochares is a monotypic moth genus of the family Noctuidae described by Zerny in 1955. Its only species, Tephrochares inquinata, was first described by Julius Lederer in 1857. It is found in Lebanon and Sicily.
