= Pyraloides =

Scientific classification
- Domain: Eukaryota
- Kingdom: Animalia
- Phylum: Arthropoda
- Class: Insecta
- Order: Lepidoptera
- Superfamily: Noctuoidea
- Family: Noctuidae
- Subfamily: Acontiinae
- Genus: Pyraloides; Rebel, 1948
- Species: P. spodia

Binomial name
- Pyraloides spodia Rebel, 1948

Genus of moths

Pyraloides is a monotypic moth genus of the family Noctuidae. Its only species, Pyraloides spodia, is found in Egypt. Both the genus and species were first described by Rebel in 1948.
