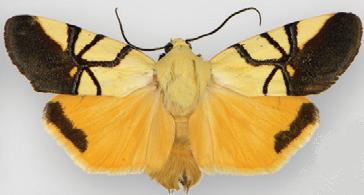
- Eusceptis flavifrimbriata

Scientific classification
- Kingdom: Animalia
- Phylum: Arthropoda
- Clade: Pancrustacea
- Class: Insecta
- Order: Lepidoptera
- Superfamily: Noctuoidea
- Family: Noctuidae
- Subfamily: Acontiinae
- Tribe: Acontiini
- Genus: Eusceptis; Hübner, 1823

= Eusceptis =

Genus of moths

Eusceptis is a genus of bird dropping moths of the family Noctuidae.

== Species ==
- Eusceptis effusa Druce, 1889
- Eusceptis extensa Strand, 1913
- Eusceptis flavifrimbriata Todd, 1971
- Eusceptis incomptilinea Todd, 1971
- Eusceptis irretita Hübner, 1823
- Eusceptis koehleri Todd, 1966
- Eusceptis lelae Todd, 1966
- Eusceptis obscura Schaus, 1898
- Eusceptis paraguayensis Draudt, 1939
- Eusceptis robertae Todd, 1966
- Eusceptis splendens Druce, 1896
