= Trogoblemma =

Scientific classification
- Kingdom: Animalia
- Phylum: Arthropoda
- Class: Insecta
- Order: Lepidoptera
- Superfamily: Noctuoidea
- Family: Noctuidae
- Subfamily: Acontiinae
- Genus: Trogoblemma; Hampson, 1910

Genus of moths

Trogoblemma is a genus of moths of the family Noctuidae. The genus was erected by George Hampson in 1910.

== Species ==
- Trogoblemma acutalis (Schaus, 1906) Brazil (São Paulo)
- Trogoblemma cacodoxica Dyar, 1914 Mexico, Costa Rica
- Trogoblemma lilacina Jones, 1915 Brazil (São Paulo)
- Trogoblemma lucens Schaus, 1914 French Guiana
- Trogoblemma modesta Schaus, 1911 Costa Rica
- Trogoblemma sericata Schaus, 1914 French Guiana
- Trogoblemma serralis Jones, 1915 Brazil (São Paulo)
