= Pseudacidalia =

Scientific classification
- Kingdom: Animalia
- Phylum: Arthropoda
- Class: Insecta
- Order: Lepidoptera
- Superfamily: Noctuoidea
- Family: Noctuidae
- Subfamily: Acontiinae
- Genus: Pseudacidalia; Hampson, 1894

Genus of moths

Pseudacidalia is a genus of moths of the family Noctuidae. The genus was erected by George Hampson in 1894.

== Species ==
- Pseudacidalia albicosta (Moore, [1885]) Sri Lanka
- Pseudacidalia fulvilinea Warren, 1913 Peninsular Malaysia
- Pseudacidalia grisea Warren, 1913 New Guinea
- Pseudacidalia undulata Hampson, 1894 Myanmar
- Pseudacidalia unilineata Bethun-Baker, 1906 New Guinea
