= Metacausta =

Scientific classification
- Kingdom: Animalia
- Phylum: Arthropoda
- Clade: Pancrustacea
- Class: Insecta
- Order: Lepidoptera
- Superfamily: Noctuoidea
- Family: Noctuidae
- Subfamily: Acontiinae
- Genus: Metacausta; Hampson, 1910
- Species: M. ustata

Binomial name
- Metacausta ustata (Hampson, 1898)

Synonyms
- Tathodelta ustata Hampson, 1898

Genus of moths

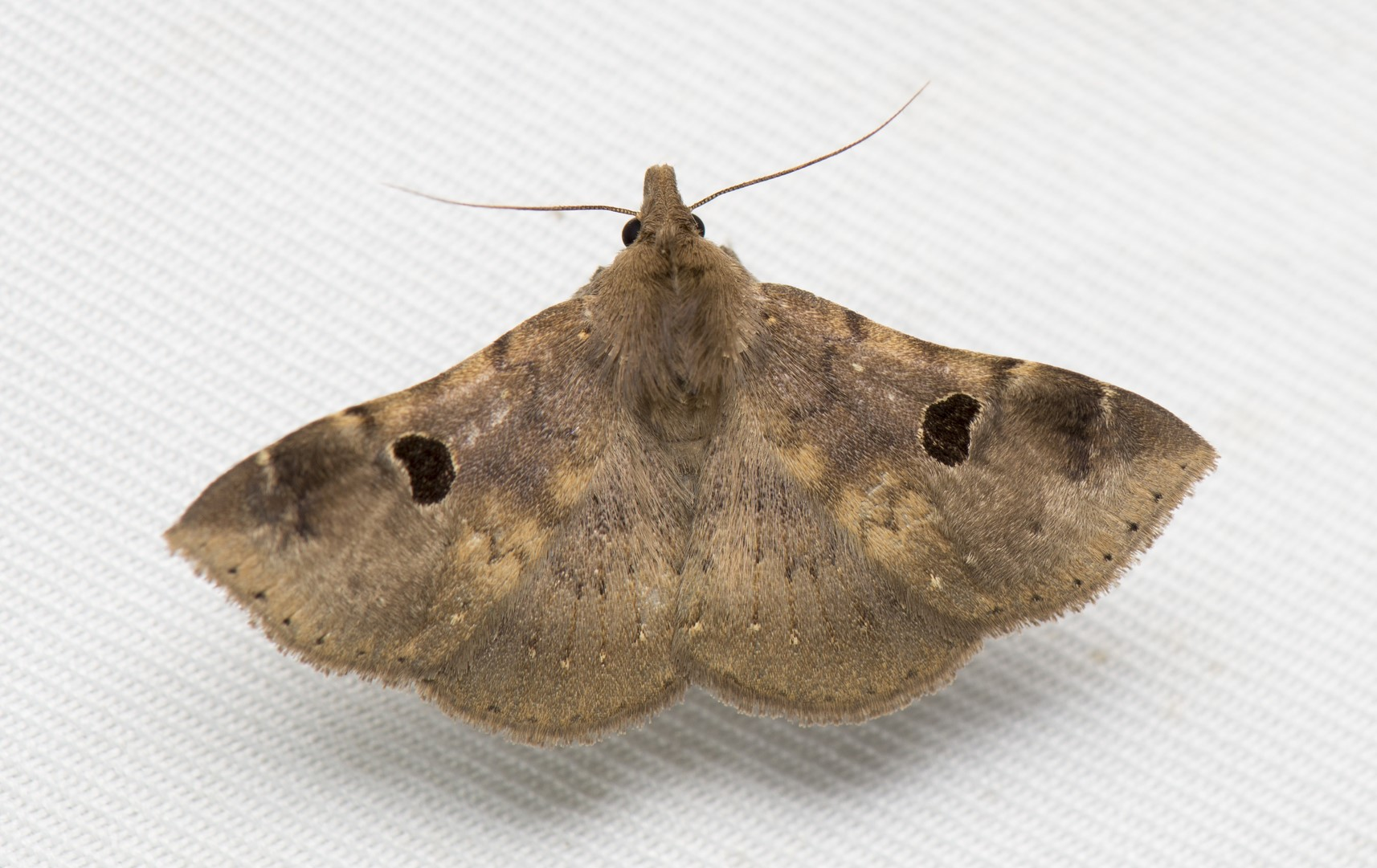
Metacausta punctilinea

Metacausta is a monotypic moth genus in the family Noctuidae. Its only species, Metacausta ustata, is found in what was then described as Khasis. Both the genus and species were first described by George Hampson, the genus in 1910 and the species twelve years earlier in 1898.
