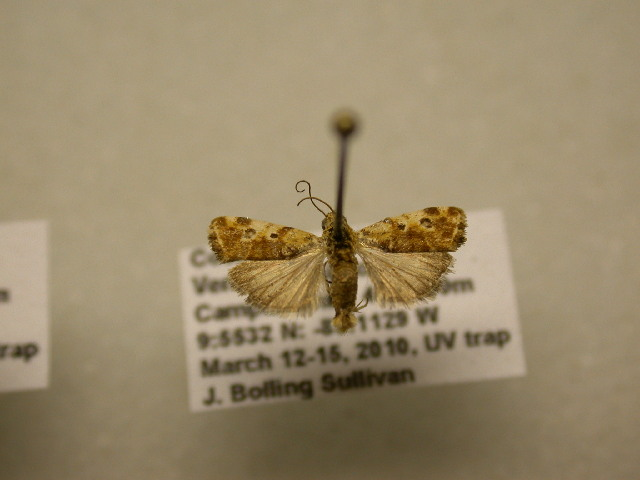

Scientific classification
- Kingdom: Animalia
- Phylum: Arthropoda
- Class: Insecta
- Order: Lepidoptera
- Superfamily: Noctuoidea
- Family: Noctuidae
- Genus: Spragueia
- Species: S. perstructana

Binomial name
- Spragueia perstructana Walker, 1865

Synonyms
- Agrophila perstructana Walker, 1865; Emmelia felina Herrich-Schäffer, 1868; Spragueia felina; Emmelia trigridula Herrich-Schäffer, 1868; Agrophila phaenna Druce, 1889; Agrophila mata Druce, 1898

= Spragueia perstructana =

Species of moth

Spragueia perstructana is a moth of the family Noctuidae first described by Francis Walker in 1865. It is found from the United States (including Maryland, South Carolina, Florida and Texas), south to the Caribbean (including Cuba Puerto Rico and the British Virgin Islands) and Central America, including Costa Rica.

The wingspan is about 15 mm.

The larvae feed on Lantana camara.
