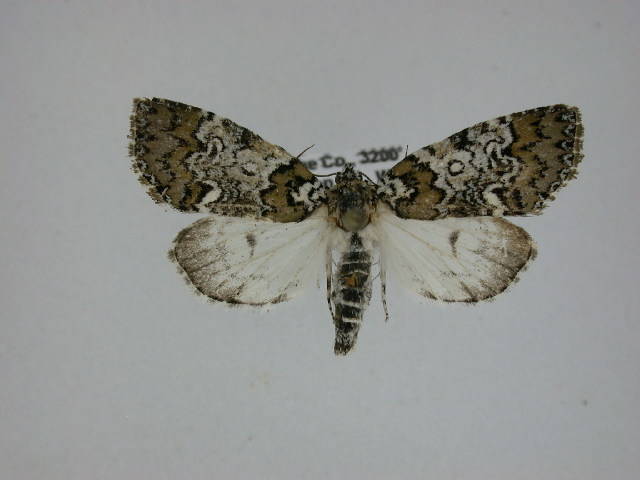

Scientific classification
- Kingdom: Animalia
- Phylum: Arthropoda
- Class: Insecta
- Order: Lepidoptera
- Superfamily: Noctuoidea
- Family: Noctuidae
- Genus: Cerma
- Species: C. cora

Binomial name
- Cerma cora Hubner, 1818

= Cerma cora =

Species of moth

Cerma cora, the owl-eyed bird dropping moth, cora moth or Himalayan clematis moth, is an owlet moth (family Noctuidae). The species was first described by Jacob Hübner in 1818. It is found in North America.

The MONA or Hodges number for Cerma cora is 9061.
