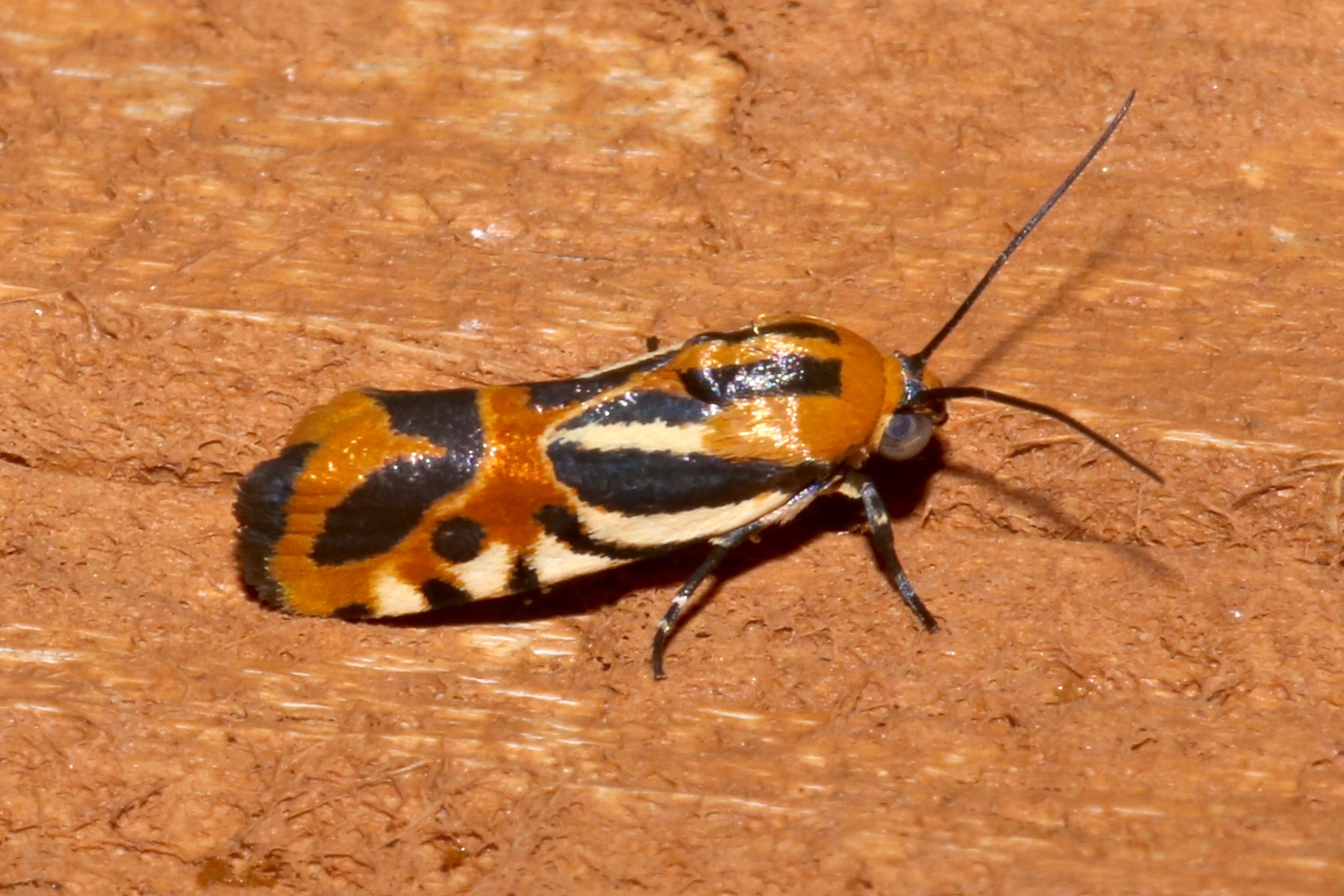

Scientific classification
- Kingdom: Animalia
- Phylum: Arthropoda
- Class: Insecta
- Order: Lepidoptera
- Superfamily: Noctuoidea
- Family: Noctuidae
- Tribe: Acontiini
- Genus: Spragueia
- Species: S. onagrus

Binomial name
- Spragueia onagrus (Guenée, 1852)

= Spragueia onagrus =

Black-dotted spragueia moth

Species of moth

Spragueia onagrus, the black-dotted spragueia moth, is a species of bird dropping moth in the family Noctuidae. It is found in North America.

The MONA or Hodges number for Spragueia onagrus is 9126.
