= Metopistis =

Scientific classification
- Domain: Eukaryota
- Kingdom: Animalia
- Phylum: Arthropoda
- Class: Insecta
- Order: Lepidoptera
- Superfamily: Noctuoidea
- Family: Noctuidae
- Subfamily: Acontiinae
- Genus: Metopistis; Warren, 1913

Genus of moths

Metopistis is a genus of moths of the family Noctuidae. The genus was described by Warren in 1913.

== Species ==
- Metopistis erschoffi Christoph, 1885
- Metopistis picturata Rothschild, 1909
