= Apaustis =

Scientific classification
- Kingdom: Animalia
- Phylum: Arthropoda
- Clade: Pancrustacea
- Class: Insecta
- Order: Lepidoptera
- Superfamily: Noctuoidea
- Family: Noctuidae
- Subfamily: Acontiinae
- Genus: Apaustis; Hübner, 1823

Genus of moths

Apaustis is a genus of moths of the family Noctuidae.

== Species ==
- Apaustis rupicola (Denis & Schiffermüller, 1775)
- Apaustis theophila (Staudinger, 1866)
