= Spragueia obatra =

Scientific classification
- Domain: Eukaryota
- Kingdom: Animalia
- Phylum: Arthropoda
- Class: Insecta
- Order: Lepidoptera
- Superfamily: Noctuoidea
- Family: Noctuidae
- Tribe: Acontiini
- Genus: Spragueia
- Species: S. obatra

Binomial name
- Spragueia obatra (Morrison, 1875)

Species of moth

Spragueia obatra is a species of bird dropping moth in the family Noctuidae. It is found in North America.

The MONA or Hodges number for Spragueia obatra is 9130.
