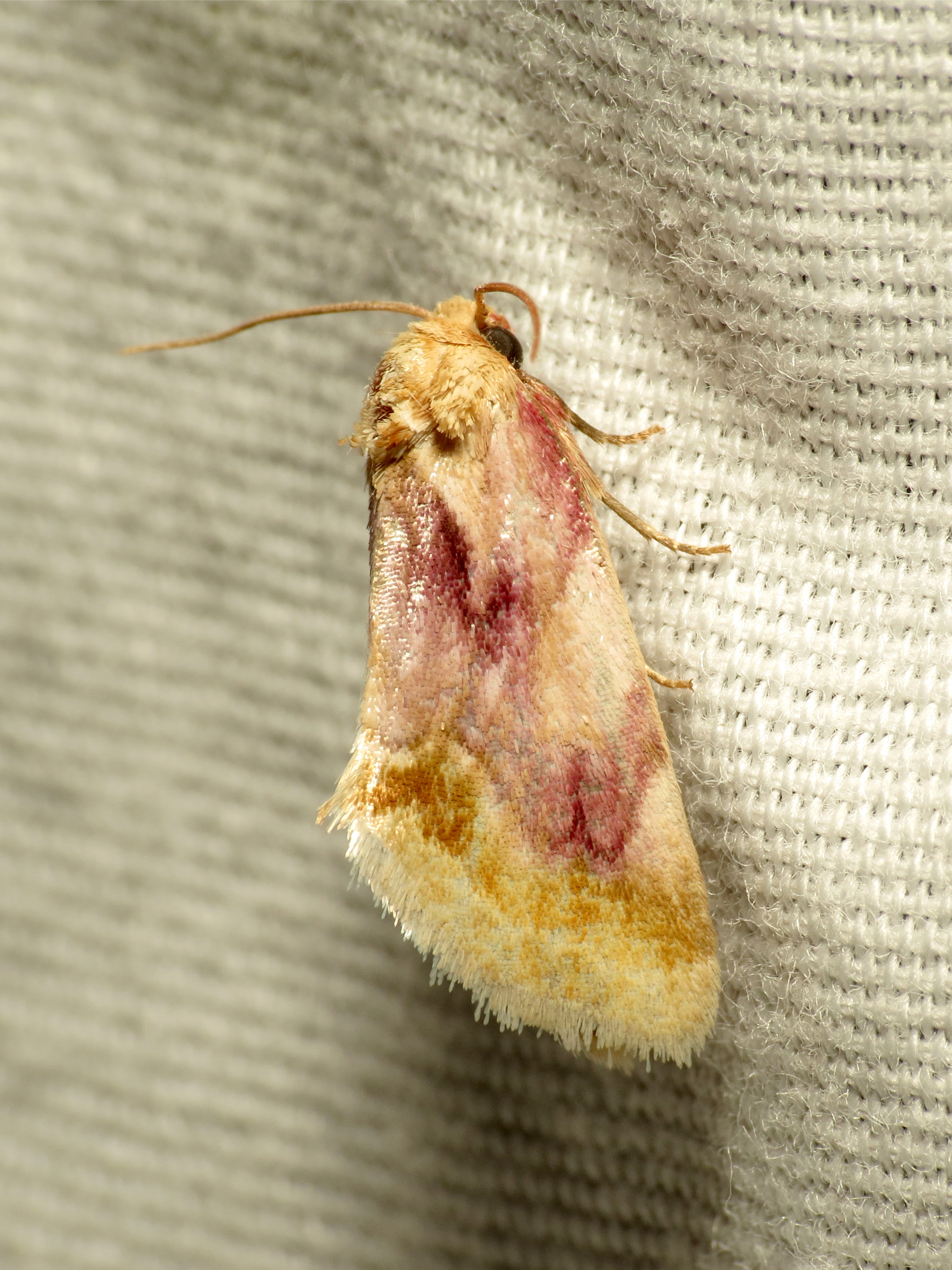

Scientific classification
- Kingdom: Animalia
- Phylum: Arthropoda
- Class: Insecta
- Order: Lepidoptera
- Superfamily: Noctuoidea
- Family: Noctuidae
- Genus: Chamaeclea
- Species: C. pernana

Binomial name
- Chamaeclea pernana (Grote, 1881)

= Chamaeclea pernana =

Species of moth

Chamaeclea pernana is a moth in the family Noctuidae (the owlet moths) first described by Augustus Radcliffe Grote in 1881. It is found in North America.

The MONA or Hodges number for Chamaeclea pernana is 9789.
