= Spragueia margana =

Scientific classification
- Domain: Eukaryota
- Kingdom: Animalia
- Phylum: Arthropoda
- Class: Insecta
- Order: Lepidoptera
- Superfamily: Noctuoidea
- Family: Noctuidae
- Genus: Spragueia
- Species: S. margana

Binomial name
- Spragueia margana (Fabricius, 1794)

Synonyms
- Spragueia cuviana (Fabricius, 1794)

Species of moth

Spragueia margana is a species of bird dropping moth in the family Noctuidae.

The MONA or Hodges number for Spragueia margana is 9132.
