= Barastrotia =

Scientific classification
- Kingdom: Animalia
- Phylum: Arthropoda
- Class: Insecta
- Order: Lepidoptera
- Superfamily: Noctuoidea
- Family: Noctuidae
- Subfamily: Acontiinae
- Genus: Barastrotia; Warren, 1913
- Species: B. metalophota

Binomial name
- Barastrotia metalophota Hampson, 1898

Genus of moths

Barastrotia is a monotypic moth genus of the family Noctuidae described by Warren in 1913. Its only species, Barastrotia metalophota, was first described by George Hampson in 1898. It is found in Khasis in north-eastern India and Bangladesh.
