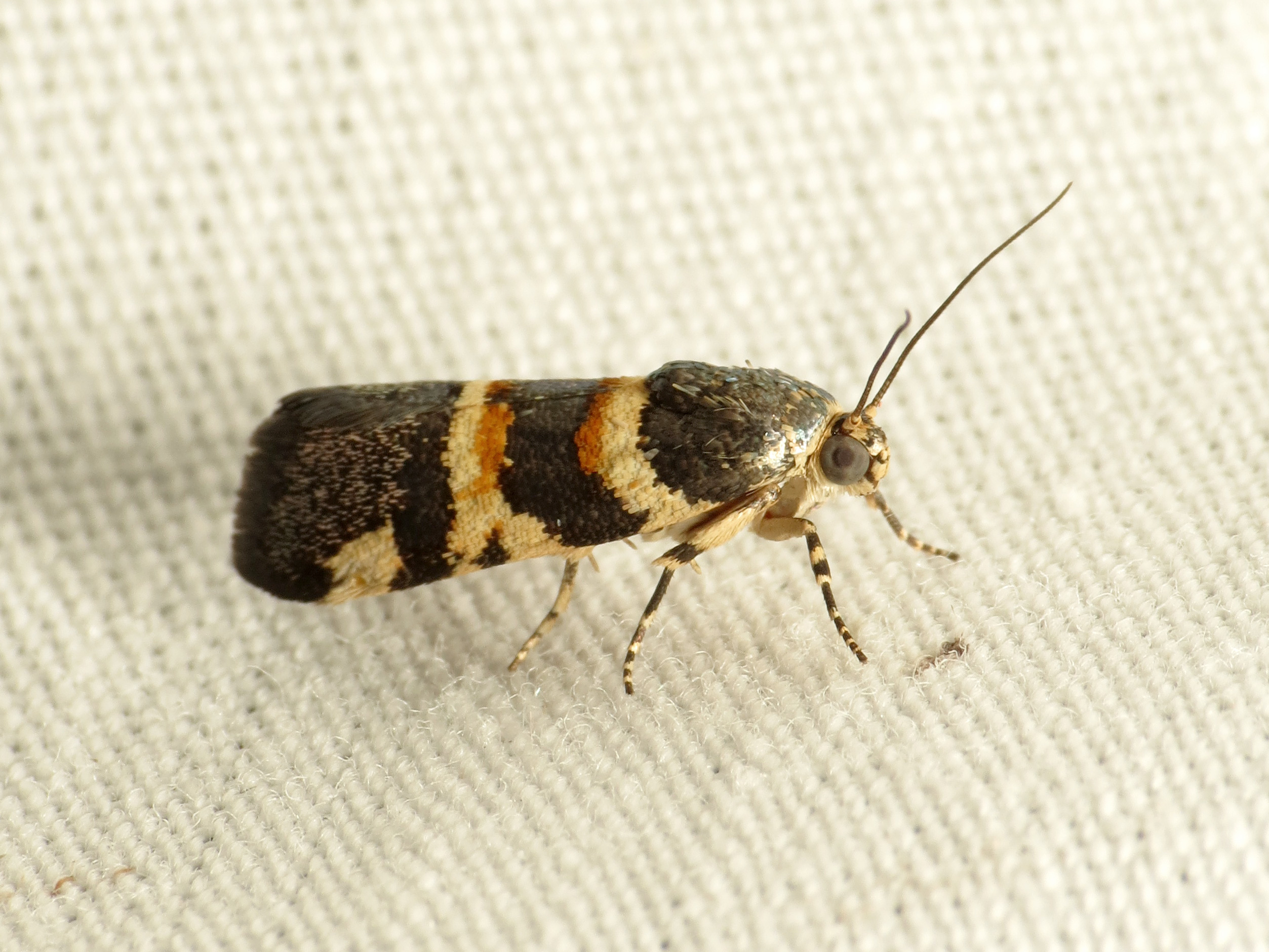

Scientific classification
- Kingdom: Animalia
- Phylum: Arthropoda
- Class: Insecta
- Order: Lepidoptera
- Superfamily: Noctuoidea
- Family: Noctuidae
- Genus: Spragueia
- Species: S. funeralis

Binomial name
- Spragueia funeralis Grote, 1881

= Spragueia funeralis =

Species of moth

Spragueia funeralis is a species of bird dropping moth in the family Noctuidae first described by Augustus Radcliffe Grote in 1881. It is found in North America.
