= Megalodes =

Scientific classification
- Domain: Eukaryota
- Kingdom: Animalia
- Phylum: Arthropoda
- Class: Insecta
- Order: Lepidoptera
- Superfamily: Noctuoidea
- Family: Noctuidae
- Subfamily: Acontiinae
- Tribe: Chamaecleini
- Genus: Megalodes; Guenee, 1852
- Species: M. eximia

Binomial name
- Megalodes eximia (Freyer, 1845)

Genus of moths

Megalodes is a genus of bird dropping moths in the family Noctuidae. This genus has a single species, Megalodes eximia.
