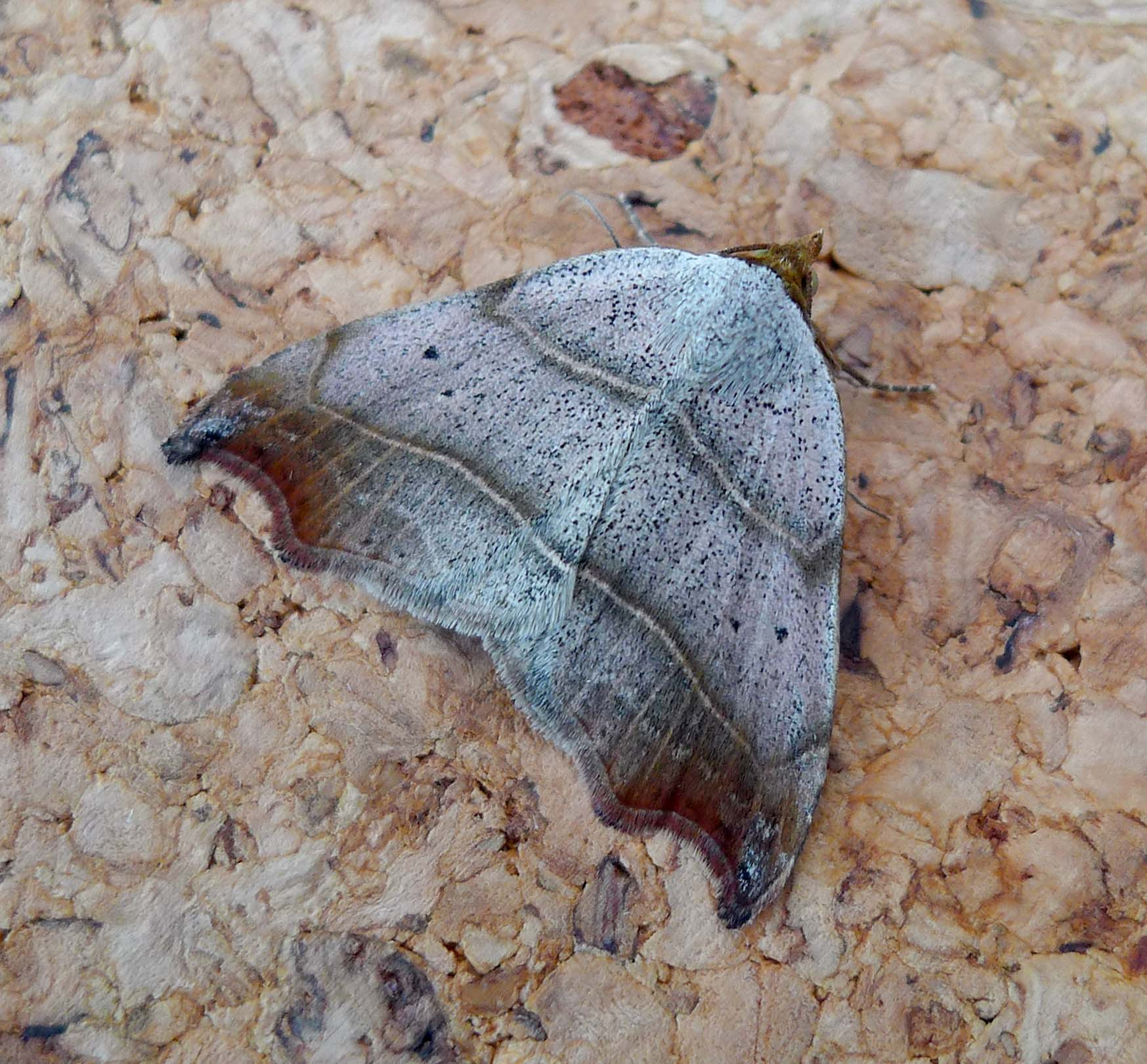

Scientific classification
- Kingdom: Animalia
- Phylum: Arthropoda
- Class: Insecta
- Order: Lepidoptera
- Superfamily: Noctuoidea
- Family: Erebidae
- Genus: Laspeyria
- Species: L. flexula

Binomial name
- Laspeyria flexula (Denis & Schiffermüller, 1775)

= Laspeyria flexula =

Species of moth

Laspeyria flexula, the beautiful hook-tip, is a moth of the family Erebidae. The species was first described by Michael Denis and Ignaz Schiffermüller in 1775. It is found in the Palearctic realm.

The wingspan is 23–27 mm. The moth flies from May to June depending on the location.

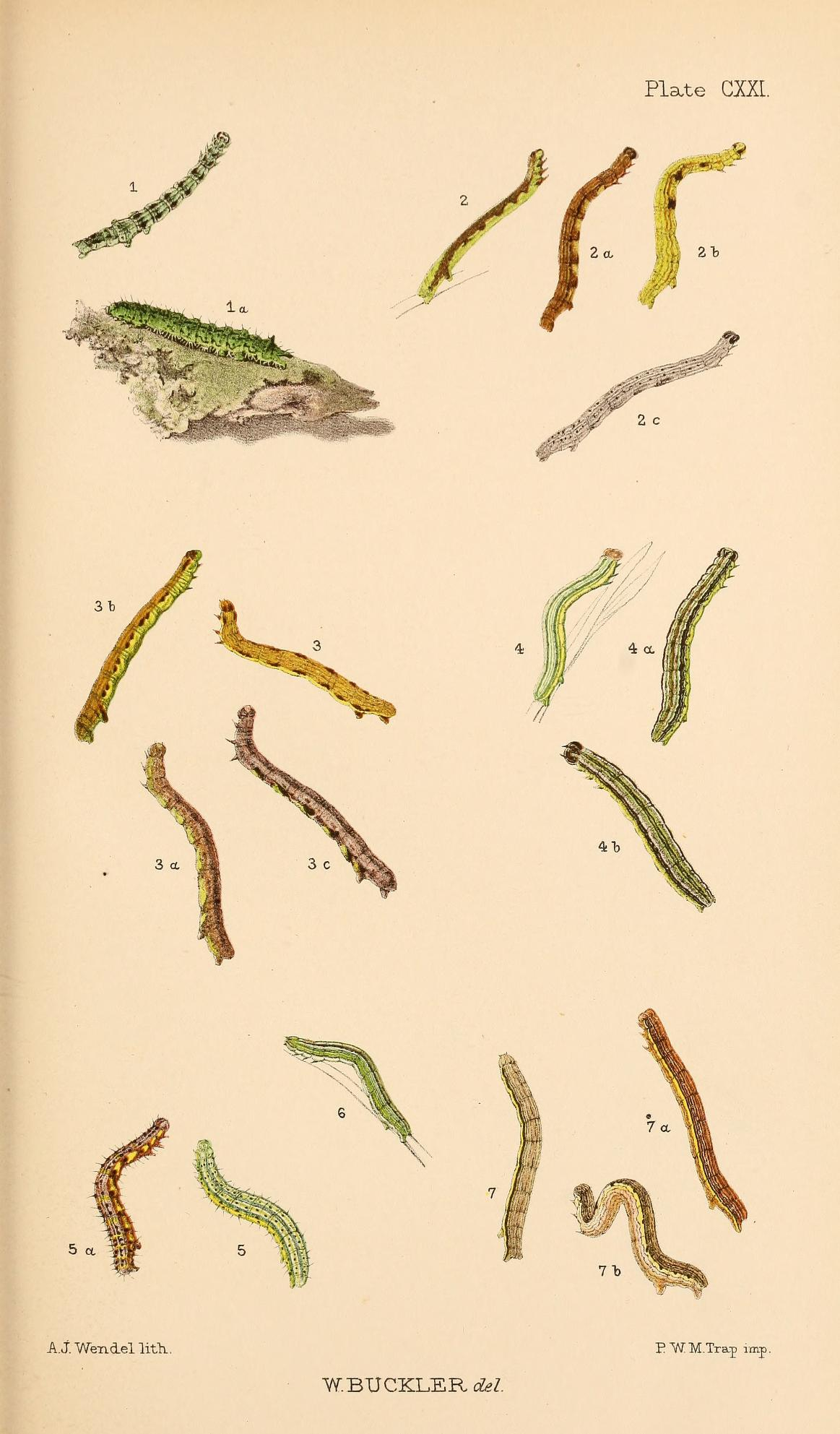
Fig 1,1a Larvae in various stages

The larvae feed on willow and Populus tremula (aspen).
