= Pseudacidalia albicosta =

Scientific classification
- Domain: Eukaryota
- Kingdom: Animalia
- Phylum: Arthropoda
- Class: Insecta
- Order: Lepidoptera
- Superfamily: Noctuoidea
- Family: Noctuidae
- Genus: Pseudacidalia
- Species: P. albicosta

Binomial name
- Pseudacidalia albicosta (Moore, [1885])

Synonyms
- Aethia albicosta Moore, [1885]

Species of moth

Pseudacidalia albicosta is a moth of the family Noctuidae first described by Frederic Moore in 1885. It is found in Sri Lanka.
