= Stenorache =

Scientific classification
- Kingdom: Animalia
- Phylum: Arthropoda
- Class: Insecta
- Order: Lepidoptera
- Superfamily: Noctuoidea
- Family: Noctuidae
- Subfamily: Acontiinae
- Genus: Stenorache; Hampson, 1910
- Species: S. nubilosa

Binomial name
- Stenorache nubilosa Hampson, 1894

Synonyms
- Tarache nubilosa Hampson, 1894

Genus of moths

Stenorache is a monotypic moth genus of the family Noctuidae. Its only species, Stenorache nubilosa, is found in the Indian state of Himachal Pradesh. Both the genus and species were first described by George Hampson, the genus in 1910 and the species 16 years earlier in 1894.
