= Acrobyla =

Scientific classification
- Domain: Eukaryota
- Kingdom: Animalia
- Phylum: Arthropoda
- Class: Insecta
- Order: Lepidoptera
- Superfamily: Noctuoidea
- Family: Noctuidae
- Subfamily: Acontiinae
- Genus: Acrobyla; Rebel, 1903

Genus of moths

Acrobyla is a genus of bird dropping moths of the family Noctuidae.

== Species ==
- Acrobyla draudti (Brandt, 1939)
- Acrobyla eylandti (Christoph, 1884)
- Acrobyla kneuckeri Rebel, 1903
