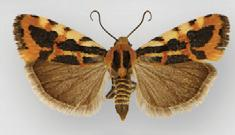

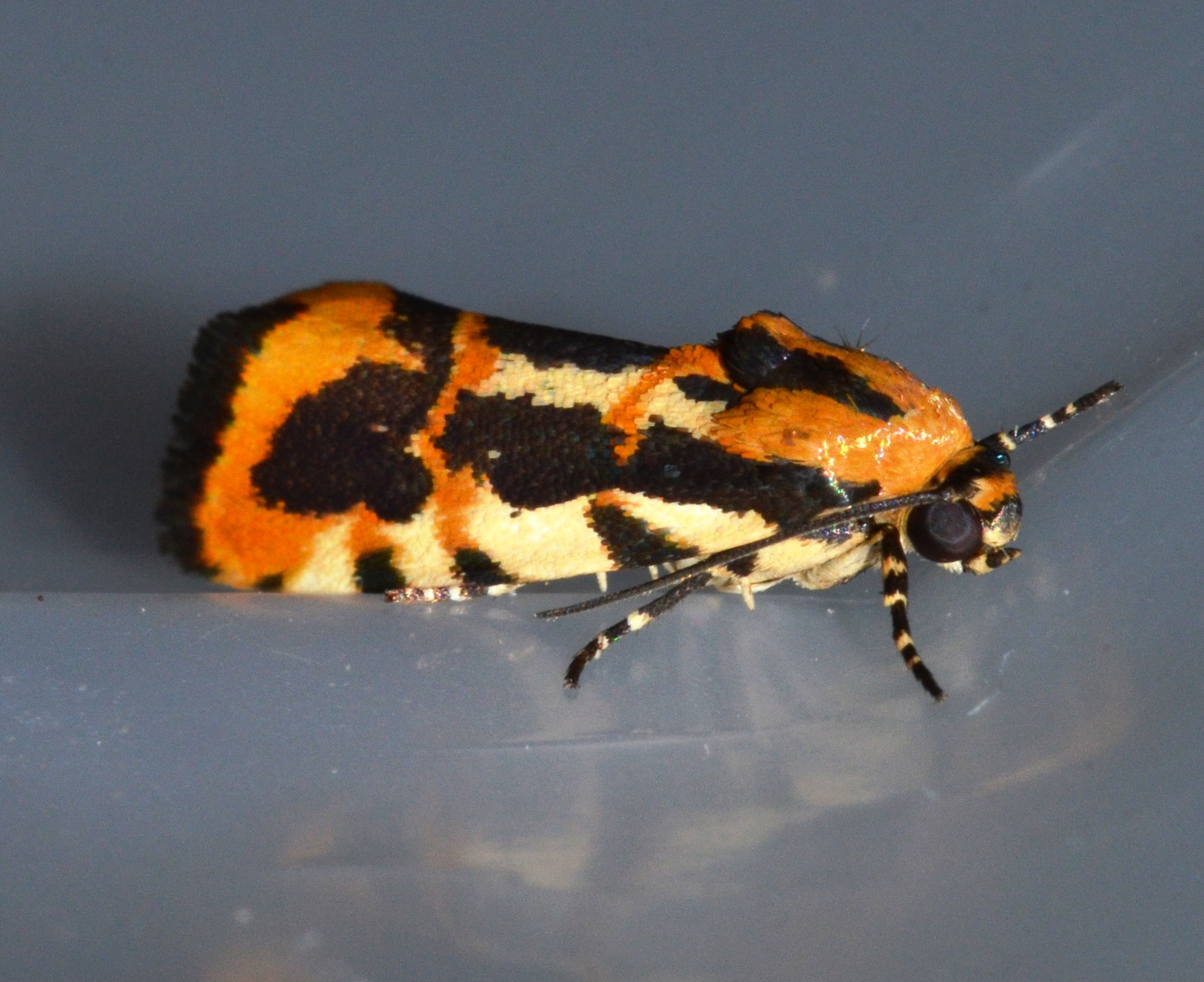

Scientific classification
- Kingdom: Animalia
- Phylum: Arthropoda
- Class: Insecta
- Order: Lepidoptera
- Superfamily: Noctuoidea
- Family: Noctuidae
- Genus: Spragueia
- Species: S. leo

Binomial name
- Spragueia leo (Guenée, 1852)

Synonyms
- Agrophila leo Guenée, 1852

= Spragueia leo =

Species of moth

Spragueia leo, the common spragueia, is a moth of the family Noctuidae. The species was first described by Achille Guenée in 1852. It is found in North America from Ontario, Manitoba and south-eastern Massachusetts, south to Florida, west to Texas and Kansas.

The wingspan is 12 to 18 millimetres (0.47 to 0.71 in). Adults are on wing from June to September. The larvae feed on Convolvulus species.
