= Shiraia tripartita =

Scientific classification
- Kingdom: Animalia
- Phylum: Arthropoda
- Clade: Pancrustacea
- Class: Insecta
- Order: Lepidoptera
- Superfamily: Noctuoidea
- Family: Noctuidae
- Subfamily: Acontiinae
- Genus: Shiraia; Sugi in Inoue, Sugi, Kuroko, Moriuti & Kawabe, 1982
- Species: S. tripartita

Binomial name
- Shiraia tripartita (Leech, 1900)

Species of moth

Shiraia is a monotypic moth genus of the family Noctuidae erected by Shigero Sugi in 1982. Its only species, Shiraia tripartita, was first described by John Henry Leech in 1900. It is found in western China.
