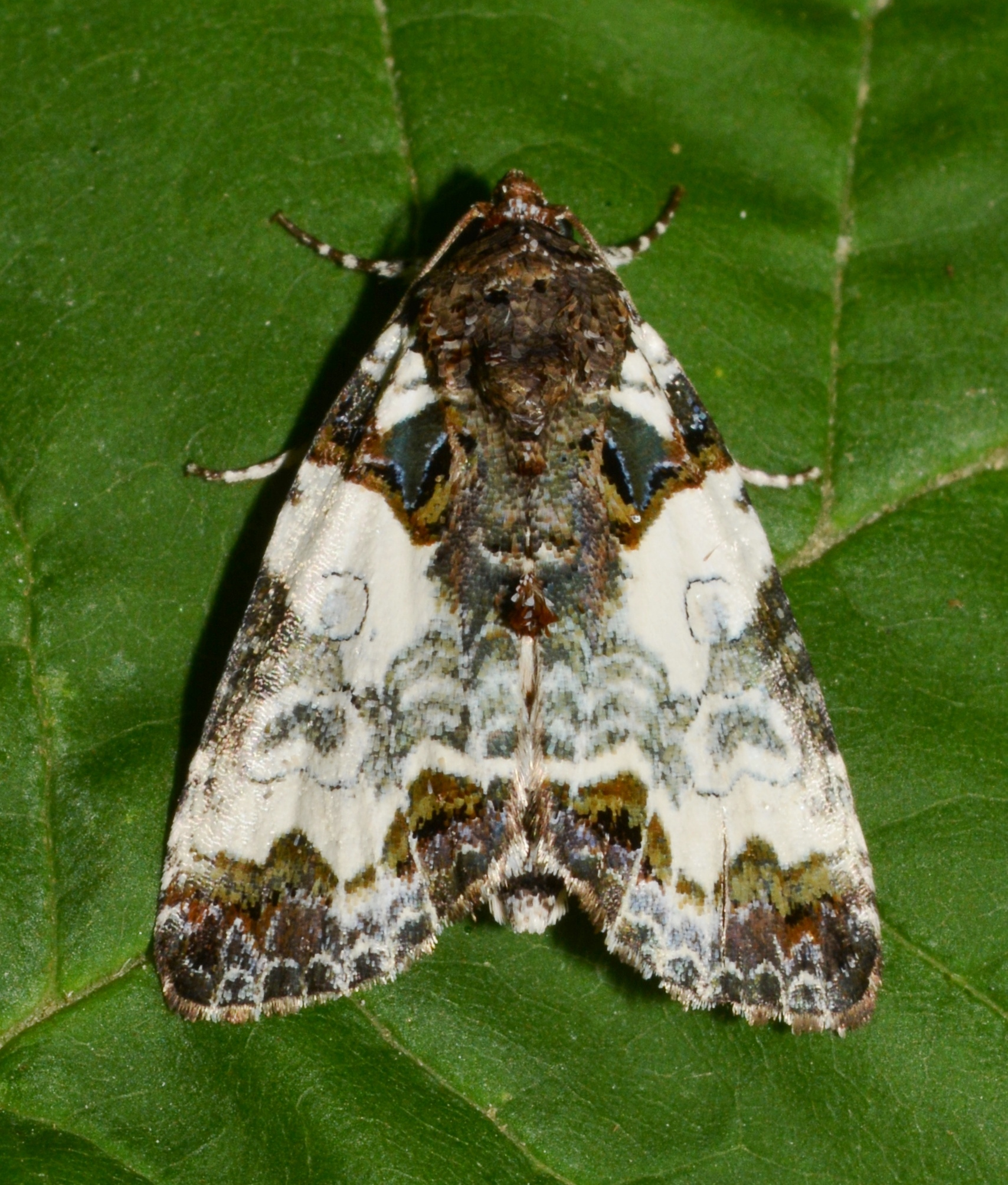
- Cerma cerintha

Scientific classification
- Kingdom: Animalia
- Phylum: Arthropoda
- Clade: Pancrustacea
- Class: Insecta
- Order: Lepidoptera
- Superfamily: Noctuoidea
- Family: Noctuidae
- Subfamily: Acronictinae
- Genus: Cerma; Hübner, 1818

Synonyms
- Achatia Hübner, 1808; Chamyris Guenée, 1852; Pachycerma Van Duzee, 1897

= Cerma =

Genus of moths

Cerma is a genus of moths of the family Noctuidae. The genus was erected by Jacob Hübner in 1818.

== Species ==
- Cerma cerintha Treitschke, 1826
- Cerma cora Hübner, 1818
- Cerma sirius Barnes & McDunnough, 1918

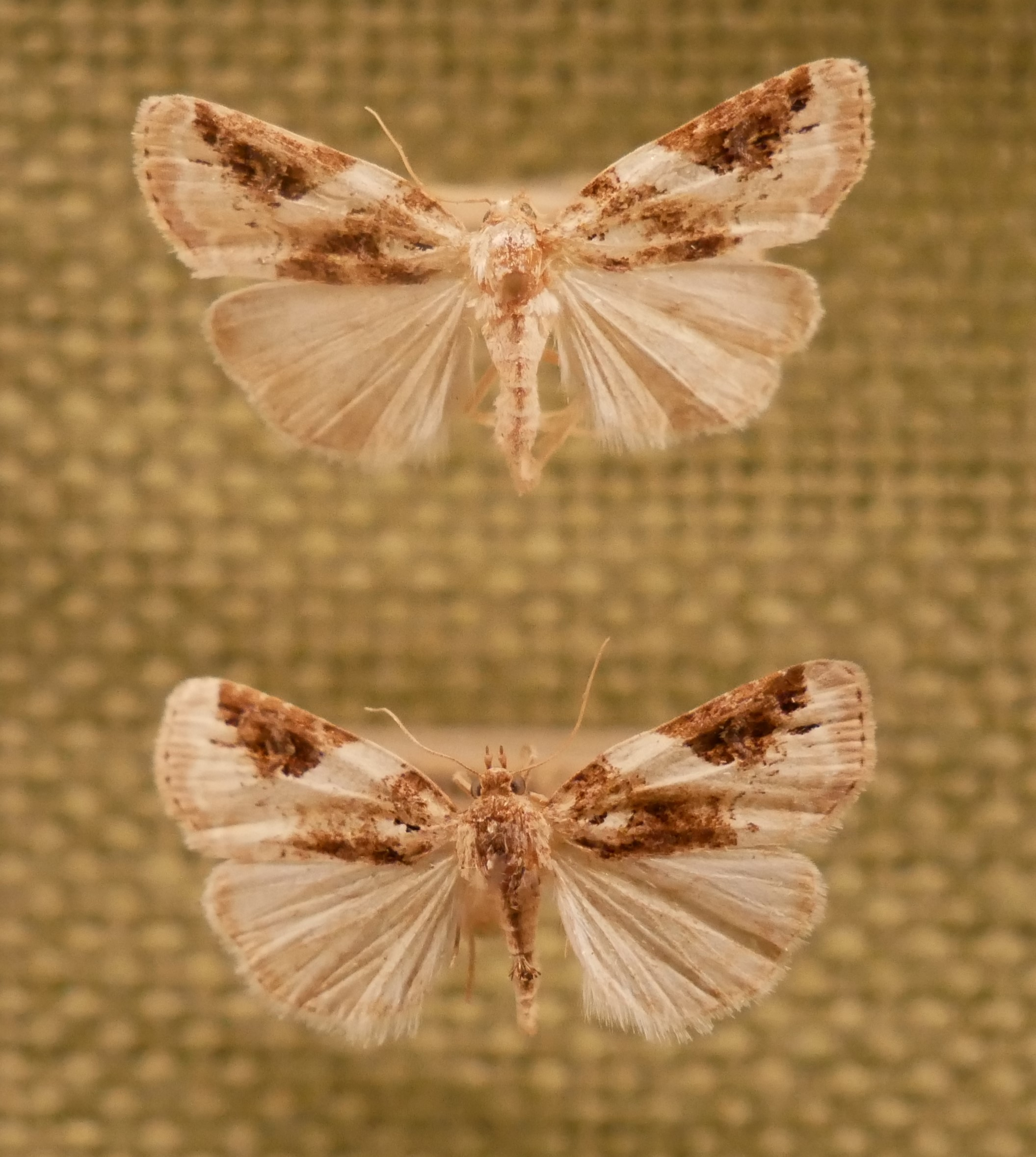
Cerma cerintha museum specimens
