= Drasteriodes =

Scientific classification
- Kingdom: Animalia
- Phylum: Arthropoda
- Class: Insecta
- Order: Lepidoptera
- Superfamily: Noctuoidea
- Family: Noctuidae
- Subfamily: Acontiinae
- Genus: Drasteriodes; Hampson, 1926

Genus of moths

Drasteriodes is a genus of moths of the family Noctuidae. The genus was erected by George Hampson in 1926.

== Species ==
- Drasteriodes ellisoni Wiltshire, 1977
- Drasteriodes elongata A. Bang-Haas 1910
- Drasteriodes eurytaenia Wiltshire, 1979
- Drasteriodes kisilkumensis Ershov, 1874
- Drasteriodes leprosa Brandt, 1938
- Drasteriodes limata Christoph, 1884
- Drasteriodes luxurians Wiltshire, 1971
- Drasteriodes medialis Hampson, 1908
