= Hemioslaria =

Scientific classification
- Domain: Eukaryota
- Kingdom: Animalia
- Phylum: Arthropoda
- Class: Insecta
- Order: Lepidoptera
- Superfamily: Noctuoidea
- Family: Noctuidae
- Subfamily: Acontiinae
- Tribe: Chamaecleini
- Genus: Hemioslaria; Barnes & Benjamin, 1924
- Species: H. pima

Binomial name
- Hemioslaria pima Barnes & Benjamin, 1924

Genus of moths

Hemioslaria is a monotypic moth genus of the family Noctuidae. Its only species, Hemioslaria pima, is known from the US state of Arizona. Both the genus and species were first described by William Barnes and Foster Hendrickson Benjamin in 1924.
