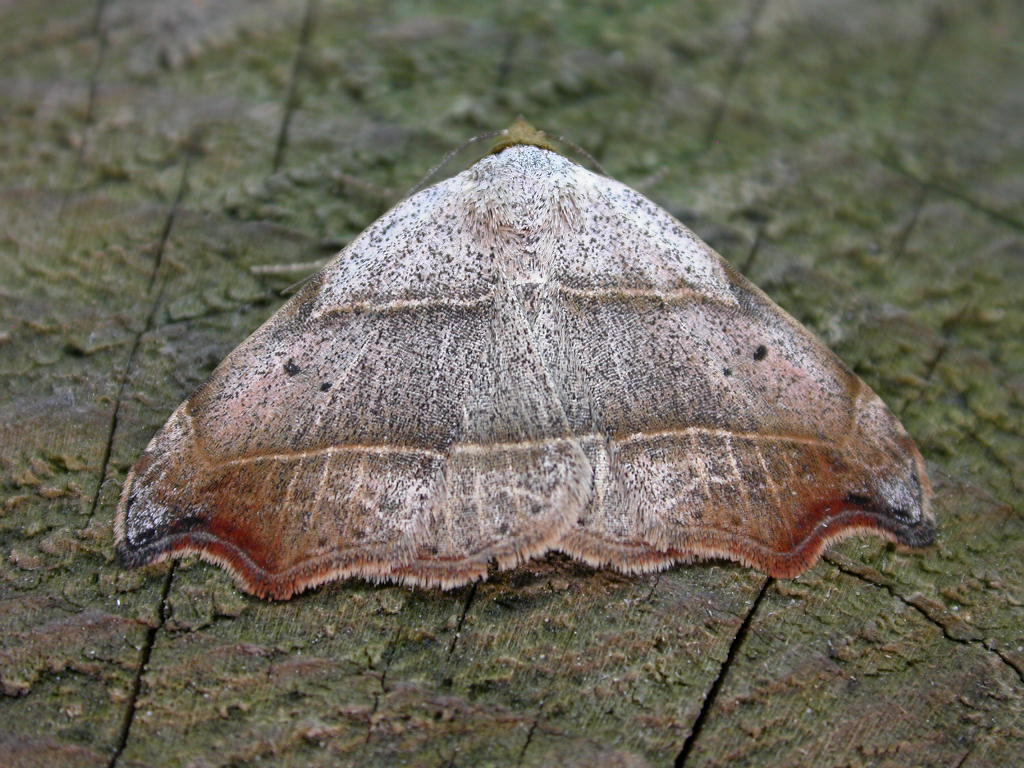

Scientific classification
- Domain: Eukaryota
- Kingdom: Animalia
- Phylum: Arthropoda
- Class: Insecta
- Order: Lepidoptera
- Superfamily: Noctuoidea
- Family: Erebidae
- Subfamily: Boletobiinae
- Genus: Laspeyria; Germar, 1810

Synonyms
- Laspeyresia Reichenbach, 1817; Colposia Hübner, [1823]; Aventia Duponchel, 1829; Euteles Gistl, 1849; Sophta Walker, [1863]; Nacerasa Walker, 1866; Perynea Hampson, 1910; Trogatha Hampson, 1910

= Laspeyria =

Genus of moths

Laspeyria is a genus of moths of the family Erebidae erected by Ernst Friedrich Germar in 1810.

== Taxonomy ==
The genus has previously been classified in the subfamilies Catocalinae or Calpinae within either the families Erebidae or Noctuidae.

== Species ==
- Laspeyria albina Wehrli
- Laspeyria emarginata Hüfnagel, 1767
- Laspeyria flexula Denis & Schiffermüller, 1775 — beautiful hook-tip
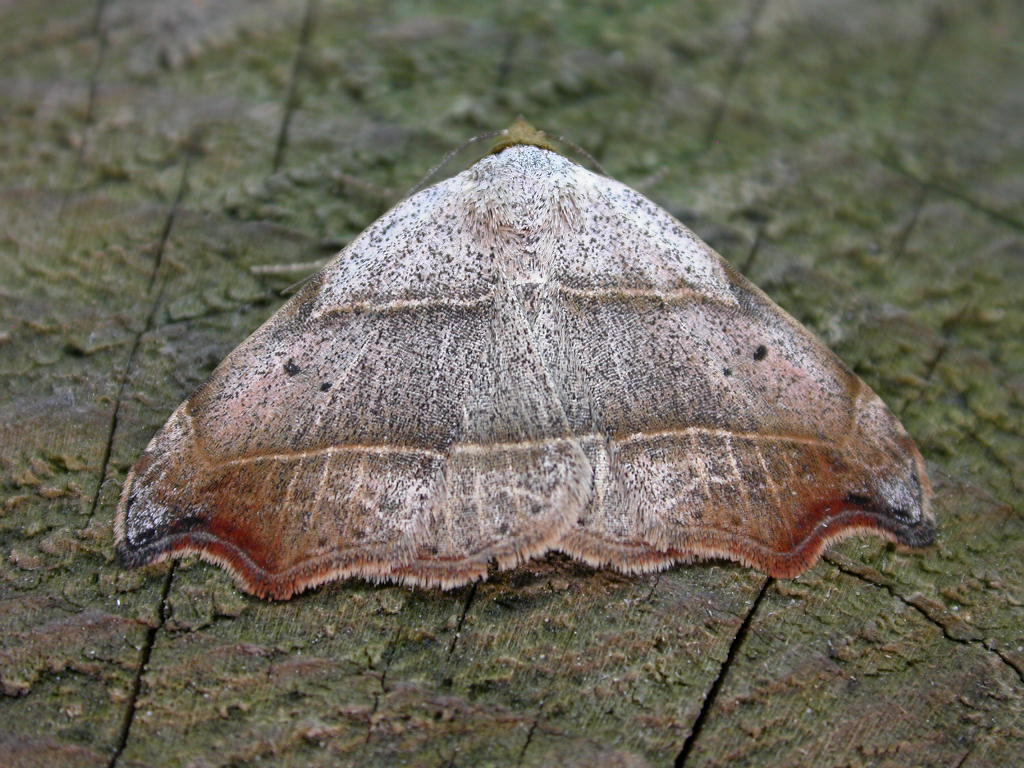
  Laspeyria flexula
- Laspeyria flexularia Hübner, 1778
- Laspeyria grisea Lempke, 1949
- Laspeyria impuncta Lempke, 1949
- Laspeyria lilacina Warren, 1913
- Laspeyria obscura Lempke, 1949
- Laspeyria rectilinealis Graeser, 1888
- Laspeyria signata Lempke, 1949
- Laspeyria sinuata Fabricius, 1777
