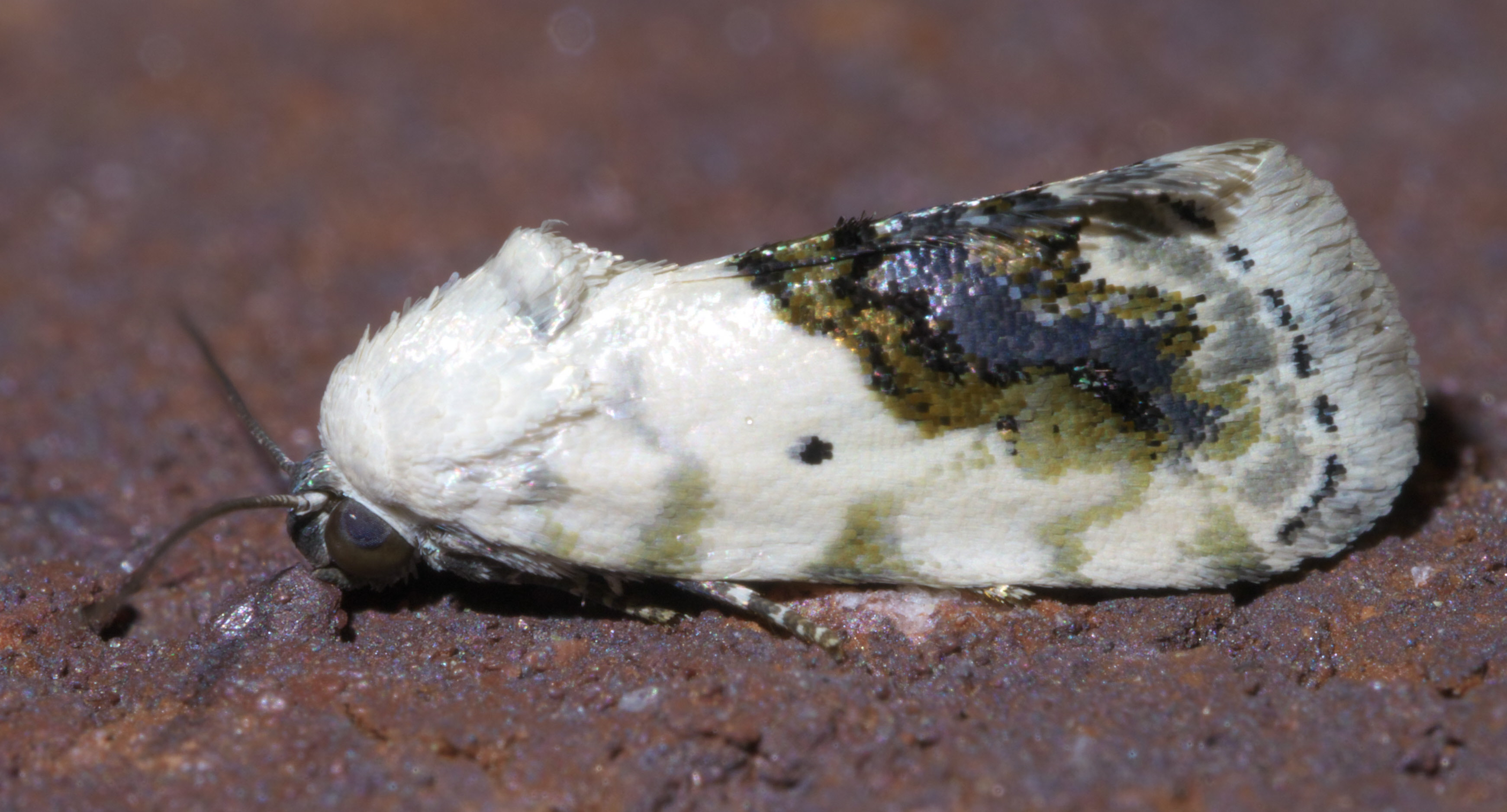
- Ponometia erastrioides, Oklahoma

Scientific classification
- Kingdom: Animalia
- Phylum: Arthropoda
- Clade: Pancrustacea
- Class: Insecta
- Order: Lepidoptera
- Superfamily: Noctuoidea
- Family: Noctuidae
- Subfamily: Acontiinae; Guenée, 1841

Tribes
- Acontiini Guenée, 1841; Armadini; Chamaecleini Keegan & Wagner, 2019

= Acontiinae =

Subfamily of moths

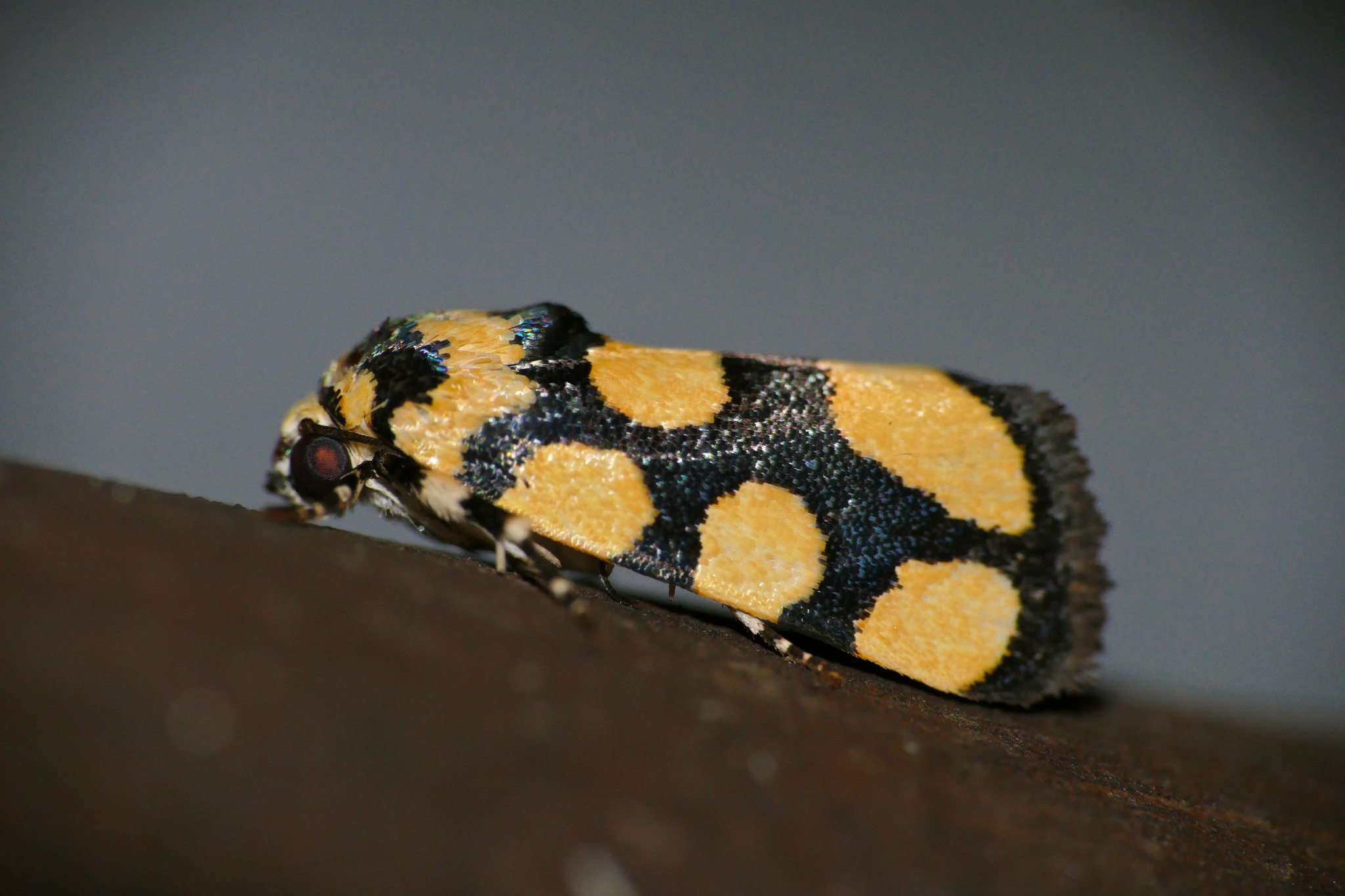
Acontia guttifera, South Africa

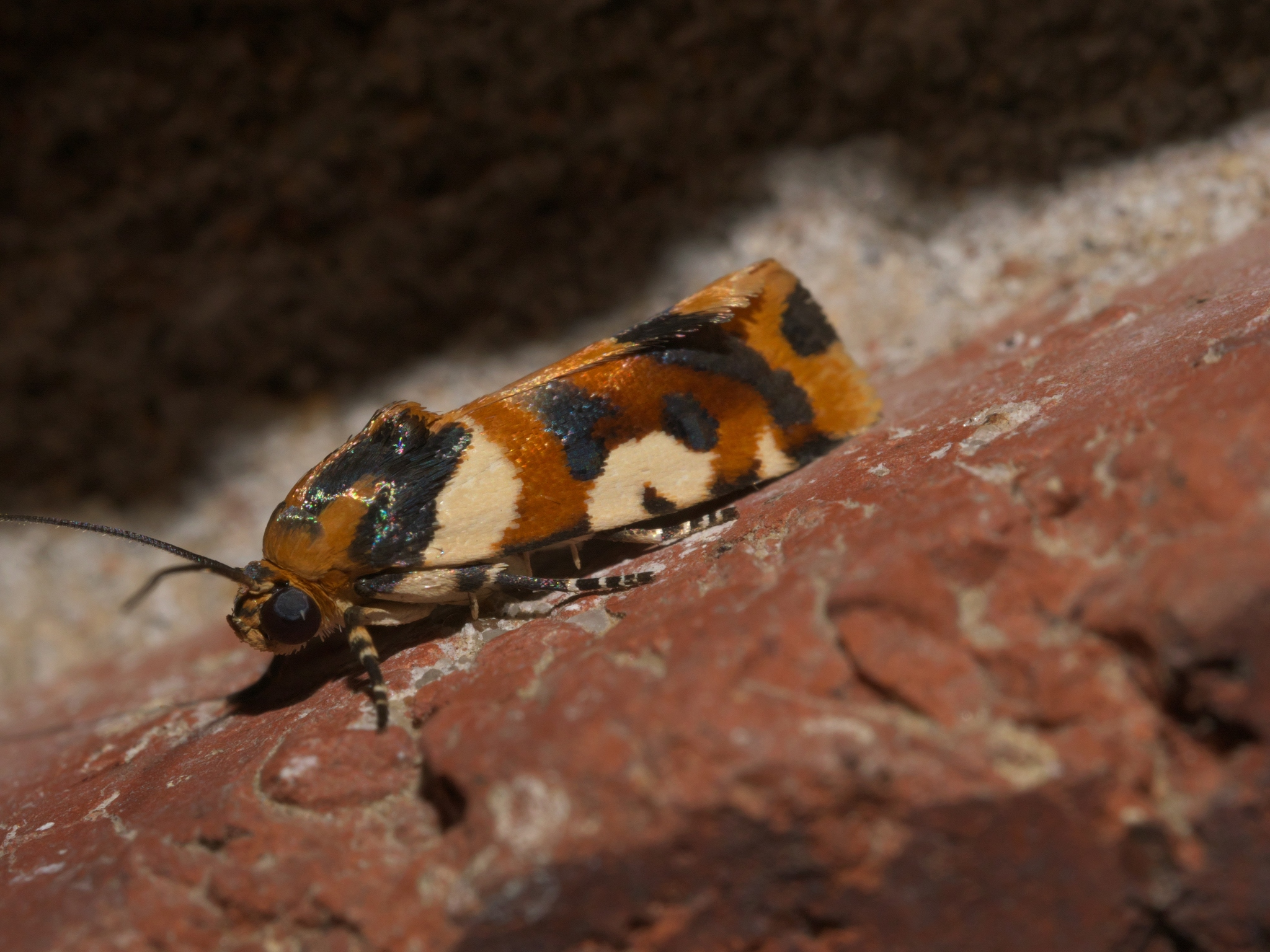
Spragueia dama, Oklahoma

Acontiinae is a subfamily of bird dropping moths in the family Noctuidae. There are more than 50 genera and 430 described species in Acontiinae, found worldwide in temperate and tropical climates.

== Genera ==
These genera belong to the subfamily Acontiinae:

Tribe Acontiini Guenée, 1841
Acontia Ochsenheimer, 1816
Eusceptis Hübner, 1823
Phyllophila Guenée, 1852
Ponometia Herrich-Schäffer, 1868
Pseudalypia H.Edwards, 1874
Spragueia Grote, 1875
Tarache Hübner, 1823
Tribe Armadini
Armada Staudinger, 1884
Asplenia Hampson, 1916
Tribe Chamaecleini
Aleptinoides Barnes & McDunnough, 1912
Austrazenia Warren, 1913
Chalcoecia Hampson, 1908
Chamaeclea Grote, 1883
Heminocloa Barnes & Benjamin, 1924
Hemioslaria Barnes & Benjamin, 1924
Megalodes Guenee, 1852
Thurberiphaga Dyar, 1920
Trogotorna Hampson, 1910
Not placed in a tribe
Acrobyla Rebel, 1903
Alypophanes Turner, 1908
Apaustis Hübner, 1823
Barastrotia Warren, 1913
Bostrodes Hampson, 1910
Chamyris Guenée, 1852
Chara Staudinger, 1892
Cingalesa Hampson, 1884
Drasteriodes Hampson, 1926
Drobeta Walker, 1858
Duhemia Rungs, 1943
Ectrogatha Hampson, 1910
Emmelia
Heterorta Warren, 1913
Lambana Walker, 1866
Latiphea Özdikmen & Seven, 2006
Metacausta Hampson, 1910
Metopoceras Guenee, 1850
Mimoruza Hampson, 1895
Outaya Chrétien, 1911
Oxytrita Warren, 1913
Parerastria Warren, 1914
Perynea Hampson, 1910
Pseudacidalia Hampson, 1894
Pyraloides Rebel, 1948
Rabila Walker, 1865
Rhodotarache Warren, 1914
Shiraia
Stemmaphora Staudinger, 1888
Stenocryptis Warren, 1913
Stenorache Hampson, 1910
Tephrochares Zerny, 1933
Trissernis Meyrick, 1902
Trogoblemma Hampson, 1910
