= Hiccoda nigripalpis =

Scientific classification
- Kingdom: Animalia
- Phylum: Arthropoda
- Class: Insecta
- Order: Lepidoptera
- Superfamily: Noctuoidea
- Family: Noctuidae
- Genus: Hiccoda
- Species: H. nigripalpis

Binomial name
- Hiccoda nigripalpis Walker, 1866

Species of moth

Hiccoda nigripalpis is a moth of the family Erebidae first described by Francis Walker in 1866. It is found in Sri Lanka.
