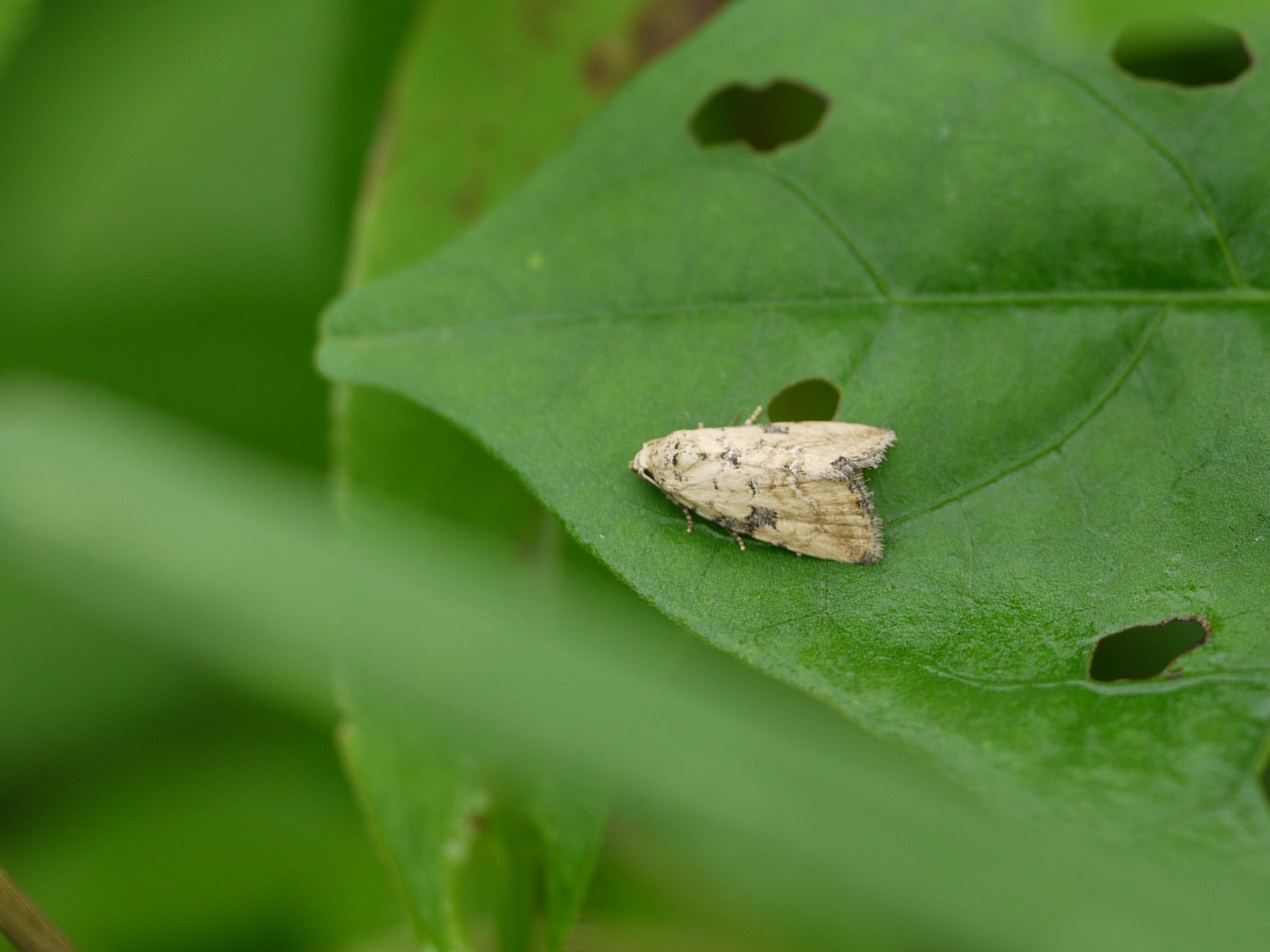

Scientific classification
- Domain: Eukaryota
- Kingdom: Animalia
- Phylum: Arthropoda
- Class: Insecta
- Order: Lepidoptera
- Superfamily: Noctuoidea
- Family: Erebidae
- Genus: Hiccoda
- Species: H. dosaroides

Binomial name
- Hiccoda dosaroides Moore, 1882

= Hiccoda dosaroides =

Species of moth

Hiccoda dosaroides is a moth of the family Erebidae first described by Frederic Moore in 1882. It is found in Sri Lanka.
