= Hiccoda =

Scientific classification
- Domain: Eukaryota
- Kingdom: Animalia
- Phylum: Arthropoda
- Class: Insecta
- Order: Lepidoptera
- Superfamily: Noctuoidea
- Family: Erebidae
- Genus: Hiccoda; Moore, 1882

Genus of moths

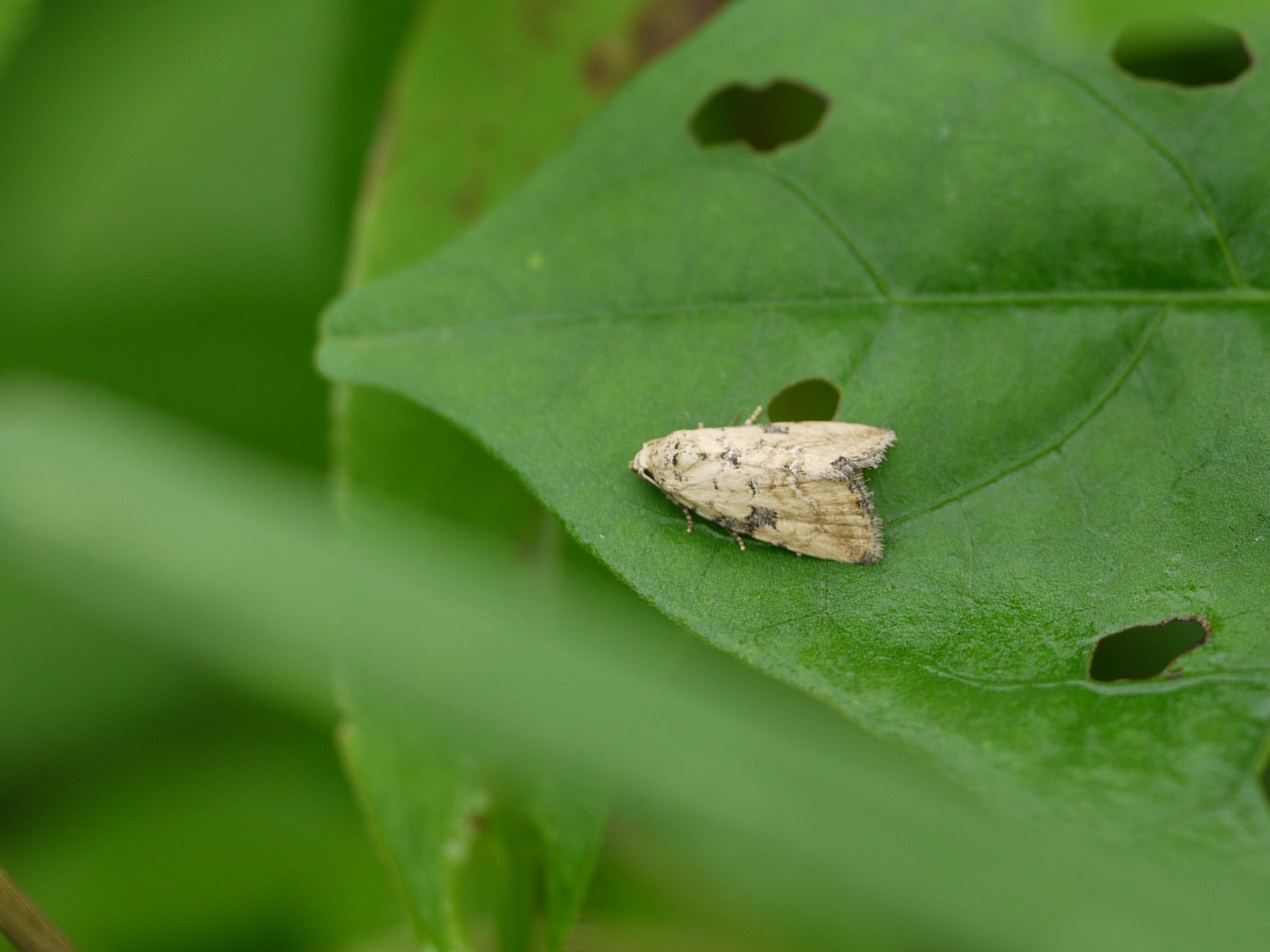
Hiccoda dosaroides

Hiccoda is a genus of moths of the family Erebidae. The genus was erected by Frederic Moore in 1882.

== Species ==
Some species of this genus are:

- Hiccoda clarae Berio, 1947
- Hiccoda dosaroides Moore, 1882
- Hiccoda eccausta Hampson 1910
- Hiccoda nigripalpis (Walker, 1866)
- Hiccoda plebeia (Butler 1889)
- Hiccoda roseitincta Hampson, 1920
