= Palpita parvifraterna =

Scientific classification
- Kingdom: Animalia
- Phylum: Arthropoda
- Class: Insecta
- Order: Lepidoptera
- Family: Crambidae
- Genus: Palpita
- Species: P. parvifraterna

Binomial name
- Palpita parvifraterna Inoue, 1999

Species of moth

Palpita parvifraterna is a moth in the family Crambidae. It was described by Hiroshi Inoue in 1999. It is found in China (Fujian, Jiangxi, Henan, Hubei, Guangdong, Guangxi, Sichuan, Guizhou, Hong Kong).
