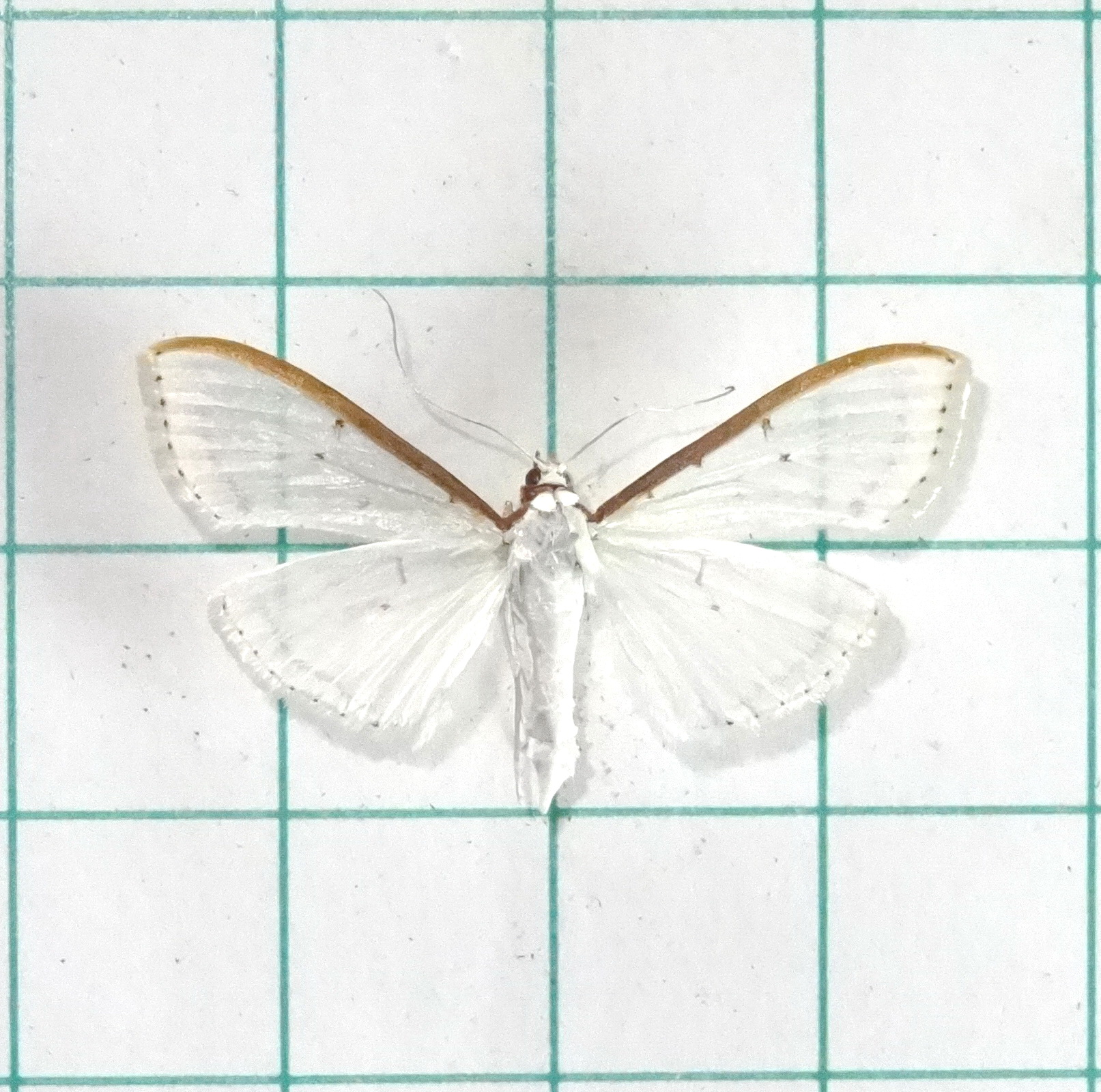

Scientific classification
- Kingdom: Animalia
- Phylum: Arthropoda
- Clade: Pancrustacea
- Class: Insecta
- Order: Lepidoptera
- Family: Crambidae
- Genus: Palpita
- Species: P. asiaticalis

Binomial name
- Palpita asiaticalis Inoue, 1994

= Palpita asiaticalis =

Species of moth

Palpita asiaticalis is a moth in the family Crambidae. It was described by Hiroshi Inoue in 1994. It is found in Taiwan, China (Guizhou, Yunnan), Vietnam, Thailand, India, Nepal and Cambodia.
