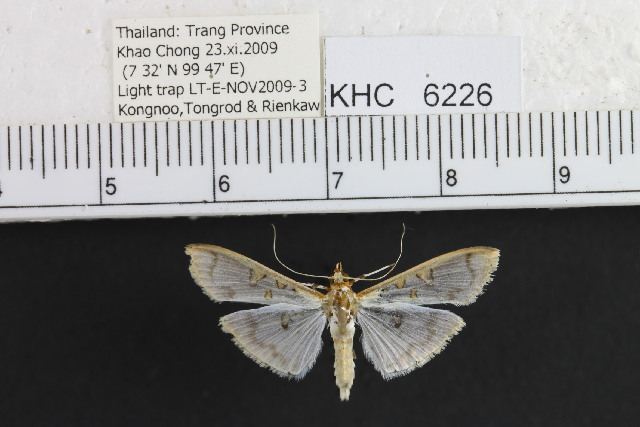

Scientific classification
- Kingdom: Animalia
- Phylum: Arthropoda
- Class: Insecta
- Order: Lepidoptera
- Family: Crambidae
- Genus: Palpita
- Species: P. hypohomalia

Binomial name
- Palpita hypohomalia Inoue, 1996

= Palpita hypohomalia =

Species of moth

Palpita hypohomalia is a moth in the family Crambidae. It was described by Hiroshi Inoue in 1996. It is found in Taiwan, China (Guizhou) and Thailand.
