= Palpita indannulata =

Scientific classification
- Kingdom: Animalia
- Phylum: Arthropoda
- Class: Insecta
- Order: Lepidoptera
- Family: Crambidae
- Genus: Palpita
- Species: P. indannulata

Binomial name
- Palpita indannulata Inoue, 1996

Species of moth

Palpita indannulata is a moth in the family Crambidae. It was described by Hiroshi Inoue in 1996. It is found in Nepal, China (Guangdong), north-eastern India, Thailand, Indonesia (Sumatra, Java), the Philippines, Papua New Guinea, and Australia.
