= Palpita hollowayi =

Scientific classification
- Kingdom: Animalia
- Phylum: Arthropoda
- Class: Insecta
- Order: Lepidoptera
- Family: Crambidae
- Genus: Palpita
- Species: P. hollowayi

Binomial name
- Palpita hollowayi Inoue, 1997

Species of moth

Palpita hollowayi is a moth in the family Crambidae. It was described by Inoue in 1997. It is found in New Caledonia.
