= Palpita griseofascialis =

Scientific classification
- Kingdom: Animalia
- Phylum: Arthropoda
- Class: Insecta
- Order: Lepidoptera
- Family: Crambidae
- Genus: Palpita
- Species: P. griseofascialis

Binomial name
- Palpita griseofascialis Inoue, 1997

Species of moth

Palpita griseofascialis is a moth in the family Crambidae. It was described by Hiroshi Inoue in 1997. It is found in Indonesia (Sumatra) and Peninsular Malaysia.

== Subspecies ==
- Palpita griseofascialis griseofascialis
- Palpita griseofascialis sumatrana Inoue, 1997 (Sumatra)
