= Eupithecia emittens =

Scientific classification
- Kingdom: Animalia
- Phylum: Arthropoda
- Class: Insecta
- Order: Lepidoptera
- Family: Geometridae
- Genus: Eupithecia
- Species: E. emittens

Binomial name
- Eupithecia emittens Inoue, 1996

Synonyms
- Eupithecia mystica Vojnits, 1988 (preocc. Eupithecia gemellata f. mystica Dietze, 1910)

Species of moth

Eupithecia emittens is a moth in the family Geometridae. It is found in Pakistan, India and Tajikistan.
