= Palpita disjunctalis =

Scientific classification
- Kingdom: Animalia
- Phylum: Arthropoda
- Class: Insecta
- Order: Lepidoptera
- Family: Crambidae
- Genus: Palpita
- Species: P. disjunctalis

Binomial name
- Palpita disjunctalis Inoue, 1999

Species of moth

Palpita disjunctalis is a moth in the family Crambidae. It was described by Hiroshi Inoue in 1999. It is found in the Philippines (Mindanao).
