= Palpita uedai =

Scientific classification
- Kingdom: Animalia
- Phylum: Arthropoda
- Class: Insecta
- Order: Lepidoptera
- Family: Crambidae
- Genus: Palpita
- Species: P. uedai

Binomial name
- Palpita uedai Inoue, 1997

Species of moth

Palpita uedai is a moth in the family Crambidae. It was described by Hiroshi Inoue in 1997. It is found in Indonesia (Sulawesi) and Australia.
