= Palpita rhodocosta =

Scientific classification
- Kingdom: Animalia
- Phylum: Arthropoda
- Class: Insecta
- Order: Lepidoptera
- Family: Crambidae
- Genus: Palpita
- Species: P. rhodocosta

Binomial name
- Palpita rhodocosta Inoue, 1997

Synonyms
- Palpita rhodocosta erithraia Inoue, 1997; Palpita rhodocosta erythraea Inoue, 1997

Species of moth

Palpita rhodocosta is a moth in the family Crambidae. It was described by Hiroshi Inoue in 1997. It is found in Papua New Guinea and Australia, where it has been recorded from Queensland.

The wings are translucent with brown-edged spots and a rusty brown costa.

== Subspecies ==
- Palpita rhodocosta rhodocosta (Australia: Queensland)
- Palpita rhodocosta erythraia Inoue, 1997 (Papua New Guinea: Normanby Island)
