= Palpita munroei =

Scientific classification
- Kingdom: Animalia
- Phylum: Arthropoda
- Class: Insecta
- Order: Lepidoptera
- Family: Crambidae
- Genus: Palpita
- Species: P. munroei

Binomial name
- Palpita munroei Inoue, 1996

Species of moth

Palpita munroei is a moth in the family Crambidae. It was described by Hiroshi Inoue in 1996. It is found in China (Zhejiang, Fujian, Hunan, Guangdong, Guangxi, Guizhou, Yunnan, Hong Kong), Japan, Vietnam, Thailand, Borneo, Sumatra, Sulawesi, Java, the Philippines, India and Nepal.
