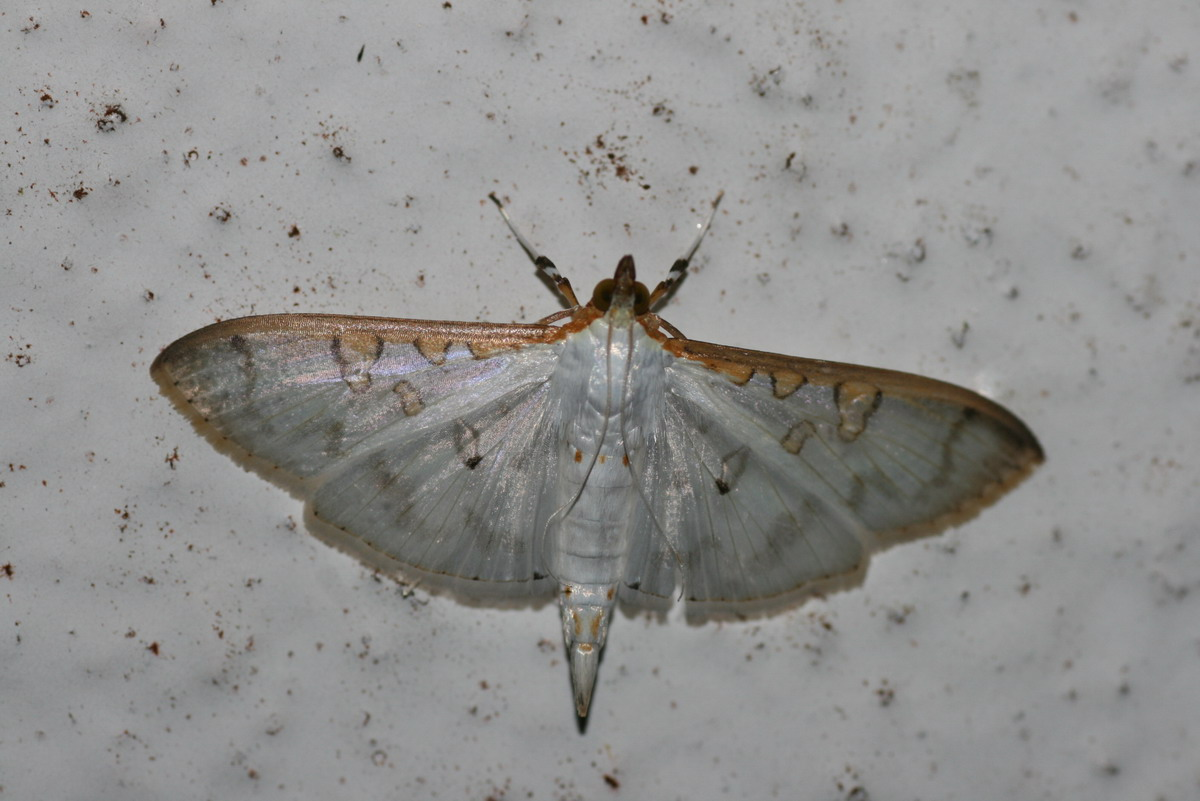

Scientific classification
- Kingdom: Animalia
- Phylum: Arthropoda
- Class: Insecta
- Order: Lepidoptera
- Family: Crambidae
- Genus: Palpita
- Species: P. annulifer

Binomial name
- Palpita annulifer Inoue, 1996

= Palpita annulifer =

Species of moth

Palpita annulifer is a moth in the family Crambidae. It was described by Hiroshi Inoue in 1996. It is found in Thailand, Taiwan, India, Indonesia (Sumatra, Java, Borneo) and the Philippines.
