= Palpita illustrata =

Scientific classification
- Kingdom: Animalia
- Phylum: Arthropoda
- Class: Insecta
- Order: Lepidoptera
- Family: Crambidae
- Genus: Palpita
- Species: P. illustrata

Binomial name
- Palpita illustrata Inoue, 1997

Species of moth

Palpita illustrata is a moth in the family Crambidae. It was described by Hiroshi Inoue in 1997. It is found on Peninsular Malaysia.
