= Palpita margaritacea =

Scientific classification
- Kingdom: Animalia
- Phylum: Arthropoda
- Class: Insecta
- Order: Lepidoptera
- Family: Crambidae
- Genus: Palpita
- Species: P. margaritacea

Binomial name
- Palpita margaritacea Inoue, 1997

Species of moth

Palpita margaritacea is a moth in the family Crambidae. It was described by Hiroshi Inoue in 1997. It is found in Australia, where it has been recorded from New South Wales, Queensland and the Australian Capital Territory.

Adults are white with a brown costa and a small brown spot near the middle of the forewings.
