= Palpita austrounionalis =

Scientific classification
- Kingdom: Animalia
- Phylum: Arthropoda
- Class: Insecta
- Order: Lepidoptera
- Family: Crambidae
- Genus: Palpita
- Species: P. austrounionalis

Binomial name
- Palpita austrounionalis Inoue, 1997

Species of moth

Palpita austrounionalis is a moth in the family Crambidae. It was described by Hiroshi Inoue in 1997. It is found in Papua New Guinea, Australia and New Caledonia, where it has been recorded from the Northern Territory.
