= Eupithecia asempiterna =

Scientific classification
- Kingdom: Animalia
- Phylum: Arthropoda
- Class: Insecta
- Order: Lepidoptera
- Family: Geometridae
- Genus: Eupithecia
- Species: E. asempiterna

Binomial name
- Eupithecia asempiterna Inoue, 2000

Synonyms
- Eupithecia sempiterna Vojnits, 1988 (preocc. Vojnits, 1984)

Species of moth

Eupithecia asempiterna is a moth in the family Geometridae first described by Hiroshi Inoue in 2000. It is found in India and Nepal.
