= Palpita perunionalis =

Scientific classification
- Kingdom: Animalia
- Phylum: Arthropoda
- Class: Insecta
- Order: Lepidoptera
- Family: Crambidae
- Genus: Palpita
- Species: P. perunionalis

Binomial name
- Palpita perunionalis Inoue, 1994

Species of moth

Palpita perunionalis is a moth in the family Crambidae. It was described by Hiroshi Inoue in 1994. It is found in China (Guizhou, Yunnan), Thailand, India, Nepal and Vietnam.
