= Palpita diehli =

Scientific classification
- Kingdom: Animalia
- Phylum: Arthropoda
- Class: Insecta
- Order: Lepidoptera
- Family: Crambidae
- Genus: Palpita
- Species: P. diehli

Binomial name
- Palpita diehli Inoue, 1996

Species of moth

Palpita diehli is a moth in the family Crambidae. It was described by Hiroshi Inoue in 1996. It is found in Indonesia (Sumatra).
