= Palpita ocelliferalis =

Scientific classification
- Kingdom: Animalia
- Phylum: Arthropoda
- Class: Insecta
- Order: Lepidoptera
- Family: Crambidae
- Genus: Palpita
- Species: P. ocelliferalis

Binomial name
- Palpita ocelliferalis (Hampson, 1912)

Synonyms
- Glyphodes ocelliferalis Hampson, 1912

Species of moth

Palpita ocelliferalis is a moth in the family Crambidae. It was described by George Hampson in 1912. It is found in the Democratic Republic of the Congo (Equateur, West Kasai, Katanga, North Kivu, Orientale), Kenya, Nigeria and Uganda.
