= Palpita aethrophanes =

Scientific classification
- Domain: Eukaryota
- Kingdom: Animalia
- Phylum: Arthropoda
- Class: Insecta
- Order: Lepidoptera
- Family: Crambidae
- Genus: Palpita
- Species: P. aethrophanes

Binomial name
- Palpita aethrophanes (Meyrick, 1934)

Synonyms
- Margaronia aethrophanes Meyrick, 1934

Species of moth

Palpita aethrophanes is a moth in the family Crambidae. It is found in the Democratic Republic of Congo (North Kivu).
