= Palpita cirralis =

Scientific classification
- Domain: Eukaryota
- Kingdom: Animalia
- Phylum: Arthropoda
- Class: Insecta
- Order: Lepidoptera
- Family: Crambidae
- Genus: Palpita
- Species: P. cirralis

Binomial name
- Palpita cirralis (C. Swinhoe, 1897)

Synonyms
- Sisyrophora cirralis C. Swinhoe, 1897; Palpita cirrhalis Hampson, 1899

Species of moth

Palpita cirralis is a moth in the family Crambidae. It was described by Charles Swinhoe in 1897. It is found on Borneo.
