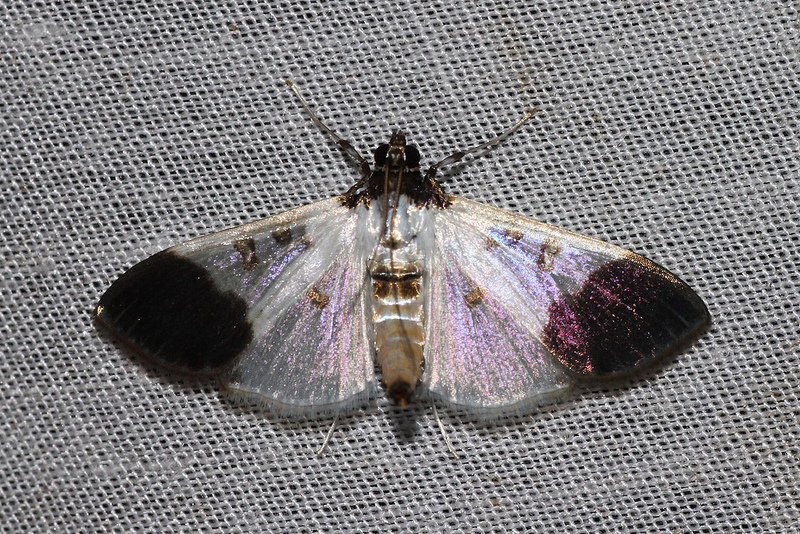

Scientific classification
- Kingdom: Animalia
- Phylum: Arthropoda
- Clade: Pancrustacea
- Class: Insecta
- Order: Lepidoptera
- Family: Crambidae
- Genus: Palpita
- Species: P. nigricollis

Binomial name
- Palpita nigricollis (Snellen, 1895)

Synonyms
- Pitama nigricollis Snellen, 1895

= Palpita nigricollis =

Species of moth

Palpita nigricollis is a moth in the family Crambidae. It is found in Thailand, Cambodia, West Malaysia, Sumatra, Bali, Borneo, Java, Philippines, and Sulawesi. Lowland to montane forests (1400m).
