= Palpita spinosa =

Scientific classification
- Domain: Eukaryota
- Kingdom: Animalia
- Phylum: Arthropoda
- Class: Insecta
- Order: Lepidoptera
- Family: Crambidae
- Genus: Palpita
- Species: P. spinosa

Binomial name
- Palpita spinosa Clayton, 2008

Species of moth

Palpita spinosa is a moth in the family Crambidae. It is found in Fiji.
