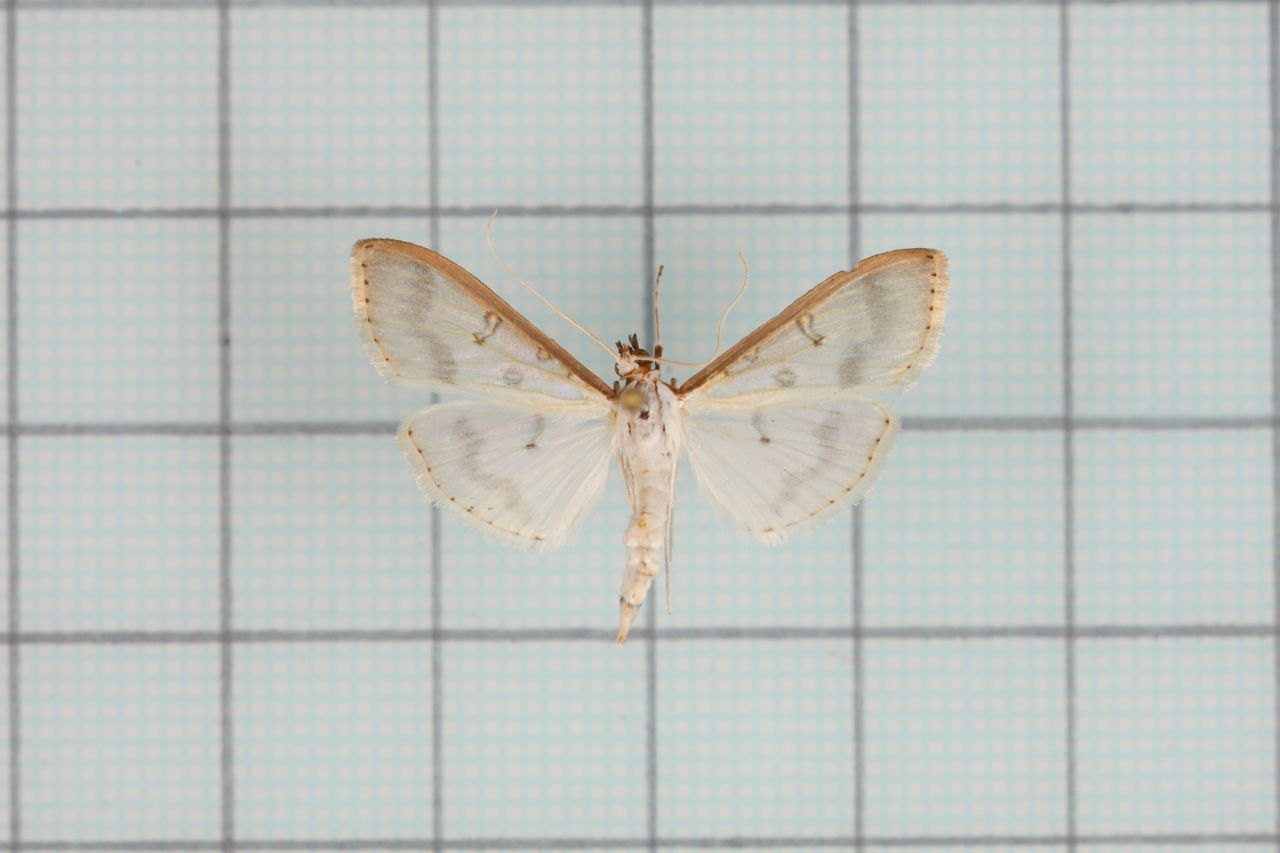

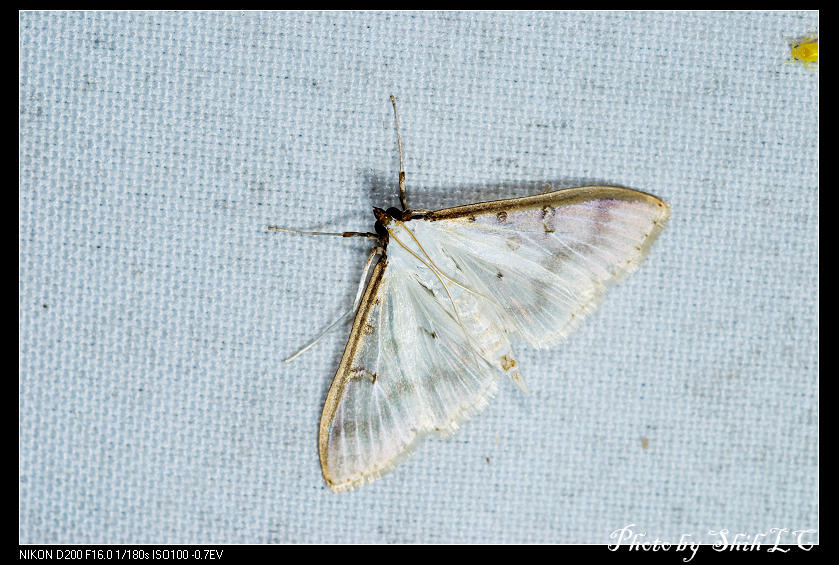

Scientific classification
- Kingdom: Animalia
- Phylum: Arthropoda
- Class: Insecta
- Order: Lepidoptera
- Family: Crambidae
- Genus: Palpita
- Species: P. warrenalis

Binomial name
- Palpita warrenalis (C. Swinhoe, 1894)

Synonyms
- Margaronia warrenalis C. Swinhoe, 1894

= Palpita warrenalis =

Species of moth

Palpita warrenalis is a moth of the family Crambidae described by Charles Swinhoe in 1894. It is found in south-east Asia, including China (Zhejiang, Fujian, Hubei, Hunan, Guangdong, Guangxi, Guizhou), India, Nepal, Indonesia (Sumatra, Java, Bali, Borneo), the Philippines, Vietnam, Papua New Guinea and Taiwan.

The wingspan is 28 mm. Adults are on wing in April.
