= Palpita claralis =

Scientific classification
- Kingdom: Animalia
- Phylum: Arthropoda
- Class: Insecta
- Order: Lepidoptera
- Family: Crambidae
- Genus: Palpita
- Species: P. claralis

Binomial name
- Palpita claralis (Walker, 1866)

Synonyms
- Margaronia claralis Walker, 1866; Botys intactalis Walker, 1866

Species of moth

Palpita claralis is a moth in the family Crambidae. It was described by Francis Walker in 1866. It is found in South Africa and Malawi.
