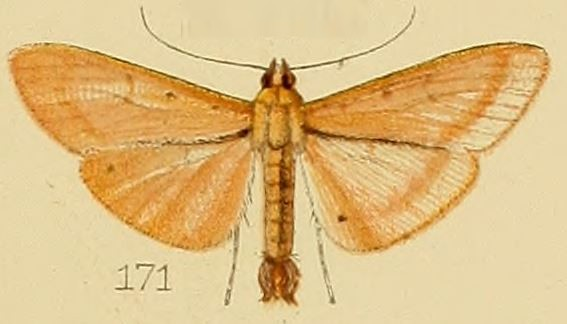

Scientific classification
- Domain: Eukaryota
- Kingdom: Animalia
- Phylum: Arthropoda
- Class: Insecta
- Order: Lepidoptera
- Family: Crambidae
- Genus: Palpita
- Species: P. pudicalis

Binomial name
- Palpita pudicalis (Kenrick, 1907)

Synonyms
- Glyphodes pudicalis Kenrick, 1907

= Palpita pudicalis =

Species of moth

Palpita pudicalis is a species of moth of the family Crambidae. It was described by George Hamilton Kenrick in 1907 and is found in Papua New Guinea.

It has a wingspan of 30 mm.
