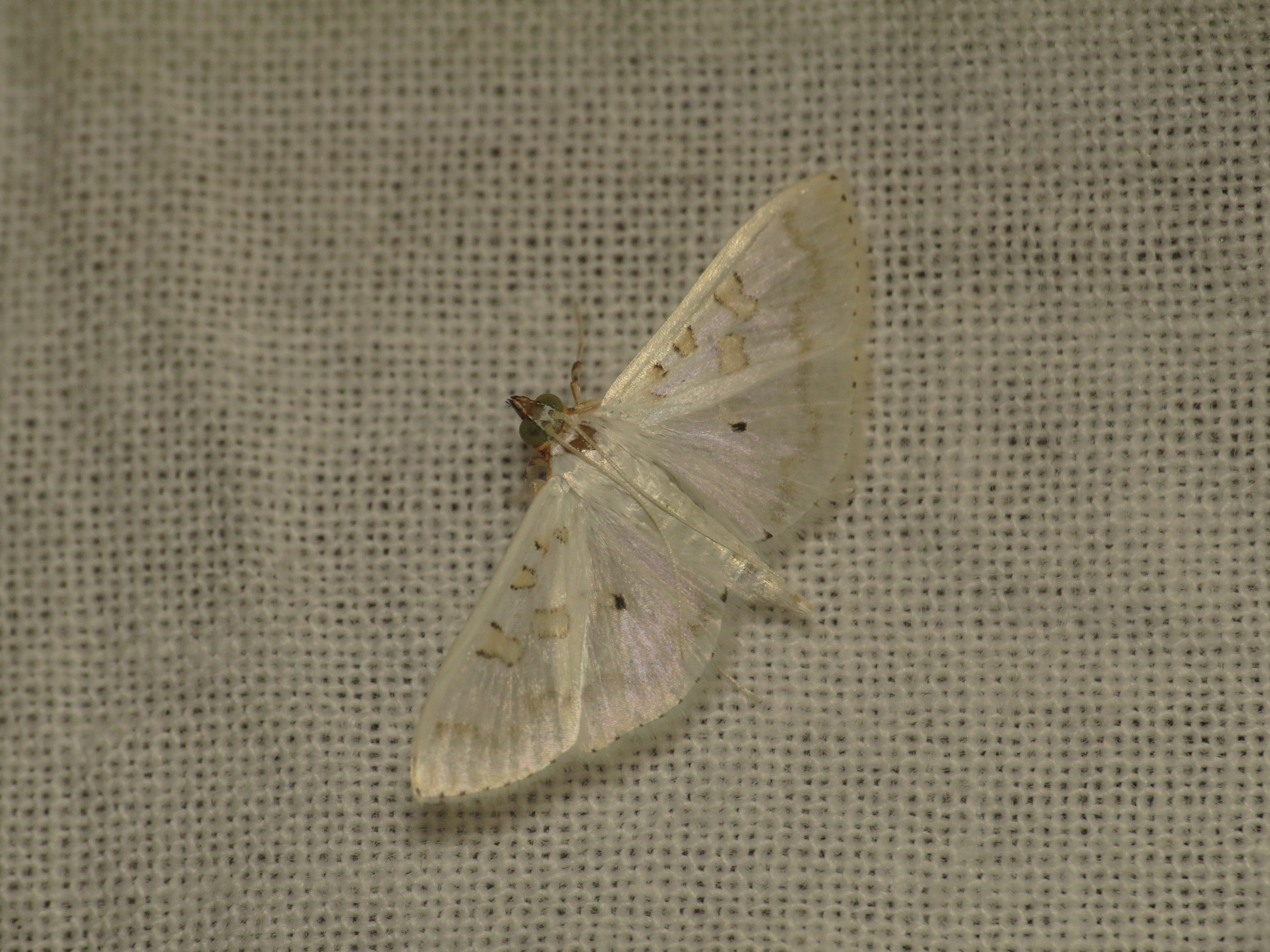

Scientific classification
- Domain: Eukaryota
- Kingdom: Animalia
- Phylum: Arthropoda
- Class: Insecta
- Order: Lepidoptera
- Family: Crambidae
- Genus: Palpita
- Species: P. annulata

Binomial name
- Palpita annulata (Fabricius, 1794)

Synonyms
- Phalaena annulata Fabricius, 1794 (nec. Phalaena annularia Fabricius, 1775); Botys celsalis Walker, 1859; Palpita celsalis; Botys partialis Lederer, 1863; Botys ardealis C. Felder, R. Felder & Rogenhofer, 1875; Palpita ardealis

= Palpita annulata =

Species of moth

Palpita annulata is a moth in the family Crambidae. It was described by Johan Christian Fabricius in 1794. It is found in India (including the Andamans and Nicobar Islands), Sri Lanka, Myanmar, China, Taiwan and Queensland, Australia.

The larvae feed on the foliage of various plants, including Ligustrum quihoui and Ligustrum vicaryi.
