= Palpita pratti =

Scientific classification
- Domain: Eukaryota
- Kingdom: Animalia
- Phylum: Arthropoda
- Class: Insecta
- Order: Lepidoptera
- Family: Crambidae
- Genus: Palpita
- Species: P. pratti

Binomial name
- Palpita pratti (Janse, 1924)

Synonyms
- Margaronia pratti Janse, 1924

Species of moth

Palpita pratti is a moth in the family Crambidae. It is found in Indonesia (Seram and Sumatra) and Australia.

== Subspecies ==
- Palpita pratti pratti (Indonesia: Seram)
- Palpita pratti immajorina (Inoue, 1997) (Indonesia: Sumatra)
