= Palpita inusitata =

Scientific classification
- Kingdom: Animalia
- Phylum: Arthropoda
- Class: Insecta
- Order: Lepidoptera
- Family: Crambidae
- Genus: Palpita
- Species: P. inusitata

Binomial name
- Palpita inusitata (Butler, 1879)

Synonyms
- Margaronia inusitata Butler, 1879

Species of moth

Palpita inusitata is a moth in the family Crambidae. It was described by Arthur Gardiner Butler in 1879. It is found in Japan and China (Zhejiang, Fujian, Hubei, Hunan, Guangdong, Guangxi, Guizhou).
