= Palpita jansei =

Scientific classification
- Domain: Eukaryota
- Kingdom: Animalia
- Phylum: Arthropoda
- Class: Insecta
- Order: Lepidoptera
- Family: Crambidae
- Genus: Palpita
- Species: P. jansei

Binomial name
- Palpita jansei Munroe, 1977

Species of moth

Palpita jansei is a moth in the family Crambidae. It was described by Eugene G. Munroe in 1977. It is found in Papua New Guinea.
