= Palpita spilogramma =

Scientific classification
- Kingdom: Animalia
- Phylum: Arthropoda
- Class: Insecta
- Order: Lepidoptera
- Family: Crambidae
- Genus: Palpita
- Species: P. spilogramma

Binomial name
- Palpita spilogramma (Meyrick, 1934)

Synonyms
- Margaronia spilogramma Meyrick, 1934

Species of moth

Palpita spilogramma is a moth in the family Crambidae. It is found in Fiji.
