= Palpita varii =

Scientific classification
- Domain: Eukaryota
- Kingdom: Animalia
- Phylum: Arthropoda
- Class: Insecta
- Order: Lepidoptera
- Family: Crambidae
- Genus: Palpita
- Species: P. varii

Binomial name
- Palpita varii Munroe, 1977

Species of moth

Palpita varii is a moth in the family Crambidae. It was described by Eugene G. Munroe in 1977. It is found in Seram, Indonesia.
