= Palpita pulverulenta =

Scientific classification
- Kingdom: Animalia
- Phylum: Arthropoda
- Class: Insecta
- Order: Lepidoptera
- Family: Crambidae
- Genus: Palpita
- Species: P. pulverulenta

Binomial name
- Palpita pulverulenta (Hampson, 1918)

Synonyms
- Hapalia pulverulenta Hampson, 1918

Species of moth

Palpita pulverulenta is a moth in the family Crambidae. It was described by George Hampson in 1918. It is found in Sri Lanka.
