= Palpita bonjongalis =

Scientific classification
- Domain: Eukaryota
- Kingdom: Animalia
- Phylum: Arthropoda
- Class: Insecta
- Order: Lepidoptera
- Family: Crambidae
- Genus: Palpita
- Species: P. bonjongalis

Binomial name
- Palpita bonjongalis (Plötz, 1880)

Synonyms
- Eudioptis bonjongalis Plötz, 1880; Margaronia aequorea Meyrick, 1933

Species of moth

Palpita bonjongalis is a moth in the family Crambidae. It is found in Cameroon, the Republic of Congo, the Democratic Republic of Congo (East Kasai, Bas Congo, Kinshasa, North Kivu, Katanga, Orientale) and South Africa.
