= Palpita bambusalis =

Scientific classification
- Domain: Eukaryota
- Kingdom: Animalia
- Phylum: Arthropoda
- Class: Insecta
- Order: Lepidoptera
- Family: Crambidae
- Genus: Palpita
- Species: P. bambusalis

Binomial name
- Palpita bambusalis (Moore, 1888)

Synonyms
- Hapalia bambusalis Moore, 1888

Species of moth

Palpita bambusalis is a moth in the family Crambidae. It was described by Frederic Moore in 1888. It is found in Darjeeling, India.
