= Palpita approximalis =

Scientific classification
- Kingdom: Animalia
- Phylum: Arthropoda
- Class: Insecta
- Order: Lepidoptera
- Family: Crambidae
- Genus: Palpita
- Species: P. approximalis

Binomial name
- Palpita approximalis (Hampson, 1918)

Synonyms
- Margaronia approximalis Hampson, 1918

Species of moth

Palpita approximalis is a moth in the family Crambidae. It is found in Papua New Guinea.
