= Palpita eribotalis =

Scientific classification
- Kingdom: Animalia
- Phylum: Arthropoda
- Class: Insecta
- Order: Lepidoptera
- Family: Crambidae
- Genus: Palpita
- Species: P. eribotalis

Binomial name
- Palpita eribotalis (Walker, 1859)

Synonyms
- Margaronia eribotalis Walker, 1859

Species of moth

Palpita eribotalis is a moth in the family Crambidae. It was described by Francis Walker in 1859. It is found in Honduras.
