= Palpita albifulvata =

Scientific classification
- Domain: Eukaryota
- Kingdom: Animalia
- Phylum: Arthropoda
- Class: Insecta
- Order: Lepidoptera
- Family: Crambidae
- Genus: Palpita
- Species: P. albifulvata

Binomial name
- Palpita albifulvata Kirti & Rose, 1992

Species of moth

Palpita albifulvata is a moth in the family Crambidae. It is found in India (Arunachal Pradesh).
