= Palpita palpifulvata =

Scientific classification
- Domain: Eukaryota
- Kingdom: Animalia
- Phylum: Arthropoda
- Class: Insecta
- Order: Lepidoptera
- Family: Crambidae
- Genus: Palpita
- Species: P. palpifulvata

Binomial name
- Palpita palpifulvata Kirti & Rose, 1992

Species of moth

Palpita palpifulvata is a moth in the family Crambidae. It was described by Jagbir Singh Kirti and H. S. Rose in 1992. It is found in Arunachal Pradesh, India.
