= Palpita sphenocosma =

Scientific classification
- Kingdom: Animalia
- Phylum: Arthropoda
- Class: Insecta
- Order: Lepidoptera
- Family: Crambidae
- Genus: Palpita
- Species: P. sphenocosma

Binomial name
- Palpita sphenocosma (Meyrick, 1894)

Synonyms
- Margaronia sphenocosma Meyrick, 1894

Species of moth

Palpita sphenocosma is a moth in the family Crambidae. It was described by Edward Meyrick in 1894. It is found in Indonesia on Borneo.
