= Palpita seminigralis =

Scientific classification
- Kingdom: Animalia
- Phylum: Arthropoda
- Class: Insecta
- Order: Lepidoptera
- Family: Crambidae
- Genus: Palpita
- Species: P. seminigralis

Binomial name
- Palpita seminigralis (Hampson, 1899)

Synonyms
- Glyphodes seminigralis Hampson, 1899

Species of moth

Palpita seminigralis is a moth in the family Crambidae. It was described by George Hampson in 1899. It is found in Cameroon, the Democratic Republic of the Congo (Kasai-Occidental, Équateur) and Nigeria.
