= Palpita robusta =

Scientific classification
- Domain: Eukaryota
- Kingdom: Animalia
- Phylum: Arthropoda
- Class: Insecta
- Order: Lepidoptera
- Family: Crambidae
- Genus: Palpita
- Species: P. robusta

Binomial name
- Palpita robusta (Moore, 1888)

Synonyms
- Hapalia robusta Moore, 1888

Species of moth

Palpita robusta is a moth in the family Crambidae. It is found in India (Darjeeling).
