= Palpita metallata =

Scientific classification
- Domain: Eukaryota
- Kingdom: Animalia
- Phylum: Arthropoda
- Class: Insecta
- Order: Lepidoptera
- Family: Crambidae
- Genus: Palpita
- Species: P. metallata

Binomial name
- Palpita metallata (Fabricius, 1781)

Synonyms
- Phalaena metallata Fabricius, 1781; Glyphodes ocellata Hampson, 1899; Glyphodes picticaudalis Hampson, 1908

Species of moth

Palpita metallata is a moth in the family Crambidae. It is found in Cameroon, Mayotte, Democratic Republic of Congo (Bas Congo, East Kasai, Orientale), Ghana, Kenya, Nigeria, Sierra Leone, South Africa, Tanzania and Uganda.

The larvae feed on Funtumia species.
