= Palpita syleptalis =

Scientific classification
- Kingdom: Animalia
- Phylum: Arthropoda
- Class: Insecta
- Order: Lepidoptera
- Family: Crambidae
- Genus: Palpita
- Species: P. syleptalis

Binomial name
- Palpita syleptalis (Hampson, 1899)

Synonyms
- Glyphodes syleptalis Hampson, 1899

Species of moth

Palpita syleptalis is a moth in the family Crambidae. It was described by George Hampson in 1899. It is found in Peru.
