= Palpita phaealis =

Scientific classification
- Kingdom: Animalia
- Phylum: Arthropoda
- Class: Insecta
- Order: Lepidoptera
- Family: Crambidae
- Genus: Palpita
- Species: P. phaealis

Binomial name
- Palpita phaealis (Hampson, 1913)

Synonyms
- Pionea phaealis Hampson, 1913

Species of moth

Palpita phaealis is a moth in the family Crambidae. It was described by George Hampson in 1913. It is found in Kenya.
