= Palpita conclusalis =

Scientific classification
- Kingdom: Animalia
- Phylum: Arthropoda
- Class: Insecta
- Order: Lepidoptera
- Family: Crambidae
- Genus: Palpita
- Species: P. conclusalis

Binomial name
- Palpita conclusalis (Walker, 1866)

Synonyms
- Glyphodes conclusalis Walker, 1866

Species of moth

Palpita conclusalis is a moth in the family Crambidae. It was described by Francis Walker in 1866. It is found in India.
