= Palpita pajnii =

Scientific classification
- Kingdom: Animalia
- Phylum: Arthropoda
- Class: Insecta
- Order: Lepidoptera
- Family: Crambidae
- Genus: Palpita
- Species: P. pajnii

Binomial name
- Palpita pajnii Kirti & Rose, 1992

Species of moth

Palpita pajnii is a moth in the family Crambidae. It was described by Jagbir Singh Kirti and H. S. Rose in 1992. It is found in China (Guangdong, Guangxi, Hainan, Guizhou, Yunnan), Taiwan, Vietnam, Thailand, Myanmar, Indonesia (Sumatra, Sulawesi, Java, Borneo), the Philippines, India, Nepal, Australia (Queensland), Norfolk Island and Papua New Guinea.
