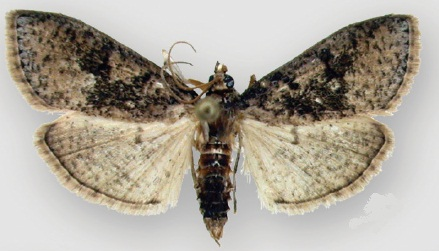

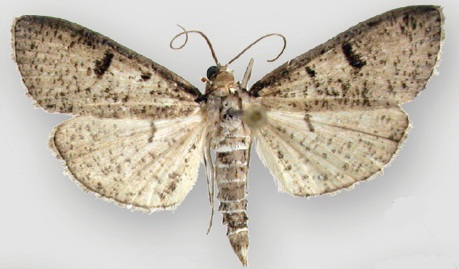

Scientific classification
- Kingdom: Animalia
- Phylum: Arthropoda
- Clade: Pancrustacea
- Class: Insecta
- Order: Lepidoptera
- Family: Crambidae
- Genus: Palpita
- Species: P. maritima

Binomial name
- Palpita maritima Sullivan & Solis, 2013

= Palpita maritima =

Species of moth

Palpita maritima is a moth in the family Crambidae. The species was first described by J. Bolling Sullivan and Maria Alma Solis in 2013. It is found in the United States in Alabama, North Carolina (from Carteret County south to Brunswick County) and Florida. The habitat consists of coastal maritime forests.

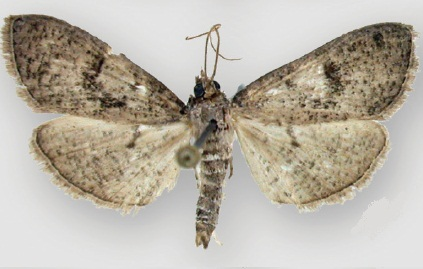

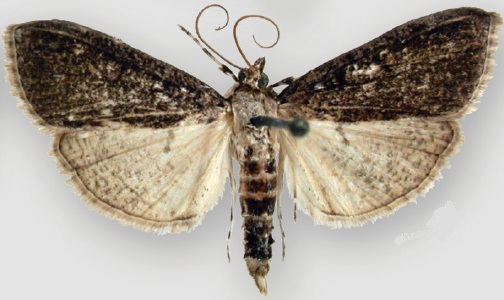

The wingspan is 29 mm. The forewing has a slightly rounded apex. The ground color is brown with a mixture of chocolate and fuscous scales. The orbicular and reniform spots are well marked. The hindwings are fuscous and less patterned than the forewings. The underside of the wings is white and less patterned, but the orbicular and reniform spots are visible. Adults have been recorded from late March to August.

The larvae probably feed on Osmanthus americana.

== Etymology ==
The name refers to the habitat type, coastal maritime forest, where the species is most abundant in the spring.
