= Palpita fraterna =

Scientific classification
- Kingdom: Animalia
- Phylum: Arthropoda
- Class: Insecta
- Order: Lepidoptera
- Family: Crambidae
- Genus: Palpita
- Species: P. fraterna

Binomial name
- Palpita fraterna (Moore, 1888)

Synonyms
- Margaronia fraterna Moore, 1888

Species of moth

Palpita fraterna is a moth in the family Crambidae. It was described by Frederic Moore in 1888. It is found in India, Nepal, Zhejiang, China and Cambodia.
