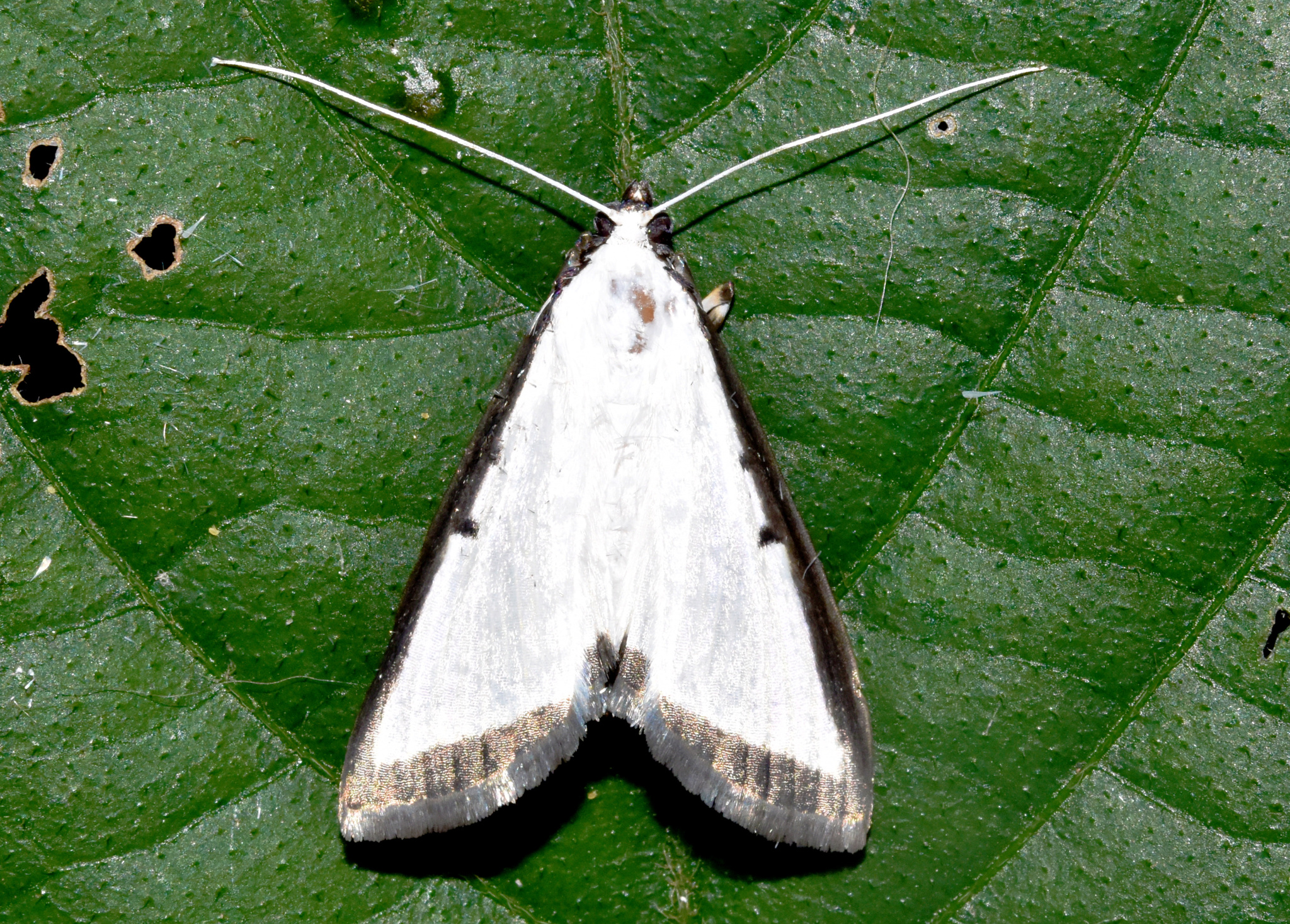
- Palpita elealis

Scientific classification
- Kingdom: Animalia
- Phylum: Arthropoda
- Class: Insecta
- Order: Lepidoptera
- Family: Crambidae
- Genus: Palpita
- Species: P. elealis

Binomial name
- Palpita elealis (Walker, 1859)

Synonyms
- Tobata elealis Walker, 1859; Cryptographis rogenhoferi Lederer, 1863; Glyphodes angustimargo Warren, 1914; Eudioptis beninalis Plötz, 1880; Phakellura peridromella Mabille, 1881

= Palpita elealis =

Species of moth

Palpita elealis is a moth in the family Crambidae. It was described by Francis Walker in 1859.

== Distribution ==
It is found in Cameroon, the Republic of the Congo, the Democratic Republic of the Congo, Ghana, Ivory Coast, Sierra Leone, South Africa, São Tomé and Príncipe, the Gambia, Zambia and Zimbabwe.

The larvae feed on Rauvolfia vomitoria and Tabernanthe species.
