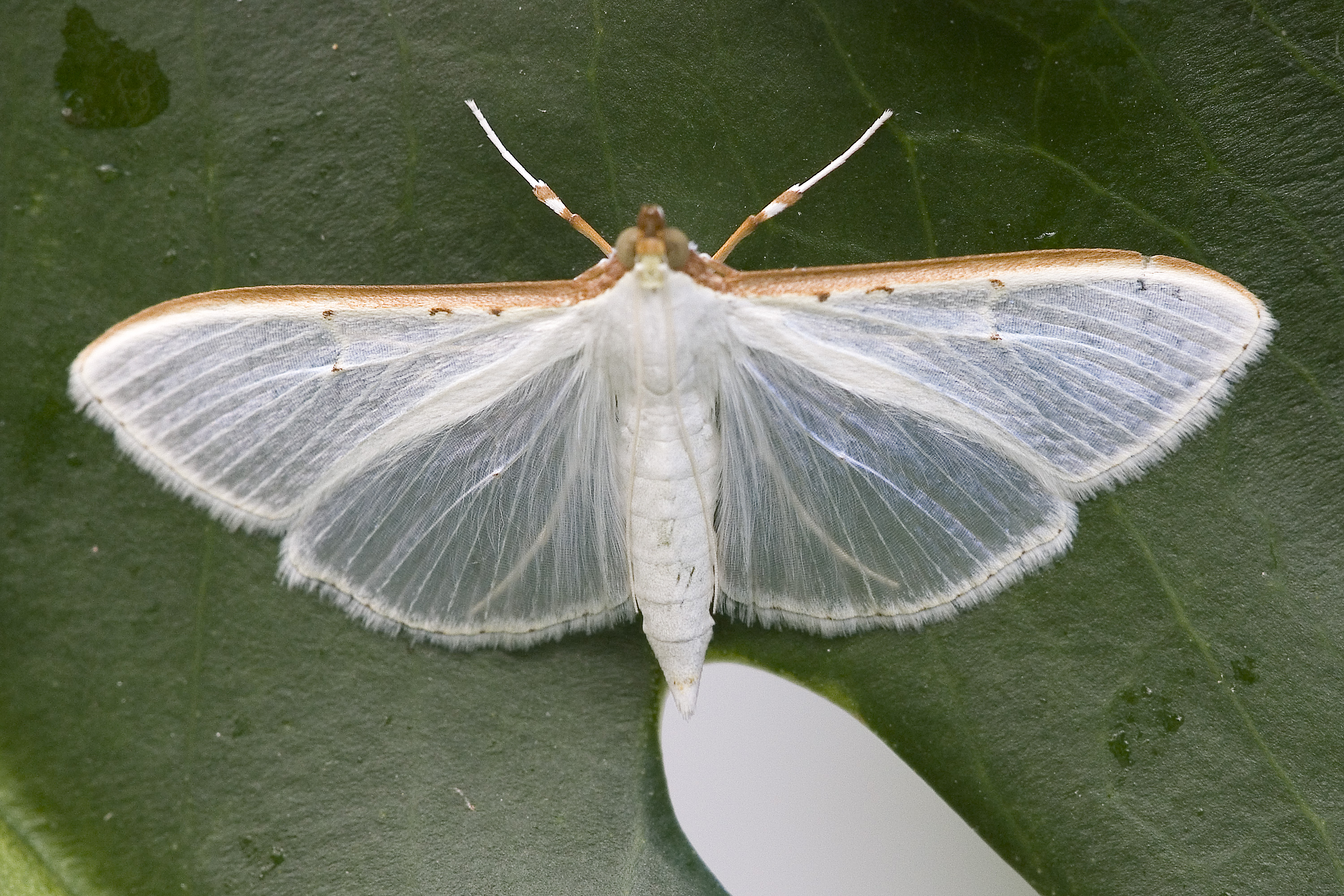
- Palpita vitrealis

Scientific classification
- Kingdom: Animalia
- Phylum: Arthropoda
- Clade: Pancrustacea
- Class: Insecta
- Order: Lepidoptera
- Family: Crambidae
- Tribe: Margaroniini
- Genus: Palpita; Hübner, 1808

Synonyms
- Apyrausta Amsel, 1951; Conchia Hübner, 1821; Cryptographis Lederer, 1863; Hapalia Hübner, 1818; Hvidodes Swinhoe, 1900; Ledereria Marschall, 1875; Margarodes Guenée, 1854; Margaronia Hübner, 1825; Paradosis Zeller, 1852; Sarothronota Lederer, 1863; Sebunta Walker, 1863; Sylora Swinhoe, 1900; Tobata Walker, 1859

= Palpita =

Genus of moths

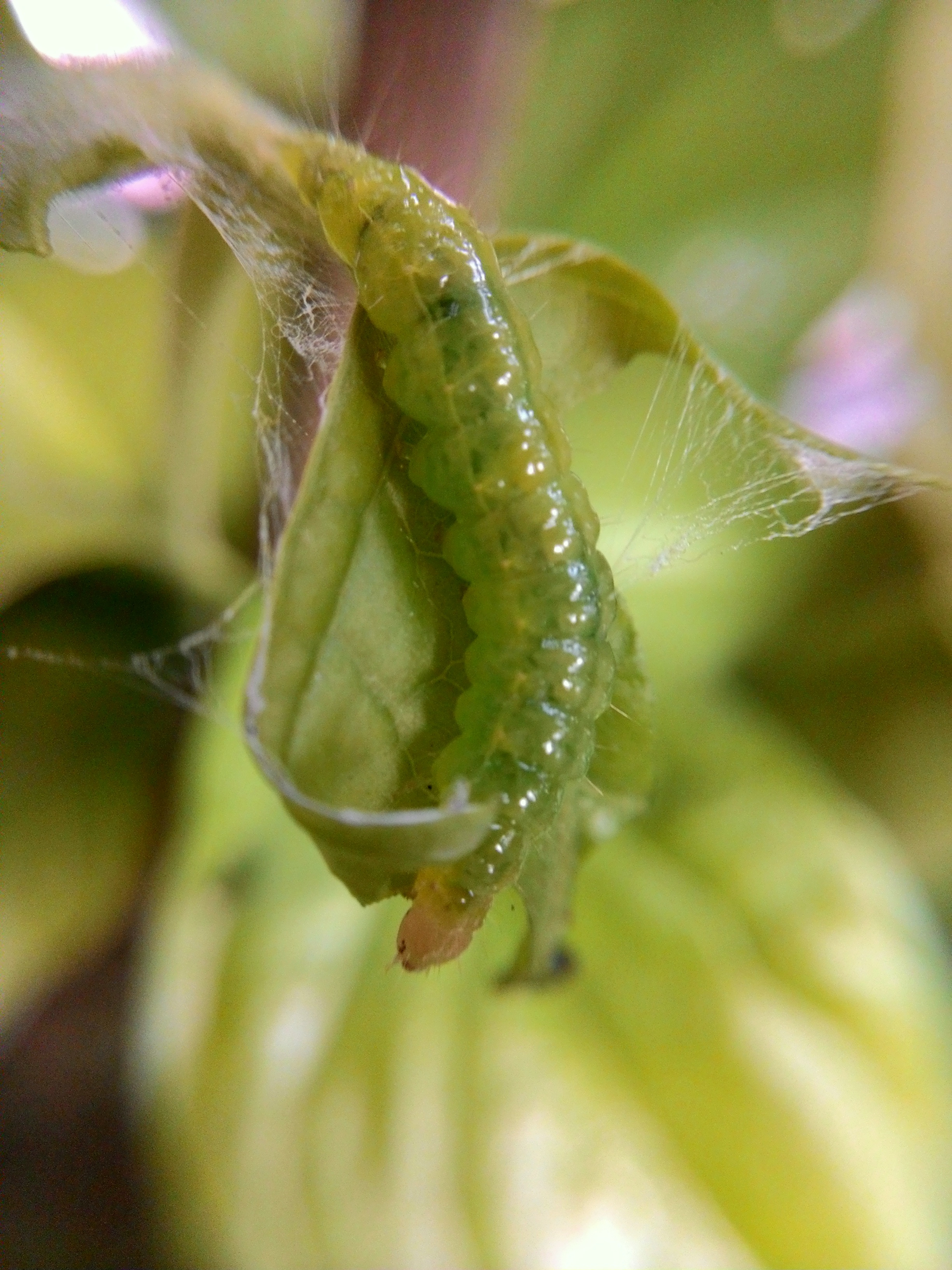
Palpita vitrealis, caterpillar

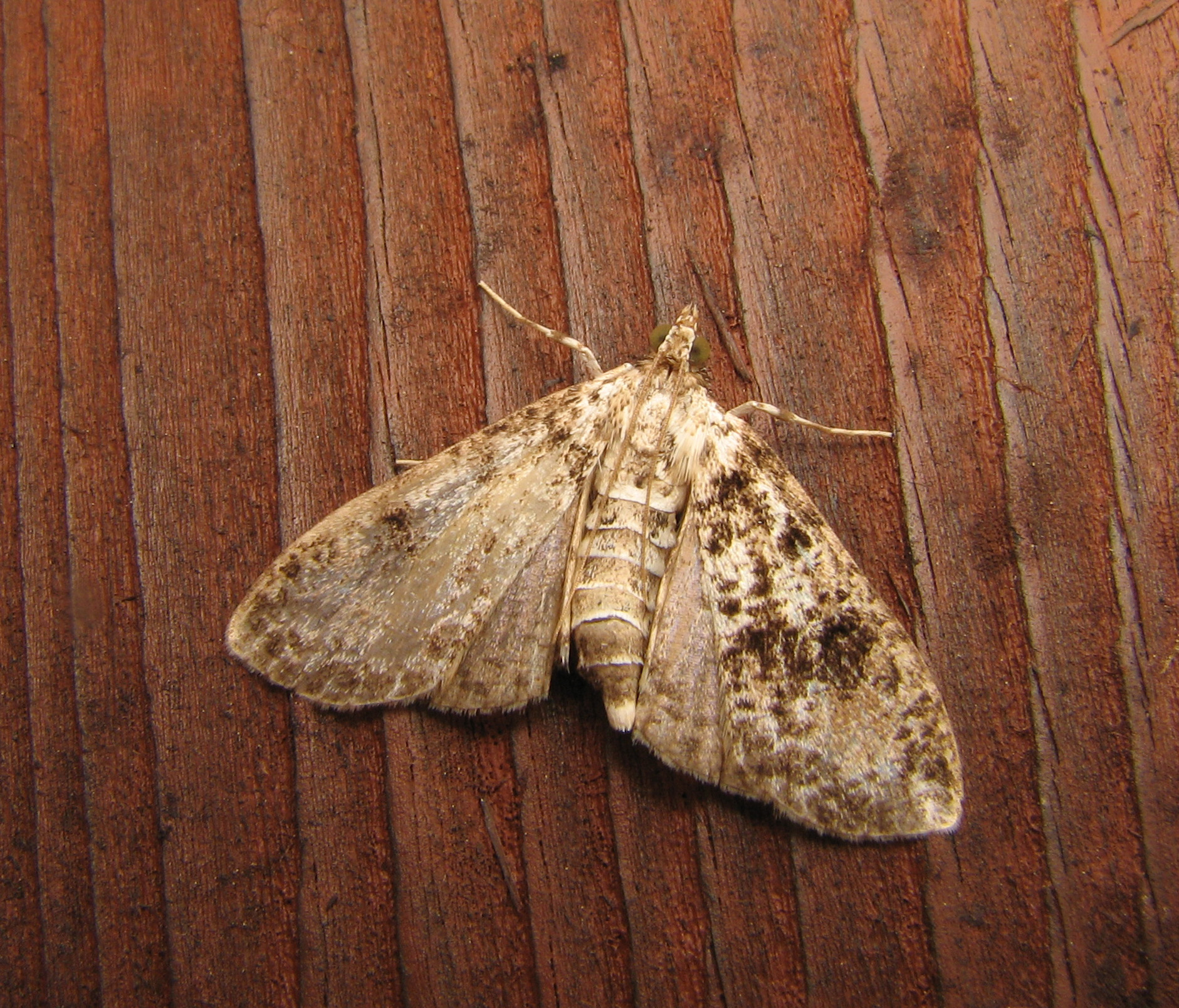
Palpita magniferalis

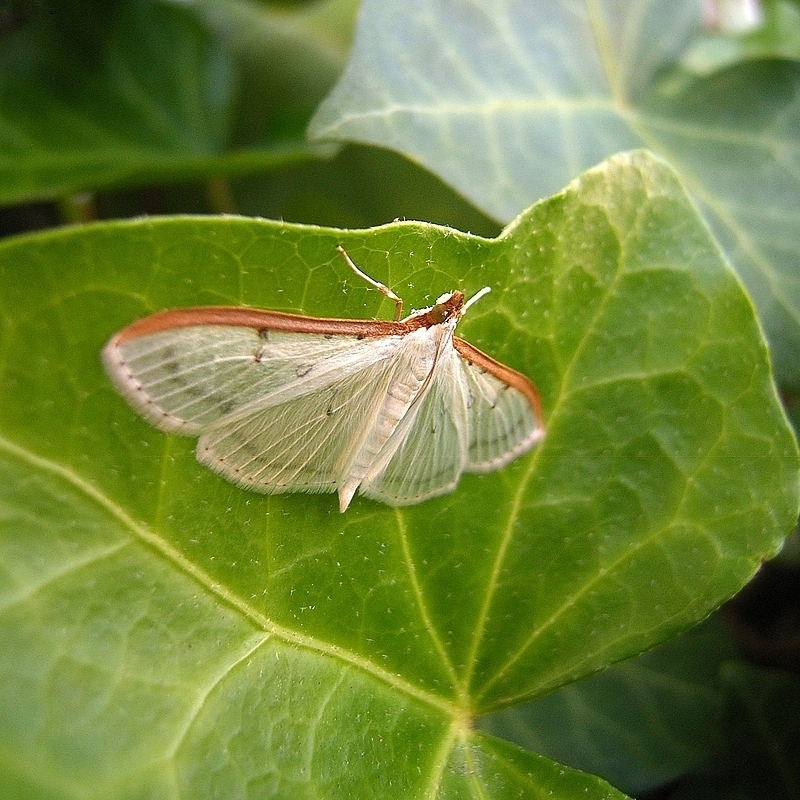
Palpita nigropunctalis

Palpita is a genus of moths of the family Crambidae. Members of the moth genus Stemorrhages may be very similar in appearance.

== Species ==
- Palpita aenescentalis Munroe, 1952
- Palpita aethrophanes (Meyrick, 1934)
- Palpita albifulvata Kirti & Rose, 1992
- Palpita angusta Inoue, 1997
- Palpita annulata (Fabricius, 1794)
- Palpita annulifer Inoue, 1996
- Palpita approximalis (Hampson, 1918)
- Palpita argoleuca (Meyrick, 1938)
- Palpita arsaltealis (Walker, 1859)
- Palpita asiaticalis Inoue, 1994
- Palpita aureolina Inoue, 1997
- Palpita australica Inoue, 1996
- Palpita austrannulata Inoue, 1996
- Palpita austrounionalis Inoue, 1997
- Palpita bakerialis (Schaus, 1927)
- Palpita bambusalis (Moore, 1888)
- Palpita bicornuta Inoue, 1996
- Palpita bonjongalis
- Palpita braziliensis Munroe, 1959
- Palpita brevimarginata (Janse, 1924)
- Palpita candicantis Inoue, 1997
- Palpita candidalis (Dognin, 1904)
- Palpita candidata Inoue, 1996
- Palpita carbonifusalis (Hampson, 1918)
- Palpita cincinnatalis Munroe, 1952
- Palpita cirralis (Swinhoe, 1897)
- Palpita cirrhopis (Meyrick, 1937)
- Palpita citrina (Druce, 1902)
- Palpita claralis (Walker, 1866)
- Palpita conclusalis (Walker, 1866)
- Palpita conistolalis (Hampson, 1918)
- Palpita contrangusta Inoue, 1997
- Palpita crococosta Inoue, 1997
- Palpita curiosa Inoue, 1996
- Palpita curvilinea (Janse, 1924)
- Palpita curvispina Zhang & Li, 2005
- Palpita diehli Inoue, 1996
- Palpita disjunctalis Inoue, 1999
- Palpita dispersalis Inoue, 1996
- Palpita elealis (Walker, 1859)
- Palpita ensiforma Inoue, 1996
- Palpita eribotalis (Walker, 1859)
- Palpita estebanalis (Schaus, 1920)
- Palpita eupilosalis Inoue, 1997
- Palpita flegia (Cramer, 1777)
- Palpita florensis Inoue, 1996
- Palpita forficifera Munroe, 1959
- Palpita fraterna (Moore, 1888)
- Palpita freemanalis Munroe, 1952
- Palpita gracialis (Hulst, 1886)
- Palpita grandifalcata Inoue, 1997
- Palpita griseofascialis Inoue, 1997
- Palpita hexcornutialis Kirti & Rose, 1992
- Palpita hollowayi Inoue, 1997
- Palpita homalia Inoue, 1996
- Palpita horakae Inoue, 1997
- Palpita horocrates (Meyrick, 1937)
- Palpita hyaloptila (Turner, 1915)
- Palpita hypohomalia Inoue, 1996
- Palpita hypomelas (Hampson, 1899)
- Palpita illibalis (Hübner, 1818)
- Palpita illustrata Inoue, 1997
- Palpita inconspicua Inoue, 1996
- Palpita indannulata Inoue, 1996
- Palpita indistans (Moore, 1888)
- Palpita inexpectalis Inoue, 1996
- Palpita inusitata (Butler, 1879)
- Palpita irroratalis (Hampson, 1912)
- Palpita isoscelalis (Guenée, 1854)
- Palpita jacobsalis (Marion & Viette, 1956)
- Palpita jairusalis (Walker, 1859)
- Palpita jansei Munroe, 1977
- Palpita javanica Inoue, 1997
- Palpita junctalis Inoue, 1997
- Palpita kimballi Munroe, 1959
- Palpita kiminensis Kirti & Rose, 1992
- Palpita laciniata Inoue, 1997
- Palpita lanceolata Inoue, 1996
- Palpita lautopennis Inoue, 1997
- Palpita limbata (Butler, 1886)
- Palpita lobisignalis (Hampson, 1918)
- Palpita longissima Inoue, 1996
- Palpita luzonica Inoue, 1996
- Palpita magniferalis (Walker, 1861)
- Palpita majorina Inoue, 1997
- Palpita margaritacea Inoue, 1997
- Palpita marginalis Inoue, 1997
- Palpita maritima Sullivan & Solis, 2013
- Palpita masuii Inoue, 1996
- Palpita melanapicalis Inoue, 1996
- Palpita metallata (Fabricius, 1781)
- Palpita micronesica Inoue, 1997
- Palpita microptera Inoue, 1996
- Palpita minuscula Inoue, 1996
- Palpita monomaculalis Inoue, 1997
- Palpita munroei Inoue, 1996
- Palpita nigricollis (Snellen, 1895)
- Palpita nigropunctalis (Bremer, 1864)
- Palpita nonfraterna Inoue, 1996
- Palpita notabilis Inoue, 1997
- Palpita oblita (Moore, 1888)
- Palpita obsolescens Inoue, 1997
- Palpita ocelliferalis (Hampson, 1912)
- Palpita ochrocosta Inoue, 1996
- Palpita pajnii Kirti & Rose, 1992
- Palpita pallescens Inoue, 1996
- Palpita palpifulvata Kirti & Rose, 1992
- Palpita pandurata Inoue, 1996
- Palpita parvifraterna Inoue, 1999
- Palpita paulianalis (Marion & Viette, 1956)
- Palpita perlucidalis Inoue, 1999
- Palpita persicalis (Amsel, 1951)
- Palpita persimilis Munroe, 1959
- Palpita perunionalis Inoue, 1994
- Palpita phaealis (Hampson, 1913)
- Palpita picticostalis (Hampson, 1896)
- Palpita pilosalis Inoue, 1997
- Palpita postundulata Inoue, 1997
- Palpita pratti (Janse, 1924)
- Palpita pudicalis (Kenrick, 1907)
- Palpita pulverulenta (Hampson, 1918)
- Palpita punctalis (Warren, 1896)
- Palpita quadristigmalis (Guenée, 1854)
- Palpita quasiannulata Inoue, 1996
- Palpita rhodocosta Inoue, 1997
- Palpita roboralis Inoue, 1996
- Palpita robusta (Moore, 1888)
- Palpita rotundalis Inoue, 1997
- Palpita seitzialis (E. Hering, 1903)
- Palpita sejunctalis Inoue, 1997
- Palpita semifraterna Inoue, 1996
- Palpita semimicroptera Inoue, 1996
- Palpita seminigralis (Hampson, 1899)
- Palpita shafferi Inoue, 1996
- Palpita simplicissima Inoue, 1997
- Palpita sphenocosma (Meyrick, 1894)
- Palpita spilogramma (Meyrick, 1934)
- Palpita spinosa Clayton, 2008
- Palpita stenocraspis
- Palpita subillustrata Inoue, 1997
- Palpita submarginalis (Walker, 1866)
- Palpita syleptalis (Hampson, 1899)
- Palpita tenuijuxta Inoue, 1996
- Palpita travassosi Munroe, 1959
- Palpita trifurcata Munroe, 1959
- Palpita triopis (Hampson, 1912)
- Palpita tsisabiensis Maes, 2004
- Palpita uedai Inoue, 1997
- Palpita varii Munroe, 1977
- Palpita venatalis (Schaus, 1920)
- Palpita viettei Munroe, 1959
- Palpita viriditinctalis (Hampson, 1918)
- Palpita vitiensis Clayton, 2008
- Palpita vitrealis (Rossi, 1794)
- Palpita warrenalis (Swinhoe, 1894)
- Palpita xanthyalinalis (Hampson, 1899)

== Former species ==
- Palpita aequorea (Meyrick, 1933)
- Palpita ardealis (C. Felder, R. Felder & Rogenhofer, 1875)
- Palpita atrisquamalis (Hampson, 1912)
- Palpita caecigena (Meyrick, 1933)
- Palpita celsalis (Walker, 1859)
- Palpita guttulosa (Walker, 1863)
- Palpita iospora (Meyrick, 1936)
- Palpita marginata (Hampson, 1893)
- Palpita rubritactalis (Hampson, 1918)
- Palpita schroederi (Strand, 1912)
- Palpita tritonalis (Snellen, 1895)

== Status unknown ==
- Palpita nivea (Linnaeus, 1767), originally described as Phalaena (Noctua) nivea from either Norway or South America.
