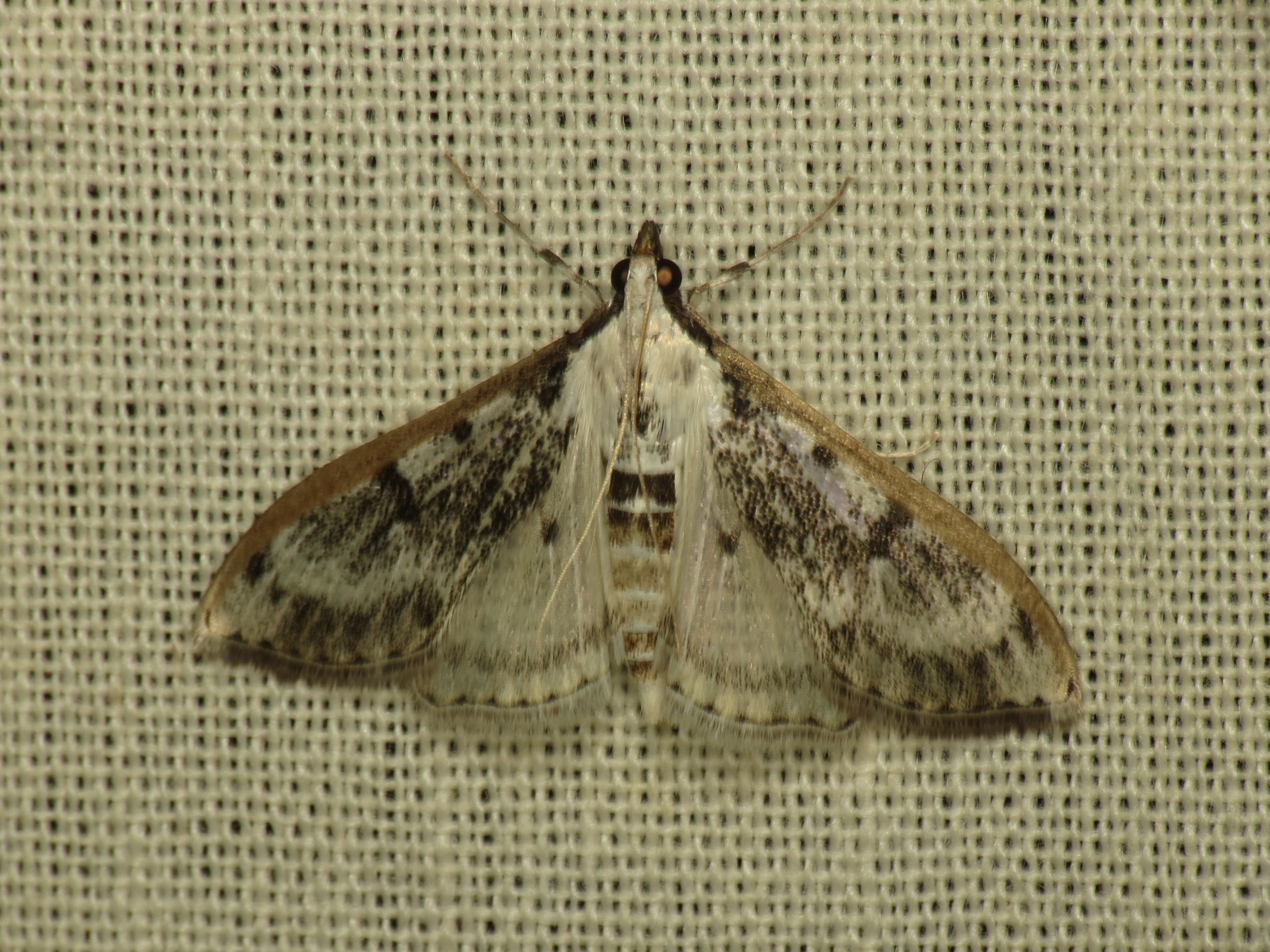

Scientific classification
- Domain: Eukaryota
- Kingdom: Animalia
- Phylum: Arthropoda
- Class: Insecta
- Order: Lepidoptera
- Family: Crambidae
- Genus: Palpita
- Species: P. gracialis

Binomial name
- Palpita gracialis (Hulst, 1886)

Synonyms
- Glyphodes gracialis Hulst, 1886; Botis gracilalis; Glyphodes atrisquamalis Hampson, 1912; Palpita atrisquamalis

= Palpita gracialis =

Species of moth

Palpita gracialis, the gracile palpita moth, is a moth of the family Crambidae. It is found in North America, from California to Texas and Oklahoma.

The length of the forewings is 10-12.5 mm.
