= Palpita submarginalis =

Scientific classification
- Kingdom: Animalia
- Phylum: Arthropoda
- Class: Insecta
- Order: Lepidoptera
- Family: Crambidae
- Genus: Palpita
- Species: P. submarginalis

Binomial name
- Palpita submarginalis (Walker, 1866)

Synonyms
- Botys submarginalis Walker, 1866; Margaronia trilocularis Meyrick, 1938

Species of moth

Palpita submarginalis is a moth in the family Crambidae. It was described by Francis Walker in 1866. It is found in Malaysia and Indonesia (Java).
