= Palpita stenocraspis =

Scientific classification
- Domain: Eukaryota
- Kingdom: Animalia
- Phylum: Arthropoda
- Class: Insecta
- Order: Lepidoptera
- Family: Crambidae
- Genus: Palpita
- Species: P. stenocraspis

Binomial name
- Palpita stenocraspis (Butler, 1898)

Synonyms
- Glyphodes stenocraspis Butler, 1898; Glyphodes schroederi Strand, 1912

Species of moth

Palpita stenocraspis is a moth in the family Crambidae. It is found in Kenya and South Africa.
