= Palpita irroratalis =

Scientific classification
- Kingdom: Animalia
- Phylum: Arthropoda
- Class: Insecta
- Order: Lepidoptera
- Family: Crambidae
- Genus: Palpita
- Species: P. irroratalis

Binomial name
- Palpita irroratalis (Hampson, 1912)

Synonyms
- Glyphodes irroratalis Hampson, 1912

Species of moth

Palpita irroratalis is a moth in the family Crambidae. It was described by George Hampson in 1912. It is found in Kenya.
