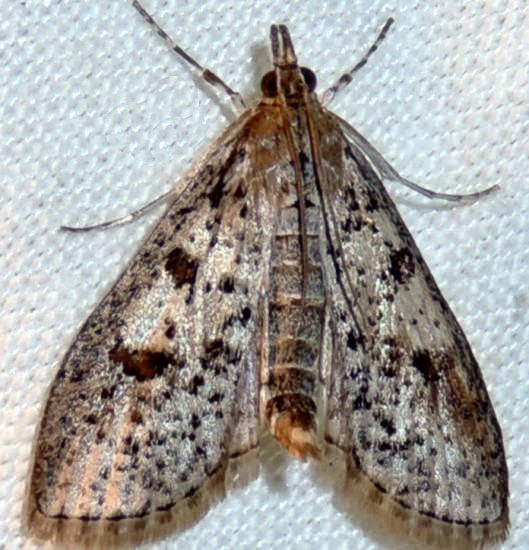

Scientific classification
- Domain: Eukaryota
- Kingdom: Animalia
- Phylum: Arthropoda
- Class: Insecta
- Order: Lepidoptera
- Family: Crambidae
- Genus: Palpita
- Species: P. aenescentalis

Binomial name
- Palpita aenescentalis Munroe, 1952

= Palpita aenescentalis =

Species of moth

Palpita aenescentalis is a moth in the family Crambidae. It was described by Eugene G. Munroe in 1952. It is found in North America, where it has been recorded from Illinois, Indiana, Maine, Maryland, North Carolina, North Dakota, Ohio, Oklahoma, Ontario, Quebec, South Carolina, Tennessee, Virginia and Wisconsin.
