= Palpita triopis =

Scientific classification
- Kingdom: Animalia
- Phylum: Arthropoda
- Class: Insecta
- Order: Lepidoptera
- Family: Crambidae
- Genus: Palpita
- Species: P. triopis

Binomial name
- Palpita triopis (Hampson, 1912)

Synonyms
- Glyphodes triopis Hampson, 1912

Species of moth

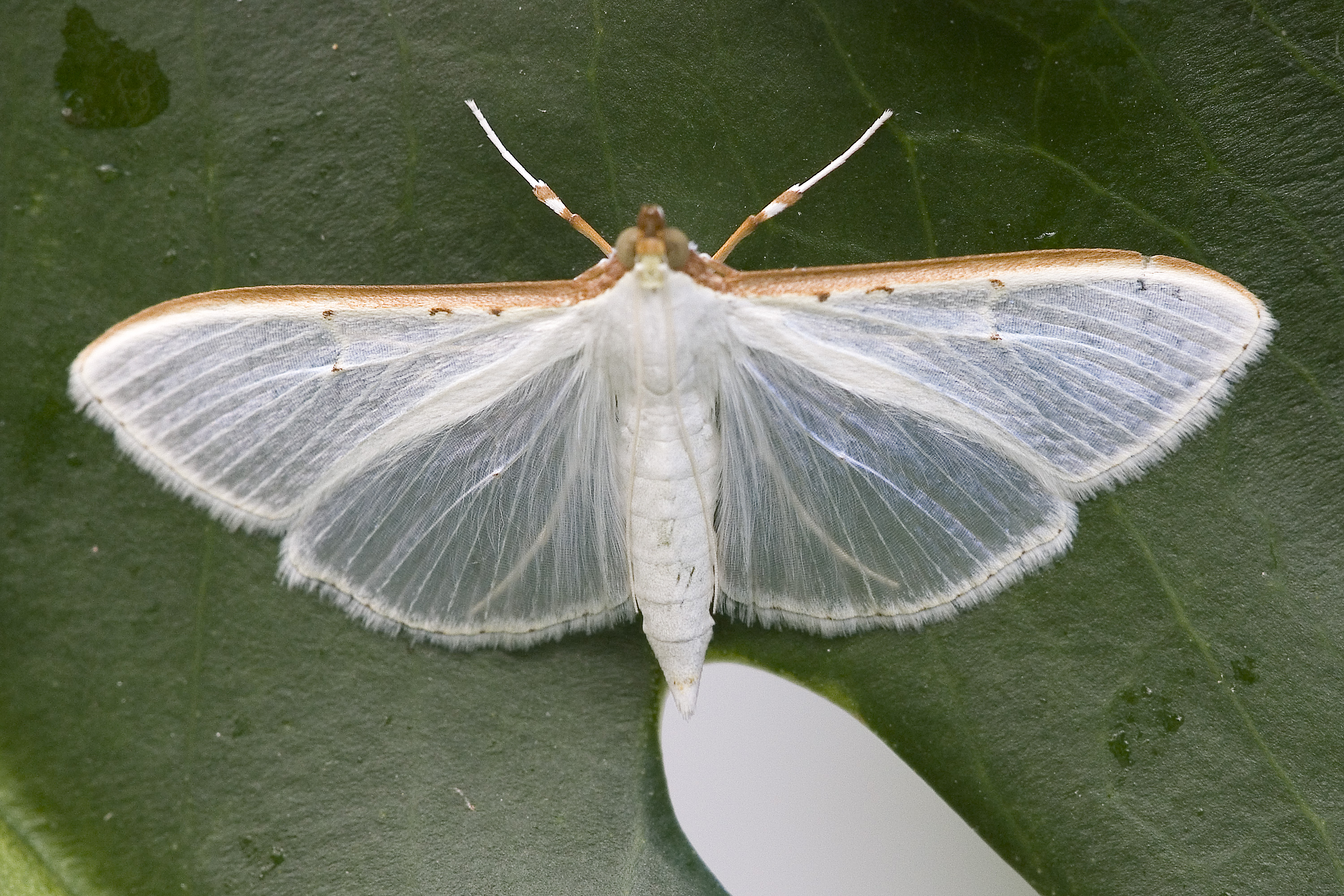
Palpita Vitrealis

Palpita triopis is a moth in the family Crambidae. It was described by George Hampson in 1912. It is found in Papua New Guinea.
