= Palpita brevimarginata =

Scientific classification
- Domain: Eukaryota
- Kingdom: Animalia
- Phylum: Arthropoda
- Class: Insecta
- Order: Lepidoptera
- Family: Crambidae
- Genus: Palpita
- Species: P. brevimarginata

Binomial name
- Palpita brevimarginata (Janse, 1924)

Synonyms
- Margaronia brevimarginata Janse, 1924

Species of moth

Palpita brevimarginata is a moth in the family Crambidae. It was described by Anthonie Johannes Theodorus Janse in 1924. It is found in Seram, Indonesia.
