= Palpita tsisabiensis =

Scientific classification
- Domain: Eukaryota
- Kingdom: Animalia
- Phylum: Arthropoda
- Class: Insecta
- Order: Lepidoptera
- Family: Crambidae
- Genus: Palpita
- Species: P. tsisabiensis

Binomial name
- Palpita tsisabiensis Maes, 2004

Species of moth

Palpita tsisabiensis is a moth in the family Crambidae. It is found in Namibia.
