= Palpita seitzialis =

Scientific classification
- Domain: Eukaryota
- Kingdom: Animalia
- Phylum: Arthropoda
- Class: Insecta
- Order: Lepidoptera
- Family: Crambidae
- Genus: Palpita
- Species: P. seitzialis

Binomial name
- Palpita seitzialis (E. Hering, 1903)

Synonyms
- Margaronia seitzialis E. Hering, 1903

Species of moth

Palpita seitzialis is a moth in the family Crambidae. It was described by Hering in 1903. It is found in Brazil (Santos).
