= Palpita estebanalis =

Scientific classification
- Domain: Eukaryota
- Kingdom: Animalia
- Phylum: Arthropoda
- Class: Insecta
- Order: Lepidoptera
- Family: Crambidae
- Genus: Palpita
- Species: P. estebanalis

Binomial name
- Palpita estebanalis (Schaus, 1920)

Synonyms
- Pilocrocis estebanalis Schaus, 1920

Species of moth

Palpita estebanalis is a moth in the family Crambidae. It was described by Schaus in 1920. It is found in Venezuela.
