= Palpita jairusalis =

Scientific classification
- Kingdom: Animalia
- Phylum: Arthropoda
- Class: Insecta
- Order: Lepidoptera
- Family: Crambidae
- Genus: Palpita
- Species: P. jairusalis

Binomial name
- Palpita jairusalis (Walker, 1859)

Synonyms
- Margaronia jairusalis Walker, 1859

Species of moth

Palpita jairusalis is a moth in the family Crambidae. It was described by Francis Walker in 1859. It is found in Venezuela.
