= Palpita hypomelas =

Scientific classification
- Kingdom: Animalia
- Phylum: Arthropoda
- Class: Insecta
- Order: Lepidoptera
- Family: Crambidae
- Genus: Palpita
- Species: P. hypomelas

Binomial name
- Palpita hypomelas (Hampson, 1899)

Synonyms
- Glyphodes hypomelas Hampson, 1899

Species of moth

Palpita hypomelas is a moth in the family Crambidae. It is found in Papua New Guinea, where it has been recorded from the D'Entrecasteaux Islands (Fergusson Island).
