= Palpita kiminensis =

Scientific classification
- Kingdom: Animalia
- Phylum: Arthropoda
- Class: Insecta
- Order: Lepidoptera
- Family: Crambidae
- Genus: Palpita
- Species: P. kiminensis

Binomial name
- Palpita kiminensis Kirti & Rose, 1992

Species of moth

Palpita kiminensis is a moth in the family Crambidae. It was described by Jagbir Singh Kirti and H. S. Rose in 1992. It is found in north-eastern India, China (Hainan, Yunnan), Nepal, Myanmar, Thailand, Vietnam, Borneo, Sumatra and northern Australia.
