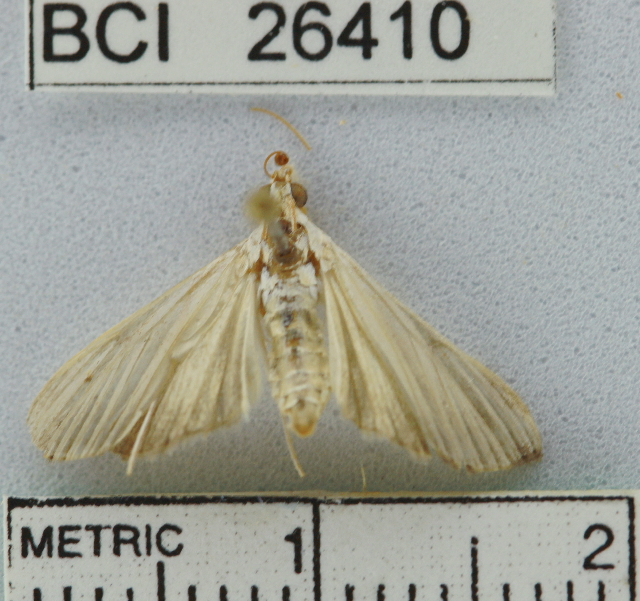

Scientific classification
- Domain: Eukaryota
- Kingdom: Animalia
- Phylum: Arthropoda
- Class: Insecta
- Order: Lepidoptera
- Family: Crambidae
- Genus: Palpita
- Species: P. venatalis

Binomial name
- Palpita venatalis (Schaus, 1920)

Synonyms
- Margaronia venatalis Schaus, 1920

= Palpita venatalis =

Species of moth

Palpita venatalis is a moth in the family Crambidae. It is found in Guatemala, Costa Rica and Panama.
