= Palpita paulianalis =

Scientific classification
- Kingdom: Animalia
- Phylum: Arthropoda
- Class: Insecta
- Order: Lepidoptera
- Family: Crambidae
- Genus: Palpita
- Species: P. paulianalis

Binomial name
- Palpita paulianalis (Marion & Viette, 1956)

Synonyms
- Diaphania paulianalis Marion & Viette, 1956

Species of moth

Palpita paulianalis is a moth in the family Crambidae. It is found in Madagascar.
