= Palpita isoscelalis =

Scientific classification
- Domain: Eukaryota
- Kingdom: Animalia
- Phylum: Arthropoda
- Class: Insecta
- Order: Lepidoptera
- Family: Crambidae
- Genus: Palpita
- Species: P. isoscelalis

Binomial name
- Palpita isoscelalis (Guenée, 1854)

Synonyms
- Margarodes isoscelalis Guenée, 1854

Species of insect

Palpita isoscelalis is a moth in the family Crambidae. It was described by Achille Guenée in 1854. It is found in South America (including Brazil) and on the Antilles (including Guadeloupe, the Grenadines, Saint Martin, Puerto Rico, Cuba).

The wingspan is about 24 mm. Adults have translucent wings.

== Subspecies ==
- Palpita isoscelalis isoscelalis
- Palpita isoscelalis gourbeyrensis Munroe, 1959 (French West Indies: Guadeloupe)
