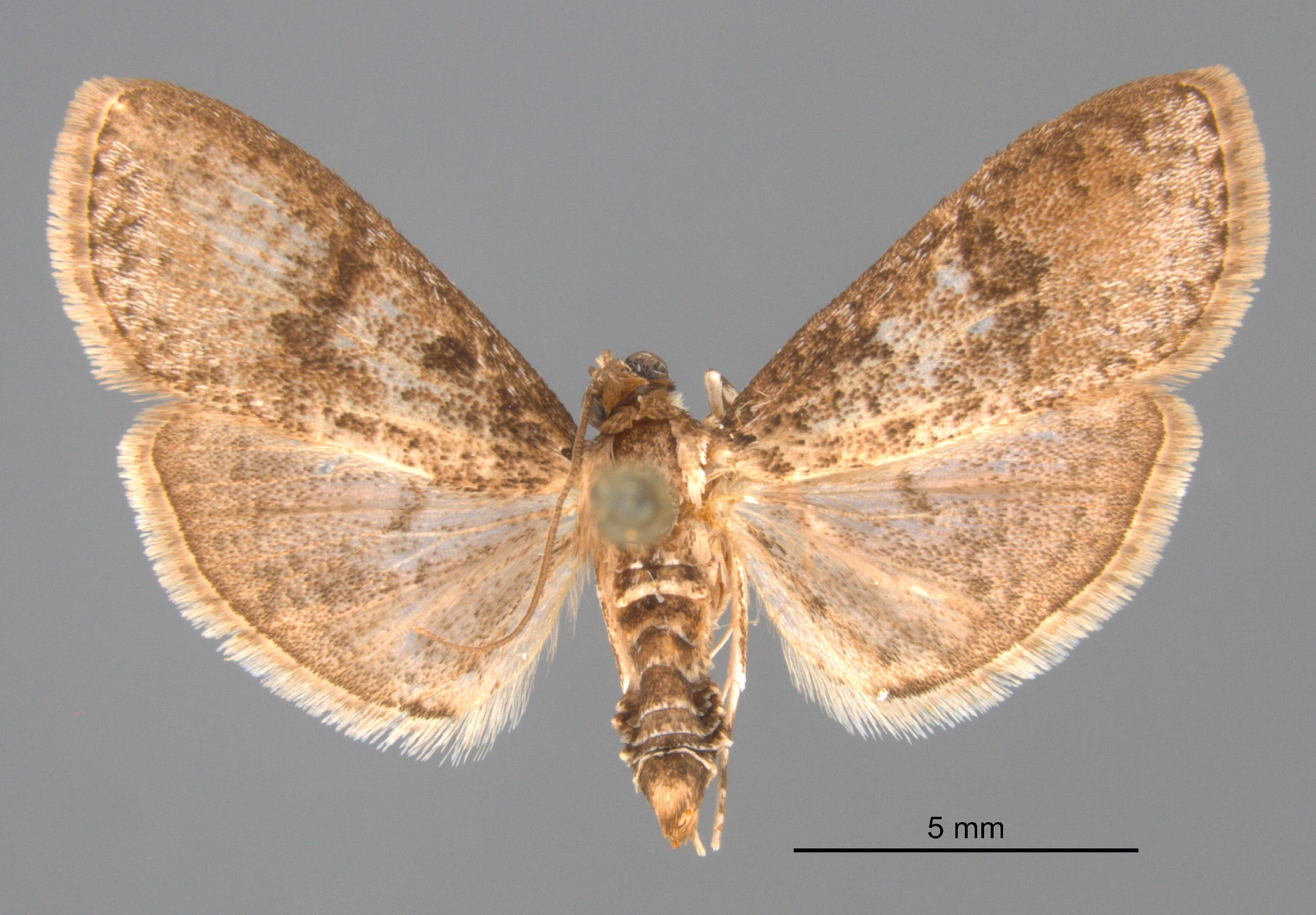

Scientific classification
- Domain: Eukaryota
- Kingdom: Animalia
- Phylum: Arthropoda
- Class: Insecta
- Order: Lepidoptera
- Family: Crambidae
- Genus: Palpita
- Species: P. cincinnatalis

Binomial name
- Palpita cincinnatalis Munroe, 1952

= Palpita cincinnatalis =

Species of moth

Palpita cincinnatalis is a moth in the family Crambidae. It was described by Eugene G. Munroe in 1952. It is found in North America, where it has been recorded from Florida, Illinois and Ohio.

The wingspan is about 20 mm. Adults have been recorded on wing from February to August.
