= Palpita hyaloptila =

Scientific classification
- Domain: Eukaryota
- Kingdom: Animalia
- Phylum: Arthropoda
- Class: Insecta
- Order: Lepidoptera
- Family: Crambidae
- Genus: Palpita
- Species: P. hyaloptila

Binomial name
- Palpita hyaloptila (Turner, 1915)

Synonyms
- Margaronia hyaloptila Turner, 1915

Species of moth

Palpita hyaloptila is a moth in the family Crambidae. It was described by Turner in 1915. It is found in Australia, where it has been recorded from Queensland.

Adults have translucent wings with brown spots.
