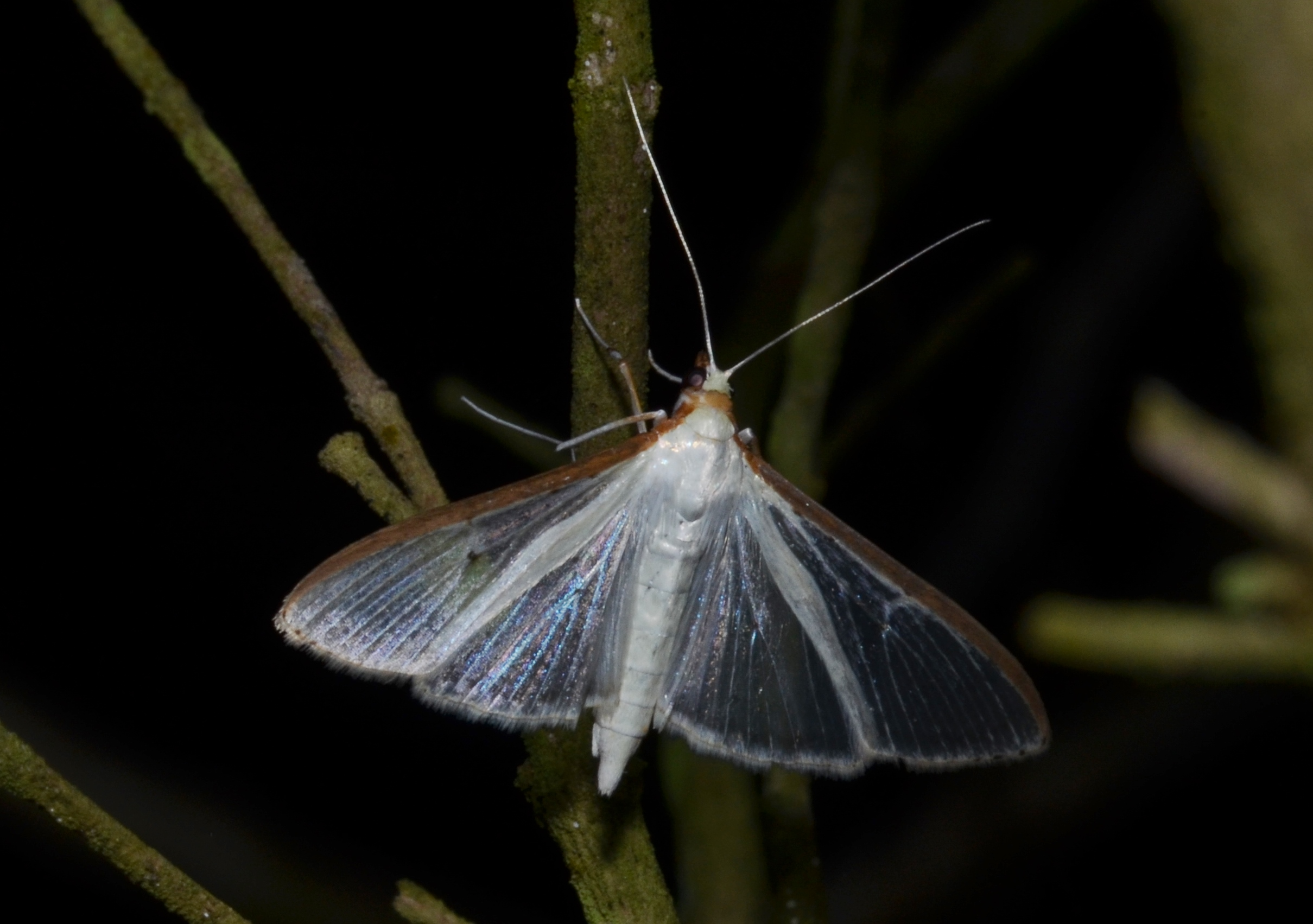

Scientific classification
- Domain: Eukaryota
- Kingdom: Animalia
- Phylum: Arthropoda
- Class: Insecta
- Order: Lepidoptera
- Family: Crambidae
- Genus: Palpita
- Species: P. quadristigmalis

Binomial name
- Palpita quadristigmalis (Guenée, 1854)

Synonyms
- Margarodes quadristigmalis Guenée, 1854

= Palpita quadristigmalis =

Species of moth

Palpita quadristigmalis, the four-spotted palpita moth, is a moth in the family Crambidae. It is found in North America, where it has been recorded from Quebec and Ontario to Florida, west to Arizona and north to Colorado.

The length of the forewings is 13.5-14.5 mm.

The larvae feed on Ligustrum species.

The larvae have also been found feeding on Olea europaea (olive) in Texas. They are recognized as a potential pest, as they are able to defoliate entire orchards and will also feed on the olive fruit.
