= Palpita conistolalis =

Scientific classification
- Kingdom: Animalia
- Phylum: Arthropoda
- Class: Insecta
- Order: Lepidoptera
- Family: Crambidae
- Genus: Palpita
- Species: P. conistolalis

Binomial name
- Palpita conistolalis (Hampson, 1918)

Synonyms
- Hapalia conistolalis Hampson, 1918

Species of moth

Palpita conistolalis is a moth in the family Crambidae. It was described by George Hampson in 1918. It is found in Nigeria.
