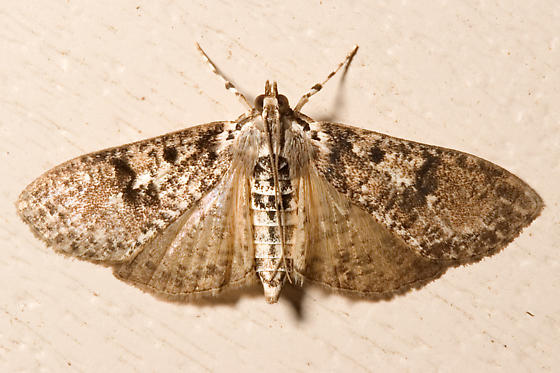

Scientific classification
- Kingdom: Animalia
- Phylum: Arthropoda
- Class: Insecta
- Order: Lepidoptera
- Family: Crambidae
- Genus: Palpita
- Species: P. arsaltealis

Binomial name
- Palpita arsaltealis (Walker, 1859)

Synonyms
- Botys arsaltealis Walker, 1859

= Palpita arsaltealis =

Species of moth

Palpita arsaltealis is a moth of the family Crambidae first described by Francis Walker in 1859. It is found in the north-eastern United States, south to South Carolina. It is also present in Quebec and Ontario.

The wingspan is about 16 mm. Adults are on wing from spring to late summer.
