= Palpita bakerialis =

Scientific classification
- Domain: Eukaryota
- Kingdom: Animalia
- Phylum: Arthropoda
- Class: Insecta
- Order: Lepidoptera
- Family: Crambidae
- Genus: Palpita
- Species: P. bakerialis

Binomial name
- Palpita bakerialis (Schaus, 1927)

Synonyms
- Margaronia bakerialis Schaus, 1927

Species of moth

Palpita bakerialis is a moth in the family Crambidae. It was described by Schaus in 1927. It is found in the Philippines (Luzon).
