= Palpita kimballi =

Scientific classification
- Domain: Eukaryota
- Kingdom: Animalia
- Phylum: Arthropoda
- Class: Insecta
- Order: Lepidoptera
- Family: Crambidae
- Genus: Palpita
- Species: P. kimballi

Binomial name
- Palpita kimballi Munroe, 1959

Species of moth

Palpita kimballi, or Kimball's palpita moth, is a moth in the family Crambidae. It was described by Eugene G. Munroe in 1959. It is found in North America, where it has been recorded from Alabama, Florida, Georgia, Louisiana, North Carolina, Oklahoma, South Carolina, Tennessee and Virginia.

The length of the forewings is 14–15 mm. Adults are mainly on wing from July to October.

== Etymology ==
The species is named for Charles P. Kimball, the author of The Lepidoptera of Florida: An Annotated Checklist.
