= Palpita curvispina =

Scientific classification
- Kingdom: Animalia
- Phylum: Arthropoda
- Class: Insecta
- Order: Lepidoptera
- Family: Crambidae
- Genus: Palpita
- Species: P. curvispina

Binomial name
- Palpita curvispina Zhang & Li, 2005

Species of moth

Palpita curvispina is a moth in the family Crambidae. It was described by Zhang and Li in 2005. It is found in China (Sichuan, Guizhou).

The wingspan is 24–26 mm.
