= Palpita vitiensis =

Scientific classification
- Domain: Eukaryota
- Kingdom: Animalia
- Phylum: Arthropoda
- Class: Insecta
- Order: Lepidoptera
- Family: Crambidae
- Genus: Palpita
- Species: P. vitiensis

Binomial name
- Palpita vitiensis Clayton, 2008

Species of moth

Palpita vitiensis is a moth in the family Crambidae. It was described by John Clayton in 2008 and is found on Fiji.
