= Palpita horocrates =

Scientific classification
- Kingdom: Animalia
- Phylum: Arthropoda
- Class: Insecta
- Order: Lepidoptera
- Family: Crambidae
- Genus: Palpita
- Species: P. horocrates

Binomial name
- Palpita horocrates (Meyrick, 1937)

Synonyms
- Margaronia horocrates Meyrick, 1937

Species of moth

Palpita horocrates is a moth in the family Crambidae. It is found in the Democratic Republic of Congo (West Kasai).
