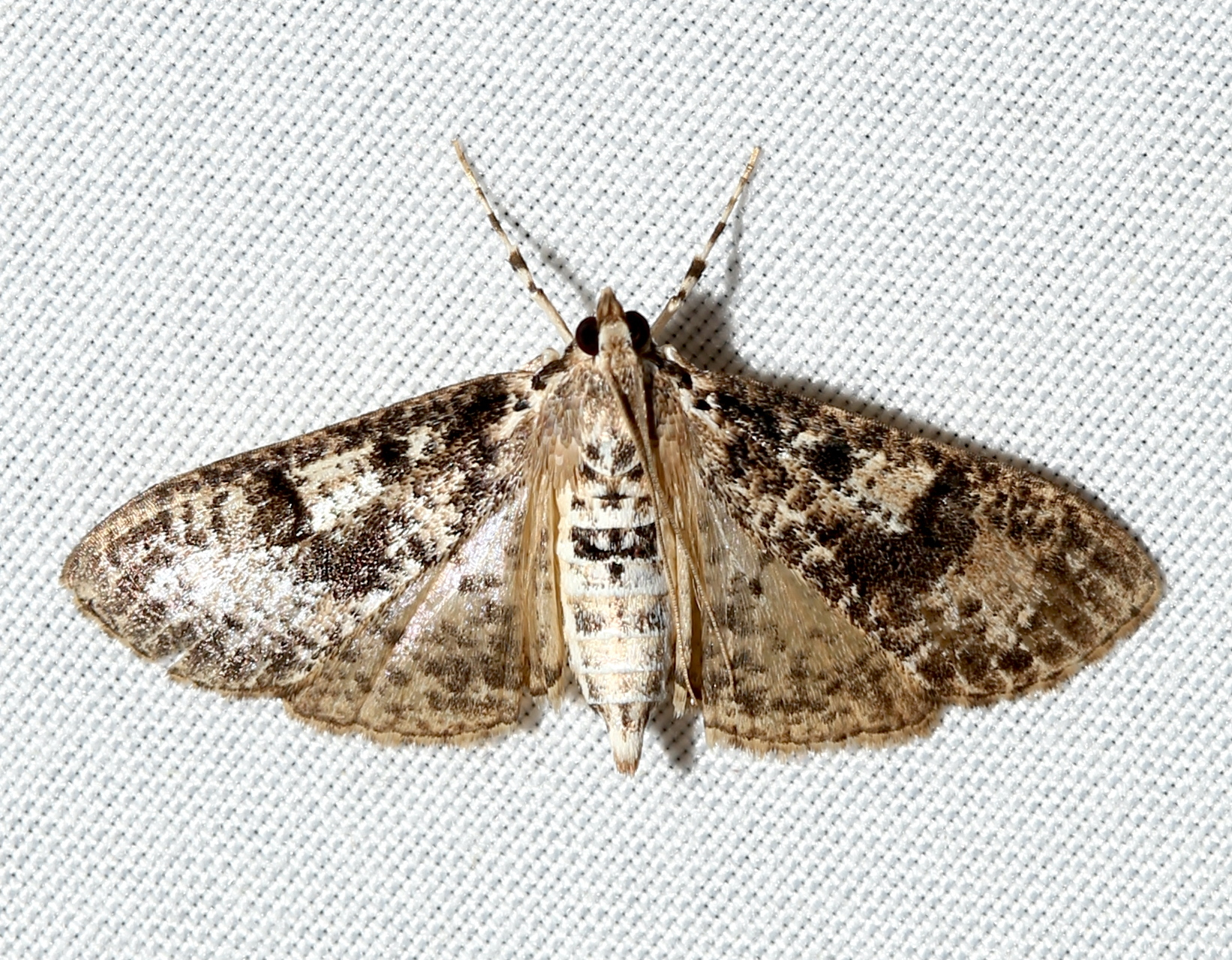

Scientific classification
- Kingdom: Animalia
- Phylum: Arthropoda
- Class: Insecta
- Order: Lepidoptera
- Family: Crambidae
- Genus: Palpita
- Species: P. magniferalis

Binomial name
- Palpita magniferalis (Walker, 1861)

Synonyms
- Botys magniferalis Walker, 1861; Scoparia fascialis Walker, 1862; Palpita fascialis (Walker, 1862); Sebunta guttulosa Walker, 1863; Palpita guttulosa (Walker, 1863)

= Palpita magniferalis =

Species of moth

Palpita magniferalis, the splendid palpita snout moth, ash pyralid or ash leafroller, is a moth of the family Crambidae. It is found in eastern North America.

The wingspan is 23–27 mm. Adults are on wing from April to October.

The larvae feed on Fraxinus species.

== Taxonomy ==
Palpita guttulosa is treated as a valid species by some authors.
