= Palpita limbata =

Scientific classification
- Domain: Eukaryota
- Kingdom: Animalia
- Phylum: Arthropoda
- Class: Insecta
- Order: Lepidoptera
- Family: Crambidae
- Genus: Palpita
- Species: P. limbata

Binomial name
- Palpita limbata (Butler, 1886)

Synonyms
- Margaronia limbata Butler, 1886; Botys albidalis Whalley, 1962

Species of moth

Palpita limbata is a moth in the family Crambidae. It is found on Rennell Island and Guadalcanal, as well as in Australia, where it has been recorded from Queensland and New South Wales.

The forewings are translucent white with a small spot and a brown costa. The wing margins have a narrow interrupted dark brown edge.
