= Palpita citrina =

Scientific classification
- Domain: Eukaryota
- Kingdom: Animalia
- Phylum: Arthropoda
- Class: Insecta
- Order: Lepidoptera
- Family: Crambidae
- Genus: Palpita
- Species: P. citrina

Binomial name
- Palpita citrina (H. Druce, 1902)

Synonyms
- Pilocrocis citrina H. Druce, 1902

Species of moth

Palpita citrina is a moth in the family Crambidae. It was described by Herbert Druce in 1902. It is found in Ecuador and Costa Rica.
