= Palpita cirrhopis =

Scientific classification
- Kingdom: Animalia
- Phylum: Arthropoda
- Class: Insecta
- Order: Lepidoptera
- Family: Crambidae
- Genus: Palpita
- Species: P. cirrhopis

Binomial name
- Palpita cirrhopis (Meyrick, 1937)

Synonyms
- Oeobia cirrhopis Meyrick, 1937

Species of moth

Palpita cirrhopis is a moth in the family Crambidae. It is found in the Democratic Republic of Congo (Katanga, West Kasai).
