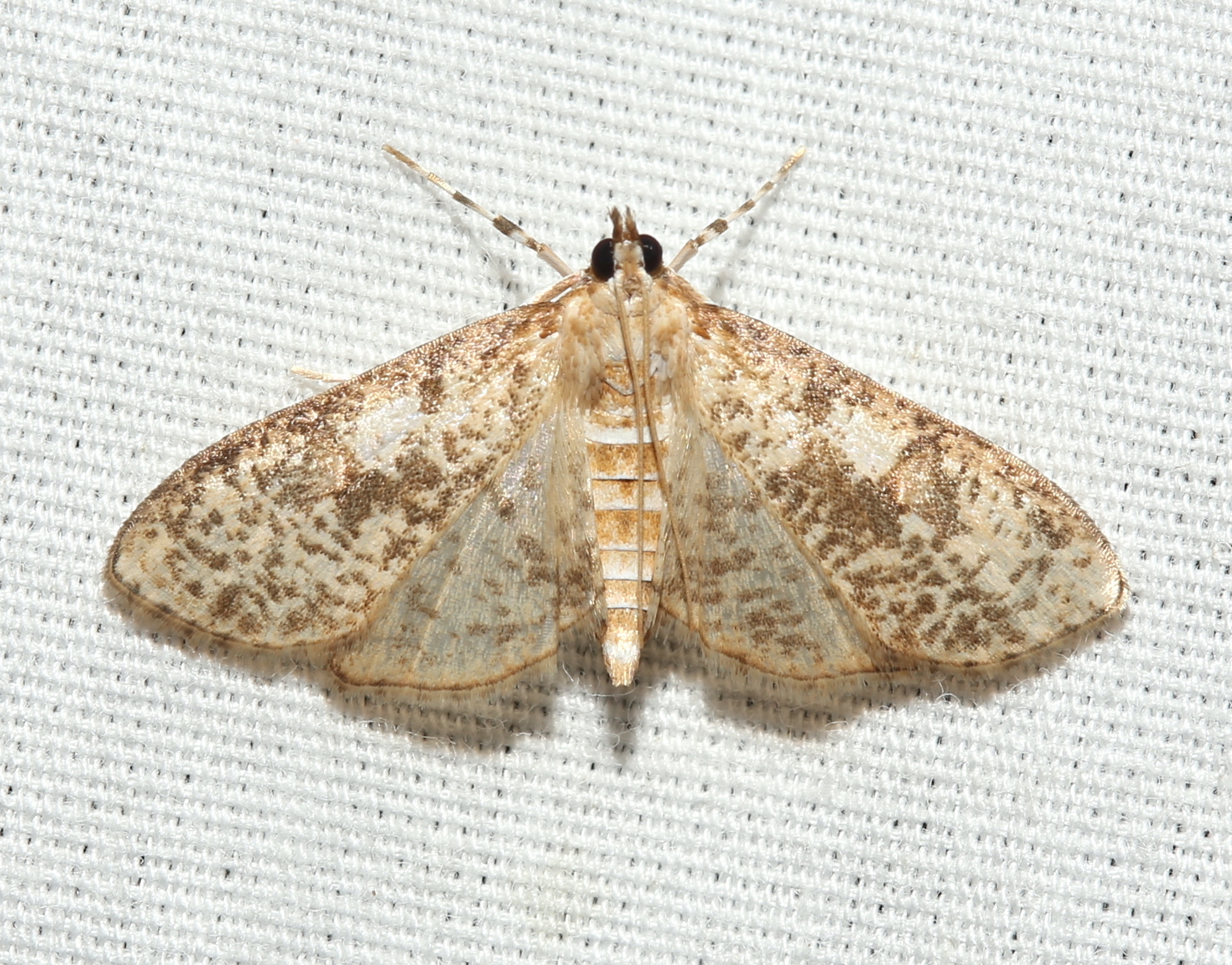

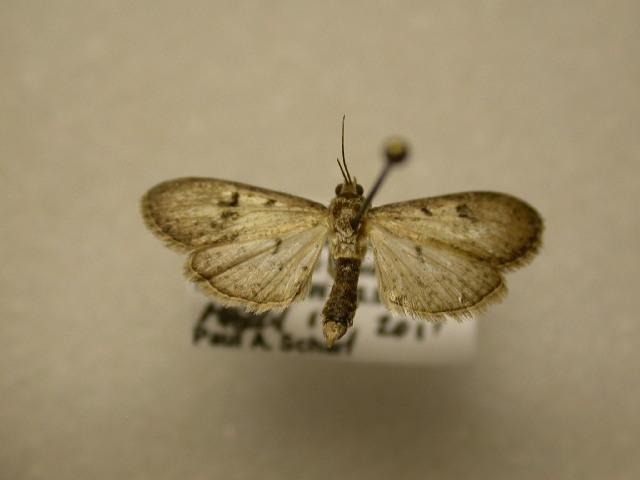

Scientific classification
- Kingdom: Animalia
- Phylum: Arthropoda
- Class: Insecta
- Order: Lepidoptera
- Family: Crambidae
- Genus: Palpita
- Species: P. freemanalis

Binomial name
- Palpita freemanalis Munroe, 1952

= Palpita freemanalis =

Species of moth

Palpita freemanalis, or Freeman's palpita moth, is a moth in the family Crambidae. It was described by Eugene G. Munroe in 1952. It is found in North America, where it has been recorded from Alabama, Illinois, Indiana, Louisiana, Maryland, Mississippi, North Carolina, Oklahoma, South Carolina, Tennessee and Texas.

The wingspan is 20–22 mm. Adults have been recorded from March to September, with most records from August.
