= Palpita braziliensis =

Scientific classification
- Domain: Eukaryota
- Kingdom: Animalia
- Phylum: Arthropoda
- Class: Insecta
- Order: Lepidoptera
- Family: Crambidae
- Genus: Palpita
- Species: P. braziliensis

Binomial name
- Palpita braziliensis Munroe, 1959

Species of moth

Palpita braziliensis is a moth in the family Crambidae. It was described by Eugene G. Munroe in 1959. It is found in Santa Catarina, Brazil.
