= Palpita argoleuca =

Scientific classification
- Kingdom: Animalia
- Phylum: Arthropoda
- Class: Insecta
- Order: Lepidoptera
- Family: Crambidae
- Genus: Palpita
- Species: P. argoleuca

Binomial name
- Palpita argoleuca (Meyrick, 1938)

Synonyms
- Margaronia argoleuca Meyrick, 1938

Species of moth

Palpita argoleuca is a moth in the family Crambidae. It was described by Edward Meyrick in 1938. It is found on Java in Indonesia.
