= Palpita picticostalis =

Scientific classification
- Kingdom: Animalia
- Phylum: Arthropoda
- Class: Insecta
- Order: Lepidoptera
- Family: Crambidae
- Genus: Palpita
- Species: P. picticostalis

Binomial name
- Palpita picticostalis (Hampson, 1896)

Synonyms
- Glyphodes picticostalis Hampson, 1896

Species of moth

Palpita picticostalis is a moth in the family Crambidae. It was described by George Hampson in 1896. It is found in Myanmar and on the Andaman Islands, as well as in Cambodia.
