= Palpita punctalis =

Scientific classification
- Domain: Eukaryota
- Kingdom: Animalia
- Phylum: Arthropoda
- Class: Insecta
- Order: Lepidoptera
- Family: Crambidae
- Genus: Palpita
- Species: P. punctalis

Binomial name
- Palpita punctalis (Warren, 1896)

Synonyms
- Pachyarches punctalis Warren, 1896

Species of moth

Palpita punctalis is a moth in the family Crambidae. It is found in Jamaica.
