= Hiroshi Inoue (entomologist) =

Japanese entomologist (1917–2008)

Hiroshi Inoue (井上寛, Inoue Hiroshi; 8 July 1917 – 2 June 2008) was a Japanese lepidopterist. He studied a wide range of moths, in particular the families Zygaenidae, Geometridae, and Pyralidae. During his career Inoue authored 1042 taxa.
