= Species first discovered in Hong Kong =

This list contains species first discovered in Hong Kong, with the endemic species asterisked.

== Plants ==
=== Asparagales ===
- Bulbophyllum bicolor* Lindl. - Two-coloured bulbophyllum
- Iris speculatrix Hance - Hong Kong iris
- Cheirostylis monteiroi* S.Y.Hu & Barretto - Monteiro's caterpillar orchid

=== Austrobaileyales ===
- Illicium angustisepalum* A.C.Sm. - Lantau star-anise

=== Cornales ===
- Cornus hongkongensis Hemsl. - Hong Kong dogwood

=== Ericales ===
- Camellia crapnelliana Tutcher - Crapnell's camellia
- Camellia granthamiana Sealy - Grantham's camellia
- Camellia hongkongensis Seem. - Hong Kong camellia
- Impatiens hongkongensis Grey-Wilson - Hong Kong balsam

=== Fabales ===
- Bauhinia × blakeana Dunn

=== Gentianales ===
- Pavetta hongkongensis Bremek.

=== Malpighiales ===
- Croton hancei Benth. - Hong Kong croton

=== Piperales ===
- Asarum hongkongense* S.M.Hwang & Wong Sui - Hong Kong asarum

=== Poales ===
- Oligostachyum shiuyingianum (L.C.Chia & But) G.H.Ye & Z.P.Wang - Hong Kong bamboo
- Sasa subglabra* McClure - Subglabrous cane

=== Sapindales ===
- Acer tutcheri Duthie - Tutcher's maple
- Fortunella hindsii (Champ. ex Benth.) Swingle, syn. of Citrus japonica Thunb.

=== Zingiberales ===
- Zingiber integrilabrum Hance* - Entire lip ginger (probably extinct)

== Animals ==
=== Mammals ===
- Chinese white dolphin (Sousa chinensis chinensis)

=== Amphibians ===
- Romer's tree frog (Philautus romeri)*
- Hong Kong newt (Paramesotriton hongkongensis)
- Hong Kong cascade frog (Amolops hongkongensis)
- Short-legged horned toad (Xenophrys brachykolos )*
- Polypedates megacephalus
- Fejervarya multistriata
- Rana macrodactyla
- Microhyla pulchra (Hallowell), 1861

=== Reptile ===
- Hongkong blind skink (Dibamus bogadeki)*
- Lazell's blind snake (Typhlops lazelli)*
- Anderson's stream snake (Ophisthotropis andersonii)
- Eumeces quadrilineatus (Blyth), 1853
- Achalinus rufescens Boulenger, 1888
- Calamaria septentrionalis Boulenger, 1890
- Dendrelaphis hollonrakei Lazell, 2002
- Ahaetulla prasina medioxima (Lazzell, 2002)

=== Fish ===
- Aphyocpris lini
- Hong Kong paradisefish (Macropodus hongkongensis)
- Pseudogastromyzon myersi
- Parazacco spilurus (Gunther), 1868
- Pseudohemiculter dispar (Peters), 1880
- Oreonectes platycephalus Gunther, 1868
- Rhinogobius duospilus (Herre, 1935)
- Bathyphylax bombifrons Myers, 1934
- Figaro melanobranchus (Chan), 1965
- Sphyraena putnamiae Jordan & Schlegel, 1905
- Osteomugil strongylocephalus (Richardson), 1846
- Argyrosomus pawak Lin, 1940
- Nibea chui Trewavas, 1971
- Callionymus altipinnis Fricke, 1981
- Arnoglossus tenuis Gunther, 1880
- Plagiopsetta fasciatus (Fowler), 1933
- Brachirus swinhonis (Steindachner), 1867
- Cynoglossus lineolatus Steindachner, 1867
- Opistognathus hongkongiensis Chan, 1968
- Bathygobius hongkongensis Lam, 1986
- Paraploactis hongkongiensis (Chan, 1966)*
- Xyrichtys trivittatus Randall & Cornish, 2000
- Neopomacentrus bankieri (Richardson, 1846)

=== Mollusca ===
- Phyllodesmium opalescene
- Chloritis hungerfordiana rufopila
- Cryptosoma imperator
- Kaliella hongkongensis
- Macrochlamys discus
- Macrochlamys nitidissma
- Marcrocycloides crenulate
- Microcystina schmackerina
- Microcystina stenomphala
- Sinoenna splendens hongkongensis
- Tornatellira boeningi

=== Annelida ===
- Aglaophamus toloensis Ohwada, 1992

=== Malacostraca ===
==== Decapoda ====
  - Haberma tingkok Cannicci & Ng, 2017
  - Perisesarma maipoensis (Soh, 1978)*
  - Parasesarma maipoensis
  - Nanhaipotamon hongkongense (Shen, 1940)*
  - Chiromanthes sereni (Soh, 1978)*
  - Pseudopythina patshuni (Soh, 1978)*
  - Charybdis hongkongensis Shen, 1934
  - Crypotopotamon anacoluthon (Kemp, 1918)*
  - Somanniathelphusa zanklon Ng & Dudgeon, 1992*
  - Caridina trifasciata (Yam & Cai, 2003)*
  - Caridina serrata (Stimpson, 1860)
  - Caridina apodosis Cai & Ng, 1999*
  - Neocaridina serrata*
  - Metapenaeopsis toloensis Hall, 1962
  - Periclimenes toloensis Bruce, 1969
  - Panulirus stimpsoni Holthuis, 1963
  - Periclimenes hongkongensis Bruce, 1969

==== Tanaids ====
  - Pakistanapseudes toloensis (Bamber, 1997)

==== Isopoda ====
  - Allokepon sinensis (Danforth, 1972)
  - Anchiarthrus derelictus Markham, 1992
  - Apophrixus constrictus Markham, 1980B
  - Aporobopyrus enosteoidis (Markham, 1982)
  - Bopyrione longicapitata Markham, 1980
  - Bopyrione toloensis Markham, 1980
  - Dicropleon morator Markham, 1980
  - Hypocepon globosus Markham, 1992
  - Litobopyrus longicaudatus Markham, 1980B
  - Orbione penei Bonnier, 1900
  - Parabopyrella perplexa Markham, 1990B
  - Probopyria elliptica Markham, 1992
  - Probopyrus novempalensis Markham, 1980B
  - Progebiophilus sinicus Markham, 1980B
  - Pseudostegias dulcilacuum Markham, 1980B
  - Rhopalione sinensis Markham, 1990B
  - Stegophryxus minutus Markham, 1992
  - Tylokepon naxiae (Bonnier, 1900)
  - Colanthura daguilarensis Bamber, 2000
  - Dryadillo maculatus (Arcangeli, 1952B)
  - Exalloniscus rotundatus Taiti & Ferrara, 1986A
  - Burmoniscus ocellatus (Verhoeff, 1928D)
  - Dynoides daguilarensis Li 2000

=== Arachnida ===
==== Araneae ====
- Gnaphosidae
  - Hongkongia wuae
- Philodromidae
  - Thanatus hongkong Song, Zhu & Wu, 1997
- Lycosidae
  - Pardosa pacata Fox, 1937
- Hahniidae
  - Hahnia thortoni Brignoli, 1982*
- Amaurobiidae
  - Bifidocoelotes primus (Fox, 1937)*
- Oxyopidae
  - Oxyopes daksina Sherriffs, 1955
- Salticidae
  - Pseudamycus bicoronatus Simon, 1901*
  - Pseudamycus relucens Simon, 1901*
  - Pancorius hongkong Song & al., 1997*
  - Bianor hongkong Song, Xie, Zhu, Wu, 1997*
  - Langona hongkong Song, Xie, Zhu, Wu, 1997*
  - Habrocestum hongkongiensis Proszynski, 1992*
  - Icius hongkong Song, Xie, Zhu, Wu, 1997*
  - Nanthela hongkong (Song & Wu, 1997)
  - Portia orientalis Murphy & Murphy, 1983
  - Thiania inermis (Karsch, 1897)
- Corinnidae
  - Castianeira hongkong Song, Zhu & Wu, 1997
- Liphistiidae
  - Nanthela hongkong (Song and Wu, 1997)
- Thomisidae
  - Mastira tegularis Xu, Han & Li, 2008*
  - Massuria bellula Xu, Han & Li, 2008*
  - Diaea simplex Xu, Han & Li, 2008*
  - Lysiteles hongkong Song, Zhu & Wu, 1997
  - Ebrechtella hongkong (Song, Zhu & Wu, 1997)

===== Acari =====
- Copidognathus daguilarensis Bartsch, 1997
- Copidognathus gracilunguis Bartsch, 1992
- Copidognathus inconspicuus Bartsch, 1991
- Copidognathus longiunguis Bartsch, 1990
- Copidognathus monacanthus Bartsch, 1992
- Copidognathus neptuneus Bartsch, 1992
- Copidognathus occultans Bartsch, 1991
- Copidognathus paluster Bartsch, 1991
- Copidognathus polyporus Bartsch, 1991
- Copidognathus strictulus Bartsch, 1997
- Copidognathus umbonatus Bartsch, 1992
- Copidognathus vicinus Bartsch, 1997
- Rhombognathus arenarius Bartsch, 1992
- Rhombognathus dictyotus Bartsch, 1992
- Rhombognathus hirtellus Bartsch, 1992
- Rhombognathus luxtoni (Bartsch, 1992)
- Rhombognathus neptunellus Bartsch, 1992
- Rhombognathus obesus (Bartsch, 1992)
- Rhombognathus setellus Bartsch, 1992
- Rhombognathus sinensis Bartsch, 1990
- Rhombognathus sinensoideus Bartsch, 1992
- Rhombognathus verrucosus Bartsch, 1992
- Actacarus sinensis Bartsch, 1991
- Copidognathus acanthoscelus Bartsch, 1992
- Copidognathus cephalocanthus Bartsch, 1992
- Copidognathus cerberoideus Bartsch, 1991
- Copidognathus consobrinus Bartsch, 1991
- Copidognathus gracilunguis Bartsch, 1992
- Copidognathus daguilarensis Bartsch, 1997
- Copidognathus inconspicuus Bartsch, 1991
- Copidognathus longiunguis Bartsch, 1990
- Copidognathus monacanthus Bartsch, 1992
- Copidognathus neptuneus Bartsch, 1992
- Copidognathus occultans Bartsch, 1991
- Copidognathus paluster Bartsch, 1991
- Copidognathus polyporus Bartsch, 1991
- Copidognathus strictulus Bartsch, 1997
- Copidognathus umbonatus Bartsch, 1992
- Copidognathus vicinus Bartsch, 1997
- Arhodeoporus minusculus Bartsch, 1991
- Agauopsis ammodytes Bartsch, 1992
- Agauopsis arenaria Bartsch, 1992
- Agauopsis humilis Bartsch, 1992
- Agauopsis sordida Bartsch, 1992
- Scaptognathus triunguis Bartsch, 1991
- Simognathus foveolatus Bartsch, 1991
- Acarochelopodia lapidaria Bartsch, 1991
- Litarachna hongkongensis Smit, 2002

=== Insects ===
==== Lepidoptera ====
- Tineoidea
- Tineidae
  - Myrmecozelinae
    - Thisizima fasciaria Yang, Li & Kendrick, 2012
    - Thisizima subceratella Yang, Li & Kendrick, 2012
- Gracillarioidea
- Gracillariidae
  - Gracillariinae
    - Gibbovalva singularis Bai & Li, 2008
- Gelechioidea
- Oecophoridae
  - Oecophorinae
    - Promalactis quinilineata Wang, Kendrick & Sterling, 2009*
    - Promalactis similinfulata Wang, Kendrick & Sterling, 2009*
    - Promalactis noviloba Wang, Kendrick & Sterling, 2009*
    - Promalactis longiuncata Wang, Kendrick & Sterling, 2009*
    - Promalactis biovata Wang, Kendrick & Sterling, 2009*
    - Promalactis lobatifera Wang, Kendrick & Sterling, 2009*
    - Promalactis apicispinifera Wang, Kendrick & Sterling, 2009*
    - Stereodytis acutidens Wang & Kendrick, 2009*
    - Stereodytis brevignatha Wang & Kendrick, 2009*
- Stathmopodidae
    - Hieromantis arcuata Guan & Li, 2015
    - Stathmopoda tetracantha Wang, Wang & Guan, 2021*
- Xyloryctidae
  - Xyloryctinae
    - Neospastis sinensis Bradley, 1967*
- Cosmopterigidae
  - Scaeosophinae
    - Scaeosopha hongkongensis Li & Zhang, 2012*
- Gelechiidae
  - Dichomeridinae
    - Dichomeris argentenigera Li, Zhen & Kendrick, 2010
    - Dichomeris hamulifera Li, Zhen & Kendrick, 2010*
    - Dichomeris parvisexafurca Li, Zhen & Kendrick, 2010*
- Sesioidea
- Sesiidae
  - Sesiinae - Sesiini
    - Toleria sinensis (Walker, 1854)*
  - Sesiinae - Paranthrenini
    - Gaea variegata (Walker, 1854)*
- Zygaenoidea
- Epipyropidae
    - Fulgoraecia bowringii Newman, 1851
- Tortricoidea
- Tortricidae
  - Tortricinae - Cochylini
    - Gynnidomorpha pista (Diakonoff, 1984)*
      Original combination = Phalonidia pista Diakonoff, 1984
  - Chlidanotinae - Hilarographini
    - Hilarographa shehkonga Razowski, 2009*
  - Olethreutinae
    - Sorolopha archimedias (Meyrick, 1912)
      Original combination = Argyroploce archimedias Meyrick, 1912
- Pyraloidea
- Crambidae
  - Musotiminae
    - Siamusotima disrupta Solis, 2017*
  - Spilomelinae
    - Palpita minuscula Inoue, 1996*
    - Palpita parvifraterna Inoue, 1999*
- Geometroidea
- Geometridae
  - Ennominae
    - Microcalicha reelsi Sato & Galsworthy, 1998
    - Pseudothalera carolinae Galsworthy, 1997
    - Psilalcis galsworthyi Sato, 1996*
  - Larentiinae
    - Sauris purpurotincta Galsworthy, 1999
    - Sauris victoriae Galsworthy, 1999*
    - Axinoptera anticostalis Galsworthy, 1999
    - Eupithecia sekkongensis Galsworthy, 1999
      a junior synonym of E. mundiscripta (Warren, 1907)
    - Sigilliclystis kendricki Galsworthy, 1999*
    - Spiralisigna gloriae Galsworthy, 1999*
  - Geometrinae
    - Pingasa chloroides Galsworthy, 1997*
    - Maxates brevicaudata Galsworthy, 1997*
    - Thalassodes maipoensis Galsworthy, 1997*
    - Berta rugosivalva Galsworthy, 1997
    - Microloxia chlorissoides (Prout, 1912)
- Papilionoidea
- Hesperiidae
  - Hesperiinae
    - Halpe paupera walthewi Devyatkin, 2002*
- Bombycoidea
- Sphingidae
  - Macroglossinae - Macroglossini
    - Theretra suffusa (Walker, 1856)
- Noctuoidea
- Notodontidae
  - Notodontinae
    - Neodrymonia taipoensis Galsworthy, 1997
- Erebidae
  - Arctiinae - Lithosiini
    - Cyana harterti (Elwes, 1890)
  - Lymantriinae - Orgyiini
    - Aroa ochripicta Moore, 1879
      a junior synonym of A. substrigosa (Walker, 1855)
  - Lymantriinae - Nygmiini
    - Euproctis seitzi Strand, 1910
  - Hypenodinae - Hypenodini
    - Luceria striata Galsworthy, 1997*
    - Schrankia bilineata Galsworthy, 1997*
  - Hypenodinae - Micronoctuini - Belluliina
    - Bellulia galsworthyi Fibiger, 2008*
    - Fustius sterlingi Fibiger, 2010*
  - Hypeninae
    - Lysimelia lucida Galsworthy, 1997*
  - Pangraptinae
    - Pangrapta bicornuta Galsworthy, 1997*
    - Pangrapta roseinotata Galsworthy, 1997*
  - Boletobiinae - Aventiini
    - Cerynea discontenta Galsworthy, 1998*
    - Hyposada kadooriensis Galsworthy, 1998*
  - Erebiinae
    - Oglasa stygiana Galsworthy, 1997
    - Ugia purpurea Galsworthy, 1997
    - Ugia insuspecta Galsworthy, 1997
- Nolidae
  - Nolinae
    - Spininola kendricki László & Sterling, 2020*
    - Hampsonola ceciliae László & Sterling, 2020*
  - Eligminae
    - Baroa vatala Swinhoe, 1894
- Noctuidae
  - Dyopsinae
    - Belciana scorpio Galsworthy, 1997*
  - Bagisarinae
    - Chasmina sinuata Galsworthy, 1997*
  - Noctuinae - Caradrinini - Athetiina
    - Athetis hongkongensis Galsworthy, 1997*
    - Athetis bispurca Galsworthy, 1997*
  - Noctuinae - Orthosiini
    - Egira ambigua Galsworthy, 1997*

==== Odonata ====
- Cordullidae
  - Macromidia katae Wilson, 1993
  - Macromidia ellanae Wilson, 1996*
- Gomphidae
  - Leptogomphus elegans hongkongensis Asahina, 1988*
  - Fukienogomphus choifongae Wilson & Tam, 2006*
  - Melligomphus molluami Wilson, 1995
- Megapodagrionidae
  - Rhipidolestes janetae Wilson, 1977*
- Platystictidae
  - Drepanosticta hongkongensis Wilson, 1977
  - Protosticta beaumonti Wilson, 1997
  - Protosticta taipokauensis Asahina & Dudgeon, 1987
  - Stylogomphus chunliuae Chao, 1954

==== Ephemeroptera ====
- Baetidae
  - Alainites acutulus Tong & Dudgeon, 2000
  - Alainites lingulatus Tong & Dudgeon, 2000
  - Chorpralla fusina Tong & Dudgeon, 2000
  - Caenis bicornis Tong & Dudgeon, 2000
  - Caenis lubrica Tong & Dudgeon, 2000
- Ephemerellidae
  - Serratella albostriata Tong & Dudgeon, 2000
  - Torleya arenosa Tong & Dudgeon, 2000
- Heptageniidae
  - Compsoneuria taipokauensis Tong & Dudgeon, 2000
  - Epeorus sagittatus Tong & Dudgeon, 2000
  - Heptagenia ngi Hsu, 1936
- Leptophlebiidae
  - Choroterpes petersi Tong & Dudgeon, 2000
- Prosopistomatidae
  - Prosopistoma sinensis Tong & Dudgeon, 2000

==== Phasmatodea ====
- Phasmatidae
  - Ramulus caii (Brock & Seow-Choen 2000)
  - Entoria victoria Brock & Seow-Choen, 2000*
- Heteronemiidae
  - Phraortes stomphax (Westwood 1859)*
  - Sipyloidea shukayi Bi, Zhang & Lau, 2001*
  - Neohirasea hongkongensis Brock & Seow-Choen, 2000*
  - Macellina souchongia (Westwood, 1859)

==== Megaloptera ====
- Corydalidae
  - Neochauliodes bowringi (McLachlan, 1867)

==== Coleoptera ====
- Coccinellidae
  - Coccidulinae
    - Rodolia pumila Weise, 1892
  - Scymninae
    - Horniolus hisamatsui Miyatake, 1976*
    - Diomus lantauensis Yu & Lau, 2001*
    - Nephus eurypodus Yu & Lau, 2001
    - Scymnus alocasia Yu & Lau, 2001*
  - Coccinellinae
    - Lemnia circumusta (Mulsant, 1850)
    - Illeis confusa Timberlake, 1943
- Eulichadidae
  - Eulichas dudgeoni Jach in Jach & Li, 1995
- Scarabaeidae
  - Onthophagus convexicollis Boheman, 1858
  - Onthophagus proletarius Harold, 1875
  - Onthophagus luridipennis Boheman, 1858
  - Onthophagus taurinus White, 1844
  - Onthophagus lunatus Harold, 1868
  - Onthophagus orientalis Harold, 1868
  - Sisyphus bowringi White, 1841
- Staphylinidae
  - Atheta hongongiphila
  - Atheta hoihaensis
  - Atheta samchunensis
  - Pedinopleurus hongkongicola
  - Zyras falsus Hlaváč, 2005*
  - Zyras lacunarumbeneolentium Pace, 1993*
- Leiodidae
  - Agathidium xianggangense Angelini & Cooter, 1999*
  - Agathidium bowringi Angelini & Cooter, 1999*
- Chrysomelidae
  - Downesia tarsata Baly, 1869
  - Dactylispa pungens (Boheman), 1859
  - Callispa bowringi Baly, 1858
  - Chiridopsis bowringii (Boheman, 1885)
  - Oides bowringii (Baly, 1863)
- Cerambycidae
  - Pterolophia hongkongensis Gressitt, 1942
  - Sciades hongkongensis Breuning, 1968

==== Hymenoptera ====
- Chalcidoidea
- Aphelinidae
  - Aphelininae
    - Aphelinus hongkongensis Hayat, 1994
- Encyrtidae
  - Encrytinae
    - Leurocerus hongkongensis Subba Rao, 1971
- Ormyridae
  - Ormyrinae
    - Ormyrus hongkongensis Narendran, 1999
- Chrysidoidea
- Bethylidae
  - Mesitiinae
    - Metrionotus hongkongensis Moczar, 1974
  - Pristocerinae
    - Pseudisobrachium hongkongense Terayama, 1996
- Dyrinidae
  - Dryininae
    - Dryinus bellicus Olmi, 1987
  - Gonatopodinae
    - Neodryinus dolosus Olmi, 1984*
- Apoidea
- Crabronidae
  - Larrinae
    - Trypoxylon takasago hongkongense Tsuneki, 1981
- Vespoidea
- Formicidae
  - Formicinae
    - Camponotus maculatus hongkongensis
      subspecies name not listed on Hymenoptera Name Server v1.5
    - Camponotus irritans hongkongensis Forel, 1912
  - Myrmicinae
    - Pheidole hongkongensis Wheeler, 1928
- Vespidae
  - Polistinae
    - Ropalidia hongkongensis (Saussure, 1854)
  - Eumeninae
    - Parancistrocerus hongkongensis Gusenleitner, 2002

==== Isoptera ====
- Rhinotermitidae
  - Coptotermes hongkongensis Oshima, 1914
  - Coptotermes melanoistriatus Lau & He, 1995
- Termitidae
  - Ahmaditermes choui Ping & Tong, 1989
  - Macrotermes planicapitatus Gao & Lau, 1996
  - Nasutitermes choui Ping & Xu, 1989
  - Nasutitermes dudgeoni Gao & Lam, 1986

==== Psocoptera ====
- Epipsocidae
  - Hinduipsocus hongkongensis Li & Mockford, 1997
- Mesopsocidae
  - Mesopsocus hongkongensis Thornton, 1959
- Peripsocidae
  - Peripsocus hongkongensis Thornton & Wong, 1968

==== Diptera ====
- Ceratopogonidae
  - Forcipomyia nanshengwei
  - Forcipomyia yuani
  - Forcipomyia fengjiensis
  - Forcipomyiia claris
  - Bezzia datana
  - Bezzia lujingi
  - Leptoconops hongkongensis
  - Dasyhelea abronica
- Culicidae
  - Uranotaenia jacksoni Edwards, 1935
  - Uranotaenia macfarlanei Edwards, 1914
  - Culex annulus Theobald, 1901
  - Culex infantulus Edwards, 1922
  - Culex jacksoni Edwards, 1934
  - Aedes macfarianei (Edwards), 1914
  - Ficalbia jacksoni Mattingly, 1949
  - Anopheles minimus Theobald, 1901
  - Anopheles maculatus Theobald, 1901
- Tachinidae
  - Peribaea hongkongensis Tachi & Shima, 2002

==== Hemiptera ====
- Aleyrodidae
  - Paraleyrodes pseudonaranjae Martin, 2001
- Aphididae
  - Aulacophoroides millettiae Qiao, Jiang & Martin, 2006
  - Toxoptera victroiae Martin, 1991
- Coccidae
  - Cribropulvinaria tailungensis Hodgson & Martin, 2001
  - Fistulococcus pokfulamensis Hodgson & Martin, 2005
- Miridae
  - Orientomiris sinicus (Walker), 1873

==== Trichoptera ====
- Helicopsychidae
  - Helicopsyche agnetae Johanson & Oláh, 2008

== See also ==
- Environment of Hong Kong
