= B. nepalensis =

B. nepalensis may refer to:

- Bellulia nepalensis, a Nepalese moth
- Berberis napaulensis, a shrub with edible berries
- Boreoheptagyia nepalensis, a non-biting midge
- Bradycellus nepalensis, a ground beetle
