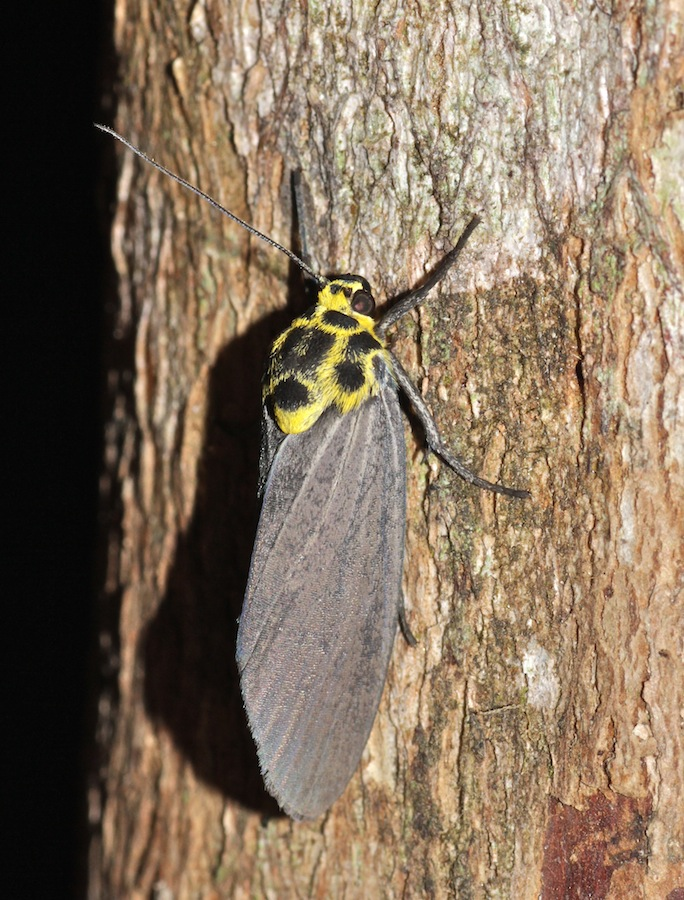
- Borneo, Trusmadi hill dipterocarp forest

Scientific classification
- Kingdom: Animalia
- Phylum: Arthropoda
- Class: Insecta
- Order: Lepidoptera
- Superfamily: Noctuoidea
- Family: Erebidae
- Subfamily: Arctiinae
- Genus: Baroa
- Species: B. siamica

Binomial name
- Baroa siamica Hampson, 1911

Synonyms
- Baroa javanica Rothschild, 1935; Baroa soricina javanica Kalis, 1934

= Baroa siamica =

Species of moth

Baroa siamica is a noctuoid moth in the family Erebidae, subfamily Arctiinae. It is found in Thailand, Sundaland and Luzon in the Philippines. The habitat consists of lower and upper montane forests and lowland dipterocarp forests.

Adults have dark brownish grey forewings and blackish hindwings. Adults have been recorded on wing in June, from September to October and in November.

== Subspecies ==
- Baroa siamica siamica (Thailand, Sundaland, Philippines)
- Baroa siamica javanica Kalis, 1934 (Java)
- Baroa siamica maramaga Černý, 2010 (Philippines: Mindanao)
