= Fustius extuta =

Scientific classification
- Domain: Eukaryota
- Kingdom: Animalia
- Phylum: Arthropoda
- Class: Insecta
- Order: Lepidoptera
- Superfamily: Noctuoidea
- Family: Erebidae
- Genus: Fustius
- Species: F. extuta

Binomial name
- Fustius extuta (Fibiger, 2010)

Synonyms
- Fustis extuta Fibiger, 2010

Species of moth

Fustius extuta is a moth of the family Erebidae first described by Michael Fibiger in 2010. It is known from northern Thailand.

The wingspan is about 11 mm.
