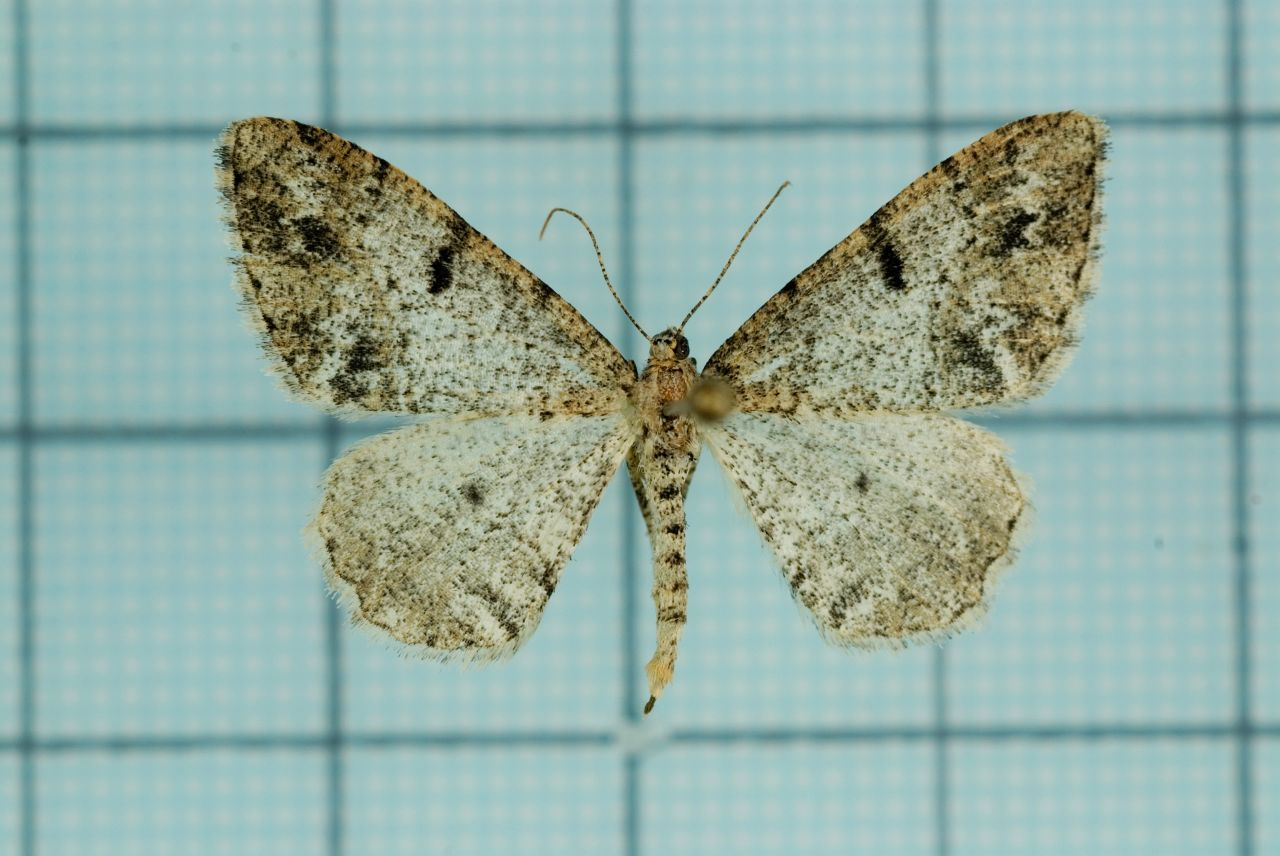

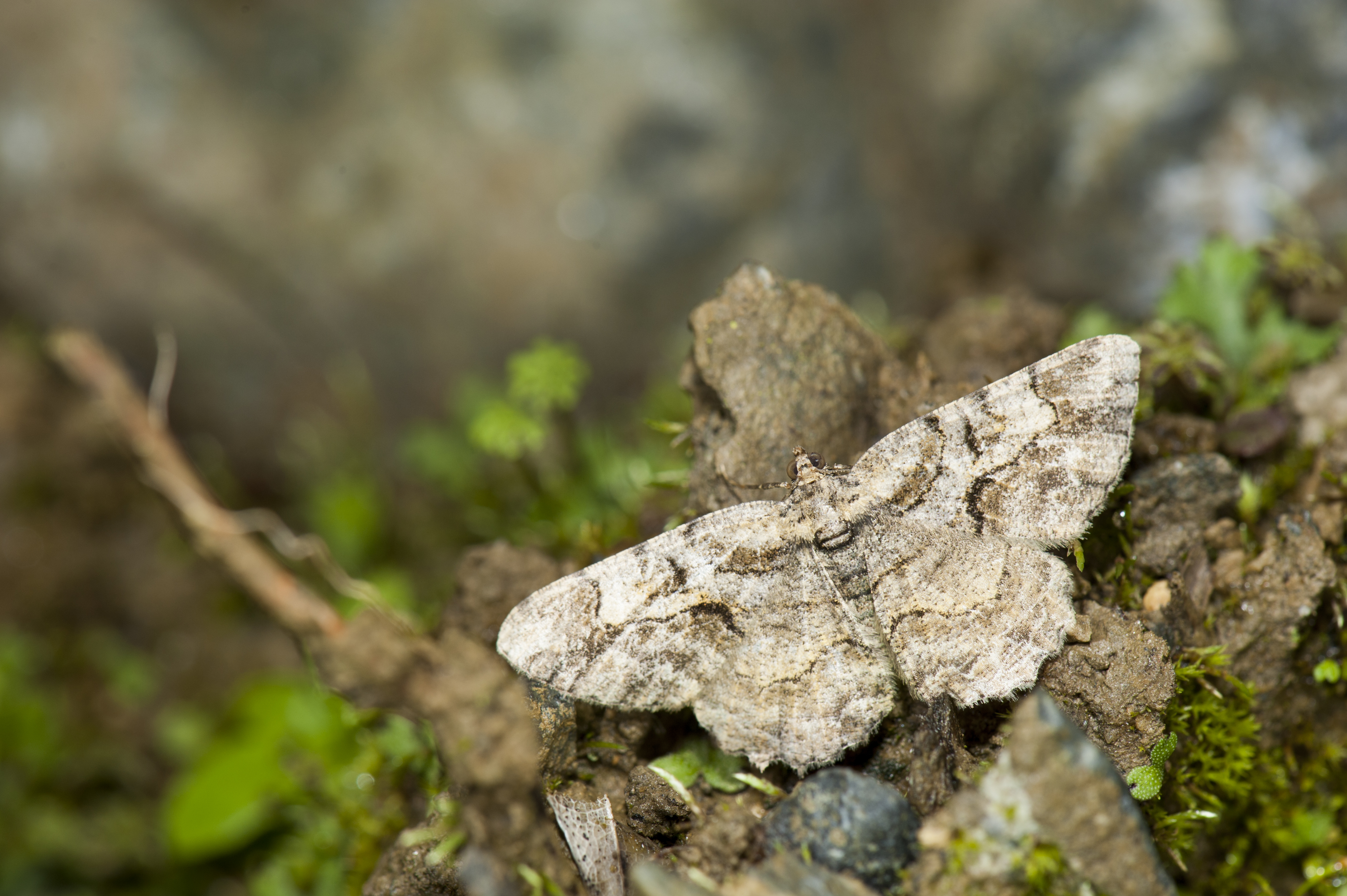

Scientific classification
- Domain: Eukaryota
- Kingdom: Animalia
- Phylum: Arthropoda
- Class: Insecta
- Order: Lepidoptera
- Family: Geometridae
- Genus: Psilalcis
- Species: P. pulveraria

Binomial name
- Psilalcis pulveraria (Wileman, 1912)

Synonyms
- Ectropis pulveraria Wileman, 1912; Lomographa pulveraria; Paralcis pulveraria; Ectropis nigriflexa Prout, 1914

= Psilalcis pulveraria =

Species of moth

Psilalcis pulveraria is a moth in the family Geometridae. It is found in Taiwan.

The wingspan is 29–33 mm.
