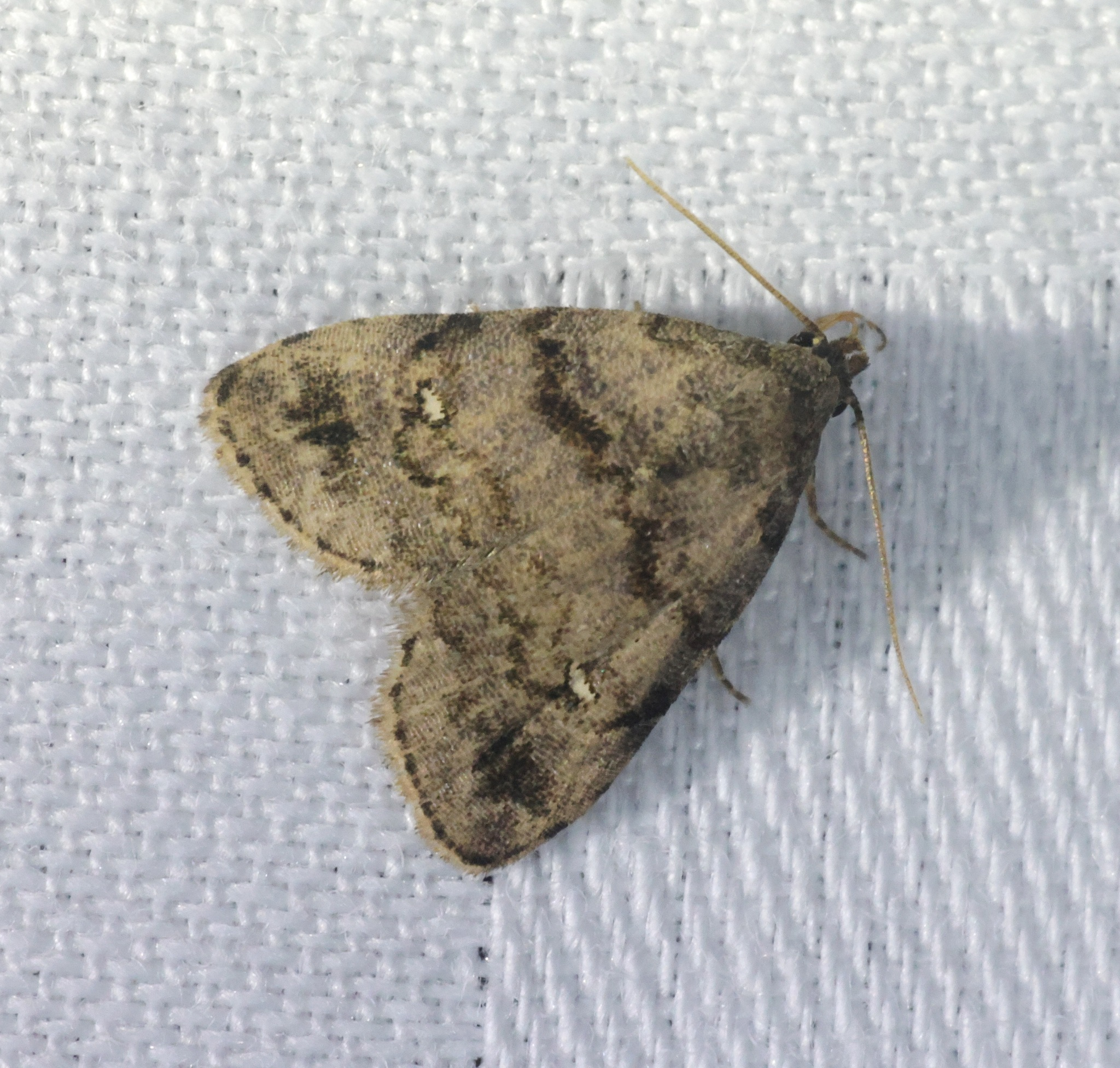
- Bellulia galsworthyi

Scientific classification
- Kingdom: Animalia
- Phylum: Arthropoda
- Clade: Pancrustacea
- Class: Insecta
- Order: Lepidoptera
- Superfamily: Noctuoidea
- Family: Erebidae
- Subtribe: Belluliina
- Genus: Bellulia; Fibiger, 2008

= Bellulia =

Genus of moths

Bellulia is a genus of moths of the family Erebidae. The genus was erected by Michael Fibiger in 2008.

== Species ==
- The kareni species group
  - Bellulia kareni Fibiger, 2008
- The laosiensis species group
  - Bellulia laosiensis Fibiger, 2008
- The nilssoni species group
  - Bellulia nilssoni Fibiger, 2008
- The lacii species group
  - Bellulia lacii Fibiger, 2008
- The galsworthyi species group
  - Bellulia galsworthyi Fibiger, 2008
  - Bellulia kononenkoi Fibiger, 2008
- The bella species group
  - Bellulia mariannae Fibiger, 2008
  - Bellulia parabella Fibiger, 2008
  - Bellulia bella Fibiger, 2008
  - Bellulia hanae Fibiger, 2008
  - Bellulia bibella Fibiger, 2011
- The suffusa species group
  - Bellulia suffusa Fibiger, 2008
- The wui species group
  - Bellulia incognita Fibiger, 2008
  - Bellulia nepalensis Fibiger, 2008
  - Bellulia wui Fibiger, 2008
- The antemediana species group
  - Bellulia frateriana Fibiger, 2008
  - Bellulia antemediana Fibiger, 2008
- Unknown species group
  - Bellulia kendricki Fibiger, 2010
  - Bellulia basalia Fibiger, 2010
  - Bellulia postea Fibiger, 2010
