= Spiralisigna minutissima =

Scientific classification
- Domain: Eukaryota
- Kingdom: Animalia
- Phylum: Arthropoda
- Class: Insecta
- Order: Lepidoptera
- Family: Geometridae
- Genus: Spiralisigna
- Species: S. minutissima

Binomial name
- Spiralisigna minutissima (C. Swinhoe, 1902)

Synonyms
- Gymnoscelis minutissima C. Swinhoe, 1902

Species of moth

Spiralisigna minutissima is a moth in the family Geometridae first described by Charles Swinhoe in 1902. It is found on Sumbawa, Bali, Peninsular Malaysia, Borneo and the Philippines.

The larvae feed on Flacourtia species.
