= Siamusotima aranea =

Scientific classification
- Kingdom: Animalia
- Phylum: Arthropoda
- Clade: Pancrustacea
- Class: Insecta
- Order: Lepidoptera
- Family: Crambidae
- Genus: Siamusotima
- Species: S. aranea

Binomial name
- Siamusotima aranea Solis, Yen, Goolsby, Wright, Pemberton, Winotal, Chattrukul, Thagong & Rimbut, 2005

Species of moth

Siamusotima aranea is a species of moth of the family Crambidae first described by Maria Alma Solis et al. in 2005.
