= Fustius gregerseni =

Scientific classification
- Domain: Eukaryota
- Kingdom: Animalia
- Phylum: Arthropoda
- Class: Insecta
- Order: Lepidoptera
- Superfamily: Noctuoidea
- Family: Erebidae
- Genus: Fustius
- Species: F. gregerseni

Binomial name
- Fustius gregerseni (Fibiger, 2010)

Synonyms
- Fustis gregerseni Fibiger, 2010

Species of moth

Fustius gregerseni is a moth of the family Erebidae first described by Michael Fibiger in 2010. It is known from western Thailand.

The wingspan is about 14.5 mm.
