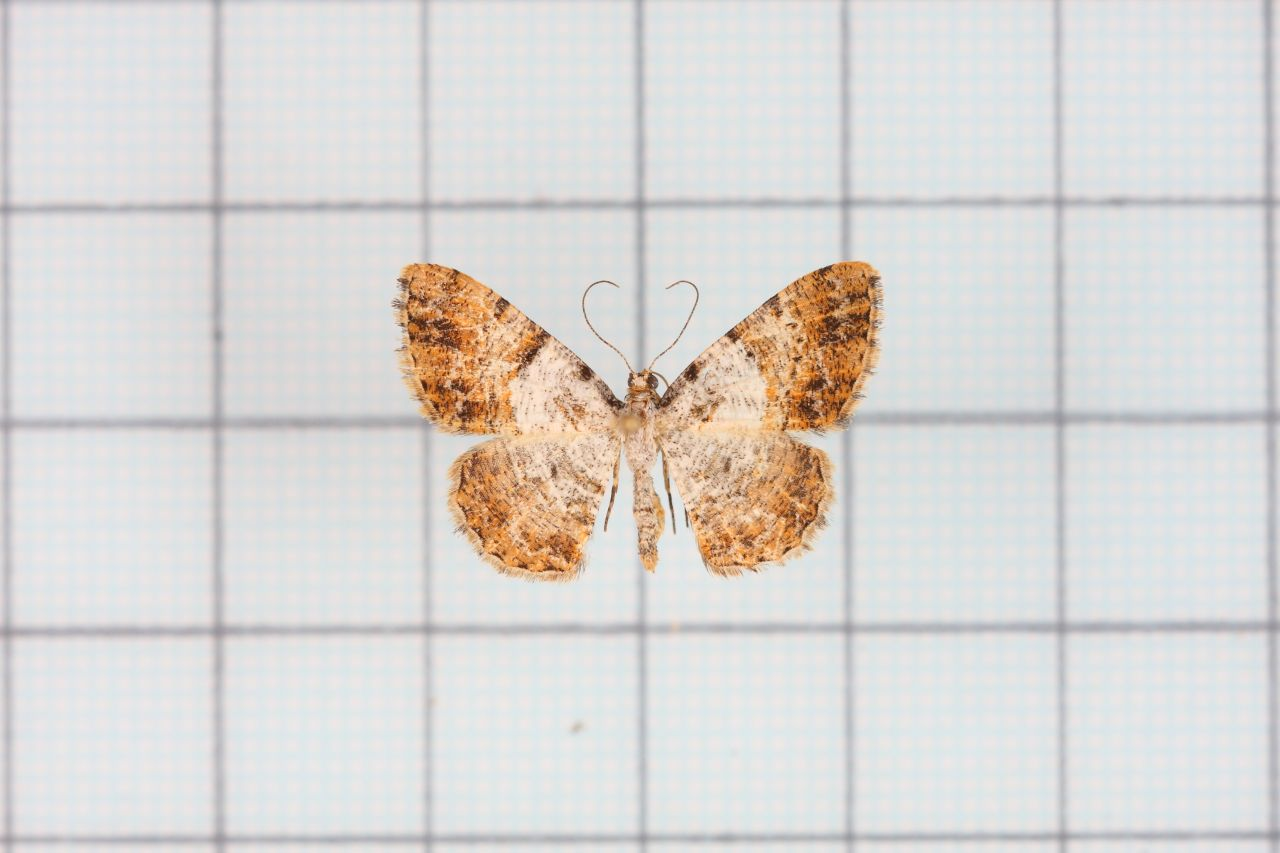

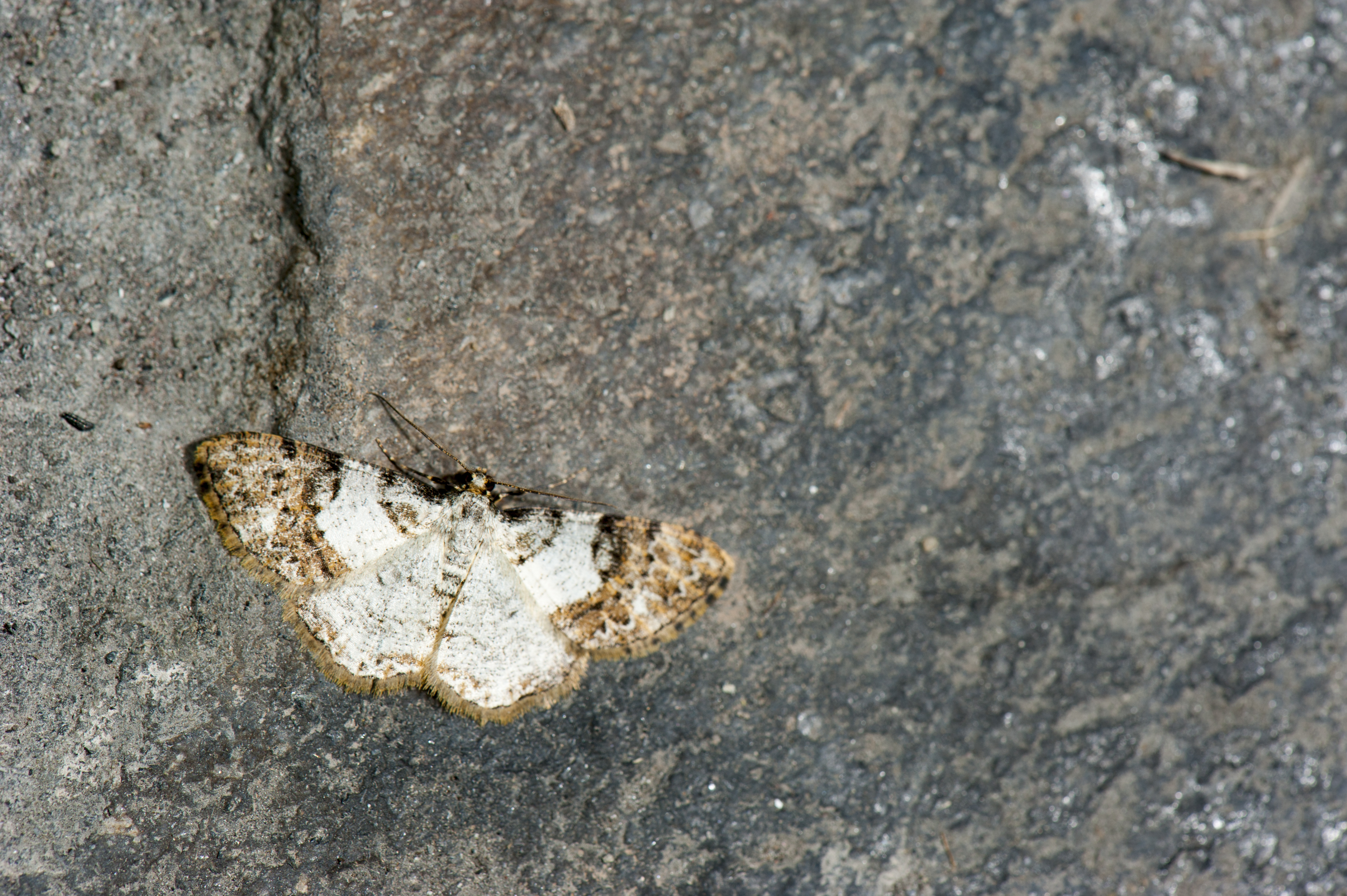

Scientific classification
- Kingdom: Animalia
- Phylum: Arthropoda
- Class: Insecta
- Order: Lepidoptera
- Family: Geometridae
- Genus: Psilalcis
- Species: P. albibasis

Binomial name
- Psilalcis albibasis (Hampson, 1895)

Synonyms
- Boarmia albibasis Hampson, 1895; Myrioblephara albibasis

= Psilalcis albibasis =

Species of moth

Psilalcis albibasis is a moth in the family Geometridae. It is found in India and Taiwan.
