= Bellulia basalia =

Scientific classification
- Domain: Eukaryota
- Kingdom: Animalia
- Phylum: Arthropoda
- Class: Insecta
- Order: Lepidoptera
- Superfamily: Noctuoidea
- Family: Erebidae
- Genus: Bellulia
- Species: B. basalia

Binomial name
- Bellulia basalia Fibiger, 2010

Species of moth

Bellulia basalia is a moth of the family Erebidae first described by Michael Fibiger in 2010. It is known from northern Vietnam.
