= Thisizima bovina =

Scientific classification
- Kingdom: Animalia
- Phylum: Arthropoda
- Class: Insecta
- Order: Lepidoptera
- Family: Tineidae
- Genus: Thisizima
- Species: T. bovina

Binomial name
- Thisizima bovina Meyrick, 1928

Species of moth

Thisizima bovina is a moth of the family Tineidae. It is found on the Andaman Islands.
