= Bellulia antemediana =

Scientific classification
- Domain: Eukaryota
- Kingdom: Animalia
- Phylum: Arthropoda
- Class: Insecta
- Order: Lepidoptera
- Superfamily: Noctuoidea
- Family: Erebidae
- Genus: Bellulia
- Species: B. antemediana

Binomial name
- Bellulia antemediana Fibiger, 2008

Species of moth

Bellulia antemediana is a moth of the family Erebidae first described by Michael Fibiger in 2008. It is known from western Thailand.
