= Spiralisigna pseudofluctuosa =

Scientific classification
- Kingdom: Animalia
- Phylum: Arthropoda
- Clade: Pancrustacea
- Class: Insecta
- Order: Lepidoptera
- Family: Geometridae
- Genus: Spiralisigna
- Species: S. pseudofluctuosa

Binomial name
- Spiralisigna pseudofluctuosa (Holloway, 1979)

Synonyms
- Gymnoscelis pseudofluctuosa Holloway, 1979

Species of moth

Spiralisigna pseudofluctuosa is a moth in the family Geometridae. It is found in New Caledonia.
