= Baroa soricina =

Scientific classification
- Kingdom: Animalia
- Phylum: Arthropoda
- Class: Insecta
- Order: Lepidoptera
- Superfamily: Noctuoidea
- Family: Erebidae
- Subfamily: Arctiinae
- Genus: Baroa
- Species: B. soricina

Binomial name
- Baroa soricina Snellen, 1879

Species of moth

Baroa soricina is a moth of the subfamily Arctiinae. It was described by Snellen in 1879. It is found on Sulawesi.
