= Sigilliclystis lunifera =

Scientific classification
- Kingdom: Animalia
- Phylum: Arthropoda
- Clade: Pancrustacea
- Class: Insecta
- Order: Lepidoptera
- Family: Geometridae
- Genus: Sigilliclystis
- Species: S. lunifera

Binomial name
- Sigilliclystis lunifera (Holloway, 1979)

Synonyms
- Chloroclystis lunifera Holloway, 1979

Species of moth

Sigilliclystis lunifera is a moth in the family Geometridae. It is found on New Caledonia.
