= Spiralisigna acidna =

Scientific classification
- Domain: Eukaryota
- Kingdom: Animalia
- Phylum: Arthropoda
- Class: Insecta
- Order: Lepidoptera
- Family: Geometridae
- Genus: Spiralisigna
- Species: S. acidna

Binomial name
- Spiralisigna acidna (Turner, 1904)

Synonyms
- Gymnoscelis acidna Turner, 1904

Species of moth

Spiralisigna acidna is a moth in the family Geometridae. It is found in Australia and the south-western Pacific, including Fiji.

The larvae feed on the flowers of Myrtus and Acacia species.
