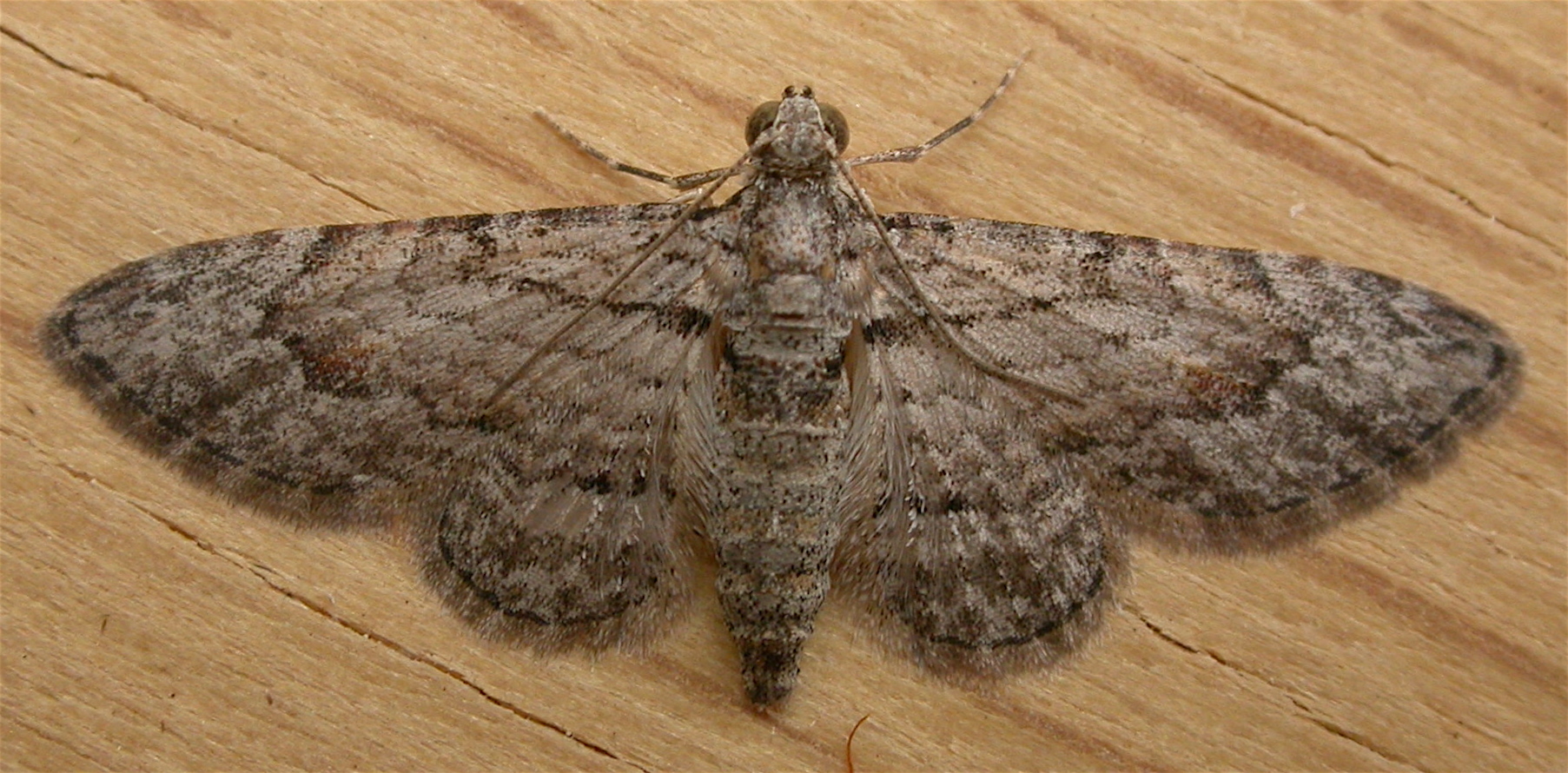

Scientific classification
- Domain: Eukaryota
- Kingdom: Animalia
- Phylum: Arthropoda
- Class: Insecta
- Order: Lepidoptera
- Family: Geometridae
- Genus: Sigilliclystis
- Species: S. insigillata

Binomial name
- Sigilliclystis insigillata (Walker, 1862)

Synonyms
- Eupithecia insigillata Walker, 1862; Chloroclystis insigillata; Eupithecia destructata Walker, 1869

= Sigilliclystis insigillata =

Species of moth

Sigilliclystis insigillata is a species of moth of the family Geometridae. It is found in Australia, including Tasmania. This species has also been introduced to New Zealand.
