= Baroa oryza =

Scientific classification
- Kingdom: Animalia
- Phylum: Arthropoda
- Class: Insecta
- Order: Lepidoptera
- Superfamily: Noctuoidea
- Family: Erebidae
- Subfamily: Arctiinae
- Genus: Baroa
- Species: B. oryza

Binomial name
- Baroa oryza Černý, 2011

Species of moth

Baroa oryza is a moth of the subfamily Arctiinae. It was described by Karel Černý in 2011. It is found in the Philippines, where it is known from the mountains of central Mindanao. The habitat consists of primary mountain forests.

The length of the forewings is 16–17 mm for males and 15–19 mm for females. The ground colour of the forewings is ochreous with chrome-yellow veins.
