= Thisizima antiphanes =

Scientific classification
- Kingdom: Animalia
- Phylum: Arthropoda
- Class: Insecta
- Order: Lepidoptera
- Family: Tineidae
- Genus: Thisizima
- Species: T. antiphanes

Binomial name
- Thisizima antiphanes Meyrick, 1894

Species of moth

Thisizima antiphanes is a moth of the family Tineidae. It is found in Burma and Thailand.
