= Thisizima ceratella =

Scientific classification
- Kingdom: Animalia
- Phylum: Arthropoda
- Class: Insecta
- Order: Lepidoptera
- Family: Tineidae
- Genus: Thisizima
- Species: T. ceratella

Binomial name
- Thisizima ceratella Walker, 1864

Species of moth

Thisizima ceratella is a moth of the family Tineidae. It is found in India, Burma, Thailand, western Malaysia and on the Anambas Islands.

== Description ==
Adults are small to medium-sized moths, consistent with most Tineidae, with wingspans typical for the genus. The forewings are elongate and held roofwise over the body at rest.
