= Baroa peniculata =

Scientific classification
- Domain: Eukaryota
- Kingdom: Animalia
- Phylum: Arthropoda
- Class: Insecta
- Order: Lepidoptera
- Superfamily: Noctuoidea
- Family: Erebidae
- Subfamily: Arctiinae
- Tribe: Arctiini
- Subtribe: Incertae sedis
- Genus: Baroa
- Species: B. peniculata

Binomial name
- Baroa peniculata Černý, 2011

Species of moth

Baroa peniculata is a moth of the family Erebidae. It was described by Karel Černý in 2011. It is found on Luzon in the Philippines. The habitat consists of primary forests in high montane regions.

The length of the forewings is 15–18 mm for males and 16–19 mm for females. Adults have been recorded on wing from January to February, in April, June, August, September and November.

== Etymology ==
The species name refers to the brush-like form of the yellow patagia tips and is derived from peniculus (meaning brush).
