= Thisizima sedilis =

Scientific classification
- Kingdom: Animalia
- Phylum: Arthropoda
- Class: Insecta
- Order: Lepidoptera
- Family: Tineidae
- Genus: Thisizima
- Species: T. sedilis

Binomial name
- Thisizima sedilis Meyrick, 1907

Species of moth

Thisizima sedilis is a species of moth in the family Tineidae. It is found in Bhutan, India (Sikkim), Burma and Thailand.
