= Bellulia bibella =

Scientific classification
- Kingdom: Animalia
- Phylum: Arthropoda
- Clade: Pancrustacea
- Class: Insecta
- Order: Lepidoptera
- Superfamily: Noctuoidea
- Family: Erebidae
- Genus: Bellulia
- Species: B. bibella

Binomial name
- Bellulia bibella Fibiger, 2011

Species of moth

Bellulia bibella is a moth of the family Erebidae first described by Michael Fibiger in 2011. It is known from Yunnan in China.
