= Spiralisigna subpumilata =

Scientific classification
- Kingdom: Animalia
- Phylum: Arthropoda
- Class: Insecta
- Order: Lepidoptera
- Family: Geometridae
- Genus: Spiralisigna
- Species: S. subpumilata

Binomial name
- Spiralisigna subpumilata (Inoue, 1972)

Synonyms
- Gymnoscelis subpumilata Inoue, 1972

Species of moth

Spiralisigna subpumilata is a moth in the family Geometridae. It is found in mainland Japan, the Ryukyu Islands, Hong Kong, as well as Taiwan and Russia.
