= Baroa punctivaga =

Scientific classification
- Kingdom: Animalia
- Phylum: Arthropoda
- Class: Insecta
- Order: Lepidoptera
- Superfamily: Noctuoidea
- Family: Erebidae
- Subfamily: Arctiinae
- Genus: Baroa
- Species: B. punctivaga

Binomial name
- Baroa punctivaga (Walker, 1855)

Synonyms
- Cycnia punctivaga Walker, 1855; Baroa nigra Rothschild, 1914

Species of moth

Baroa punctivaga is a moth of the subfamily Arctiinae. It was described by Francis Walker in 1855 and is found on Java.
