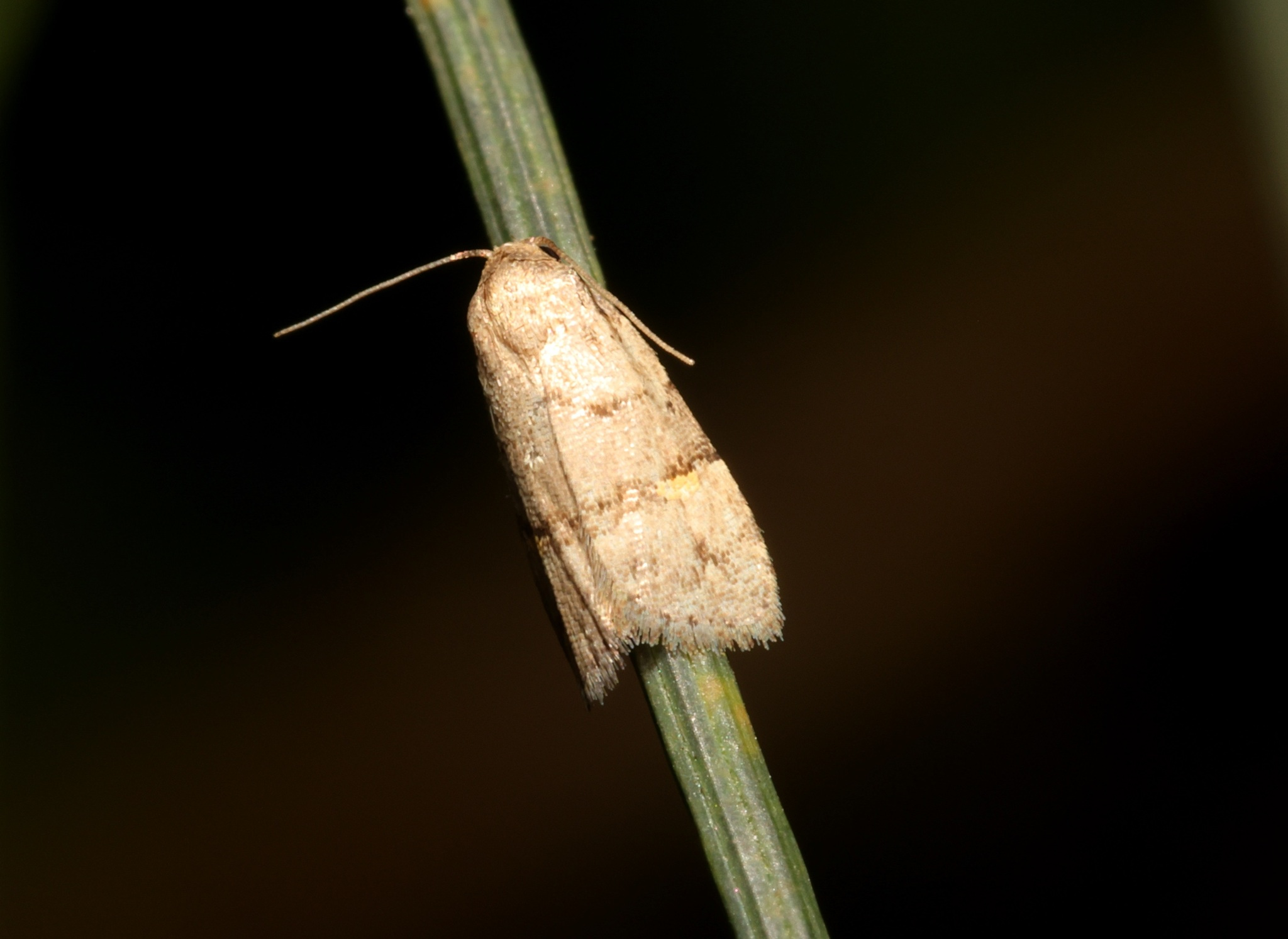
- Fustius sterlingi

Scientific classification
- Kingdom: Animalia
- Phylum: Arthropoda
- Class: Insecta
- Order: Lepidoptera
- Superfamily: Noctuoidea
- Family: Erebidae
- Subtribe: Tactusina
- Genus: Fustius; Fibiger, 2011

Synonyms
- Fustis Fibiger, 2010 (preocc. Lin, 1932)

= Fustius =

Genus of moths

Fustius is a genus of moths of the family Erebidae erected by Michael Fibiger in 2011.

== Species ==
- Fustius sterlingi Fibiger, 2010
- Fustius malaysiensis Fibiger, 2010
- Fustius parasensora Fibiger, 2010
- Fustius sensora Fibiger, 2010
- Fustius biextuta Fibiger, 2010
- Fustius extuta Fibiger, 2010
- Fustius gregerseni Fibiger, 2010
- Fustius s-forma Fibiger, 2010
- Fustius papei Fibiger, 2010
