= Baroa punctibasalis =

Scientific classification
- Domain: Eukaryota
- Kingdom: Animalia
- Phylum: Arthropoda
- Class: Insecta
- Order: Lepidoptera
- Superfamily: Noctuoidea
- Family: Erebidae
- Subfamily: Arctiinae
- Genus: Baroa
- Species: B. punctibasalis

Binomial name
- Baroa punctibasalis Wileman & West, 1928

Species of moth

Baroa punctibasalis is a moth of the subfamily Arctiinae. It was described by Wileman and West in 1928 and is found on the Philippines (Luzon, Samar and Palawan). The habitat consists of lowland secondary forests.

Adults have been recorded on wing in February and July.
