= Fustius parasensora =

Scientific classification
- Domain: Eukaryota
- Kingdom: Animalia
- Phylum: Arthropoda
- Class: Insecta
- Order: Lepidoptera
- Superfamily: Noctuoidea
- Family: Erebidae
- Genus: Fustius
- Species: F. parasensora

Binomial name
- Fustius parasensora (Fibiger, 2010)

Synonyms
- Fustis parasensora Fibiger, 2010

Species of moth

Fustius parasensora is a moth of the family Erebidae first described by Michael Fibiger in 2010. It is known from southern Laos.

== Description ==
The wingspan is about 10mm.
