= Spiralisigna angusta =

Scientific classification
- Domain: Eukaryota
- Kingdom: Animalia
- Phylum: Arthropoda
- Class: Insecta
- Order: Lepidoptera
- Family: Geometridae
- Genus: Spiralisigna
- Species: S. angusta

Binomial name
- Spiralisigna angusta Hausmann & Skou, 2008

Species of moth

Spiralisigna angusta is a moth in the family Geometridae. It is found in the United Arab Emirates.
