= Horniolus =

Scientific classification
- Kingdom: Animalia
- Phylum: Arthropoda
- Clade: Pancrustacea
- Class: Insecta
- Order: Coleoptera
- Suborder: Polyphaga
- Infraorder: Cucujiformia
- Family: Coccinellidae
- Tribe: Coccidulini
- Genus: Horniolus; Weise, 1901

Genus of insects

Horniolus is a genus of beetles belonging to the family Coccinellidae.

== Species ==
- Horniolus amamiensis
- Horniolus bimaculatus
- Horniolus darjeelingensis
- Horniolus dispar
- Horniolus fortunatus
- Horniolus guimeti
- Horniolus hainanensis
- Horniolus hisamatsui
- Horniolus kyushuensis
- Horniolus longitubus
- Horniolus minutus
- Horniolus nepalensis
- Horniolus nigripes
- Horniolus novempunctatus
- Horniolus okinawaensis
- Horniolus siamensis
- Horniolus sonduongensis
- Horniolus sororius
- Horniolus vietnamicus
- Horniolus wiolettae
