= Thisizima bubalopa =

Scientific classification
- Kingdom: Animalia
- Phylum: Arthropoda
- Class: Insecta
- Order: Lepidoptera
- Family: Tineidae
- Genus: Thisizima
- Species: T. bubalopa

Binomial name
- Thisizima bubalopa Meyrick, 1911

Species of moth

Thisizima bubalopa is a moth of the family Tineidae. It is found in Sri Lanka and India.
