= Bellulia postea =

Scientific classification
- Domain: Eukaryota
- Kingdom: Animalia
- Phylum: Arthropoda
- Class: Insecta
- Order: Lepidoptera
- Superfamily: Noctuoidea
- Family: Erebidae
- Genus: Bellulia
- Species: B. postea

Binomial name
- Bellulia postea Fibiger, 2010

Species of moth

Bellulia postea is a moth of the family Erebidae first described by Michael Fibiger in 2010. It is native to northern Vietnam.
