= Fustius s-forma =

Scientific classification
- Domain: Eukaryota
- Kingdom: Animalia
- Phylum: Arthropoda
- Class: Insecta
- Order: Lepidoptera
- Superfamily: Noctuoidea
- Family: Erebidae
- Genus: Fustius
- Species: F. s-forma

Binomial name
- Fustius s-forma (Fibiger, 2010)

Synonyms
- Fustis s-forma Fibiger, 2010

Species of moth

Fustius s-forma is a moth of the family Erebidae first described by Michael Fibiger in 2010. It is known from Thailand.

The wingspan is about 13.5 mm.
