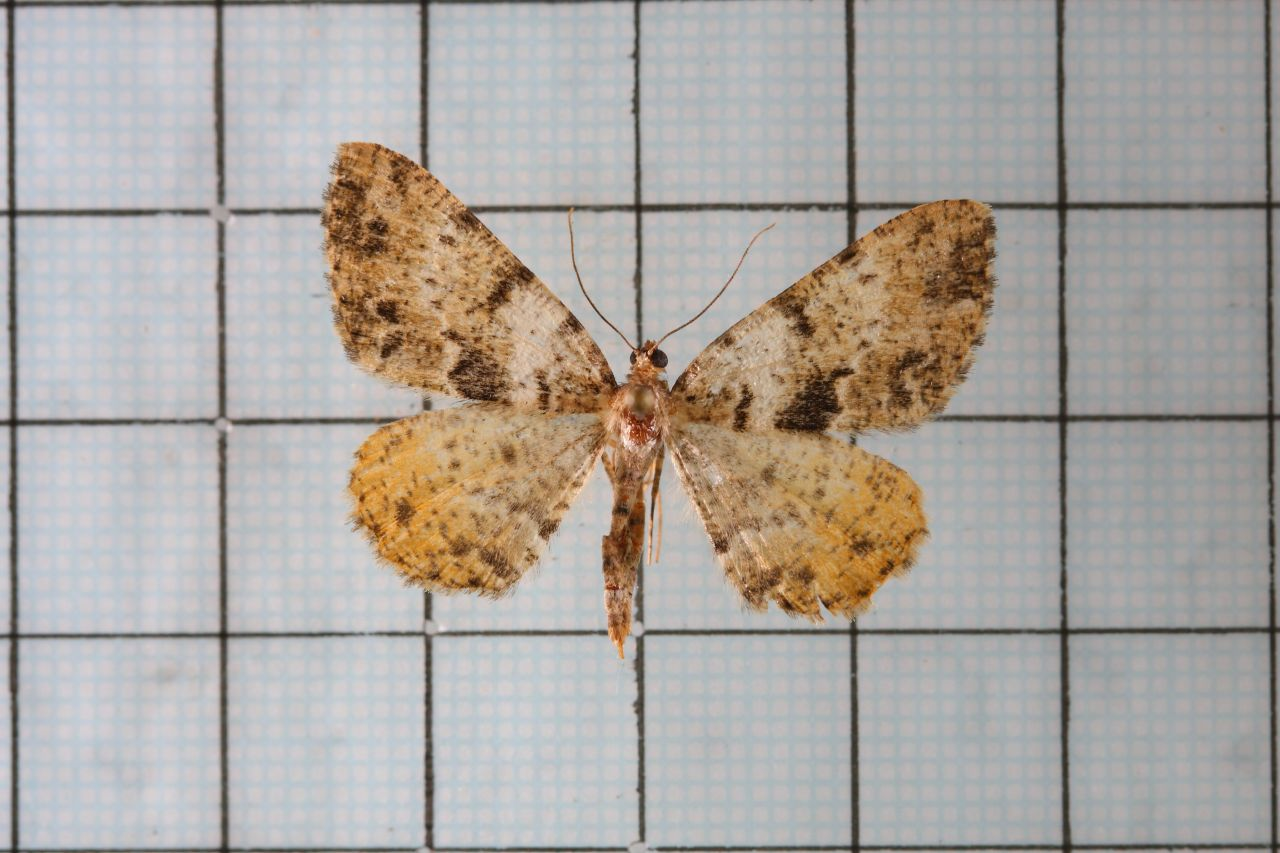

Scientific classification
- Domain: Eukaryota
- Kingdom: Animalia
- Phylum: Arthropoda
- Class: Insecta
- Order: Lepidoptera
- Family: Geometridae
- Genus: Psilalcis
- Species: P. nigrifasciata

Binomial name
- Psilalcis nigrifasciata (Wileman, 1912)

Synonyms
- Alcis nigrifasciata Wileman, 1912 (nec. Alcis nigrifasciata Warren, 1896)

= Psilalcis nigrifasciata =

Species of moth

Psilalcis nigrifasciata is a moth in the family Geometridae. It is found in Taiwan
