= Horniolus dispar =

Scientific classification
- Kingdom: Animalia
- Phylum: Arthropoda
- Clade: Pancrustacea
- Class: Insecta
- Order: Coleoptera
- Suborder: Polyphaga
- Infraorder: Cucujiformia
- Family: Coccinellidae
- Genus: Horniolus
- Species: H. dispar

Binomial name
- Horniolus dispar Weise, 1900

Species of beetle

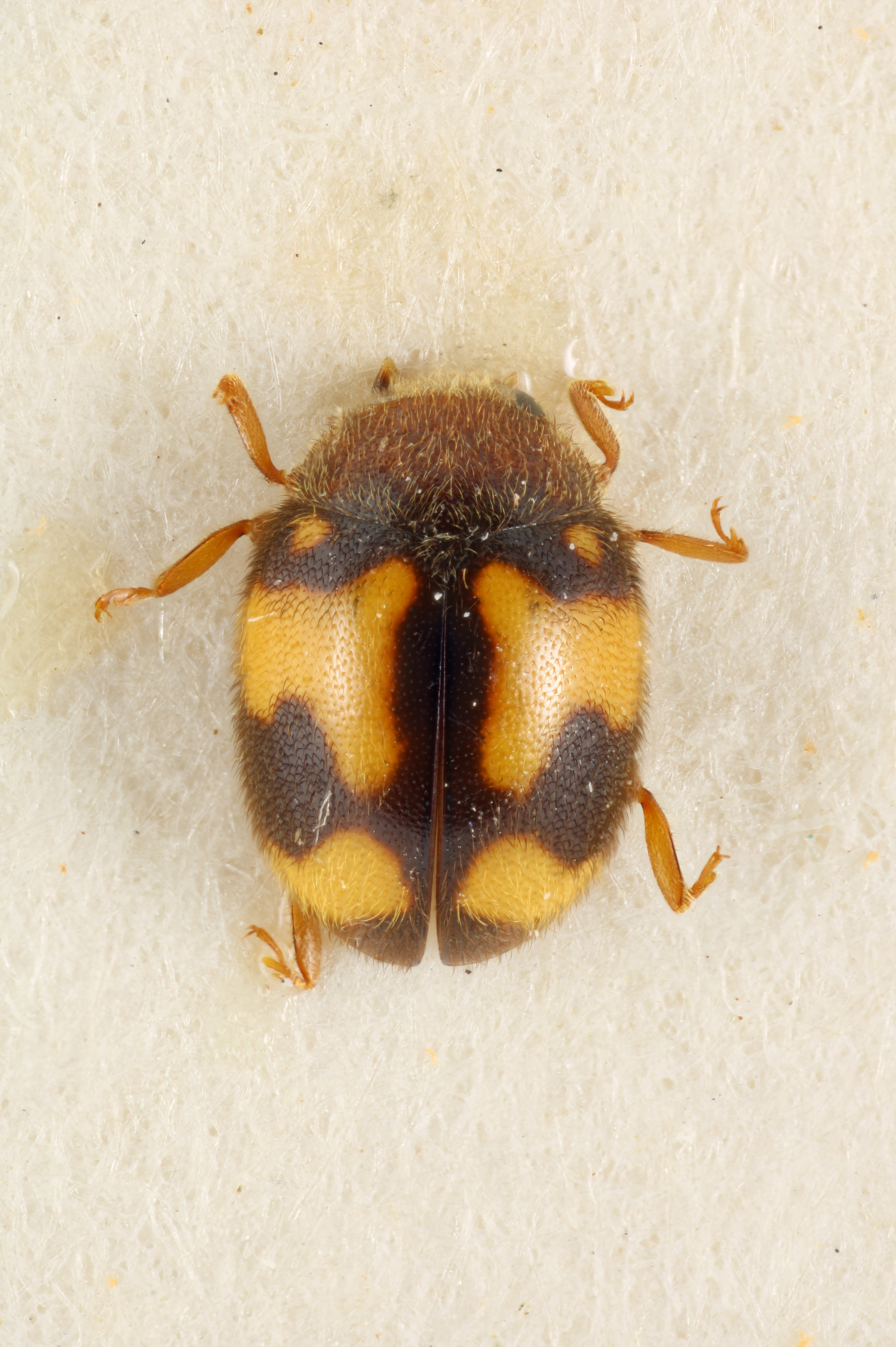
Photo of Horniolus dispar

Horniolus dispar, is a species of lady beetle found in Sri Lanka.

== Description ==
Body rounded or elongate oval. Antennae with 11 antennomeres. Abdomen consists with six ventrites. Tarsi with four tarsomeres. Head transverse. Eyes are moderately large. Clypeus truncate anteriorly. Pronotum moderately convex. Prosternum is T-shaped with prosternal process bearing an inverted Y-shaped carina. Scutellum moderately large and triangular-shaped. Elytra distinctly wider than pronotum at base, surface finely punctate. Elytral epipleuron is narrow and nearly horizontal. Legs are stout and long. Femora of hind leg is broad and flattened. Tibiae without an apical spur.
