= Dichomeris argentenigera =

Scientific classification
- Kingdom: Animalia
- Phylum: Arthropoda
- Class: Insecta
- Order: Lepidoptera
- Family: Gelechiidae
- Genus: Dichomeris
- Species: D. argentenigera

Binomial name
- Dichomeris argentenigera Li, Zhen & Kendrick, 2010

Species of moth

Dichomeris argentenigera is a moth in the family Gelechiidae. It was described by Hou-Hun Li, Hui Zhen and Roger C. Kendrick in 2010. It is found in China (Hong Kong, Hubei).

The wingspan is 17–19 mm for males.

== Etymology ==
The species name refers to the colour of the forewings and is derived from the Latin prefix argente- (meaning silvery) and the word niger (meaning black).
