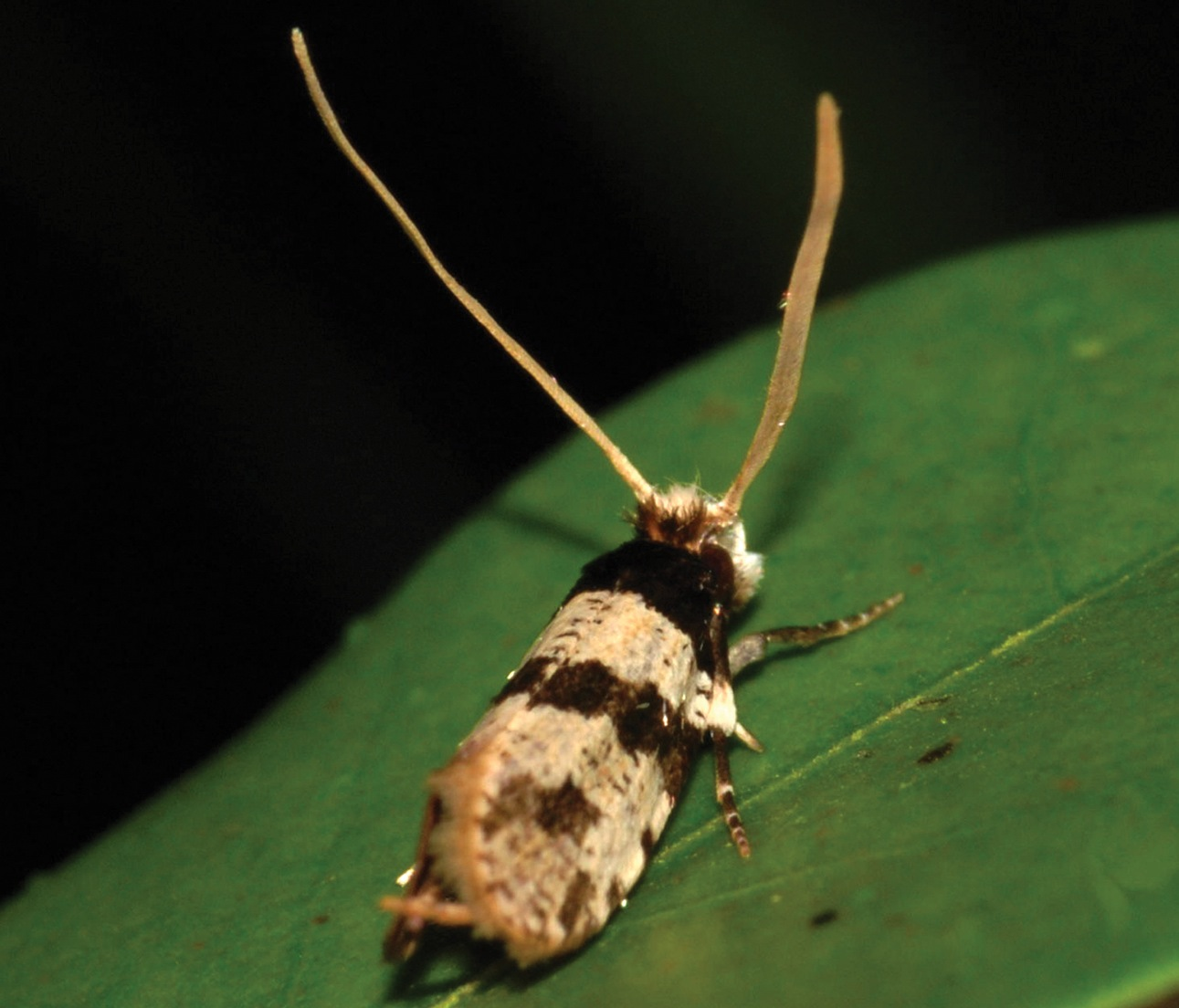
- Thisizima fasciaria

Scientific classification
- Kingdom: Animalia
- Phylum: Arthropoda
- Clade: Pancrustacea
- Class: Insecta
- Order: Lepidoptera
- Family: Tineidae
- Genus: Thisizima; Walker, 1864

= Thisizima =

Genus of moths

Thisizima is a genus of moths belonging to the family Tineidae.

== Species ==
- Thisizima antiphanes Meyrick, 1894
- Thisizima bovina Meyrick, 1928
- Thisizima bubalopa Meyrick, 1911
- Thisizima ceratella Walker, 1864
- Thisizima fasciaria Yang, Li & Kendrick, 2012
- Thisizima sedilis Meyrick, 1907
- Thisizima subceratella Yang, Li & Kendrick, 2012
