= Siamusotima disrupta =

Scientific classification
- Domain: Eukaryota
- Kingdom: Animalia
- Phylum: Arthropoda
- Class: Insecta
- Order: Lepidoptera
- Family: Crambidae
- Genus: Siamusotima
- Species: S. disrupta

Binomial name
- Siamusotima disrupta Solis, in Solis, Pratt, Makinson, Zonneveld & Lake, 2017

Species of moth

Siamusotima disrupta is a species of stem-boring moth of the family Crambidae first described by Maria Alma Solis et al. in 2017.
