= Sigilliclystis kendricki =

Scientific classification
- Domain: Eukaryota
- Kingdom: Animalia
- Phylum: Arthropoda
- Class: Insecta
- Order: Lepidoptera
- Family: Geometridae
- Genus: Sigilliclystis
- Species: S. kendricki

Binomial name
- Sigilliclystis kendricki Galsworthy, 1999

Species of moth

Sigilliclystis kendricki is a moth in the family Geometridae. It is found in Hong Kong and probably inland China.

The length of the forewings is about 9 mm for males and 10 mm for females.
