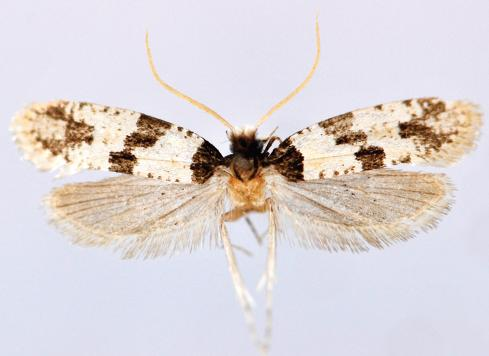

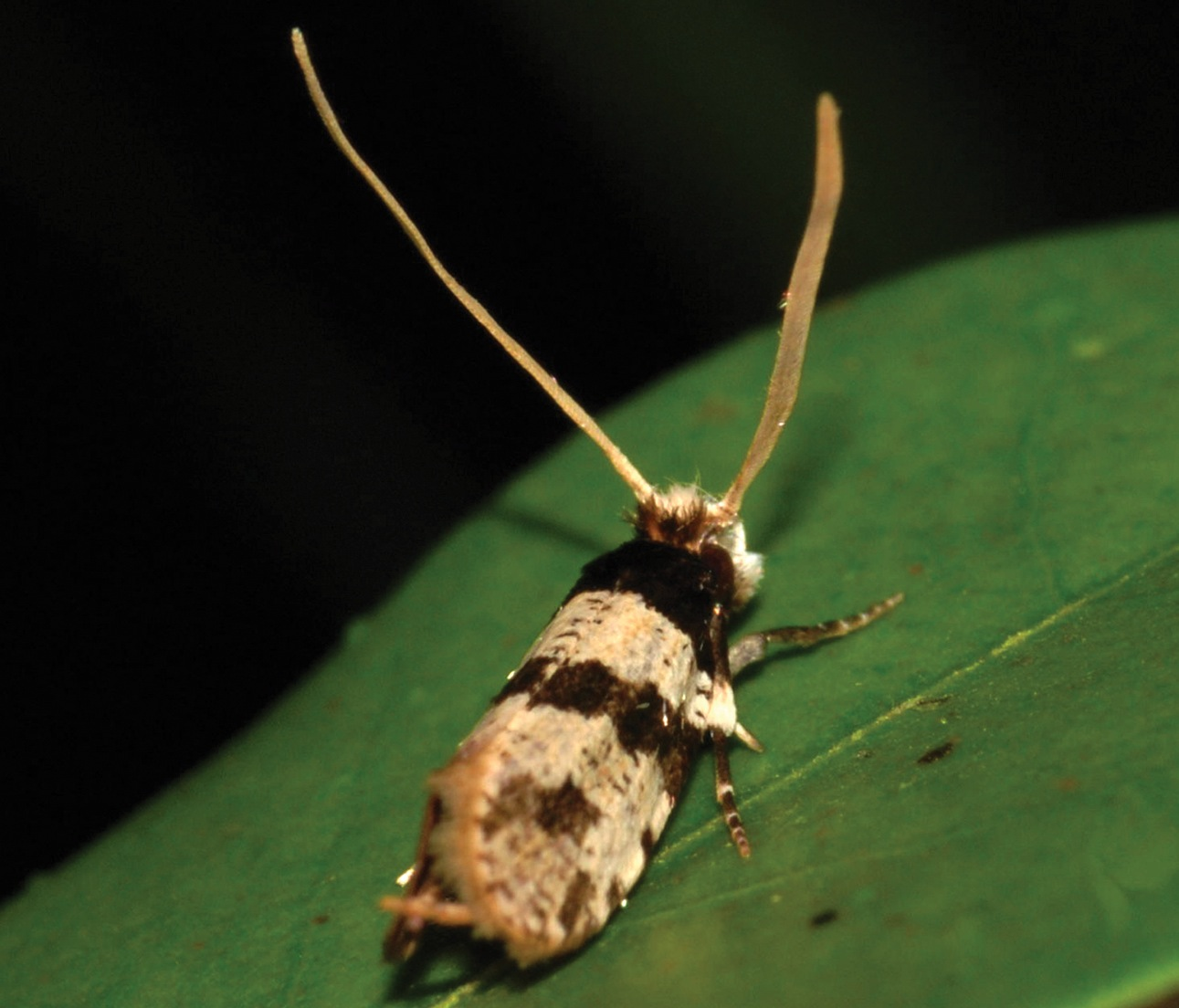

Scientific classification
- Kingdom: Animalia
- Phylum: Arthropoda
- Class: Insecta
- Order: Lepidoptera
- Family: Tineidae
- Genus: Thisizima
- Species: T. fasciaria

Binomial name
- Thisizima fasciaria Yang, Li & Kendrick, 2012

= Thisizima fasciaria =

Species of moth

Thisizima fasciaria is a moth of the family Tineidae. It is found in China (Fujian, Hong Kong).

The wingspan is 13−15 mm for males and 17 mm for females. The forewing ground color is bright white with a black triangular patch from the costal margin to the dorsum on the basal 1/6 and an oblique, black fascia from the basal 1/3 to just before the middle of the dorsum. There is also a rectangular black patch from the outer margin of the cell to the distal 1/6 of the forewing, confluent with two black subtriangular patches from the costa and termen before apex respectively, forming a broad Y-shaped pattern. Furthermore, there are two black costal spots between the oblique fascia and the Y-shaped pattern. The termen and dorsum are scattered with faint dark brown dots. The fringe is yellowish brown. The hindwings are light grayish brown with a gray fringe.

== Etymology ==
The specific name is derived from Latin fasciarius (meaning fascia) and refers to the oblique, black fascia near the middle of the forewing.
