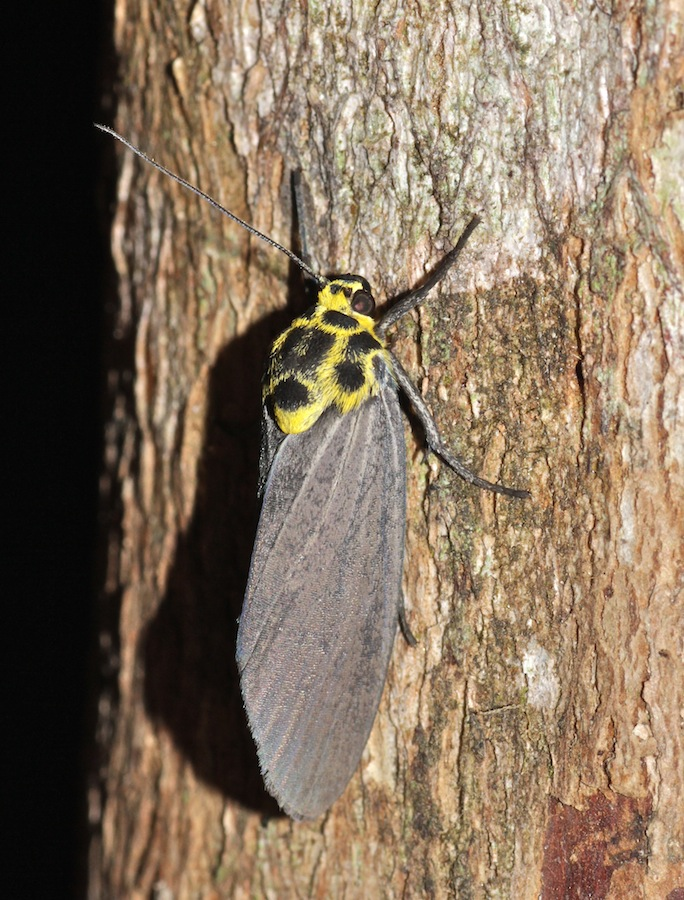
- Borneo, Trusmadi hill dipterocarp forest

Scientific classification
- Kingdom: Animalia
- Phylum: Arthropoda
- Class: Insecta
- Order: Lepidoptera
- Superfamily: Noctuoidea
- Family: Erebidae
- Subfamily: Arctiinae
- Tribe: Arctiini
- Subtribe: Incertae sedis
- Genus: Baroa; Moore, 1878

Synonyms
- Baroa Hampson, 1896

= Baroa =

Genus of moths

Baroa is a genus of oriental noctuoid moths, previously in the family Erebidae, subfamily Arctiinae, later Nolidae, Eligminae after Zahiri, 2013.

== Species ==
- Baroa peniculata Černý, 2011
- Baroa oryza Černý, 2011
- Baroa punctibasalis Wileman & West, 1928
- Baroa punctivaga Walker, 1855
- Baroa siamica Hampson, 1911
- Baroa soricina Snellen, 1879
- Baroa vatala Swinhoe, 1894
