= Spiralisigna =

Scientific classification
- Kingdom: Animalia
- Phylum: Arthropoda
- Clade: Pancrustacea
- Class: Insecta
- Order: Lepidoptera
- Family: Geometridae
- Subfamily: Larentiinae
- Tribe: Eupitheciini
- Genus: Spiralisigna; Holloway, 1997

Genus of moths

Spiralisigna is a genus of moths in the family Geometridae.

== Species ==
There are seven recognized species:

- Spiralisigna angusta Hausmann & Skou, 2008
- Spiralisigna acidna (Turner, 1904)
- Spiralisigna bradleyi Inoue, 2002
- Spiralisigna gloriae Galsworthy, 1999
- Spiralisigna minutissima (Swinhoe, 1902)
- Spiralisigna pseudofluctuosa (Holloway, 1979)
- Spiralisigna subpumilata (Inoue, 1972)
