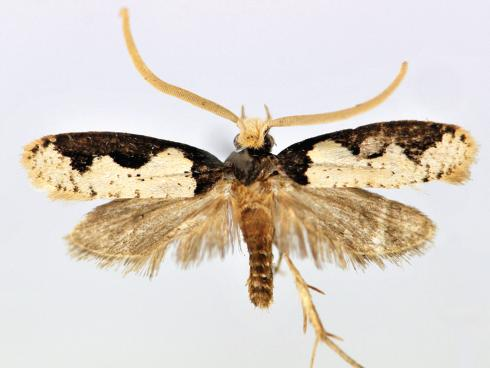

Scientific classification
- Kingdom: Animalia
- Phylum: Arthropoda
- Class: Insecta
- Order: Lepidoptera
- Family: Tineidae
- Genus: Thisizima
- Species: T. subceratella

Binomial name
- Thisizima subceratella Yang, Li & Kendrick, 2012

= Thisizima subceratella =

Species of moth

Thisizima subceratella is a moth of the family Tineidae. It is found in China (Fujian, Hainan, Hong Kong).

The wingspan is 18.5−20.5 for males. The forewing ground color is creamy white, with scattered dark brown scales on the distal ¼. There is a triangular black patch on the basal 1/5 and a broad black costal blotch narrowly confluent with the basal patch on the anterior margin, curved in a W shape on the posterior margin, its basal half apically rounded and reaching half width and the distal half triangularly crossing the midwing. There are two small indistinct spots along the costa before the apex. The termen and dorsum are scattered with faint dark brown dots. The fringe is light yellowish brown. The hindwings are cupreous brown and the fringe is grayish brown.

== Etymology ==
The specific name is derived from the Latin prefix sub- (meaning similar) and another specific name ceratella referring to the similarities of the two species.
