= Dichomeris hamulifera =

Scientific classification
- Kingdom: Animalia
- Phylum: Arthropoda
- Class: Insecta
- Order: Lepidoptera
- Family: Gelechiidae
- Genus: Dichomeris
- Species: D. hamulifera

Binomial name
- Dichomeris hamulifera Li, Zhen & Kendrick, 2010

Species of moth

Dichomeris hamulifera is a moth in the family Gelechiidae. It was described by Hou-Hun Li, Hui Zhen and Roger C. Kendrick in 2010. It is found in Hong Kong, China.

The wingspan is 15–16 mm.
