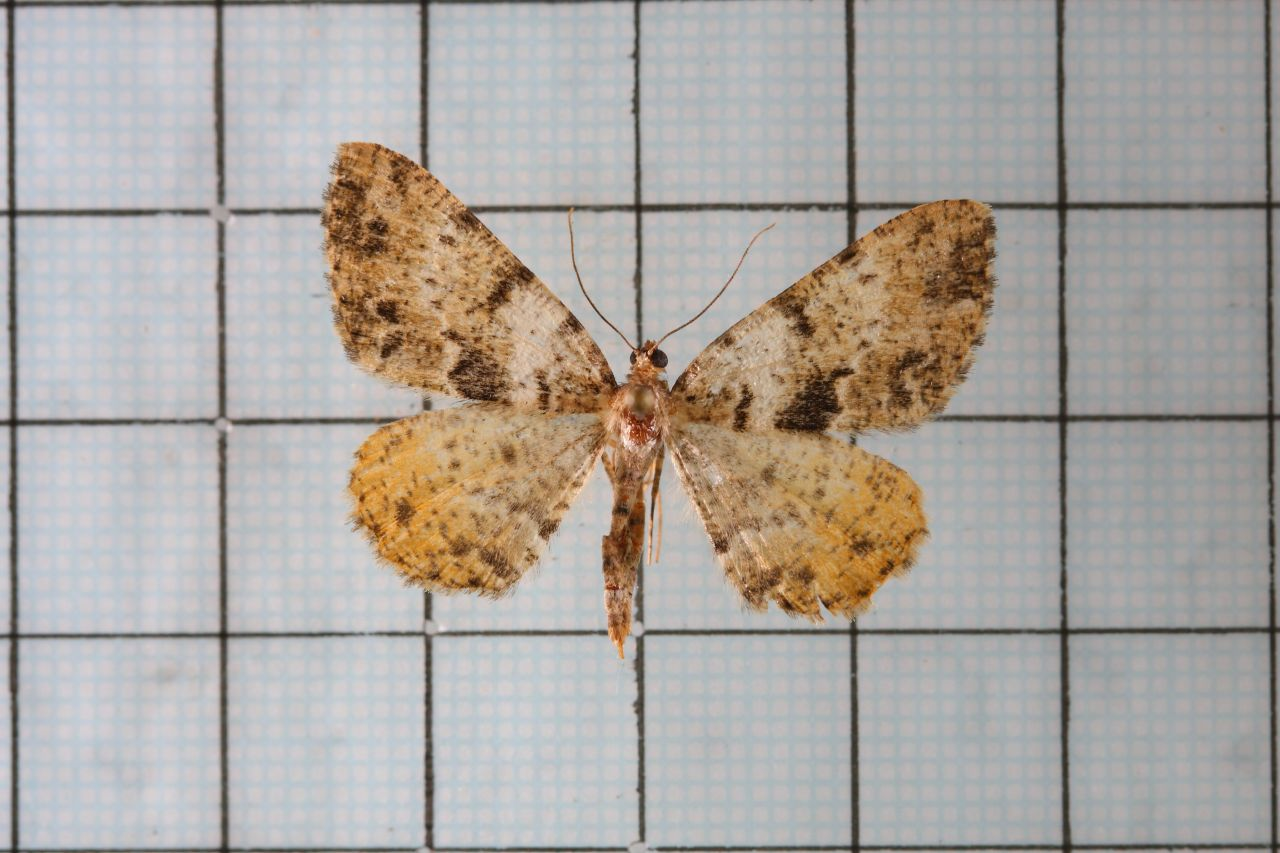
- Psilalcis nigrifasciata (Wileman, 1912)
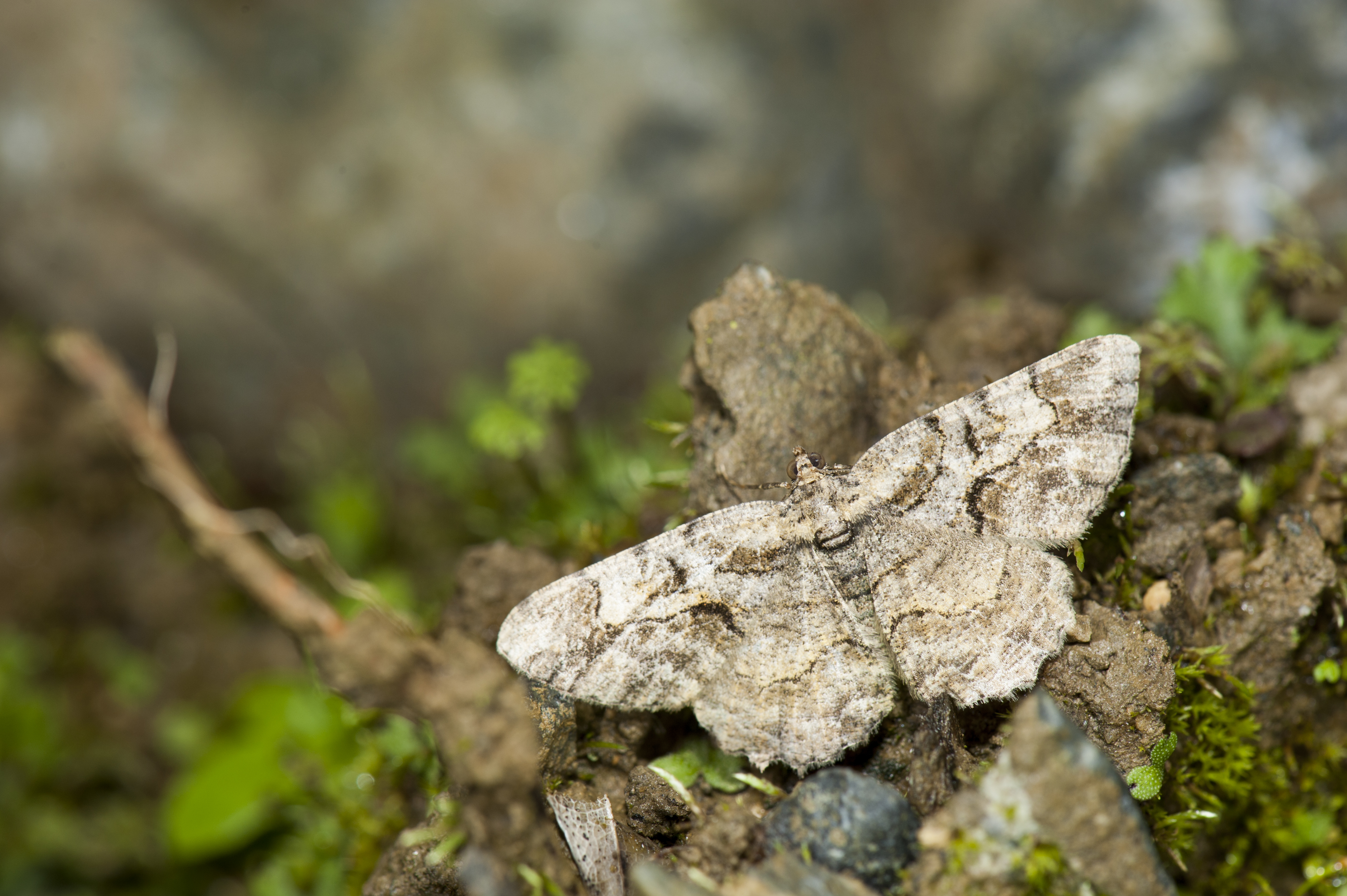
- Psilalcis pulveraria

Scientific classification
- Kingdom: Animalia
- Phylum: Arthropoda
- Class: Insecta
- Order: Lepidoptera
- Family: Geometridae
- Tribe: Boarmiini
- Genus: Psilalcis; Warren, 1893

Synonyms
- Paralcis Warren, 1894; Syllegusina Wehrli, 1943

= Psilalcis =

Genus of moths

Psilalcis is a genus of moths in the family Geometridae, in which it is placed in tribe Boarmiini.

== Species ==
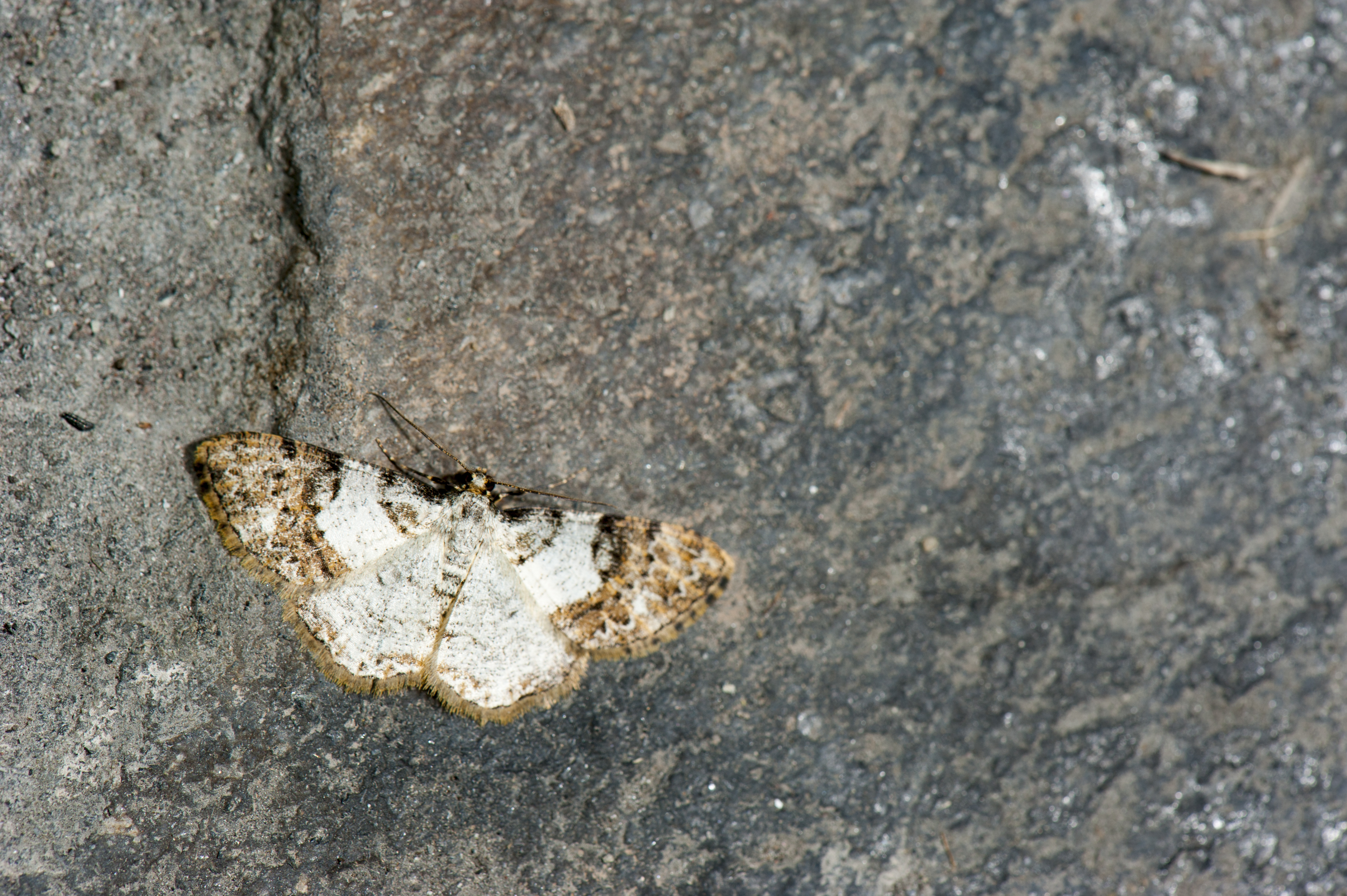
Psilalcis albibasis

- Psilalcis albibasis (Hampson, 1895)
- Psilalcis benefica (Sato, 1993)
- Psilalcis breta (Wileman, 1911)
- Psilalcis conceptaria Holloway, 1994
- Psilalcis diorthogonia (Wehrli, 1925)
- Psilalcis fui Sato, 2002
- Psilalcis inceptaria (Walker, 1866) – type species (as Tephrosia inceptaria Walker, 1866)
- Psilalcis menoides (Wehrli, 1943)
- Psilalcis nigrifasciata (Wileman, 1912)
- Psilalcis paraceptaria Sato, 1996
- Psilalcis pulveraria (Wileman, 1912)
- Psilalcis rotundata Inoue, 1998
- Psilalcis subalbibasis Liu, 2024
- Psilalcis subconceptaria Liu, 2024
- Psilalcis sumatrana Sato, 2013
- Psilalcis vietnamensis Sato, 1996

== Former species ==
- Psilalcis atrifasciata Warren, 1893 – synonym of Parapholodes fuliginea
- Psilalcis dentilinea Warren, 1893 – now Prochasma dentilinea.
