= Dactylispa pungens =

Scientific classification
- Kingdom: Animalia
- Phylum: Arthropoda
- Class: Insecta
- Order: Coleoptera
- Suborder: Polyphaga
- Infraorder: Cucujiformia
- Family: Chrysomelidae
- Genus: Dactylispa
- Species: D. pungens

Binomial name
- Dactylispa pungens (Boheman, 1895)

Synonyms
- Hispa pungens Boheman, 1895; Dactylispa atracumina Gressitt, 1938

Species of beetle

Dactylispa pungens is a species of beetle of the family Chrysomelidae. It is found in China (Hainan, Hong Kong, Jiangxi, Yunnan) and Vietnam.

== Life history ==
The recorded host plants for this species are Burretiodendron species.
