= Siamusotima =

Scientific classification
- Kingdom: Animalia
- Phylum: Arthropoda
- Clade: Pancrustacea
- Class: Insecta
- Order: Lepidoptera
- Family: Crambidae
- Subfamily: Musotiminae
- Genus: Siamusotima; Solis, Yen, Goolsby, Wright, Pemberton, Winotal, Chattrukul, Thagong & Rimbut, 2005

Genus of moths

Siamusotima is a genus of moths of the family Crambidae. The genus was erected by Maria Alma Solis et al. in 2005.

== Species ==
- Siamusotima aranea Solis, Yen, Goolsby, Wright, Pemberton, Winotal, Chattrukul, Thagong & Rimbut, 2005
- Siamusotima disrupta Solis, Pratt, Makinson, Zonneveld & Lake, 2017
