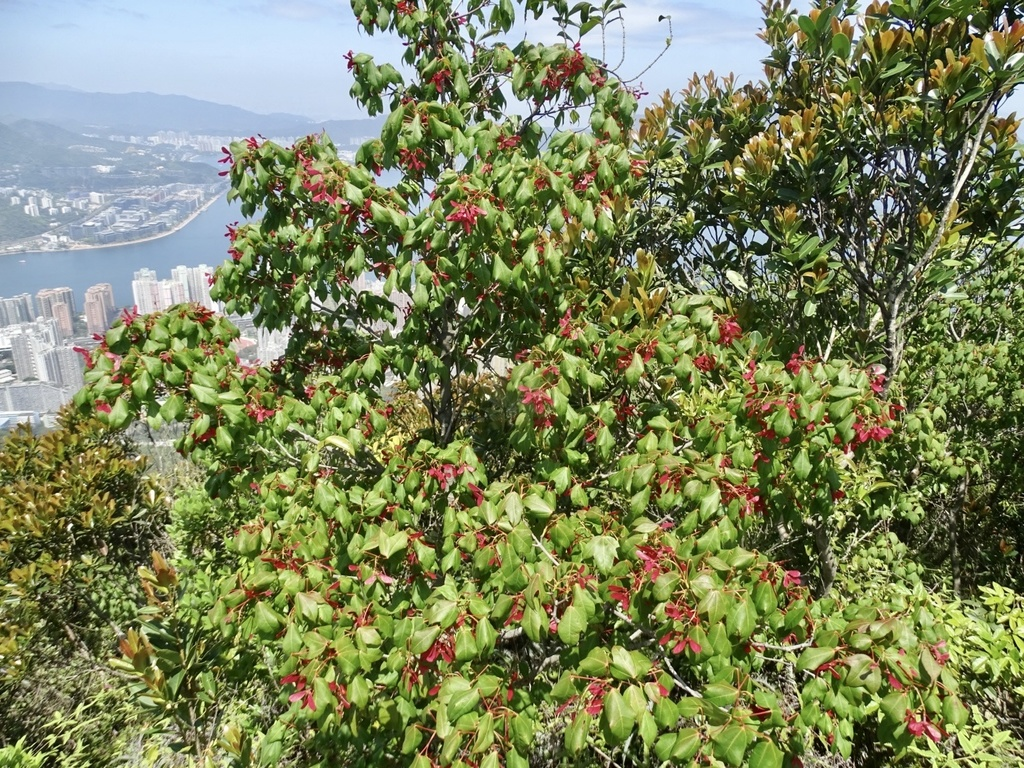

Conservation status
- Least Concern (IUCN 3.1)

Scientific classification
- Kingdom: Plantae
- Clade: Tracheophytes
- Clade: Angiosperms
- Clade: Eudicots
- Clade: Rosids
- Order: Sapindales
- Family: Sapindaceae
- Genus: Acer
- Section: Acer sect. Palmata
- Series: Acer ser. Palmata
- Species: A. tutcheri

Binomial name
- Acer tutcheri Duthie

Subspecies
- Acer tutcheri subsp. formosanum A.E.Murray; Acer tutcheri subsp. tutcheri

Synonyms
- Acer oliverianum var. tutcheri (Duthie) F.P.Metcalf ex Krüssm.

= Acer tutcheri =

Species of maple

Acer tutcheri, or Tutcher's maple, is a species of deciduous maple tree native to the Fujian, Guangdong, Guangxi, south Hunan, south Jiangxi, and south Zhejiang provinces of southern China, as well as Taiwan and certain districts of Hong Kong.

William James Tutcher was credited with the first recorded observation of the species on Lantau Island in 1894.

== Description ==
The species is a small to medium-sized deciduous tree that typically grows 5–10 m tall, occasionally reaching up to 15 m. The bark is brown to dark brown and generally smooth. Young branchlets are purplish-green when immature and hairless.

The leaves are simple and arranged oppositely on the branches. The leaf blade is thin and membranous, broadly ovate in shape. The leaves are up to 9 cm long and 13 cm across, and usually divided into 3–5 lobes. The lobe margins are sparsely serrulate (finely toothed). The leaf base is rounded or slightly truncate, while the apex tapers to a pointed tip (acuminate). The leaf surfaces are generally glabrous, though small tufts of hairs may occur where the veins meet on the underside. Each leaf has three main basal veins.

The species is andromonoecious, meaning it bears both male and bisexual flowers on the same plant. The flowers are arranged in terminal panicles. Each flower has four pale yellowish-white petals, eight red stamens, and a small central pistil in bisexual flowers.

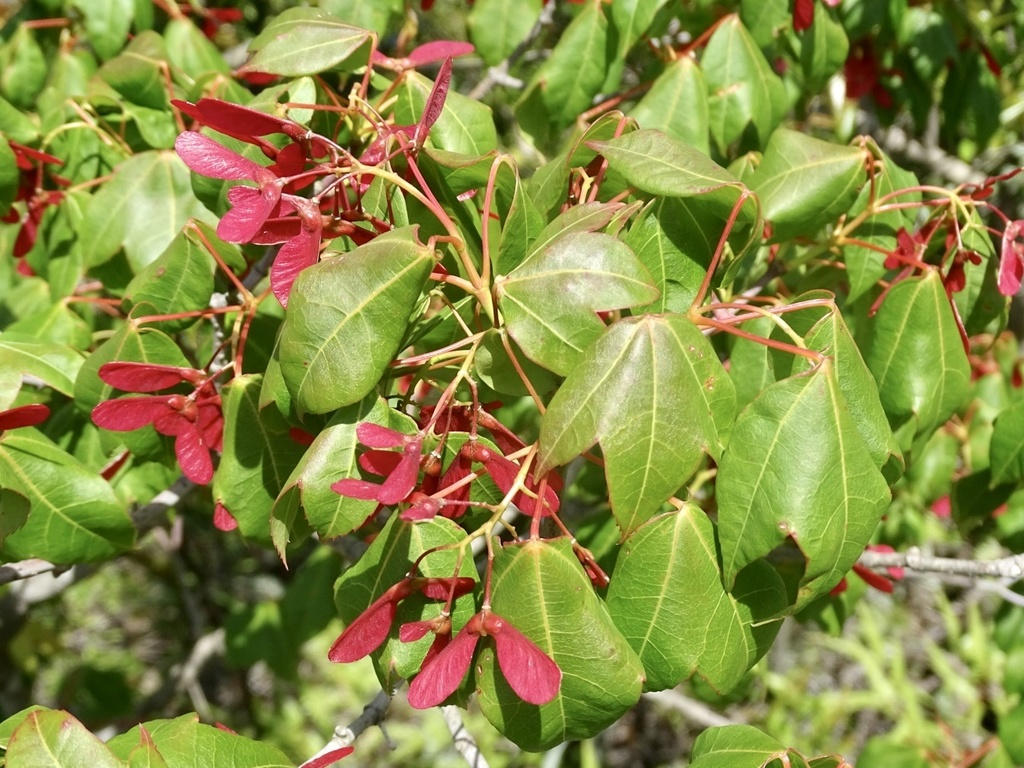

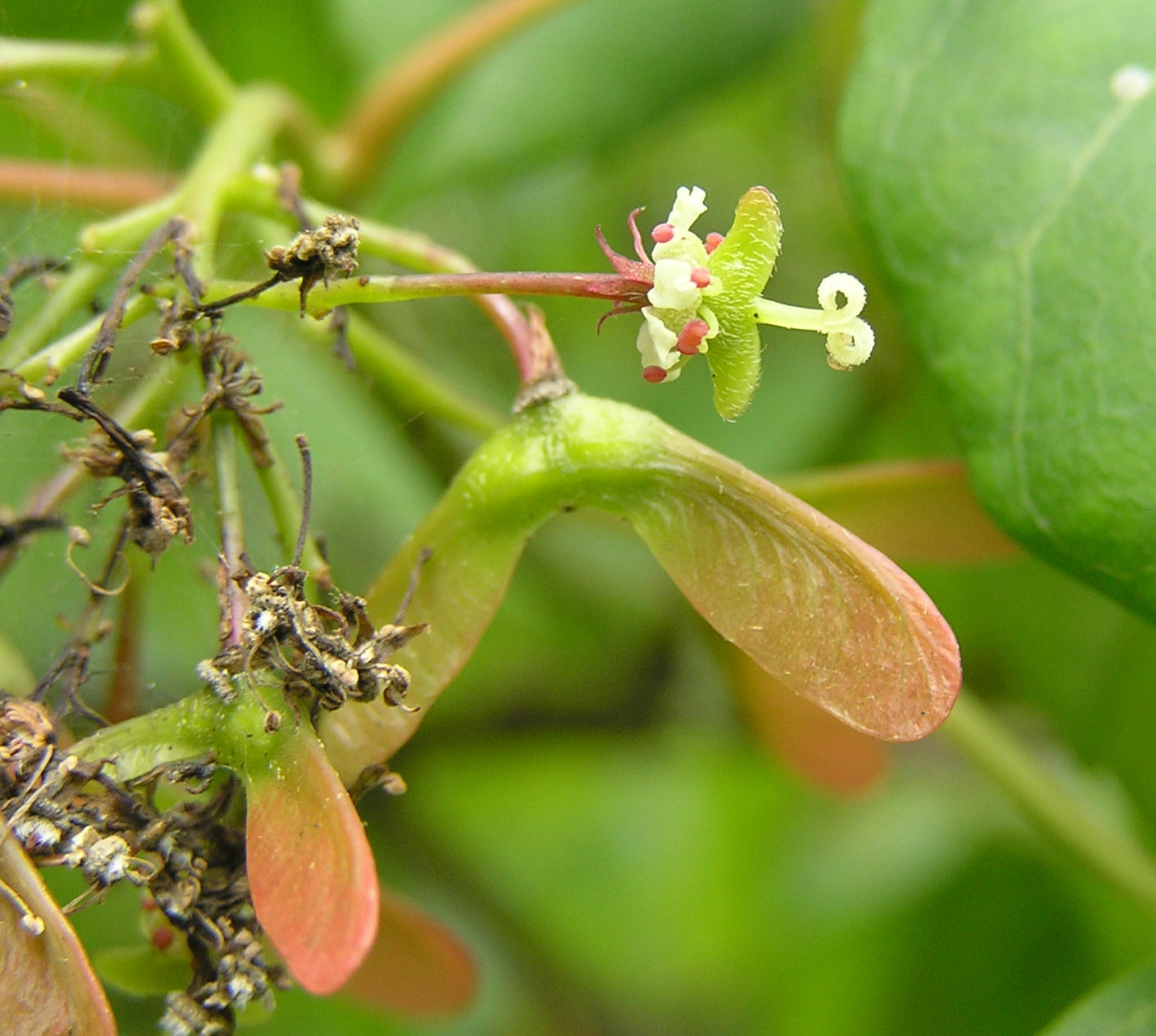

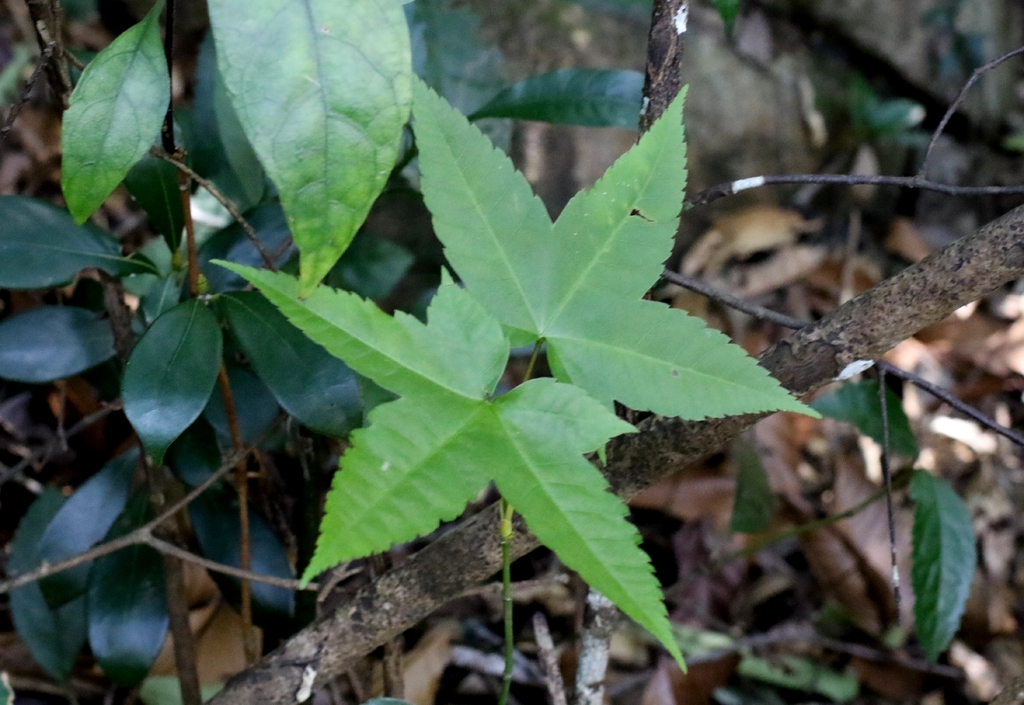

== Distribution ==
Acer tutcheri is found in forests between 300 and 1000 metres elevation.

== Leaf color ==
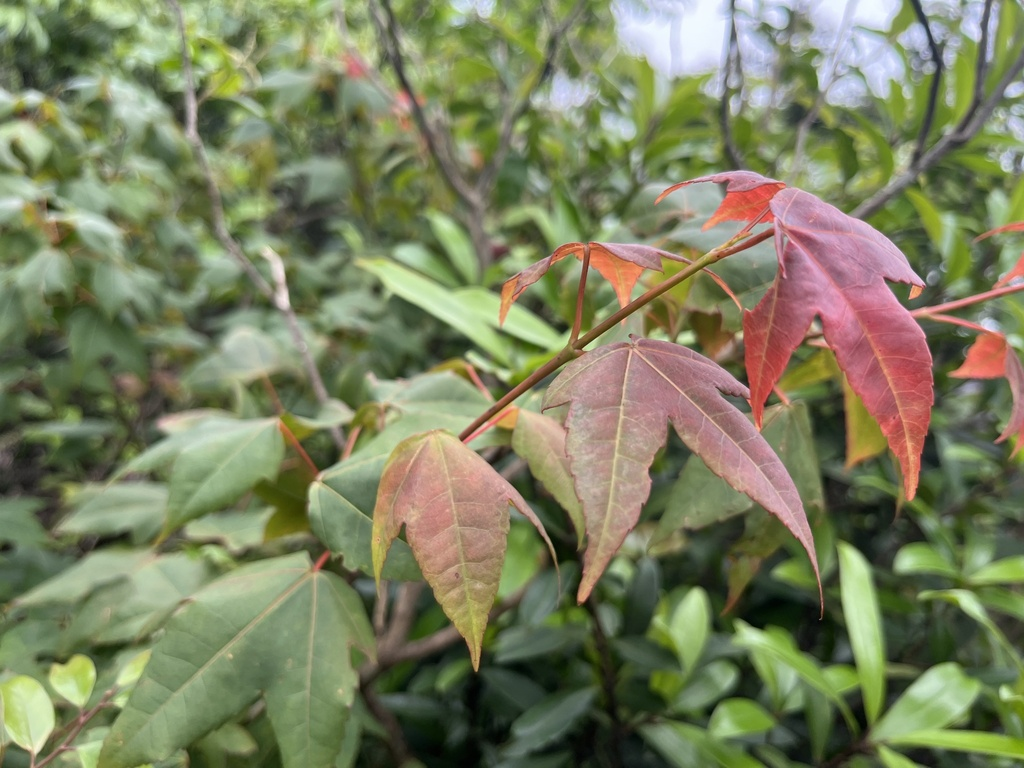

Leaf color is an important factor influencing the ornamental value of Acer tutcheri. Young leaves emerge red, but the color gradually fades as the leaves mature in spring, reducing their ornamental appeal. Research shows that the fading of red leaves is mainly caused by a decrease in the anthocyanin-to-chlorophyll pigment ratio. In the early stage of leaf development, anthocyanin content is relatively high, producing the characteristic red color. As leaves grow, chlorophyll accumulates rapidly and becomes the dominant pigment, causing the leaves to turn green. At the same time, the synthesis of anthocyanins declines while their degradation increases. Rising vacuole pH further reduces anthocyanin stability, accelerating pigment loss.

== Subspecies ==
Two subspecies are accepted.

- Acer tutcheri subsp. formosanum A.E.Murray – Taiwan
- Acer tutcheri subsp. tutcheri – southern China
