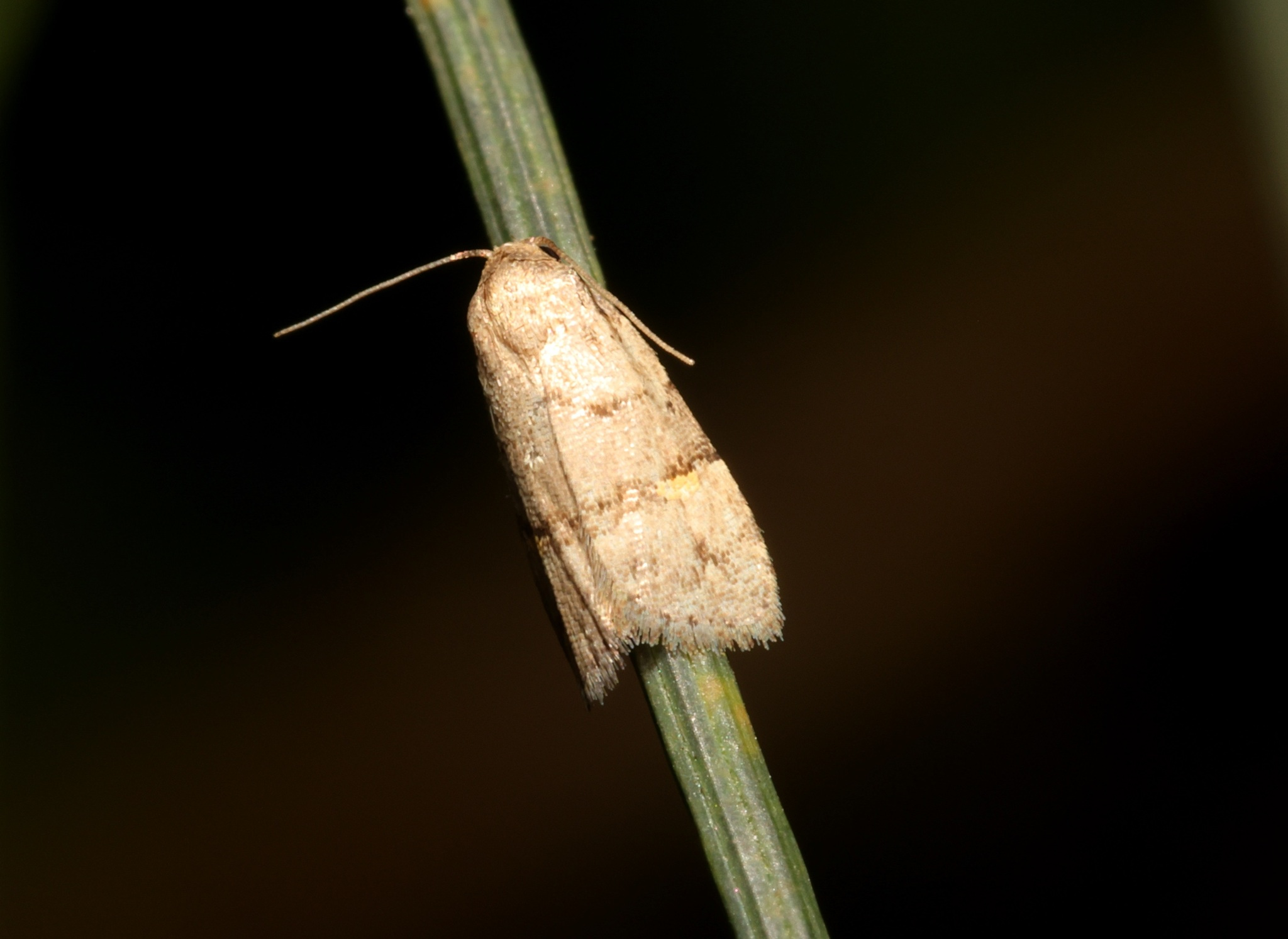

Scientific classification
- Kingdom: Animalia
- Phylum: Arthropoda
- Class: Insecta
- Order: Lepidoptera
- Superfamily: Noctuoidea
- Family: Erebidae
- Genus: Fustius
- Species: F. sterlingi

Binomial name
- Fustius sterlingi Fibiger, 2010

Synonyms
- Fustis sterlingi Fibiger, 2010

= Fustius sterlingi =

Species of moth

Fustius sterlingi is a moth of the family Erebidae first described by Michael Fibiger in 2010. It is known from Hong Kong.

Its wingspan is 7.5-9.5 mm.
