= Horniolus hisamatsui =

Scientific classification
- Kingdom: Animalia
- Phylum: Arthropoda
- Clade: Pancrustacea
- Class: Insecta
- Order: Coleoptera
- Suborder: Polyphaga
- Infraorder: Cucujiformia
- Family: Coccinellidae
- Genus: Horniolus
- Species: H. hisamatsui

Binomial name
- Horniolus hisamatsui Miyatake, 1976

Species of beetle

Horniolus hisamatsui is a species of beetle of the family Coccinellidae. It is found in China (Hong Kong).

== Description ==
Adults reach a length of about 2.6 mm. Adults have a reddish brown head and pronotum and the elytron is black with two yellowish transverse bands.
