= Eupithecia mundiscripta =

Scientific classification
- Domain: Eukaryota
- Kingdom: Animalia
- Phylum: Arthropoda
- Class: Insecta
- Order: Lepidoptera
- Family: Geometridae
- Genus: Eupithecia
- Species: E. mundiscripta

Binomial name
- Eupithecia mundiscripta (Warren, 1907)

Synonyms
- Tephroclystia mundiscripta Warren, 1907; Eupithecia mundiscripta commundata L.B. Prout, 1958; Eupithecia mundiscripta laratensis L.B. Prout, 1958; Eupithecia sekkongensis Galsworthy, 1999

Species of moth

Eupithecia mundiscripta is a moth in the family of Geometridae. It is found in New Guinea, Taiwan, India (Meghalaya), the Philippines, Thailand, Vietnam, Malaysia, Sumatra, Borneo and Seram.

In the tropics, adults are on wing from June to March. In Hong Kong and Taiwan, adults have only been recorded in winter.
