= Sigilliclystis =

Scientific classification
- Kingdom: Animalia
- Phylum: Arthropoda
- Clade: Pancrustacea
- Class: Insecta
- Order: Lepidoptera
- Family: Geometridae
- Tribe: Eupitheciini
- Genus: Sigilliclystis; Galsworthy, 1999

Genus of moths

Sigilliclystis is a genus of moths in the family Geometridae.

== Species ==
- Sigilliclystis encteta (L.B. Prout, 1934)
- Sigilliclystis insigillata (Walker, 1862)
- Sigilliclystis kendricki Galsworthy, 1999
- Sigilliclystis lunifera (Holloway, 1979)
