= Dichomeris parvisexafurca =

Scientific classification
- Kingdom: Animalia
- Phylum: Arthropoda
- Class: Insecta
- Order: Lepidoptera
- Family: Gelechiidae
- Genus: Dichomeris
- Species: D. parvisexafurca

Binomial name
- Dichomeris parvisexafurca Li, Zhen & Kendrick, 2010

Species of moth

Dichomeris parvisexafurca is a moth in the family Gelechiidae. It was described by Hou-Hun Li, Hui Zhen and Roger C. Kendrick in 2010. It is found in Hong Kong, China.

The wingspan is 9.5–10 mm for males.
