= Baroa vatala =

Scientific classification
- Domain: Eukaryota
- Kingdom: Animalia
- Phylum: Arthropoda
- Class: Insecta
- Order: Lepidoptera
- Superfamily: Noctuoidea
- Family: Erebidae
- Subfamily: Arctiinae
- Genus: Baroa
- Species: B. vatala

Binomial name
- Baroa vatala Swinhoe, 1894

Species of moth

Baroa vatala is a moth of the subfamily Arctiinae first described by Charles Swinhoe in 1894. It is found in China (Hong Kong, Jiangxi, Guangdong, Guangxi, Yunnan, Hubei, Hunan), Nepal, Bhutan and India (Assam, Sikkim).
