= Spiralisigna gloriae =

Scientific classification
- Domain: Eukaryota
- Kingdom: Animalia
- Phylum: Arthropoda
- Class: Insecta
- Order: Lepidoptera
- Family: Geometridae
- Genus: Spiralisigna
- Species: S. gloriae

Binomial name
- Spiralisigna gloriae Galsworthy, 1999

Species of moth

Spiralisigna gloriae is a moth in the family Geometridae. It is found in Hong Kong.

The length of the forewings is about 9 mm.
