= List of noctuid genera: G =

The huge moth family Noctuidae contains the following genera:

A B C D E F G H I J K L M N O P Q R S T U V W X Y Z

- Gaala
- Gabara
- Gaberasa
- Gabyna
- Gadera
- Gaedeodes
- Gaedonea
- Galactomoia
- Galanda
- Galapha
- Galeana
- Galgula
- Galleridia
- Gammace
- Gangra
- Gaphara
- Gargaza
- Gaurenopsis
- Gelenipsa
- Geniascota
- Geometrimima
- Gerarctia
- Gerbathodes
- Gerespa
- Geria
- Gerisa
- Geroda
- Gerra
- Gerrodes
- Gesonia
- Gespanna
- Gigaglossa
- Gigia
- Gigides
- Ginaea
- Giria
- Girpa
- Girtesma
- Giscala
- Gisira
- Giubicolanta
- Gizama
- Glaucicodia
- Glenopteris
- Gloanna
- Globosusa
- Gloia
- Gloriana
- Glossodice
- Glympis
- Gnamptocera
- Gnamptogyia
- Gnamptonyx
- Gnathogonia
- Godasa
- Goednes
- Goenycta
- Gomora
- Gonagyra
- Gondysia
- Gonelydna
- Gonepatica
- Gonepteronia
- Goniapteryx
- Goniocarsia
- Goniocraspedon
- Goniocraspedum
- Goniohelia
- Goniophila
- Goniophylla
- Gonioscia
- Goniotermasia
- Gonippa
- Gonitis
- Gonodes
- Gonodonta
- Gonodontodes
- Gonoglasa
- Gonophaea
- Gonopteronia
- Gonospileia
- Gonostygia
- Gonuris
- Goonallica
- Gorgone
- Gorgora
- Gorosina
- Gortyna
- Gortynodes
- Gorua
- Gracillina
- Gracilodes
- Gracilopsis
- Grammesia
- Grammodes
- Grammoscelis
- Graphania
- Graphantha
- Graphigona
- Graphiphora
- Graptocullia
- Graptolitha
- Gravodos
- Griposia
- Grisana
- Grisyigoga
- Grotella
- Grotellaforma
- Grumia
- Gryphadena
- Gryphopogon
- Gueselderia
- Guntia
- Guriauna
- Gustiana
- Gymnelia
- Gynaephila
- Gyophora
- Gypsitea
- Gyrognatha
- Gyrohypsoma
- Gyroprora
- Gyrospilara
- Gyrtona
