= Galanda (disambiguation) =

Galanda may refer to:

- Galanda, a genus of moths of the family Noctuidae
- Giacomo Galanda (born 1975), Italian professional basket player
- Mikuláš Galanda (1895-1938), Slovak painter and illustrator
