= Masca (disambiguation) =

Masca is a village on the island of Tenerife, Spain.

Masca may also refer to:

- Mașca, a village in Iara, Romania
- Mâsca, a village in Șiria, Romania
- Masca (moth), a genus of moths in the family Erebidae
- Francisco Mascarenhas (footballer), also known as "Masca"
- Masca (shaman), shaman women believed to possess healing powers in Piedmontese folklore
