= Graptolita =

Graptolita may be a misspelling for:

- Graptolithina, or graptolites, a widely preserved group of fossil animals
- Graptolitha, a genus of moths
