= Geroda =

Geroda may refer to:

- Geroda (moth), a genus of moth
- Geroda, Lower Franconia, Bavaria, Germany
- Geroda, Thuringia, Germany
- Jayrud (ancient Geroda), a city in Syria
