= Giria =

Giria may refer to

- Giria (moth), a genus of insects in the family Noctuidae
- Giria, India, village in West Bengal, India
- The Battle of Giria
