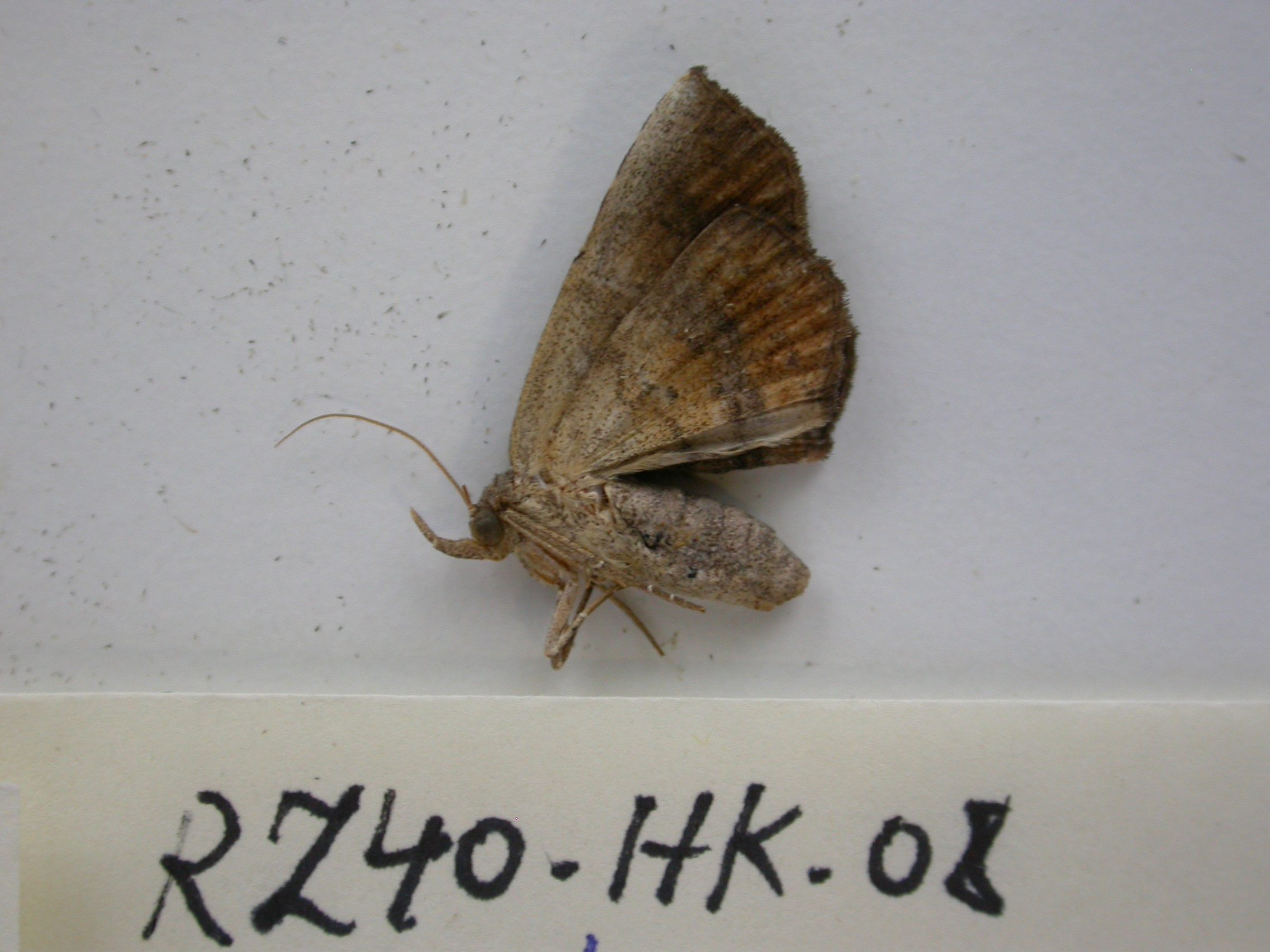

Scientific classification
- Kingdom: Animalia
- Phylum: Arthropoda
- Clade: Pancrustacea
- Class: Insecta
- Order: Lepidoptera
- Superfamily: Noctuoidea
- Family: Erebidae
- Genus: Pangrapta
- Species: P. bicornuta

Binomial name
- Pangrapta bicornuta Galsworthy, 1997

= Pangrapta bicornuta =

Species of moth

Pangrapta bicornuta is a species of moth in the family Erebidae. The species is found in Hong Kong.

== Taxonomy ==
Despite being classified under the subfamily Pangraptinae, analysis of mitochondrial DNA has revealed that Pangrapta bicornuta is polyphyletic with Pangraptinae and is more closely related to Aganainae and Herminiinae than to its own subfamily.
