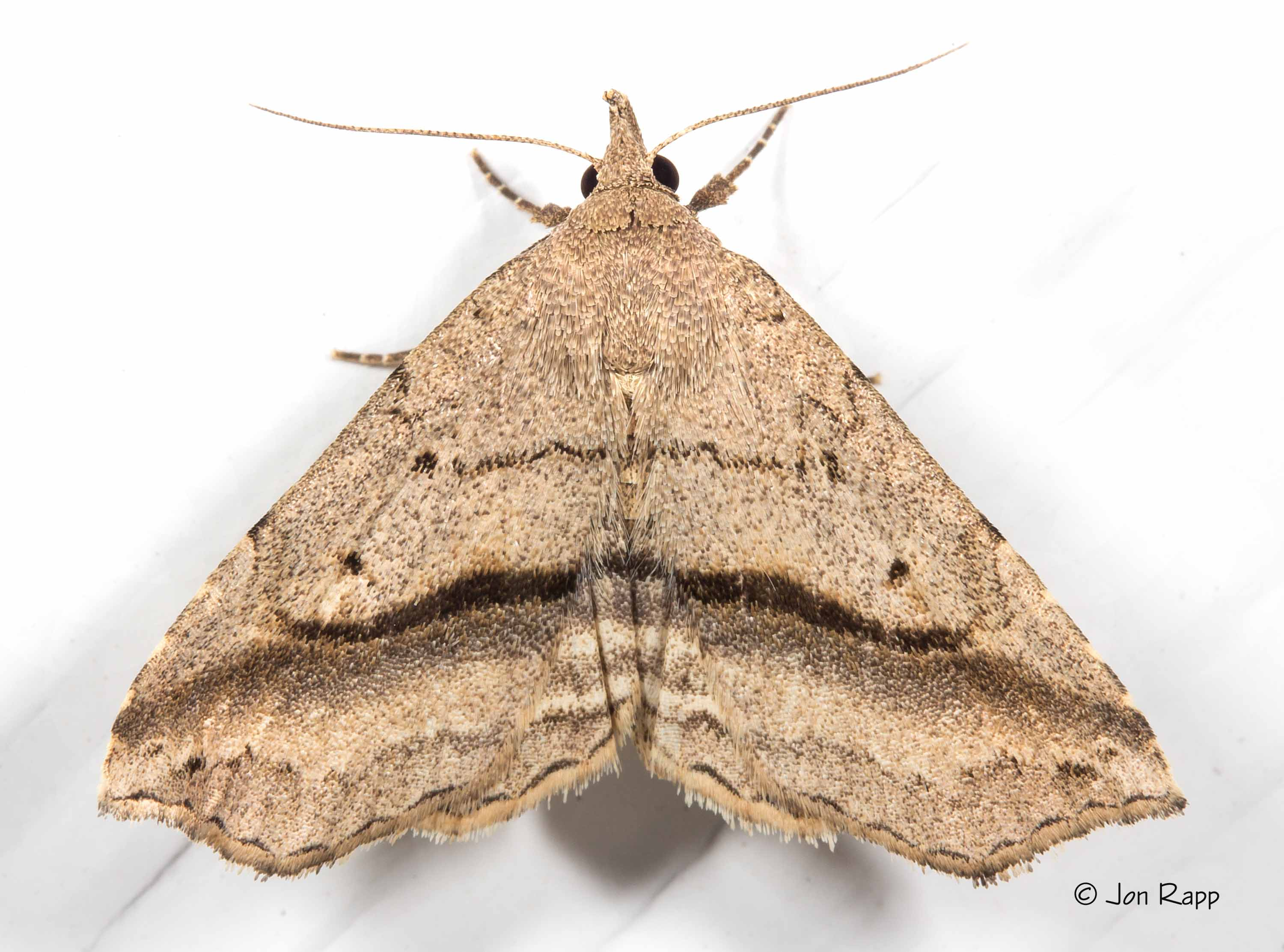

Scientific classification
- Kingdom: Animalia
- Phylum: Arthropoda
- Class: Insecta
- Order: Lepidoptera
- Superfamily: Noctuoidea
- Family: Erebidae
- Genus: Ledaea
- Species: L. perditalis

Binomial name
- Ledaea perditalis (Walker, 1859)

Synonyms
- Ledaea semilineata (Walker, 1865); Ledaea umbrifascia (Grote, 1873)

= Ledaea perditalis =

Species of moth

Ledaea perditalis, the buttonbush owlet or lost owlet moth, is a moth in the family Erebidae. The species was first described by Francis Walker in 1859. It is found in North America from the Great Lakes states, Quebec and northern New England, south to Florida and Texas.

The wingspan is 23–26 mm. Adults are on wing from April to August in the south and from May to August in the north. There are one to three generations per year.

The larvae feed on Cephalanthus species and Scirpus cyperinus.
