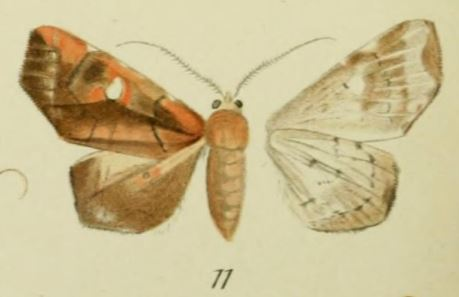

Scientific classification
- Kingdom: Animalia
- Phylum: Arthropoda
- Class: Insecta
- Order: Lepidoptera
- Superfamily: Noctuoidea
- Family: Erebidae
- Genus: Episparis
- Species: E. penetrata

Binomial name
- Episparis penetrata Walker, 1857

Synonyms
- Episparis sublibatrix Bryk, 1915

= Episparis penetrata =

Species of moth

Episparis penetrata is a species of moth in the family Erebidae first described by Francis Walker in 1857.

== Distribution ==
The species is found in Cameroon, the Democratic Republic of the Congo, Equatorial Guinea, Gabon, Nigeria and Sierra Leone.
