= Ledaea =

Scientific classification
- Domain: Eukaryota
- Kingdom: Animalia
- Phylum: Arthropoda
- Class: Insecta
- Order: Lepidoptera
- Superfamily: Noctuoidea
- Family: Erebidae
- Subfamily: Pangraptinae
- Genus: Ledaea; H. Druce in Godman & Salvin, 1891

Synonyms
- Legna Walker, 1865

Genus of moths

Ledaea is a genus of moths in the family Erebidae. The genus was erected by Herbert Druce in 1891.

The Global Lepidoptera Names Index gives this name as a synonym of Spargaloma Grote, 1873.

== Species ==
- Ledaea arciva H. Druce, 1891 Panama
- Ledaea marcella H. Druce, 1891 Costa Rica
- Ledaea perditalis (Walker, [1859]) North America
