= Gerrodes minatea =

Scientific classification
- Kingdom: Animalia
- Phylum: Arthropoda
- Clade: Pancrustacea
- Class: Insecta
- Order: Lepidoptera
- Superfamily: Noctuoidea
- Family: Noctuidae
- Genus: Gerrodes
- Species: G. minatea

Binomial name
- Gerrodes minatea Dyar, 1912

Species of moth

Gerrodes minatea is a species of moth in the family Noctuidae (the owlet moths). It is found in North America.

The MONA or Hodges number for Gerrodes minatea is 9304.
