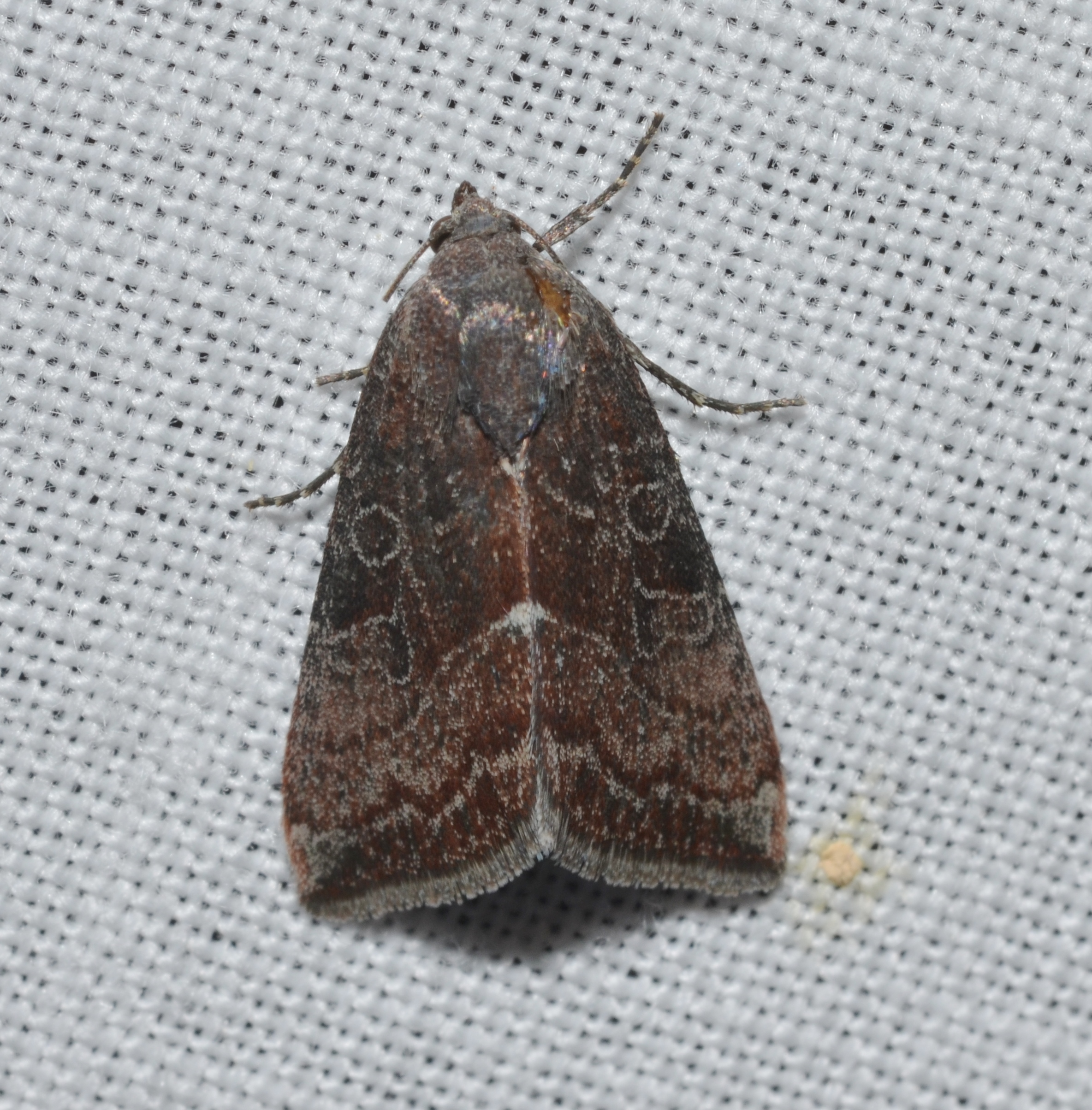

Scientific classification
- Kingdom: Animalia
- Phylum: Arthropoda
- Clade: Pancrustacea
- Class: Insecta
- Order: Lepidoptera
- Superfamily: Noctuoidea
- Family: Noctuidae
- Genus: Galgula
- Species: G. partita

Binomial name
- Galgula partita Guenée, 1852

Synonyms
- Galgula subpartita Guenée, 1852; Galgula hepara Guenée, 1852; Hydrelia ferruginea Walker, 1857; Euclidia externa Walker, 1865; Thalpochares baueri Staudinger, 1870; Thalpochares novarae Felder & Rogenhofer, 1874; Telesilla vesca Morrison, 1875; Galgula sorex Möschler, 1886; Thalpochares bias Druce, 1889; Thalpochares hippotamada Druce, 1889; Rivula mandane Druce, 1891; Galgula interna Barnes & McDunnough, 1917

= Galgula partita =

Species of moth

The Wedgling Moth (Galgula partita) is a moth of the family Noctuidae. It is found from most of North America south to Guatemala and the Caribbean. It is also present on the Azores, Madeira and the Canary Islands.

The wingspan is 20–26 mm. They are on wing from March to November in the southern part of the range and from May to September in the north. There are several generations per year.

The larvae feed on Oxalis species.
