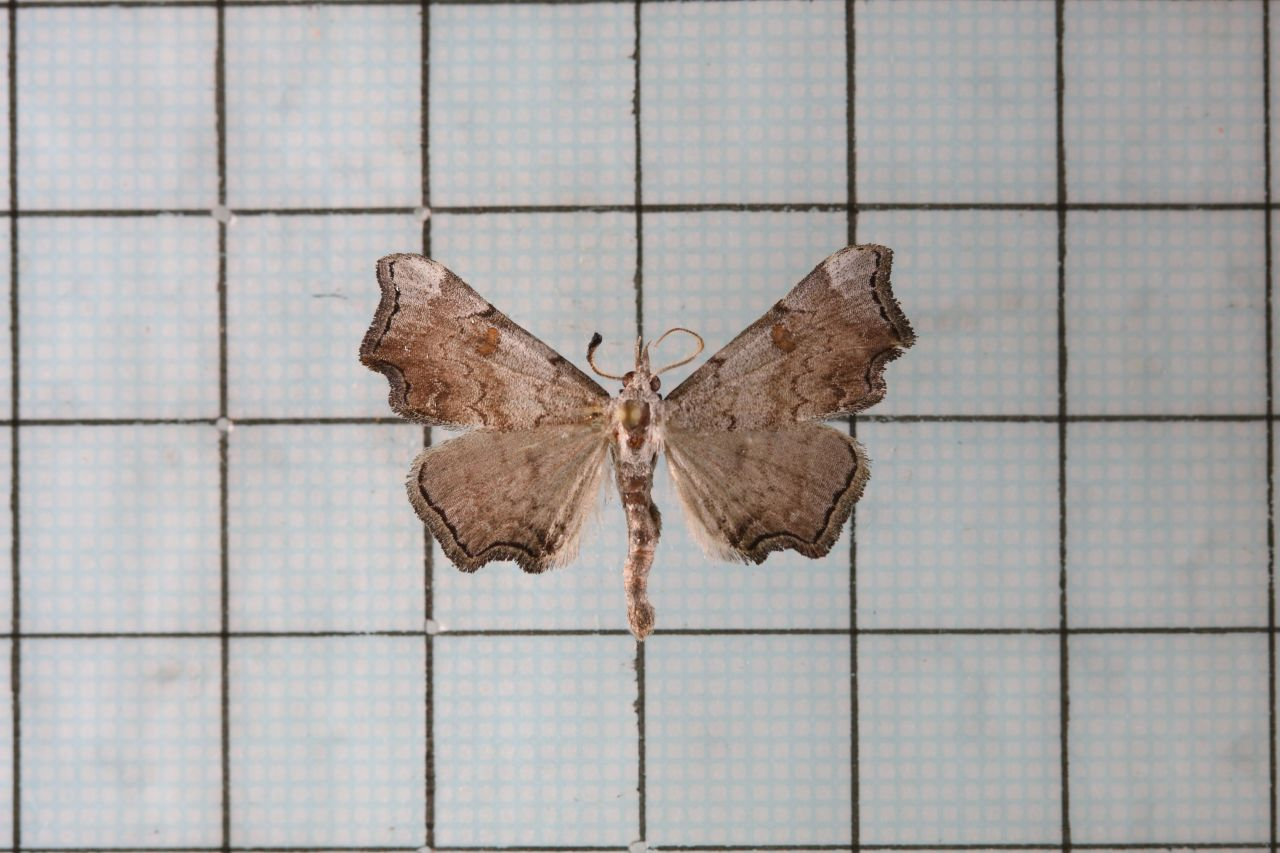

Scientific classification
- Kingdom: Animalia
- Phylum: Arthropoda
- Clade: Pancrustacea
- Class: Insecta
- Order: Lepidoptera
- Superfamily: Noctuoidea
- Family: Erebidae
- Subfamily: Pangraptinae
- Genus: Pangrapta; Hübner, 1818

Synonyms
- Marmorinia Guenée, 1852; Saraca Walker, [1866]; Stenozethes Hampson, 1926

= Pangrapta =

Genus of moths

Pangrapta is a genus of moths in the family Erebidae. The genus was first described by Jacob Hübner in 1818.

== Species ==
- Pangrapta acolesis Viette, 1958 Madagascar
- Pangrapta adoxopis (Turner, 1908) northern Queensland
- Pangrapta adusta (Leech, 1900)
- Pangrapta albipuncta Gaede, 1940 Cameroon
- Pangrapta albirenalis Gaede, 1940 Malawi
- Pangrapta albiseriata Hampson, 1926 Borneo
- Pangrapta albistigma (Hampson, 1898) India (Meghalaya)
- Pangrapta argyrographa (Mabille, 1893) Madagascar
- Pangrapta aroa Bethune-Baker, 1906 New Guinea
- Pangrapta athemonalis (Walker, [1859]) Borneo
- Pangrapta aviusalis (Walker, [1859]) Borneo
- Pangrapta camerunia Hampson, 1926 Cameroon
- Pangrapta cana (Leech, 1900)
- Pangrapta chilana (Swinhoe, 1902) Borneo
- Pangrapta cinerea (Butler, 1889) India (Himachal Pradesh)
- Pangrapta costaemacula Staudinger, 1888 south-eastern Siberia
- Pangrapta costinotata (Butler, 1881) Japan
- Pangrapta cryptoleuca Hampson, 1926 New Guinea
- Pangrapta curtalis (Walker, [1866]) Shanghai
- Pangrapta decoralis Hübner, 1818 Nova Scotia, New York, Georgia, Florida
- Pangrapta dentilineata (Leech, 1900) western China
- Pangrapta dialitha Hampson, 1926 Borneo
- Pangrapta disruptalis (Walker, [1866]) Shanghai
- Pangrapta dulcis Berio, 1956 Zaire
- Pangrapta elassa Hampson, 1926 Ghana
- Pangrapta enigmaria (Swinhoe, 1905) India (Meghalaya)
- Pangrapta eucraspeda Hampson, 1926 Cameroon
- Pangrapta fauvealis Viette, 1965 Madagascar
- Pangrapta ferrugineiceps (Hampson, 1896) Bhutan
- Pangrapta flavomacula Staudinger, 1888 south-eastern Siberia
- Pangrapta franeyae Viette, 1979 Madagascar
- Pangrapta grisangula (Hampson, 1891) India (Tamil Nadu)
- Pangrapta griseola Staudinger, 1892 south-eastern Siberia
- Pangrapta hampsoni Viette, 1966 Madagascar
- Pangrapta holophaea Hampson, 1926 Singapore
- Pangrapta hylaxalis (Walker, [1859]) Borneo, Nias
- Pangrapta hyriona (Hampson, 1926) Borneo
- Pangrapta indentalis (Leech, 1889) Japan
- Pangrapta ingratata (Leech, 1900) western China
- Pangrapta laevis Berio, 1956 Zaire
- Pangrapta loricalis Geyer, 1837
- Pangrapta lunulata Seitz, 1915 south-eastern Siberia
- Pangrapta macariana Hampson, 1926 Singapore
- Pangrapta mandarina (Leech, 1900)
- Pangrapta marmorata Staudinger, 1888 south-eastern Siberia
- Pangrapta melacleptra Hampson, 1926 Mozambique
- Pangrapta mesacta Hampson, 1926 Bhutan
- Pangrapta metagona (Walker, 1864) Borneo
- Pangrapta minor Sugi, 1982 Japan
- Pangrapta molybdina Hampson, 1926 India (Meghalaya)
- Pangrapta nigra (Bethune-Baker, 1906) New Guinea
- Pangrapta obscurata (Butler, 1879) Japan
- Pangrapta ornata (Leech, 1900)
- Pangrapta pannosa (Moore, 1882) India (Meghalaya, West Bengal)
- Pangrapta parsimonalis (Walker, [1859]) Borneo
- Pangrapta parvula (Leech, 1900)
- Pangrapta pelidna Hampson, 1926 China (Hupeh)
- Pangrapta pensilis Felder & Rogenhofer, 1874 Japan
- Pangrapta perturbans (Walker, 1858) Bangladesh
- Pangrapta pexifera Hampson, 1926 Madagascar
- Pangrapta pictipennis (Hampson, 1895) Trivandrum
- Pangrapta plumbilineata Wileman & West, 1929 Taiwan
- Pangrapta porphyrea (Butler, 1879) Japan
- Pangrapta pratti Bethune-Baker, 1906 New Guinea
- Pangrapta pulverea (Leech, 1900)
- Pangrapta rufia Schaus, 1894 Brazil (Rio de Janeiro)
- Pangrapta saucia (Leech, 1900)
- Pangrapta seriopuncta Hampson, 1926 Sierra Leone
- Pangrapta shivula (Guenée, 1852) Bangladesh
- Pangrapta similistigma Warren, 1913
- Pangrapta sphragis Möschler, 1880 Suriname
- Pangrapta squamea (Leech, 1900)
- Pangrapta suaveola Staudinger, 1888 south-eastern Siberia
- Pangrapta taenaria Möschler, 1880 Suriname
- Pangrapta talusalis (Walker, [1859]) India
- Pangrapta textilis (Leech, 1889) Korea
- Pangrapta thetys Felder & Rogenhofer, 1874 Brazil (Amazonas)
- Pangrapta tipula (Swinhoe, 1893) Shan States
- Pangrapta transducta Hampson, 1926 Myanmar
- Pangrapta trilineata (Leech, 1900)
- Pangrapta trimatesalis (Walker, [1859]) Bangladesh
- Pangrapta umrosa Leech, 1900
- Pangrapta vaga (Walker, 1865) Bangladesh
- Pangrapta variegata Rothschild, 1920 Sumatra
- Pangrapta vasava (Butler, 1881) south-eastern Siberia, Japan
- Pangrapta yoshinensis Wileman & West, 1929 Japan
- Pangrapta bicornuta Galsworthy, 1997 Hong Kong
