= Chamyla =

Scientific classification
- Kingdom: Animalia
- Phylum: Arthropoda
- Clade: Pancrustacea
- Class: Insecta
- Order: Lepidoptera
- Superfamily: Noctuoidea
- Family: Noctuidae
- Genus: Isochlora
- Subgenus: Chamyla; Staudinger, 1899

Subgenus of moths

Chamyla is a subgenus of moths of the genus Isochlora of the family Noctuidae.
