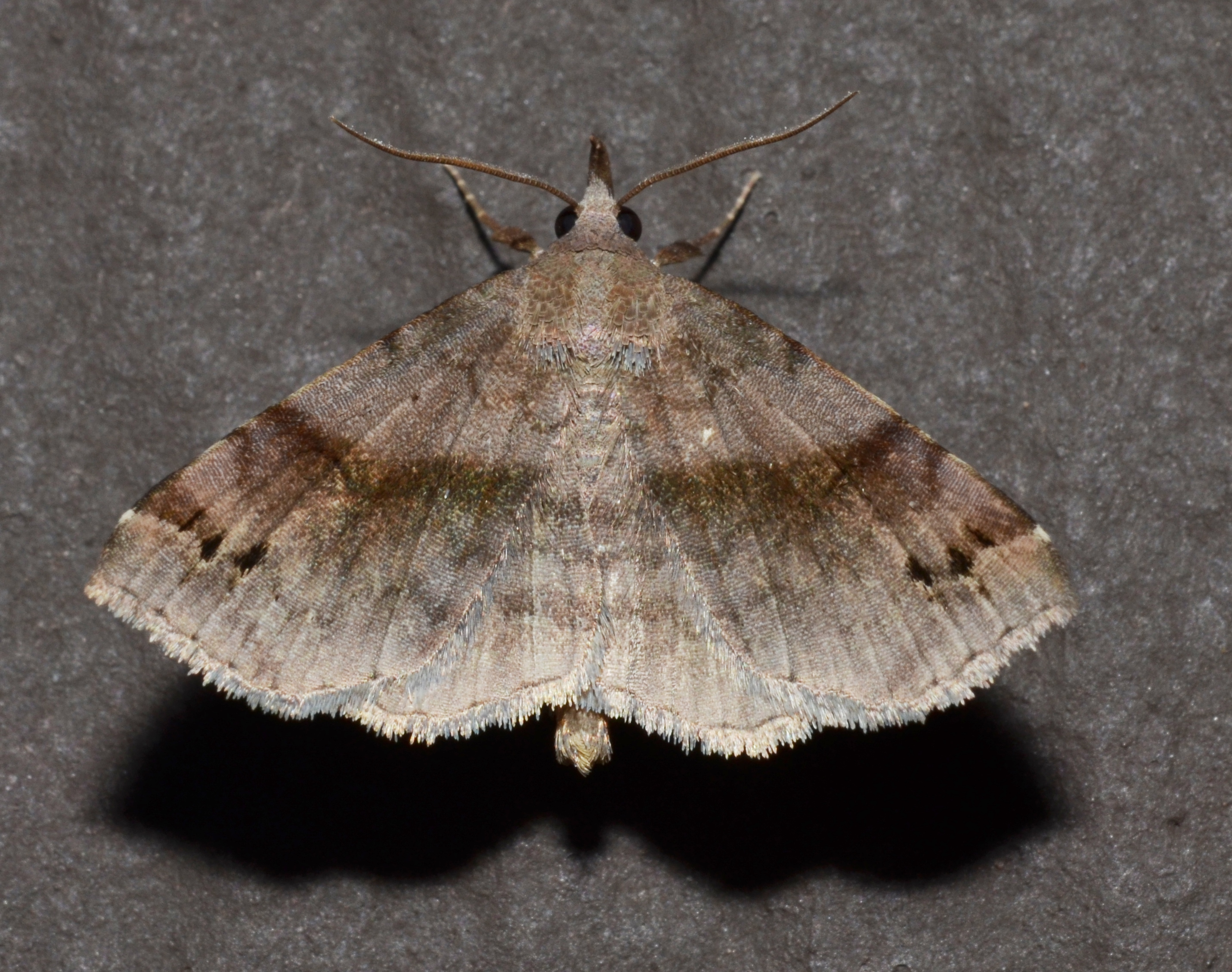

Scientific classification
- Domain: Eukaryota
- Kingdom: Animalia
- Phylum: Arthropoda
- Class: Insecta
- Order: Lepidoptera
- Superfamily: Noctuoidea
- Family: Erebidae
- Genus: Spargaloma; Grote, 1873
- Species: S. sexpunctata

Binomial name
- Spargaloma sexpunctata Grote, 1873

Synonyms
- Ledaea H. Druce, 1891

= Spargaloma =

Genus of moths

Spargaloma is a monotypic moth genus in the family Erebidae. Its only species is Spargaloma sexpunctata, the six-spotted gray. Both the genus and species were first described by Augustus Radcliffe Grote in 1873. It is found from coast to coast in lower Canada south in the east to Florida, Mississippi and Arkansas, in the west to California.

The wingspan is 25–29 mm. Adults are on wing from May to September.
