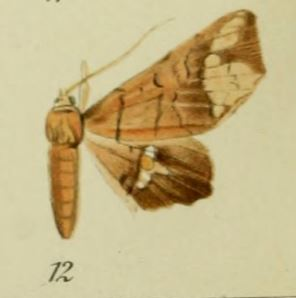

Scientific classification
- Kingdom: Animalia
- Phylum: Arthropoda
- Class: Insecta
- Order: Lepidoptera
- Superfamily: Noctuoidea
- Family: Erebidae
- Genus: Episparis
- Species: E. fenestrifera

Binomial name
- Episparis fenestrifera Bryk, 1915

Synonyms
- Episparis pyrocausta Hampson, 1926

= Episparis fenestrifera =

Species of moth

Episparis fenestrifera is a species of moth in the family Erebidae first described by Felix Bryk in 1915.

== Distribution ==
The species is found in Cameroon, Nigeria and Sierra Leone.
