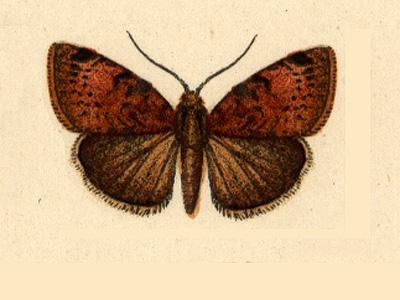

Scientific classification
- Domain: Eukaryota
- Kingdom: Animalia
- Phylum: Arthropoda
- Class: Insecta
- Order: Lepidoptera
- Superfamily: Noctuoidea
- Family: Noctuidae
- Genus: Galgula
- Species: G. subapicalis

Binomial name
- Galgula subapicalis Hampson, 1909

Synonyms
- Calgula subapicalis

= Galgula subapicalis =

Species of moth

Galgula subapicalis is a moth of the family Noctuidae. It is found on Jamaica.
