= Episparis varialis =

Scientific classification
- Kingdom: Animalia
- Phylum: Arthropoda
- Class: Insecta
- Order: Lepidoptera
- Superfamily: Noctuoidea
- Family: Erebidae
- Genus: Episparis
- Species: E. varialis

Binomial name
- Episparis varialis Walker, 1859

Synonyms
- Neviasca variabilis Walker, 1859

Species of moth

Episparis varialis is a moth of the family Erebidae first described by Francis Walker in 1859. It is found in India and Sri Lanka. The binomial name is sometimes classified as a junior objective synonym of Phalaena liturata.
