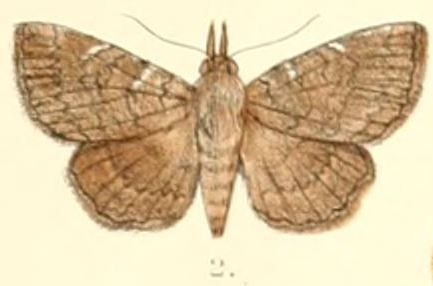

Scientific classification
- Kingdom: Animalia
- Phylum: Arthropoda
- Class: Insecta
- Order: Lepidoptera
- Superfamily: Noctuoidea
- Family: Erebidae
- Genus: Hyposemansis
- Species: H. singha

Binomial name
- Hyposemansis singha (Guenée, 1852)

Synonyms
- Marmorinia singha Guenée, 1852; Zethes amynoides Moore, 1882; Hyposemansis singha magnipunctata Prout, 1928; Mecodina subornata Wileman, 1914

= Hyposemansis singha =

Species of moth

Hyposemansis singha is a species of moth in the family Erebidae first described by Achille Guenée in 1852. It is found in the Himalayas, Taiwan, Myanmar and on Borneo and Sumatra. The habitat consists of forests, ranging from the lowlands to elevations of about 1,760 meters, but is mostly found in lowland dipterocarp forests.

== Subspecies ==
- Hyposemansis singha singha
- Hyposemansis singha magnipunctata Prout, 1928 (Sumatra)
