= Gonodes trapezoides =

Scientific classification
- Kingdom: Animalia
- Phylum: Arthropoda
- Class: Insecta
- Order: Lepidoptera
- Superfamily: Noctuoidea
- Family: Noctuidae
- Genus: Gonodes
- Species: G. trapezoides

Binomial name
- Gonodes trapezoides (Herrich-Schäffer, 1868)

Synonyms
- Celaeno trapezoides Herrich-Schäffer, 1868

Species of moth

Gonodes trapezoides is a moth of the family Noctuidae first described by Gottlieb August Wilhelm Herrich-Schäffer in 1868. It is found on Cuba.

== Taxonomy ==
The species was incorrectly synonymized with Elaphria subobliqua for some time.
