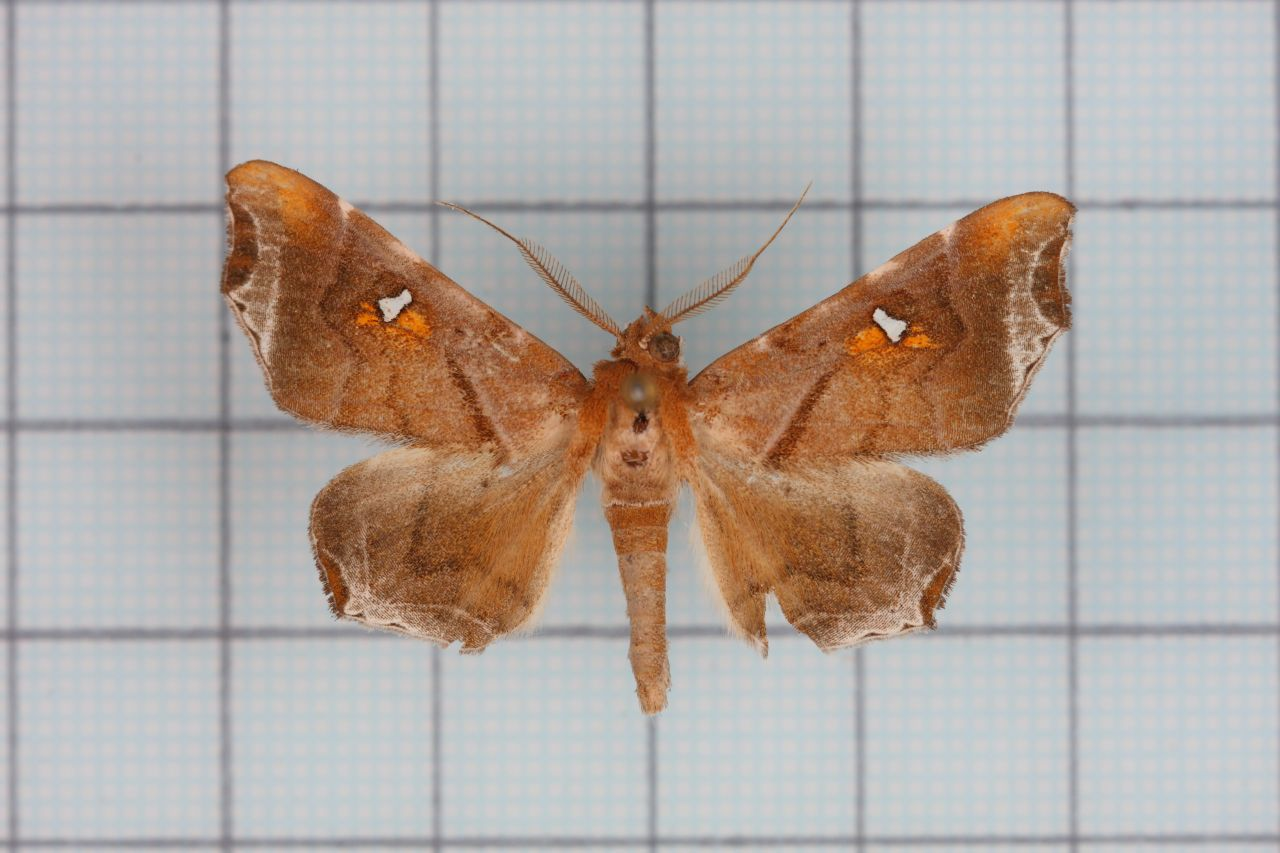
- Episparis taiwana.

Scientific classification
- Kingdom: Animalia
- Phylum: Arthropoda
- Class: Insecta
- Order: Lepidoptera
- Superfamily: Noctuoidea
- Family: Erebidae
- Subfamily: Pangraptinae; Grote, 1882

= Pangraptinae =

Subfamily of moths

The Pangraptinae are a subfamily of moths in the family Erebidae.

== Taxonomy ==
Phylogenetic analysis only weakly supports the subfamily as a clade but determines that the clade containing the Aganainae, Herminiinae (litter moths), and Arctiinae (tiger and lichen moths) is most closely related. The Pangraptinae may be significantly revised after further study.

== Genera ==
- Episparis
- Gracilodes
- Hyposemansis
- Ledaea
- Masca
- Pangrapta
