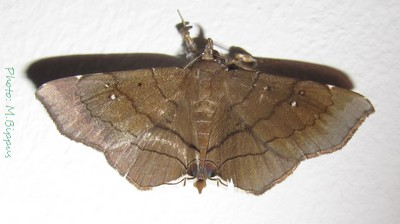

Scientific classification
- Kingdom: Animalia
- Phylum: Arthropoda
- Clade: Pancrustacea
- Class: Insecta
- Order: Lepidoptera
- Superfamily: Noctuoidea
- Family: Erebidae
- Genus: Gracilodes
- Species: G. nysa

Binomial name
- Gracilodes nysa Guenée, 1852

= Gracilodes nysa =

Species of moth

Gracilodes nysa is a species of moth in the family Erebidae. The species is found in Africa, from Uganda and Kenya to South Africa and on the islands of the Indian Ocean, in Mauritius, Réunion, Madagascar, Seychelles and Comores.

Adults have a dark brown colour and a wingspan of approx. 45 mm.

One of the hostplants of its caterpillars is Vangueria madagascariensis, a Rubiaceae.
