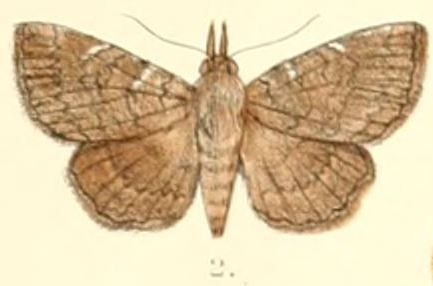
- Hyposemansis singha

Scientific classification
- Kingdom: Animalia
- Phylum: Arthropoda
- Class: Insecta
- Order: Lepidoptera
- Superfamily: Noctuoidea
- Family: Erebidae
- Subfamily: Pangraptinae
- Genus: Hyposemansis; Hampson, 1895

= Hyposemansis =

Genus of moths

Hyposemansis is a genus of moths in the family Erebidae. The genus was erected by George Hampson in 1895.

== Species ==
- Hyposemansis albipuncta (Wileman, 1914) Taiwan
- Hyposemansis asbolaea (Lower, 1903) Queensland
- Hyposemansis cryptosema Hampson, 1926 New Guinea
- Hyposemansis lasiophora Hampson, 1926 Borneo
- Hyposemansis mediopallens Wileman & West, 1929 Philippines (Luzon)
- Hyposemansis singha (Guenée, 1852) Calcutta, Silhet, Taiwan, Sumatra
- Hyposemansis volvapex Kobes, 1994
