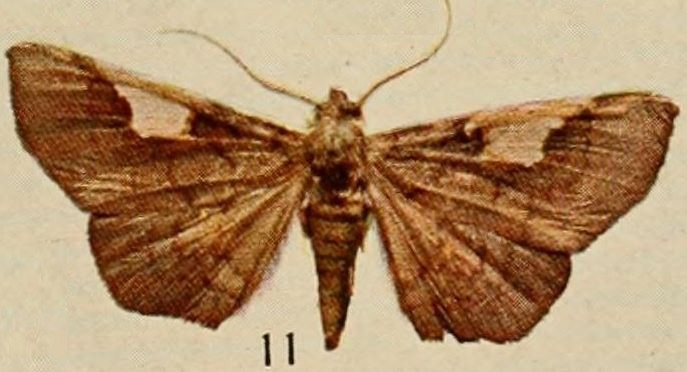

Scientific classification
- Domain: Eukaryota
- Kingdom: Animalia
- Phylum: Arthropoda
- Class: Insecta
- Order: Lepidoptera
- Superfamily: Noctuoidea
- Family: Erebidae
- Genus: Episparis
- Species: E. hyalinata

Binomial name
- Episparis hyalinata (Holland, 1920)

Synonyms
- Emphigonia hyalinata Holland, 1920

= Episparis hyalinata =

Species of moth

Episparis hyalinata is a species of moth in the family Erebidae.

== Distribution ==
The species is found in Democratic Republic of Congo
