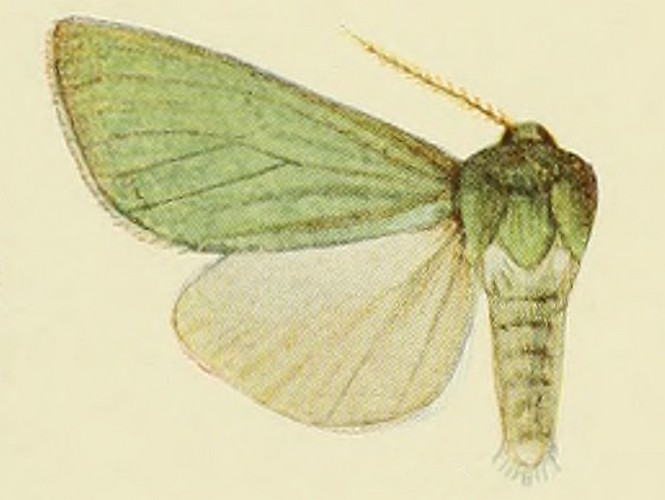
- Isochlora chloroptera

Scientific classification
- Domain: Eukaryota
- Kingdom: Animalia
- Phylum: Arthropoda
- Class: Insecta
- Order: Lepidoptera
- Superfamily: Noctuoidea
- Family: Noctuidae
- Subfamily: Noctuinae
- Genus: Isochlora; Staudinger, 1882

= Isochlora =

Genus of moths

Isochlora is a genus of moths of the family Noctuidae.

== Species ==
- Subgenus Chamyla Staudinger, 1899
  - Isochlora affinis Draudt, 1935
  - Isochlora arctomys Alphéraky, 1892
  - Isochlora atra Hreblay & Gyulai, 1998
  - Isochlora glaciale Boursin, 1940
  - Isochlora intricans Alphéraky, 1892
  - Isochlora metaleuca Ronkay & Gyulai, 1998
  - Isochlora mirabilis Gyulai & Ronkay, 2006
  - Isochlora paulusi Gyulai, Ronkay & Huber, 2001
  - Isochlora salki Gyulai & Ronkay, 1998
  - Isochlora sericea Lafontaine & Kononenko, 1996
  - Isochlora vecors Püngeler, 1904
  - Isochlora zoeldice Gyulai & Ronkay, 2001
- Subgenus Grumia Alphéraky, 1899
  - Isochlora cardinalis Gyulai & Ronkay, 2001
  - Isochlora carriei Boursin, 1963
  - Isochlora flora Alphéraky, 1892
  - Isochlora krausei Boursin, 1963
  - Isochlora microviridis Gyulai & Ronkay, 2001
- Subgenus Isochlora Staudinger, 1882
  - Isochlora chloroptera Hampson, 1894
  - Isochlora dagestana Hreblay & Ronkay, 1998
  - Isochlora eti Gyulai & Ronkay, 2001
  - Isochlora goliath Hreblay & Plante, 1998
  - Isochlora grumi Alphéraky, 1892
  - Isochlora herbacea Alphéraky, 1895
  - Isochlora leuconeura Püngeler, 1904
  - Isochlora metaphaea Hampson, 1906
  - Isochlora minima Hreblay & Ronkay, 1998
  - Isochlora obscura Chen, 1995
  - Isochlora ochrea Gyulai & Ronkay, 2001
  - Isochlora ochreicosta Gyulai & Ronkay, 2006
  - Isochlora ossicolor Hreblay & Plante, 1998
  - Isochlora pseudossicolor Gyulai & Ronkay, 2001
  - Isochlora rubicosta Chen, 1982
  - Isochlora straminea Leech, 1900
  - Isochlora viridis Staudinger, 1882
  - Isochlora viridissima Staudinger, 1882
  - Isochlora xanthiana Staudinger, 1895
  - Isochlora xanthisma Chen, 1993
  - Isochlora yushuensis Chen, 1993
