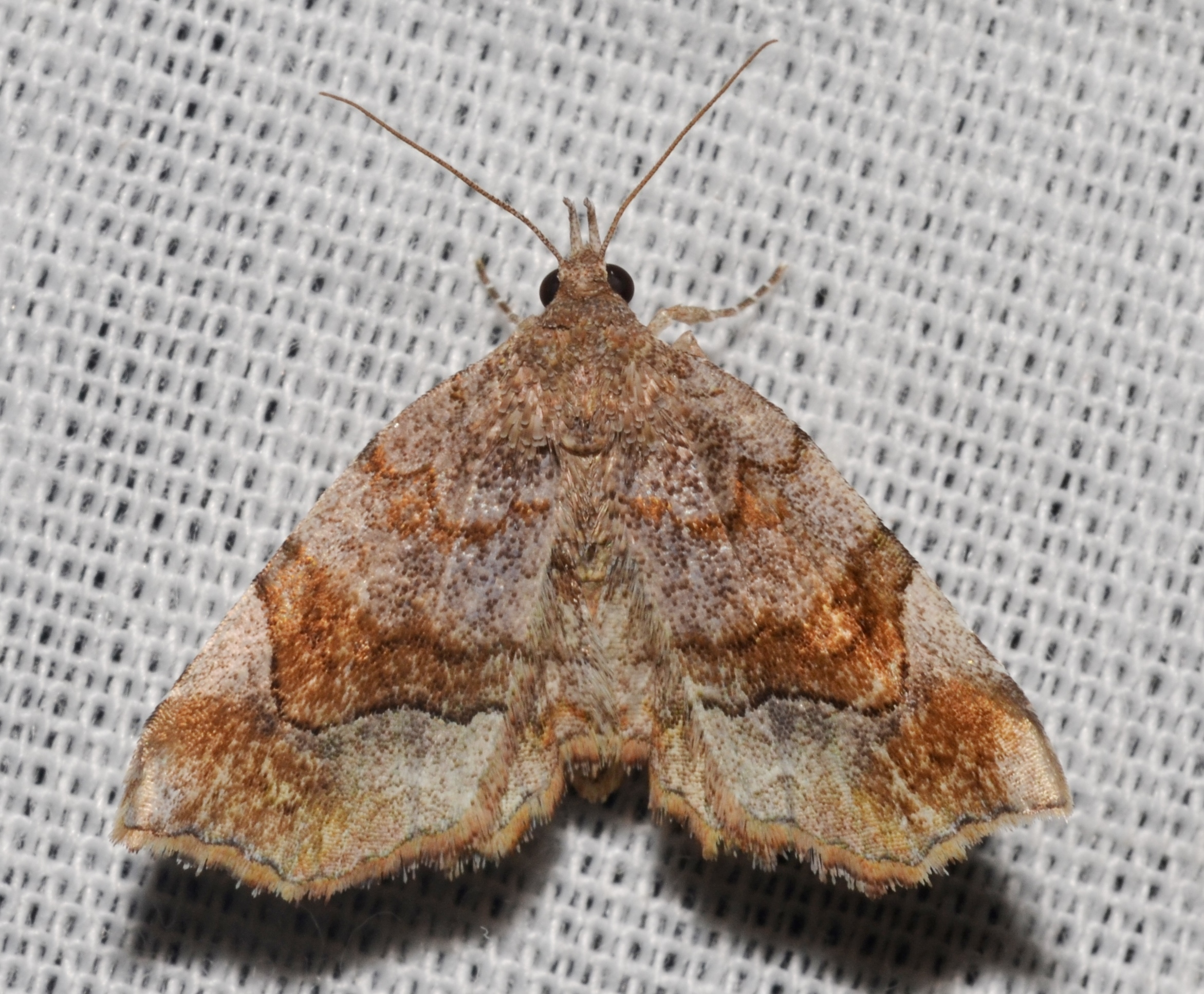

Scientific classification
- Kingdom: Animalia
- Phylum: Arthropoda
- Class: Insecta
- Order: Lepidoptera
- Superfamily: Noctuoidea
- Family: Erebidae
- Genus: Pangrapta
- Species: P. decoralis

Binomial name
- Pangrapta decoralis Hübner, 1818

Synonyms
- Marmorinia epionoides Guenée, 1852; Marmorinia geometroides Guenée, 1852; Hypena elegantalis Fitch, 1856; Thyridospila recusans Walker, 1866

= Pangrapta decoralis =

Species of moth

Pangrapta decoralis, the decorated owlet, is a moth in the family Erebidae. The species was first described by Jacob Hübner in 1818. It is found in North America from Alberta to Nova Scotia south to Florida and Texas.

The wingspan is 20–28 mm. Adults are on wing from May to September. There are two to three generations per year.

The larvae feed on Vaccinium species.
