= Gonodes liquida =

Scientific classification
- Domain: Eukaryota
- Kingdom: Animalia
- Phylum: Arthropoda
- Class: Insecta
- Order: Lepidoptera
- Superfamily: Noctuoidea
- Family: Noctuidae
- Genus: Gonodes
- Species: G. liquida

Binomial name
- Gonodes liquida (Möschler, 1886)

Synonyms
- Ipimorpha liquida Moschler, 1886; Drobeta leada Druce, 1898; Cyatissa violascens Schaus, 1894

Species of moth

Gonodes liquida is a moth of the family Noctuidae first described by Heinrich Benno Möschler in 1886. It is found from the southern United States (Florida) through St. Kitts, Cuba and Jamaica to the north of South America (Peru, Venezuela and French Guiana).
