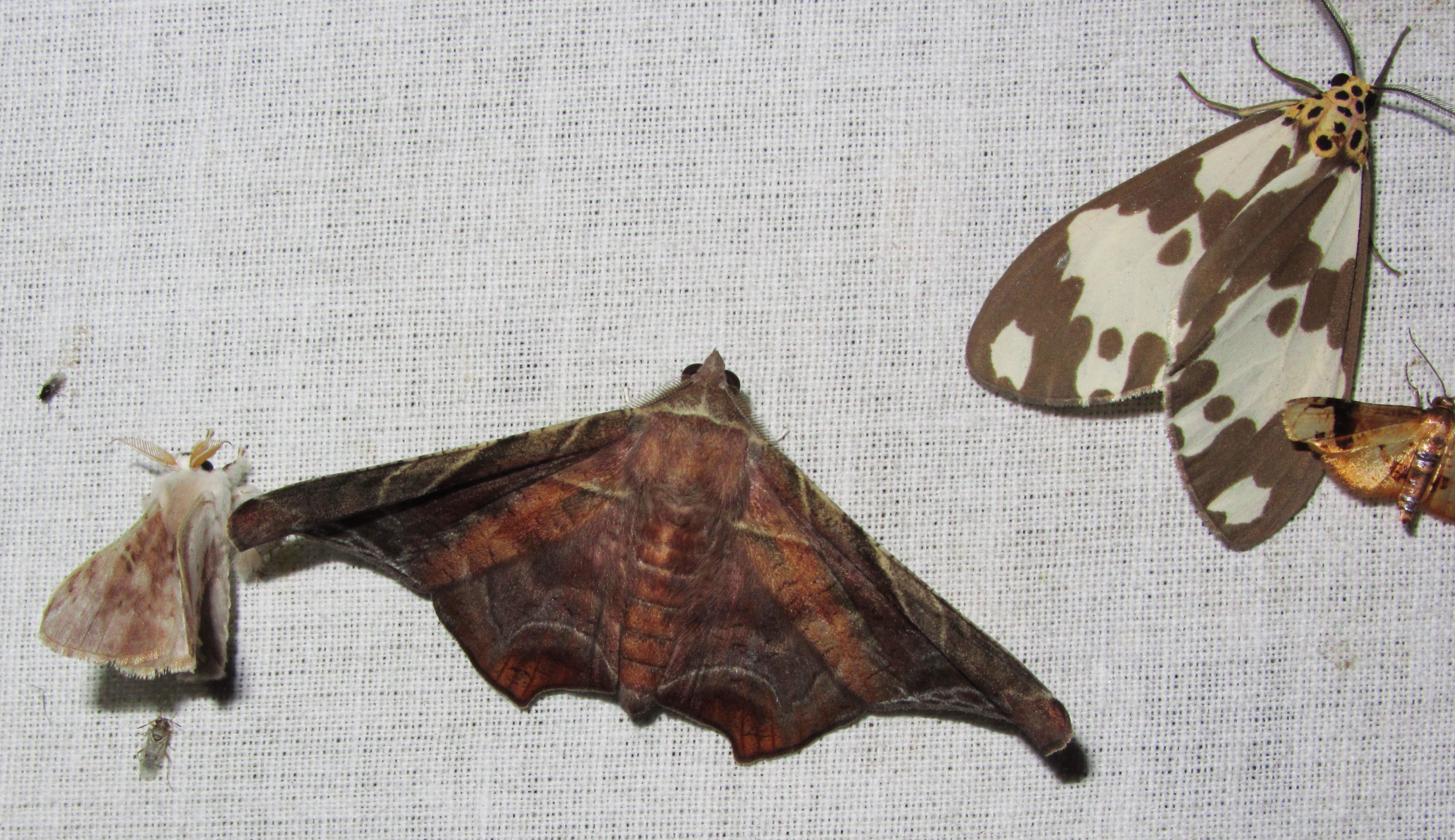

Scientific classification
- Kingdom: Animalia
- Phylum: Arthropoda
- Clade: Pancrustacea
- Class: Insecta
- Order: Lepidoptera
- Superfamily: Noctuoidea
- Family: Erebidae
- Genus: Episparis
- Species: E. tortuosalis

Binomial name
- Episparis tortuosalis Moore, 1867

= Episparis tortuosalis =

Species of moth

Episparis tortuosalis is a moth of the family Noctuidae first described by Frederic Moore in 1867. It is found in Sri Lanka, Thailand, Laos, Cambodia, Vietnam, Nepal, northern India and China. Caterpillars are known to feed on Chukrasia tabularis and Michelia champaca.
