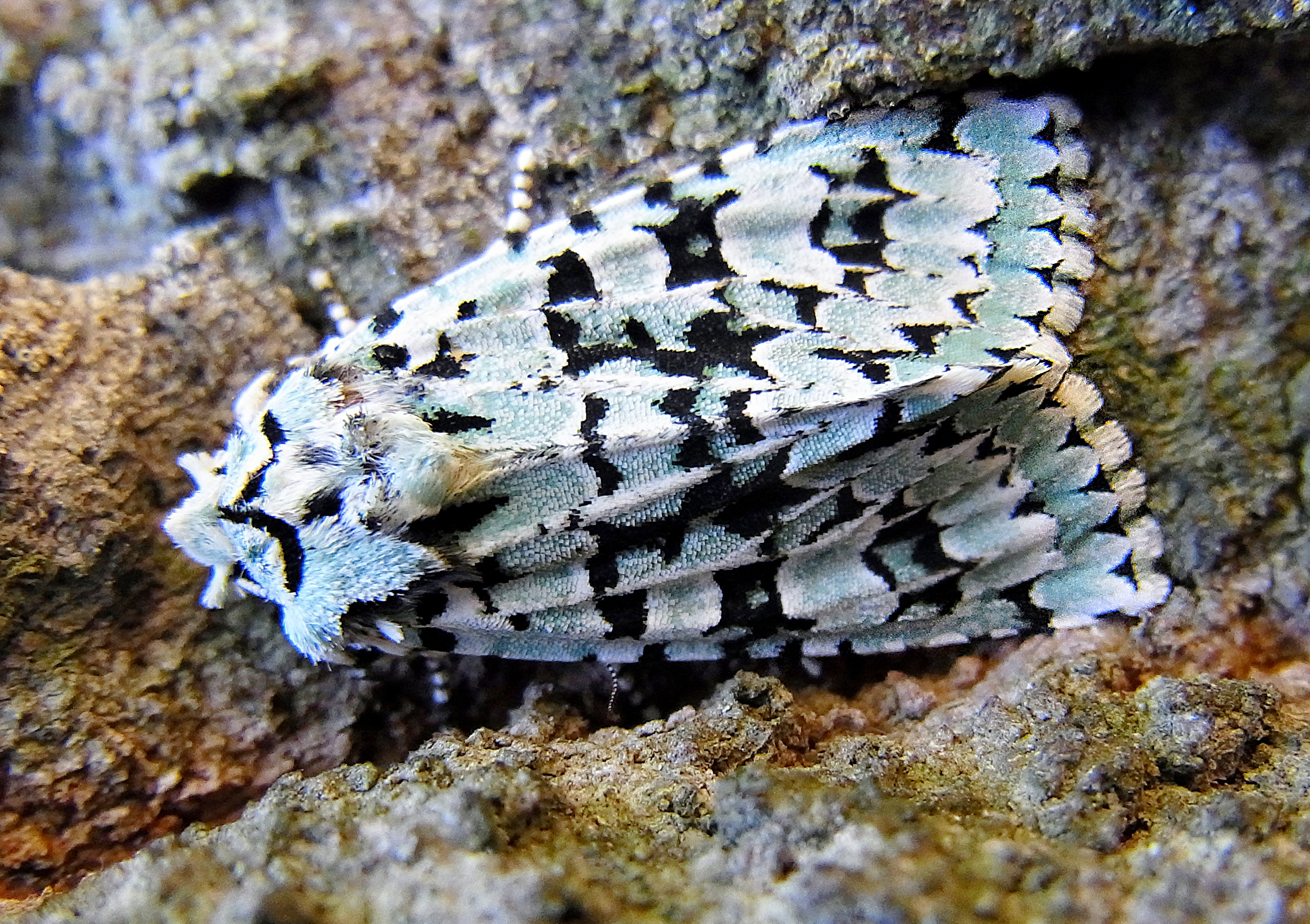

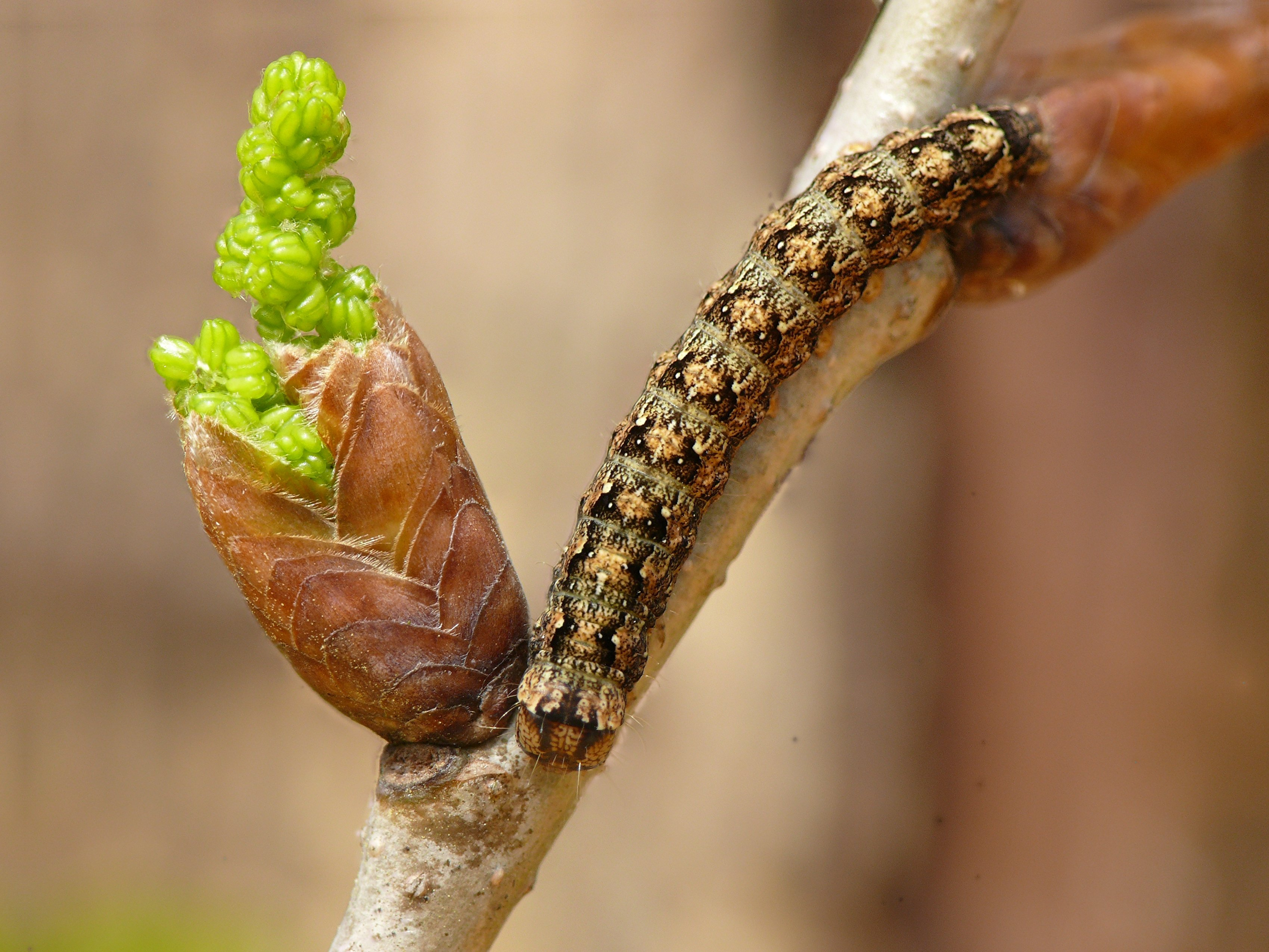

Scientific classification
- Kingdom: Animalia
- Phylum: Arthropoda
- Class: Insecta
- Order: Lepidoptera
- Superfamily: Noctuoidea
- Family: Noctuidae
- Genus: Griposia
- Species: G. aprilina

Binomial name
- Griposia aprilina (Linnaeus, 1758)

Synonyms
- List: Phalaena (Noctua) aprilina Linnaeus, 1758 Noctua runica Denis & Schiffermüller, 1775 Agriopis aprilina (Linnaeus, 1758) Dichonia aprilina (Linnaeus, 1758) Dichonia aprilinea var. bouveti Lucas, 1905 Dichonia aprilinea f. xantha Schawerda, 1909 Dichonia aprilina obscurior Wolfsberger, 1970

= Griposia aprilina =

Merveille du jour

Species of moth

Griposia aprilina, also known as the merveille du jour, is a moth of the family Noctuidae, found in Asia and Europe. The species was first described by the Swedish taxonomist Carl Linnaeus in his 1758 10th edition of Systema Naturae.

== Technical description and variation ==
Forewing whitish green; lines and markings velvety black, the median shade especially thick; upper stigmata large; all the black markings emphasised by white; hindwing blackish grey; the cellspot, outer line, and submarginal shade darker; a white terminal space before the black marginal line; the ab. bouveti Lucas, from France, has the head, thorax, and forewings greener, the median area of forewing without black markings.

== Similar species ==
- Griposia pinkeri (Kobes, 1973) is found sympatrically in Asia Minor and on the Balkan Peninsula.

== Biology ==
The moth flies in September and October and comes to light.

Ovum

Eggs are laid singly or in small numbers on branches, or in crevices in the bark of oak trees (Quercus species).

Larva

The eggs hatch as the buds swell and the young larva bore into a bud which conceals them as they feed. They then feed on the flowers and grow rapidly and finally on the leaves. Larvae are greenish black, with a fulvous tinge; a dorsal series of dark medallions; dorsal line pale, interrupted, with black edges; spiracular line pale like the venter.

Pupa

In a large, tough cocoon, near the soil surface and usually among the roots of an oak.

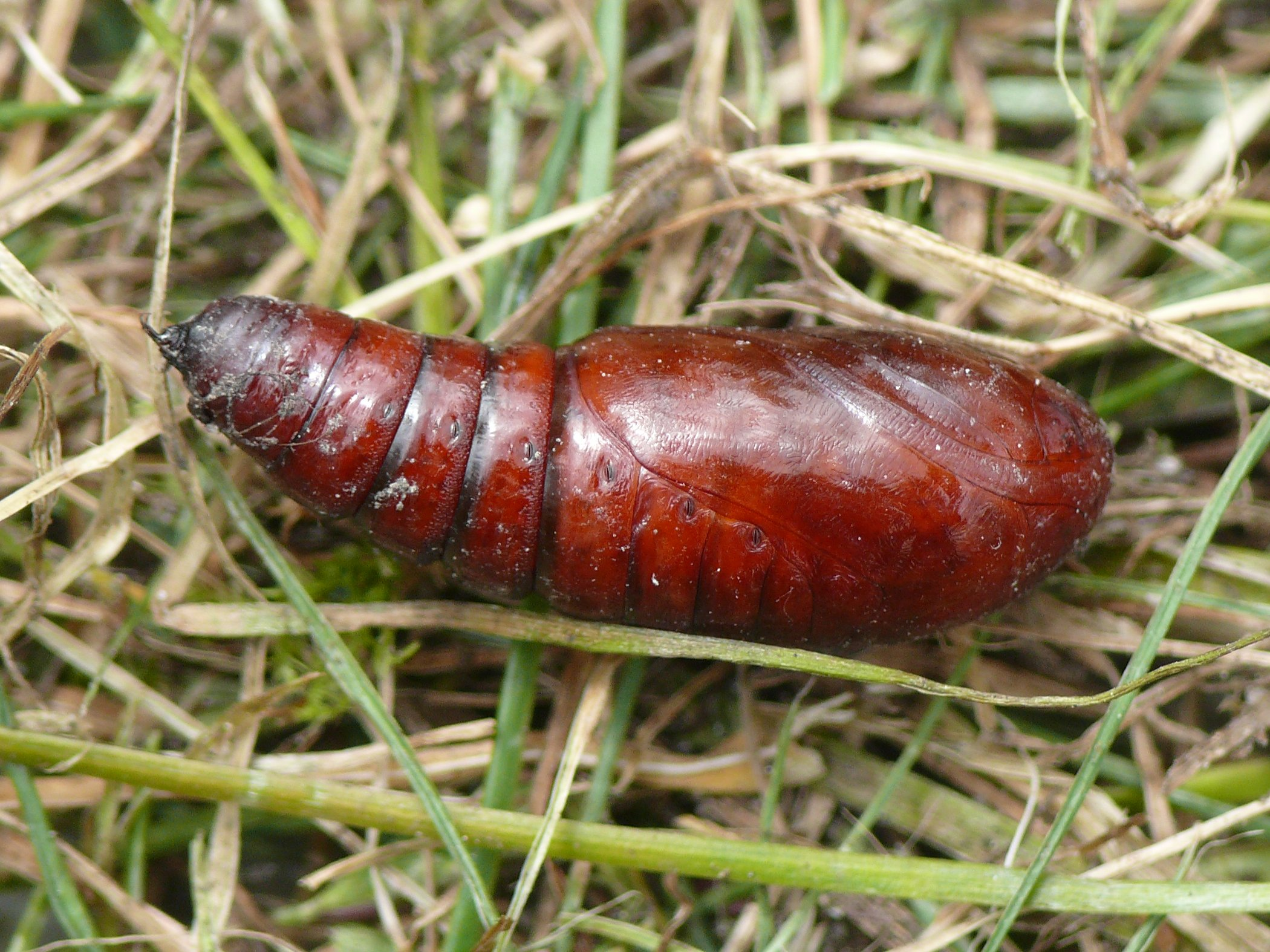
Pupa

== Distribution ==
It ranges from Sardinia and south-east Russia (foothills of the Ural Mountains to the Black Sea) from the southernmost part of Norway and Saint Petersburg through northern and central Europe to southern France and northern Italy, as well as in Castile. Also in western and central Anatolia and the Caucasus. Also in Asia minor. There is recent evidence from the Alborz mountain range.
