= Goniocraspedon mistura =

Scientific classification
- Kingdom: Animalia
- Phylum: Arthropoda
- Clade: Pancrustacea
- Class: Insecta
- Order: Lepidoptera
- Superfamily: Noctuoidea
- Family: Erebidae
- Genus: Goniocraspedon
- Species: G. mistura

Binomial name
- Goniocraspedon mistura (C. Swinhoe, 1891)

Synonyms
- Nagadeba mistura C. Swinhoe, 1891

Species of moth

Goniocraspedon mistura is a moth of the family Noctuidae first described by Charles Swinhoe in 1891. It is found in India, Sri Lanka and Australia.
