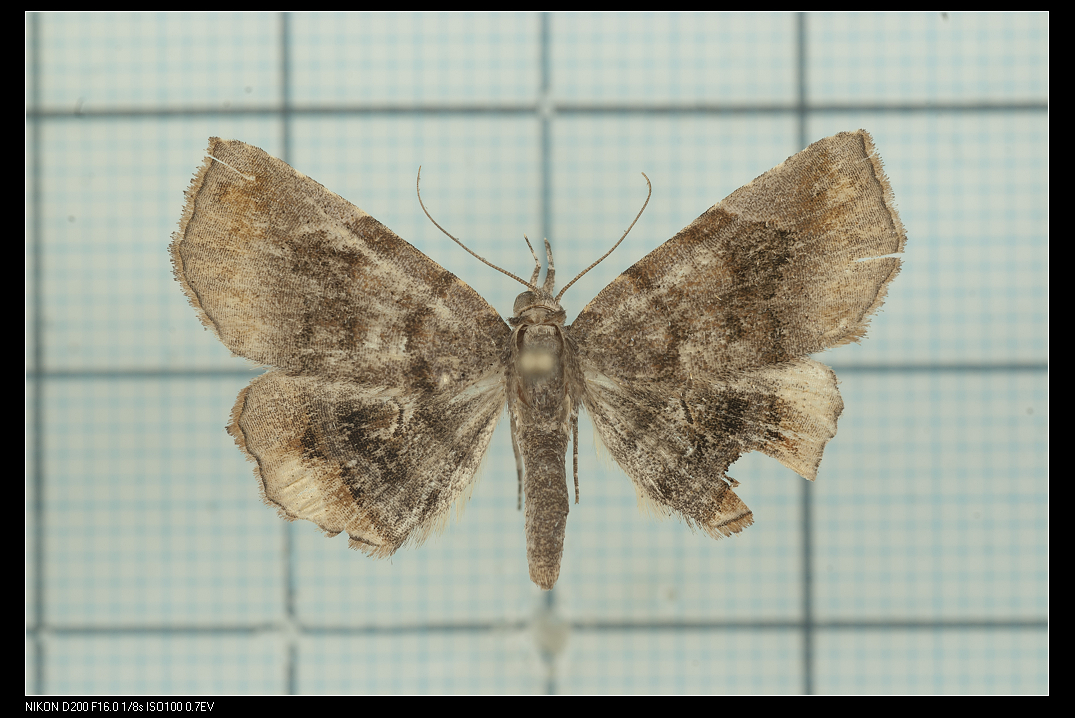

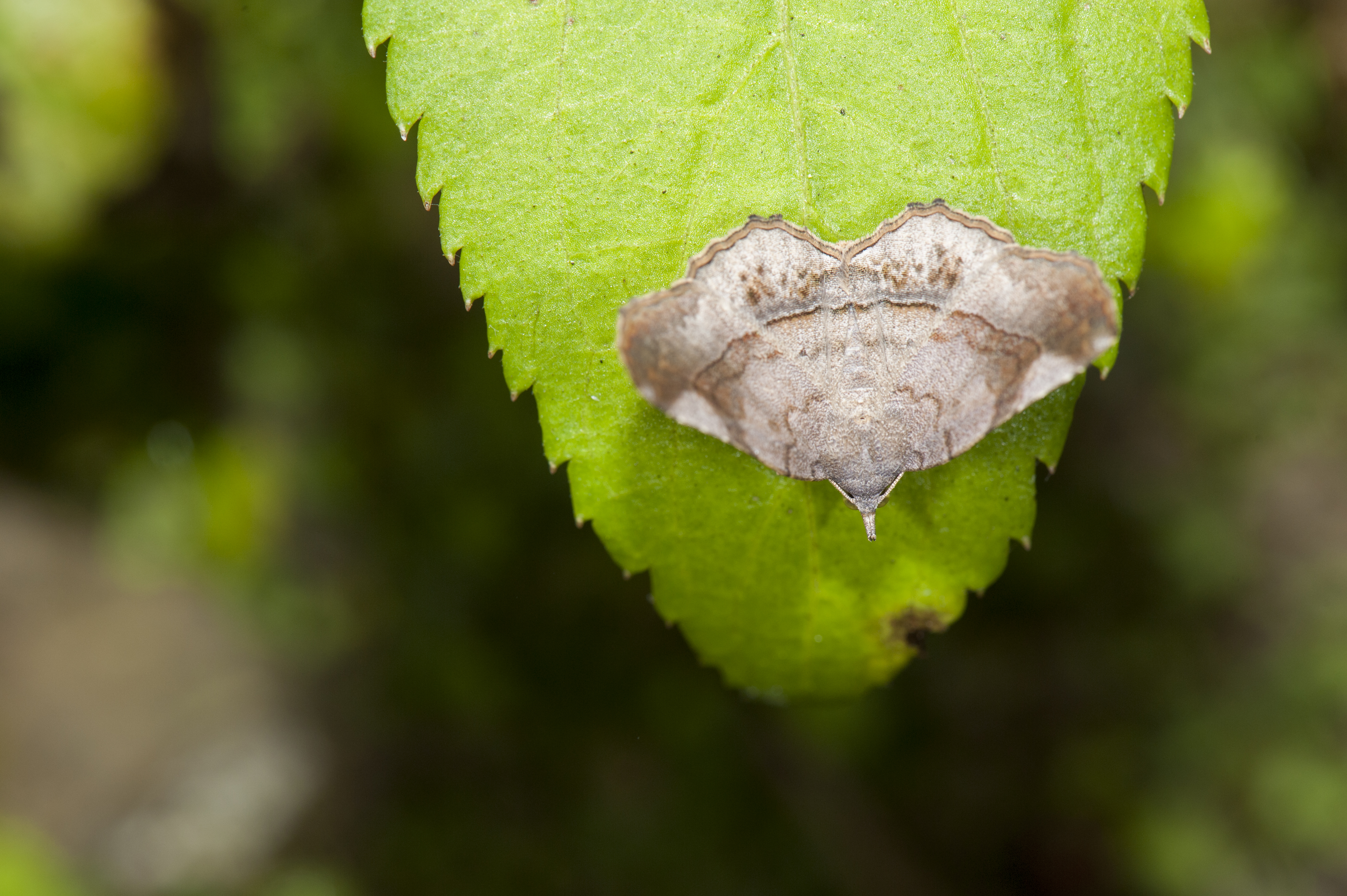

Scientific classification
- Domain: Eukaryota
- Kingdom: Animalia
- Phylum: Arthropoda
- Class: Insecta
- Order: Lepidoptera
- Superfamily: Noctuoidea
- Family: Erebidae
- Genus: Pangrapta
- Species: P. plumbilineata

Binomial name
- Pangrapta plumbilineata Wileman & West, 1929

= Pangrapta plumbilineata =

Species of moth

Pangrapta plumbilineata is a species of moth in the family Erebidae. The species is found in Taiwan.

The wingspan is 24–28 mm.
