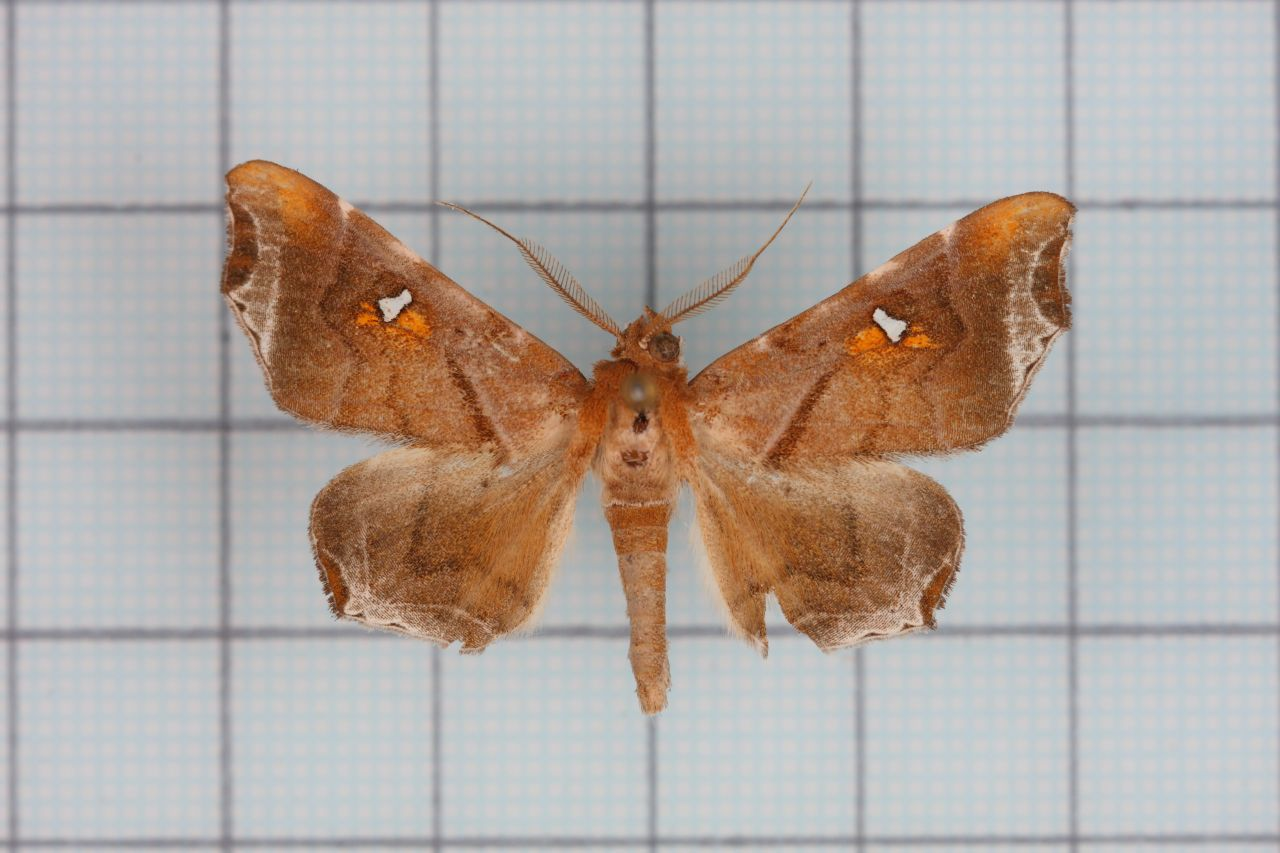
- Episparis taiwana

Scientific classification
- Kingdom: Animalia
- Phylum: Arthropoda
- Class: Insecta
- Order: Lepidoptera
- Superfamily: Noctuoidea
- Family: Erebidae
- Subfamily: Pangraptinae
- Genus: Episparis; Walker, [1857]

Synonyms
- Neviasca Walker, [1859]; Pradiota Walker, 1866; Epigrypodes Turner, 1936; Episparina Berio, 1964; Episparonia Berio, 1964

= Episparis =

Genus of moths

Episparis is a genus of moths in the family Erebidae erected by Francis Walker in 1857.

== Description ==
Palpi upturned and hairy. Third joint minute. A short frontal tuft present. Antennae bipectinated to two-thirds length in male. Thorax and abdomen clothed with coarse hair. Tibia hairy. Forewings with straight costa. Outer margin excised from vein 5 to outer angle. Hindwings with produced outer margin to a point at vein 3 and excised below the point.

== Species ==
- Episparis agnesae Pelletier, 1982
- Episparis angulatilinea Bethune-Baker, 1906
- Episparis brunoi Pelletier, 1982
- Episparis connubens Holland, 1894
- Episparis costistriga (Walker, 1864)
- Episparis emmanueli Pelletier, 1982
- Episparis experimens Walker, 1862
- Episparis farinosa Bryk, 1915
- Episparis fenestrifera Bryk, 1915
- Episparis gomphiona Hampson, 1926
- Episparis grandis Pelletier, 1982
- Episparis hannemanni Pelletier, 1982
- Episparis hieroglyphica Holland, 1894
- Episparis homoeosema Hampson, 1926
- Episparis hyalinata (Holland, 1920)
- Episparis jacquelina Swinhoe, 1902
- Episparis lamprina Holland, 1894
- Episparis leucotessellis Hampson, 1902
- Episparis liturata (Fabricius, 1787)
- Episparis lunata Holland, 1894
- Episparis malagasy Viette, 1966
- Episparis minima Pelletier, 1982
- Episparis monochroma Hampson, 1926
- Episparis okinawensis Sugi, 1982
- Episparis penetrata Walker, [1857]
- Episparis sinistra (Holland 1894)
- Episparis spilothyris Viette, 1956
- Episparis sponsata (Fabricius, 1787)
- Episparis sylvani Pelletier, 1982
- Episparis taiwana Wileman & West, 1929
- Episparis tortuosalis Moore, 1867
- Episparis varialis (Walker, 1858)
- Episparis vitrea (Saalmuller, 1891)
- Episparis xanthographa Hampson, 1926
