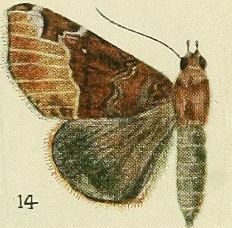

Scientific classification
- Kingdom: Animalia
- Phylum: Arthropoda
- Clade: Pancrustacea
- Class: Insecta
- Order: Lepidoptera
- Superfamily: Noctuoidea
- Family: Erebidae
- Genus: Giria
- Species: G. pectinicornis

Binomial name
- Giria pectinicornis (Bethune-Baker, 1909)

Synonyms
- Giria bubastis Fawcett, 1916; Ophiusa pectinicornisBethune-Baker, 1909

= Giria pectinicornis =

Species of moth

Giria pectinicornis is a moth species of the family Erebidae. It was first described by George Thomas Bethune-Baker in 1909. It is found from Liberia to Kenya
