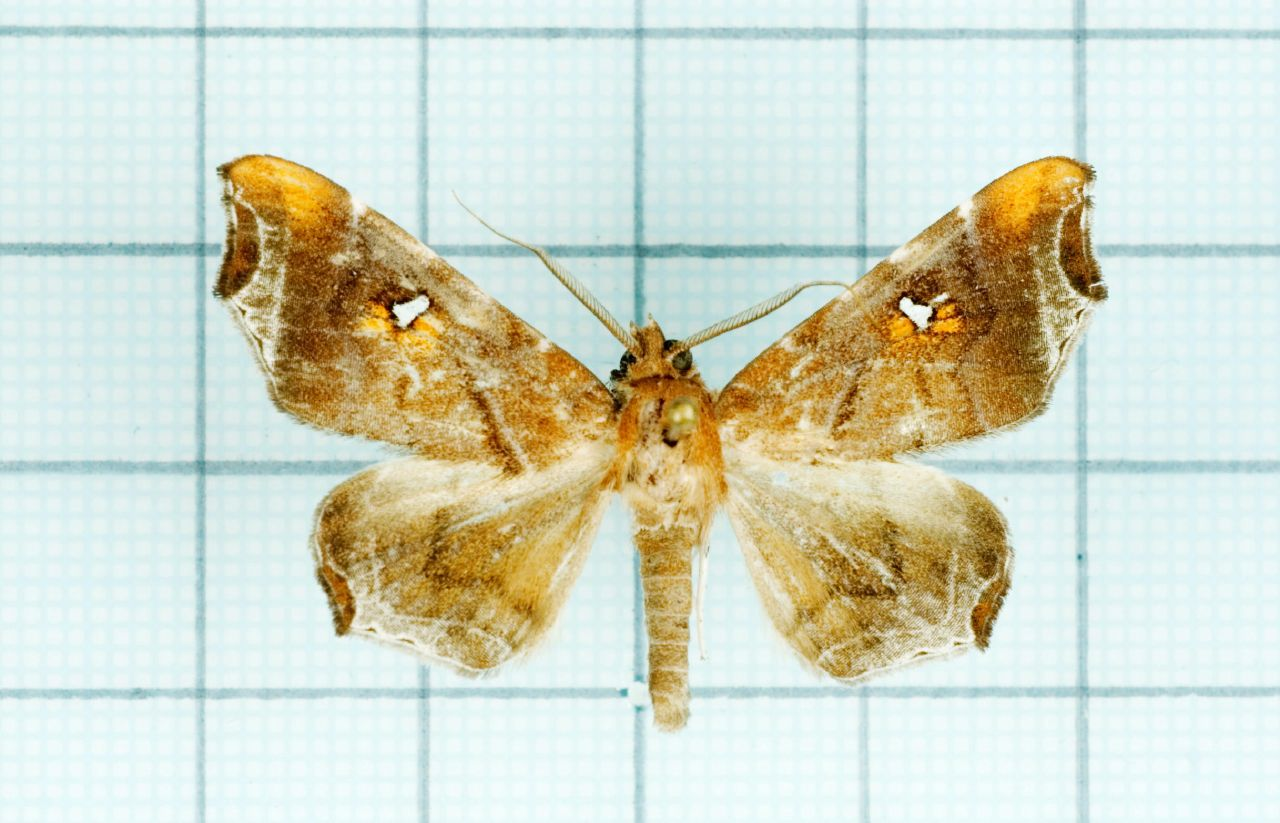

Scientific classification
- Kingdom: Animalia
- Phylum: Arthropoda
- Class: Insecta
- Order: Lepidoptera
- Superfamily: Noctuoidea
- Family: Erebidae
- Genus: Episparis
- Species: E. taiwana

Binomial name
- Episparis taiwana Wileman & West, 1929

= Episparis taiwana =

Species of moth

Episparis taiwana is a species of moth in the family Erebidae. The species is found in Taiwan.

The wingspan is 39–43 mm.
