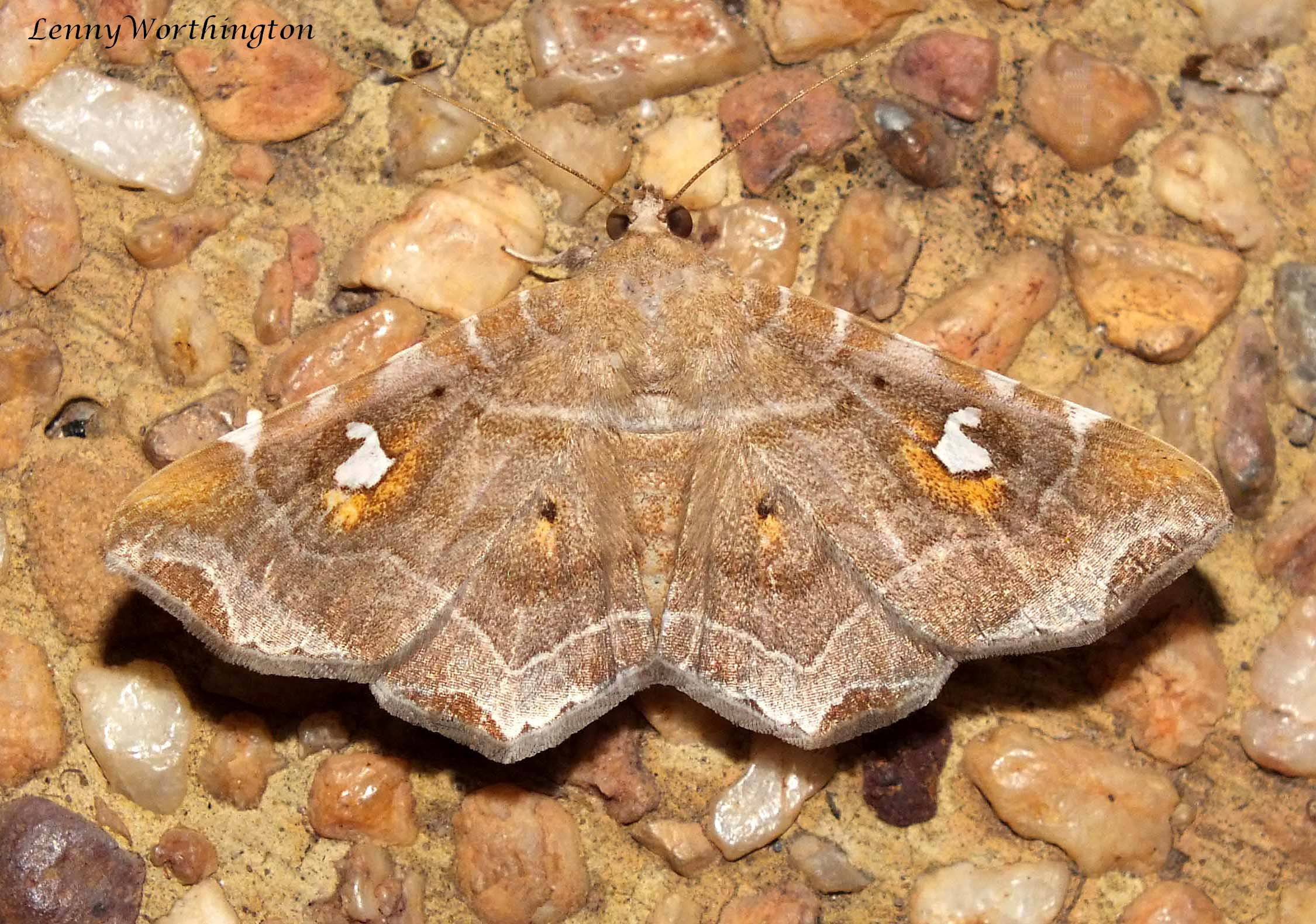

Scientific classification
- Kingdom: Animalia
- Phylum: Arthropoda
- Clade: Pancrustacea
- Class: Insecta
- Order: Lepidoptera
- Superfamily: Noctuoidea
- Family: Erebidae
- Genus: Episparis
- Species: E. liturata

Binomial name
- Episparis liturata Hampson, 1893

= Episparis liturata =

Species of moth

Episparis liturata is a moth of the family Noctuidae first described by George Hampson in 1893. It is found in India, Sri Lanka, Java, Borneo, Myanmar, China and Thailand.

== Description ==
The wingspan of the male is 41 mm. Head, thorax, abdomen and wings are pale dull reddish brown. Forewings with white line on subbasal and postmedial areas. A yellow patch is found at lower angle of cell. An irregular white spot found on the discocellulars. There is an indistinct medial dark line excurved around the cell. A pale sinuous postmedial line arising from a white spot on costa. Apical patch is yellow. Hindwing with dark mark on discocellulars. Underside of the wings is white.

The caterpillars are pale green, with pink or purplish patches, white dots and a dorsolateral white line. Setae of caterpillars are short, and development of chalazae is weak. Caterpillars are known to feed on Adina, Mitragyna and Schleichera species.
