= Globosusa =

Scientific classification
- Domain: Eukaryota
- Kingdom: Animalia
- Phylum: Arthropoda
- Class: Insecta
- Order: Lepidoptera
- Superfamily: Noctuoidea
- Family: Erebidae
- Subfamily: Hypeninae
- Genus: Globosusa; C. Swinhoe, 1918

Genus of moths

Globosusa is a genus of moths of the family Erebidae. The genus was erected by Charles Swinhoe in 1918.

== Species ==
- Globosusa borneana Holloway, 2008 Borneo
- Globosusa curiosa C. Swinhoe, 1918 Philippines
