= Gonepatica =

Scientific classification
- Kingdom: Animalia
- Phylum: Arthropoda
- Clade: Pancrustacea
- Class: Insecta
- Order: Lepidoptera
- Superfamily: Noctuoidea
- Family: Erebidae
- Subfamily: Calpinae
- Genus: Gonepatica; Sugi in Inoue, Sugi, Kuroko, Moriuti & Kawabe, 1982
- Species: G. opalina

Binomial name
- Gonepatica opalina (Butler, 1879)

Synonyms
- Egnasia opalina Butler, 1879; Madopa rectilinealis Graeser, 1888; Laspeyri lilacina Warren, 1913

Genus of moths

Gonepatica is a monotypic moth genus of the family Erebidae erected by Shigero Sugi in 1982. Its only species, Gonepatica opalina, was first described by Arthur Gardiner Butler in 1879. It is found in Japan and Amur Oblast, Russia.
