= Gustiana =

Scientific classification
- Kingdom: Animalia
- Phylum: Arthropoda
- Class: Insecta
- Order: Lepidoptera
- Superfamily: Noctuoidea
- Family: Erebidae
- Subfamily: Herminiinae
- Genus: Gustiana; Walker, 1861

Synonyms
- Gaala Walker, [1866]

Genus of moths

Gustiana is a genus of moths of the family Noctuidae. The genus was erected by Francis Walker in 1861.

== Species ==
- Gustiana abditalis (Walker, [1859]) Brazil (Rio de Janeiro)
- Gustiana risoria (Dognin, 1914) Paraguay
