= Glaucicodia =

Scientific classification
- Kingdom: Animalia
- Phylum: Arthropoda
- Class: Insecta
- Order: Lepidoptera
- Superfamily: Noctuoidea
- Family: Noctuidae
- Subfamily: Acontiinae
- Genus: Glaucicodia; Hampson, 1910
- Species: G. leuconephra

Binomial name
- Glaucicodia leuconephra Hampson, 1910

Genus and species of moth

Glaucicodia is a monotypic moth genus of the family Noctuidae. Its only species, Glaucicodia leuconephra, is found on Cuba. Both the genus and species were first described by George Hampson in 1910.
