= Goniohelia =

Scientific classification
- Kingdom: Animalia
- Phylum: Arthropoda
- Class: Insecta
- Order: Lepidoptera
- Superfamily: Noctuoidea
- Family: Erebidae
- Subfamily: Calpinae
- Genus: Goniohelia; Hampson, 1926

Genus of moths

Goniohelia is a genus of moths of the family Erebidae. The genus was erected by George Hampson in 1926.

== Species ==
- Goniohelia astrapetes Hampson, 1926 Peru
- Goniohelia fossula (Dognin, 1912) Peru
- Goniohelia gallinago (Felder & Rogenhofer, 1874) Brazil (Amazonas)
- Goniohelia pangraptica Hampson, 1926 Peru
- Goniohelia phaegonia Hampson, 1926 Brazil (Espírito Santo)
