= Girtesma =

Scientific classification
- Domain: Eukaryota
- Kingdom: Animalia
- Phylum: Arthropoda
- Class: Insecta
- Order: Lepidoptera
- Superfamily: Noctuoidea
- Family: Erebidae
- Subfamily: Herminiinae
- Genus: Girtesma; Schaus, 1913
- Species: G. messala

Binomial name
- Girtesma messala Schaus, 1913

Genus of moths

Girtesma is a monotypic moth genus of the family Erebidae. Its only species, Girtesma messala, occurs in Costa Rica. Both the genus and the species were first described by William Schaus in 1913.
