= Gonoglasa =

Scientific classification
- Kingdom: Animalia
- Phylum: Arthropoda
- Class: Insecta
- Order: Lepidoptera
- Superfamily: Noctuoidea
- Family: Erebidae
- Subfamily: Calpinae
- Genus: Gonoglasa; Hampson in Tams, 1924

Genus of moths

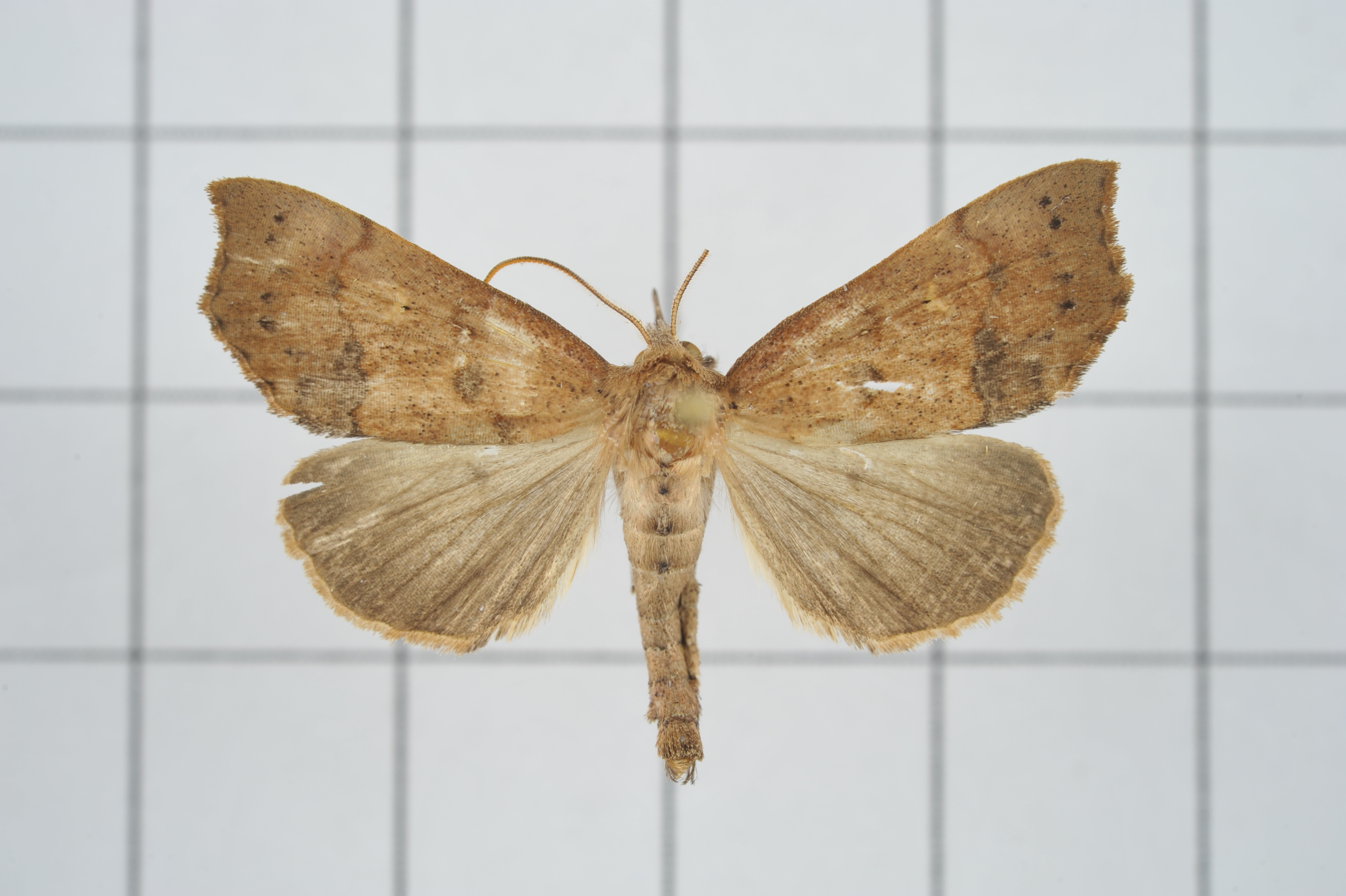

Gonoglasa is a genus of moths of the family Erebidae. The genus was erected by George Hampson in 1924.

== Species ==
- Gonoglasa camptogramma Hampson, 1924 Thailand, Sumatra, Borneo
- Gonoglasa contigua (Wileman, 1915) Formosa
- Gonoglasa nigripalpis (Walker, [1863]) Thailand, Sumatra, Borneo
- Gonoglasa sinuilinea Hampson, 1926 Sri Lanka
