= Gorua =

Scientific classification
- Kingdom: Animalia
- Phylum: Arthropoda
- Class: Insecta
- Order: Lepidoptera
- Superfamily: Noctuoidea
- Family: Erebidae
- Subfamily: Calpinae
- Genus: Gorua; Walker, 1865

Genus of moths

Gorua is a genus of moths of the family Erebidae. The genus was erected by Francis Walker in 1865.

== Species ==
- Gorua apicata (Holland, 1894) Sierra Leone, Togo, Gabon, Zaire
- Gorua partita Walker, 1865 Sierra Leone, Togo, Gabon, Cameroon
- Gorua polita Prout, 1921 Zaire, Ghana, Togo
