= Gonuris =

Scientific classification
- Domain: Eukaryota
- Kingdom: Animalia
- Phylum: Arthropoda
- Class: Insecta
- Order: Lepidoptera
- Superfamily: Noctuoidea
- Family: Erebidae
- Subfamily: Calpinae
- Genus: Gonuris; Möschler, 1880

Genus of moths

Gonuris is a genus of moths of the family Erebidae. The genus was erected by Heinrich Benno Möschler in 1880.

== Species ==
- Gonuris flaminia Möschler, 1880 Suriname
- Gonuris leonnatus Schaus, 1914 French Guiana
- Gonuris perdica (Stoll, [1782]) Suriname
