= Gaedeodes =

Scientific classification
- Kingdom: Animalia
- Phylum: Arthropoda
- Class: Insecta
- Order: Lepidoptera
- Superfamily: Noctuoidea
- Family: Erebidae
- Subfamily: Herminiinae
- Genus: Gaedeodes; Fletcher & Viette, 1955

Genus of moths

Gaedeodes is a genus of moths of the family Noctuidae. The genus was erected by David Stephen Fletcher and Pierre Viette in 1955.

== Species ==
- Gaedeodes collenettei Fletcher & Viette, 1955 Ivory Coast
- Gaedeodes testacea Fletcher & Viette, 1955 Guinea
