= Geometrimima =

Scientific classification
- Domain: Eukaryota
- Kingdom: Animalia
- Phylum: Arthropoda
- Class: Insecta
- Order: Lepidoptera
- Superfamily: Noctuoidea
- Family: Erebidae
- Subfamily: Calpinae
- Genus: Geometrimima; Holland, 1894
- Species: G. callista

Binomial name
- Geometrimima callista Holland, 1894

Genus of moths

Geometrimima is a monotypic moth genus of the family Erebidae. Its only species, Geometrimima callista, is found in Gabon. Both the genus and the species were first described by William Jacob Holland in 1894.
