= Galleridia =

Scientific classification
- Kingdom: Animalia
- Phylum: Arthropoda
- Class: Insecta
- Order: Lepidoptera
- Superfamily: Noctuoidea
- Family: Erebidae
- Subfamily: Calpinae
- Genus: Galleridia; Hampson, 1896

Genus of moths

Galleridia is a genus of moths of the family Erebidae. The genus was erected by George Hampson in 1896.

== Species ==
- Galleridia atrisigna Hampson, 1896 Sri Lanka to Yemen
- Galleridia fuscizonea Hampson, 1896 Sri Lanka
- Galleridia suffumata Hacker & Sadie, 2016 Arabia
