= Gigides =

Scientific classification
- Kingdom: Animalia
- Phylum: Arthropoda
- Class: Insecta
- Order: Lepidoptera
- Superfamily: Noctuoidea
- Family: Erebidae
- Subfamily: Calpinae
- Genus: Gigides; Hampson, 1926

Genus of moths

Gigides is a genus of moths of the family Erebidae. The genus was erected by George Hampson in 1926.

== Species ==
- Gigides distorta (Dognin, 1914) Colombia
- Gigides ferreolepra Hampson, 1926 Peru
- Gigides megalops Hampson, 1926 Peru
