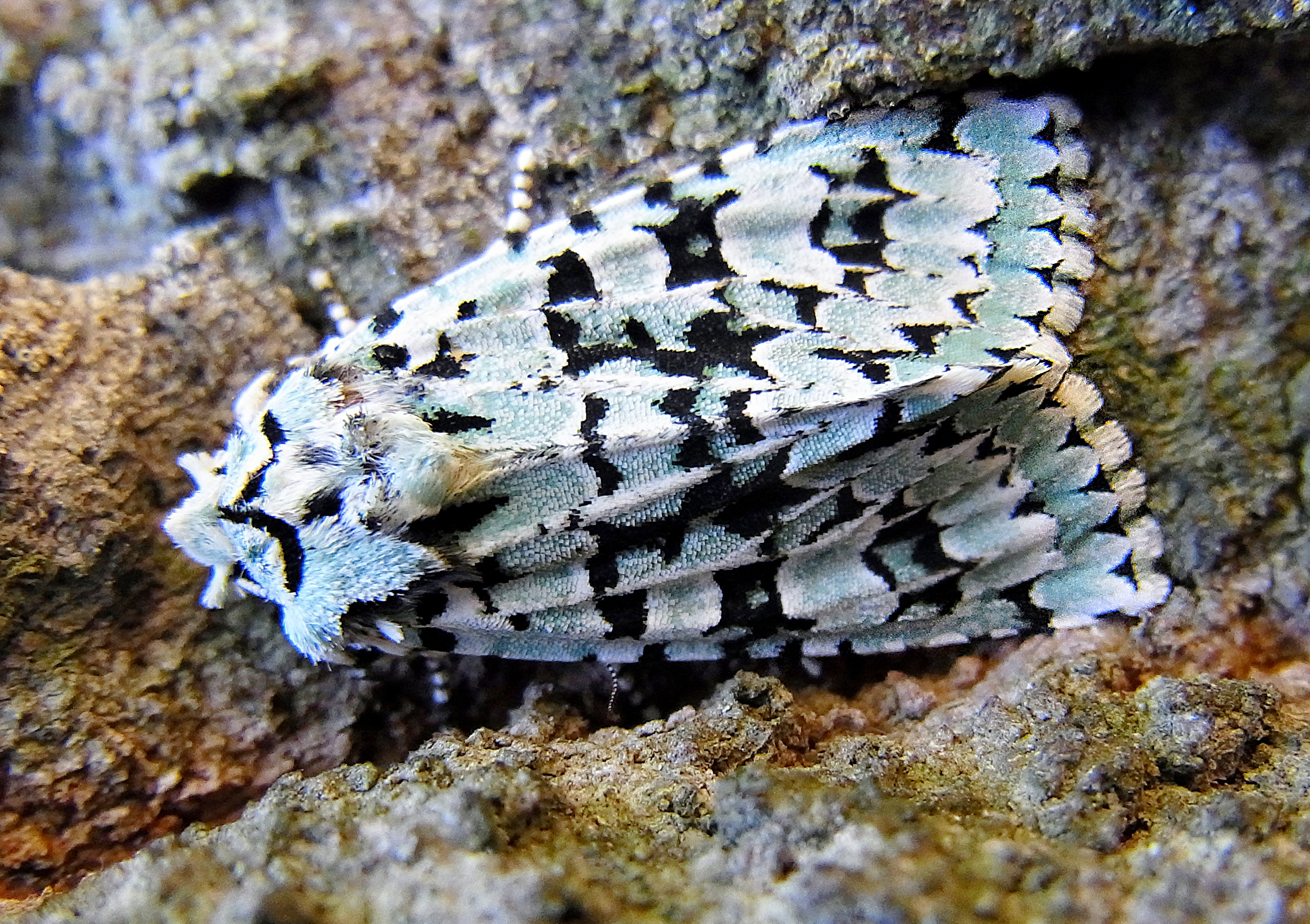
- Griposia aprilina

Scientific classification
- Domain: Eukaryota
- Kingdom: Animalia
- Phylum: Arthropoda
- Class: Insecta
- Order: Lepidoptera
- Superfamily: Noctuoidea
- Family: Noctuidae
- Subfamily: Cuculliinae
- Genus: Griposia; Tams, 1939

= Griposia =

Genus of moths

Griposia is a genus of moths of the family Noctuidae.

== Species in Europa ==
- Griposia aprilina
- Griposia pinkeri
- Griposia skyvai
- Griposia wegneri
