= Gracilopsis =

Scientific classification
- Kingdom: Animalia
- Phylum: Arthropoda
- Class: Insecta
- Order: Lepidoptera
- Superfamily: Noctuoidea
- Family: Erebidae
- Subfamily: Calpinae
- Genus: Gracilopsis; Hampson, 1926
- Species: G. guianensis

Binomial name
- Gracilopsis guianensis Hampson, 1926

Genus of moths

Gracilopsis is a monotypic moth genus of the family Erebidae. Its only species, Gracilopsis guianensis, is found in Guyana. Both the genus and species were first described by George Hampson in 1926.
