= Gelenipsa =

Scientific classification
- Domain: Eukaryota
- Kingdom: Animalia
- Phylum: Arthropoda
- Class: Insecta
- Order: Lepidoptera
- Superfamily: Noctuoidea
- Family: Noctuidae
- Subfamily: Acontiinae
- Genus: Gelenipsa; Dyar, 1914
- Species: G. psychodidarum

Binomial name
- Gelenipsa psychodidarum Dyar, 1914

Genus of moths

Gelenipsa is a monotypic moth genus of the family Noctuidae. Its only species, Gelenipsa psychodidarum, is found in Panama. Both the genus and species were first described by Harrison Gray Dyar Jr. in 1914.
