= Geniascota =

Scientific classification
- Kingdom: Animalia
- Phylum: Arthropoda
- Class: Insecta
- Order: Lepidoptera
- Superfamily: Noctuoidea
- Family: Erebidae
- Subfamily: Calpinae
- Genus: Geniascota; Hampson, 1926

Genus of moths

Geniascota is a genus of moths of the family Erebidae. The genus was erected by George Hampson in 1926.

== Species ==
- Geniascota lacteata Hampson, 1926 southern Nigeria
- Geniascota patagiata Hampson, 1926 Kenya, Malawi, Mozambique
- Geniascota trichoptycha Hampson, 1926 southern Nigeria
