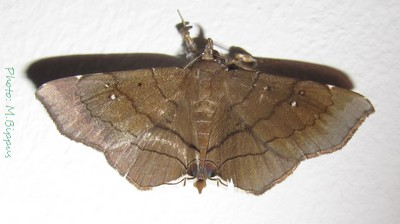

Scientific classification
- Kingdom: Animalia
- Phylum: Arthropoda
- Class: Insecta
- Order: Lepidoptera
- Superfamily: Noctuoidea
- Family: Erebidae
- Subfamily: Pangraptinae
- Genus: Gracilodes (Guenée, 1852)

= Gracilodes =

Genus of moths

Gracilodes is a genus of moths in the family Erebidae.

== Species ==
Species include:

- Gracilodes angulalis - Guillermet, 1992
- Gracilodes angustipennis - Gaede 1940
- Gracilodes caffra - Guenee 1852
- Gracilodes disticha - Hampson 1926
- Gracilodes finissima - Berio 1956
- Gracilodes fuscosa - (Holland 1894)
- Gracilodes metopis - Hampson 1926
- Gracilodes nyctichroa - Hampson 1926
- Gracilodes nysa - Guenee 1852
- Gracilodes opisthenops - Hampson 1926
