= Graphantha =

Scientific classification
- Domain: Eukaryota
- Kingdom: Animalia
- Phylum: Arthropoda
- Class: Insecta
- Order: Lepidoptera
- Superfamily: Noctuoidea
- Family: Noctuidae
- Subfamily: Xyleninae
- Genus: Graphantha

Genus of moths

Graphantha is a genus of moths of the family Noctuidae.

== Species ==
- Graphantha commoda Staudinger, 1889
- Graphantha minuta Püngeler, 1900
- Graphantha stenoptera Boursin, 1970
