= Gonippa =

Scientific classification
- Domain: Eukaryota
- Kingdom: Animalia
- Phylum: Arthropoda
- Class: Insecta
- Order: Lepidoptera
- Superfamily: Noctuoidea
- Family: Erebidae
- Subfamily: Calpinae
- Genus: Gonippa; Möschler, 1883
- Species: G. perusia

Binomial name
- Gonippa perusia Möschler, 1883

Genus and species of moth

Gonippa is a monotypic moth genus of the family Erebidae. Its only species, Gonippa perusia, is found in Suriname. Both the genus and species were first described by Heinrich Benno Möschler in 1883.
