= Gonophaea =

Scientific classification
- Kingdom: Animalia
- Phylum: Arthropoda
- Class: Insecta
- Order: Lepidoptera
- Superfamily: Noctuoidea
- Family: Noctuidae
- Subfamily: Acontiinae
- Genus: Gonophaea; Hampson, 1910
- Species: G. villica

Binomial name
- Gonophaea villica (Schaus, 1904)

Synonyms
- Tarache villica Schaus, 1904

Genus of moths

Gonophaea is a monotypic moth genus of the family Noctuidae erected by George Hampson in 1910. Its only species, Gonophaea villica, was first described by Schaus in 1904. It is found in the Brazilian state of São Paulo.
