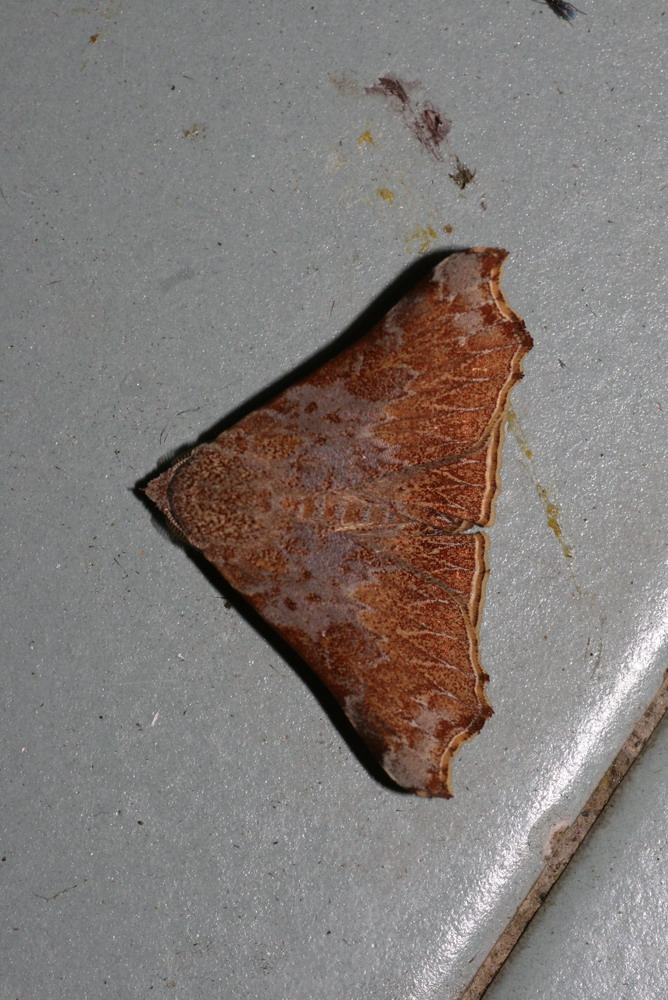
- Goniophila excavata

Scientific classification
- Kingdom: Animalia
- Phylum: Arthropoda
- Class: Insecta
- Order: Lepidoptera
- Superfamily: Noctuoidea
- Family: Erebidae
- Subfamily: Calpinae
- Genus: Goniophila; Hampson, 1926

Type species
- Cosmophila excavata C. Swinhoe, 1905

= Goniophila =

Genus of moths

Goniophila is a genus of moths of the family Erebidae. The genus was erected by George Hampson in 1926.

== Species ==
- Goniophila ashleyi (Holloway, 2005) Borneo
- Goniophila excavata (Swinhoe, 1905) Sundaland
- Goniophila hampsoni (Leech, 1900) western China
- Goniophila lichenea (Holland, 1900) Buru
- Goniophila niphosticha Hampson, 1926 Myanmar, Thailand, Borneo
- Goniophila polymima de Joannis, 1929 Vietnam
