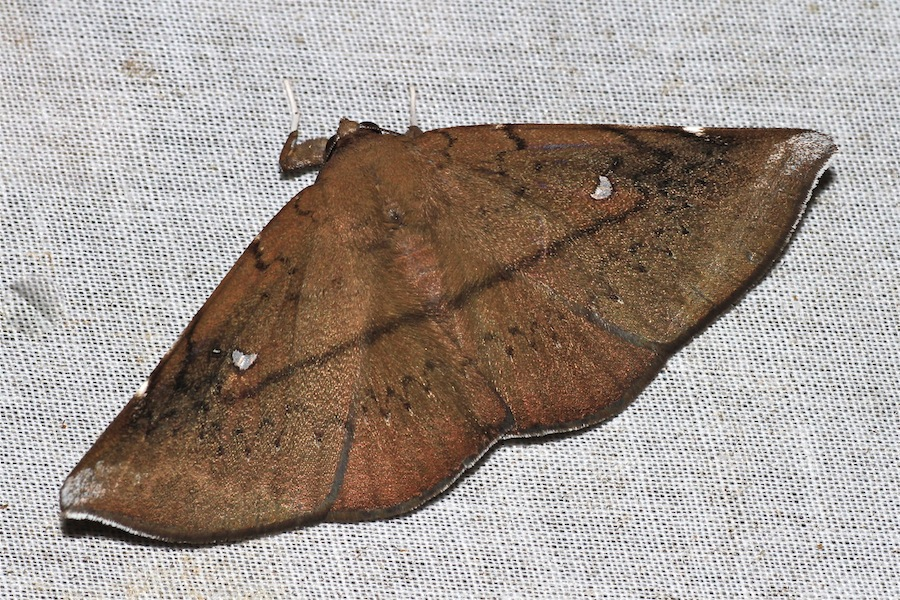
- Gespanna confirmata from Trusmadi hill dipterocarp forest in Borneo

Scientific classification
- Kingdom: Animalia
- Phylum: Arthropoda
- Class: Insecta
- Order: Lepidoptera
- Superfamily: Noctuoidea
- Family: Erebidae
- Subfamily: Erebinae
- Genus: Gespanna; Swinhoe, 1900

= Gespanna =

Genus of moths

Gespanna is a genus of moths in the family Erebidae. The genus was erected by Charles Swinhoe in 1900. It occurs in Southeast Asia.

== Species ==
There are two recognized species:

- Gespanna amelieae Zilli, 2020 – Sulawesi
- Gespanna confirmata (Walker, 1859) – Sundaland

The Global Lepidoptera Index lists Gespanna pectoralis (Walker, 1864) as the sole species of the genus, whereas Savela's list and Zilli (2020) treat it as a junior synonym of Gespanna confirmata (Walker, 1859).
