= Gonagyra =

Scientific classification
- Kingdom: Animalia
- Phylum: Arthropoda
- Class: Insecta
- Order: Lepidoptera
- Superfamily: Noctuoidea
- Family: Erebidae
- Subfamily: Calpinae
- Genus: Gonagyra; Hampson, 1926
- Species: G. metabrachys

Binomial name
- Gonagyra metabrachys Hampson, 1926

Genus of moths

Gonagyra is a monotypic moth genus of the family Erebidae. Its only species, Gonagyra metabrachys, is found in Peru. Both the genus and species were first described by George Hampson in 1926.
