= Goniocraspedon =

Scientific classification
- Kingdom: Animalia
- Phylum: Arthropoda
- Class: Insecta
- Order: Lepidoptera
- Superfamily: Noctuoidea
- Family: Erebidae
- Subfamily: Calpinae
- Genus: Goniocraspedon; Hampson, 1893

Synonyms
- Goniocraspedum Hampson 1895 (unjustified emendation)

Genus of moths

Goniocraspedon is a genus of moths of the family Erebidae described by George Hampson in 1993.

== Species ==
- Goniocraspedon mistura Swinhoe, 1891
- Goniocraspedon subdentata Schaus, 1911
