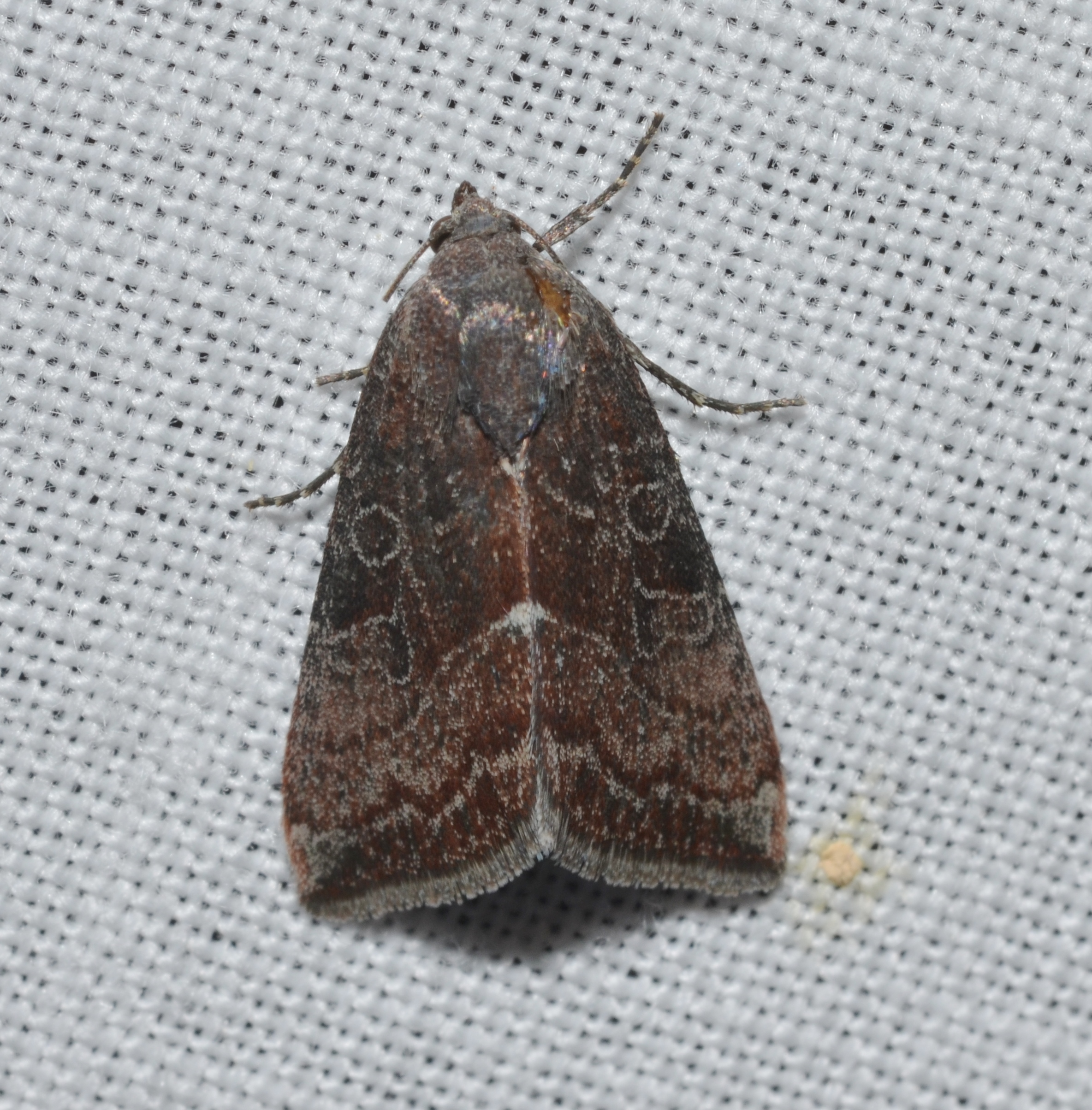
- G. partita

Scientific classification
- Kingdom: Animalia
- Phylum: Arthropoda
- Class: Insecta
- Order: Lepidoptera
- Superfamily: Noctuoidea
- Family: Noctuidae
- Genus: Galgula; Guenée, 1852

= Galgula =

Genus of moths

Galgula is a genus of moths of the family Noctuidae.

== Species ==
- Galgula castra Schaus, 1898
- Galgula partita Guenée, 1852
- Galgula subapicalis Hampson, 1909
