= Gonodes =

Scientific classification
- Domain: Eukaryota
- Kingdom: Animalia
- Phylum: Arthropoda
- Class: Insecta
- Order: Lepidoptera
- Superfamily: Noctuoidea
- Family: Noctuidae
- Genus: Gonodes; H. Druce, 1908

Genus of moths

Gonodes is a genus of moths of the family Noctuidae. The genus was erected by Herbert Druce in 1908.

== Species ==
- Gonodes albifascia Hampson, 1918
- Gonodes albifissa H. Druce, 1908
- Gonodes aroensis (Schaus, 1904)
- Gonodes cuneata Dyar, 1914
- Gonodes densissima Dyar, 1914
- Gonodes dianiphea E. D. Jones, 1908
- Gonodes echion Schaus, 1914
- Gonodes lilla E. D. Jones, 1914
- Gonodes liquida (Möschler, 1886)
- Gonodes netopha Schaus, 1911
- Gonodes obliqua H. Druce, 1909
- Gonodes pallida E. D. Jones, 1914
- Gonodes trapezoides (Herrich-Schäffer, 1868)
