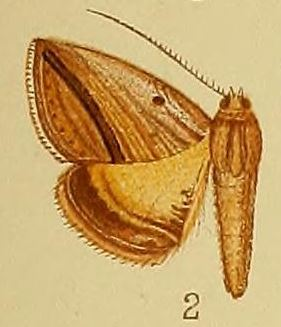
- Gnamptogyia diagonalis

Scientific classification
- Kingdom: Animalia
- Phylum: Arthropoda
- Class: Insecta
- Order: Lepidoptera
- Superfamily: Noctuoidea
- Family: Erebidae
- Subfamily: Calpinae
- Genus: Gnamptogyia; Hampson, 1894

= Gnamptogyia =

Genus of moths

Gnamptogyia is a genus of moths of the family Erebidae. The genus was erected by George Hampson in 1894.

== Species ==
Based on Afromoths and The Global Lepidoptera Names Index:

- Gnamptogyia diagonalis Hampson, 1910 (from Kenya and Zambia)
- Gnamptogyia multilineata Hampson, 1894
- Gnamptogyia strigalis Strand, 1912 (from Tanzania)
