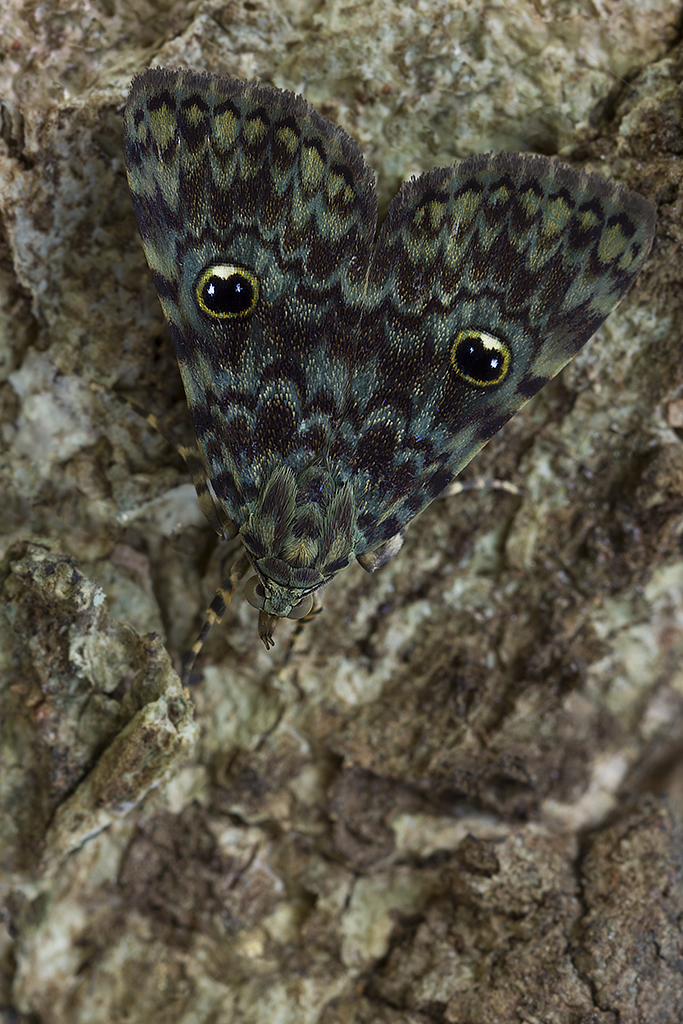
- Glenopteris oculifera

Scientific classification
- Domain: Eukaryota
- Kingdom: Animalia
- Phylum: Arthropoda
- Class: Insecta
- Order: Lepidoptera
- Superfamily: Noctuoidea
- Family: Erebidae
- Subfamily: Calpinae
- Genus: Glenopteris; Hübner, 1821

Type species
- Glenopteris oculifera Hübner, 1821

Synonyms
- Glenoptera Schaus, 1911

= Glenopteris =

Genus of moths

Glenopteris is a genus of moths of the family Erebidae. The genus was erected by Jacob Hübner in 1821.

== Species ==
- Glenopteris herbidalis Guenée, 1854 Brazil
- Glenopteris oculifera Hübner, [1821] Suriname
- Glenopteris ornata (Schaus, 1911) Costa Rica
