= Gaedonea =

Scientific classification
- Domain: Eukaryota
- Kingdom: Animalia
- Phylum: Arthropoda
- Class: Insecta
- Order: Lepidoptera
- Superfamily: Noctuoidea
- Family: Erebidae
- Subfamily: Calpinae
- Genus: Gaedonea; Berio, 1966
- Species: G. rosealutea

Binomial name
- Gaedonea rosealutea Berio, 1966

Genus of moths

Gaedonea is a monotypic moth genus of the family Erebidae. Its only species, Gaedonea rosealutea, is found on Madagascar. Both the genus and the species were first described by Emilio Berio in 1966.
