= Oxidercia =

Scientific classification
- Kingdom: Animalia
- Phylum: Arthropoda
- Clade: Pancrustacea
- Class: Insecta
- Order: Lepidoptera
- Superfamily: Noctuoidea
- Family: Erebidae
- Subfamily: Calpinae
- Genus: Oxidercia; Hübner, [1825]

Synonyms
- Oxydercia Agassiz, 1847; Gangra Walker, 1862; Paranympha Butler, 1879

Genus of moths

Oxidercia is a genus of moths of the family Erebidae. The genus was erected by Jacob Hübner in 1825.

== Species ==
- Oxidercia acripennis (Felder & Rogenhofer, 1874) Brazil (Amazonas)
- Oxidercia albocostata (Butler, 1879) Brazil (Amazonas)
- Oxidercia apicalis (Walker, 1865) Brazil (Rio de Janeiro)
- Oxidercia asaphisema Hampson, 1926 Guyana
- Oxidercia atripustula (Walker, 1862) Brazil (Amazonas, São Paulo)
- Oxidercia carpnophora Hampson, 1926 Brazil (Rio Grande do Sul)
- Oxidercia cymatistis Hampson, 1926 Brazil (Para)
- Oxidercia denticulosa (Walker, 1865) Brazil (Amazonas)
- Oxidercia discophora Hampson, 1926 Panama
- Oxidercia dorcanderalis (Walker, 1859) Brazil (Amazonas)
- Oxidercia excisa Hampson, 1926 Brazil (Rio de Janeiro)
- Oxidercia laloides (Dognin 1897) Ecuador
- Oxidercia lepraota Hampson, 1926 Guyana
- Oxidercia nigrirena Hampson, 1924 Trinidad
- Oxidercia nucleola Hampson, 1926 Guyana
- Oxidercia punctularis (Walker, 1865) Brazil (Amazonas)
- Oxidercia sciogramma Hampson, 1926 Venezuela
- Oxidercia thaumantis Hampson, 1926 Guyana
- Oxidercia thermeola Hampson, 1926 Peru
- Oxidercia toxea (Stoll, [1781]) Colombia, Suriname, Brazil (Amazonas)
