= Gerrodes =

Scientific classification
- Kingdom: Animalia
- Phylum: Arthropoda
- Class: Insecta
- Order: Lepidoptera
- Superfamily: Noctuoidea
- Family: Noctuidae
- Subfamily: Agaristinae
- Genus: Gerrodes; Hampson, 1908

Genus of moths

Gerrodes is a genus of moths of the family Noctuidae.

== Species ==
- Gerrodes longipes Druce, 1889
- Gerrodes minatea Dyar, 1912
- Gerrodes minor Dognin, 1914
