= Grammesia =

Scientific classification
- Kingdom: Animalia
- Phylum: Arthropoda
- Class: Insecta
- Order: Lepidoptera
- Superfamily: Noctuoidea
- Family: Noctuidae
- Genus: Grammesia

Genus of moths

Grammesia is a genus of moths of the family Noctuidae.

== Species ==
Grammesia trigrammica Hilbn.

Grammesia trilinea Bork.
