= Gizama =

Scientific classification
- Kingdom: Animalia
- Phylum: Arthropoda
- Class: Insecta
- Order: Lepidoptera
- Superfamily: Noctuoidea
- Family: Erebidae
- Subfamily: Hypeninae
- Genus: Gizama; Walker, [1859]

Genus of moths

Gizama is a genus of moths of the family Erebidae. The genus was erected by Francis Walker in 1859.

== Species ==
- Gizama bronsonalis Schaus, 1916 Costa Rica
- Gizama cucullalis Dognin, 1914 Ecuador
- Gizama midasalis Walker, [1859] Venezuela
- Gizama undilinealis Schaus, 1916 Mexico
