= Gnathogonia =

Scientific classification
- Kingdom: Animalia
- Phylum: Arthropoda
- Class: Insecta
- Order: Lepidoptera
- Superfamily: Noctuoidea
- Family: Erebidae
- Subfamily: Calpinae
- Genus: Gnathogonia; Hampson, 1926
- Species: G. plecopteridia

Binomial name
- Gnathogonia plecopteridia (Hampson, 1907)

Synonyms
- Bocula plecopteridia Hampson, 1907

Genus of moths

Gnathogonia is a monotypic moth genus of the family Erebidae. Its only species, Gnathogonia plecopteridia, is found in Mumbai, India. Both the genus and the species were first described by George Hampson, the genus in 1926 and the species 19 years earlier in 1907.
