= Gammace =

Scientific classification
- Kingdom: Animalia
- Phylum: Arthropoda
- Class: Insecta
- Order: Lepidoptera
- Superfamily: Noctuoidea
- Family: Erebidae
- Subfamily: Calpinae
- Genus: Gammace; Walker, 1862
- Species: G. magniplaga

Binomial name
- Gammace magniplaga Walker, 1862

Genus of moths

Gammace is a monotypic moth genus of the family Erebidae. Its only species, Gammace magniplaga, is found in Brazil. Both the genus and the species were first described by Francis Walker in 1862.

The Global Lepidoptera Names Index gives this name as a synonym of Baniana Walker, 1858.
