= Gabyna =

Scientific classification
- Domain: Eukaryota
- Kingdom: Animalia
- Phylum: Arthropoda
- Class: Insecta
- Order: Lepidoptera
- Superfamily: Noctuoidea
- Family: Erebidae
- Subfamily: Calpinae
- Genus: Gabyna; Möschler, 1880

Genus of moths

Gabyna is a genus of moths of the family Erebidae. The genus was described by Heinrich Benno Möschler in 1880.

== Species ==
- Gabyna coerulina (Möschler, 1880) Suriname
- Gabyna erratrix Möschler, 1880 Suriname
- Gabyna metaloba Hampson, 1926 Peru
- Gabyna placida Butler, 1879 Brazil (Amazonas)
