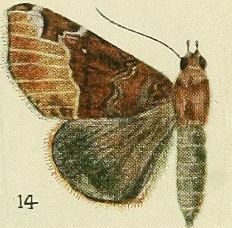
- Giria pectinicornis

Scientific classification
- Kingdom: Animalia
- Phylum: Arthropoda
- Clade: Pancrustacea
- Class: Insecta
- Order: Lepidoptera
- Superfamily: Noctuoidea
- Family: Erebidae
- Subfamily: Erebinae
- Genus: Giria; Fawcett, 1916

Type species
- Giria pectinicornis (Bethune-Baker, 1909)

= Giria (moth) =

Genus of moths

Giria is a moth genus of the family Erebidae erected by James Farish Malcolm Fawcett in 1916.

Species:

- Giria laportei Pelletier, 1977
- Giria pectinicornis Bethune-Baker, 1909
