= Masca abactalis =

Scientific classification
- Kingdom: Animalia
- Phylum: Arthropoda
- Class: Insecta
- Order: Lepidoptera
- Superfamily: Noctuoidea
- Family: Erebidae
- Genus: Masca; Walker, 1859
- Species: M. abactalis

Binomial name
- Masca abactalis Walker, 1859

Synonyms
- Generic: Phagytra Walker, [1866]; Specific: Phagytra leucogastralis Walker, [1866]; Metria platypoda Felder & Rogenhofer, 1874; Masca bicolora Bethune-Baker

Species of moth

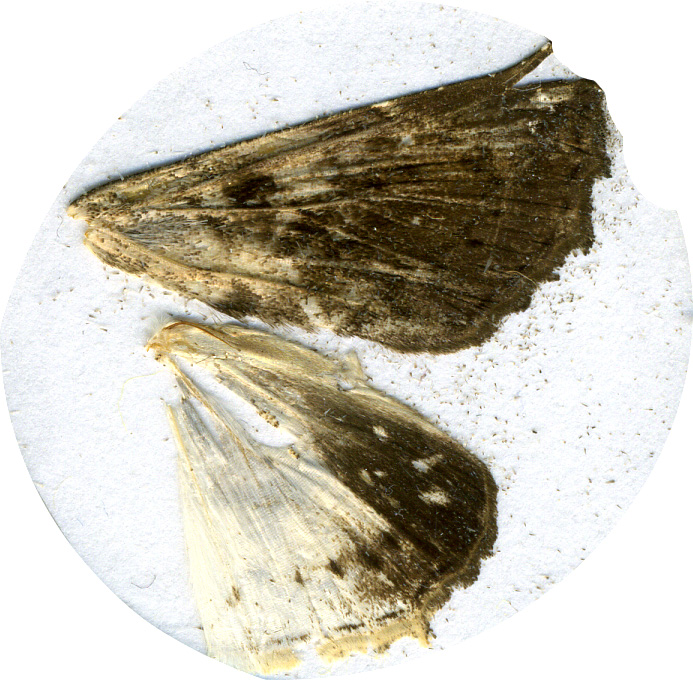
Masca abactalis specimen

Masca is a monotypic moth genus in the family Erebidae. Its only species, Masca abactalis, is found in Myanmar and from Sundaland to New Guinea. Both the genus and the species were first described by Francis Walker in 1858.
