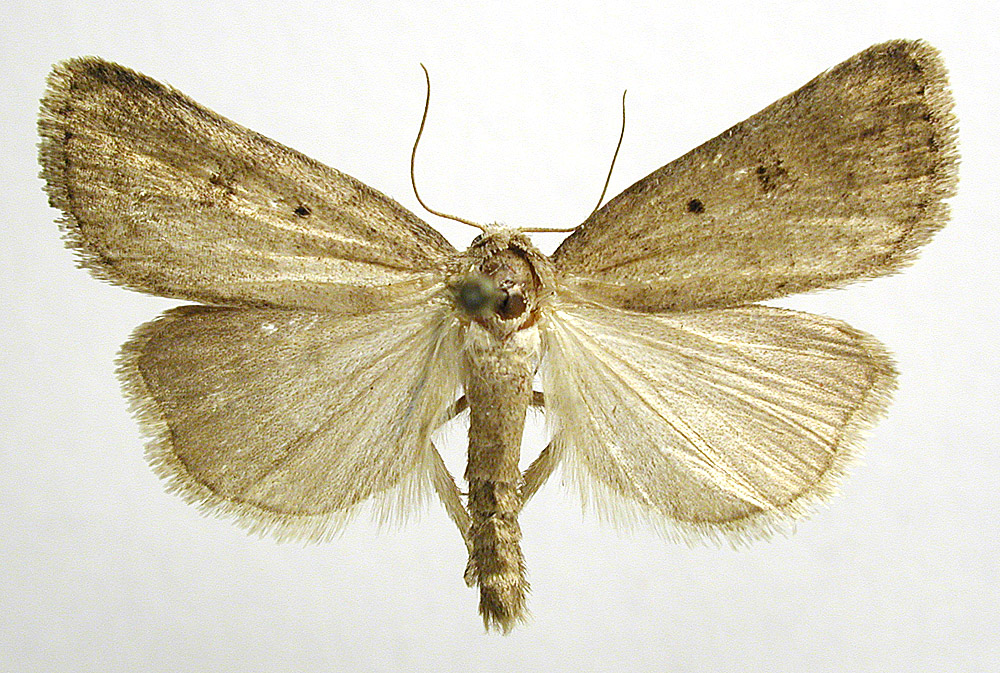
- Athetis gluteosa

Scientific classification
- Kingdom: Animalia
- Phylum: Arthropoda
- Clade: Pancrustacea
- Class: Insecta
- Order: Lepidoptera
- Superfamily: Noctuoidea
- Family: Noctuidae
- Tribe: Caradrinini
- Genus: Athetis; Hübner, [1821]

Synonyms
- Dadica Moore, 1881; Elydna Walker, 1858; Floccifera Hampson, 1894; Hydrillula Tams, 1938; Nebrissa Walker, 1862; Proxenus Herrich-Schäffer, 1845; Radinacra Butler, 1878; Radinogoes Butler, 1886; Strepselydna Warren, 1912; Stygiathetis Hampson, 1908; Tectorea Berio, 1955

= Athetis =

Genus of moths

Athetis is a genus of moths of the family Noctuidae. The genus was erected by Jacob Hübner in 1821.

== Species ==
- Athetis absorbens (Walker, [1857])
- Athetis acutipennis (Dognin, 1919)
- Athetis aeschria Hampson, 1909
- Athetis aeschrioides Berio, 1940
- Athetis alacra (Prout, 1928)
- Athetis albanalis (Warren, 1912)
- Athetis albilineola Prout, 1928
- Athetis albipuncta (Hampson, 1902)
- Athetis albirena (Hampson, 1902)
- Athetis albisignata (Oberthür, 1879)
- Athetis albispinosa (Saalmüller, 1880)
- Athetis albosignata (Oberthür, 1879)
- Athetis alternata (Janse, 1938)
- Athetis andriai Viette, 1963
- Athetis anomoeosis Hampson, 1909
- Athetis atriluna (Warren, 1913)
- Athetis atripuncta (Hampson, 1910)
- Athetis atrispherica Hampson, 1914
- Athetis atristicta Hampson, 1918
- Athetis autobrunnea (Janse, 1938)
- Athetis bicolor (Chrétien, 1913)
- Athetis bicornis (Hampson, 1891)
- Athetis bicornuta Galsworthy, 1997
- Athetis bilimbata Berio, 1976
- Athetis bimacula (Walker, 1862)
- Athetis bipuncta (Snellen, [1886])
- Athetis biserrata Han & Kononenko, 2011
- Athetis bisignata (Hampson, 1907)
- Athetis biumbrosa (Berio, 1940)
- Athetis bremusa (Swinhoe, 1885)
- Athetis brunneaplagata (Bethune-Baker, 1911)
- Athetis brunneolineosa Kononenko, 2005
- Athetis bytinskii (Schawerda, 1934)
- Athetis calypta Viette, 1958
- Athetis camptogramma (Hampson, 1910)
- Athetis carayoni Laporte, 1977
- Athetis castaneipars (Moore, 1882)
- Athetis cervina (Moore, 1881)
- Athetis chionephra (Hampson, 1911)
- Athetis chionopis Hampson, 1909
- Athetis cineracea Warren, 1914
- Athetis cinerascens (Motschulsky, 1860)
- Athetis cognata (Moore, 1882)
- Athetis collaris (Wallengren, 1856)
- Athetis condei Viette, 1963
- Athetis conformis (Walker, [1857])
- Athetis contorta Berio, 1976
- Athetis correpta (Püngeler, 1907)
- Athetis corticea Hampson, 1918
- Athetis costiloba Sugi, 1982
- Athetis costiplaga (Bethune-Baker, 1906)
- Athetis cristifera Berio, 1977
- Athetis cryptisirias Viette, 1958
- Athetis dallolmoi (Berio, 1974)
- Athetis delecta (Moore, 1881)
- Athetis denisi Viette, 1963
- Athetis despecta Viette, 1958
- Athetis didy Viette, 1963
- Athetis discopuncta Hampson, 1916
- Athetis dissimilis (Hampson, 1909)
- Athetis divisa (Moore, 1882)
- Athetis duplex (Janse, 1938)
- Athetis elephantula Berio, 1976
- Athetis erigida (Swinhoe, 1890)
- Athetis eupsilioides Han & Kononenko, 2011
- Athetis excurvata (Janse, 1938)
- Athetis expolita (Butler, 1876)
- Athetis externa (Walker, 1865)
- Athetis farinacea (Moore, 1888)
- Athetis fasciata (Moore, 1867)
- Athetis flacourti Viette, 1963
- Athetis flavicolor Han & Kononenko, 2011
- Athetis flavipuncta Hampson, 1909
- Athetis fontainei (Berio, 1974)
- Athetis foveata Hampson, 1909
- Athetis fragosa Viette, 1958
- Athetis fumicolor (Janse, 1938)
- Athetis funesta (Staudinger, 1888)
- Athetis furcatula Han & Kononenko, 2011
- Athetis furvula (Hübner, [1808])
- Athetis gaedei Berio, 1955
- Athetis gemini (Bethune-Baker, 1906)
- Athetis glauca (Hampson, 1902)
- Athetis glaucoides (Berio, 1960)
- Athetis glaucopis (Bethune-Baker, 1911)
- Athetis gluteosa (Treitschke, 1835)
- Athetis gonionephra Hampson, 1909
- Athetis grandidieri Viette, 1963
- Athetis griveaudi Viette, 1963
- Athetis grjebinei Viette, 1963
- Athetis heliastis Hampson, 1909
- Athetis hennia (Swinhoe, 1901)
- Athetis heringi Viette, 1963
- Athetis hoengshana Han & Kononenko, 2011
- Athetis hongkongensis Galsworthy, 1997
- Athetis hospes (Freyer, 1831)
- Athetis humberti Viette, 1963
- Athetis hyperaeschra Hampson, 1909
- Athetis ignava (Guenée, 1852)
- Athetis immixta Warren, 1914
- Athetis improbalis Berio, 1966
- Athetis inconspicua (Bethune-Baker, 1906)
- Athetis inquirenda (Strand, 1917)
- Athetis interlata (Walker, 1857)
- Athetis interstincta (Moore, 1882)
- Athetis jeanneli Viette, 1963
- Athetis lapidea Wileman, 1911
- Athetis lepigone (Möschler, 1860)
- Athetis leuconephra Hampson, 1909
- Athetis leucopis (Hampson, 1902)
- Athetis linealis Yoshimoto, 1994
- Athetis lineosa (Moore, 1881)
- Athetis lineosella Sugi, 1982
- Athetis linzhi Han & Kononenko, 2011
- Athetis longiciliata Hampson, 1909
- Athetis longidigitus Berio, 1976
- Athetis longiharpe Han & Kononenko, 2011
- Athetis longivalva Kononenko, 2005
- Athetis lyrophora Boursin, 1970
- Athetis maculatra (Lower, 1902)
- Athetis magniplagia (Hampson, 1918)
- Athetis martoni Kononenko, 2005
- Athetis melanephra Hampson, 1909
- Athetis melanerges Hampson, 1918
- Athetis melanomma Hampson, 1920
- Athetis melanopis Hampson, 1909
- Athetis melanosema Hampson, 1914
- Athetis melanosticta Hampson, 1909
- Athetis metis (Janse, 1938)
- Athetis micra (Hampson, 1902)
- Athetis microtera (Hampson, 1902)
- Athetis mienshana Kononenko, 2005
- Athetis milloti Viette, 1963
- Athetis minivalva Han & Kononenko, 2011
- Athetis morbidensis Berio, 1976
- Athetis mozambica Hampson, 1918
- Athetis multilinea Wileman & South, 1920
- Athetis mus (Hampson, 1891)
- Athetis nephrosticta Hampson, 1909
- Athetis nigra (Janse, 1938)
- Athetis nigrifons (Dognin, 1919)
- Athetis nigrilla Berio, 1976
- Athetis nitens (Saalmüller, 1891)
- Athetis nonagrica (Walker, [1863])
- Athetis obscura (Wileman & South, 1920)
- Athetis obscuroides Poole, 1989
- Athetis obtusa (Hampson, 1891)
- Athetis ocellata (Janse, 1938)
- Athetis ochracea (Hampson, 1894)
- Athetis ochreipuncta (Hampson, 1894)
- Athetis ochreosignata (Aurivillius, 1910)
- Athetis oculatissima Berio, 1955
- Athetis orthosioides Han & Kononenko, 2011
- Athetis pallescens (Janse, 1938)
- Athetis pallicornis (Felder & Rogenhofer, 1874)
- Athetis pallidipennis Sugi, 1982
- Athetis pallustris (Hübner, [1808])
- Athetis pectinatissima Berio, 1976
- Athetis pectinifer (Aurivillius, 1910)
- Athetis pellicea (Swinhoe, 1903)
- Athetis percnopis (Bethune-Baker, 1911)
- Athetis perineti Viette, 1963
- Athetis perparva Berio, 1966
- Athetis perplexa (Janse, 1938)
- Athetis pigra (Guenée, 1852)
- Athetis pilosissima Berio, 1955
- Athetis placida (Moore, [1884])
- Athetis plumbescens Wileman & West, 1929
- Athetis poliophaea Hampson, 1911
- Athetis poliostrota Hampson, 1909
- Athetis postdentata (Berio, 1960)
- Athetis postpuncta Holloway, 1979
- Athetis praetexta (Swinhoe, 1905)
- Athetis prochaskai Viette, 1963
- Athetis pseudofunesta Kononenko, 2005
- Athetis pseudolineosa Yoshimoto, 1992
- Athetis pulvisculum Berio, 1976
- Athetis radama Viette, 1961
- Athetis reclusa (Walker, 1862)
- Athetis rectilinea (Hampson, 1910)
- Athetis renalis (Moore, [1884])
- Athetis reniflava (Berio, 1960)
- Athetis restricta (Janse, 1938)
- Athetis rionegrensis (Chiarelli de Gahn, 1949)
- Athetis roastis Hampson, 1918
- Athetis robertsi (Janse, 1938)
- Athetis rufipuncta (Hampson, 1902)
- Athetis rufistigma Warren, 1914
- Athetis satellitia (Hampson, 1902)
- Athetis scopsis Berio, 1976
- Athetis scotopis (Bethune-Baker, 1911)
- Athetis seyrigi Viette, 1963
- Athetis sicaria Viette, 1958
- Athetis siccata Viette, 1958
- Athetis signata (Janse, 1938)
- Athetis simplex Han & Kononenko, 2011
- Athetis sincera (Swinhoe, 1889)
- Athetis singula (Möschler, 1883)
- Athetis sinistra Berio, 1976
- Athetis smintha (Hampson, 1902)
- Athetis sobria Berio, 1955
- Athetis spaelotidia (Butler, 1879)
- Athetis stellata (Moore, 1882)
- Athetis stellatula Chang, 1991
- Athetis striolata (Butler, 1886)
- Athetis stygia Hampson, 1909
- Athetis subpartita (Bethune-Baker, 1906)
- Athetis suffusa Yoshimoto, 1994
- Athetis tarda (Guenée, 1852)
- Athetis tenuis (Butler, 1886)
- Athetis terminata (Hampson, 1898)
- Athetis tetraglypha Berio, 1939
- Athetis thoracica (Moore, [1884])
- Athetis tornipuncta Berio, 1976
- Athetis transvalensis (Janse, 1938)
- Athetis transversa (Walker, 1858)
- Athetis transversistriata Strand, 1911
- Athetis triangulata Wileman & West, 1929
- Athetis tridentata Han & Kononenko, 2011
- Athetis trixysta Viette, 1958
- Athetis unduloma Strand, 1920
- Athetis variana (Swinhoe, 1886)
- Athetis vernalis Yoshimoto, 1994
- Athetis v-parum (Kozhantschikov, 1923)
- Athetis xantholopha (Hampson, 1902)
- Athetis zelopha Viette, 1963
- Athetis zombitsy Viette, 1963

== Former species ==
- Athetis miranda is now Proxenus miranda (Grote, 1873)
- Athetis mindara is now Proxenus mindara (Barnes & McDunnough, 1913)
- Athetis mendosa is now Proxenus mendosa (McDunnough, 1927)
