= Athetis hongkongensis =

Hong Kong marsh moth

Scientific classification
- Kingdom: Animalia
- Phylum: Arthropoda
- Clade: Pancrustacea
- Class: Insecta
- Order: Lepidoptera
- Superfamily: Noctuoidea
- Family: Noctuidae
- Genus: Athetis
- Species: A. hongkongensis

Binomial name
- Athetis hongkongensis Galsworthy, 1997

Species of moth

Athetis hongkongensis, the Hong Kong marsh moth is a noctuid moth found in Hong Kong. The species was first described by Anthony Galsworthy in 1997.

== Description ==
The original description (Galsworthy, 1997: 139) compares A. hongkongensis to Athetis lineosa and other species in the species complex, as follows: "Smaller than lineosa, with the hindwings less intense brown; forewing outer line in lineosa is smoothly curved from costa to dorsum, whereas in hongkongensis there is an obtuse angle close to the costa, and a further angle at about two thirds, where the line turns slightly towards the point of the wing, meeting the dorsum almost at a right angle."

== Range ==
So far as is known, A. hongkongensis is restricted to, though widespread within, Hong Kong, and thus regarded to be of "least concern" (as of 2014) with regard to conservation status, even though it meets IUCN Red List geographic criteria for endangered (EN) - EOO less than 500 km^{2}, AOO = 64 km^{2} as calculated using iNaturalist observations imported to GeoCat.

== Habitat ==
Observations of Athetis hongkongensis occur in secondary forest and on urban fringes between 30 m and 675 m elevation.

== Ecology ==
Early stages (egg, larva, pupa) are unknown. Kendrick (2002) gives the adult phenology as "Recorded from February to November, peaking in April and October."

== Etymology ==
Athetis hongkongensis is named for the type locality, Hong Kong. The vernacular is derived with reference to the Palaearctic species Athetis pallustris, known as the marsh moth in the United Kingdom, and reference to the type locality.

== Classification of Athetis ==
Athetis is placed in the subtribe Athetiina, of Caradrinini, in Noctuinae, by Holloway (2011), and also in Kononenko & Pinratana (2013), which were both based on (developed in parallel with) the molecular review of Noctuidae by Zahiri et al. (2013). The American list (see Results paras 11 & 12 of Lafontaine & Schmidt (2013)) and the Fauna Europaea listing for Athetis both now follow this arrangement.

== See also ==
- Species first discovered in Hong Kong
