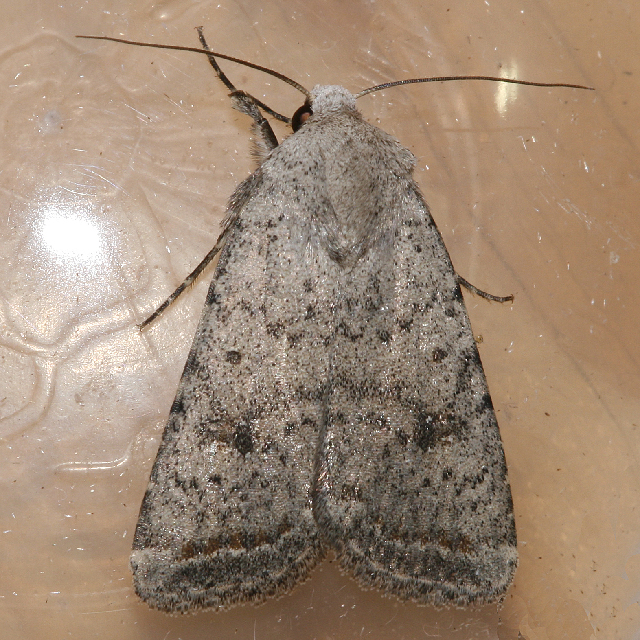
- Caradrina montana

Scientific classification
- Kingdom: Animalia
- Phylum: Arthropoda
- Clade: Pancrustacea
- Class: Insecta
- Order: Lepidoptera
- Superfamily: Noctuoidea
- Family: Noctuidae
- Subfamily: Noctuinae
- Tribe: Caradrinini

Genera
- See text

= Caradrinini =

Tribe of moths

The Caradrinini are a mid-sized tribe of moths in the family Noctuidae.

== Genera ==
- Andropolia Grote, 1895
- Athetis Hübner, 1821
- Bellura Walker, 1865
- Callopistria Hübner, 1821
- Caradrina
- Conservula Grote, 1874
- Elaphria Hübner, 1818
- Enargia Hübner, 1821
- Euherrichia Grote, 1882
- Euplexia Stephens, 1829
- Hoplodrina
- Hyppa Duponchel, 1845
- Ipimorpha Hübner, 1821
- Nedra Clarke, 1940
- Paradrina
- Phlogophora Treitschke, 1825
- Platyperigea Smith, 1894
- Proxenus
- Spodoptera Guenée, 1852
