= Protoperigea posticata =

Scientific classification
- Domain: Eukaryota
- Kingdom: Animalia
- Phylum: Arthropoda
- Class: Insecta
- Order: Lepidoptera
- Superfamily: Noctuoidea
- Family: Noctuidae
- Tribe: Caradrinini
- Subtribe: Caradrinina
- Genus: Protoperigea
- Species: P. posticata

Binomial name
- Protoperigea posticata (Harvey, 1875)

Species of moth

Protoperigea posticata is a species of cutworm or dart moth in the family Noctuidae. It is found in North America.

The MONA or Hodges number for Protoperigea posticata is 9643.
