= Protoperigea umbricata =

Scientific classification
- Domain: Eukaryota
- Kingdom: Animalia
- Phylum: Arthropoda
- Class: Insecta
- Order: Lepidoptera
- Superfamily: Noctuoidea
- Family: Noctuidae
- Tribe: Caradrinini
- Subtribe: Caradrinina
- Genus: Protoperigea
- Species: P. umbricata

Binomial name
- Protoperigea umbricata Mustelin, 2006

Species of moth

Protoperigea umbricata is a species of cutworm or dart moth in the family Noctuidae. It is found in North America.

The MONA or Hodges number for Protoperigea umbricata is 9643.1.
