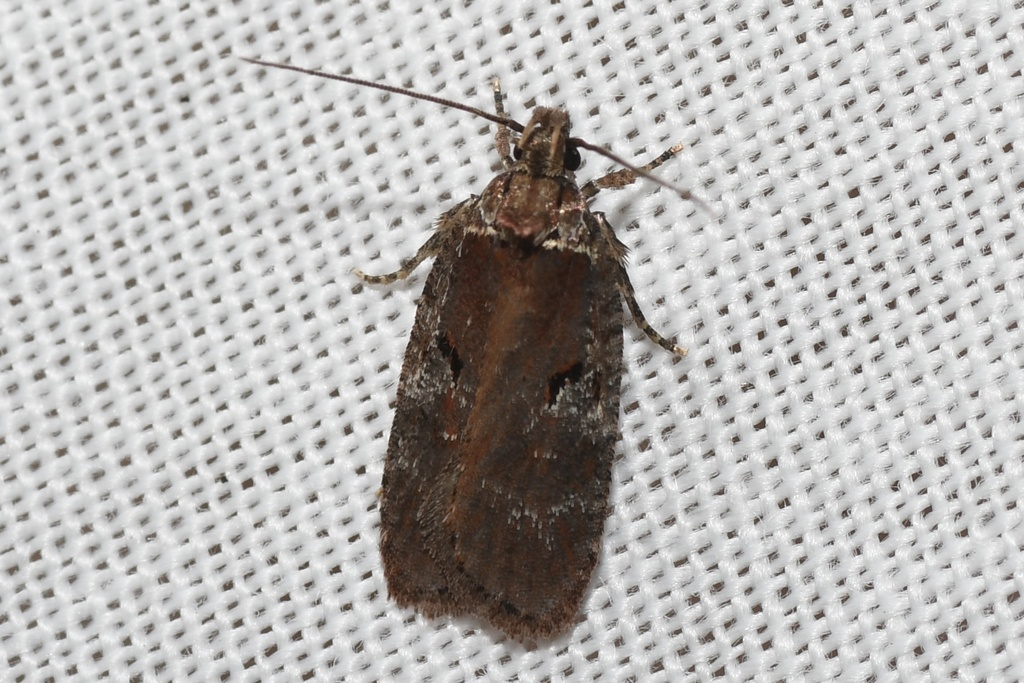

Scientific classification
- Kingdom: Animalia
- Phylum: Arthropoda
- Clade: Pancrustacea
- Class: Insecta
- Order: Lepidoptera
- Family: Depressariidae
- Genus: Agonopterix
- Species: A. lythrella

Binomial name
- Agonopterix lythrella (Walsingham, 1889)

Synonyms
- Depressaria lythrella Walsingham, 1889; Agonopterix arcuella Clarke, 1941

= Agonopterix lythrella =

Species of moth

Agonopterix lythrella is a moth in the family Depressariidae. It was described by Thomas de Grey in 1889. It is found in North America, where it has been recorded from Illinois, Maine, Maryland, Massachusetts, Michigan, Minnesota, New Brunswick, New Hampshire, New York, North Carolina, Nova Scotia, Ohio, Ontario and Saskatchewan.

The wingspan is about 15 mm. The forewings are tawny-reddish, dusted with fuscous and pale cinereous towards the costa. There is a pale cinereous basal patch with a distinct spot on its lower half. There is also a curved black spot before the middle of the wing, edged with reddish and followed by cinereous scales. The hindwings are brownish-grey.

The larvae feed on Lythrum alatum, Hypericum punctatum and Hypericum virginicum.
