= Anorthodes =

Scientific classification
- Domain: Eukaryota
- Kingdom: Animalia
- Phylum: Arthropoda
- Class: Insecta
- Order: Lepidoptera
- Superfamily: Noctuoidea
- Family: Noctuidae
- Subtribe: Athetiina
- Genus: Anorthodes; Smith, 1891

Genus of moths

Anorthodes is a genus of moths of the family Noctuidae.

== Species ==
- Anorthodes indigena (Barnes & Benjamin, 1925)
- Anorthodes triquetra (Grote, 1883)

== Former species ==
- Anorthodes tarda is now Athetis tarda (Guenée, 1852)
