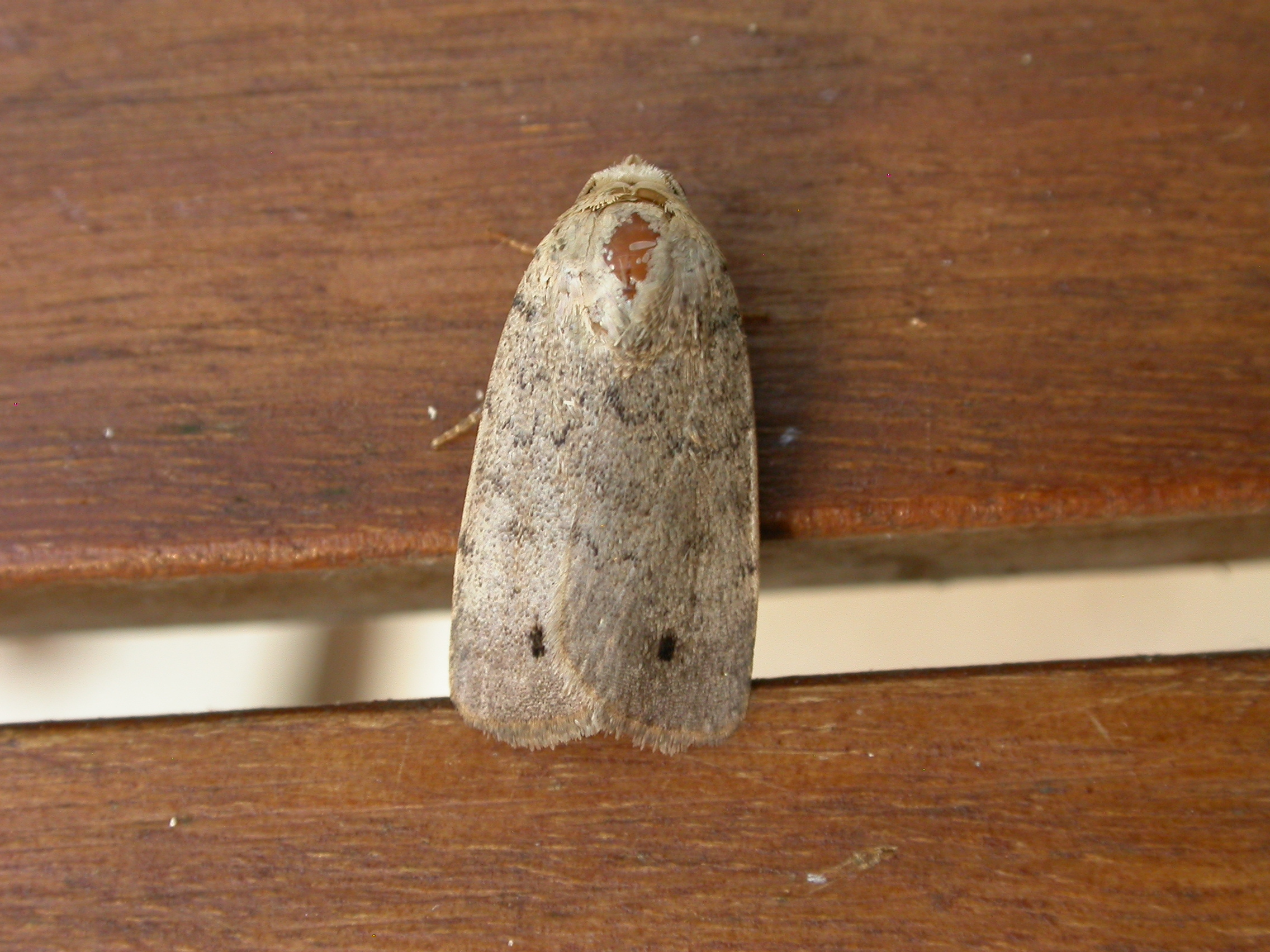

Scientific classification
- Domain: Eukaryota
- Kingdom: Animalia
- Phylum: Arthropoda
- Class: Insecta
- Order: Lepidoptera
- Superfamily: Noctuoidea
- Family: Noctuidae
- Genus: Athetis
- Species: A. maculatra

Binomial name
- Athetis maculatra (Lower, 1902)

Synonyms
- Caradrina maculatra Lower, 1902; Elydna notanda Warren, 1913

= Athetis maculatra =

Species of moth

Athetis maculatra is a species of moth of the family Noctuidae. It is found in Australia (New South Wales, the Northern Territory, Queensland and Western Australia).

The wingspan is about 25 mm. The forewings are speckled pale brown with a dark brown mark near the middle of the margin.
