= Anorthodes indigena =

Scientific classification
- Kingdom: Animalia
- Phylum: Arthropoda
- Clade: Pancrustacea
- Class: Insecta
- Order: Lepidoptera
- Superfamily: Noctuoidea
- Family: Noctuidae
- Genus: Anorthodes
- Species: A. indigena

Binomial name
- Anorthodes indigena (Barnes & Benjamin, 1925)

Species of moth

Anorthodes indigena is a species of cutworm or dart moth in the family Noctuidae. It was first described by William Barnes and Foster Hendrickson Benjamin in 1925. It is found in North America.
