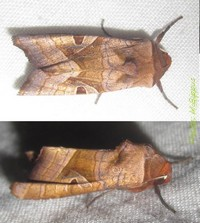

Scientific classification
- Kingdom: Animalia
- Phylum: Arthropoda
- Class: Insecta
- Order: Lepidoptera
- Superfamily: Noctuoidea
- Family: Noctuidae
- Genus: Conservula
- Species: C. cinisigna

Binomial name
- Conservula cinisigna de Joannis, 1906

Synonyms
- Appana cinisigna

= Conservula cinisigna =

Species of moth

Conservula cinisigna is a moth of the family Noctuidae. It is found in Africa south of the Sahara.

Its length is approximately 20 millimetres (0.79 in), with wing length of 17–18 mm (0.67–0.71 in).
