= Nedra goniosema =

Scientific classification
- Kingdom: Animalia
- Phylum: Arthropoda
- Class: Insecta
- Order: Lepidoptera
- Superfamily: Noctuoidea
- Family: Noctuidae
- Genus: Nedra
- Species: N. goniosema

Binomial name
- Nedra goniosema (Hampson, 1909)

Synonyms
- Delta goniosema Hampson, 1909

Species of moth

Nedra goniosema is a moth in the family Noctuidae. It is found in Mexico.
