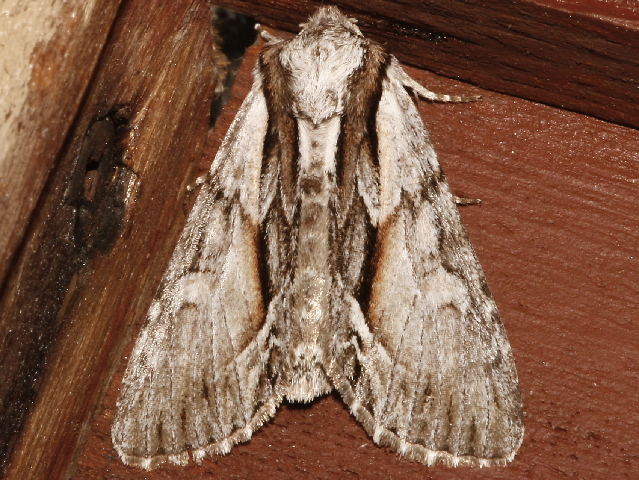

Scientific classification
- Kingdom: Animalia
- Phylum: Arthropoda
- Clade: Pancrustacea
- Class: Insecta
- Order: Lepidoptera
- Superfamily: Noctuoidea
- Family: Noctuidae
- Tribe: Xylenini
- Subtribe: Xylenina
- Genus: Hyppa
- Species: H. contrasta

Binomial name
- Hyppa contrasta McDunnough, 1946

= Hyppa contrasta =

Species of moth

Hyppa contrasta, known generally as the summer hyppa moth or Russian mustard moth, is a species of cutworm or dart moth in the family Noctuidae. It is found in North America.

The MONA or Hodges number for Hyppa contrasta is 9579.
