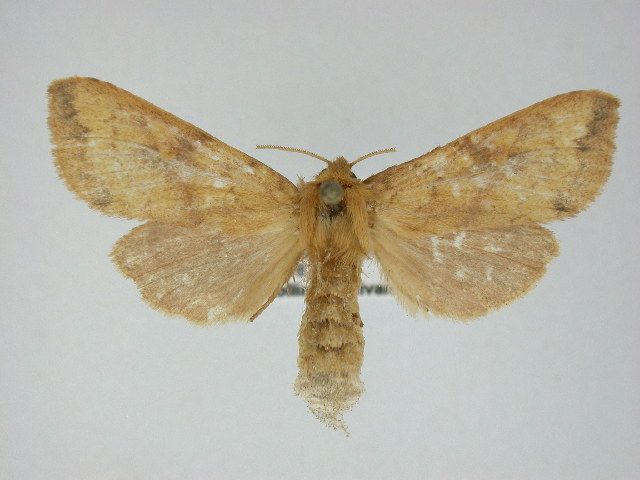

Scientific classification
- Kingdom: Animalia
- Phylum: Arthropoda
- Class: Insecta
- Order: Lepidoptera
- Superfamily: Noctuoidea
- Family: Noctuidae
- Tribe: Arzamini
- Genus: Bellura
- Species: B. gortynoides

Binomial name
- Bellura gortynoides Walker, 1865

= Bellura gortynoides =

Species of moth

Bellura gortynoides, the white-tailed diver, is a species of cutworm or dart moth in the family Noctuidae. It is found in North America.

The MONA or Hodges number for Bellura gortynoides is 9523.
