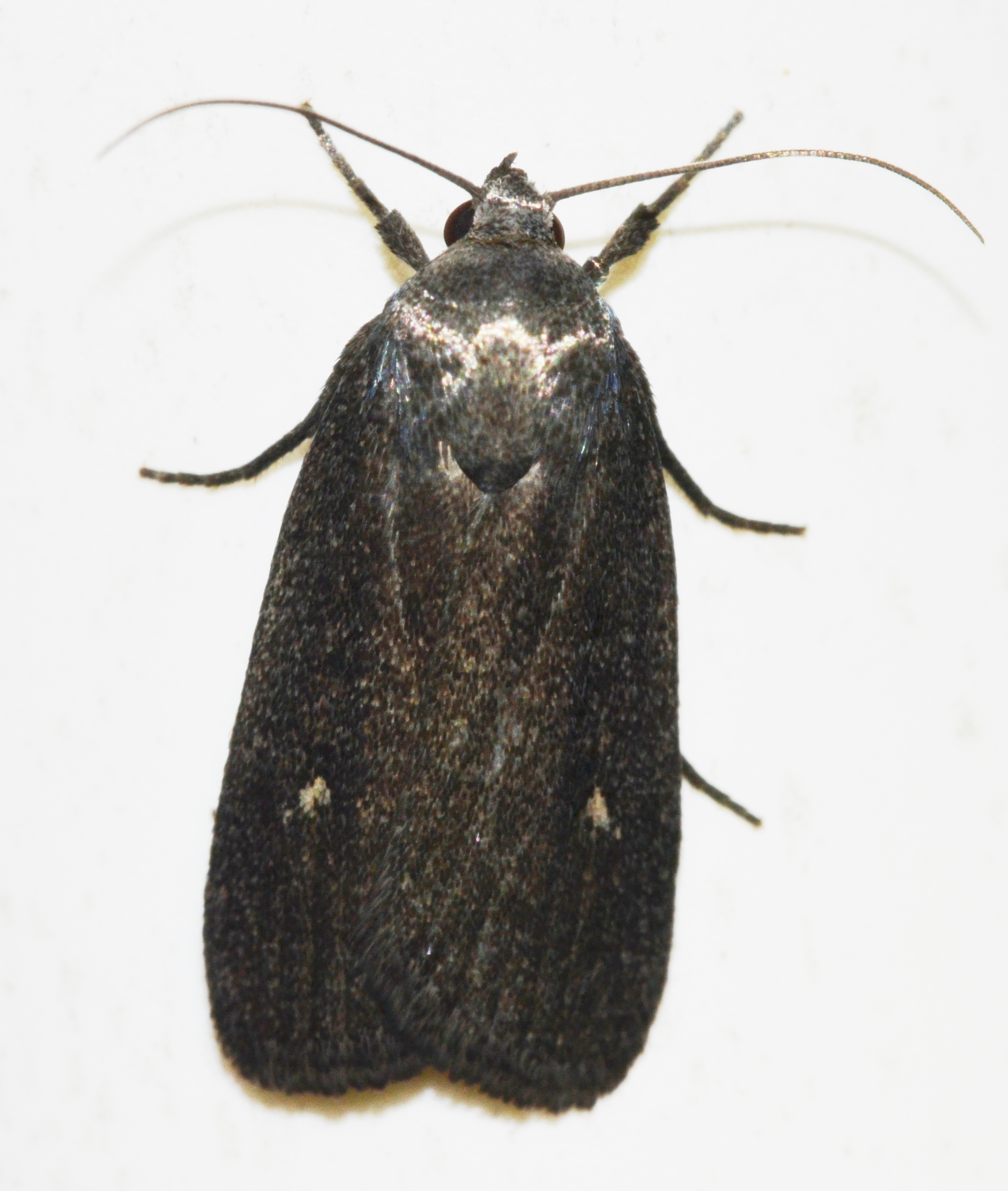
- Proxenus miranda

Scientific classification
- Kingdom: Animalia
- Phylum: Arthropoda
- Clade: Pancrustacea
- Class: Insecta
- Order: Lepidoptera
- Superfamily: Noctuoidea
- Family: Noctuidae
- Subtribe: Athetiina
- Genus: Proxenus; Herrich-Schäffer, 1850

= Proxenus (moth) =

Genus of moths

Proxenus is a genus of moths of the family Noctuidae erected by Gottlieb August Wilhelm Herrich-Schäffer in 1850. The genus was included within Athetis by Robert W. Poole in 1989, but re-instated by Lafontaine & Schmidt in 2010, with followup comments in 2013.

== Selected species ==
- Proxenus hospes (Freyer, 1831)
- Proxenus mendosa (McDunnough, 1927)
- Proxenus mindara (Barnes & McDunnough, 1913)
- Proxenus miranda (Grote, 1873)
