= Protoperigea =

Scientific classification
- Kingdom: Animalia
- Phylum: Arthropoda
- Class: Insecta
- Order: Lepidoptera
- Superfamily: Noctuoidea
- Family: Noctuidae
- Subtribe: Caradrinina
- Genus: Protoperigea; McDunnough, 1937

Genus of moths

Protoperigea is a genus of moths of the family Noctuidae.

== Species ==
- Protoperigea anotha (Dyar, 1904)
- Protoperigea calientensis Mustelin, 2006
- Protoperigea parvulata Mustelin, 2006
- Protoperigea posticata (Harvey, 1875)
- Protoperigea subterminata Mustelin, 2006
- Protoperigea umbricata Mustelin, 2006
