= Anorthodes triquetra =

Scientific classification
- Kingdom: Animalia
- Phylum: Arthropoda
- Class: Insecta
- Order: Lepidoptera
- Superfamily: Noctuoidea
- Family: Noctuidae
- Genus: Anorthodes
- Species: A. triquetra

Binomial name
- Anorthodes triquetra (Grote, 1883)

Species of moth

Anorthodes triquetra is a species of cutworm or dart moth in the family Noctuidae. It is found in North America.

The MONA or Hodges number for Anorthodes triquetra is 9651.
