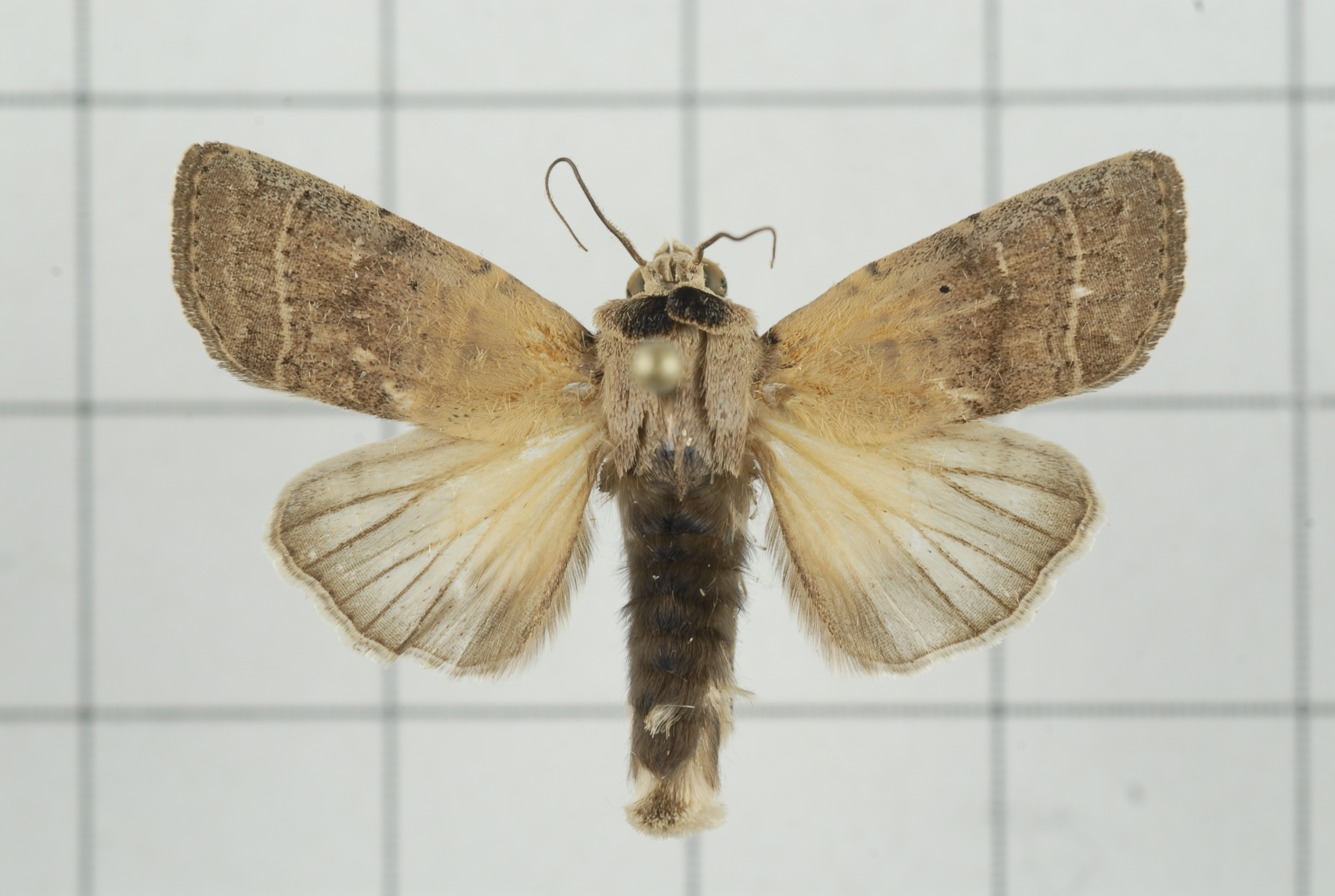

Scientific classification
- Domain: Eukaryota
- Kingdom: Animalia
- Phylum: Arthropoda
- Class: Insecta
- Order: Lepidoptera
- Superfamily: Noctuoidea
- Family: Noctuidae
- Genus: Athetis
- Species: A. thoracica

Binomial name
- Athetis thoracica (Moore, 1884)

Synonyms
- Radinacra thoracica Moore, 1884; Leucocosmia ceres Butler, 1886; Caradrina euthusa Hampson, 1891; Caradrina heliarcha Meyrick, 1897; Caradrina unipunctata Bethune-Baker, 1906; Leucocosmia nonagrica Walker auct. (Zimmerman, 1958; Robinson, 1975; Holloway, 1979)

= Athetis thoracica =

Species of moth

Athetis thoracica is a moth of the family Noctuidae. It is found all over the Indo-Australian and Pacific tropics. It was first recorded from Hawaii in the early 1900s. It is believed to have been accidentally introduced from Fiji. It is now present on Kauai, Oahu, Molokai, Maui and Hawaii.

Larvae have been recorded on Commelina, Ipomoea, Syzygium, Portulaca, Nicotiana, Camellia and unspecified Gramineae and Leguminosae species.

The pupa is formed in the soil, just below the surface. It is 13–15 mm long and uniform medium brown. The pupal period lasts for 12 to 14 days.

== Taxonomy ==
The name Athetis nonagrica has been applied consistently to specimens that are in fact the more widespread species Athetis thoracica.
