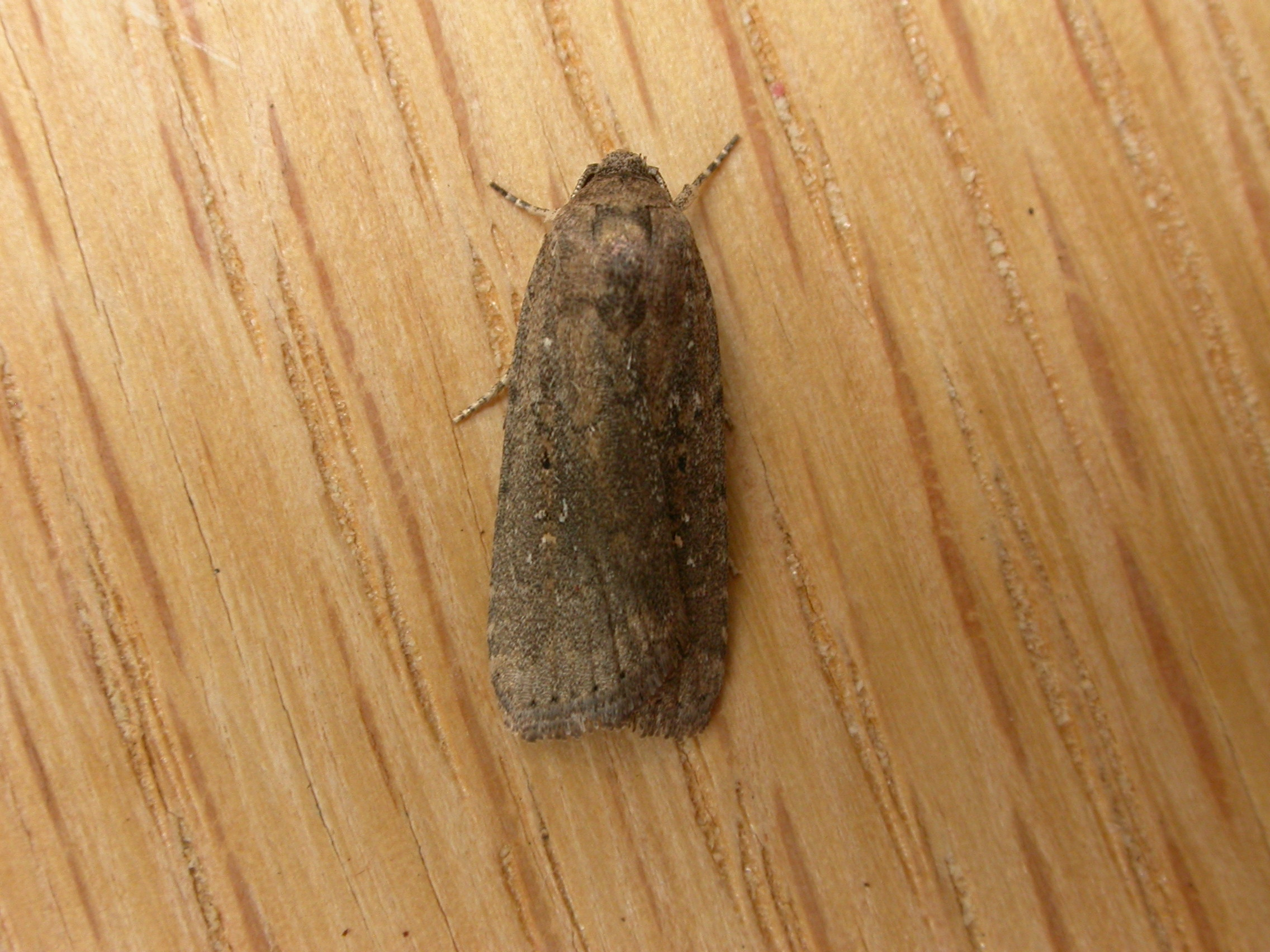

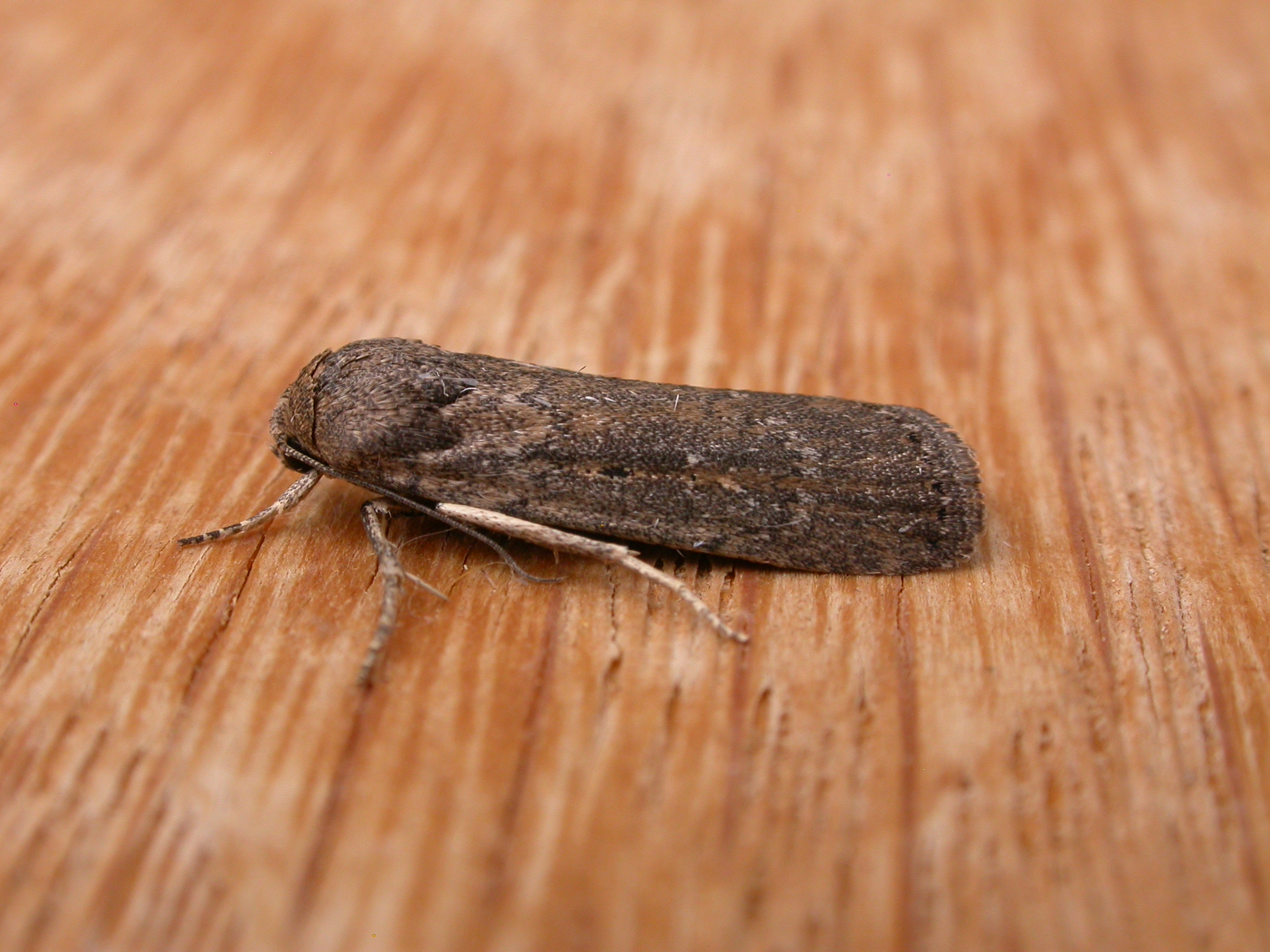

Scientific classification
- Domain: Eukaryota
- Kingdom: Animalia
- Phylum: Arthropoda
- Class: Insecta
- Order: Lepidoptera
- Superfamily: Noctuoidea
- Family: Noctuidae
- Genus: Athetis
- Species: A. tenuis

Binomial name
- Athetis tenuis (Butler, 1886)

Synonyms
- Radinogoes tenuis Butler, 1886

= Athetis tenuis =

Species of moth

Athetis tenuis is a moth of the family Noctuidae. It is known from all of Australia, including Norfolk Island as well as New Zealand.

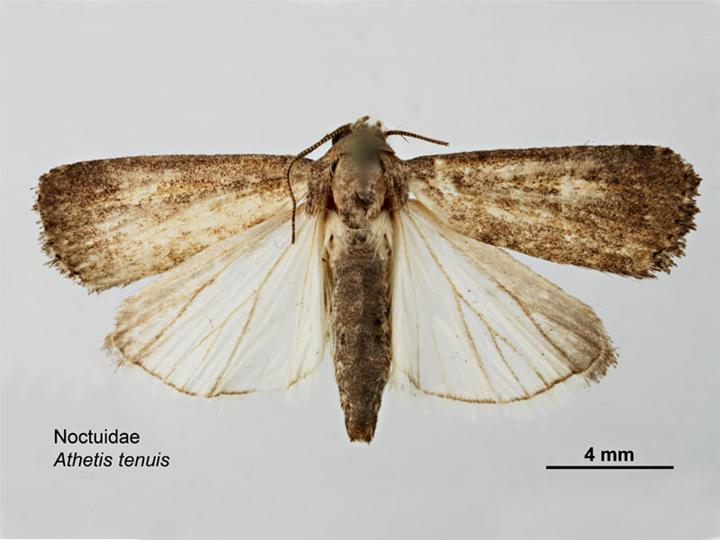
Dorsal view

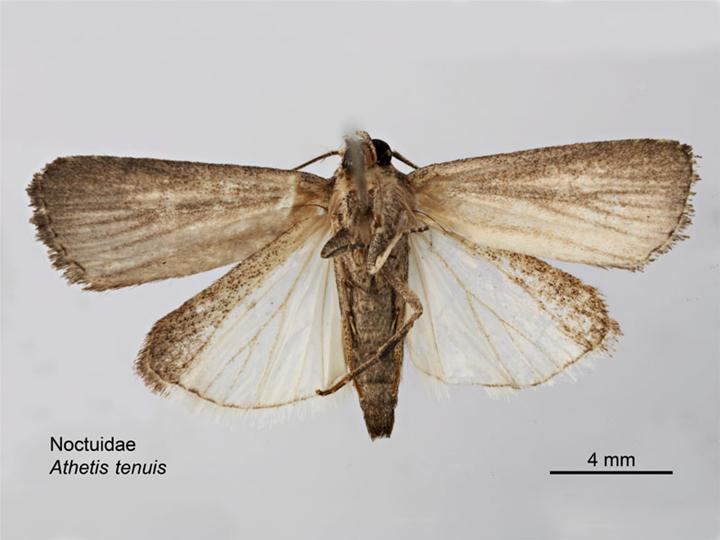
Ventral view

The larvae have been recorded feeding on the stems of young Gossypium species.

== Taxonomy ==
Athetix tenuis was first described by Arthur Gardiner Butler in 1886 as Radinogoes tenuis from specimens collected at Peak Downs and Rockhampton in Queensland.
