= Proxenus mendosa =

Scientific classification
- Domain: Eukaryota
- Kingdom: Animalia
- Phylum: Arthropoda
- Class: Insecta
- Order: Lepidoptera
- Superfamily: Noctuoidea
- Family: Noctuidae
- Tribe: Caradrinini
- Subtribe: Athetiina
- Genus: Proxenus
- Species: P. mendosa

Binomial name
- Proxenus mendosa McDunnough, 1927

Species of moth

Proxenus mendosa is a species of cutworm or dart moth in the family Noctuidae. It is found in North America.

The MONA or Hodges number for Proxenus mendosa is 9649.
