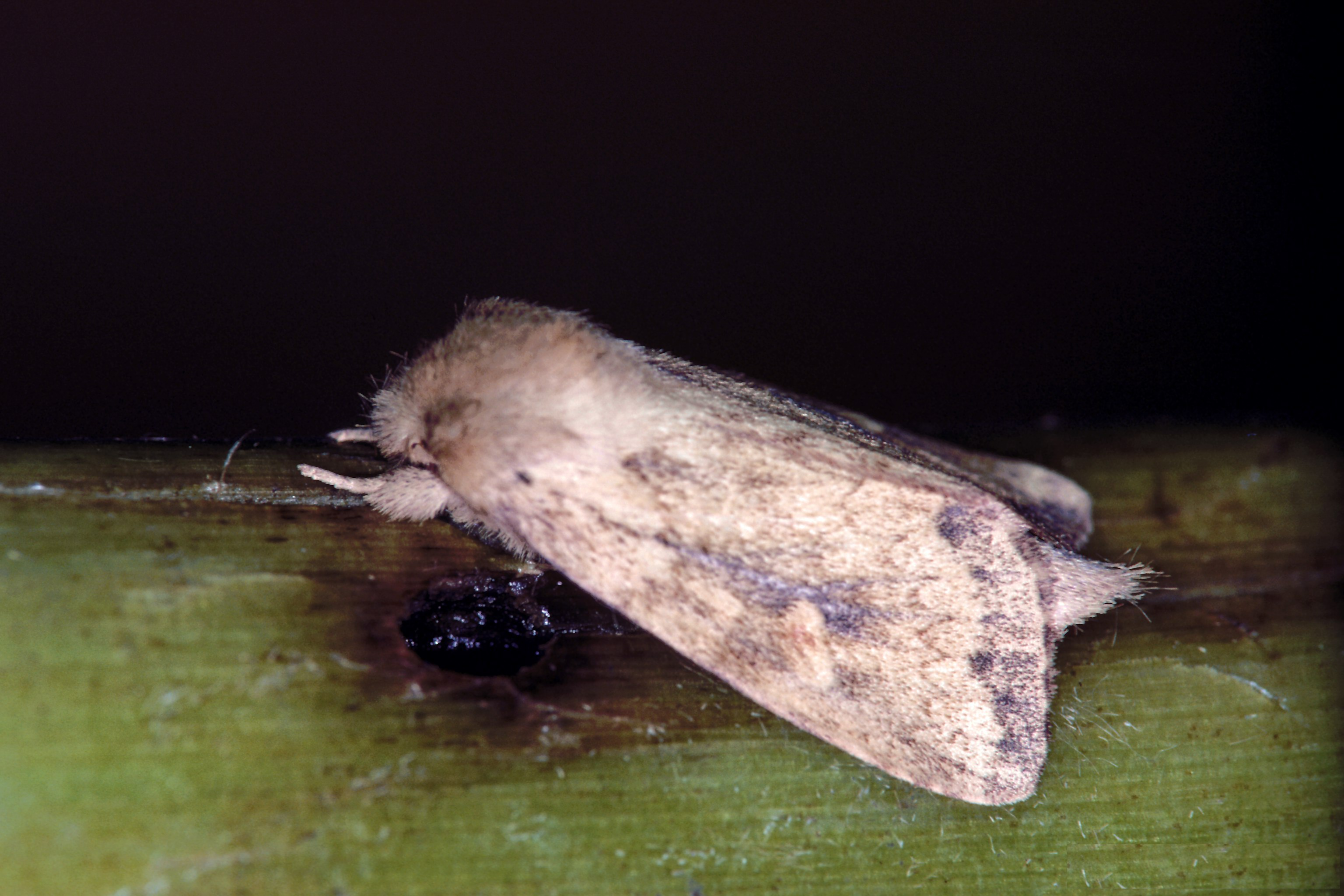

Conservation status
- Secure (NatureServe)

Scientific classification
- Kingdom: Animalia
- Phylum: Arthropoda
- Class: Insecta
- Order: Lepidoptera
- Superfamily: Noctuoidea
- Family: Noctuidae
- Genus: Bellura
- Species: B. densa

Binomial name
- Bellura densa (Walker, 1865)

Synonyms
- Arzama densa Walker, 1865; Sphida oecogenes Dyar, 1913

= Bellura densa =

Pickerelweed borer moth

Species of moth

Bellura densa, the pickerelweed borer moth, is a species of moth of the family Noctuidae. It is found from Maryland to southern Florida, west to Indiana and Louisiana.

The wingspan is 35–50 millimetres (1.4–2.0 in).

The larvae feed on various wetland plants, including Typha, Pontederia and Eichhornia species.
