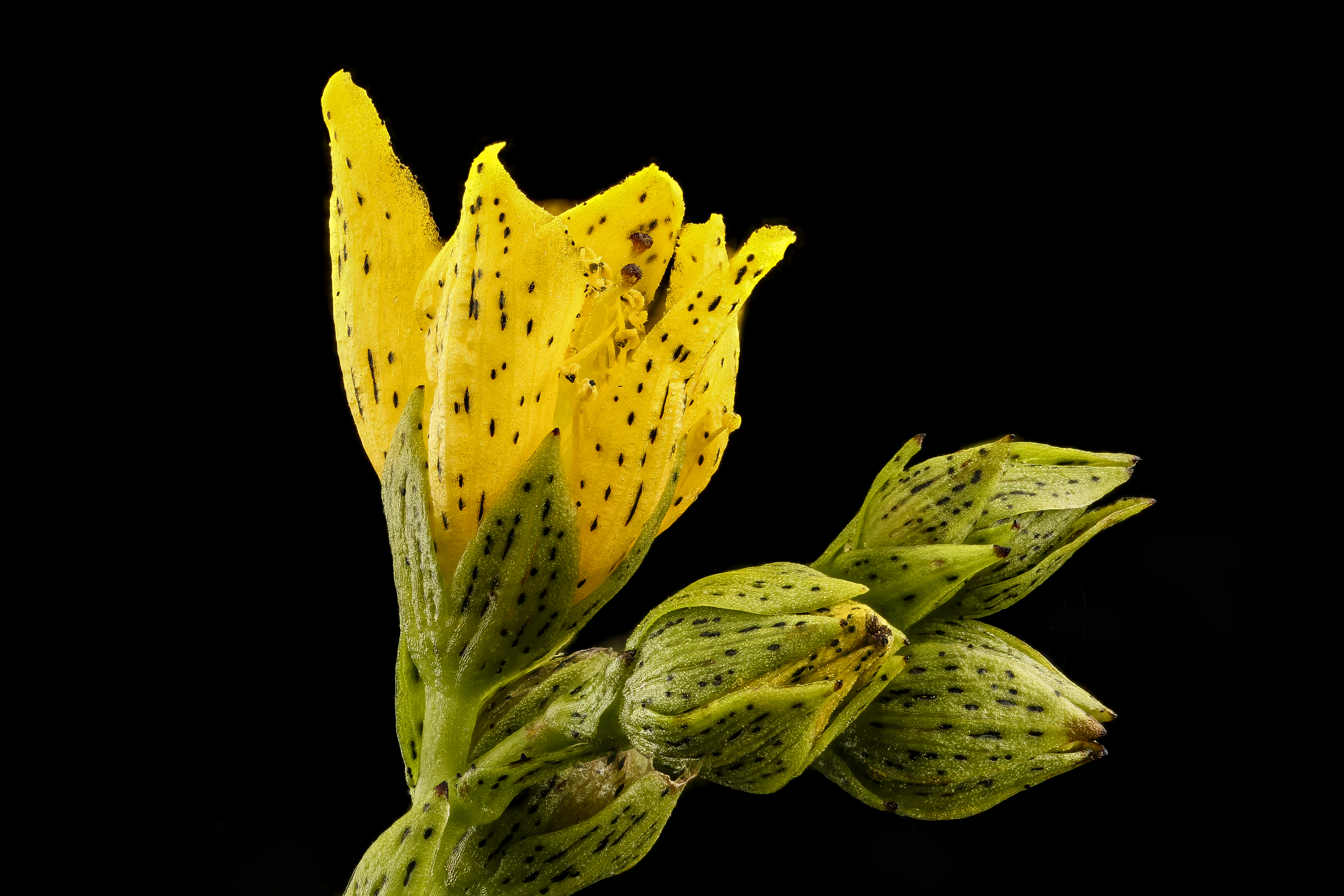

Scientific classification
- Kingdom: Plantae
- Clade: Tracheophytes
- Clade: Angiosperms
- Clade: Eudicots
- Clade: Rosids
- Order: Malpighiales
- Family: Hypericaceae
- Genus: Hypericum
- Section: Hypericum sect. Graveolentia
- Species: H. punctatum

Binomial name
- Hypericum punctatum Lam.1796

Synonyms
- H. corymbosum Mühlenb. ex Willd.; H. maculatum Walter; H. micranthum Choisy; H. subpetiolatum (E.P.Bicknell) Small

= Hypericum punctatum =

Species of flowering plant

Hypericum punctatum, the spotted St. John's wort, is a perennial herb native to North America. The yellow-flowered herb occurs throughout eastern North America into southern Canada. The process of microsporogenesis carried out by this plant is prone to errors in chromosomal segregation. It has a diploid number of 14 or 16. Insects are attracted to the plant's pollen and the hypericin in the plant's leaves is toxic to mammals.

== Etymology ==
The species is commonly called spotted St. John's wort because of the dark spots on its petals that distinguish it from other species of Hypericum. St. John's wort refers to the species of this genus as a whole. H. punctatum is referred to as punktiertes Johanniskraut in German. The specific epithet punctatum is Latin, meaning "dotted", referring to the many black dots on the leaves and flowers.

== Taxonomy ==
The species was first described in 1796 by Jean-Baptiste Lamarck. It is most closely related to H. formosum, which is found in western North America. It is also very closely related to H. pseudomaculatum aside from a few characteristics. H. punctatum is suspected to be the parent of the hybrid H. × mitchellianum alongside H. graveolens.

== Description ==
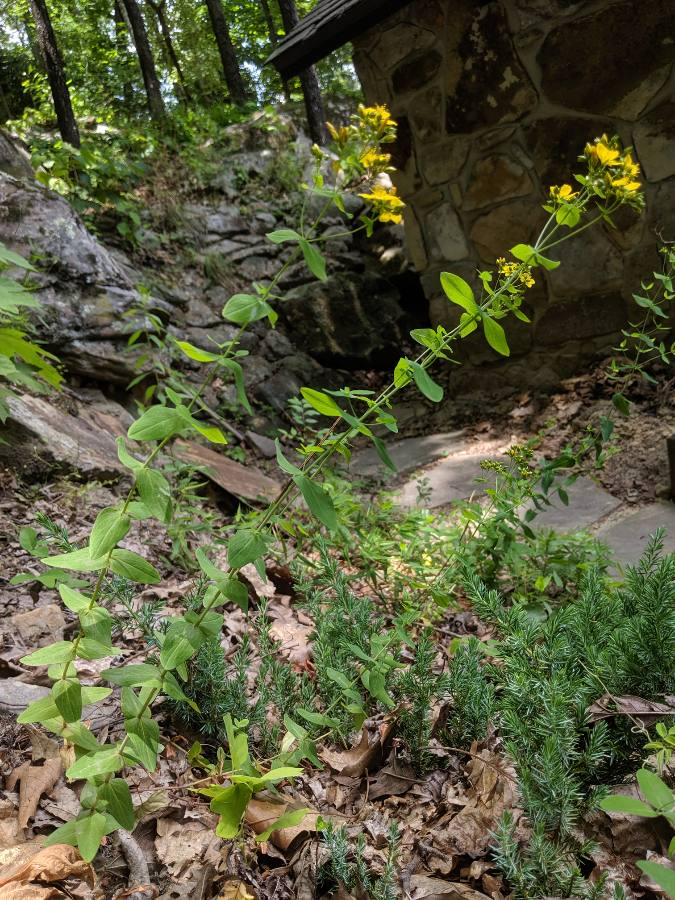
Erect stems of H. punctatum

Hypericum punctatum is seldom branched and grows to 50–100 cm (20–39 in) in height. Each of the one to several reddish, spotted stems are woody, especially near their base, and are terete. Old stems typically persist through subsequent seasons. The stems arise from a curved or twisted root crown. The root system consists of a branching taproot and several short rhizomes from which vegetative colonies of the herb can grow. The leaves of the herb are 2–6 cm (0.79–2.36 in) long and are situated opposite on the glabrous stem, either sessile or with very short petioles. The leaves vary in shape from oblong to elliptic or ovate, have rounded points at their apex, and taper towards their base. The inflorescence is composed of a corymbiform cluster of terminal cymes crowded with many yellow flowers that measure 0.8–1.5 cm (0.31–0.59 in) in width. The flowers are star-like in shape and have five petals. The sepals and petals are spotted with dark dots, especially on their underside, with the petals about twice as long as the oblong and acute sepals. The petals are dichotomously veined and have black bands between the veins. Each flower has twenty stamens or more. These numerous stamens are situated in three principal bundles and vary in filament length. Both the stamens and filaments are yellows, though filaments can occasionally become purple with age. In the center of the flower a flask-like pistil is surrounded by many yellow anthers. The anthers are about 0.5 mm (0.020 in) in diameter and have divergent yellow thecae and purplish black connective. The sessile, ovate pistil in 1.3–4 mm (0.051–0.157 in) long and has three carpels and three locules. The pistil is lined with elongate oil vesicles. The three styles are about half the length of the ovary. The stigmas are capitate. The capsule is ovoid and 0.4–0.6 cm (0.16–0.24 in) long.

H. punctatum has previously been mistaken for H. pseudomaculatum, but the two species can be distinguished by the length of their styles and the colors of their anther glands, being black in H. punctatum and translucent or amber in H. pseudomaculatum. H. punctatum somewhat resembles Hypericum perforatum as well, but the distinct corymb of H. punctatum and its heavily dotted petals distinguish the two species.

The herb flowers from July to August. It fruits from early September to October.

Microsporogenesis of H. punctatum is abnormal in many ways. Rather than pair at diakinesis the chromosomes link together in a chain and during the first metaphase the chromosomes tend to separate and alternate members move to opposite poles. Irregularities often occur such that at second metaphase the haploid number is seven or nine rather than the usual eight for the species. During the first division, chromosomes may lag behind and become lost from the spindle apparatus. Extra nuclei are occasionally formed during meiosis. During the second division the extra chromosomes tend to form their own spindle apparatus and divide. Megasporogenesis is similar to microsporogenesis in the tendency to form chains and in the alternation of chromosomes in the first metaphase.

== Habitat and distribution ==
Hypericum punctatum is common in floodplains, roadsides, moist fields, and thickets. It prefers altitudes between 50–1,200 m (160–3,940 ft).

It can be found throughout the American Midwest and the Atlantic coast and into Canada in Nova Scotia, Ontario, and Quebec. It can also be found growing wild in Sweden.

== Ecology ==
The herb is valuable to bees, attracting many types, including the American bumblebee and sweat bees. Though they pollinate to a lesser extent, beetles and hoverflies also visit the flowers. Flowers do not produce nectar, instead the insects are attracted by the pollen. Gray hairstreak caterpillars feed on the seed capsules and gray half-spot caterpillars feed on the leaves. Though insects eat the plant, foraging mammals seldom feed on the foliage as leaves contain hypericin which, in mammals, can blister skin and irritate the digestive tract.
