= Hyppa brunneicrista =

Scientific classification
- Domain: Eukaryota
- Kingdom: Animalia
- Phylum: Arthropoda
- Class: Insecta
- Order: Lepidoptera
- Superfamily: Noctuoidea
- Family: Noctuidae
- Tribe: Xylenini
- Subtribe: Xylenina
- Genus: Hyppa
- Species: H. brunneicrista

Binomial name
- Hyppa brunneicrista Smith, 1902

Species of moth

Hyppa brunneicrista is a species of cutworm or dart moth in the family Noctuidae. It is found in North America.

The MONA or Hodges number for Hyppa brunneicrista is 9580.
