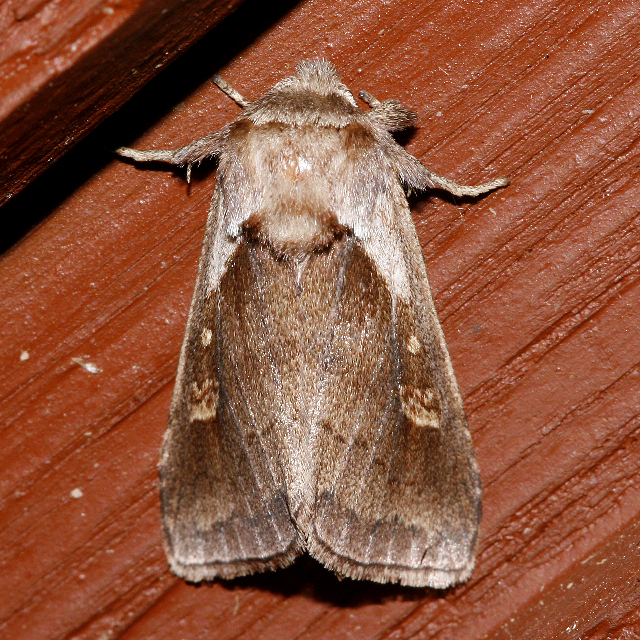

Scientific classification
- Kingdom: Animalia
- Phylum: Arthropoda
- Class: Insecta
- Order: Lepidoptera
- Superfamily: Noctuoidea
- Family: Noctuidae
- Genus: Bellura
- Species: B. obliqua

Binomial name
- Bellura obliqua (Walker, 1865)

Synonyms
- Bellura obliqua gargantua (Dyar, 1913); Bellura obliqua pallida (Barnes & Benjamin, 1924)

= Bellura obliqua =

Species of moth

Bellura obliqua, the cattail borer, is a species of cutworm or dart moth in the family Noctuidae. It was first described by Francis Walker in 1865 and it is found in North America.
