= Conservula anodonta =

Scientific classification
- Kingdom: Animalia
- Phylum: Arthropoda
- Clade: Pancrustacea
- Class: Insecta
- Order: Lepidoptera
- Superfamily: Noctuoidea
- Family: Noctuidae
- Genus: Conservula
- Species: C. anodonta

Binomial name
- Conservula anodonta (Guenée, 1852)

Species of moth

Conservula anodonta, the sharp angle shades, is a species of cutworm or dart moth in the family Noctuidae.

== Overview ==
It is found in North America, where it is found in the Great Lakes area, east to the atlantic from New Brunswick to New York, and west to Minnesota and Ontario.

The wingspan is around 30 mm. The wings are medium brown with a dark brown ring and spots. Adults are found in July.

The moth resides in mixed and coniferous forests. They are nocturnal and are attracted to light and bait.

The MONA or Hodges number for Conservula anodonta is 9548.
