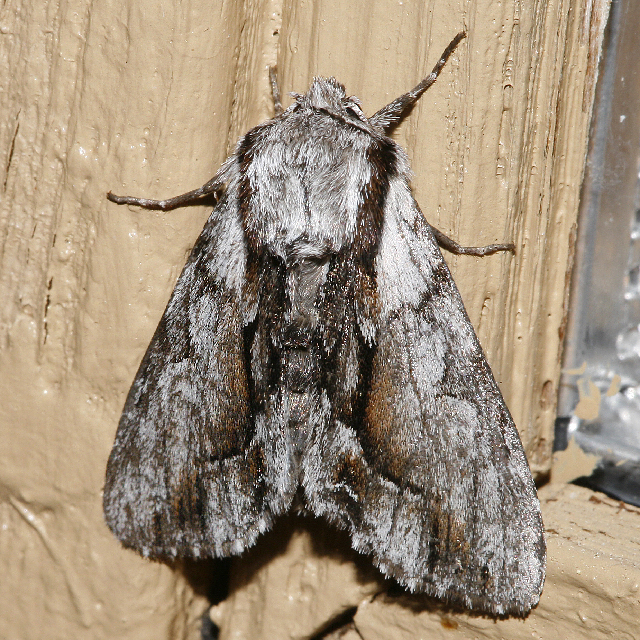

Scientific classification
- Domain: Eukaryota
- Kingdom: Animalia
- Phylum: Arthropoda
- Class: Insecta
- Order: Lepidoptera
- Superfamily: Noctuoidea
- Family: Noctuidae
- Tribe: Xylenini
- Subtribe: Xylenina
- Genus: Hyppa
- Species: H. indistincta

Binomial name
- Hyppa indistincta Smith, 1894

= Hyppa indistincta =

Species of moth

Hyppa indistincta is a species of cutworm or dart moth in the family Noctuidae. It is found in North America.

The MONA or Hodges number for Hyppa indistincta is 9581.
