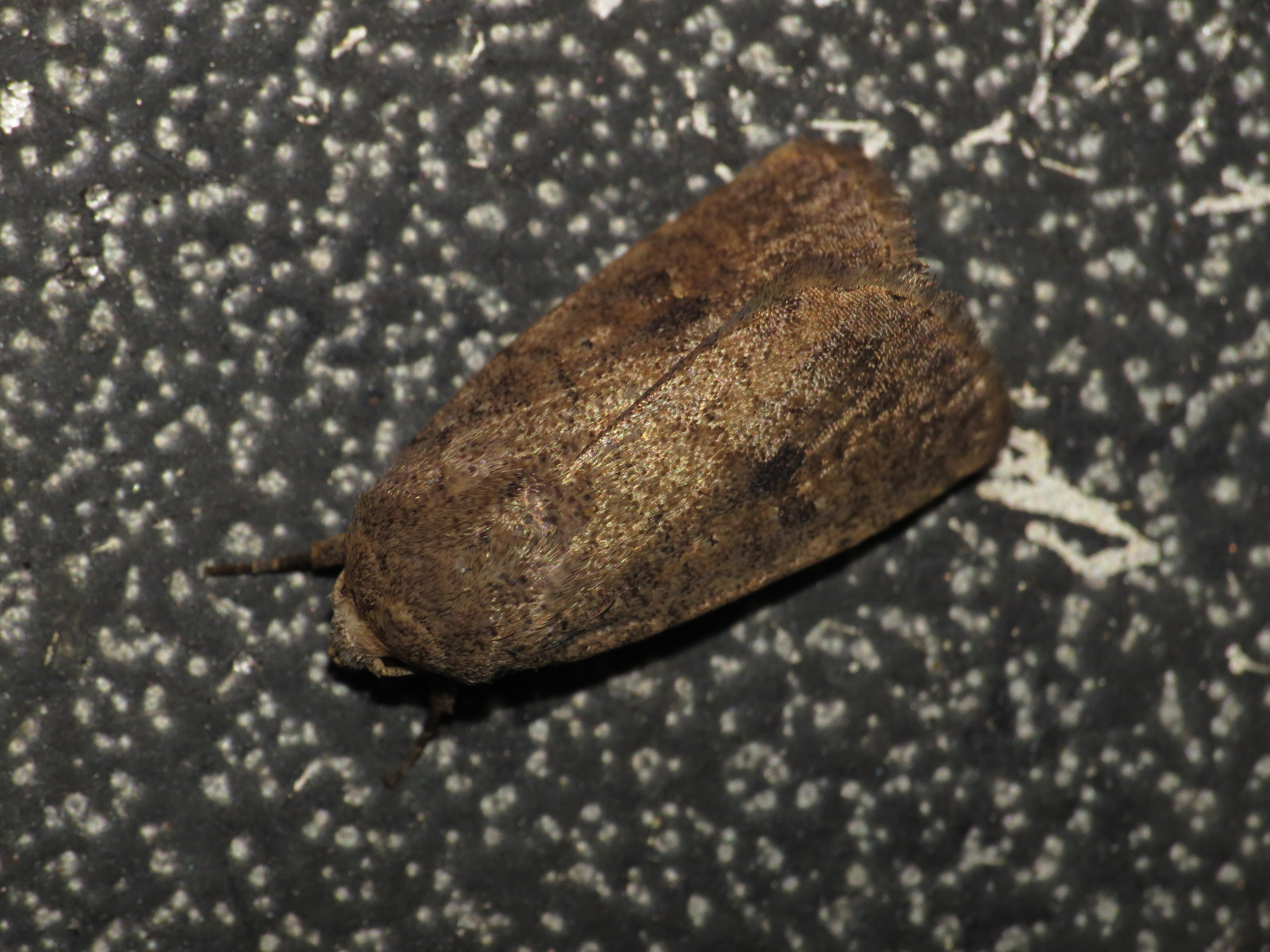
- Clump Point, Mission Beach, Queensland, Australia

Scientific classification
- Kingdom: Animalia
- Phylum: Arthropoda
- Class: Insecta
- Order: Lepidoptera
- Superfamily: Noctuoidea
- Family: Noctuidae
- Genus: Athetis
- Species: A. reclusa

Binomial name
- Athetis reclusa (Walker, 1862)

Synonyms
- Prodenia reclusa Walker, 1862; Caradrina insignifica Bethune-Baker, 1906; Elydna sparna Wileman & West, 1929

= Athetis reclusa =

Species of moth

Athetis reclusa is a moth of the family Noctuidae first described by Francis Walker in 1862. It is found from Sundaland to New Caledonia and Fiji. The habitat consists of open areas from sea level up to 1,200 meters.

== Description ==
The wingspan is about 25 mm. Male with a cleft corneous ridge clothed with scales on vertex of head. Abdomen clothed with woolly pile. It is a stoutly built moth. In male, collar and abdomen black. Second joint of palpi black. Forewings with the basal area clothed with ochreous hair. Hindwings with yellowish base. Some specimens have a black speck in cell of forewing and a series of specks on the postmedial line and margin. The female is pale chestnut brownish. Forewings with very faint traces of usual markings of male. There is a prominent ochreous postmedial line slightly curved from the costa to vein 2, which is non-waved. Hindwings are much paler.

== Ecology ==
The larvae feed on the leaves of Brassica species, as well as Arachis hypogaea.
