= Protoperigea anotha =

Scientific classification
- Kingdom: Animalia
- Phylum: Arthropoda
- Class: Insecta
- Order: Lepidoptera
- Superfamily: Noctuoidea
- Family: Noctuidae
- Genus: Protoperigea
- Species: P. anotha

Binomial name
- Protoperigea anotha (Dyar, 1904)

Species of moth

Protoperigea anotha, the kaslo rustic, is a species of cutworm or dart moth in the family Noctuidae. It is found in North America.

The MONA or Hodges number for Protoperigea anotha is 9642.
