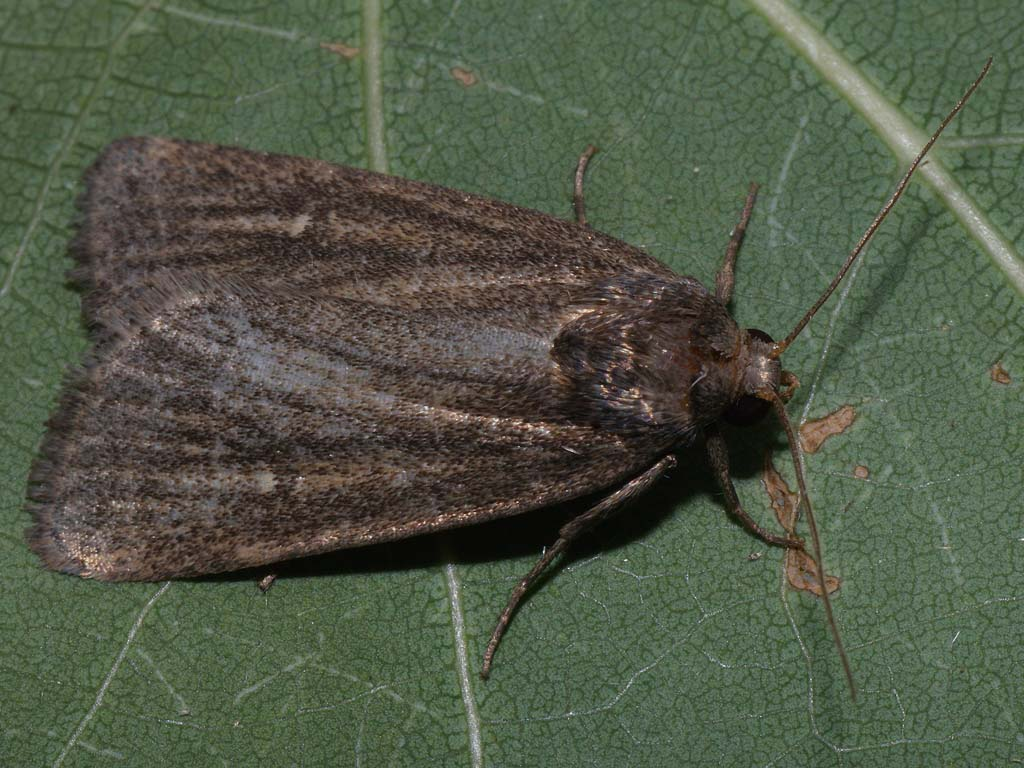

Scientific classification
- Domain: Eukaryota
- Kingdom: Animalia
- Phylum: Arthropoda
- Class: Insecta
- Order: Lepidoptera
- Superfamily: Noctuoidea
- Family: Noctuidae
- Genus: Athetis
- Species: A. lepigone

Binomial name
- Athetis lepigone (Möschler, 1860)

= Athetis lepigone =

Species of moth

Athetis lepigone is a species of moth, belonging to the genus Athetis.

It has cosmopolitan distribution.
