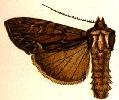

Scientific classification
- Kingdom: Animalia
- Phylum: Arthropoda
- Class: Insecta
- Order: Lepidoptera
- Superfamily: Noctuoidea
- Family: Noctuidae
- Genus: Hyppa
- Species: H. xylinoides

Binomial name
- Hyppa xylinoides (Guenée, 1852)

Synonyms
- Hyppa ancocisconensis Morrison, 1875

= Hyppa xylinoides =

Species of moth

Hyppa xylinoides, known generally as the common hyppa or cranberry cutworm, is a species of cutworm or dart moth in the family Noctuidae. It is found in North America.

The MONA or Hodges number for Hyppa xylinoides is 9578.
