= Conservula alambica =

Scientific classification
- Kingdom: Animalia
- Phylum: Arthropoda
- Class: Insecta
- Order: Lepidoptera
- Superfamily: Noctuoidea
- Family: Noctuidae
- Genus: Conservula
- Species: C. alambica

Binomial name
- Conservula alambica Gaede, 1915

Species of moth

Conservula alambica is a moth of the family Noctuidae. It is found in South Africa and in Cameroon.

This species has a wingspan of 28 millimetres (1.1 in).
