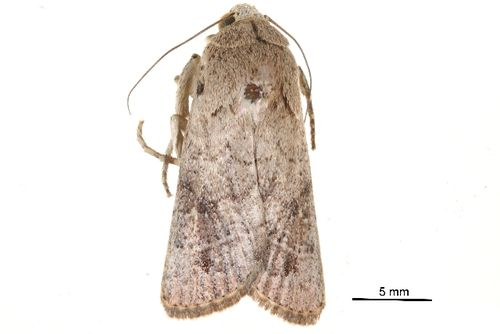

Scientific classification
- Kingdom: Animalia
- Phylum: Arthropoda
- Class: Insecta
- Order: Lepidoptera
- Superfamily: Noctuoidea
- Family: Noctuidae
- Genus: Athetis
- Species: A. nonagrica

Binomial name
- Athetis nonagrica (Walker, [1863])

Synonyms
- Elydna nonagrica (Walker, 1864); Curgia nonagrica Walker, 1864; Amphipyra agrotoides Snellen, 1880

= Athetis nonagrica =

Species of moth

Athetis nonagrica is a moth of the family Noctuidae. It is found in Borneo, Peninsular Malaysia, Sulawesi and New Guinea.

== Taxonomy ==
The name nonagrica has been applied consistently to specimens that are in fact the more widespread species Athetis thoracica.
