= Athetis striolata =

Scientific classification
- Domain: Eukaryota
- Kingdom: Animalia
- Phylum: Arthropoda
- Class: Insecta
- Order: Lepidoptera
- Superfamily: Noctuoidea
- Family: Noctuidae
- Genus: Athetis
- Species: A. striolata

Binomial name
- Athetis striolata (Butler, [1886])

Synonyms
- Caradrina striolata Butler, 1886; Caradrina acallis Turner, 1903; Rictonis acallis

Species of moth

Athetis striolata is a moth of the family Noctuidae. It was described by Arthur Gardiner Butler in 1886. It is found on Fiji and in Australia (the Northern Territory, Queensland and New South Wales).
