= Conservula malagasa =

Scientific classification
- Domain: Eukaryota
- Kingdom: Animalia
- Phylum: Arthropoda
- Class: Insecta
- Order: Lepidoptera
- Superfamily: Noctuoidea
- Family: Noctuidae
- Genus: Conservula
- Species: C. malagasa

Binomial name
- Conservula malagasa (Gaede, 1915)

Synonyms
- Conservula triangulata Kenrick, 1917

Species of moth

Conservula malagasa is a moth of the family Noctuidae. It is found in Madagascar and the Comoros.

Gaede described this species as close to Conservula sinensis with a wingspan of 27 mm.
