= Athetis renalis =

Scientific classification
- Domain: Eukaryota
- Kingdom: Animalia
- Phylum: Arthropoda
- Class: Insecta
- Order: Lepidoptera
- Superfamily: Noctuoidea
- Family: Noctuidae
- Genus: Athetis
- Species: A. renalis

Binomial name
- Athetis renalis (Moore, [1884])

Synonyms
- Radinacra renalis Moore, [1884]

Species of moth

Athetis renalis is a moth of the family Noctuidae first described by Frederic Moore in 1884. It is found in Sri Lanka.
