= Nedra stewarti =

Scientific classification
- Kingdom: Animalia
- Phylum: Arthropoda
- Class: Insecta
- Order: Lepidoptera
- Superfamily: Noctuoidea
- Family: Noctuidae
- Genus: Nedra
- Species: N. stewarti

Binomial name
- Nedra stewarti (Grote, 1875)

Synonyms
- Actinotia stewarti Grote, 1875; Delta steuarti Hampson, 1909

Species of moth

Nedra stewarti is a moth in the family Noctuidae. It is found in California and Oregon.
