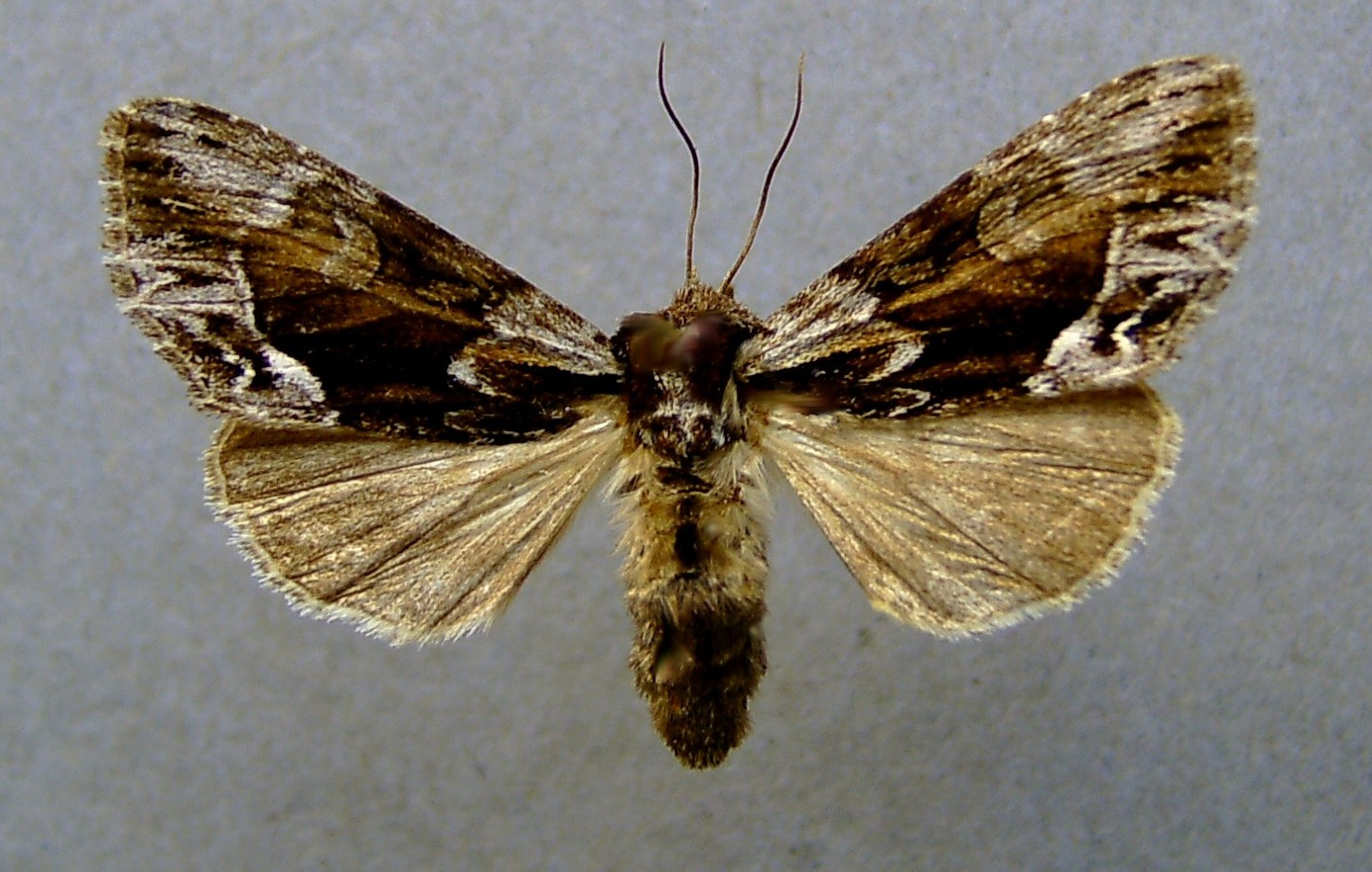

Scientific classification
- Domain: Eukaryota
- Kingdom: Animalia
- Phylum: Arthropoda
- Class: Insecta
- Order: Lepidoptera
- Superfamily: Noctuoidea
- Family: Noctuidae
- Genus: Hyppa
- Species: H. rectilinea

Binomial name
- Hyppa rectilinea (Esper, 1788)

Synonyms
- Phalaena (Noctua) rectilinea Esper, 1788; Meganephria albopicta Matsumura, 1925

= Hyppa rectilinea =

Species of moth

Hyppa rectilinea, the Saxon, is a moth of the family Noctuidae. It is found in Europe, but mostly in northern and central Europe. In the south, it is found in scattered populations, mainly in mountainous areas (northern Italy). To the east, its range stretches through the Palearctic and eastern Siberia, up to the Pacific Ocean and Japan.

== Technical description and variation ==
The wingspan is 33–41 mm. Forewing brown, the basal and terminal areas mixed with white towards costa; the median space darker and reddish below middle; a thick black streak from base below cell, below which the basal area is darker; inner and outer lines black conversely edged with white, the inner angled on submedian fold, the outer with a white patch before it on the same fold; a black bar between the two lines along it; upper stigmata large, mixed with white, and black-edged; the orbicular flattened; subterminal line whitish with black teeth below middle, above middle marked by black subterminal dashes between the veins; hindwing brownish, paler towards base.

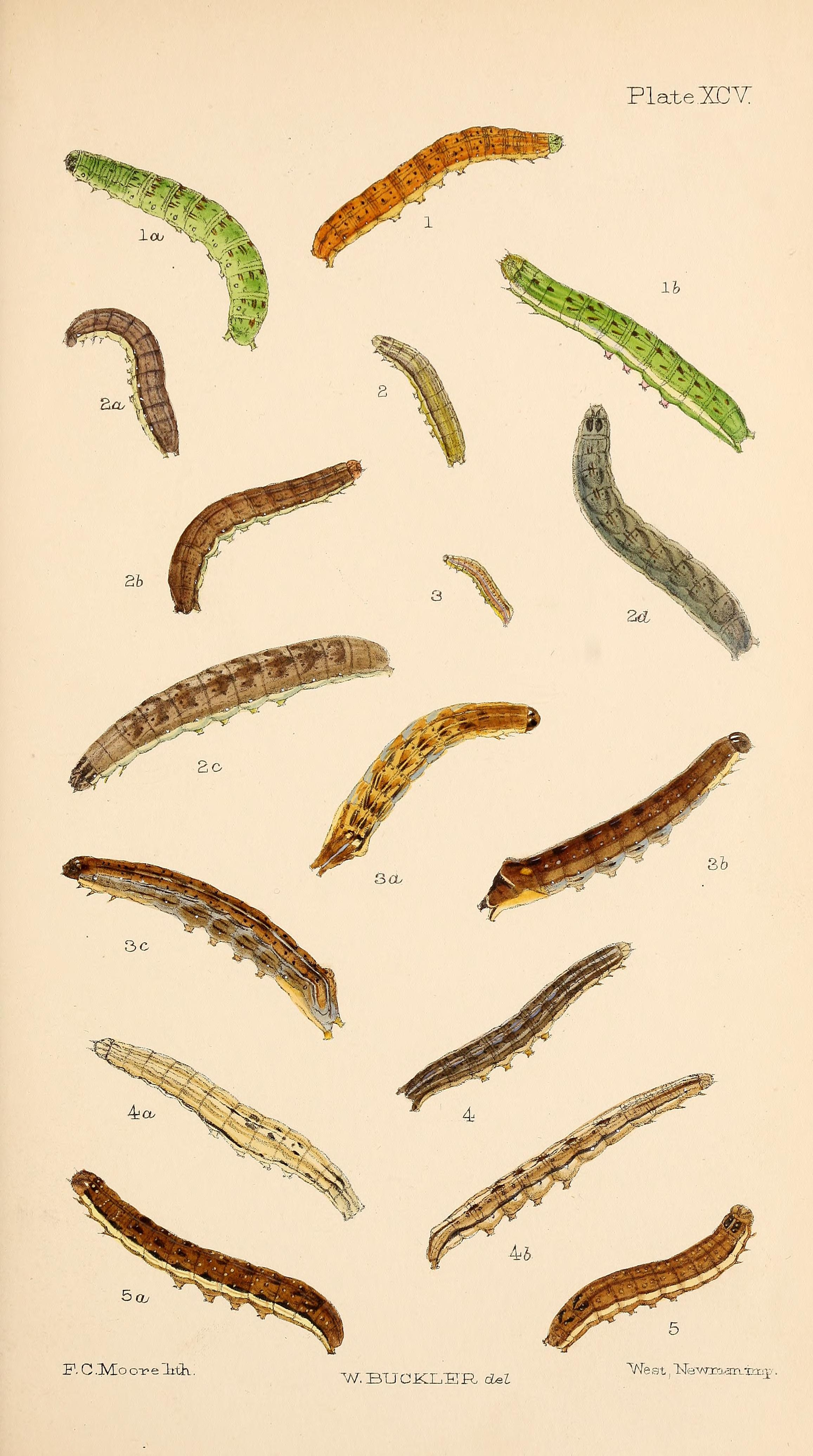
Figs .3, 3a, 3b, 3c larvae in various stages

== Biology ==
Adults are on wing from the end of May to the beginning of August in one generation.

Larva mottled pale and dark brown, tinged with purple along the sides; dorsal line pale, with dark edges, somewhat interrupted; subdorsal series of oblique pale stripes, dark-edged behind;spiracular line pale; segment 11 with two ochreous dots; head dark brown. The larvae feed on the leaves of various plants, including Vaccinium myrtillus and other Vaccinium species, as well as Salix and Rubus.
