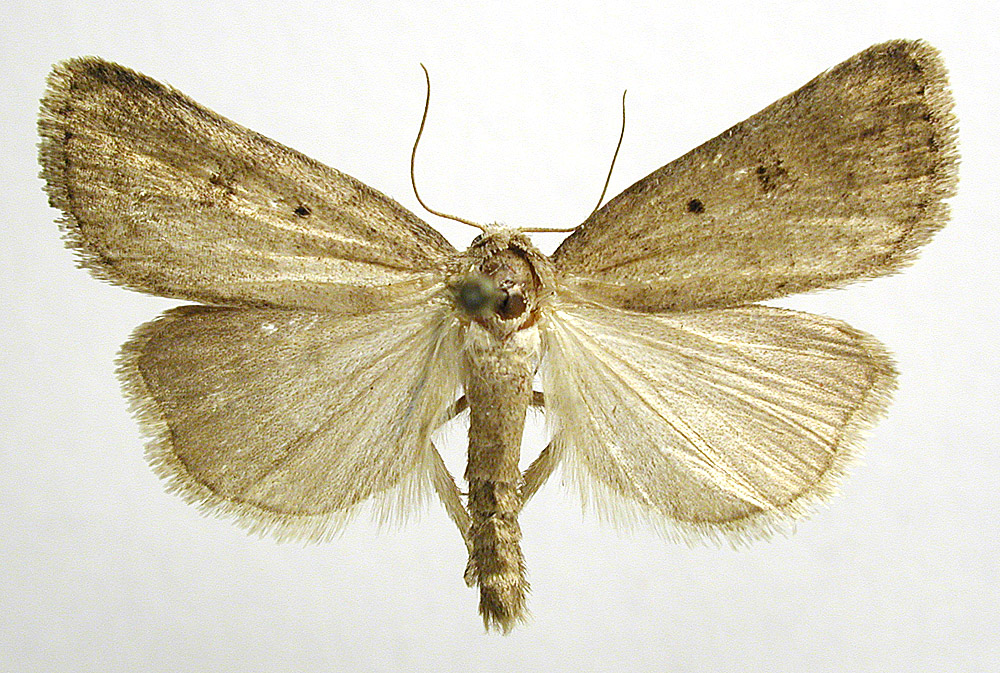

Scientific classification
- Domain: Eukaryota
- Kingdom: Animalia
- Phylum: Arthropoda
- Class: Insecta
- Order: Lepidoptera
- Superfamily: Noctuoidea
- Family: Noctuidae
- Genus: Athetis
- Species: A. gluteosa

Binomial name
- Athetis gluteosa (Treitschke, 1835)

Synonyms
- Caradrina gluteosa Treitschke, 1835; Hydrilla uliginosa Boisduval, 1840; Caradrina grisescens Poujade, 1887; Hydrilla kitti Rebel, 1913; Athetis lapidosa Berio, 1977

= Athetis gluteosa =

Species of moth

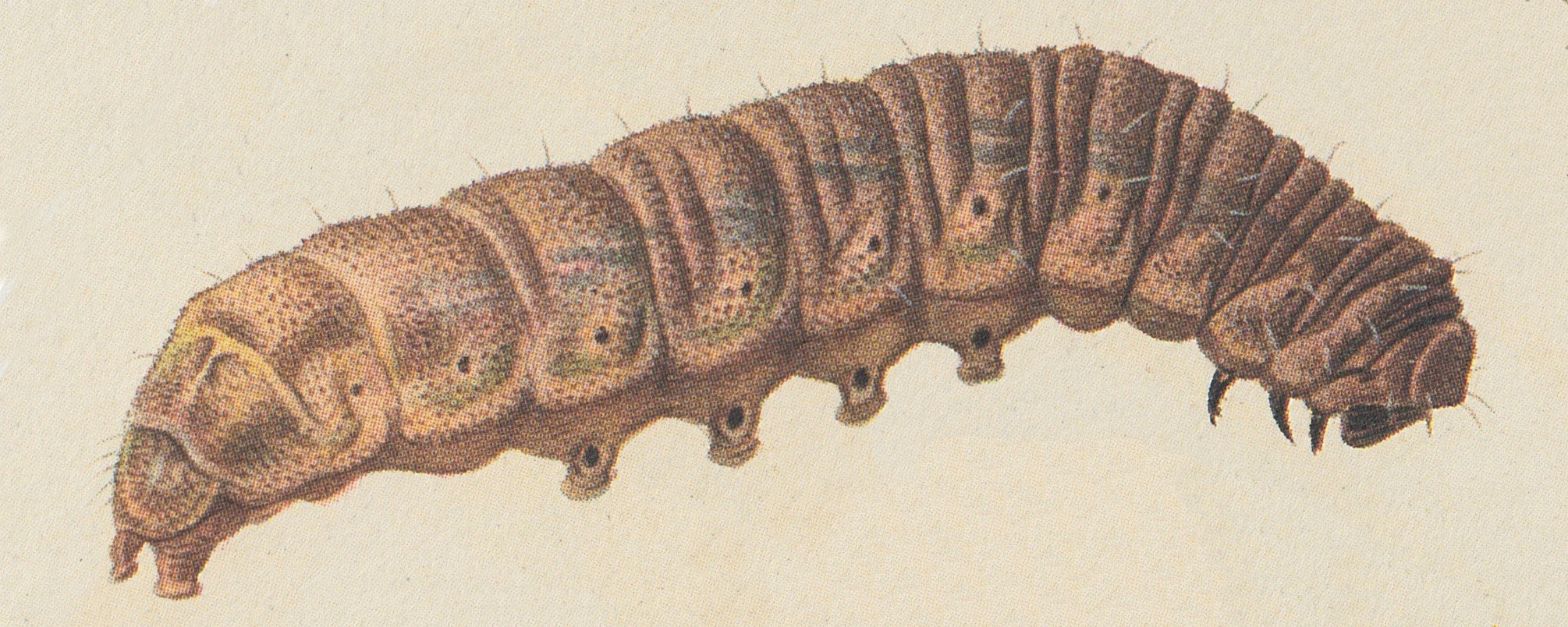
Caterpillar

Athetis gluteosa is a moth of the family Noctuidae. It is found from Norway, the Netherlands, Belgium and France, through central and southern Europe to northern Turkey, Transcaucasia, southern Russia, the southern parts of the Ural, southern Siberia, the Korean Peninsula and Japan.

The wingspan is 24–27 mm. Adults are on wing from the end of June to mid August in one generation.
