= Nedra albiclava =

Scientific classification
- Domain: Eukaryota
- Kingdom: Animalia
- Phylum: Arthropoda
- Class: Insecta
- Order: Lepidoptera
- Superfamily: Noctuoidea
- Family: Noctuidae
- Genus: Nedra
- Species: N. albiclava

Binomial name
- Nedra albiclava (Druce, 1908)

Synonyms
- Delta albiclava Druce, 1908

Species of moth

Nedra albiclava is a moth in the family Noctuidae. It is found in South America, including and possibly restricted to its type location Peru.
