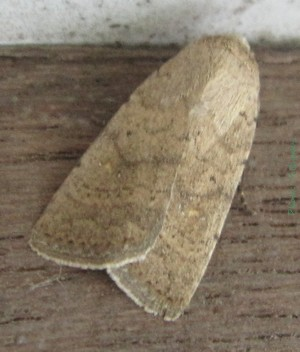
- Athetis ignava
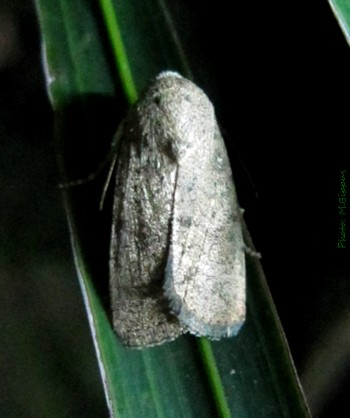

Scientific classification
- Kingdom: Animalia
- Phylum: Arthropoda
- Class: Insecta
- Order: Lepidoptera
- Superfamily: Noctuoidea
- Family: Noctuidae
- Genus: Athetis
- Species: A. ignava

Binomial name
- Athetis ignava (Guenée, 1852)

Synonyms
- Caradrina ignava Guenée, 1852; Caradrina expolita Butler, 1876; Caradrina pervicax Wallengren 1875; Athetis pervicax (Wallengren, 1875)

= Athetis ignava =

Species of moth

Athetis ignava is a moth of the family Noctuidae. It is found in Southern and Eastern Africa, including the islands of the Indian Ocean.

The wingspan is approx. 30–35 mm

Host plant: Acacia mearnsii De Wild. (Fabaceae)
