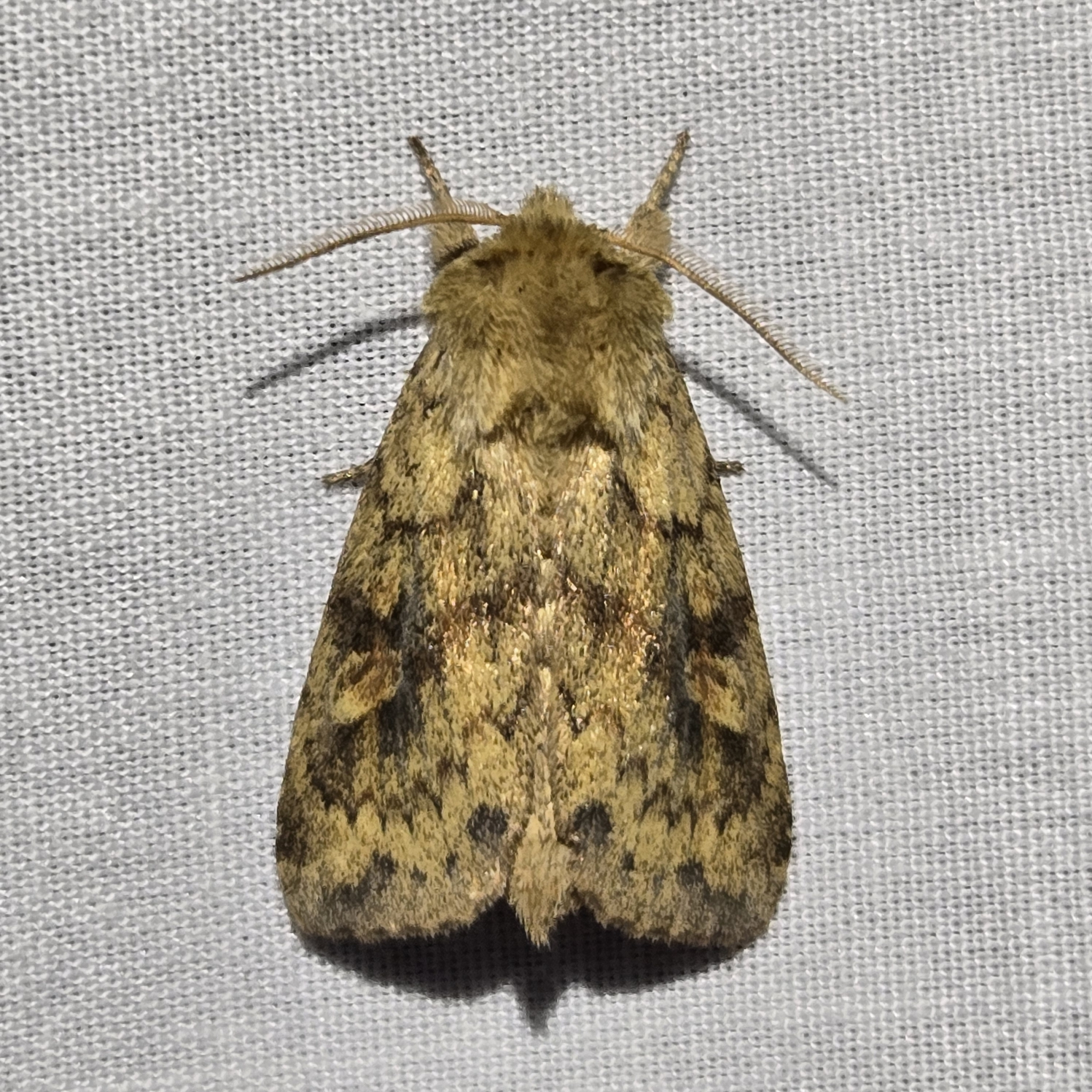

Scientific classification
- Kingdom: Animalia
- Phylum: Arthropoda
- Clade: Pancrustacea
- Class: Insecta
- Order: Lepidoptera
- Superfamily: Noctuoidea
- Family: Noctuidae
- Genus: Bellura
- Species: B. vulnifica

Binomial name
- Bellura vulnifica (Grote, 1873)

Synonyms
- Bellura diffusa (Grote, 1878); Bellura melanopyga (Grote, 1881)

= Bellura vulnifica =

Species of moth

Bellura vulnifica, the black-tailed diver, is a species of cutworm or dart moth in the family Noctuidae. It is found in North America.
