= Conservula v-brunneum =

Scientific classification
- Kingdom: Animalia
- Phylum: Arthropoda
- Class: Insecta
- Order: Lepidoptera
- Superfamily: Noctuoidea
- Family: Noctuidae
- Genus: Conservula
- Species: C. v-brunneum

Binomial name
- Conservula v-brunneum (Guenée, 1852)

Synonyms
- Charidea v-brunneum Guenée, 1852; Appana cingalesa Moore, [1887]

Species of moth

Conservula v-brunneum is a moth of the family Noctuidae that was first described by Achille Guenée in 1852. It is found in Sri Lanka and India.

Its larval host plant is Pteridium aquilinum.
