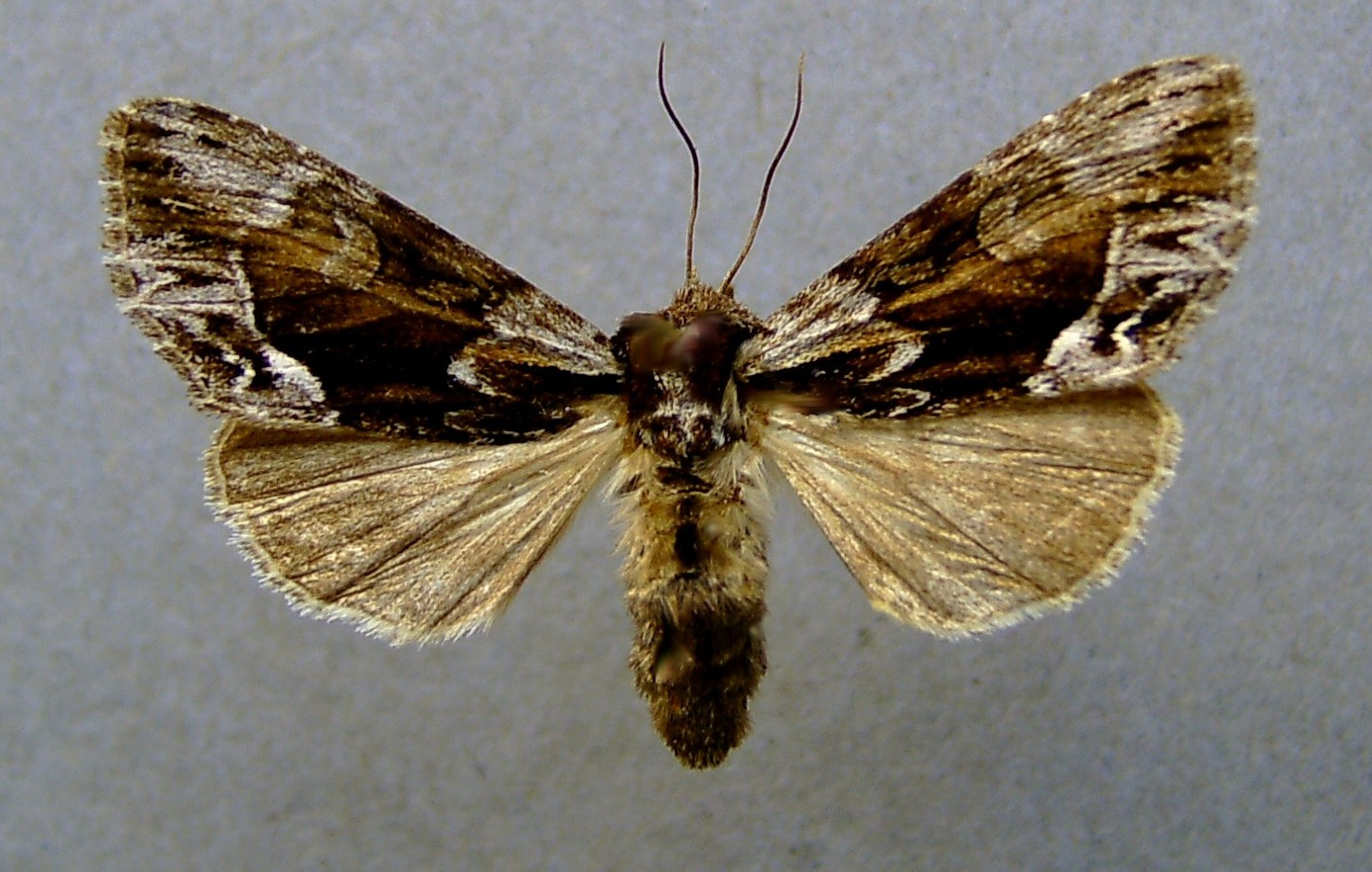
- Hyppa rectilinea

Scientific classification
- Domain: Eukaryota
- Kingdom: Animalia
- Phylum: Arthropoda
- Class: Insecta
- Order: Lepidoptera
- Superfamily: Noctuoidea
- Family: Noctuidae
- Subtribe: Xylenina
- Genus: Hyppa; Duponchel, [1845]

= Hyppa =

Genus of moths

Hyppa is a genus of moths in the family Noctuidae.

== Species ==
- Hyppa brunneicrista Smith, 1902
- Hyppa contrasta McDunnough, 1946
- Hyppa indistincta Smith, 1894
- Hyppa potamus J.T. Troubridge & Lafontaine, 2004
- Hyppa rectilinea Esper, 1788
- Hyppa xylinoides Guenée in Boisduval & Guenée, 1852 (syn: Hyppa ancocisconensis Morrison, 1875)
