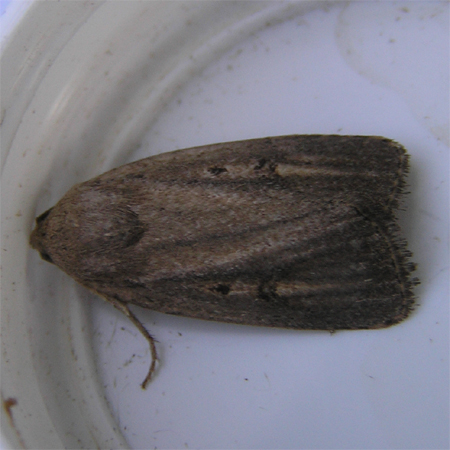

Scientific classification
- Kingdom: Animalia
- Phylum: Arthropoda
- Clade: Pancrustacea
- Class: Insecta
- Order: Lepidoptera
- Superfamily: Noctuoidea
- Family: Noctuidae
- Genus: Athetis
- Species: A. hospes

Binomial name
- Athetis hospes (Freyer, 1831)

Synonyms
- Caradrina hospes Freyer, 1831; Proxenus hospes

= Athetis hospes =

Porter's rustic

Species of moth

Athetis hospes or Proxenus hospes, also known as Porter's rustic, is a moth of the family Noctuidae which was described by Christian Friedrich Freyer in 1835. It is found in Spain, southern France, Italy, on the Balkan Peninsula, Crete, Turkey and northern Iran. The species seems to be expanding its range in north-western Europe with records from Great Britain and the Netherlands.

== Technical description and variation ==
P. hospes Frr. (= uliginosa H.-Sch. nec Bsd., lepigone Roesel nec Moeschl.). Forewing glossy ochreous washed with rufous, the veins grey dotted with dark; lines obscure; the inner waved, toothed with black points inwards on the veins; outer line dentate lunulate with black and grey points on the veins; orbicular a blackish point; reniform a small dark lunule, from which an ochreous streak runs to termen above vein 5; terminal spots black; hindwing whitish with the apical area brownish; the tufts of hair on tibiae and abdomen yellow. Larva greyish yellow, whitish beneath; dorsal line whitish; subdorsal and spiracular lines redbrown;spiracles yellow ringed with black; head brown. The wingspan is 26–30 mm.

== Biology ==
Adults are on wing from May to June and again from August to September.

The larvae feed on various low-growing plants, including tobacco. The species overwinters as full-grown larvae in the soil. They are gregarious in the first instar.
