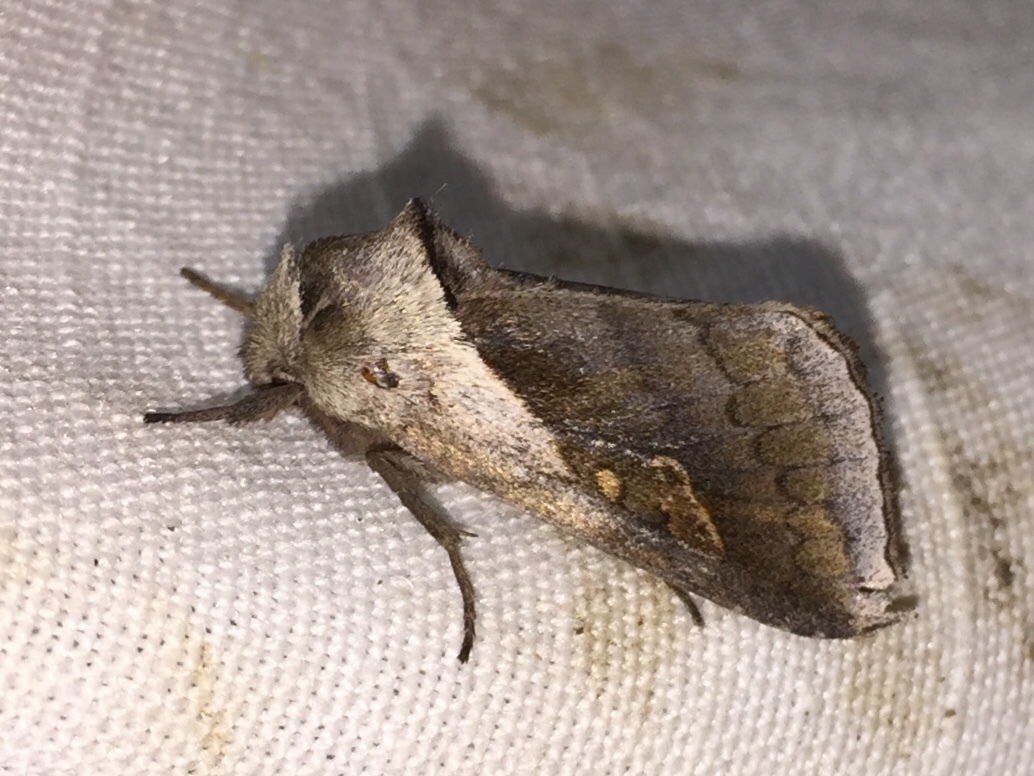
- Bellura brehmei

Scientific classification
- Kingdom: Animalia
- Phylum: Arthropoda
- Clade: Pancrustacea
- Class: Insecta
- Order: Lepidoptera
- Superfamily: Noctuoidea
- Family: Noctuidae
- Tribe: Arzamini
- Genus: Bellura; Walker, 1865

= Bellura =

Genus of moths

Bellura is a genus of moths in the family Noctuidae.

== Species ==
- Bellura anoa (Dyar, 1913)
- Bellura brehmei (Barnes & McDunnough, 1916)
- Bellura densa (Walker, 1865)
- Bellura gortynoides Walker, 1865
- Bellura matanzasensis (Dyar, 1922)
- Bellura obliqua (Walker, 1865)
- Bellura pleostigma (Dyar, 1913)
- Bellura vulnifica (Grote, 1873) (syn: Arzama diffusa Grote, 1878, Arzama melanopyga Grote, 1881)
