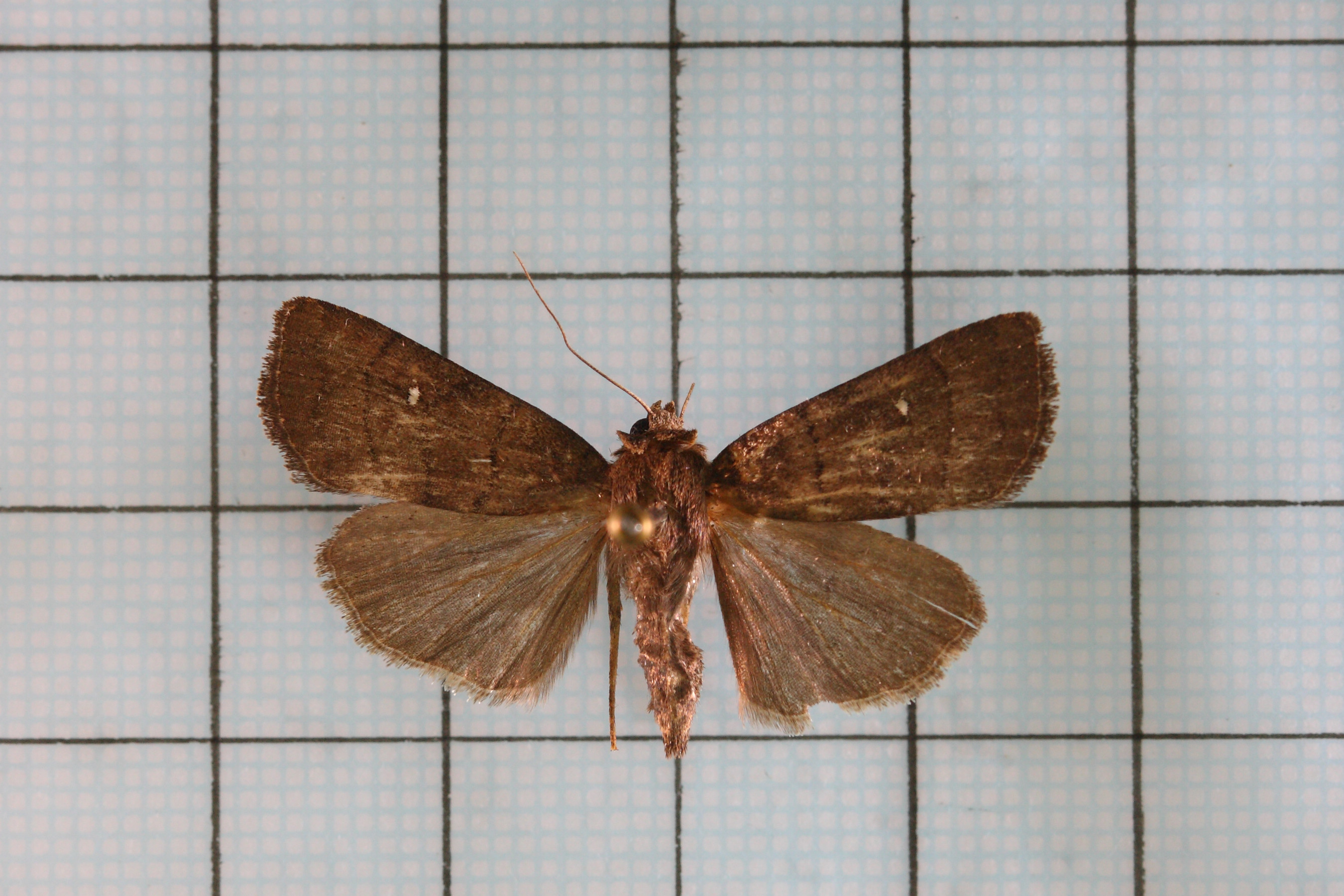

Scientific classification
- Domain: Eukaryota
- Kingdom: Animalia
- Phylum: Arthropoda
- Class: Insecta
- Order: Lepidoptera
- Superfamily: Noctuoidea
- Family: Noctuidae
- Genus: Athetis
- Species: A. lineosa

Binomial name
- Athetis lineosa (Moore, 1881)

Synonyms
- Dadica lineosa Moore, 1881; Dadica differenciata Bryk, 1949

= Athetis lineosa =

Species of moth

Athetis lineosa is a moth of the family Noctuidae. It is found in Asia, including Taiwan, Japan and India.

The wingspan is 31–37 mm.
