= Nedra =

- Nedra

Scientific classification
- Domain: Eukaryota
- Kingdom: Animalia
- Phylum: Arthropoda
- Class: Insecta
- Order: Lepidoptera
- Superfamily: Noctuoidea
- Family: Noctuidae
- Subfamily: Noctuinae
- Tribe: Actinotiini
- Genus: Nedra; Clarke, 1940

Genus of moths

Nedra is a genus of moths of the family Noctuidae.

== Species ==
- Nedra albiclava (Druce, 1908)
- Nedra dora Clarke, 1940
- Nedra goniosema (Hampson, 1909)
- Nedra hoeffleri Clarke, 1940
- Nedra peruviana (Hampson, 1914)
- Nedra ramosula (Guenée, 1851)
- Nedra stewarti (Grote, 1875)
- Nedra tropicalis (Schaus, 1911)
