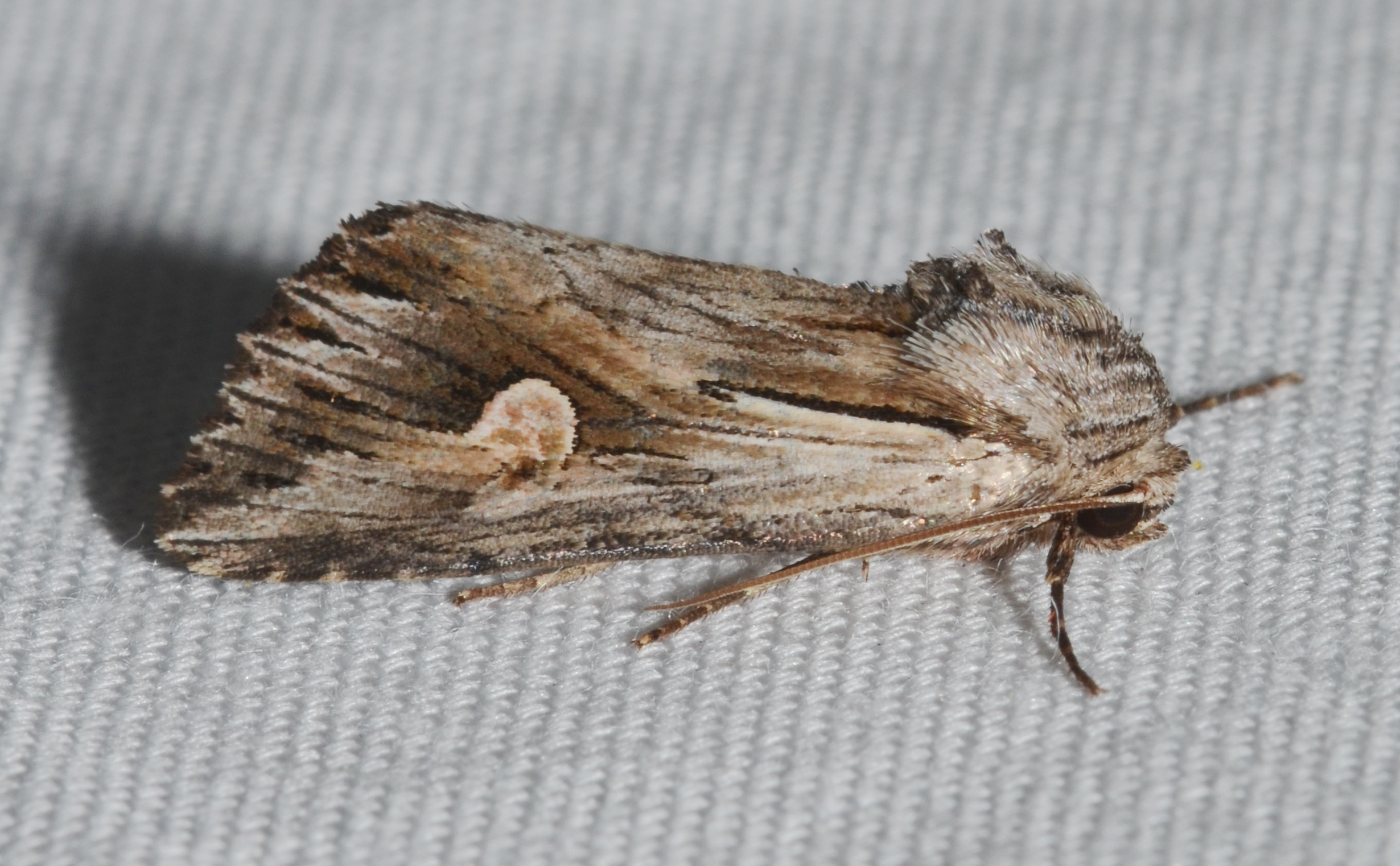

Scientific classification
- Kingdom: Animalia
- Phylum: Arthropoda
- Clade: Pancrustacea
- Class: Insecta
- Order: Lepidoptera
- Superfamily: Noctuoidea
- Family: Noctuidae
- Genus: Nedra
- Species: N. ramosula

Binomial name
- Nedra ramosula (Guenée, 1851)

Synonyms
- Cloantha ramosula Guenée, 1851

= Nedra ramosula =

Gray half-spot

Species of moth

Nedra ramosula, known as the gray half-spot, is a moth in the family Noctuidae. It is found from Manitoba to Newfoundland, south to Florida, west to Texas.

The wingspan is 28–48 mm. Adults are on wing from May to September in Ontario and from April to October in Ohio.

The larvae feed on Hypericum species.
