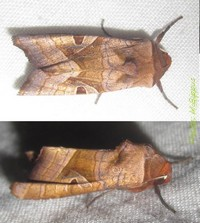
- Conservula cinisigna

Scientific classification
- Domain: Eukaryota
- Kingdom: Animalia
- Phylum: Arthropoda
- Class: Insecta
- Order: Lepidoptera
- Superfamily: Noctuoidea
- Family: Noctuidae
- Tribe: Phlogophorini
- Genus: Conservula; Grote, 1874

= Conservula =

Genus of moths

Conservula is a genus of moths in the family Noctuidae that was first erected by Augustus Radcliffe Grote in 1874.

== Description ==
Its eyes are naked and without lashes. The proboscis is fully developed. Palpi upturned and reaching vertex of head, thickly scaled where the third joint minute. Antennae simple in both sexes. Metathorax with tufts which are well developed in the American species, slight in other regions. Abdomen without tufts. Tibia spineless. Forewings with non-crenulate cilia.

== Species ==
- Conservula alambica Gaede, 1915
- Conservula ancillottoi (Berio, 1978)
- Conservula anodonta (Guenée, 1852)
- Conservula anthophyes (D. S. Fletcher, 1963)
- Conservula cinisigna de Joannis, 1906
- Conservula clarki Janse, 1937
- Conservula comoriensis (Viette, 1979)
- Conservula furca (D. S. Fletcher, 1961)
- Conservula indica (Moore, 1867)
- Conservula malagasa Gaede, 1915
- Conservula minor Holland, 1896
- Conservula rosacea (Saalmüller, 1891)
- Conservula scriptura (Rougeot & Laporte, 1983)
- Conservula simillima Berio, 1966
- Conservula sinensis Hampson, 1908
- Conservula subrosacea (Viette, 1958)
- Conservula v-brunneum (Guenée, 1852)
