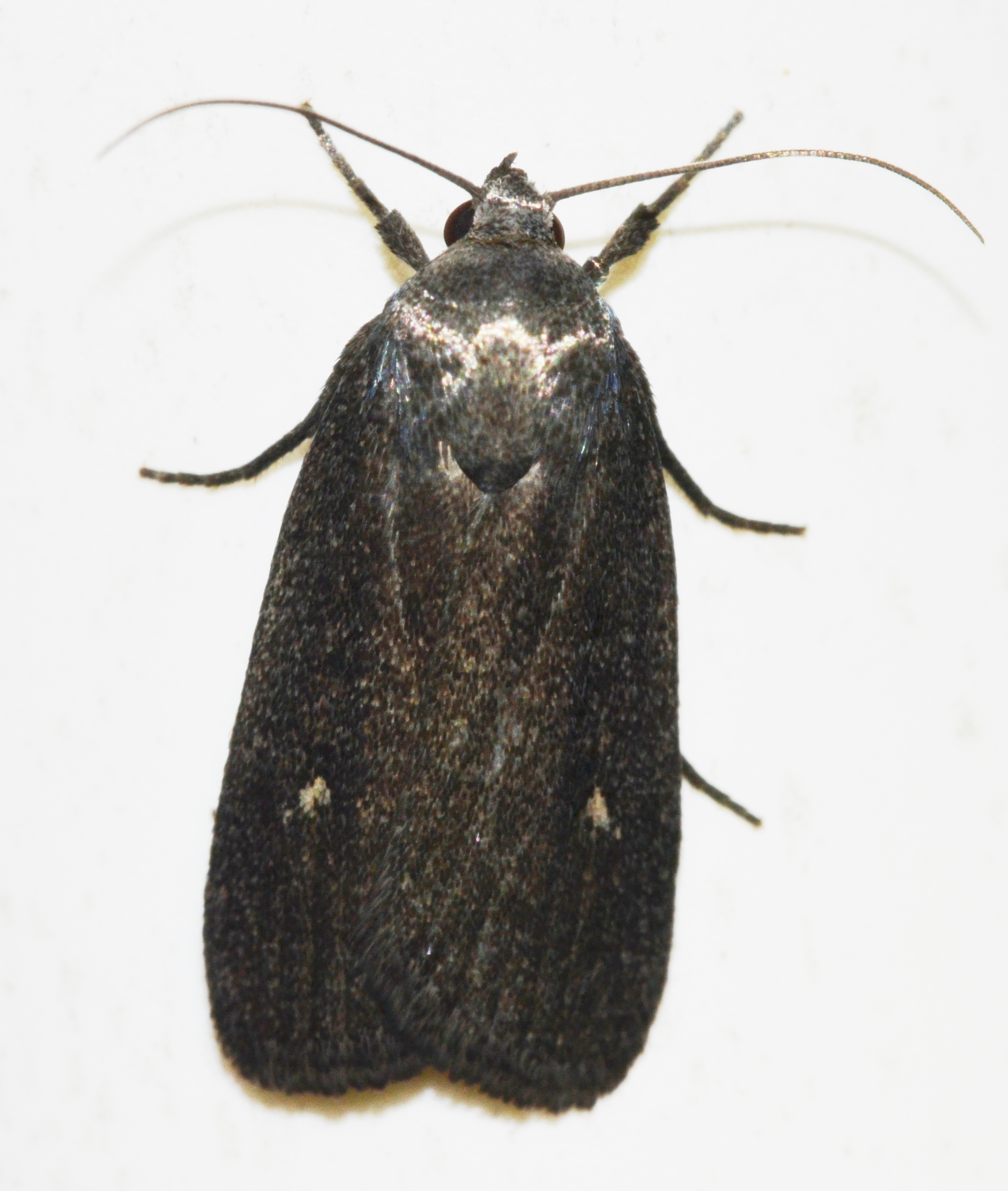

Scientific classification
- Domain: Eukaryota
- Kingdom: Animalia
- Phylum: Arthropoda
- Class: Insecta
- Order: Lepidoptera
- Superfamily: Noctuoidea
- Family: Noctuidae
- Genus: Proxenus
- Species: P. miranda

Binomial name
- Proxenus miranda (Grote, 1873)

Synonyms
- Caradrina miranda Grote, 1873; Athetis miranda; Caradrina nitens Dyar, 1904

= Proxenus miranda =

Species of moth

Proxenus miranda, the miranda moth or glistening rustic, is a moth of the family Noctuidae. It is found in most of North America, where it has been recorded south through California to Arizona and in the Rocky Mountains to Colorado in the west. In the east it is found from southern Canada to South Carolina, Tennessee and Texas. The habitat consists of moist, open forests and grasslands.

The wingspan is about 23–27 mm. Adults are on wing from May to October in two generations per year.

The larvae feed on various herbaceous plants, including Taraxacum, Fragaria and Medicago species.
