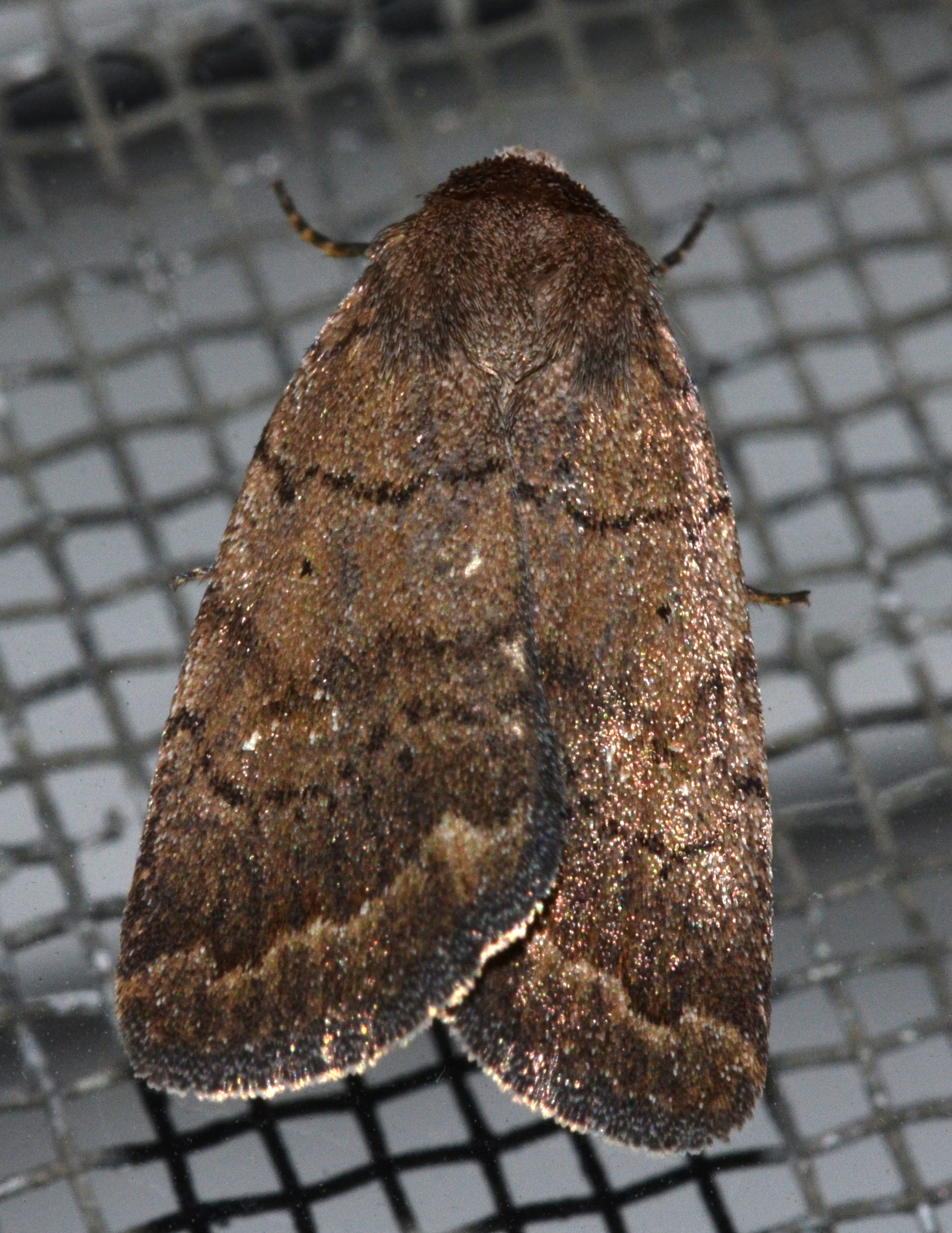

Scientific classification
- Kingdom: Animalia
- Phylum: Arthropoda
- Class: Insecta
- Order: Lepidoptera
- Superfamily: Noctuoidea
- Family: Noctuidae
- Genus: Athetis
- Species: A. tarda

Binomial name
- Athetis tarda (Guenée, 1852)

Synonyms
- Caradrina tarda Guenée, 1852; Anothordes tarda; Anorthodes prima Smith, 1891

= Athetis tarda =

Slowpoke moth

Species of moth

Athetis tarda, the slowpoke moth, is a moth of the family Noctuidae. It is found in North America, where it has been recorded from New Hampshire to Florida and from Missouri to Texas. The habitat consists of oak woodlands.

The wingspan is 23–35 mm. Adults are on wing from late March to May and again from late August to September.

The larvae feed on dead Quercus leaves.
