= Proxenus mindara =

Scientific classification
- Kingdom: Animalia
- Phylum: Arthropoda
- Clade: Pancrustacea
- Class: Insecta
- Order: Lepidoptera
- Superfamily: Noctuoidea
- Family: Noctuidae
- Genus: Proxenus
- Species: P. mindara

Binomial name
- Proxenus mindara Barnes & McDunnough, 1913

Species of moth

Proxenus mindara, the rough-skinned cutworm moth, is a species of cutworm or dart moth in the family Noctuidae. It was first described by William Barnes and James Halliday McDunnough in 1913 and it is found in North America.

The MONA or Hodges number for Proxenus mindara is 9648.
