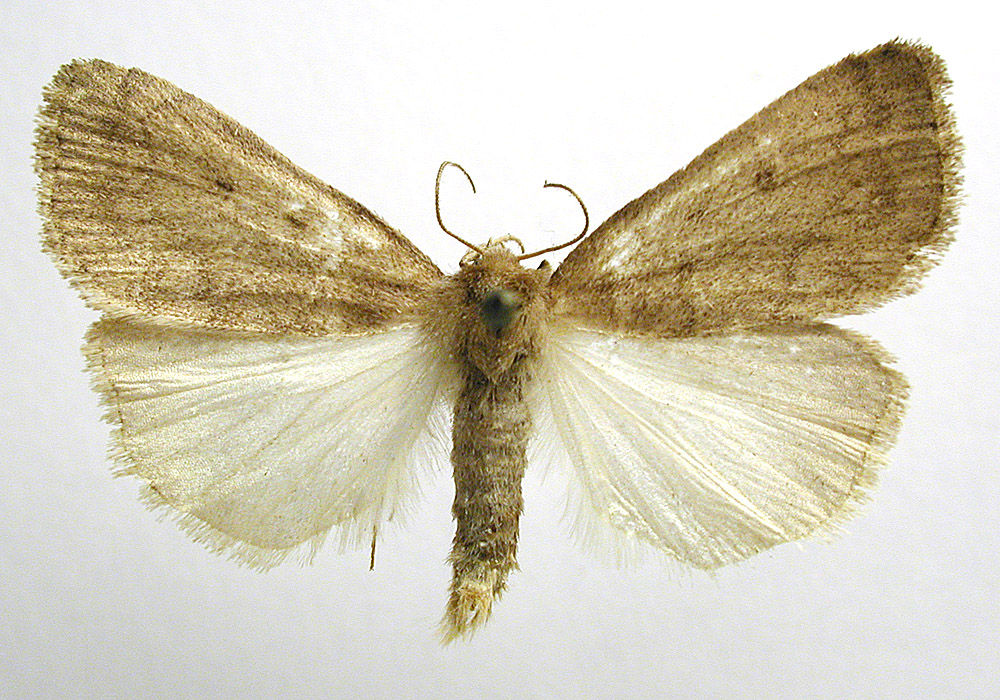

Scientific classification
- Domain: Eukaryota
- Kingdom: Animalia
- Phylum: Arthropoda
- Class: Insecta
- Order: Lepidoptera
- Superfamily: Noctuoidea
- Family: Noctuidae
- Genus: Athetis
- Species: A. pallustris

Binomial name
- Athetis pallustris (Hübner, [1808])

Synonyms
- Noctua pallustris Hübner, [1808]; Caradrina exilis Eversmann, 1842; Caradrina lutea Freyer, 1845; Hydrilla aboleta Guenée, 1852; Caradrina pallustris var. melanochroa Staudinger, 1892; Athetis sajana Hampson, 1909; Hydrilla palustris var. raebeli Dannehl, 1925; Cerastis transfuga Zetterstedt, [1839]

= Athetis pallustris =

Marsh moth

Species of moth

Athetis pallustris, the marsh moth, is a moth of the family Noctuidae. It is found in most of Europe, the southern Urals, southern Russia, Ukraine, eastern Turkey, Siberia, the Amur region, the Russian Far East, Mongolia and northern China.

== Technical description and variation ==
P. palustris Hbn. (= lutea Frr., luteola Frr., exilis Ev.) Male forewing dull grey brown, somewhat sparsely scaled; inner and outer lines slightly darker, indistinct; orbicular stigma an elongate dark point; reniform a narrow dark lunule; submarginal line faint, preceded by a dark shade, stronger at costa; hindwing paler fuscous; the smaller female has the wings much darker, brownish fuscous, — the form aboleta Guen., from Norway and Lapland, is decidedly paler, the forewing more ochreous with less distinct markings; the hindwing whiter: — melanochroa Stgr. from Amurland is much darker fuscous in both sexes: — sajana Hmps. is a greyer form. Larva brownish; dorsal line whitish; head black. The wingspan is 18–34mm.

== Biology ==
Adults are on wing from May to June.

The larvae feed on various low-growing plants such as Plantago species (including Plantago major).
