= Thivolleo rubritactalis =

Scientific classification
- Kingdom: Animalia
- Phylum: Arthropoda
- Class: Insecta
- Order: Lepidoptera
- Family: Crambidae
- Genus: Thivolleo
- Species: T. rubritactalis

Binomial name
- Thivolleo rubritactalis (Hampson, 1918)

Synonyms
- Hapalia rubritactalis Hampson, 1918

Species of moth

Thivolleo rubritactalis is a moth in the family Crambidae. It was described by George Hampson in 1918, under the name "Hapalia Rubritactalis". It is found in Tanzania.
