= Thivolleo xanthographa =

Scientific classification
- Kingdom: Animalia
- Phylum: Arthropoda
- Class: Insecta
- Order: Lepidoptera
- Family: Crambidae
- Genus: Thivolleo
- Species: T. xanthographa

Binomial name
- Thivolleo xanthographa (Hampson, 1913)

Synonyms
- Pionea xanthographa Hampson, 1913

Species of moth

Thivolleo xanthographa is a moth in the family Crambidae. It was described by George Hampson in 1913. It is found in Nigeria and the Democratic Republic of the Congo.
