= Thivolleo albicervix =

Scientific classification
- Domain: Eukaryota
- Kingdom: Animalia
- Phylum: Arthropoda
- Class: Insecta
- Order: Lepidoptera
- Family: Crambidae
- Genus: Thivolleo
- Species: T. albicervix

Binomial name
- Thivolleo albicervix Maes, 2006

Species of moth

Thivolleo albicervix is a moth in the family Crambidae. It was described by Koen V. N. Maes in 2006. It is found in Cameroon, the Central African Republic, the Democratic Republic of the Congo, Kenya, Tanzania and Uganda.
