= Thivolleo meruensis =

Scientific classification
- Kingdom: Animalia
- Phylum: Arthropoda
- Class: Insecta
- Order: Lepidoptera
- Family: Crambidae
- Genus: Thivolleo
- Species: T. meruensis

Binomial name
- Thivolleo meruensis Maes, 2006

Species of moth

Thivolleo meruensis is a moth in the family Crambidae. It was described by Koen V. N. Maes in 2006. It is found in Kenya.
