= Thivolleo =

Scientific classification
- Domain: Eukaryota
- Kingdom: Animalia
- Phylum: Arthropoda
- Class: Insecta
- Order: Lepidoptera
- Family: Crambidae
- Subfamily: Pyraustinae
- Genus: Thivolleo; Maes, 2006

Type species
- Thivolleo albicervix Maes, 2006

Genus of moths

Thivolleo is a genus of moths of the family Crambidae.

== Species ==
- Thivolleo albicervix Maes, 2006
- Thivolleo meruensis Maes, 2006
- Thivolleo rubritactalis (Hampson, 1918)
- Thivolleo xanthographa (Hampson, 1913)
