= List of noctuid genera: P =

The huge moth family Noctuidae contains the following genera:

A B C D E F G H I J K L M N O P Q R S T U V W X Y Z

- Pabulatrix
- Pachetra
- Pachnobia
- Pachyagrotis
- Pachycoa
- Pachygnathesis
- Pachyplastis
- Pachypolia
- Pachythrix
- Pacidara
- Paectes
- Paetica
- Pagyra
- Paida
- Pais
- Palada
- Palaeagrotis
- Palaeamathes
- Palaechthona
- Palaeocoleus
- Palaeographa
- Palaeoplusia
- Palaeosafia
- Palindia
- Palindiona
- Palkermes
- Pallachira
- Palpangula
- Palpidia
- Palpirectia
- Palponima
- Palthis
- Palthisomis
- Palura
- Palyna
- Pamirorea
- Pamparama
- Panarenia
- Panchrysia
- Pancra
- Pandesma
- Panemeria
- Pangrapta
- Pangraptella
- Pangraptica
- Panilla
- Panoblemma
- Panolis
- Panopoda
- Pansemna
- Pantura
- Pantydia
- Panula
- Paonidia
- Papaipema
- Papestra
- Papuacola
- Parabagrotis
- Parabarrovia
- Parabole
- Parabrachionycha
- Parabrachylomia
- Parabryophila
- Paracaroides
- Paracarsia
- Paraceliptera
- Paracentropus
- Parachabora
- Parachaea
- Parachalciope
- Paracodia
- Paracoeria
- Paracolax
- Paracretonia
- Paracroma
- Paracroria
- Paracullia
- Paradiarsia
- Paradiopa
- Paradrina
- Paraegle
- Paraegocera
- Parafodina
- Paragabara
- Paragarista
- Paragona
- Paragonitis
- Paragria
- Paragrotis
- Parahypenodes
- Paralectra
- Paralephana
- Parallelia
- Parallelura
- Paralopha
- Paralophata
- Paramathes
- Paramiana
- Paramimetica
- Paramocis
- Paranagia
- Paranataelia
- Parangitia
- Paranicla
- Paranoctua
- Paranoratha
- Paranyctycia
- Parapadna
- Parapamea
- Paraperplexia
- Parargidia
- Pararothia
- Parasada
- Parascotia
- Parasimyra
- Parasiopsis
- Parasoloe
- Parastenopterygia
- Parastichtis
- Parathermes
- Paratolna
- Paratrachea
- Paratuerta
- Paraviminia
- Paraxestia
- Parca
- Parelectra
- Parelia
- Parerastria
- Pareuchalcia
- Pareuplexia
- Pareuxoa
- Pareuxoina
- Parexarnis
- Parhypena
- Pariambia
- Parilyrgis
- Paroligia
- Parolulis
- Paromphale
- Parora
- Parorena
- Paroruza
- Parosmia
- Parothria
- Parsyngrapha
- Parvablemma
- Parvapenna
- Paryrias
- Pasipeda
- Pastona
- Pataeta
- Paucgraphia
- Paurophylla
- Paurosceles
- Paventia
- Pechipogo
- Pectinidia
- Pectinifera
- Pediarcha
- Pelamia
- Pelecia
- Peliala
- Pelodesis
- Pelodia
- Peltothis
- Pemphigostola
- Penicillaria
- Penisa
- Pennalticola
- Penza
- Peosina
- Peperina
- Peperita
- Peraniana
- Peranomogyna
- Peranua
- Perasia
- Perata
- Percalpe
- Perciana
- Periambia
- Periconta
- Pericyma
- Peridroma
- Peridrome
- Perigea
- Perigeodes
- Perigonica
- Perigrapha
- Perinaenia
- Periopta
- Periphanes
- Periphrage
- Peripyra
- Periscepta
- Perissandria
- Perloplusia
- Peropalpus
- Perophiusa
- Perplexhadena
- Persectania
- Persidia
- Perta
- Perynea
- Pessida
- Petalumaria
- Peteroma
- Petilampa
- Petrowskya
- Peucephila
- Phachthia
- Phaegorista
- Phaenagrotis
- Phaeoblemma
- Phaeocyma
- Phaeomorpha
- Phaeopyra
- Phaeoscia
- Phaeozona
- Phagytra
- Phaioecia
- Phalaenoides
- Phalaenophana
- Phalaenostola
- Phalerodes
- Phalga
- Phanaspa
- Pharga
- Phasidia
- Pherechoa
- Phialta
- Phibromia
- Phidrimana
- Philareta
- Philecia
- Philippodamias
- Philochrysia
- Philogethes
- Philomma
- Philona
- Philorgyia
- Phimodium
- Phleboeis
- Phlegetonia
- Phlogochroa
- Phlogophora
- Phlyctaina
- Phoberia
- Phobolosia
- Phoebophilus
- Phoenicophanta
- Phoperigea
- Phorica
- Phornacisa
- Phosphila
- Photedes
- Phragmatiphila
- Phrictia
- Phrodita
- Phumana
- Phuphena
- Phurys
- Phycidimorpha
- Phycoma
- Phycopterus
- Phylapora
- Phyllodes
- Phyllophila
- Phyprosopus
- Physetica
- Physula
- Physulodes
- Phytometra
- Piada
- Piala
- Piana
- Pilipectus
- Pilosocrures
- Pimprana
- Pinacia
- Pinacoplus
- Pincia
- Pindara
- Pinkericola
- Pippona
- Piratisca
- Pitara
- Pityolita
- Placerobela
- Placonia
- Plagerepne
- Plagideicta
- Plagiomimicus
- Plantea
- Plasmaticus
- Platagarista
- Platagrotis
- Plataplecta
- Plathypena
- Platydasys
- Platyja
- Platyjionia
- Platyperigea
- Platypolia
- Platyprosopa
- Platyscia
- Platysenta
- Plaxia
- Plecoptera
- Plecopterodes
- Plecopteroides
- Pleonectopoda
- Pleonotrocta
- Pleromella
- Pleromelloida
- Pleuromnema
- Pleurona
- Pleuronodes
- Plexiphleps
- Plumipalpia
- Plusia
- Plusidia
- Plusilla
- Plusiodonta
- Plusiopalpa
- Plusiophaes
- Plusiotricha
- Pluxilloides
- Plynteria
- Poaphila
- Podagra
- Poecopa
- Poena
- Poenomia
- Poenopsis
- Poeonoma
- Poesula
- Poeta
- Pogopus
- Polacanthopoda
- Polenta
- Polia
- Policocnemis
- Poliobrya
- Poliodestra
- Poliofoca
- Polionycta
- Polychrysia
- Polydesma
- Polydesmiola
- Polygnamptia
- Polygoniodes
- Polygrammate
- Polygrapta
- Polymixis
- Polyorycta
- Polyphaenis
- Polypogon
- Polysciera
- Polytela
- Polytelodes
- Ponometia
- Poporthosia
- Poppaea
- Porosagrotis
- Porosana
- Porphyrinia
- Porrima
- Poteriophora
- Potnyctycia
- Powellinia
- Pradatta
- Pradiota
- Praestilbia
- Praina
- Prasinopyra
- Praxis
- Premusia
- Prenanthcucullia
- Pricomia
- Prionofrontia
- Prionoptera
- Prionopterina
- Prionoxanthia
- Pristanepa
- Pristoceraea
- Proannaphila
- Prochloridea
- Procoeria
- Proconis
- Procrateria
- Procriosis
- Procus
- Prodenia
- Prodicella
- Prodosia
- Prodotis
- Prognorisma
- Progonia
- Prolitha
- Prolophota
- Proluta
- Prolymnia
- Prolyncestis
- Prometopus
- Prominea
- Promionides
- Promonia
- Pronoctua
- Pronotestra
- Propatria
- Propenistra
- Properigea
- Propolymixis
- Prorachia
- Proragrotis
- Prorivula
- Proroblemma
- Prorocopis
- Proruaca
- Proschora
- Proscrana
- Proseniella
- Prosoparia
- Prospalta
- Prostheta
- Protadisura
- Protagrotis
- Protarache
- Protarchanara
- Proteinania
- Proteuxoa
- Protexarnis
- Protheodes
- Prothrinax
- Protocryphia
- Protodeltote
- Protogygia
- Protolampra
- Protoleucania
- Protomeceras
- Protomeroleuca
- Protomiselia
- Protoperigea
- Protophana
- Protorthodes
- Protoschinia
- Protoschrankia
- Protoseudyra
- Prototrachea
- Provia
- Proxenus
- Psammathodoxa
- Psaphara
- Psaphida
- Psectraglaea
- Psectraxylia
- Psectrotarsia
- Psephea
- Pseudacidalia
- Pseudacontia
- Pseudaglossa
- Pseudagoma
- Pseudalea
- Pseudalelimma
- Pseudaletia
- Pseudalypia
- Pseudamathes
- Pseudanarta
- Pseudanchoscelis
- Pseudanthoecia
- Pseudanthracia
- Pseudaporophyla
- Pseudapospasta
- Pseudarista
- Pseudathetis
- Pseudathyrma
- Pseudbarydia
- Pseudcraspedia
- Pseudelaeodes
- Pseudelyptron
- Pseudenargia
- Pseudephyra
- Pseudepunda
- Pseuderastria
- Pseuderiopus
- Pseudeustrotia
- Pseudeva
- Pseudhypsa
- Pseudina
- Pseudinodes
- Pseudoarcte
- Pseudobendis
- Pseudobryomima
- Pseudobryophila
- Pseudocerura
- Pseudochalcia
- Pseudochropleura
- Pseudocoarica
- Pseudocopicucullia
- Pseudocopivaleria
- Pseudodeltoida
- Pseudodeltote
- Pseudodichromia
- Pseudogerespa
- Pseudogiria
- Pseudoglaea
- Pseudogonitis
- Pseudogyrtona
- Pseudohadena
- Pseudohemiceras
- Pseudohermonassa
- Pseudoleucania
- Pseudoligia
- Pseudolimacodes
- Pseudomecia
- Pseudomicra
- Pseudomicrodes
- Pseudomniotype
- Pseudonycterophaeta
- Pseudopais
- Pseudopanolis
- Pseudophisma
- Pseudophyllophila
- Pseudophyx
- Pseudoplusia
- Pseudopolia
- Pseudopseustis
- Pseudorgyia
- Pseudorthodes
- Pseudorthosia
- Pseudoschrankia
- Pseudoseptis
- Pseudosiccia
- Pseudospaelotis
- Pseudosphetta
- Pseudospiris
- Pseudostella
- Pseudotamila
- Pseudotolna
- Pseudotryphia
- Pseudotuerta
- Pseudoxestia
- Pseudoxylomoea
- Pseudozalissa
- Pseudozarba
- Pseudugia
- Pseudypsia
- Pseudyrias
- Psilomonodes
- Psimada
- Psorya
- Psychomorpha
- Pteraetholix
- Pterhemia
- Pterochaeta
- Pterocyclophora
- Pteronycta
- Pteroprista
- Pteroscia
- Ptichodis
- Ptochosiphla
- Ptyophora
- Ptyopterota
- Ptyornyncha
- Puercala
- Pulcheria
- Pumora
- Purbia
- Puriplusia
- Purpurschinia
- Pusillathetis
- Putagrotis
- Pycnodontis
- Pygmeopolia
- Pygopteryx
- Pyralidesthes
- Pyraloides
- Pyralomorpha
- Pyramarista
- Pyramidcampa
- Pyreferra
- Pyrgeia
- Pyrgion
- Pyripnoa
- Pyroblemma
- Pyrocleptria
- Pyrois
- Pyrrhia
- Pyrrhidivalva
