= Pulcheria (disambiguation) =

Pulcheria (398 or 399 – 453) was an Eastern Roman empress from 450 to 453.

Pulcheria may also refer to:

- Pulcheria (daughter of Theodosius I) (c. 378 – c. 385), daughter of Roman Emperor Theodosius I and Roman Empress Aelia Flaccilla
- Pulcheria (moth), a genus of moths
