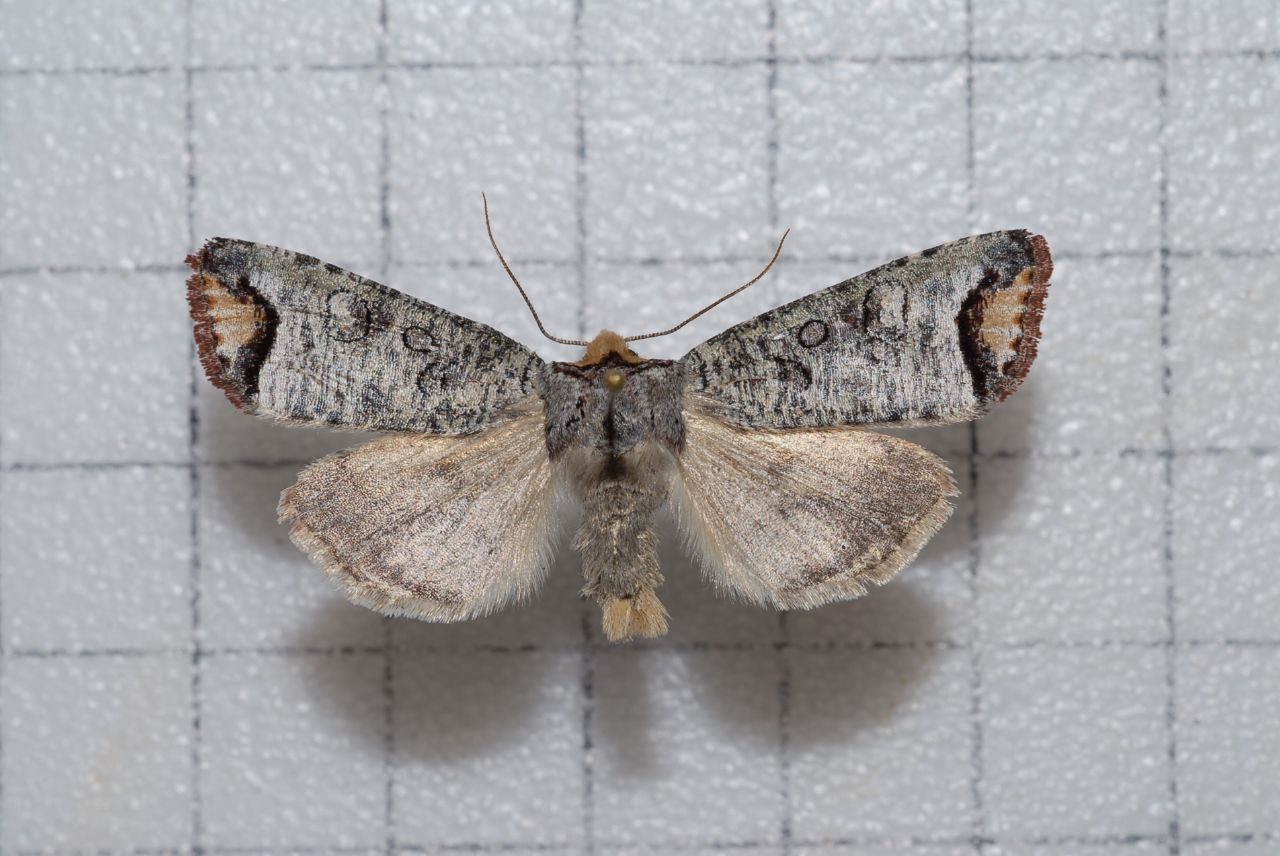

Scientific classification
- Kingdom: Animalia
- Phylum: Arthropoda
- Clade: Pancrustacea
- Class: Insecta
- Order: Lepidoptera
- Superfamily: Noctuoidea
- Family: Noctuidae
- Genus: Pseudopanolis
- Species: P. lala

Binomial name
- Pseudopanolis lala Owada, 1994

= Pseudopanolis lala =

Species of moth

Pseudopanolis lala is a species of moth of the family Noctuidae. It is found in Taiwan.
