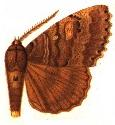

Scientific classification
- Domain: Eukaryota
- Kingdom: Animalia
- Phylum: Arthropoda
- Class: Insecta
- Order: Lepidoptera
- Superfamily: Noctuoidea
- Family: Noctuidae (?)
- Genus: Prionoptera
- Species: P. socorrensis

Binomial name
- Prionoptera socorrensis Dognin, 1912

= Prionoptera socorrensis =

Species of moth

Prionoptera socorrensis is a species of moth of the family Noctuidae first described by Paul Dognin in 1912. It is found in Colombia.
