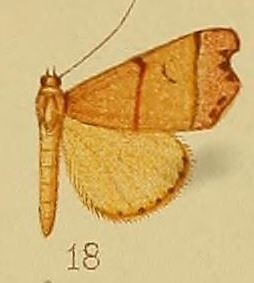

Scientific classification
- Kingdom: Animalia
- Phylum: Arthropoda
- Class: Insecta
- Order: Lepidoptera
- Superfamily: Noctuoidea
- Family: Erebidae
- Genus: Paralephana
- Species: P. nigriciliata

Binomial name
- Paralephana nigriciliata (Hampson, 1910)

Synonyms
- Rhyncodes nigriciliata Hampson, 1910; Lophotavia prunicolora (Hampson, 1910)

= Paralephana nigriciliata =

Species of moth

Paralephana nigriciliata is a moth of the family Erebidae first described by George Hampson in 1910.

== Distribution ==
It is found in Ghana, Tanzania and Zambia.
