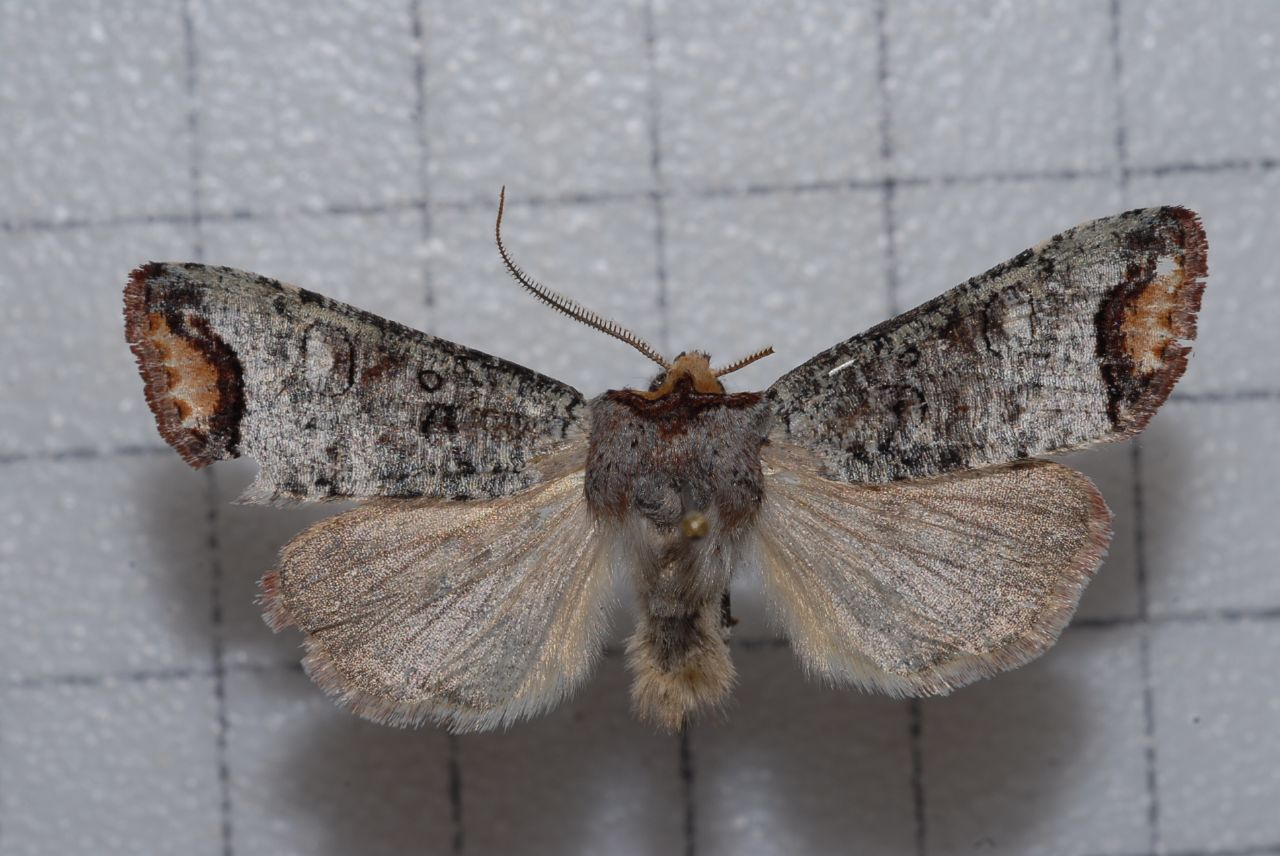

Scientific classification
- Kingdom: Animalia
- Phylum: Arthropoda
- Clade: Pancrustacea
- Class: Insecta
- Order: Lepidoptera
- Superfamily: Noctuoidea
- Family: Noctuidae
- Genus: Pseudopanolis
- Species: P. flavimacula

Binomial name
- Pseudopanolis flavimacula (Wileman, 1912)

Synonyms
- Phalera flavimacula Wileman, 1912

= Pseudopanolis flavimacula =

Species of moth

Pseudopanolis flavimacula is a species of moth of the family Noctuidae. It is found in Taiwan.
