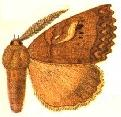

Scientific classification
- Domain: Eukaryota
- Kingdom: Animalia
- Phylum: Arthropoda
- Class: Insecta
- Order: Lepidoptera
- Superfamily: Noctuoidea
- Family: Noctuidae (?)
- Genus: Prionoptera
- Species: P. serraoides

Binomial name
- Prionoptera serraoides Dognin, 1892

= Prionoptera serraoides =

Species of moth

Prionoptera serraoides is a species of moth of the family Noctuidae first described by Paul Dognin in 1892. It is found in Ecuador.
