= Paradiopa postfusca =

Scientific classification
- Kingdom: Animalia
- Phylum: Arthropoda
- Class: Insecta
- Order: Lepidoptera
- Superfamily: Noctuoidea
- Family: Noctuidae
- Genus: Paradiopa
- Species: P. postfusca

Binomial name
- Paradiopa postfusca (Hampson, 1893)

Synonyms
- Episilia postfusca Hampson, 1893

Species of moth

Paradiopa postfusca is a moth of the family Noctuidae first described by George Hampson in 1893. It is found in Sri Lanka and India.

Its forewings are rich brown with lesser white fasciation. Hindwing without a subbasal pale grey patch.
