= Poeonoma =

Scientific classification
- Domain: Eukaryota
- Kingdom: Animalia
- Phylum: Arthropoda
- Class: Insecta
- Order: Lepidoptera
- Superfamily: Noctuoidea
- Family: Noctuidae
- Genus: Poeonoma; Tams & Bowden, 1953

Genus of moths

Poeonoma is a genus of moths of the family Noctuidae.

== Species ==
- Poeonoma acantha Tams & Bowden, 1953
- Poeonoma inermis Laporte, 1973
- Poeonoma nigribasis Laporte, 1974
- Poeonoma serrata (Hampson, 1910)
- Poeonoma similis Tams & Bowden, 1953
