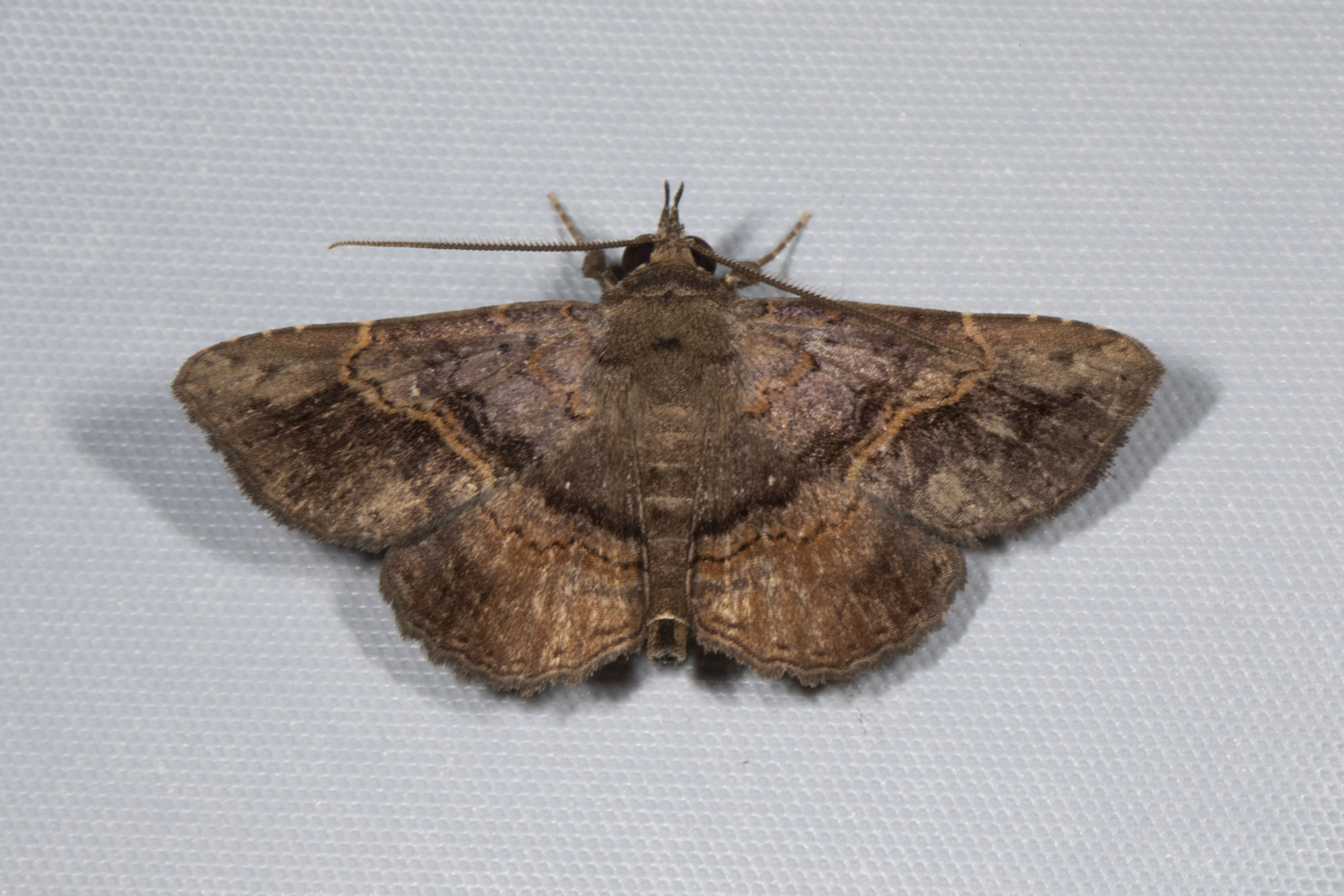
- Phaeoblemma contracta

Scientific classification
- Kingdom: Animalia
- Phylum: Arthropoda
- Clade: Pancrustacea
- Class: Insecta
- Order: Lepidoptera
- Superfamily: Noctuoidea
- Family: Erebidae
- Genus: Phaeoblemma
- Species: Phaeoblemma

Binomial name
- Phaeoblemma Hampson, 1926

= Phaeoblemma =

Genus of moths

Phaeoblemma is a genus of moths in the family Erebidae. The genus was erected by George Hampson in 1926.

== Species ==
- Phaeoblemma amabilis (Möschler, 1880) - Peru, Suriname
- Phaeoblemma contracta (Walker, 1865) - Brazil, Costa Rica
- Phaeoblemma dares (Stoll, [1782]) - Suriname
- Phaeoblemma pascoana Barbut & Lalanne-Cassou, 2006 - Peru
- Phaeoblemma undina (Felder & Rogenhofer, 1874) - French Guiana
