= Palpirectia =

Scientific classification
- Domain: Eukaryota
- Kingdom: Animalia
- Phylum: Arthropoda
- Class: Insecta
- Order: Lepidoptera
- Superfamily: Noctuoidea
- Family: Erebidae
- Subfamily: Herminiinae
- Genus: Palpirectia; Berio, 1977
- Species: P. videns

Binomial name
- Palpirectia videns Berio, 1977

Genus of moths

Palpirectia is a monotypic moth genus in the family Erebidae. Its only species, Palpirectia videns, is found in China. Both the genus and the species were first described by Emilio Berio in 1977.
