= Pseudochalcia =

Scientific classification
- Domain: Eukaryota
- Kingdom: Animalia
- Phylum: Arthropoda
- Class: Insecta
- Order: Lepidoptera
- Superfamily: Noctuoidea
- Family: Noctuidae
- Subfamily: Plusiinae
- Genus: Pseudochalcia; Klyuchko, 1984

Genus of moths

Pseudochalcia is a genus of moths of the family Noctuidae.

== Species ==
- Pseudochalcia aranka Hacker & Ronkay, 1992
- Pseudochalcia inconspicua Graeser, 1888
- Pseudochalcia shugnana Sheljuzhko, 1929
