= Palaeosafia =

Scientific classification
- Domain: Eukaryota
- Kingdom: Animalia
- Phylum: Arthropoda
- Class: Insecta
- Order: Lepidoptera
- Superfamily: Noctuoidea
- Family: Noctuidae (?)
- Subfamily: Catocalinae
- Genus: Palaeosafia; Draudt, 1950
- Species: P. hoenei

Binomial name
- Palaeosafia hoenei Draudt, 1950

Genus of moths

Palaeosafia is a monotypic moth genus of the family Noctuidae. Its only species, Palaeosafia hoenei, is found in Yunnan, China. Both the genus and the species were first described by Max Wilhelm Karl Draudt in 1950.
