= Poenopsis =

Scientific classification
- Domain: Eukaryota
- Kingdom: Animalia
- Phylum: Arthropoda
- Class: Insecta
- Order: Lepidoptera
- Superfamily: Noctuoidea
- Family: Erebidae
- Subfamily: Herminiinae
- Genus: Poenopsis; Dyar, 1922
- Species: P. abstrusa

Binomial name
- Poenopsis abstrusa Dyar, 1922

Genus of moths

Poenopsis is a monotypic moth genus of the family Erebidae. Its only species, Poenopsis abstrusa, is known from Mexico. Both the genus and the species were first described by Harrison Gray Dyar Jr. in 1922.
