= Parangitia =

- Parangitia circumcincta

Scientific classification
- Kingdom: Animalia
- Phylum: Arthropoda
- Clade: Pancrustacea
- Class: Insecta
- Order: Lepidoptera
- Superfamily: Noctuoidea
- Family: Noctuidae
- Subfamily: Acontiinae
- Genus: Parangitia; H. Druce, 1909

Genus of moths

Parangitia is a genus of moths in the family Noctuidae. The genus was erected by Herbert Druce in 1909.

== Species ==
- Parangitia atys Schaus, 1914 French Guiana
- Parangitia cana (H. Druce, 1909) Peru
- Parangitia carrioni (Dogin, 1890) Ecuador
- Parangitia centrochalca Dyar, 1914 Mexico
- Parangitia cervina Hampson, 1910 Guyana
- Parangitia chlorosticta Schaus, 1914 French Guiana
- Parangitia circumcincta Dyar, 1914 Panama
- Parangitia corma Schaus, 1921 Guatemala
- Parangitia diaperas Dognin, 1914 French Guiana
- Parangitia grisescens Hampson, 1910 Panama
- Parangitia guanacaste Schaus, 1911 Costa Rica
- Parangitia micapennis Kaye, 1922 Trinidad
- Parangitia micrina Berio, 1966 Tanzania, Zaire, Madagascar
- Parangitia mosaica Dyar, 1914 Mexico
- Parangitia mulator Schaus, 1921 Guatemala
- Parangitia nephelistis Hampson, 1910 Brazil (Amazonas, Pará)
- Parangitia nigrofulgens Kaye, 1922 Trinidad
- Parangitia rufa (H. Druce, 1909) Peru
- Parangitia subrufescens (Kaye, 1901) Trinidad
- Parangitia temperata Schaus, 1911 Costa Rica
- Parangitia veluta H. Druce, 1909 Peru
- Parangitia virescens (H. Druce, 1909) Peru
