= Pterhemia =

Scientific classification
- Kingdom: Animalia
- Phylum: Arthropoda
- Class: Insecta
- Order: Lepidoptera
- Superfamily: Noctuoidea
- Family: Erebidae
- Subfamily: Calpinae
- Genus: Pterhemia; Guenée in Boisduval & Guenée, 1854

Synonyms
- Pessida Walker, 1858

Genus of moths

Pterhemia is a genus of moths of the family Erebidae. The genus was erected by Achille Guenée in 1854.

== Species ==
- Pterhemia ameriola Druce, 1890 Panama
- Pterhemia exscissa Schaus, 1913 Costa Rica
- Pterhemia monogramma Hampson, 1926 Venezuela
- Pterhemia mutilatalis Guenée, 1854 Brazil (Pará), French Guiana
- Pterhemia schausialis Dognin, 1914 Ecuador
- Pterhemia uncinalis (Geyer, 832) West Indies, Brazil (Rio de Janeiro)
