= Pseudypsia =

Scientific classification
- Domain: Eukaryota
- Kingdom: Animalia
- Phylum: Arthropoda
- Class: Insecta
- Order: Lepidoptera
- Superfamily: Noctuoidea
- Family: Erebidae
- Subfamily: Calpinae
- Genus: Pseudypsia; Dognin, 1900
- Species: P. dilectata

Binomial name
- Pseudypsia dilectata Dognin, 1900

Monotypic genus of moths

Pseudypsia is a monotypic moth genus of the family Erebidae. Its only species, Pseudypsia dilectata, is found in Ecuador. Both the genus and species were first described by Paul Dognin in 1900.
