= Poecopa =

Scientific classification
- Domain: Eukaryota
- Kingdom: Animalia
- Phylum: Arthropoda
- Class: Insecta
- Order: Lepidoptera
- Superfamily: Noctuoidea
- Family: Noctuidae
- Genus: Poecopa; Bowden, 1956

Genus of moths

Poecopa is a genus of moths of the family Noctuidae.

== Species ==
- Poecopa mediopuncta Bowden, 1956
