= Psorya =

Scientific classification
- Domain: Eukaryota
- Kingdom: Animalia
- Phylum: Arthropoda
- Class: Insecta
- Order: Lepidoptera
- Superfamily: Noctuoidea
- Family: Erebidae
- Subfamily: Calpinae
- Genus: Psorya; Schaus, 1923
- Species: P. hadesia

Binomial name
- Psorya hadesia Schaus, 1923

Genus of moths

Psorya is a monotypic moth genus of the family Erebidae. Its only species, Psorya hadesia, is found on the Galápagos Islands. Both the genus and species were first described by William Schaus in 1923.
