= Protomeroleuca =

Scientific classification
- Domain: Eukaryota
- Kingdom: Animalia
- Phylum: Arthropoda
- Class: Insecta
- Order: Lepidoptera
- Superfamily: Noctuoidea
- Family: Noctuidae
- Genus: Protomeroleuca; Berio, 1966
- Species: P. perlides

Binomial name
- Protomeroleuca perlides Berio, 1966

Genus of moths

Protomeroleuca is a monotypic genus of moths of the family Noctuidae. It contains only the species Protomeroleuca perlides from Madagascar.
