= Polysciera =

Scientific classification
- Kingdom: Animalia
- Phylum: Arthropoda
- Class: Insecta
- Order: Lepidoptera
- Superfamily: Noctuoidea
- Family: Erebidae
- Subfamily: Calpinae
- Genus: Polysciera; Hampson, 1926
- Species: P. manleyi

Binomial name
- Polysciera manleyi (Leech, 1900)

Synonyms
- Egnasia manleyi Leech, 1900

Genus of moths

Polysciera is a monotypic moth genus of the family Erebidae erected by George Hampson in 1926. Its only species, Polysciera manleyi, was first described by John Henry Leech in 1900. It is found in Japan and Russia.
