= Proconis =

Scientific classification
- Kingdom: Animalia
- Phylum: Arthropoda
- Class: Insecta
- Order: Lepidoptera
- Superfamily: Noctuoidea
- Family: Erebidae
- Subfamily: Calpinae
- Genus: Proconis; Hampson, 1902

Genus of moths

Proconis is a genus of moths of the family Erebidae. The genus was erected by George Hampson in 1902.

== Species ==
- Proconis anaerygidia (Berio, 1984) Djibouti
- Proconis abrostoloides Hampson, 1902 Zimbabwe
- Proconis forsteri Hacker, 2016 Tanzania
- Proconis ochrosia (Hampson, 1926) Saudi Arabia, Sudan
- Proconis politzari (Hacker & Hausmann, 2010) Mauritania, Nigeria, Niger
