= Prodosia mycha =

Scientific classification
- Kingdom: Animalia
- Phylum: Arthropoda
- Class: Insecta
- Order: Lepidoptera
- Superfamily: Noctuoidea
- Family: Noctuidae
- Subfamily: Acontiinae
- Genus: Prodosia; Dyar, 1914
- Species: P. mycha

Binomial name
- Prodosia mycha Dyar, 1914

Species of moth

Prodosia mycha is the only species in the monotypic moth genus Prodosia of the family Noctuidae. It is found in Panama. Both the genus and species were first described by Harrison Gray Dyar Jr. in 1914.
