= Polygoniodes =

Scientific classification
- Kingdom: Animalia
- Phylum: Arthropoda
- Class: Insecta
- Order: Lepidoptera
- Superfamily: Noctuoidea
- Family: Erebidae
- Subfamily: Calpinae
- Genus: Polygoniodes; Hampson, 1926

Genus of moths

Polygoniodes is a genus of moths of the family Erebidae. The genus was erected by George Hampson in 1926.

== Species ==
- Polygoniodes furva Schaus, 1912
- Polygoniodes laciniata (Felder & Rogenhofer, 1874)
- Polygoniodes pallidipes Schaus, 1911
- Polygoniodes terraba Schaus, 1911
