= Pseudarista =

Scientific classification
- Domain: Eukaryota
- Kingdom: Animalia
- Phylum: Arthropoda
- Class: Insecta
- Order: Lepidoptera
- Superfamily: Noctuoidea
- Family: Erebidae
- Subfamily: Herminiinae
- Genus: Pseudarista; Schaus, 1916

Genus of moths

Pseudarista is a genus of moths of the family Noctuidae. The genus was erected by Schaus in 1916.

== Species ==
- Pseudarista geldersi Schaus, 1916 Suriname
- Pseudarista pagasusalis (Walker, 1859) Brazil
- Pseudarista spiosalis (Walker, [1859]) Venezuela
