= Rhangena =

Scientific classification
- Domain: Eukaryota
- Kingdom: Animalia
- Phylum: Arthropoda
- Class: Insecta
- Order: Lepidoptera
- Superfamily: Noctuoidea
- Family: Erebidae
- Subfamily: Calpinae
- Genus: Rhangena; Moore, [1886]
- Species: R. roseipennis

Binomial name
- Rhangena roseipennis Moore, [1886]

Synonyms
- Generic: Phycidimorpha Hampson, 1893; Specific: Phycidimorpha rosea Hampson, 1893

Genus of moths

Rhangena is a monotypic moth genus of the family Erebidae. Its only species, Rhangena roseipennis, is found in India and Sri Lanka. Both the genus and the species were first described by Frederic Moore in 1886.

== Description ==
The synonym Phycidimorpha was described: Its eyes are naked and without lashes. The palpi are porrect (extending forward) and reach beyond the frons. Antennae with long bristles and cilia. Thorax and abdomen tuftless. Tibia naked and spineless. Forewings very long and narrow. Outer margin very oblique. Vein 7 given off after the areole. Hindwings with veins 3 and 4 on a short stalk. Vein 5 straight and from below center of discocellulars.
