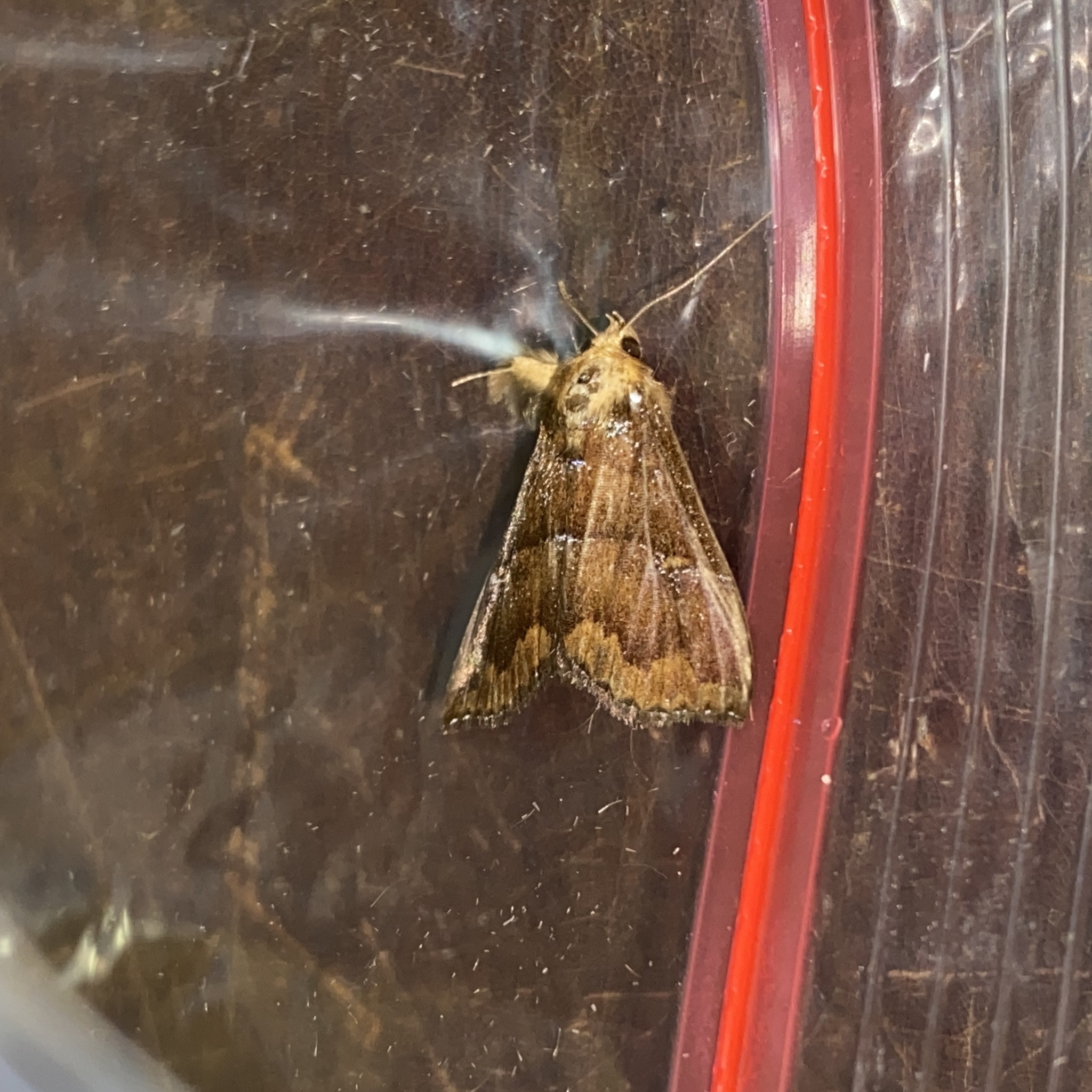
- Pseudostella cyanolepia

Scientific classification
- Kingdom: Animalia
- Phylum: Arthropoda
- Clade: Pancrustacea
- Class: Insecta
- Order: Lepidoptera
- Superfamily: Noctuoidea
- Family: Erebidae
- Subfamily: Calpinae
- Genus: Pseudostella; Hampson, 1926

= Pseudostella =

Genus of moths

Pseudostella is a genus of moths in the family Erebidae. The genus was erected by George Hampson in 1926.

== Species ==
- Pseudostella cyanolepia Kaye, 1907
- Pseudostella oenone Schaus
- Pseudostella pegasis Schaus, 1912
