= Pseudelaeodes =

Scientific classification
- Domain: Eukaryota
- Kingdom: Animalia
- Phylum: Arthropoda
- Class: Insecta
- Order: Lepidoptera
- Superfamily: Noctuoidea
- Family: Noctuidae
- Genus: Pseudelaeodes; Viette, 1965

Type species
- Elaeodes proteoides Kenrick, 1917

Genus of moths

Pseudelaeodes is a genus of moths of the family Noctuidae.

== Species ==
- Pseudelaeodes proteoides (Kenrick, 1917)
- Pseudelaeodes sogai Viette, 1969
