= Poena (moth) =

Scientific classification
- Domain: Eukaryota
- Kingdom: Animalia
- Phylum: Arthropoda
- Class: Insecta
- Order: Lepidoptera
- Superfamily: Noctuoidea
- Family: Erebidae
- Subfamily: Calpinae
- Genus: Poena; H. Druce in Godman & Salvin, 1891

Genus of moths

Poena is a genus of moths of the family Erebidae. The genus was erected by Herbert Druce in 1891.

The Global Lepidoptera Names Index gives this name as a synonym of Arugisa Walker, 1865.

== Species ==
- Poena albomarginata H. Druce, 1891 Mexico, Guatemala
- Poena drucella Nye, 1975 Guatemala
- Poena hirsuta Schaus, 1916 Suriname
