= Plynteria (moth) =

Scientific classification
- Domain: Eukaryota
- Kingdom: Animalia
- Phylum: Arthropoda
- Class: Insecta
- Order: Lepidoptera
- Superfamily: Noctuoidea
- Family: Erebidae
- Subfamily: Calpinae
- Genus: Plynteria; H. Druce in Godman & Salvin, 1891

Genus of moths

Plynteria is a genus of moths of the family Erebidae. The genus was erected by Herbert Druce in 1891.

== Species ==
- Plynteria centriponens Dyar, 1914 Panama
- Plynteria conformens Dyar, 1914 Panama
- Plynteria contenta Dyar, 1914 Panama
- Plynteria coryphata Dyar, 1914 Panama
- Plynteria costata Schaus, 1912 Costa Rica
- Plynteria dilmis Dyar, 1914 Panama
- Plynteria extirpens Dyar, 1914 Panama
- Plynteria florens Schaus, 1912 Costa Rica
- Plynteria irrespondens Dyar, 1914 Panama
- Plynteria lineata H. Druce, 1891 Panama
- Plynteria maises Dyar, 1914 Panama
- Plynteria marginata H. Druce, 1891 Panama
- Plynteria melanopasa Dyar, 1914 Panama
- Plynteria stellata Schaus, 1912 Costa Rica
- Plynteria unifacta Dyar, 1914 Panama
