= Paranataelia =

Scientific classification
- Domain: Eukaryota
- Kingdom: Animalia
- Phylum: Arthropoda
- Class: Insecta
- Order: Lepidoptera
- Superfamily: Noctuoidea
- Family: Noctuidae
- Genus: Paranataelia; Draudt, 1935

Genus of moths

Paranataelia is a genus of moths of the family Noctuidae.

== Species ==
- Paranataelia tenerifica (Hampson, 1906)
- Paranataelia whitei (Rebel, 1906)
