= Pseudosiccia =

Scientific classification
- Domain: Eukaryota
- Kingdom: Animalia
- Phylum: Arthropoda
- Class: Insecta
- Order: Lepidoptera
- Superfamily: Noctuoidea
- Family: Noctuidae
- Subfamily: Acontiinae
- Genus: Pseudosiccia; Roepke, 1956
- Species: P. lichenaria

Binomial name
- Pseudosiccia lichenaria Roepke, 1956

Genus of moths

Pseudosiccia is a monotypic moth genus of the family Noctuidae. Its only species, Pseudosiccia lichenaria, is found in western Java. Both the genus and species were first described by Roepke in 1956.
