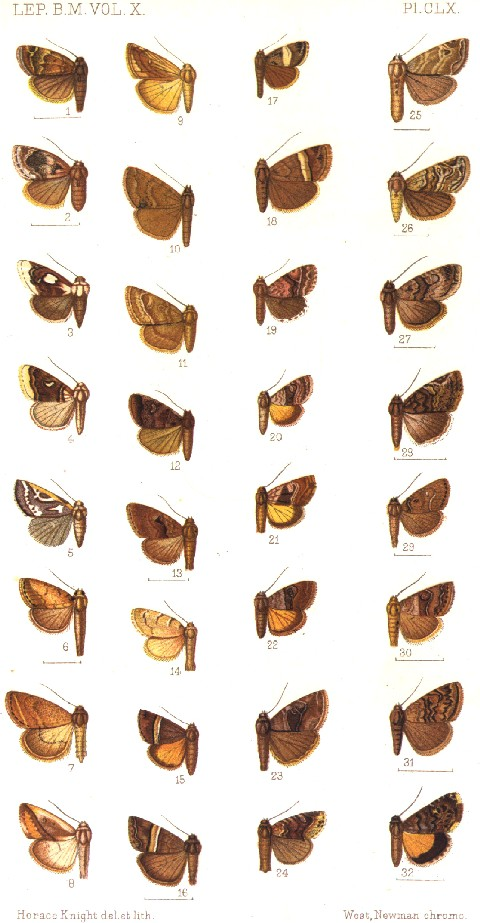

Scientific classification
- Kingdom: Animalia
- Phylum: Arthropoda
- Class: Insecta
- Order: Lepidoptera
- Superfamily: Noctuoidea
- Family: Noctuidae
- Subfamily: Eustrotiinae
- Genus: Protarache; Hampson, 1910

= Protarache =

Genus of moths

Protarache is a genus of moths of the family Noctuidae. The genus was erected by George Hampson in 1910.

== Species ==
- Protarache annulata Wileman & West, 1929 Philippines (Luzon)
- Protarache eulepidea (Hampson, 1896) Sri Lanka
- Protarache polygrapha Berio, 1950 Eritrea
