= Paracaroides =

Scientific classification
- Domain: Eukaryota
- Kingdom: Animalia
- Phylum: Arthropoda
- Class: Insecta
- Order: Lepidoptera
- Superfamily: Noctuoidea
- Family: Noctuidae
- Genus: Paracaroides; Kenrick, 1917

Genus of moths

Paracaroides is a genus of moths of the family Noctuidae.

== Species ==
- Paracaroides befasy Viette, 1960
- Paracaroides behara Viette, 1960
- Paracaroides janineae Viette, 1958
- Paracaroides louveli Viette, 1969
- Paracaroides pauliani Viette, 1958
- Paracaroides pratti Kenrick, 1917
- Paracaroides sublota (Mabille, 1900)
- Paracaroides vaovao Viette, 1972
