= Pelecia =

Scientific classification
- Kingdom: Animalia
- Phylum: Arthropoda
- Clade: Pancrustacea
- Class: Insecta
- Order: Lepidoptera
- Superfamily: Noctuoidea
- Family: Erebidae
- Subfamily: Calpinae
- Genus: Pelecia; Hübner, 1821
- Species: P. retusalis

Binomial name
- Pelecia retusalis (Hübner, [1818])

Synonyms
- Idia retusalis Hübner, [1818]

Genus of moths

Pelecia is a monotypic moth genus of the family Erebidae. Its only species, Pelecia retusalis, is found in Brazil. Both the genus and species were first described by Jacob Hübner, the genus in 1821 and the species three years earlier in 1818.
