= Paragabara =

Scientific classification
- Kingdom: Animalia
- Phylum: Arthropoda
- Class: Insecta
- Order: Lepidoptera
- Superfamily: Noctuoidea
- Family: Erebidae
- Subfamily: Calpinae
- Genus: Paragabara; Hampson, 1926

Genus of moths

Paragabara is a genus of moths of the family Erebidae and subfamily of Calpinae. The genus was erected by George Hampson in 1926.

== Species ==
- Paragabara acygonia (Hampson, 1898) India (Himachal Pradesh)
- Paragabara biundata Hampson, 1926 Sichuan
- Paragabara curvicornuta Kononenko, Han & Matov, 2010 Korea, ...
- Paragabara flavomacula (Oberthür, 1880) Korea, Japan, south-east Siberia
- Paragabara ochreipennis Sugi, 1962 south-east Siberia, Japan
- Paragabara pectinata (Leech, 1900) China
