= Pennalticola =

Scientific classification
- Domain: Eukaryota
- Kingdom: Animalia
- Phylum: Arthropoda
- Class: Insecta
- Order: Lepidoptera
- Superfamily: Noctuoidea
- Family: Noctuidae
- Subfamily: Acontiinae
- Genus: Pennalticola; Berio, 1973
- Species: P. rectangulum

Binomial name
- Pennalticola rectangulum Berio, 1973

Genus of moths

Pennalticola is a monotypic moth genus of the family Noctuidae. Its only species, Pennalticola rectangulum, is found in Myanmar. Both the genus and species were first described by Emilio Berio in 1973.
