= Prionofrontia =

Scientific classification
- Kingdom: Animalia
- Phylum: Arthropoda
- Class: Insecta
- Order: Lepidoptera
- Superfamily: Noctuoidea
- Family: Erebidae
- Subfamily: Calpinae
- Genus: Prionofrontia; Hampson, 1902

Genus of moths

Prionofrontia is a genus of moths of the family Erebidae. The genus was erected by George Hampson in 1902.

== Species ==
- Prionofrontia erygidia Hampson, 1902
- Prionofrontia nyctiscia Hampson, 1926
- Prionofrontia ochrosia Hampson, 1926
- Prionofrontia strigata Hampson, 1926
