= Pseudugia =

Scientific classification
- Kingdom: Animalia
- Phylum: Arthropoda
- Class: Insecta
- Order: Lepidoptera
- Superfamily: Noctuoidea
- Family: Erebidae
- Subfamily: Calpinae
- Genus: Pseudugia; D. S. Fletcher & Viette, 1955
- Species: P. bistriata

Binomial name
- Pseudugia bistriata D. S. Fletcher & Viette, 1955

Genus of moths

Pseudugia is a monotypic moth genus of the family Erebidae. Its only species, Pseudugia bistriata, is found in Guinea. Both the genus and species were first described by David Stephen Fletcher and Pierre Viette in 1955.
