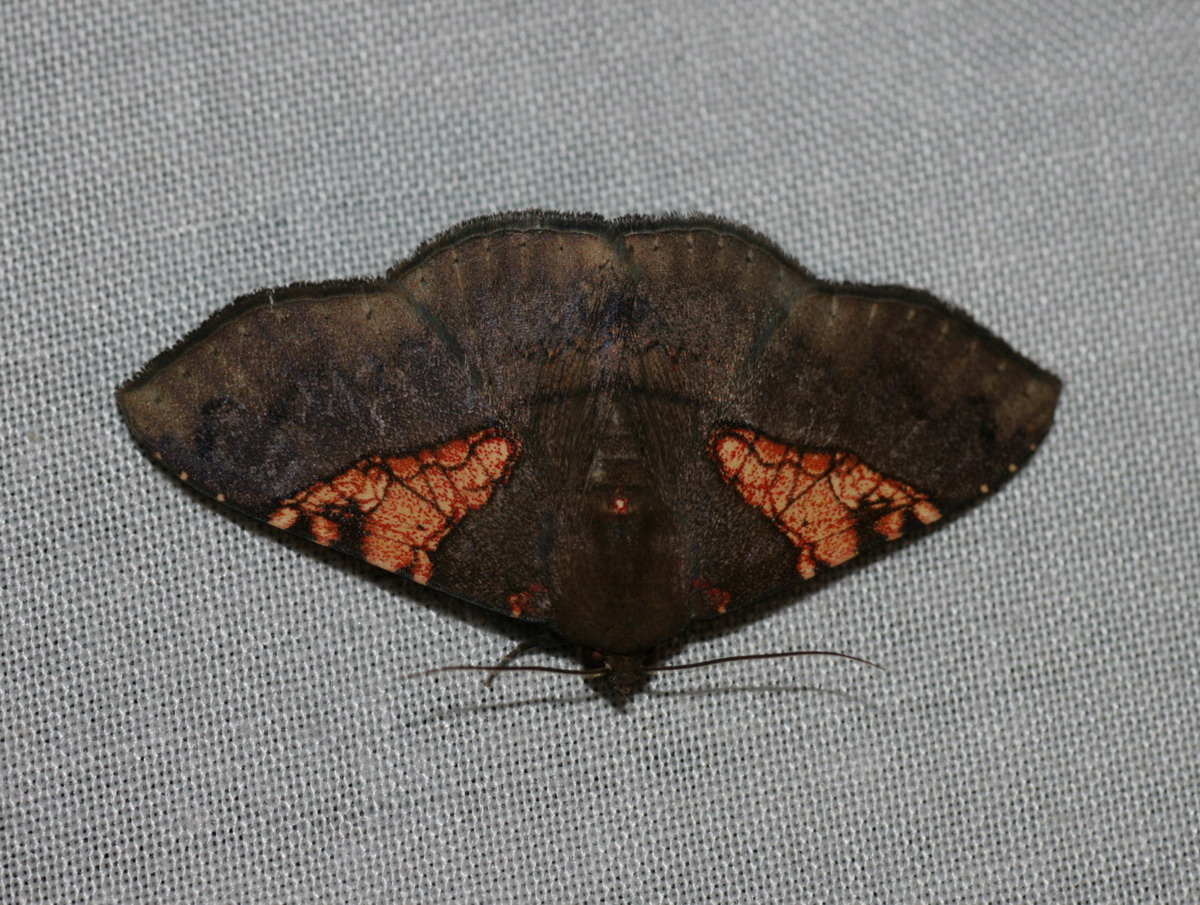
- Platyjionia aff. mediorufa (Noctuidae Catocalinae)

Scientific classification
- Kingdom: Animalia
- Phylum: Arthropoda
- Clade: Pancrustacea
- Class: Insecta
- Order: Lepidoptera
- Superfamily: Noctuoidea
- Family: Erebidae
- Subfamily: Calpinae
- Genus: Platyjionia; Hampson, 1926
- Species: P. mediorufa

Binomial name
- Platyjionia mediorufa (Hampson, 1894)

Synonyms
- Thermesia mediorufa Hampson, 1894; Platyja sada Swinhoe, 1903; Capnodes brunnea Swinhoe, 1906

= Platyjionia =

Genus of moths

Platyjionia is a monotypic moth genus of the family Erebidae. Its only species, Platyjionia mediorufa, is found in the north-eastern Himalayas, Thailand, Peninsular Malaysia, Sumatra and Borneo. Both the genus and species were first described by George Hampson, the genus in 1926 and the species in 1894.
