= Powellinia =

Scientific classification
- Domain: Eukaryota
- Kingdom: Animalia
- Phylum: Arthropoda
- Class: Insecta
- Order: Lepidoptera
- Superfamily: Noctuoidea
- Family: Noctuidae
- Subfamily: Noctuinae
- Genus: Powellinia; Oberthür, 1912

Genus of moths

Powellinia is a genus of moths of the family Noctuidae. It is now mostly considered a subgenus of Agrotis.

== Species ==
- Powellinia boetica (Rambur, [1837])
- Powellinia lasserrei (Oberthür, 1881)
- Powellinia pierreti (Bugnion, 1838)
