= Pangraptella =

Scientific classification
- Kingdom: Animalia
- Phylum: Arthropoda
- Class: Insecta
- Order: Lepidoptera
- Superfamily: Noctuoidea
- Family: Erebidae
- Subfamily: Calpinae
- Genus: Pangraptella; Hampson, 1926
- Species: P. herbitecta

Binomial name
- Pangraptella herbitecta (Dyar, 1913)

Synonyms
- Pangrapta herbitecta Dyar, 1913

Genus of moths

Pangraptella is a monotypic moth genus of the family Erebidae erected by George Hampson in 1926. Its only species, Pangraptella herbitecta, was first described by Harrison Gray Dyar Jr. in 1913. It is found in Mexico.
