= Phrodita =

Scientific classification
- Kingdom: Animalia
- Phylum: Arthropoda
- Clade: Pancrustacea
- Class: Insecta
- Order: Lepidoptera
- Superfamily: Noctuoidea
- Family: Erebidae
- Subfamily: Calpinae
- Genus: Phrodita; Schaus, 1898

Synonyms
- Phrodita Hampson, 1926

Genus of moths

Phrodita is a genus of moths of the family Erebidae. The genus was described by William Schaus in 1898. Both species are found in the Brazilian state of Paraná.

== Species ==
- Phrodita bilinea Schaus, 1898
- Phrodita fasciata Jones, 1908
