= Phycopterus =

Scientific classification
- Kingdom: Animalia
- Phylum: Arthropoda
- Class: Insecta
- Order: Lepidoptera
- Superfamily: Noctuoidea
- Family: Erebidae
- Subfamily: Calpinae
- Genus: Phycopterus; Blanchard in Gay, 1852

Genus of moths

Phycopterus is a genus of moths of the family Erebidae first described by Émile Blanchard in 1852. The species are all found in Chile.

It was described as: Body fairly slender. Head short, rounded. Protruding eyes. Setaceous (bristled) antennae in both sexes, simple, somewhat more dense in males than in females. Palpi three times longer than the head, rights(?), pointed and very flaky, with the last joint with a pointed end, almost acute. Oblong thorax. Forewings rather broad, nearly triangular, almost straight terminal edge. Hindwing rounded. Legs thin and very long. Abdomen conical.

== Species ==
- Phycopterus flavellus Blanchard, 1852 – type species
- Phycopterus rubritincta Hampson, 1926
- Phycopterus signariellus Blanchard, 1852
