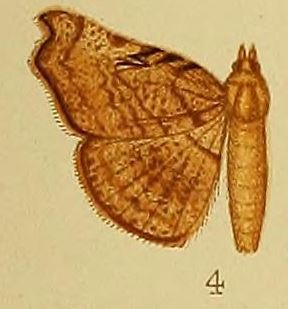
- Pleuronodes trogopera

Scientific classification
- Kingdom: Animalia
- Phylum: Arthropoda
- Class: Insecta
- Order: Lepidoptera
- Superfamily: Noctuoidea
- Family: Erebidae
- Subfamily: Calpinae
- Genus: Pleuronodes; Hampson, 1926

= Pleuronodes =

Genus of moths

Pleuronodes is a genus of moths of the family Erebidae. The genus was erected by George Hampson in 1926.

== Species ==
- Pleuronodes arida Hampson, 1902
- Pleuronodes lepticyma Hampson, 1909
- Pleuronodes odorino Bryk, 1915
- Pleuronodes plexifera Hampson, 1926
- Pleuronodes trogopera Hampson, 1910
