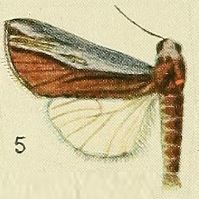

Scientific classification
- Kingdom: Animalia
- Phylum: Arthropoda
- Class: Insecta
- Order: Lepidoptera
- Superfamily: Noctuoidea
- Family: Noctuidae
- Genus: Poppaea; Fawcett, 1916
- Species: P. sabina

Binomial name
- Poppaea sabina Fawcett, 1916

= Poppaea (moth) =

Genus of moths

Poppaea is a genus of moths of the family Noctuidae containing the sole species Poppaea sabina, known from East Africa. The moth's namesake was most likely Roman emperor Nero's second wife, Poppaea Sabina.
