= Plagideicta =

Scientific classification
- Missing taxonomy template (fix): Plagideicta

Genus of moths

Plagideicta is a genus of moths of the family Noctuidae.
