= Pseudogerespa =

Scientific classification
- Kingdom: Animalia
- Phylum: Arthropoda
- Class: Insecta
- Order: Lepidoptera
- Superfamily: Noctuoidea
- Family: Erebidae
- Subfamily: Calpinae
- Genus: Pseudogerespa; Hampson, 1926

Genus of moths

Pseudogerespa is a genus of moths of the order Erebidae. The genus was erected by George Hampson in 1926.

== Species ==
- Pseudogerespa adjutus (Dognin, 1912) Colombia
- Pseudogerespa diopis Hampson, 1926 Colombia
- Pseudogerespa fannius (Dognin, 1912) Ecuador
- Pseudogerespa niviferus (Dognin, 1912) Colombia
- Pseudogerespa usipetes (Druce, 1898) Mexico, Costa Rica
