= Palaechthona =

Scientific classification
- Kingdom: Animalia
- Phylum: Arthropoda
- Class: Insecta
- Order: Lepidoptera
- Superfamily: Noctuoidea
- Family: Erebidae
- Subfamily: Calpinae
- Genus: Palaechthona; Hampson, 1926
- Species: P. hypoleuca

Binomial name
- Palaechthona hypoleuca (Dognin, 1914)

Synonyms
- Barcita hypoleuca Dognin, 1914

Genus of moths

Palaechthona is a monotypic moth genus of the family Erebidae erected by George Hampson in 1926. Its only species, Palaechthona hypoleuca, was first described by Paul Dognin in 1914. It is found in Peru.
