= Pseudophisma =

Scientific classification
- Kingdom: Animalia
- Phylum: Arthropoda
- Class: Insecta
- Order: Lepidoptera
- Superfamily: Noctuoidea
- Family: Erebidae
- Subfamily: Calpinae
- Genus: Pseudophisma; Hampson, 1926

Genus of moths

Pseudophisma is a genus of moths of the family Erebidae. The genus was erected by George Hampson in 1926.

== Species ==
- Pseudophisma aeolida H. Druce, 1890
- Pseudophisma delunaris H. Druce
- Pseudophisma diatonica Möschler, 1880
- Pseudophisma pritanis Cramer, 1779
- Pseudophisma sinuata Schaus, 1901
