= Paracoeria =

Scientific classification
- Kingdom: Animalia
- Phylum: Arthropoda
- Class: Insecta
- Order: Lepidoptera
- Superfamily: Noctuoidea
- Family: Erebidae
- Subfamily: Calpinae
- Genus: Paracoeria; Hampson, 1926

Genus of moths

Paracoeria is a genus of moths of the family Erebidae. The genus was erected by George Hampson in 1926.

== Species ==
- Paracoeria atridisca Hampson, 1926 Brazil (Rio de Janeiro)
- Paracoeria orobena (H. Druce, 1891) Panama
