= Ptyopterota =

Scientific classification
- Kingdom: Animalia
- Phylum: Arthropoda
- Class: Insecta
- Order: Lepidoptera
- Superfamily: Noctuoidea
- Family: Noctuidae
- Subfamily: Acontiinae
- Genus: Ptyopterota; Hampson, 1894
- Species: P. obscura

Binomial name
- Ptyopterota obscura Hampson, 1894

Genus of moths

Ptyopterota is a monotypic moth genus of the family Noctuidae. Its only species, Ptyopterota obscura, is found in Myanmar. Both the genus and species were first described by George Hampson in 1894.
