= Phorica =

Scientific classification
- Kingdom: Animalia
- Phylum: Arthropoda
- Class: Insecta
- Order: Lepidoptera
- Superfamily: Noctuoidea
- Family: Erebidae
- Subfamily: Calpinae
- Genus: Phorica; Walker, 1858
- Species: P. phasipennis

Binomial name
- Phorica phasipennis Walker, 1858

Genus of moths

Phorica is a monotypic moth genus of the family Erebidae. Its only species, Phorica phasipennis, is found in India, Peninsular Malaysia, Sumatra, Borneo and Sulawesi. Both the genus and species were first described by Francis Walker in 1858.
