= Plumipalpia =

Scientific classification
- Kingdom: Animalia
- Phylum: Arthropoda
- Class: Insecta
- Order: Lepidoptera
- Superfamily: Noctuoidea
- Family: Erebidae
- Subfamily: Hypeninae
- Genus: Plumipalpia; Hampson, 1898

Genus of moths

Plumipalpia is a genus of moths of the family Erebidae. The genus was erected by George Hampson in 1898.

== Species ==
- Plumipalpia lignicolor Hampson, 1898 India (Himachal Pradesh)
- Plumipalpia simplex Leech, 1900 China
