= Polygrapta =

Scientific classification
- Kingdom: Animalia
- Phylum: Arthropoda
- Class: Insecta
- Order: Lepidoptera
- Superfamily: Noctuoidea
- Family: Erebidae
- Subfamily: Calpinae
- Genus: Polygrapta; Hampson, 1926

Genus of moths

Polygrapta is a genus of moths of the family Erebidae. The genus was erected by George Hampson in 1926.

== Species ==
- Polygrapta albipuncta Gaede, 1939 Cameroon
- Polygrapta angulilinea Gaede, 1939 Cameroon
- Polygrapta argyropasta Hampson, 1926 Ghana
