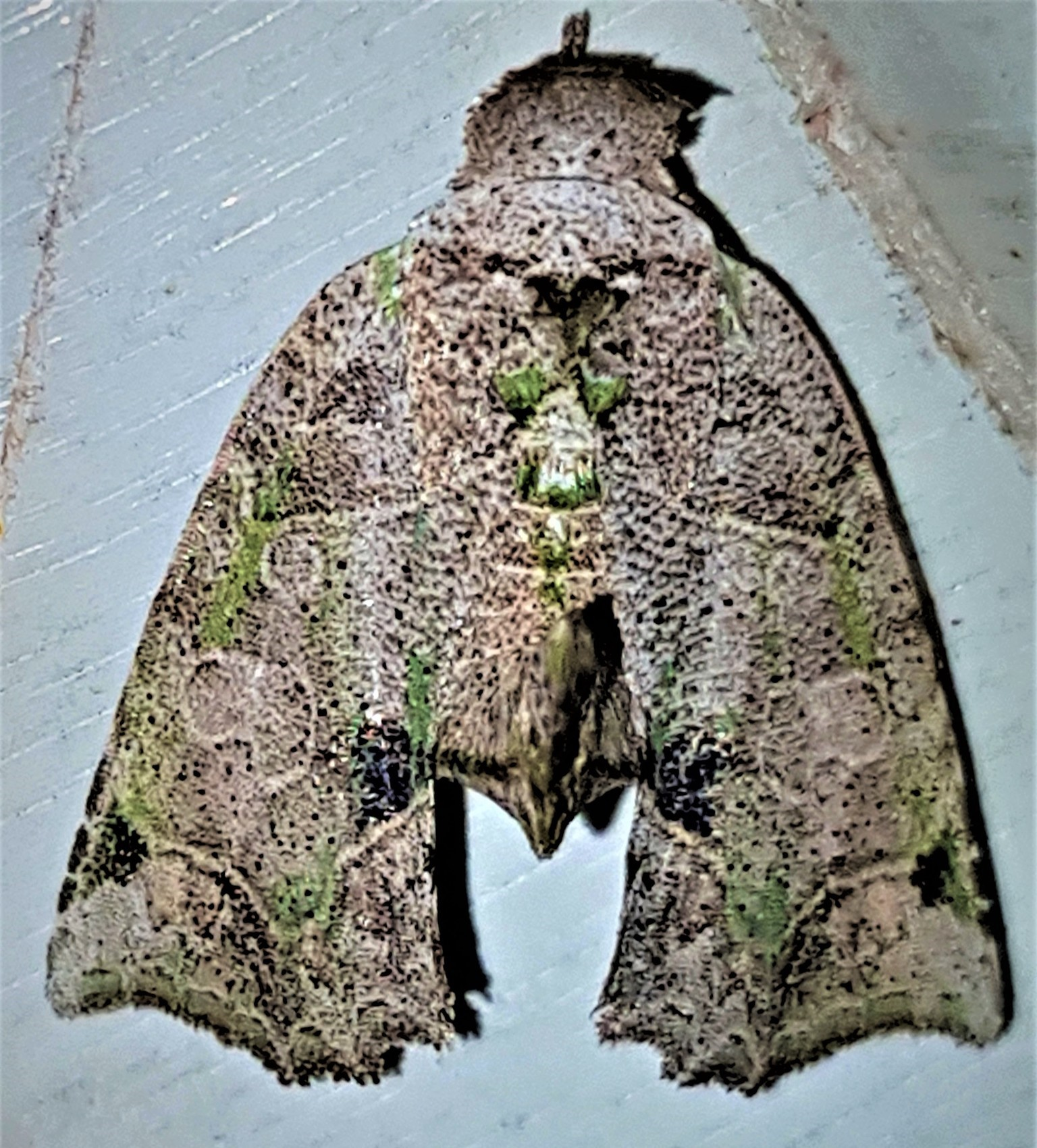
- Pelodesis viridifera

Scientific classification
- Kingdom: Animalia
- Phylum: Arthropoda
- Clade: Pancrustacea
- Class: Insecta
- Order: Lepidoptera
- Superfamily: Noctuoidea
- Family: Erebidae
- Subfamily: Calpinae
- Genus: Pelodesis; Hampson, 1926

= Pelodesis =

Genus of moths

Pelodesis is a genus of moths in the family Erebidae. The genus was erected by George Hampson in 1926.

== Species ==
- Pelodesis fulgens (Schaus, 1912) Costa Rica
- Pelodesis viridifera Hampson, 1926 Panama
