= Palthisomis =

Scientific classification
- Domain: Eukaryota
- Kingdom: Animalia
- Phylum: Arthropoda
- Class: Insecta
- Order: Lepidoptera
- Superfamily: Noctuoidea
- Family: Erebidae
- Subfamily: Herminiinae
- Genus: Palthisomis; Schaus, 1916
- Species: P. baresalis

Binomial name
- Palthisomis baresalis (Walker, 1859)

Synonyms
- Herminia baresalis Walker, 1859; Bleptina penicillalis Walker, 1862

Genus of moths

Palthisomis is a monotypic moth genus in the family Erebidae erected by William Schaus in 1916. Its only species, Palthisomis baresalis, was first described by Francis Walker in 1916. It is found in Rio de Janeiro, Brazil.
