= Pteroprista =

Scientific classification
- Domain: Eukaryota
- Kingdom: Animalia
- Phylum: Arthropoda
- Class: Insecta
- Order: Lepidoptera
- Superfamily: Noctuoidea
- Family: Erebidae
- Subfamily: Herminiinae
- Genus: Pteroprista; Warren, 1889
- Species: P. metallica

Binomial name
- Pteroprista metallica Warren, 1889

Genus of moths

Pteroprista is a monotypic moth genus of the family Erebidae. Its only species, Pteroprista metallica, is found in Brazil. Both the genus and the species were first described by Warren in 1889.
