= Prasinopyra =

Scientific classification
- Kingdom: Animalia
- Phylum: Arthropoda
- Class: Insecta
- Order: Lepidoptera
- Superfamily: Noctuoidea
- Family: Noctuidae
- Subfamily: Acontiinae
- Genus: Prasinopyra; Hampson, 1914

Synonyms
- Chlorhoda Hampson, 1910

Genus of moths

Prasinopyra is a genus of moths of the family Noctuidae. The genus was erected by George Hampson in 1914.

== Species ==
- Prasinopyra metacausta (Hampson, 1910) Cuba
- Prasinopyra metaleuca (Schaus, 1912) Costa Rica
- Prasinopyra semifascia (Dyar, 1920) Mexico
