= Peteroma =

Scientific classification
- Domain: Eukaryota
- Kingdom: Animalia
- Phylum: Arthropoda
- Class: Insecta
- Order: Lepidoptera
- Superfamily: Noctuoidea
- Family: Erebidae
- Subfamily: Calpinae
- Genus: Peteroma; Schaus, 1901

Synonyms
- Peteroma Schaus, 1906

Genus of moths

Peteroma is a genus of moths of the family Erebidae. The genus was described by William Schaus in 1901.

== Species ==
- Peteroma albilinea Schaus, 1901 Brazil (Rio de Janeiro)
- Peteroma alternata Dyar, 1912 Mexico
- Peteroma carilla Schaus, 1901 Venezuela
- Peteroma conita Schaus, 1901 Venezuela
- Peteroma dastona Schaus, 1901 Mexico
- Peteroma denticulata Dognin, 1912 Ecuador
- Peteroma discisigna (Walker, [1858]) Honduras
- Peteroma discopalina (Walker, 1858) Brazil (Rio de Janeiro)
- Peteroma isocampta Hampson, 1926 Venezuela
- Peteroma jarinta Schaus, 1901 Brazil (Rio de Janeiro)
- Peteroma jonesi (H. Druce, 1898) Guatemala
- Peteroma lacia (H. Druce, 1890) Panama
- Peteroma laonome (H. Druce, 1890) Guatemala
- Peteroma latizonata Hampson, 1926 Brazil (Rio Grande do Sul)
- Peteroma lignea Schaus, 1906 Venezuela
- Peteroma ligneola Dognin, 1912 Argentina (Tucuman)
- Peteroma zaleodes (Hampson, 1924) Brazil (Rio de Janeiro)
