= Perata =

Scientific classification
- Domain: Eukaryota
- Kingdom: Animalia
- Phylum: Arthropoda
- Class: Insecta
- Order: Lepidoptera
- Superfamily: Noctuoidea
- Family: Erebidae
- Subfamily: Herminiinae
- Genus: Perata; C. Swinhoe, 1919
- Species: P. curiosalis

Binomial name
- Perata curiosalis (C. Swinhoe, 1905)

Synonyms
- Adrapsa curiosalis C. Swinhoe, 1905

Genus of moths

Perata is a monotypic moth genus of the family Erebidae. Its only species, Perata curiosalis, is known from the Khasi Hills of Meghalaya, India. Both the genus and species were first described by Charles Swinhoe, the genus in 1919 and the species earlier in 1905.
