= Parargidia =

Scientific classification
- Kingdom: Animalia
- Phylum: Arthropoda
- Class: Insecta
- Order: Lepidoptera
- Superfamily: Noctuoidea
- Family: Erebidae
- Subfamily: Calpinae
- Genus: Parargidia; Hampson, 1926

Genus of moths

Parargidia is a genus of moths of the family Erebidae. The genus was erected by George Hampson in 1926.

== Species ==
- Parargidia octophora Felder, 1874
- Parargidia vacillans (Walker, 1858) Brazil (Amazonas)
