= Paragona =

Scientific classification
- Domain: Eukaryota
- Kingdom: Animalia
- Phylum: Arthropoda
- Class: Insecta
- Order: Lepidoptera
- Superfamily: Noctuoidea
- Family: Erebidae
- Subfamily: Calpinae
- Genus: Paragona; Staudinger, 1892

Genus of moths

Paragona is a genus of moths of the family Erebidae. The genus was described by Staudinger in 1892.

== Species ==
- Paragona auroviridis Viette, 1958 Madagascar
- Paragona cleorides Wileman, 1911 Japan
- Paragona cognata (Staudinger, 1892) south-eastern Siberia, Korea, Japan
- Paragona dubia Wileman, 1916 Taiwan
- Paragona inchoata (Wileman, 1911) Japan
- Paragona multisignata (Christoph, 1881) Korea, Amur
- Paragona nemorata Kononenko, Han & Matov, 2010
