= Panarenia =

Scientific classification
- Domain: Eukaryota
- Kingdom: Animalia
- Phylum: Arthropoda
- Class: Insecta
- Order: Lepidoptera
- Superfamily: Noctuoidea
- Family: Erebidae
- Subfamily: Herminiinae
- Genus: Panarenia; Schaus, 1916
- Species: P. subhirsuta

Binomial name
- Panarenia subhirsuta Schaus, 1916

Genus of moths

Panarenia is a monotypic moth genus of the family Erebidae. Its only species, Panarenia subhirsuta, is known from Peru. Both the genus and the species were first described by William Schaus in 1916.
