= Paranyctycia =

Scientific classification
- Domain: Eukaryota
- Kingdom: Animalia
- Phylum: Arthropoda
- Class: Insecta
- Order: Lepidoptera
- Superfamily: Noctuoidea
- Family: Noctuidae
- Subfamily: Xyleninae
- Genus: Paranyctycia; Hreblay & Ronkay, 1998

Genus of moths

Paranyctycia is a genus of moths of the family Noctuidae.

== Species ==
- Paranyctycia orbiculosa Hreblay & Ronkay, 1998
