= Procoeria =

Scientific classification
- Kingdom: Animalia
- Phylum: Arthropoda
- Class: Insecta
- Order: Lepidoptera
- Superfamily: Noctuoidea
- Family: Erebidae
- Subfamily: Calpinae
- Genus: Procoeria; Hampson, 1926
- Species: P. mesoneura

Binomial name
- Procoeria mesoneura Hampson, 1926

Genus of moths

Procoeria is a monotypic moth genus of the family Erebidae. Its only species, Procoeria mesoneura, is found in the Brazilian state of Rio de Janeiro. Both the genus and species were first described by George Hampson in 1926.
