= Parorena =

Scientific classification
- Kingdom: Animalia
- Phylum: Arthropoda
- Class: Insecta
- Order: Lepidoptera
- Superfamily: Noctuoidea
- Family: Erebidae
- Subfamily: Calpinae
- Genus: Parorena; Hampson, 1926
- Species: P. sminthochroa

Binomial name
- Parorena sminthochroa Hampson, 1926

Genus of moths

Parorena is a monotypic moth genus of the family Erebidae. Its only species, Parorena sminthochroa, is found in Mexico. Both the genus and species were first described by George Hampson in 1926.
