= Poliofoca =

Scientific classification
- Kingdom: Animalia
- Phylum: Arthropoda
- Class: Insecta
- Order: Lepidoptera
- Superfamily: Noctuoidea
- Family: Erebidae
- Subfamily: Calpinae
- Genus: Poliofoca; Hampson, 1926
- Species: P. gebenna

Binomial name
- Poliofoca gebenna (Swinhoe, 1903)

Synonyms
- Talapa gebenna Swinhoe, 1903

Genus of moths

Poliofoca is a genus of moths of the family Erebidae erected by George Hampson in 1926. Its only species, Poliofoca gebenna, was first described by Swinhoe in 1903. It is found in Thailand, Sundaland and the Philippines.
