= Phycoma =

Scientific classification
- Kingdom: Animalia
- Phylum: Arthropoda
- Clade: Pancrustacea
- Class: Insecta
- Order: Lepidoptera
- Superfamily: Noctuoidea
- Family: Erebidae
- Subfamily: Calpinae
- Genus: Phycoma; Hübner, [1823]
- Species: P. marcellina

Binomial name
- Phycoma marcellina (Stoll, [1780])

Synonyms
- Phalaena (Noctua) marcellina Stoll, [1780]; Phycoma retardens Walker, 1858

Genus of moths

Phycoma is a monotypic moth genus of the family Erebidae erected by Jacob Hübner in 1823. Its only species, Phycoma marcellina, was first described by Stoll in 1780. It is found in Suriname.
