= Paratolna =

Scientific classification
- Domain: Eukaryota
- Kingdom: Animalia
- Phylum: Arthropoda
- Class: Insecta
- Order: Lepidoptera
- Superfamily: Noctuoidea
- Family: Noctuidae (?)
- Subfamily: Catocalinae
- Genus: Paratolna; Aurivillius, 1925
- Species: P. brunneovittata

Binomial name
- Paratolna brunneovittata Aurivillius, 1925

Genus of moths

Paratolna is a monotypic moth genus of the family Noctuidae. Its only species, Paratolna brunneovittata, is found in Equatorial Guinea. Both the genus and the species were first described by Per Olof Christopher Aurivillius in 1925.
