= Proruaca =

Scientific classification
- Domain: Eukaryota
- Kingdom: Animalia
- Phylum: Arthropoda
- Class: Insecta
- Order: Lepidoptera
- Superfamily: Noctuoidea
- Family: Erebidae
- Subfamily: Calpinae
- Genus: Proruaca; Distant, 1901

Synonyms
- Proruaca Hampson, 1902

Genus of moths

Proruaca is a genus of moths of the family Erebidae. The genus was erected by William Lucas Distant in 1901.

== Species ==
- Proruaca harmonica Distant, 1901 South Africa, Malawi, Zimbabwe
- Proruaca recurrens Hampson, 1902 Kenya, Tanzania, Mozambique, Botswana, Zambia, Zimbabwe, South Africa, Namibia
