= Parelectra =

Scientific classification
- Domain: Eukaryota
- Kingdom: Animalia
- Phylum: Arthropoda
- Class: Insecta
- Order: Lepidoptera
- Superfamily: Noctuoidea
- Family: Noctuidae (?)
- Subfamily: Catocalinae
- Genus: Parelectra; Dognin, 1914

Synonyms
- Paralectra Hampson, 1926

Genus of moths

Parelectra is a genus of moths of the family Noctuidae. The genus was erected by Paul Dognin in 1914.

== Species ==
- Parelectra exaggerata Schaus, 1914
- Parelectra homochroa Dognin, 1914
