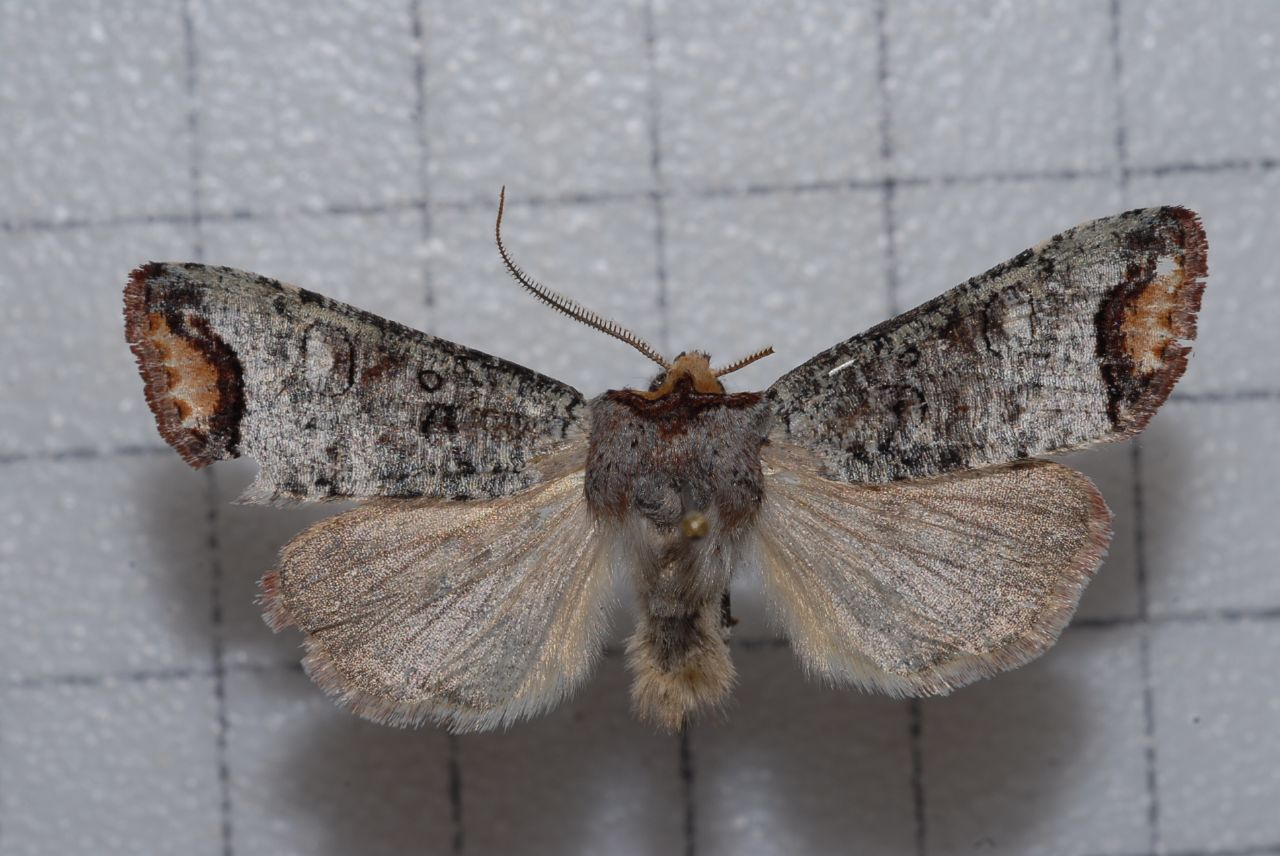
- Pseudopanolis flavimacula

Scientific classification
- Domain: Eukaryota
- Kingdom: Animalia
- Phylum: Arthropoda
- Class: Insecta
- Order: Lepidoptera
- Superfamily: Noctuoidea
- Family: Noctuidae
- Genus: Pseudopanolis; Inaba, 1927

= Pseudopanolis =

Genus of moths

Pseudopanolis is a genus of moths of the family Noctuidae.

== Species ==
- Pseudopanolis azusa Sugi, 1970
- Pseudopanolis flavimacula (Wileman, 1912)
- Pseudopanolis heterogyna (Bang-Haas, 1927)
- Pseudopanolis lala Owada, 1994
- Pseudopanolis puengeleri (Standfuss, 1912)
- Pseudopanolis takao Inaba, 1927
