= Paradiopa =

Scientific classification
- Kingdom: Animalia
- Phylum: Arthropoda
- Clade: Pancrustacea
- Class: Insecta
- Order: Lepidoptera
- Superfamily: Noctuoidea
- Family: Noctuidae
- Genus: Paradiopa; Prout, 1928

Genus of moths

Paradiopa is a genus of moths of the family Noctuidae.

== Species ==
- Paradiopa albidisca Holloway, 1976
- Paradiopa parthenia Prout, 1928
- Paradiopa postfusca (Hampson, 1893)
