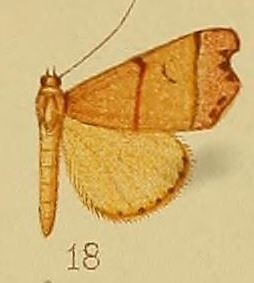
- Paralephana nigriciliata

Scientific classification
- Kingdom: Animalia
- Phylum: Arthropoda
- Class: Insecta
- Order: Lepidoptera
- Superfamily: Noctuoidea
- Family: Erebidae
- Subfamily: Calpinae
- Genus: Paralephana; Hampson, 1926

Type species
- Paralephana poliotis Hampson, 1926

= Paralephana =

Genus of moths

Paralephana is a genus of moths of the family Erebidae. It was described by George Hampson in 1926.

== Species ==
Some species of this genus are:

- Paralephana angulata (Viette, 1966)
- Paralephana argyresthia Hampson, 1926
- Paralephana bisignata Hampson, 1926
- Paralephana camptocera Hampson, 1926
- Paralephana catalai Viette, 1954
- Paralephana consocia Hampson, 1926
- Paralephana costisignata Hampson, 1926
- Paralephana curvilinea Hampson, 1926
- Paralephana decaryi Viette, 1954
- Paralephana descarpentiesi Viette, 1954
- Paralephana exangulata Gaede, 1939
- Paralephana ferox Viette, 1958
- Paralephana finipunctula (Holland, 1894)
- Paralephana flavilinea Hampson, 1926
- Paralephana incurvata Hampson, 1926
- Paralephana jugalis Viette, 1958
- Paralephana lakasy Viette, 1979
- Paralephana leucopis Hampson, 1926
- Paralephana linos Viette, 1972
- Paralephana lobata Hampson, 1926
- Paralephana mesoscia Hampson, 1926
- Paralephana metaphaea Hampson, 1926
- Paralephana monogona Hampson, 1926
- Paralephana nigriciliata (Hampson, 1910)
- Paralephana nigripalpis Hampson, 1926
- Paralephana obliqua Hampson, 1926
- Paralephana patagiata Hampson, 1926
- Paralephana poliotis Hampson, 1926
- Paralephana purpurascens Hampson, 1926
- Paralephana pyxinodes Viette, 1958
- Paralephana rectilinea Hampson, 1926
- Paralephana salmonea Viette, 1966
- Paralephana sarcochroa Hampson, 1926
- Paralephana subpurpurascens Viette, 1954
- Paralephana syntripta Viette, 1958
- Paralephana talacai Viette, 1982
- Paralephana umbrata Griveaud & Viette, 1962
- Paralephana uniplagiata Viette, 1966
- Paralephana westi D. S. Fletcher, 1961
