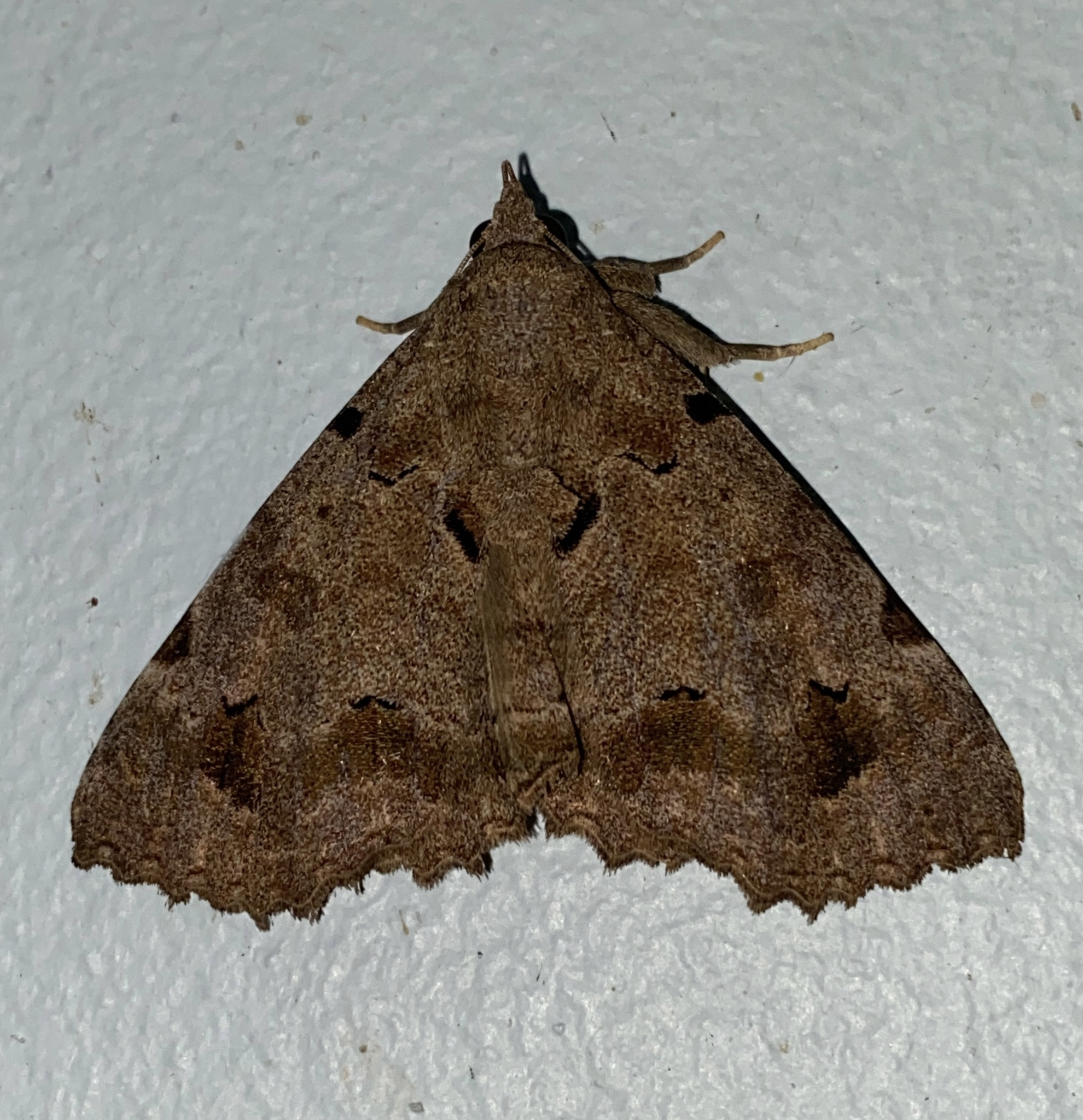
- Pseudbarydia bicristata

Scientific classification
- Kingdom: Animalia
- Phylum: Arthropoda
- Clade: Pancrustacea
- Class: Insecta
- Order: Lepidoptera
- Superfamily: Noctuoidea
- Family: Erebidae
- Subfamily: Calpinae
- Genus: Pseudbarydia; Hampson, 1924

= Pseudbarydia =

Genus of moths

Pseudbarydia is a genus of moths in the family Erebidae. The genus was erected by George Hampson in 1924.

== Species ==
- Pseudbarydia bicristata (Kaye, 1901) Trinidad
- Pseudbarydia cladonia Felder, 1874
- Pseudbarydia crespula (Möschler, 1880) Panama, Suriname, Peru
- Pseudbarydia elipha Schaus, 1940
- Pseudbarydia japeta (Stoll, [1781]) Suriname, Venezuela
- Pseudbarydia pulverosa Schaus, 1911
- Pseudbarydia schausi H. Druce, 1890
- Pseudbarydia selene Möschler
