= Pectinifera =

Scientific classification
- Domain: Eukaryota
- Kingdom: Animalia
- Phylum: Arthropoda
- Class: Insecta
- Order: Lepidoptera
- Superfamily: Noctuoidea
- Family: Erebidae
- Subfamily: Calpinae
- Genus: Pectinifera; Berio, 1964
- Species: P. sypnaesimilis

Binomial name
- Pectinifera sypnaesimilis Berio, 1964

Genus of moths

Pectinifera is a monotypic moth genus of the family Erebidae. Its only species, Pectinifera sypnaesimilis, is found in the Democratic Republic of the Congo. Both the genus and species were first described by Emilio Berio in 1964.
