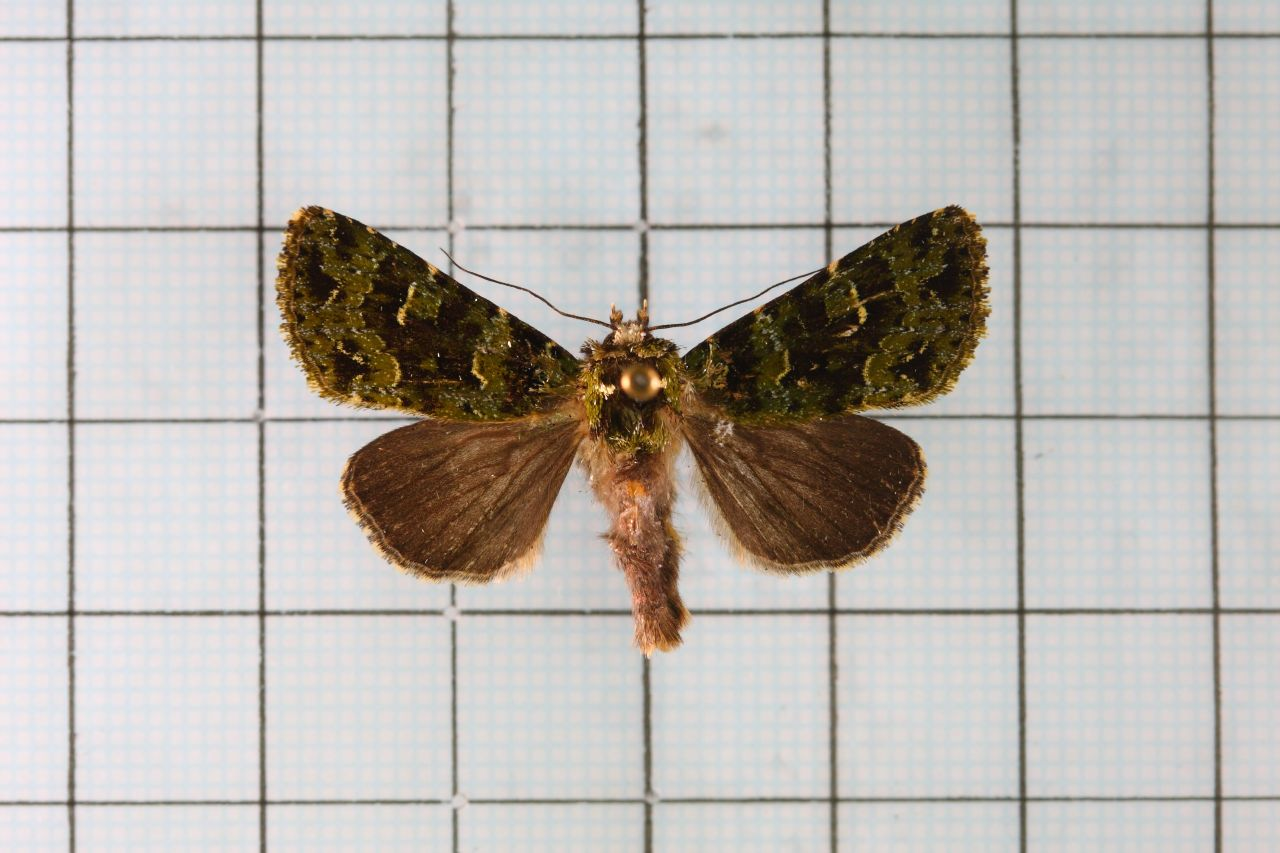

Scientific classification
- Domain: Eukaryota
- Kingdom: Animalia
- Phylum: Arthropoda
- Class: Insecta
- Order: Lepidoptera
- Superfamily: Noctuoidea
- Family: Noctuidae
- Genus: Plexiphleps; Warren in Seitz, 1913
- Species: P. stellifera

Binomial name
- Plexiphleps stellifera (Moore, 1882)

Synonyms
- Dianthoecia stellifera Moore, 1882

= Plexiphleps =

Genus of moths

Plexiphleps is a genus of moths of the family Noctuidae. It consists of only one species Plexiphleps stellifera, which is found in Asia, from India to Taiwan.
