= Pseudocoarica =

Scientific classification
- Kingdom: Animalia
- Phylum: Arthropoda
- Clade: Pancrustacea
- Class: Insecta
- Order: Lepidoptera
- Superfamily: Noctuoidea
- Family: Erebidae
- Subfamily: Calpinae
- Genus: Pseudocoarica; Holloway, 1979
- Species: P. caledonica

Binomial name
- Pseudocoarica caledonica Holloway, 1979

Genus of moths

Pseudocoarica is a monotypic moth genus of the family Erebidae. Its only species, Pseudocoarica caledonica, is found in New Caledonia. Both the genus and species were first described by Jeremy Daniel Holloway in 1979.
