= Plasmaticus =

Scientific classification
- Domain: Eukaryota
- Kingdom: Animalia
- Phylum: Arthropoda
- Class: Insecta
- Order: Lepidoptera
- Superfamily: Noctuoidea
- Family: Noctuidae (?)
- Subfamily: Catocalinae
- Genus: Plasmaticus; Bethune-Baker, 1906
- Species: P. angulata

Binomial name
- Plasmaticus angulata Bethune-Baker, 1906

Genus of moths

Plasmaticus is a monotypic moth genus of the family Noctuidae. Its only species, Plasmaticus angulata, is known from New Guinea. Both the genus and species were first described by George Thomas Bethune-Baker in 1906.
