= Peltothis =

Scientific classification
- Domain: Eukaryota
- Kingdom: Animalia
- Phylum: Arthropoda
- Class: Insecta
- Order: Lepidoptera
- Superfamily: Noctuoidea
- Family: Noctuidae
- Subfamily: Heliothinae
- Genus: Peltothis; Beck, 1996

Genus of moths

Peltothis is a genus of moths of the family Noctuidae. It was proposed for Heliothis peltigera, but is not widely accepted.
