= Paragarista =

Scientific classification
- Domain: Eukaryota
- Kingdom: Animalia
- Phylum: Arthropoda
- Class: Insecta
- Order: Lepidoptera
- Superfamily: Noctuoidea
- Family: Noctuidae (?)
- Subfamily: Catocalinae
- Genus: Paragarista; Bethune-Baker, 1906
- Species: P. albostriata

Binomial name
- Paragarista albostriata Bethune-Baker, 1906

Genus of moths

Paragarista is a genus of moths of the family Noctuidae. Its only species, Paragarista albostriata, is known from New Guinea. Both the genus and the species were described by George Thomas Bethune-Baker in 1906.
