= Prototrachea =

Scientific classification
- Kingdom: Animalia
- Phylum: Arthropoda
- Class: Insecta
- Order: Lepidoptera
- Superfamily: Noctuoidea
- Family: Noctuidae
- Genus: Prototrachea; Viette, 1965

Genus of moths

Prototrachea is a genus of moths of the family Noctuidae.

== Species ==
- Prototrachea leucopicta (Kenrick, 1917)
