= Phaeozona =

Scientific classification
- Kingdom: Animalia
- Phylum: Arthropoda
- Class: Insecta
- Order: Lepidoptera
- Superfamily: Noctuoidea
- Family: Noctuidae
- Subfamily: Acontiinae
- Genus: Phaeozona; Hampson, 1910
- Species: P. purpurascens

Binomial name
- Phaeozona purpurascens (Bethune-Baker, 1906)

Synonyms
- Acantholipes purpurascens Bethune-Baker, 1906

Genus of moths

Phaeozona is a monotypic moth genus of the family Noctuidae erected by George Hampson in 1910. Its only species, Phaeozona purpurascens, was first described by George Thomas Bethune-Baker in 1906. It is found in New Guinea.
