= Palyna =

Scientific classification
- Kingdom: Animalia
- Phylum: Arthropoda
- Class: Insecta
- Order: Lepidoptera
- Superfamily: Noctuoidea
- Family: Erebidae
- Subfamily: Calpinae
- Genus: Palyna; Guenée in Boisduval & Guenée, 1852

Genus of moths

Palyna is a genus of moths of the family Erebidae. The genus was erected by Achille Guenée in 1852.

== Species ==
- Palyna metagona Walker, 1858 Amazon region
- Palyna praegrandis Guenée, 1852 French Guiana
- Palyna semilunaris Guenée, 1852 French Guiana
