= Pseudoligia =

Scientific classification
- Kingdom: Animalia
- Phylum: Arthropoda
- Class: Insecta
- Order: Lepidoptera
- Superfamily: Noctuoidea
- Family: Noctuidae
- Genus: Pseudoligia; Staudinger, 1901

Genus of moths

Pseudoligia is a genus of moths of the family Noctuidae.

== Species ==
- Pseudoligia similiaria (Ménétriés, 1849)
- Pseudoligia lucifer L.Ronkay & Gyulai, 2008
