= Paracroma =

Scientific classification
- Missing taxonomy template (fix): Paracroma

Genus of moths

Paracroma is a genus of moths of the family Erebidae. The genus was erected by Paul Dognin in 1914.

== Species ==
- Paracroma mutilum Dognin, 1914
- Paracroma zamora Dognin, 1914
