= Pyrgion =

Scientific classification
- Domain: Eukaryota
- Kingdom: Animalia
- Phylum: Arthropoda
- Class: Insecta
- Order: Lepidoptera
- Superfamily: Noctuoidea
- Family: Erebidae
- Subfamily: Herminiinae
- Genus: Pyrgion; H. Druce in Godman & Salvin, 1891
- Species: P. repanda

Binomial name
- Pyrgion repanda (Schaus, 1912)

Genus of moths

Pyrgion is a monotypic moth genus of the family Erebidae erected by Herbert Druce in 1891. Its only species, Pyrgion repanda, was first described by Schaus in 1912. It is found in Costa Rica.
