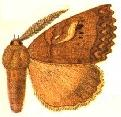
- Drawing of Prionoptera serraoides

Scientific classification
- Domain: Eukaryota
- Kingdom: Animalia
- Phylum: Arthropoda
- Class: Insecta
- Order: Lepidoptera
- Superfamily: Noctuoidea
- Family: Noctuidae (?)
- Subfamily: Catocalinae
- Genus: Prionoptera; Herrich-Schäffer, 1858

= Prionoptera =

Genus of moths

Prionoptera is a genus of moths of the family Noctuidae.

== Species ==
- Prionoptera aexonia (Druce, 1890)
- Prionoptera serra (Herrich-Schäffer, 1856)
- Prionoptera serraoides Dognin, 1892
- Prionoptera socorrensis Dognin, 1912
