= Physulodes =

Scientific classification
- Kingdom: Animalia
- Phylum: Arthropoda
- Class: Insecta
- Order: Lepidoptera
- Superfamily: Noctuoidea
- Family: Erebidae
- Subfamily: Herminiinae
- Genus: Physulodes; Warren, 1889
- Species: P. eupithecialis

Binomial name
- Physulodes eupithecialis (Guenée, 1854)

Genus of moths

Physulodes is a monotypic moth genus of the family Erebidae described by Warren in 1889. Its only species, Physulodes eupithecialis, was first described by Achille Guenée in 1854.
