= Platyprosopa =

Scientific classification
- Domain: Eukaryota
- Kingdom: Animalia
- Phylum: Arthropoda
- Class: Insecta
- Order: Lepidoptera
- Superfamily: Noctuoidea
- Family: Noctuidae
- Genus: Platyprosopa; Warren, 1913

Genus of moths

Platyprosopa is a genus of moths of the family Noctuidae.

== Species ==
- Platyprosopa nigrostrigata (Bethune-Baker, 1906)
