= Phrictia =

Scientific classification
- Kingdom: Animalia
- Phylum: Arthropoda
- Clade: Pancrustacea
- Class: Insecta
- Order: Lepidoptera
- Superfamily: Noctuoidea
- Family: Erebidae
- Subfamily: Calpinae
- Genus: Phrictia; Hübner, [1821]
- Species: P. lingea

Binomial name
- Phrictia lingea (Stoll, [1782])

Synonyms
- Phalaena (Noctua) lingea Stoll, [1782]

Genus of moths

Phrictia is a monotypic moth genus of the family Erebidae erected by Jacob Hübner in 1821. Its only species, Phrictia lingea, was first described by Caspar Stoll in 1782. It is found in Guyana.

The Global Lepidoptera Names Index gives this name as a synonym of Lesmone Hübner, 1818.
