= Parasada =

Scientific classification
- Kingdom: Animalia
- Phylum: Arthropoda
- Class: Insecta
- Order: Lepidoptera
- Superfamily: Noctuoidea
- Family: Noctuidae
- Subfamily: Acontiinae
- Genus: Parasada; Hampson, 1910
- Species: P. carnosa

Binomial name
- Parasada carnosa Hampson, 1893

Synonyms
- Lycauges carnosa Hampson, 1893

Genus of moths

Parasada is a monotypic moth genus of the family Noctuidae. Its only species, Parasada carnosa, is found in Sri Lanka and Japan. Both the genus and species were first described by George Hampson, the genus in 1910, and the species in 1893.
