= Pyripnoa =

Scientific classification
- Domain: Eukaryota
- Kingdom: Animalia
- Phylum: Arthropoda
- Class: Insecta
- Order: Lepidoptera
- Superfamily: Noctuoidea
- Family: Noctuidae
- Subfamily: Acontiinae
- Genus: Pyripnoa; Turner, 1920

Genus of moths

Pyripnoa is a genus of moths of the family Noctuidae. The genus was described by Turner in 1920.

== Species ==
- Pyripnoa auricularia Lucas, 1894
- Pyripnoa pyraspis Meyrick, 1891
- Pyripnoa sciaptera Lower, 1903
