= Pseudoglaea =

Scientific classification
- Kingdom: Animalia
- Phylum: Arthropoda
- Class: Insecta
- Order: Lepidoptera
- Superfamily: Noctuoidea
- Family: Noctuidae
- Subfamily: Cuculliinae
- Genus: Pseudoglaea; Grote, 1876

Genus of moths

Pseudoglaea was a genus of moths of the family Noctuidae, it is now considered a synonym of Mesogona

== Former species ==
- Pseudoglaea olivata is now known as Mesogona olivata (Harvey, 1874)
