= Poenomia =

Scientific classification
- Domain: Eukaryota
- Kingdom: Animalia
- Phylum: Arthropoda
- Class: Insecta
- Order: Lepidoptera
- Superfamily: Noctuoidea
- Family: Erebidae
- Subfamily: Herminiinae
- Genus: Poenomia; Schaus, 1913

Genus of moths

Poenomia is a genus of moths of the family Erebidae. The genus was described by William Schaus in 1913.

== Species ==
- Poenomia berthalis (Schaus, 1906) Brazil
- Poenomia frigidalis Dognin, 1914 Peru
- Poenomia hiempsal Schaus, 1913 Costa Rica
- Poenomia maculata Schaus, 1913 Costa Rica
- Poenomia turpis Schaus, 1913 Costa Rica
