= Paromphale =

Scientific classification
- Kingdom: Animalia
- Phylum: Arthropoda
- Class: Insecta
- Order: Lepidoptera
- Superfamily: Noctuoidea
- Family: Noctuidae
- Genus: Paromphale; Hampson, 1908

Genus of moths

Paromphale is a genus of moths of the family Noctuidae.

== Species ==
- Paromphale caeca (Swinhoe, 1902)
