= Pseudotolna =

Scientific classification
- Kingdom: Animalia
- Phylum: Arthropoda
- Class: Insecta
- Order: Lepidoptera
- Superfamily: Noctuoidea
- Family: Erebidae
- Subfamily: Calpinae
- Genus: Pseudotolna; Hampson, 1926

Type species
- Methorasa eximia Holland, 1894

Genus of moths

Pseudotolna is a genus of moths of the family Erebidae. The genus was erected by George Hampson in 1926.

== Species ==
- Pseudotolna eximia (Holland, 1894)
- Pseudotolna leucomelas Gaede, 1939
- Pseudotolna lineosa Laporte, 1973
- Pseudotolna perineti Viette, 1965
