= Paranoratha =

Scientific classification
- Domain: Eukaryota
- Kingdom: Animalia
- Phylum: Arthropoda
- Class: Insecta
- Order: Lepidoptera
- Superfamily: Noctuoidea
- Family: Erebidae
- Subfamily: Hypeninae
- Genus: Paranoratha; Bethune-Baker, 1908
- Species: P. fusca

Binomial name
- Paranoratha fusca Bethune-Baker, 1908

Genus of moths

Paranoratha is a monotypic moth genus of the family Erebidae. Its only species, Paranoratha fusca, is found in New Guinea. Both the genus and the species were first described by George Thomas Bethune-Baker in 1908.
