= Prometopus =

Scientific classification
- Kingdom: Animalia
- Phylum: Arthropoda
- Class: Insecta
- Order: Lepidoptera
- Superfamily: Noctuoidea
- Family: Noctuidae
- Genus: Prometopus; Guenée, 1852

Genus of moths

Prometopus is a genus of moths of the family Noctuidae.

== Species ==
- Prometopus albistigma (Swinhoe, 1904)
- Prometopus asahina (Kobes, 1985)
- Prometopus inassueta Guenée, 1852
- Prometopus flavicollis Leech
