= Pachyplastis =

Scientific classification
- Domain: Eukaryota
- Kingdom: Animalia
- Phylum: Arthropoda
- Class: Insecta
- Order: Lepidoptera
- Superfamily: Noctuoidea
- Family: Erebidae
- Subfamily: Calpinae
- Genus: Pachyplastis; Felder in Felder & Rogenhofer, 1874
- Species: P. apicalis

Binomial name
- Pachyplastis apicalis Felder, 1874

Genus and species of moth

Pachyplastis is a monotypic moth genus of the family Erebidae. Its only species, Pachyplastis apicalis, is found in the Brazilian state of Amazonas. Both the genus and species were first described by Felder in 1874.
