= Paracarsia =

Scientific classification
- Kingdom: Animalia
- Phylum: Arthropoda
- Class: Insecta
- Order: Lepidoptera
- Superfamily: Noctuoidea
- Family: Erebidae
- Subfamily: Calpinae
- Genus: Paracarsia; Hampson, 1926
- Species: P. antitermina

Binomial name
- Paracarsia antitermina Hampson, 1926

Genus of moths

Paracarsia is a monotypic moth genus of the family Erebidae. Its only species, Paracarsia antitermina, is found in the Brazilian state of Rio de Janeiro. Both the genus and species were first described by George Hampson in 1926.
