= Pseudoxestia =

Scientific classification
- Domain: Eukaryota
- Kingdom: Animalia
- Phylum: Arthropoda
- Class: Insecta
- Order: Lepidoptera
- Superfamily: Noctuoidea
- Family: Noctuidae
- Subfamily: Noctuinae
- Genus: Pseudoxestia; Boursin, 1953

Type species
- Hiptelia apfelbecki Rebel, 1901

Genus of moths

Pseudoxestia is a genus of moths of the family Noctuidae. It is now considered as a junior synonym of the genus Rusina.
