= Pseudozalissa =

Scientific classification
- Domain: Eukaryota
- Kingdom: Animalia
- Phylum: Arthropoda
- Class: Insecta
- Order: Lepidoptera
- Superfamily: Noctuoidea
- Family: Erebidae
- Subfamily: Calpinae
- Genus: Pseudozalissa; Bethune-Baker, 1906
- Species: P. bella

Binomial name
- Pseudozalissa bella Bethune-Baker, 1906

Genus of moths

Pseudozalissa is a monotypic moth genus of the family Erebidae. Its only species, Pseudozalissa bella, is found in New Guinea. Both the genus and species were first described by George Thomas Bethune-Baker in 1906.
