= Pseudalelimma =

Scientific classification
- Kingdom: Animalia
- Phylum: Arthropoda
- Class: Insecta
- Order: Lepidoptera
- Superfamily: Noctuoidea
- Family: Erebidae
- Subfamily: Herminiinae
- Genus: Pseudalelimma; Inoue, 1965
- Species: P. miwai

Binomial name
- Pseudalelimma miwai Inoue, 1965

Genus of moths

Pseudalelimma is a monotypic moth genus of the family Erebidae. Its only species, Pseudalelimma miwai, is known from Japan. Both the genus and the species were first described by Hiroshi Inoue in 1965.
