= Pogopus =

Scientific classification
- Kingdom: Animalia
- Phylum: Arthropoda
- Class: Insecta
- Order: Lepidoptera
- Superfamily: Noctuoidea
- Family: Erebidae
- Subfamily: Herminiinae
- Genus: Pogopus; Dyar, 1914
- Species: P. mictochroma

Binomial name
- Pogopus mictochroma Dyar, 1914

Genus of moths

Pogopus is a monotypic moth genus of the family Erebidae. Its only species, Pogopus mictochroma, is known from Panama. Both the genus and the species were first described by Harrison Gray Dyar Jr. in 1914.
