= Porosana =

Scientific classification
- Domain: Eukaryota
- Kingdom: Animalia
- Phylum: Arthropoda
- Class: Insecta
- Order: Lepidoptera
- Superfamily: Noctuoidea
- Family: Erebidae
- Subfamily: Calpinae
- Genus: Porosana; Schaus, 1913

Genus of moths

Porosana is a genus of moths of the family Erebidae. The genus was described by William Schaus in 1913.

== Species ==
- Porosana juanalis Schaus, 1916 French Guiana
- Porosana micralis Schaus, 1916 French Guiana
- Porosana uruca Schaus, 1913 Costa Rica
