= Purpurschinia =

Scientific classification
- Domain: Eukaryota
- Kingdom: Animalia
- Phylum: Arthropoda
- Class: Insecta
- Order: Lepidoptera
- Superfamily: Noctuoidea
- Family: Noctuidae
- Subfamily: Heliothinae
- Genus: Purpurschinia; Beck, 1996

Genus of moths

Purpurschinia is a genus of moths of the family Noctuidae. It was raised for Schinia purpurascens, but it is unclear if it is widely accepted.
