= Polygnamptia =

Scientific classification
- Domain: Eukaryota
- Kingdom: Animalia
- Phylum: Arthropoda
- Class: Insecta
- Order: Lepidoptera
- Superfamily: Noctuoidea
- Family: Erebidae
- Subfamily: Calpinae
- Genus: Polygnamptia; Schaus, 1914

Genus of moths

Polygnamptia is a genus of moths of the family Erebidae. The genus was described by William Schaus in 1914.

== Species ==
- Polygnamptia chloristicta Schaus, 1914 French Guiana
- Polygnamptia venipunctata Dognin, 1920
