= Pseudyrias =

Scientific classification
- Kingdom: Animalia
- Phylum: Arthropoda
- Class: Insecta
- Order: Lepidoptera
- Superfamily: Noctuoidea
- Family: Erebidae
- Subfamily: Calpinae
- Genus: Pseudyrias; Hampson, 1926

Genus of moths

Pseudyrias is a genus of moths of the family Erebidae. The genus was erected by George Hampson in 1926.

== Species ==
- Pseudyrias arcadelti Schaus, 1933 Venezuela
- Pseudyrias calligramma Hampson, 1926 Peru
- Pseudyrias corvita (Schaus, 1901) Mexico
- Pseudyrias dufayi Schaus, 1933 Jamaica
- Pseudyrias eugrapha (Dognin, 1914) Ecuador
- Pseudyrias farranti Schaus, 1933 Panama
- Pseudyrias gallusi Scahus, 1933 Guatemala
- Pseudyrias glycon (Schaus, 1914) French Guiana
- Pseudyrias gomberti Schaus, 1933 Mexico
- Pseudyrias grauni Schaus, 1933 Venezuela
- Pseudyrias lineata (H. Druce, 1890) Guatemala, Panama
- Pseudyrias melanchra Hampson, 1926 Peru
- Pseudyrias merbecki Schaus, 1933 French Guiana
- Pseudyrias olearos (Schaus, 1913) French Guiana
- Pseudyrias perusta (Kaye, 1901) Trinidad
- Pseudyrias purpureofusa Hampson, 1926 Brazil (Amazonas)
- Pseudyrias tyei Schaus, 1933 Guyana, Tridinda
- Pseudyrias villaerti Schaus, 1933 Guatemala
- Pseudyrias watsoni Schaus, 1940 Puerto Rico
