= Periphrage =

Scientific classification
- Domain: Eukaryota
- Kingdom: Animalia
- Phylum: Arthropoda
- Class: Insecta
- Order: Lepidoptera
- Superfamily: Noctuoidea
- Family: Erebidae
- Subfamily: Herminiinae
- Genus: Periphrage; Herrich-Schäffer, [1856]
- Species: P. barbatula

Binomial name
- Periphrage barbatula Herrich-Schäffer, [1856]

Genus of moths

Periphrage is a monotypic moth genus of the family Erebidae. Its only species, Periphrage barbatula, is known from Brazil. Both the genus and species were first described by Gottlieb August Wilhelm Herrich-Schäffer in 1856.
