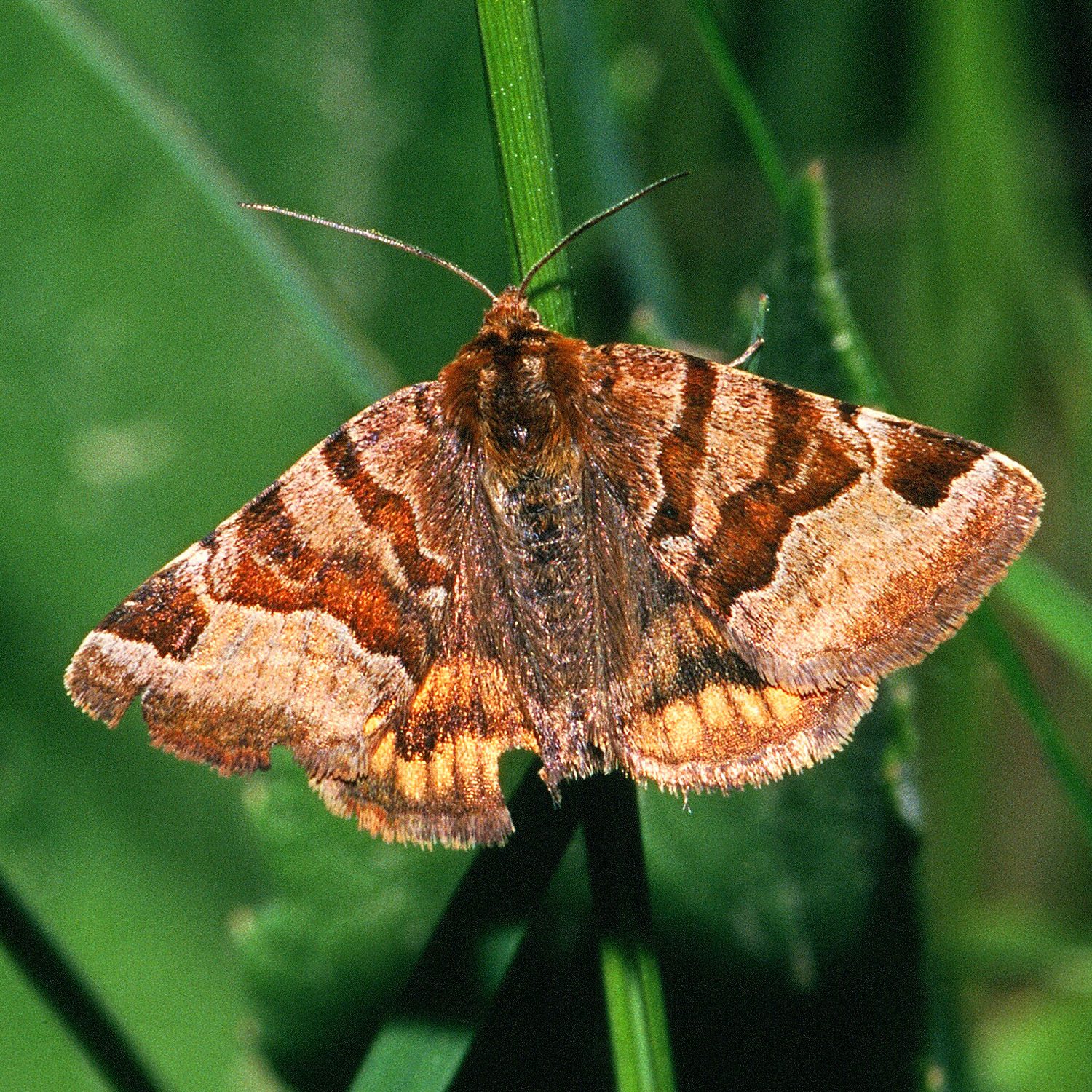
- Burnet companion, Euclidia glyphica

Scientific classification
- Kingdom: Animalia
- Phylum: Arthropoda
- Class: Insecta
- Order: Lepidoptera
- Superfamily: Noctuoidea
- Family: Erebidae
- Subfamily: Erebinae
- Tribe: Euclidiini; Guenée, 1852

Synonyms
- Ectypini Goater, Ronkay & Fibiger, 2003

= Euclidiini =

Tribe of moths

The Euclidiini are a tribe of moths in the family Erebidae. The tribe was erected by Achille Guenée in 1852.

== Genera ==
- Caenurgia
- Caenurgina
- Callistege
- Celiptera
- Doryodes
- Euclidia
- Leucomelas
- Mocis
- Pantydia
- Paramocis
- Ptichodis

== Possibly belong here ==
- Chamyna
- Ctenusa
- Discosema
- Donuctenusa
- Epidromia
- Euonychodes
- Homaea
- Melapia
- Nymbis
- Perasia
- Phurys
- Remigiodes
- Scodionyx
- Teratocera
