= Epidromia lienaris =

Scientific classification
- Kingdom: Animalia
- Phylum: Arthropoda
- Clade: Pancrustacea
- Class: Insecta
- Order: Lepidoptera
- Superfamily: Noctuoidea
- Family: Erebidae
- Genus: Epidromia
- Species: E. lienaris

Binomial name
- Epidromia lienaris (Hubner, 1823)

Synonyms
- Hemeroblemma lienaris Hubner, 1823; Ophisma profana Walker, 1858; Remigia saturatior Walker, 1858; Thermesia suffusa Walker, 1858; Thermesia tinctifera Walker, 1858; Thermesia glaucescens Walker, 1858; Thermesia lenis Walker, 1858; Ophisma antica Walker, 1865; Epidromia xanthogramma Wallegren, 1860

Species of moth

Epidromia lienaris is a moth of the family Erebidae first described by Jacob Hübner in 1823. It is found from southern Florida and Arizona southward through the Caribbean and Central America to Peru and Brazil and the Galápagos Islands.

The larvae feed on Psidium longipes, Psidium guajava, Eugenia axillaris, Metopium toxiferum and Rhus copallina.

== Taxonomy ==
Both Epidromia rotundata and Epidromia pannosa where formerly listed as synonyms, but are now considered distinct.
