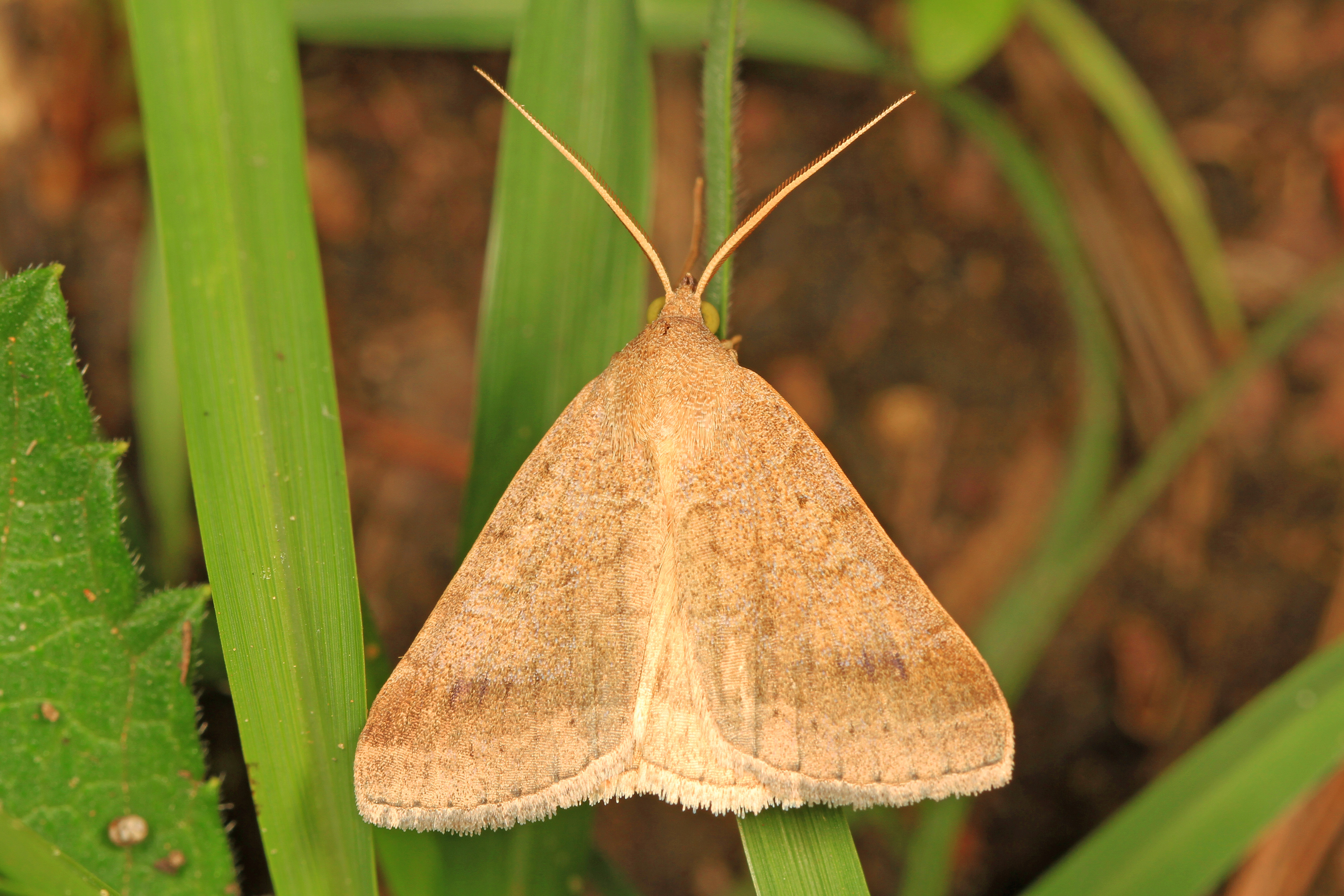
- Caenurgia chloropha

Scientific classification
- Kingdom: Animalia
- Phylum: Arthropoda
- Class: Insecta
- Order: Lepidoptera
- Superfamily: Noctuoidea
- Family: Erebidae
- Tribe: Euclidiini
- Genus: Caenurgia; Walker, 1858

Synonyms
- Litosea Grote, 1875

= Caenurgia =

Genus of moths

Caenurgia is a genus of moths in the family Erebidae.

== Species ==
- Caenurgia adusta (Walker, 1865)
- Caenurgia chloropha (Hübner, 1818) (syn: Caenurgia convalescens (Guenée, 1852), Caenurgia purgata (Walker, 1858), Caenurgia socors Walker, 1858)
- Caenurgia runica (Felder and Rogenhofer, 1874) (syn: Caenurgia magalhaensi (Staudinger, 1899), Caenurgia tehuelcha (Berg, 1875))
- Caenurgia togataria (Walker, 1862) (syn: Caenurgia adversa (Grote, 1875))

== Former species ==
- Caenurgia camptogramma (Dognin, 1919)
- Caenurgia escondida (Schaus, 1901)
- Caenurgia fortalitium (Tauscher, 1809)
- Caenurgia phasianoides (Guenée, 1852)
