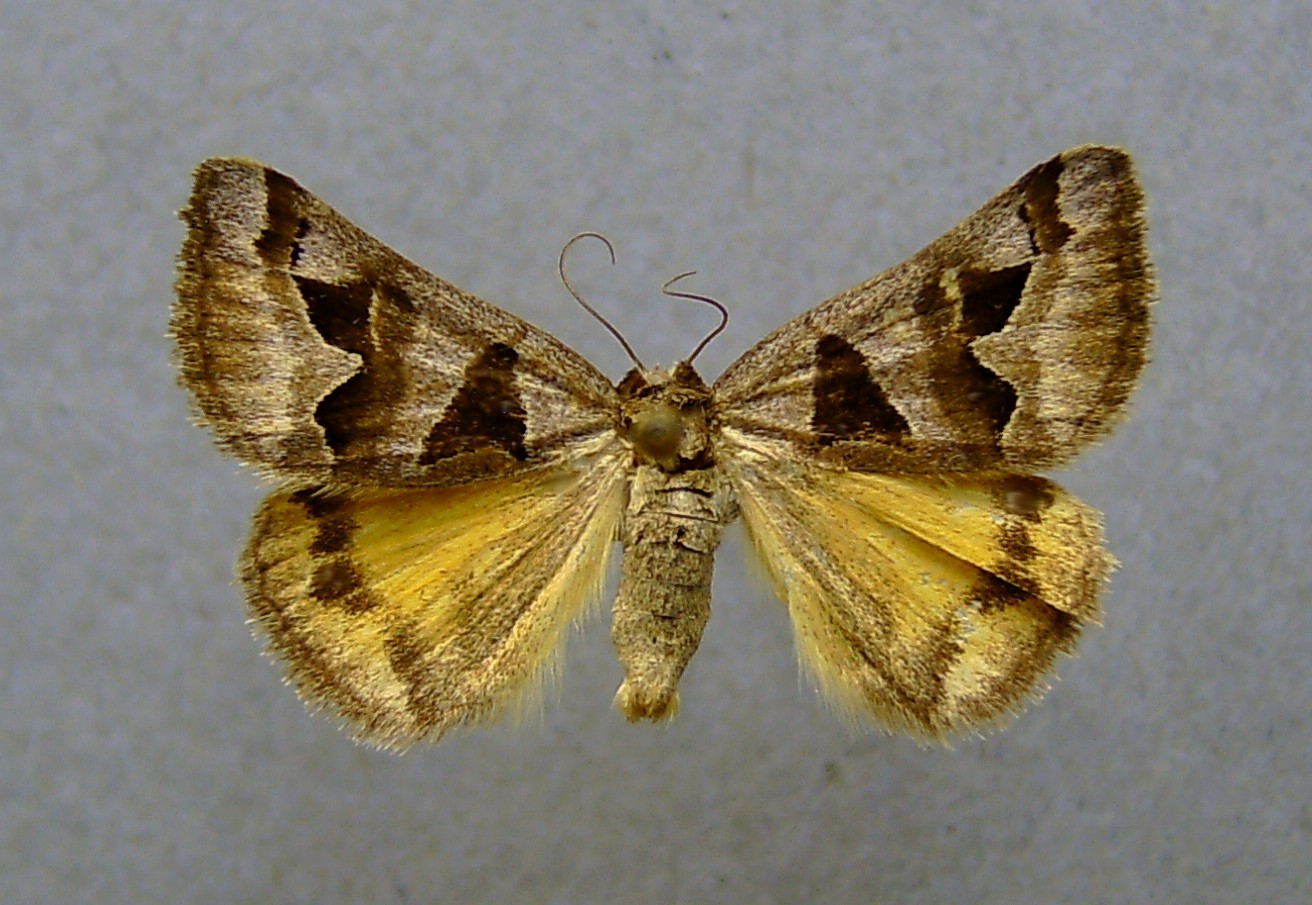

Scientific classification
- Kingdom: Animalia
- Phylum: Arthropoda
- Clade: Pancrustacea
- Class: Insecta
- Order: Lepidoptera
- Superfamily: Noctuoidea
- Family: Erebidae
- Genus: Euclidia
- Species: E. triquetra

Binomial name
- Euclidia triquetra (Denis & Schiffermüller, 1775)

Synonyms
- Noctua triquetra Denis & Schiffermüller, 1775; Noctua fortificata Fabricius, 1787; Phalaena fascialis Villers, 1789; Euclidia aurantiaca Staudinger, 1881; Gonospileia triquetra; Euclidia (Gonospileia) triquetra

= Euclidia triquetra =

Species of moth

Euclidia triquetra is a moth of the family Erebidae first described by Michael Denis and Ignaz Schiffermüller in 1775. It is found in south-eastern Europe, as well as Kazakhstan, Anatolia eastern Siberia up to the Pacific Ocean. Its habitat consists of warm, dry areas.

The wingspan is 24–30 mm. Adults are on wing from mid April to June and from the end of July to August. There are two generations per year. They are active during the day.

The larvae feed on various Fabaceae species, including Astragalus and Onobrychis species.
