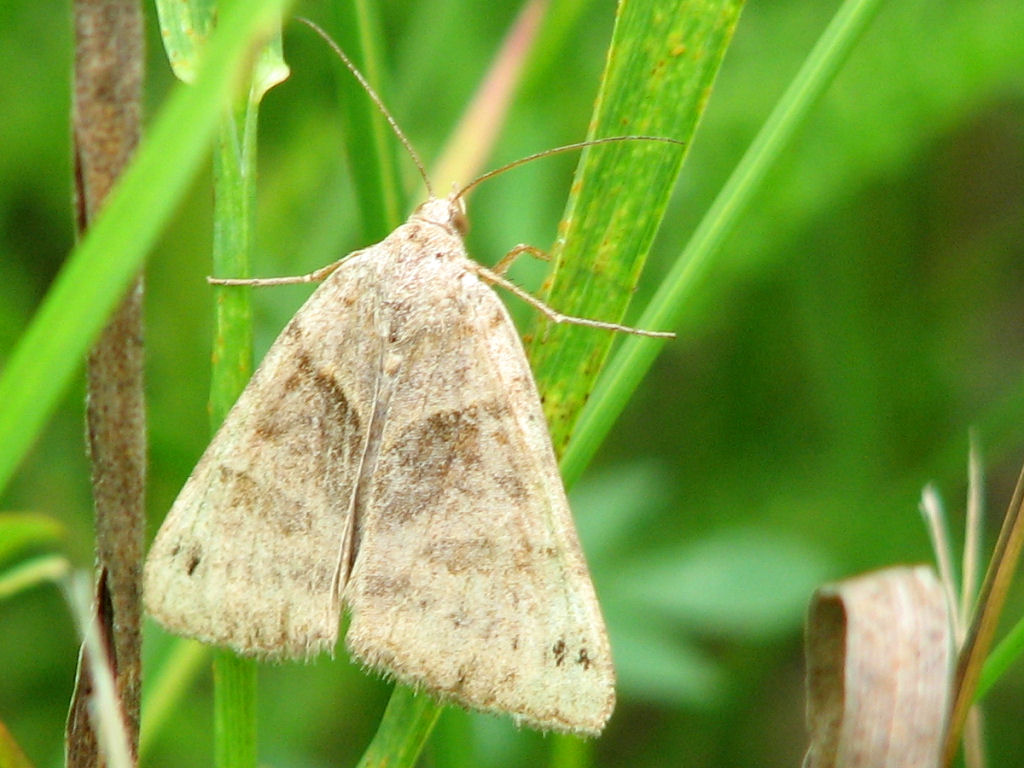
- Clover looper (C. crassiuscula)

Scientific classification
- Domain: Eukaryota
- Kingdom: Animalia
- Phylum: Arthropoda
- Class: Insecta
- Order: Lepidoptera
- Superfamily: Noctuoidea
- Family: Erebidae
- Tribe: Euclidiini
- Genus: Caenurgina; McDunnough, 1937

= Caenurgina =

Genus of moths

Caenurgina is a genus of moths in the family Erebidae.

== Species ==
- Caenurgina annexa (Edwards, 1890) – banded grass moth
- Caenurgina caerulea (Grote, 1873) – cerulean looper moth
- Caenurgina crassiuscula (Haworth, 1809) – clover looper, range grass moth
- Caenurgina erechtea (Cramer, 1780) – forage looper, common grass moth

== Former species ==
- Caenurgina distincta (Neumoegen, 1883)
