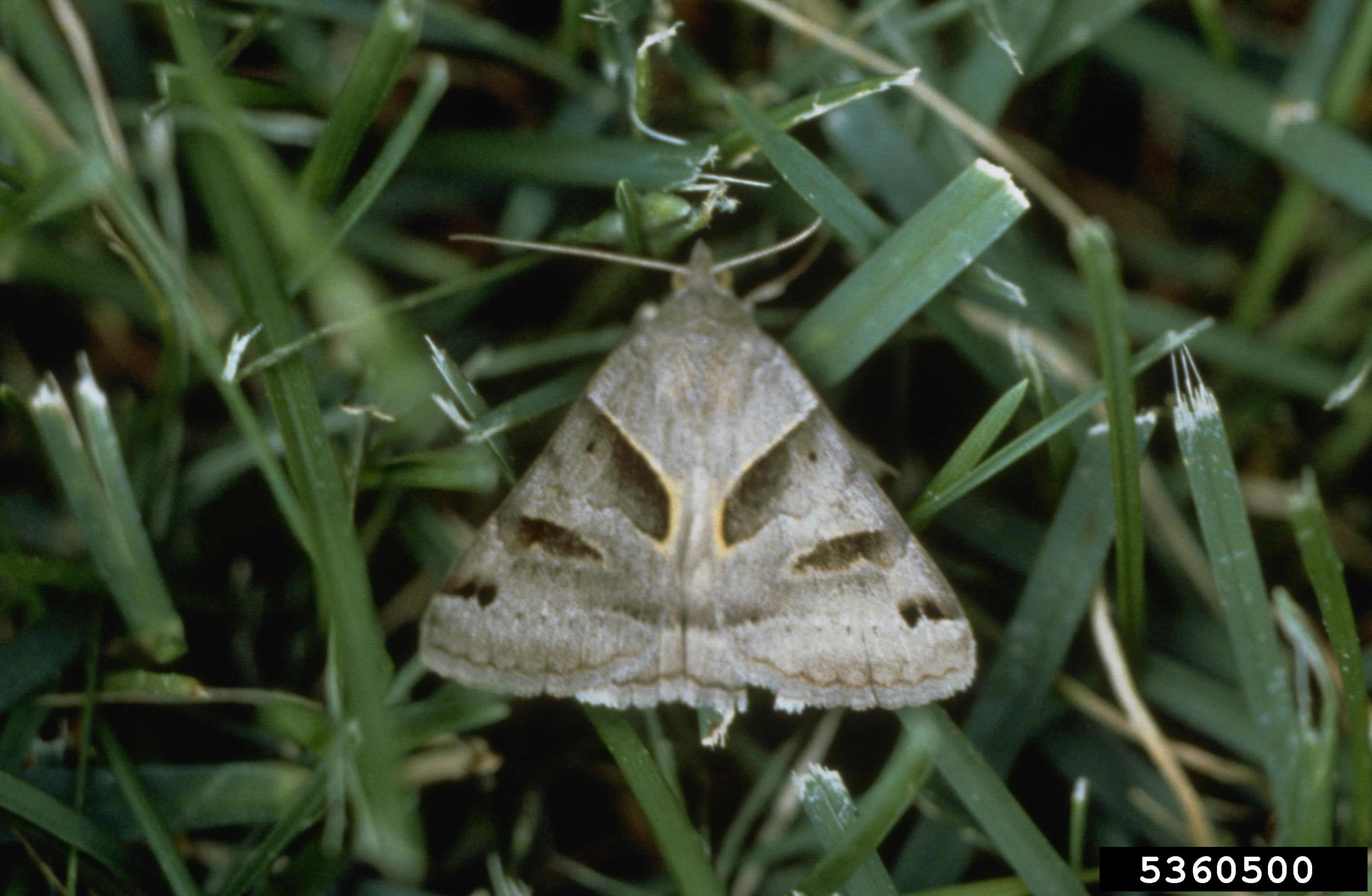

Scientific classification
- Kingdom: Animalia
- Phylum: Arthropoda
- Clade: Pancrustacea
- Class: Insecta
- Order: Lepidoptera
- Superfamily: Noctuoidea
- Family: Erebidae
- Genus: Caenurgina
- Species: C. crassiuscula

Binomial name
- Caenurgina crassiuscula (Haworth, 1809)

Synonyms
- Phytometra crassiuscula Haworth, 1809; Drasteria erichto Guenée, 1852; Remigia impressa Butler & H. Druce, 1872; Drasteria ochrea Grote, 1873; Microphysa sobria Walker, 1858; Drasteria distincta Neumoegen, 1883; Caenurgina distincta (Neumoegen, 1883)

= Caenurgina crassiuscula =

Species of moth

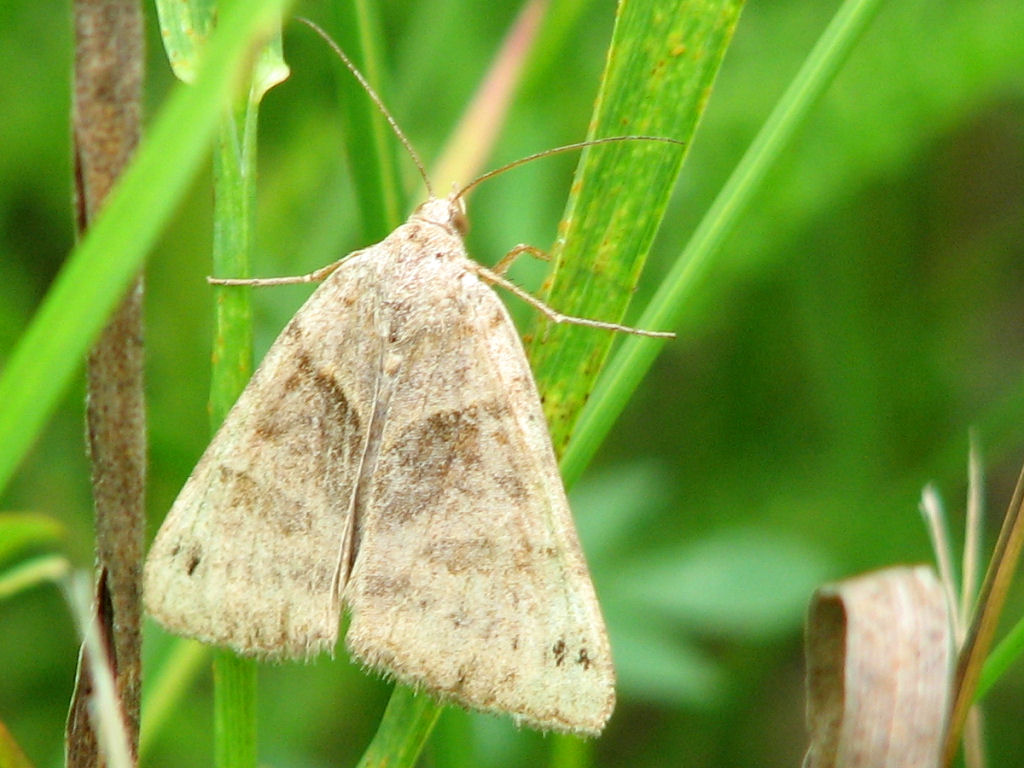
Ottawa, Ontario

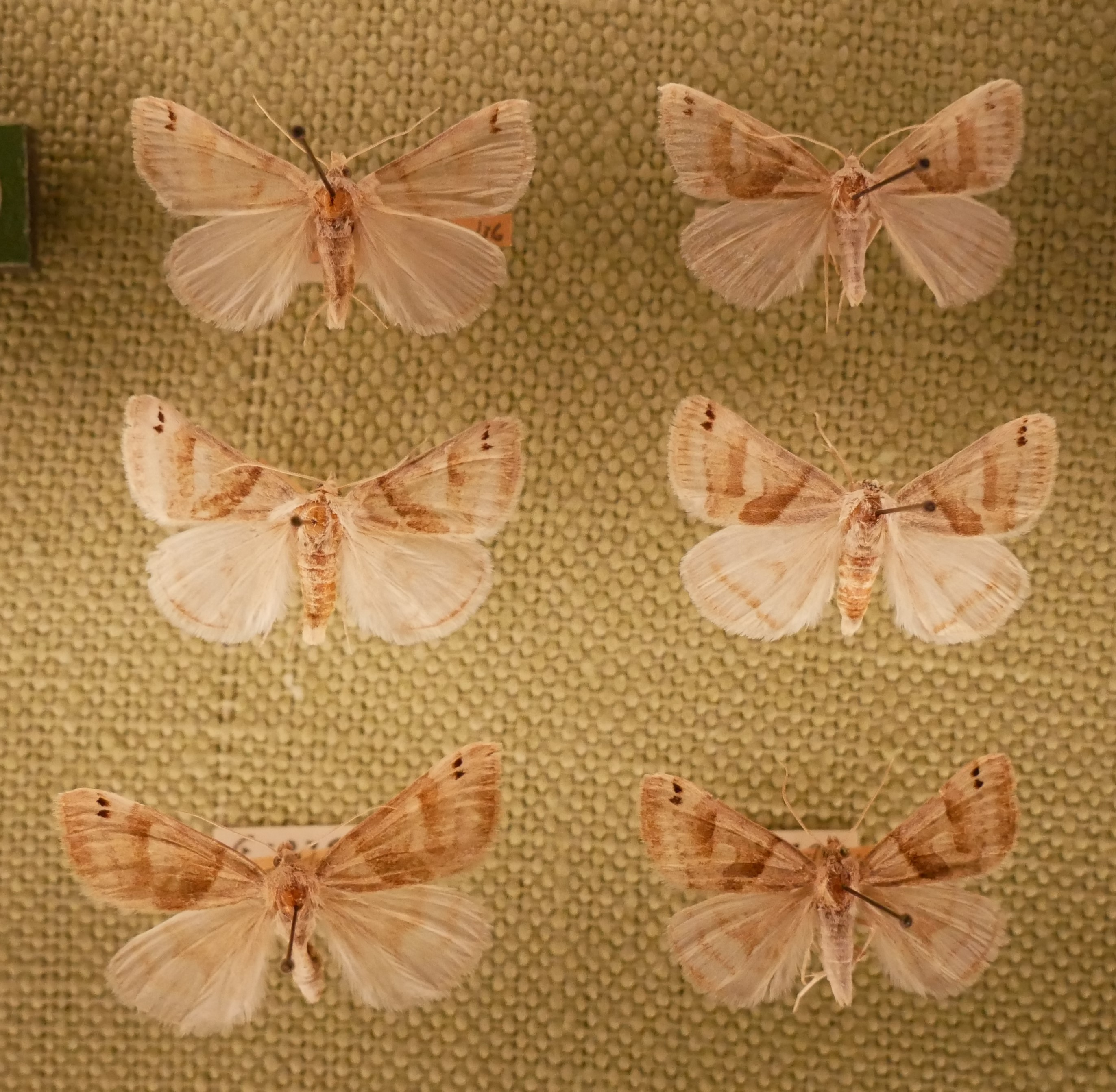
Museum Specimens

Caenurgina crassiuscula, the clover looper or range grass moth, is a moth of the family Erebidae. The species was first described by Adrian Hardy Haworth in 1809. It is found from coast to coast in the United States and adjacent parts of Canada, in the west to the Northwest Territories, Yukon, and Alaska.

Illustration

The wingspan is 30–40 mm. Adults are on wing from March to November depending on the location.

The larvae feed on various species of clover, grass, and lupine.
