= Paramocis =

Scientific classification
- Kingdom: Animalia
- Phylum: Arthropoda
- Class: Insecta
- Order: Lepidoptera
- Superfamily: Noctuoidea
- Family: Erebidae
- Tribe: Euclidiini
- Genus: Paramocis; Roepke, 1948
- Species: P. maculata

Binomial name
- Paramocis maculata Roepke, 1948

Genus of moths

Paramocis is a genus of moths of the family Erebidae. It contains only one species, Paramocis maculata, which is found in Sumatra, Indonesia.
