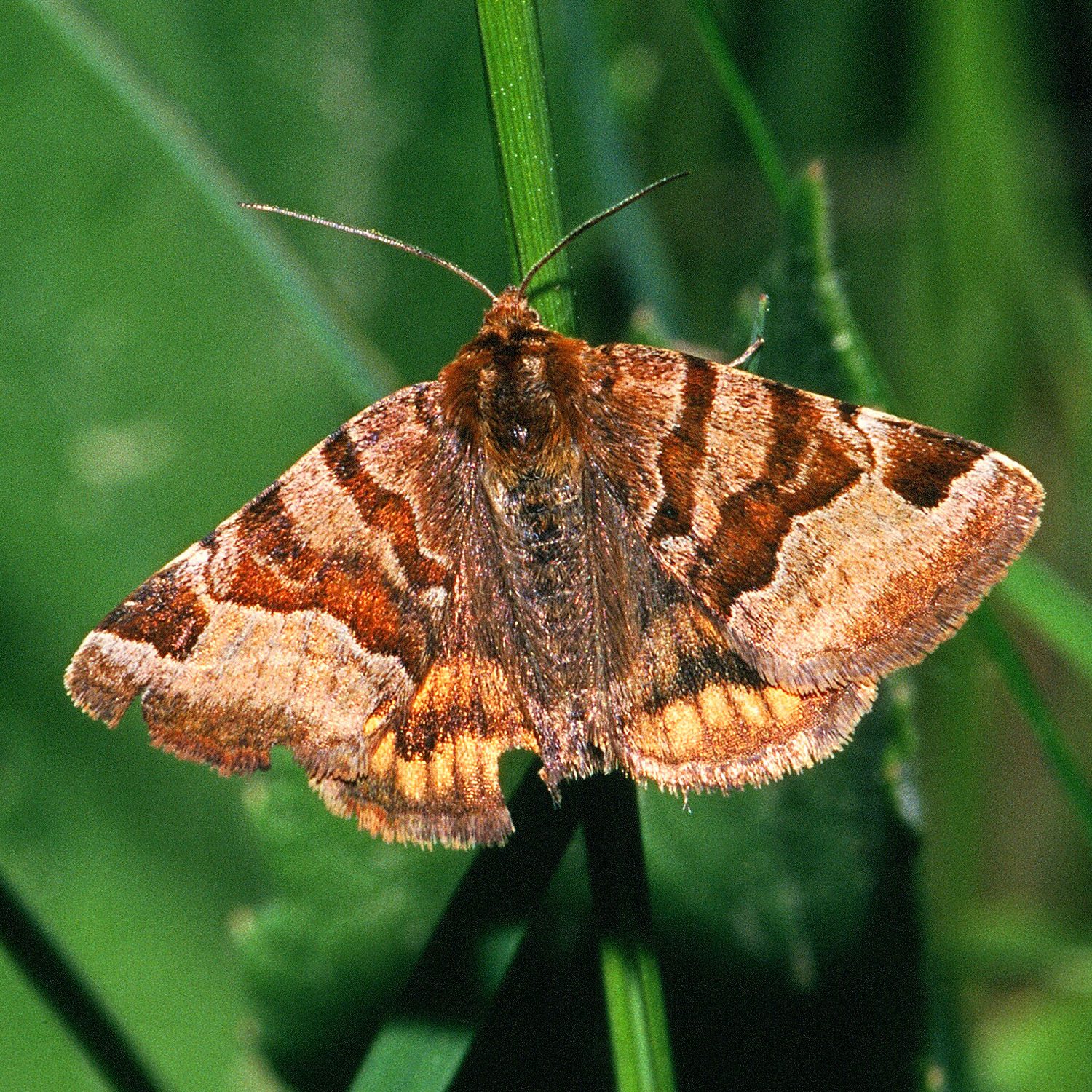
- Euclidia glyphica (Burnet Companion)

Scientific classification
- Domain: Eukaryota
- Kingdom: Animalia
- Phylum: Arthropoda
- Class: Insecta
- Order: Lepidoptera
- Superfamily: Noctuoidea
- Family: Erebidae
- Tribe: Euclidiini
- Genus: Euclidia; Ochsenheimer, 1816

Synonyms
- Ectypa Billberg, 1820; Euclidiana Rákosy, 1985; Euclidina McDunnough, 1937; Gonospileia Hubner, 1823

= Euclidia =

Genus of moths

Euclidia is a genus of moths in the family Erebidae.

== Taxonomy ==
The genus Callistege was previously included as a subgenus of Euclidia.

== Species ==
- Subgenus Euclidia
  - Euclidia ardita Franclemont, 1957 – erebid moth
  - Euclidia consors Butler, 1878
  - Euclidia cuspidea Hübner, 1818 – toothed somberwing
  - Euclidia dentata Staudinger, 1892
  - Euclidia glyphica (Linnaeus, 1758) – burnet companion
  - Euclidia limbosa Guenee, 1852
  - Euclidia tarsalis Walker, 1865
  - Euclidia vittata Philippi, 1860
- Subgenus Gonospileia Hubner, 1823
  - Euclidia amudarya Weisert, 1998
  - Euclidia munita Hübner, 1813
  - Euclidia triquetra Denis & Schiffermüller, 1775
