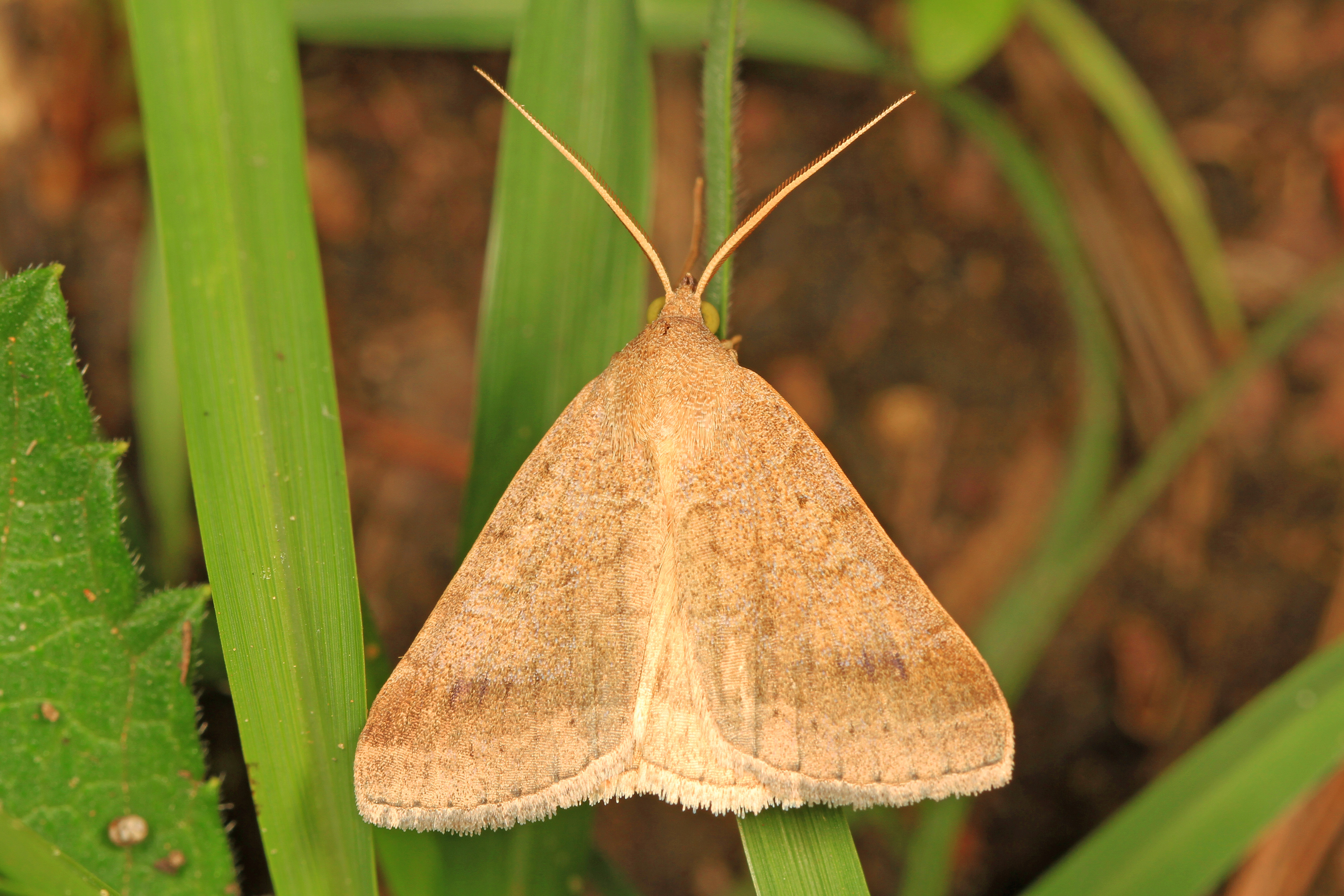
- Adult
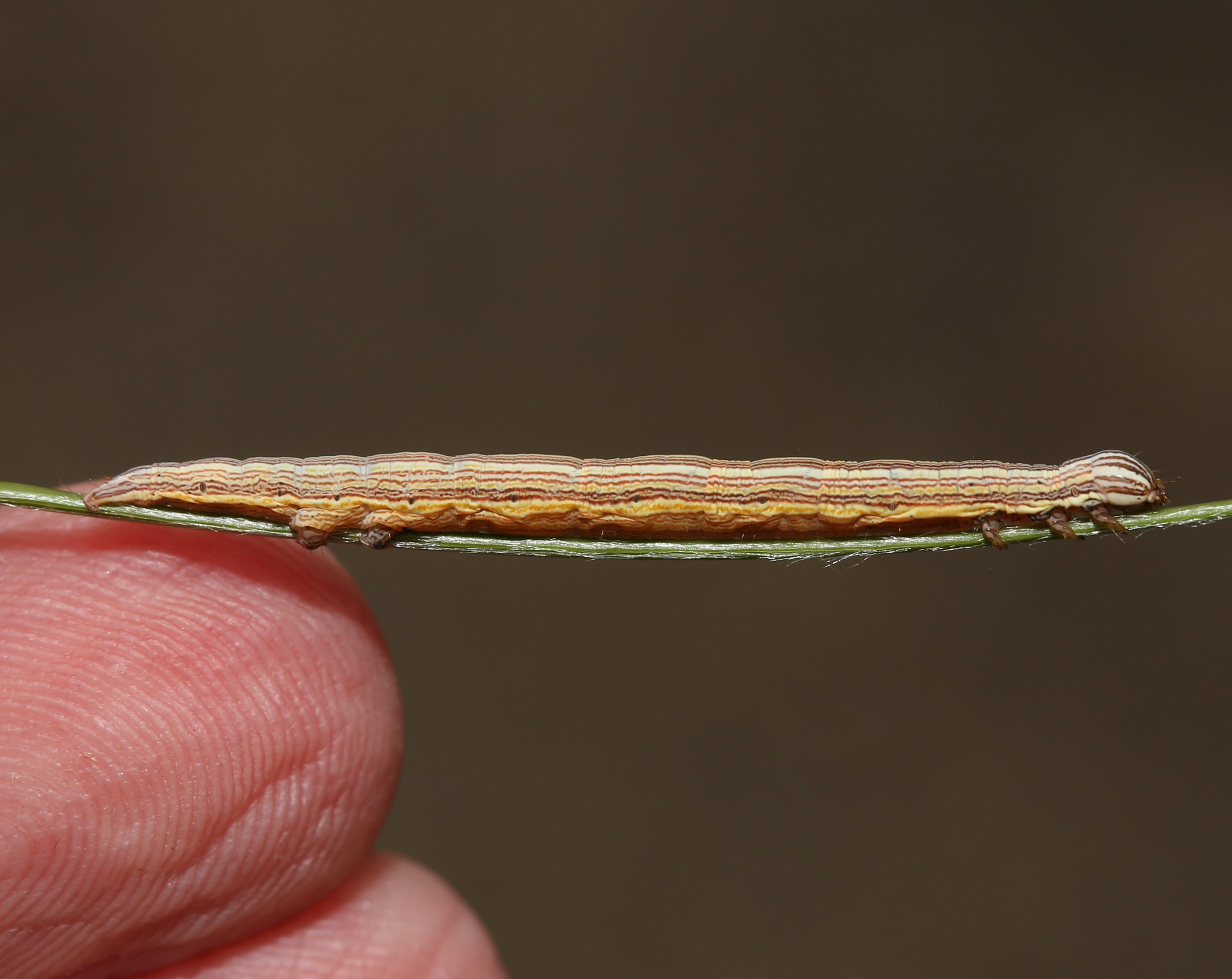
- Larva

Scientific classification
- Kingdom: Animalia
- Phylum: Arthropoda
- Class: Insecta
- Order: Lepidoptera
- Superfamily: Noctuoidea
- Family: Erebidae
- Genus: Caenurgia
- Species: C. chloropha

Binomial name
- Caenurgia chloropha (Hübner, 1818)

Synonyms
- Xestia chloropha Hübner, 1818; Drasteria chlorophis Herrich-Schäffer, 1869; Drasteria convalescens Guenée, 1852; Caenurgia convalescens; Caenurgia purgata Walker, 1858; Caenurgia socors Walker, 1858

= Caenurgia chloropha =

Vetch looper moth

Species of moth

Caenurgia chloropha, the vetch looper moth, is a moth of the family Erebidae. The species was first described by Jacob Hübner in 1818. It is found in the south-eastern United States, northern Mexico and Cuba. Strays may be found as far north as southern Ontario.

The wingspan is about 27–36 mm. There are two or more generations per year with adults on wing from April to October.

The larvae feed on vetch and other legumes. Full-grown larvae may be found from May onward.
