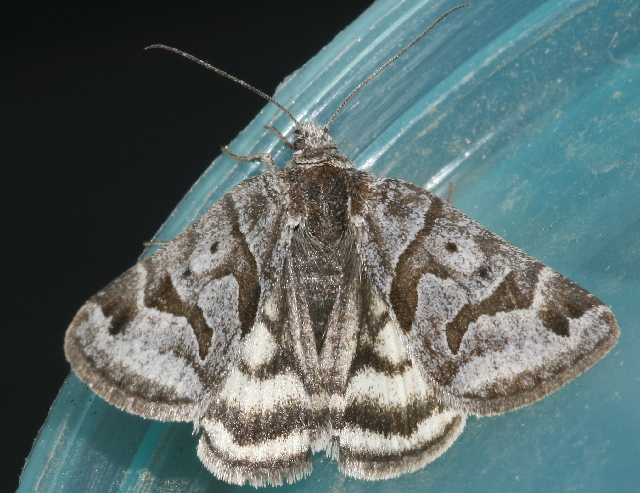

Scientific classification
- Domain: Eukaryota
- Kingdom: Animalia
- Phylum: Arthropoda
- Class: Insecta
- Order: Lepidoptera
- Superfamily: Noctuoidea
- Family: Erebidae
- Genus: Caenurgina
- Species: C. annexa

Binomial name
- Caenurgina annexa (H. Edwards, 1890)

Synonyms
- Euclidia annexa H. Edwards, 1890; Euclidimera annexa; Drasteria conspicua Smith, 1900

= Caenurgina annexa =

Banded grass moth

Species of moth

Caenurgina annexa, the banded grass moth, is a species of moth in the family Erebidae. The species was described by Henry Edwards in 1890. It is found in western North America from western Alberta and Montana to British Columbia, Washington, and Oregon.

The wingspan is 28–30 mm. Adults are on wing from May to June depending on the location.
