= Euclidia dentata =

Scientific classification
- Domain: Eukaryota
- Kingdom: Animalia
- Phylum: Arthropoda
- Class: Insecta
- Order: Lepidoptera
- Superfamily: Noctuoidea
- Family: Erebidae
- Genus: Euclidia
- Species: E. dentata

Binomial name
- Euclidia dentata Staudinger, 1892

Species of moth

Euclidia dentata is a moth of the family Erebidae. It is found in Russia (Siberia, Altai, Ussuri, Amur, Primorje), China and Korea.
