= Ptichodis bistriga =

Scientific classification
- Kingdom: Animalia
- Phylum: Arthropoda
- Class: Insecta
- Order: Lepidoptera
- Superfamily: Noctuoidea
- Family: Erebidae
- Genus: Ptichodis
- Species: P. bistriga

Binomial name
- Ptichodis bistriga (Herrich-Schäffer, 1869)

Synonyms
- Phurys bistriga Herrich-Schäffer, 1869

Species of moth

Ptichodis bistriga is a moth of the family Erebidae first described by Gottlieb August Wilhelm Herrich-Schäffer in 1869. It is found on Cuba.
