= Celiptera carbonensis =

Scientific classification
- Domain: Eukaryota
- Kingdom: Animalia
- Phylum: Arthropoda
- Class: Insecta
- Order: Lepidoptera
- Superfamily: Noctuoidea
- Family: Erebidae
- Genus: Celiptera
- Species: C. carbonensis

Binomial name
- Celiptera carbonensis Barbut & Lalanne-Cassou, 2003

Species of moth

Celiptera carbonensis is a moth of the family Erebidae. It is found in Peru.
