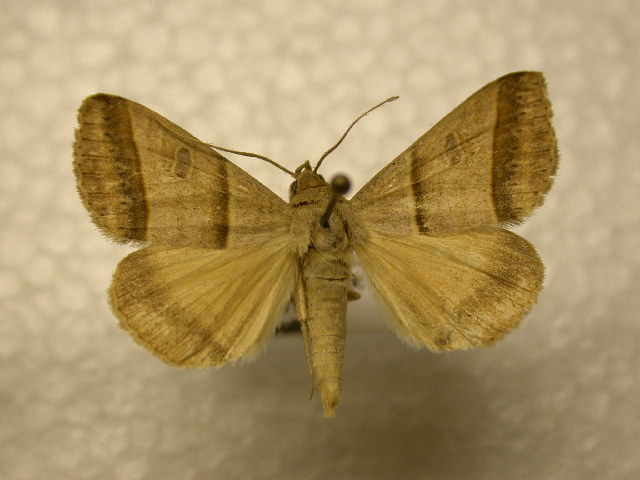

Scientific classification
- Kingdom: Animalia
- Phylum: Arthropoda
- Clade: Pancrustacea
- Class: Insecta
- Order: Lepidoptera
- Superfamily: Noctuoidea
- Family: Erebidae
- Genus: Ptichodis
- Species: P. immunis

Binomial name
- Ptichodis immunis (Guenee, 1852)

Synonyms
- Phurys immunis Guenee, 1852; Phurys tussia Guenee 1852; Ptichodis immunis f. immunella Strand

= Ptichodis immunis =

Species of moth

Ptichodis immunis is a moth of the family Erebidae. It is found in Mexico (Chiapas, Oaxaca, Yucatán), Belize, Costa Rica, Ecuador, Suriname, French Guiana, Venezuela, Brazil (Amazonas, Mato Grosso), Barbados, Cuba, Martinique, Guadeloupe, St. Kitts, Antigua and Barbuda, Hispaniola, St. Vincent, Grenada, Puerto Rico, Jamaica, the Virgin Islands, as well as in the United States, where it has been recorded from Georgia, Florida and Texas.

Adults are on wing from March to April in Florida and Georgia and from October to November in Texas.
