= Ptichodis basilans =

Scientific classification
- Kingdom: Animalia
- Phylum: Arthropoda
- Class: Insecta
- Order: Lepidoptera
- Superfamily: Noctuoidea
- Family: Erebidae
- Genus: Ptichodis
- Species: P. basilans

Binomial name
- Ptichodis basilans (Guenée, 1852)

Synonyms
- Phurys basilans Guenée, 1852; Hormisa abeluxalis Walker, 1859; Phurys asseverans Walker, 1858; Euclidia tephrina Felder & Rogenhofer, 1874

Species of moth

Ptichodis basilans is a moth of the family Erebidae. It is found in Honduras, French Guiana, Venezuela, Brazil (Bahia, Espirito Santo, Rio de Janeiro, Santa Catarina, Rio Grande do Sul) and Paraguay.
