= Callistege regia =

Scientific classification
- Domain: Eukaryota
- Kingdom: Animalia
- Phylum: Arthropoda
- Class: Insecta
- Order: Lepidoptera
- Superfamily: Noctuoidea
- Family: Erebidae
- Genus: Callistege
- Species: C. regia

Binomial name
- Callistege regia (Staudinger, 1888)

Synonyms
- Euclidia regia Staudinger, 1888

Species of moth

Callistege regia is a moth of the family Erebidae. It is found in Russia (western Siberia), Afghanistan, Tajikistan and Kyrgyzstan.
