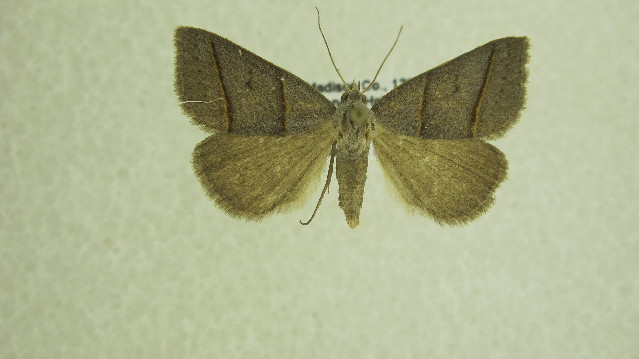

Scientific classification
- Kingdom: Animalia
- Phylum: Arthropoda
- Class: Insecta
- Order: Lepidoptera
- Superfamily: Noctuoidea
- Family: Erebidae
- Genus: Ptichodis
- Species: P. bistrigata

Binomial name
- Ptichodis bistrigata Hübner, 1818

= Ptichodis bistrigata =

Species of moth

Ptichodis bistrigata, the southern ptichodis moth, is a moth of the family Erebidae. It is found in North America, where it has been recorded from Texas to Florida, north to Massachusetts and west to Wisconsin.

The wingspan is about 22 mm. Adults have been recorded on wing from March to August.
