= Ptichodis bucetum =

Scientific classification
- Kingdom: Animalia
- Phylum: Arthropoda
- Class: Insecta
- Order: Lepidoptera
- Superfamily: Noctuoidea
- Family: Erebidae
- Genus: Ptichodis
- Species: P. bucetum

Binomial name
- Ptichodis bucetum (Grote, 1883)

Synonyms
- Celiptera bucetum Grote, 1883; Phurys campanilis Smith, 1905

Species of moth

Ptichodis bucetum is a moth of the family Erebidae. It is found in North America, where it has been recorded from Arizona, New Mexico and Utah.

The wingspan is about 30 mm. Adults have been recorded on wing from June to August.
