= Ptichodis ovalis =

Scientific classification
- Kingdom: Animalia
- Phylum: Arthropoda
- Class: Insecta
- Order: Lepidoptera
- Superfamily: Noctuoidea
- Family: Erebidae
- Genus: Ptichodis
- Species: P. ovalis

Binomial name
- Ptichodis ovalis (Grote, 1883)

Synonyms
- Phurys ovalis Grote, 1883; Phurys monaxa Schaus, 1901

Species of moth

Ptichodis ovalis is a moth of the family Erebidae. It is found in Mexico (Oaxaca) and the United States, where it has been recorded from Arizona, New Mexico and Texas.

The wingspan is 28–33 mm. Adults have been recorded on wing from May to August.
