= Euclidia limbosa =

Scientific classification
- Kingdom: Animalia
- Phylum: Arthropoda
- Clade: Pancrustacea
- Class: Insecta
- Order: Lepidoptera
- Superfamily: Noctuoidea
- Family: Erebidae
- Genus: Euclidia
- Species: E. limbosa

Binomial name
- Euclidia limbosa Guenée, 1852

Species of moth

Euclidia limbosa is a moth of the family Erebidae. It is endemic to Senegal.
