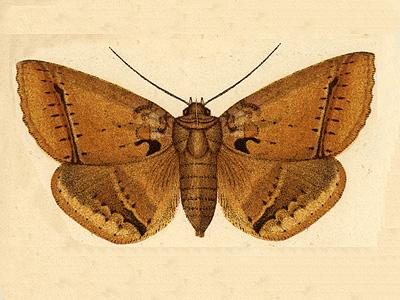
- Celiptera cometephora

Scientific classification
- Kingdom: Animalia
- Phylum: Arthropoda
- Class: Insecta
- Order: Lepidoptera
- Superfamily: Noctuoidea
- Family: Erebidae
- Tribe: Euclidiini
- Genus: Celiptera; Guenée, 1852

Synonyms
- Litomitus Grote, 1864; Paraceliptera Draudt, 1940

= Celiptera =

Genus of moths

Celiptera is a genus of moths in the family Erebidae.

== Species ==
- Celiptera carbonensis Barbut & Lalanne-Cassou, 2003
- Celiptera codo Dyar, 1912
- Celiptera cometephora Hampson, 1913
- Celiptera frustulum Guenée, 1852
- Celiptera grisescens (Schaus, 1901)
- Celiptera guerreronis (Draudt, 1940)
- Celiptera levinum (Stoll, 1782)
- Celiptera remigioides (Guenee, 1852)
- Celiptera teretilinea (Guenee, 1852)
- Celiptera thericles Schaus, 1913
- Celiptera valina Schaus, 1901
- Celiptera virginiae Barbut & Lalanne-Cassou, 2003
