= Celiptera codo =

Scientific classification
- Kingdom: Animalia
- Phylum: Arthropoda
- Class: Insecta
- Order: Lepidoptera
- Superfamily: Noctuoidea
- Family: Erebidae
- Genus: Celiptera
- Species: C. codo

Binomial name
- Celiptera codo Dyar, 1912

Synonyms
- Paraceliptera codo

Species of moth

Celiptera codo is a moth of the family Erebidae. It is found in Mexico (Puebla).
