= Celiptera valina =

Scientific classification
- Domain: Eukaryota
- Kingdom: Animalia
- Phylum: Arthropoda
- Class: Insecta
- Order: Lepidoptera
- Superfamily: Noctuoidea
- Family: Erebidae
- Genus: Celiptera
- Species: C. valina

Binomial name
- Celiptera valina (Schaus, 1901)

Synonyms
- Mocis valina Schaus, 1901; Celiptera valinum (Schaus 1901)

Species of moth

Celiptera valina is a moth of the family Erebidae. It is found in North America, including Texas and Arizona.

The wingspan of Celiptera valina is about 34 mm. In the wild Celiptera larvae feed on low growing members of the legume family (Fabaceae).
