= Celiptera guerreronis =

Scientific classification
- Domain: Eukaryota
- Kingdom: Animalia
- Phylum: Arthropoda
- Class: Insecta
- Order: Lepidoptera
- Superfamily: Noctuoidea
- Family: Erebidae
- Genus: Celiptera
- Species: C. guerreronis

Binomial name
- Celiptera guerreronis (Draudt, 1940)

Synonyms
- Paraceliptera guerreronis Draudt, 1940

Species of moth

Celiptera guerreronis is a moth of the family Erebidae. It is found on Mexico (Guerrero).
