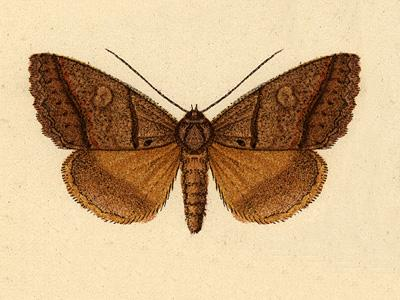
- Ptichodes herbarum

Scientific classification
- Kingdom: Animalia
- Phylum: Arthropoda
- Clade: Pancrustacea
- Class: Insecta
- Order: Lepidoptera
- Superfamily: Noctuoidea
- Family: Erebidae
- Tribe: Euclidiini
- Genus: Ptichodis; Hübner, 1818

= Ptichodis =

Genus of moths

Ptichodis is a genus of moths in the family Erebidae. The genus was erected by Jacob Hübner in 1818.

== Species ==
- Ptichodis agrapta (Hampson, 1913)
- Ptichodis basilans (Guenée, 1852)
- Ptichodis bistriga (Herrich-Schäffer, 1869)
- Ptichodis bistrigata Hübner, 1818
- Ptichodis bucetum Grote, 1883
- Ptichodis fasciata (E. D. Jones, 1921)
- Ptichodis herbarum Guenée, 1852
- Ptichodis immunis Guenée, 1852
- Ptichodis infecta (Walker, 1858)
- Ptichodis ovalis Grote, 1883
- Ptichodis pacalis Walker, 1858
- Ptichodis surrufula (Dyar, 1913)
- Ptichodis vinculum Guenée, 1852
