= Callistege diagonalis =

Scientific classification
- Kingdom: Animalia
- Phylum: Arthropoda
- Class: Insecta
- Order: Lepidoptera
- Superfamily: Noctuoidea
- Family: Erebidae
- Genus: Callistege
- Species: C. diagonalis

Binomial name
- Callistege diagonalis (Dyar, 1898)

Synonyms
- Euclidia diagonalis Dyar, 1898

Species of moth

Callistege diagonalis is a moth of the family Erebidae. It is found in North America, including Arizona and New Mexico.

The wingspan is about 28 mm.
