= Ptichodis fasciata =

Scientific classification
- Domain: Eukaryota
- Kingdom: Animalia
- Phylum: Arthropoda
- Class: Insecta
- Order: Lepidoptera
- Superfamily: Noctuoidea
- Family: Erebidae
- Genus: Ptichodis
- Species: P. fasciata

Binomial name
- Ptichodis fasciata (E. D. Jones, 1921)

Synonyms
- Phurys fasciata E. D. Jones, 1921

Species of moth

Ptichodis fasciata is a moth of the family Erebidae first described by E. Dukinfield Jones in 1921. It is found in Paraná, Brazil.
