= Ptichodis agrapta =

Scientific classification
- Kingdom: Animalia
- Phylum: Arthropoda
- Class: Insecta
- Order: Lepidoptera
- Superfamily: Noctuoidea
- Family: Erebidae
- Genus: Ptichodis
- Species: P. agrapta

Binomial name
- Ptichodis agrapta (Hampson, 1913)

Synonyms
- Phurys agrapta Hampson, 1913

Species of moth

Ptichodis agrapta is a moth of the family Erebidae. It is found on Guyana.
