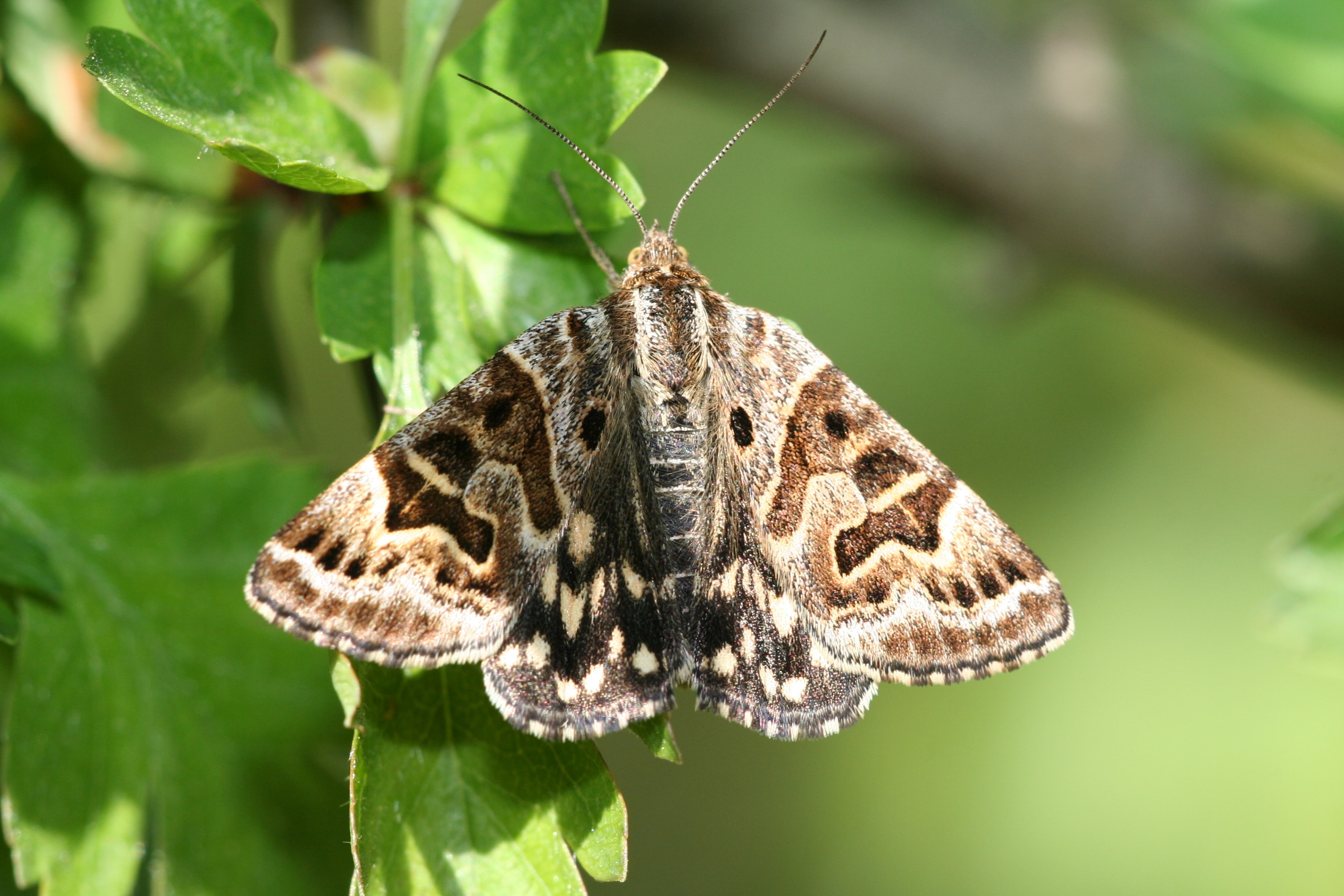
- Callistege mi

Scientific classification
- Kingdom: Animalia
- Phylum: Arthropoda
- Clade: Pancrustacea
- Class: Insecta
- Order: Lepidoptera
- Superfamily: Noctuoidea
- Family: Erebidae
- Tribe: Euclidiini
- Genus: Callistege; Hübner, 1823

Synonyms
- Euclidimera Hampson, 1913

= Callistege =

Genus of moths

Callistege is a genus of moths in the family Erebidae.

== Taxonomy ==
The genus was considered a subgenus of Euclidia by some authors but has been reinstated as a genus.

== Species ==
- Callistege diagonalis Dyar, 1898
- Callistege fortalitium Tauscher, 1809
- Callistege futilis Staudinger, 1897
- Callistege intercalaris Grote, 1882
- Callistege mi (Clerck, 1759)
- Callistege regia Staudinger, 1888
- Callistege triangula Barnes & McDunnough, 1918
