= Celiptera thericles =

Scientific classification
- Domain: Eukaryota
- Kingdom: Animalia
- Phylum: Arthropoda
- Class: Insecta
- Order: Lepidoptera
- Superfamily: Noctuoidea
- Family: Erebidae
- Genus: Celiptera
- Species: C. thericles

Binomial name
- Celiptera thericles Schaus, 1913

Species of moth

Celiptera thericles is a moth of the family Erebidae. It is found in French Guiana.
