= Celiptera grisescens =

Scientific classification
- Domain: Eukaryota
- Kingdom: Animalia
- Phylum: Arthropoda
- Class: Insecta
- Order: Lepidoptera
- Superfamily: Noctuoidea
- Family: Erebidae
- Genus: Celiptera
- Species: C. grisescens

Binomial name
- Celiptera grisescens (Schaus, 1901)

Synonyms
- Mocis grisescens Schaus, 1901

Species of moth

Celiptera grisescens is a moth of the family Erebidae. It is found in Mexico (Veracruz).
