= Ptichodis surrufula =

Scientific classification
- Kingdom: Animalia
- Phylum: Arthropoda
- Class: Insecta
- Order: Lepidoptera
- Superfamily: Noctuoidea
- Family: Erebidae
- Genus: Ptichodis
- Species: P. surrufula

Binomial name
- Ptichodis surrufula (Dyar, 1913)

Synonyms
- Celiptera surrufula Dyar, 1913; Argyrostrotis surrufula

Species of moth

Ptichodis surrufula is a moth of the family Erebidae. It is found in San Luis Potosí, Mexico.
