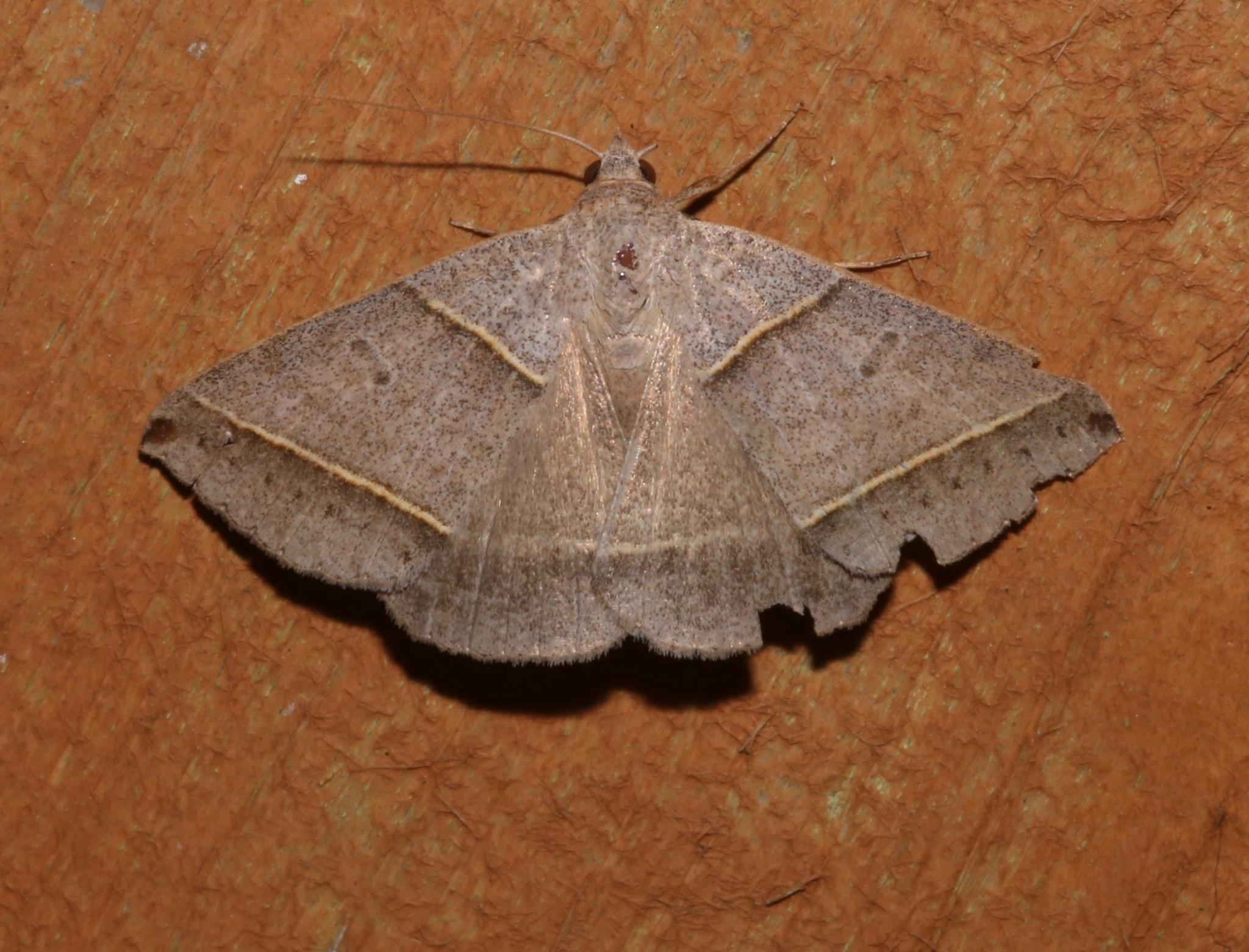

Scientific classification
- Kingdom: Animalia
- Phylum: Arthropoda
- Class: Insecta
- Order: Lepidoptera
- Superfamily: Noctuoidea
- Family: Erebidae
- Genus: Ptichodis
- Species: P. vinculum

Binomial name
- Ptichodis vinculum (Guenée, 1852)

Synonyms
- Phurys vinculum Felder & Rogenhofer, 1874

= Ptichodis vinculum =

Black-tipped ptichodis moth

Species of moth

Ptichodis vinculum, the black-tipped ptichodis moth, is a moth of the family Erebidae. It is found in the United States, where it has been recorded from Alabama, Florida, Georgia, Louisiana, Mississippi, Missouri, New Jersey, New York, South Carolina and Texas. The habitat consists of coastal marshy areas.

The wingspan is 34 mm. Adults have been recorded on wing year round in Florida.
