= Ptichodis pacalis =

Scientific classification
- Kingdom: Animalia
- Phylum: Arthropoda
- Class: Insecta
- Order: Lepidoptera
- Superfamily: Noctuoidea
- Family: Erebidae
- Genus: Ptichodis
- Species: P. pacalis

Binomial name
- Ptichodis pacalis (Walker, 1858)

Synonyms
- Poaphila pacalis Walker, 1858; Poaphila irrorata Grote, 1878

Species of moth

Ptichodis pacalis is a moth of the family Erebidae. It is found in North America, where it has been recorded from Florida and Georgia.

The wingspan is about 27 mm. Adults have been recorded on wing from February to June.
