= Perasia helvina =

Scientific classification
- Kingdom: Animalia
- Phylum: Arthropoda
- Class: Insecta
- Order: Lepidoptera
- Superfamily: Noctuoidea
- Family: Noctuidae (?)
- Genus: Perasia
- Species: P. helvina

Binomial name
- Perasia helvina (Guenée, 1852)

Synonyms
- Nymbis helvina Guenée, 1852; Phurys helveola Herrich-Schäffer, 1869

Species of moth

Perasia helvina is a moth of the family Noctuidae first described by Achille Guenée in 1852. It is found in Mexico, Costa Rica and Cuba.
