= Caenurgina caerulea =

Scientific classification
- Domain: Eukaryota
- Kingdom: Animalia
- Phylum: Arthropoda
- Class: Insecta
- Order: Lepidoptera
- Superfamily: Noctuoidea
- Family: Erebidae
- Genus: Caenurgina
- Species: C. caerulea

Binomial name
- Caenurgina caerulea (Grote, 1873)

Synonyms
- Drasteria caerulea Grote 1873; Euclidimera caerulea; Euclidia aquamarina Felder & Rogenhofer, 1874; Drasteria livida Letcher, 1896

Species of moth

Caenurgina caerulea, the cerulean looper moth, is a moth of the family Erebidae. It is found in large parts of North America, including California, and British Columbia.
