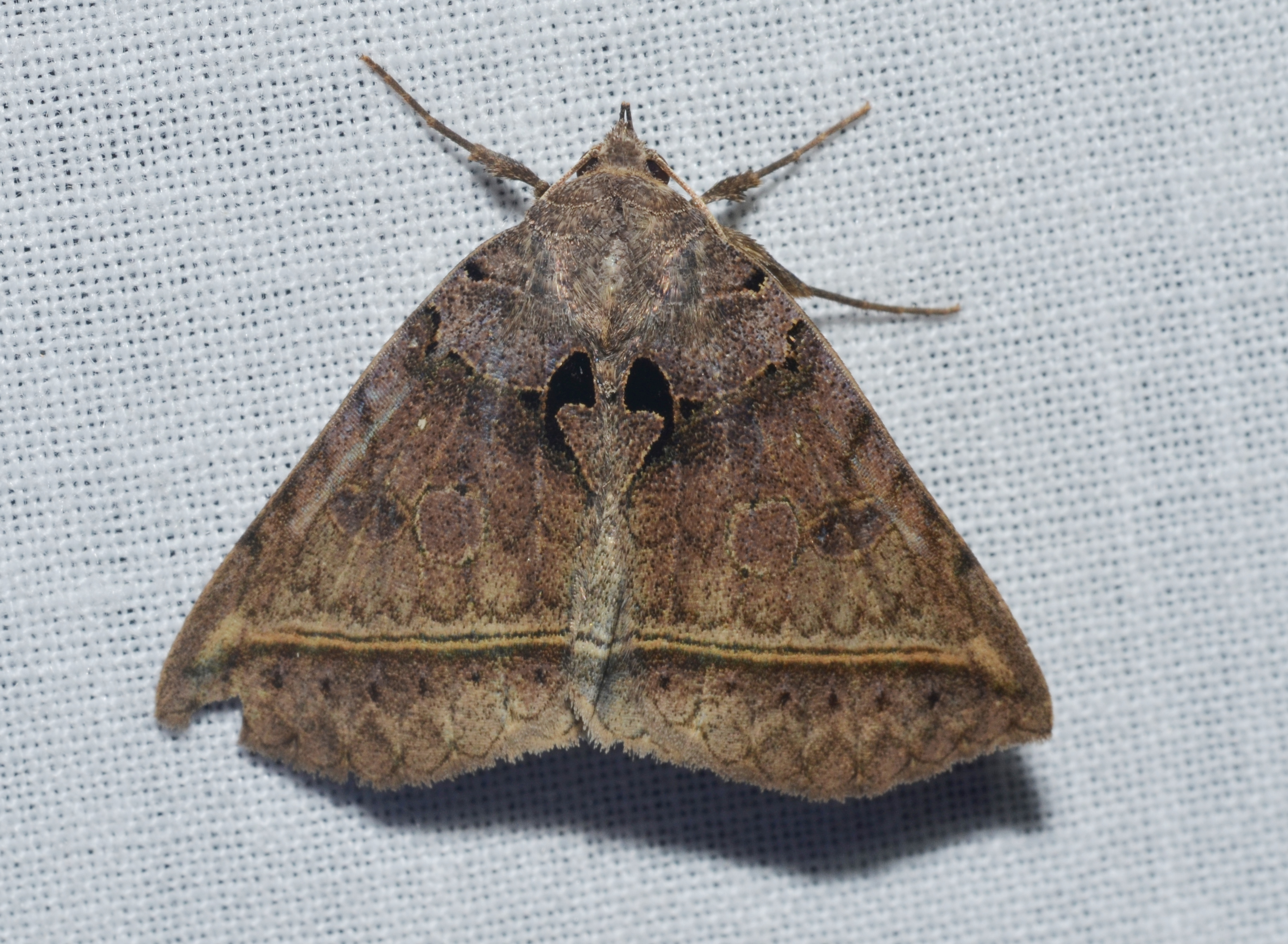

Scientific classification
- Kingdom: Animalia
- Phylum: Arthropoda
- Class: Insecta
- Order: Lepidoptera
- Superfamily: Noctuoidea
- Family: Erebidae
- Genus: Celiptera
- Species: C. frustulum

Binomial name
- Celiptera frustulum Guenée, 1852

Synonyms
- Litomitus elongatus Grote, 1864; Celiptera elongatus (Grote, 1864); Remigia discissa Walker, 1865; Celiptera discissa (Walker, 1865)

= Celiptera frustulum =

Species of moth

Celiptera frustulum, the black bit moth, is a moth of the family Erebidae. It is found in eastern North America, as far north as Ontario.

The wingspan is 34–41 mm. Adults are on wing from May to June in two generations.

The larvae feed on Robinia pseudoacacia.
