= Euclidia vittata =

Scientific classification
- Kingdom: Animalia
- Phylum: Arthropoda
- Class: Insecta
- Order: Lepidoptera
- Superfamily: Noctuoidea
- Family: Erebidae
- Genus: Euclidia
- Species: E. vittata

Binomial name
- Euclidia vittata Philippi, 1860

Species of moth

Euclidia vittata is a moth of the family Erebidae found in Chile.
