= Celiptera virginiae =

Scientific classification
- Domain: Eukaryota
- Kingdom: Animalia
- Phylum: Arthropoda
- Class: Insecta
- Order: Lepidoptera
- Superfamily: Noctuoidea
- Family: Erebidae
- Genus: Celiptera
- Species: C. virginiae

Binomial name
- Celiptera virginiae Barbut & Lalanne-Cassou, 2003

Species of moth

Celiptera virginiae is a moth of the family Erebidae. It is found in Bolivia.
