= Euclidia amudarya =

Scientific classification
- Domain: Eukaryota
- Kingdom: Animalia
- Phylum: Arthropoda
- Class: Insecta
- Order: Lepidoptera
- Superfamily: Noctuoidea
- Family: Erebidae
- Genus: Euclidia
- Species: E. amudarya

Binomial name
- Euclidia amudarya (Weisert, 1998)

Species of moth

Euclidia amudarya is a moth of the family Erebidae found in Turkmenistan.
