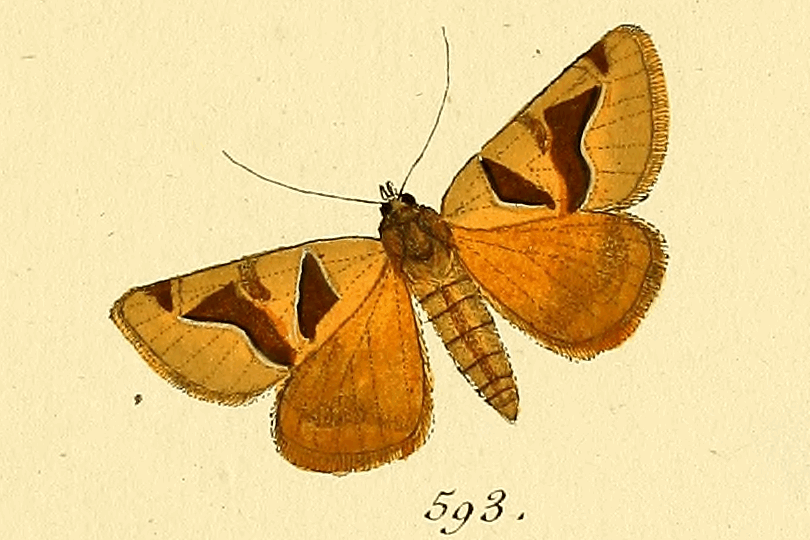

Scientific classification
- Kingdom: Animalia
- Phylum: Arthropoda
- Class: Insecta
- Order: Lepidoptera
- Superfamily: Noctuoidea
- Family: Erebidae
- Genus: Euclidia
- Species: E. munita

Binomial name
- Euclidia munita (Hübner, 1813)

Synonyms
- Noctua munita Hübner, 1813; Euclidia angulosa Eversmann, 1832; Euclidia immunita Milliére, 1868

= Euclidia munita =

Species of moth

Euclidia munita is a moth of the family Erebidae first described by Jacob Hübner in 1813. It is found in Ukraine, south-western Russia, Kazakhstan, Tajikistan, Turkmenistan, Kyrgyzstan, northern Iran, Afghanistan, China and Mongolia.

The wingspan is about 32 mm.

The larvae feed on Glycyrrhiza species.
