= Leucomelas =

Scientific classification
- Kingdom: Animalia
- Phylum: Arthropoda
- Class: Insecta
- Order: Lepidoptera
- Superfamily: Noctuoidea
- Family: Erebidae
- Tribe: Euclidiini
- Genus: Leucomelas; Hampson, 1913
- Species: L. juvenilis

Binomial name
- Leucomelas juvenilis (Bremer, 1861)

Synonyms
- Agnomonia juvenilis Bremer, 1861; Euclidia juvenilis

Genus of moths

Leucomelas is a genus of moths of the family Erebidae. It contains only one species, Leucomelas juvenilis, which is found in Russia (south-eastern Siberia, Amur, Ussuri, Primorje), China and Korea.

The length of the forewings is about 17 mm.
