= Celiptera remigioides =

Scientific classification
- Kingdom: Animalia
- Phylum: Arthropoda
- Class: Insecta
- Order: Lepidoptera
- Superfamily: Noctuoidea
- Family: Erebidae
- Genus: Celiptera
- Species: C. remigioides

Binomial name
- Celiptera remigioides (Guenee, 1852)

Synonyms
- Ophiodes remigioides Guenee, 1852; Drasteria magnifica Edwards, 1884

Species of moth

Celiptera remigioides is a moth of the family Erebidae. It is found from Mexico (Veracruz) to Brazil, Ecuador and the Galapagos Islands.
