= Celiptera levinum =

Scientific classification
- Kingdom: Animalia
- Phylum: Arthropoda
- Class: Insecta
- Order: Lepidoptera
- Superfamily: Noctuoidea
- Family: Erebidae
- Genus: Celiptera
- Species: C. levinum

Binomial name
- Celiptera levinum (Stoll, 1782)

Synonyms
- Phalaena levina Stoll, 1782; Mocis alvina Guenee, 1852; Mocis aurinia Geyer, 1832; Mocis pallidior Guenee, 1852; Mocis pertusa Felder & Rogenhofer, 1874; Ophiusa variolosa Walker, 1858; Athyrma cordigera Walker, 1869

Species of moth

Celiptera levinum is a moth of the family Erebidae. It is found in Surinam, Colombia, Brazil (Rondonia, Espirito Santo, Rio de Janeiro, São Paulo, Santa Catarina), Haiti, the Dominican Republic and Cuba.
