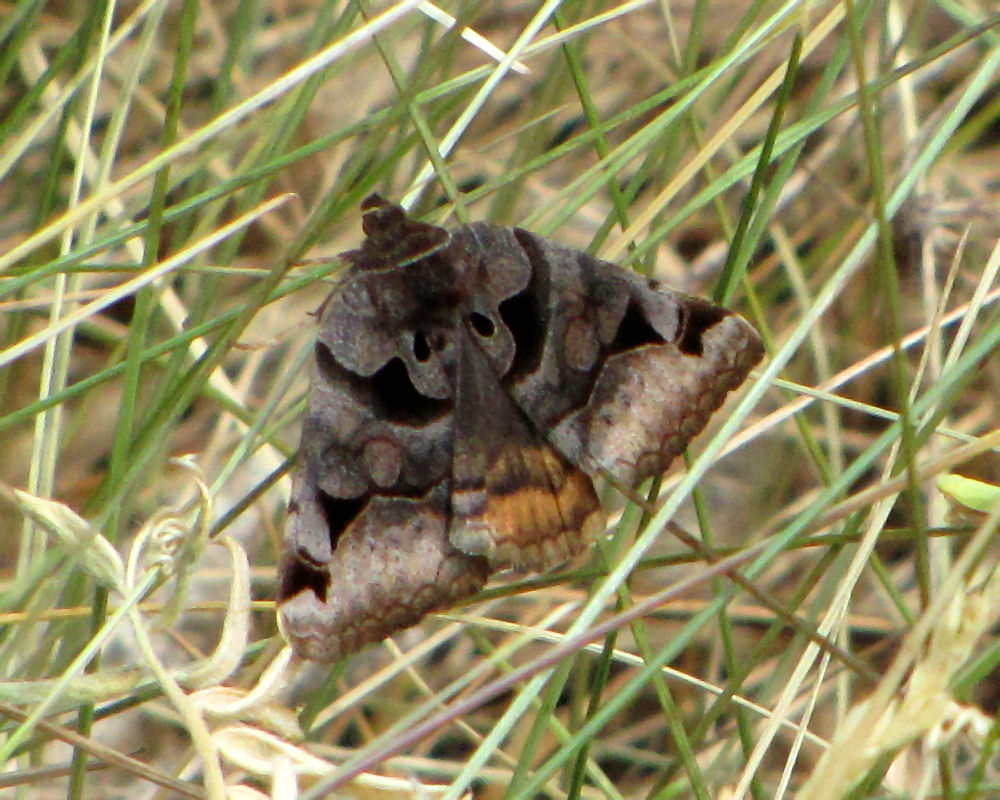

Scientific classification
- Kingdom: Animalia
- Phylum: Arthropoda
- Class: Insecta
- Order: Lepidoptera
- Superfamily: Noctuoidea
- Family: Erebidae
- Genus: Euclidia
- Species: E. cuspidea

Binomial name
- Euclidia cuspidea (Hübner, 1818)

Synonyms
- Drasteria cuspidea Hübner, 1818

= Euclidia cuspidea =

Species of moth

Euclidia cuspidea, the toothed somberwing, is a moth of the family Erebidae. The species was first described by Jacob Hübner in 1818. It is found in North America from Quebec west to western Alberta, north to the Northwest Territories and south to the Gulf of Mexico.

The wingspan is 28–36 mm. Adults are on wing from May to June depending on the location.

The larvae feed on various clovers and grasses.
