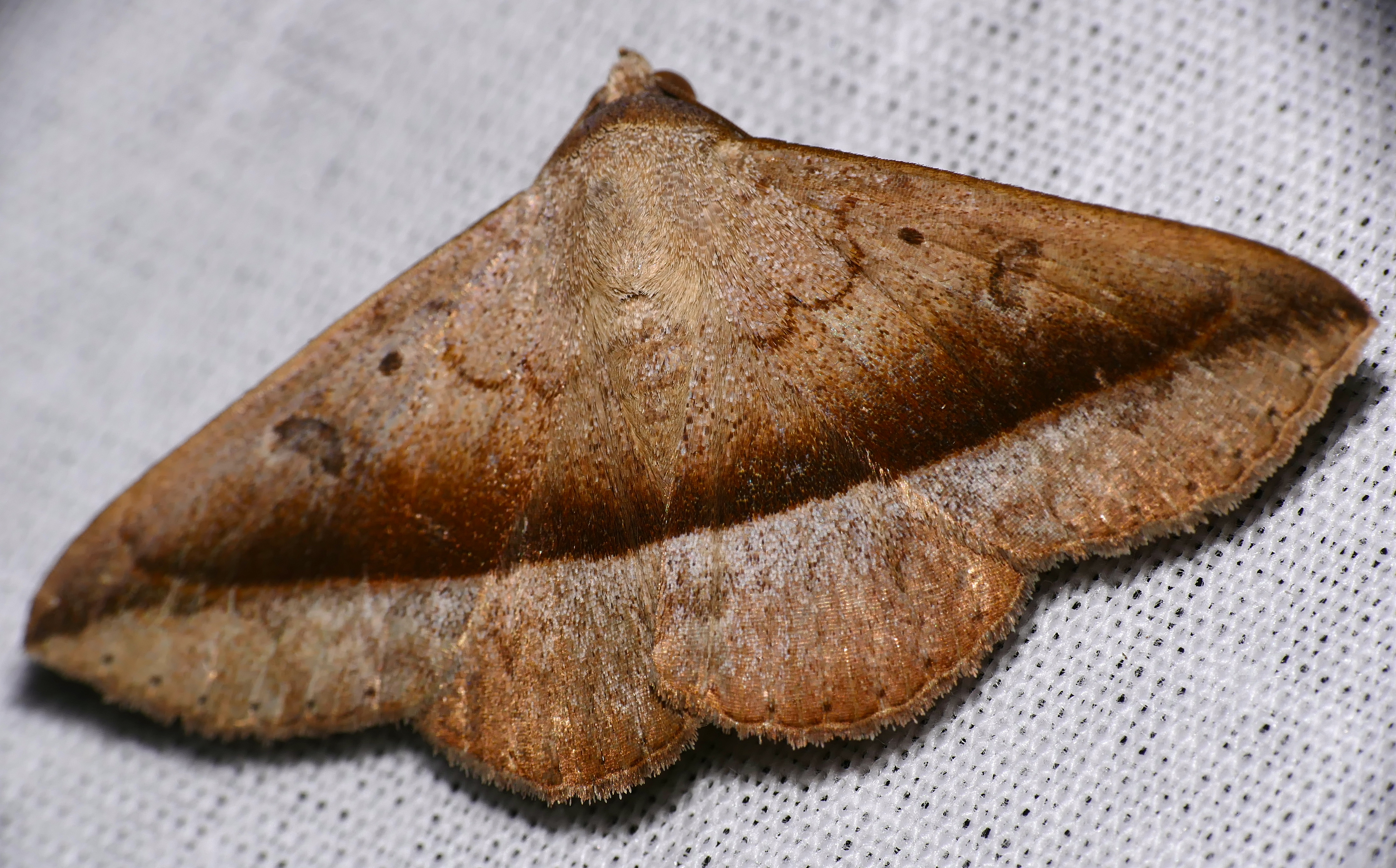

Scientific classification
- Kingdom: Animalia
- Phylum: Arthropoda
- Class: Insecta
- Order: Lepidoptera
- Superfamily: Noctuoidea
- Family: Erebidae
- Genus: Epidromia
- Species: E. poaphiloides

Binomial name
- Epidromia poaphiloides (Guenée, 1852)

Synonyms
- Bendis poaphilodes Guenée, 1852

= Epidromia poaphiloides =

Species of moth

Epidromia poaphiloides is a moth of the family Erebidae first described by Achille Guenée in 1852. It is found in Brazil, French Guiana and Guyana.
