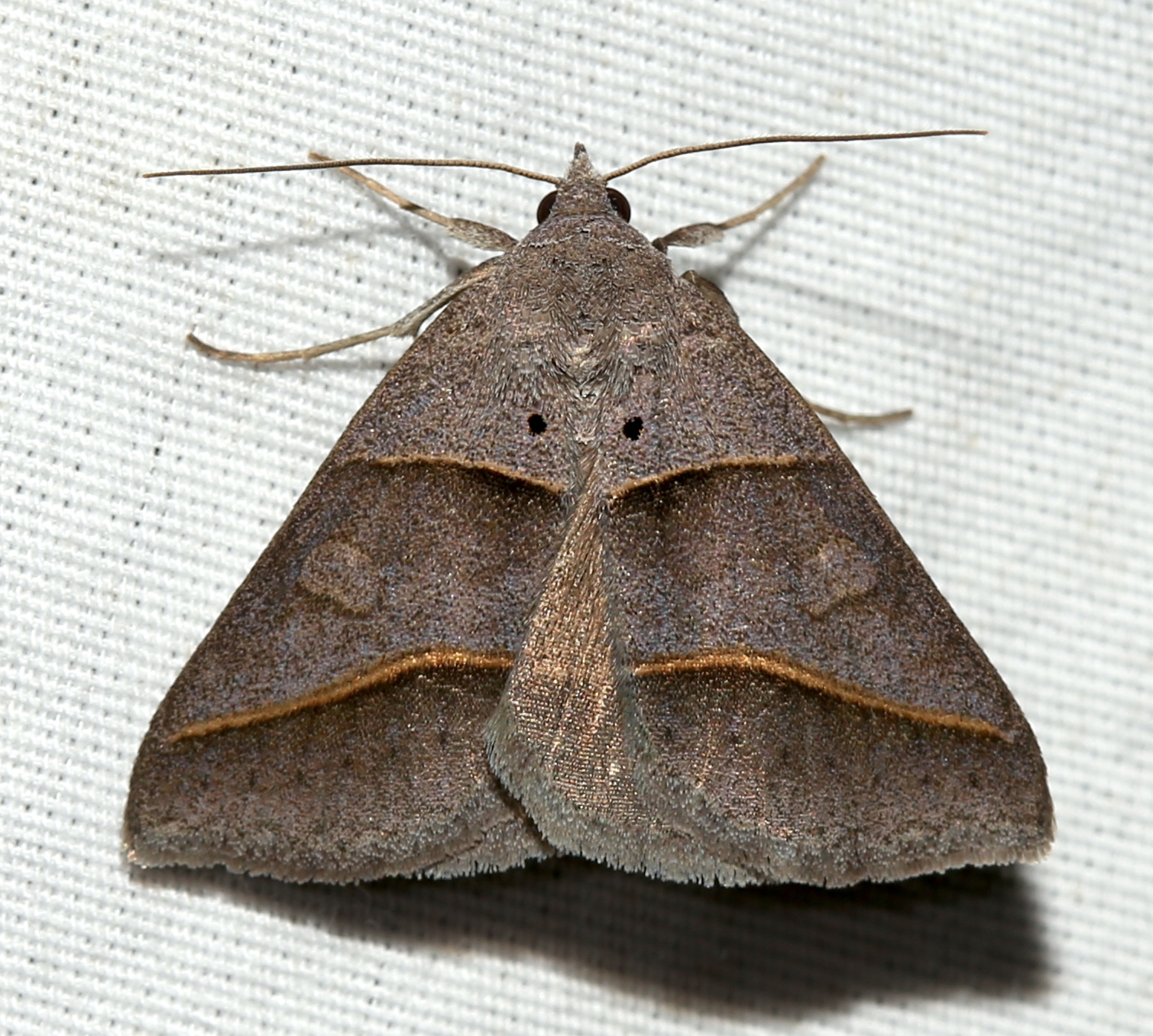

Scientific classification
- Kingdom: Animalia
- Phylum: Arthropoda
- Class: Insecta
- Order: Lepidoptera
- Superfamily: Noctuoidea
- Family: Erebidae
- Genus: Ptichodis
- Species: P. herbarum

Binomial name
- Ptichodis herbarum (Guenee, 1852)

Synonyms
- Poaphila herbarum Guenee, 1852; Ptichodes herbarum; Phurys lima Guenee, 1852; Poaphila dissocians Walker, 1858; Poaphila obversa Walker, 1858; Celiptera bifasciata Bates, 1886; Poaphila obversa Walker, 1858

= Ptichodis herbarum =

Species of moth

Ptichodis herbarum, the common ptichodis moth, is a moth in the family Erebidae. It is found in the United States (including Alabama, Florida, Georgia, Maryland, Mississippi, North Carolina, Ohio, Oklahoma, South Carolina, Tennessee, and Texas). It has also been recorded from Jamaica.

The wingspan is about 30 mm.

The larvae feed on bush clover and possibly other Lespedeza species.
