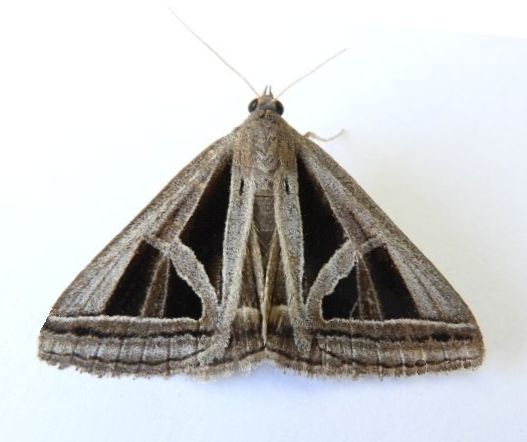

Scientific classification
- Domain: Eukaryota
- Kingdom: Animalia
- Phylum: Arthropoda
- Class: Insecta
- Order: Lepidoptera
- Superfamily: Noctuoidea
- Family: Erebidae
- Genus: Callistege
- Species: C. triangula

Binomial name
- Callistege triangula (Barnes & McDunnough, 1918)

Synonyms
- Caenurgia triangula Barnes & McDunnough, 1918; Euclidia triangula

= Callistege triangula =

Species of moth

Callistege triangula is a moth of the family Erebidae first described by William Barnes and James Halliday McDunnough in 1918. It is found in North America, where it has been recorded from Arizona, New Mexico and Texas.

The wingspan is about 30 mm. Adults are on wing from August to September.
