= Scodionyx mysticus =

Scientific classification
- Kingdom: Animalia
- Phylum: Arthropoda
- Class: Insecta
- Order: Lepidoptera
- Superfamily: Noctuoidea
- Family: Noctuidae (?)
- Genus: Scodionyx
- Species: S. mysticus

Binomial name
- Scodionyx mysticus (Guenée, 1852)

Synonyms
- Scodionyx balboi Kruger, 1939; Hypotacha boursini Warnecke, 1938; Scodionyx mysticus lepineyi Rungs, 1942

Species of moth

Scodionyx mysticus is a moth of the family Noctuidae first described by Achille Guenée in 1852. It is found in the Sahara and the Arabian Peninsula.

There is one generation per year. Adults are on wing from October to April.

The larvae feed on Acacia raddiana.
