= Euclidia consors =

Scientific classification
- Domain: Eukaryota
- Kingdom: Animalia
- Phylum: Arthropoda
- Class: Insecta
- Order: Lepidoptera
- Superfamily: Noctuoidea
- Family: Erebidae
- Genus: Euclidia
- Species: E. consors

Binomial name
- Euclidia consors Butler, 1878

Species of moth

Euclidia consors is a moth of the family Erebidae found in Japan (Honshu).
