= Epidromia consperata =

Scientific classification
- Domain: Eukaryota
- Kingdom: Animalia
- Phylum: Arthropoda
- Class: Insecta
- Order: Lepidoptera
- Superfamily: Noctuoidea
- Family: Erebidae
- Genus: Epidromia
- Species: E. consperata

Binomial name
- Epidromia consperata Dognin, 1912

Species of moth

Epidromia consperata is a moth of the family Erebidae first described by Paul Dognin in 1912. It is found in Brazil, Colombia, Costa Rica, Ecuador, Guyana and Venezuela.
