= Euclidia tarsalis =

Scientific classification
- Kingdom: Animalia
- Phylum: Arthropoda
- Class: Insecta
- Order: Lepidoptera
- Superfamily: Noctuoidea
- Family: Erebidae
- Genus: Euclidia
- Species: E. tarsalis

Binomial name
- Euclidia tarsalis Walker, 1865

Species of moth

Euclidia tarsalis is a moth of the family Erebidae found in Sri Lanka.
