= Caenurgia adusta =

Scientific classification
- Kingdom: Animalia
- Phylum: Arthropoda
- Class: Insecta
- Order: Lepidoptera
- Superfamily: Noctuoidea
- Family: Erebidae
- Genus: Caenurgia
- Species: C. adusta

Binomial name
- Caenurgia adusta (Walker, 1865)

Synonyms
- Poaphila adusta Walker, 1865

Species of moth

Caenurgia adusta is a species of moth of the family Erebidae. It is found in the Caribbean, including the Dominican Republic and Haiti.
