= Callistege intercalaris =

Scientific classification
- Kingdom: Animalia
- Phylum: Arthropoda
- Class: Insecta
- Order: Lepidoptera
- Superfamily: Noctuoidea
- Family: Erebidae
- Genus: Callistege
- Species: C. intercalaris

Binomial name
- Callistege intercalaris (Grote, 1882)

Synonyms
- Euclidia intercalaris Grote, 1882; Euclidia dyari Smith, 1903; Callistege dyari (Smith, 1903)

Species of moth

Callistege intercalaris is a moth of the family Erebidae. It is found from Arizona to Texas.

The wingspan is 30–33 mm. Adults are on wing from July to September.
