= Euclidia ardita =

Scientific classification
- Domain: Eukaryota
- Kingdom: Animalia
- Phylum: Arthropoda
- Class: Insecta
- Order: Lepidoptera
- Superfamily: Noctuoidea
- Family: Erebidae
- Genus: Euclidia
- Species: E. ardita

Binomial name
- Euclidia ardita Franclemont, 1957

Synonyms
- Callistege ardita

Species of moth

Euclidia ardita is a moth of the family Erebidae. It is found from British Columbia south to California.

The wingspan is about 32 mm.
