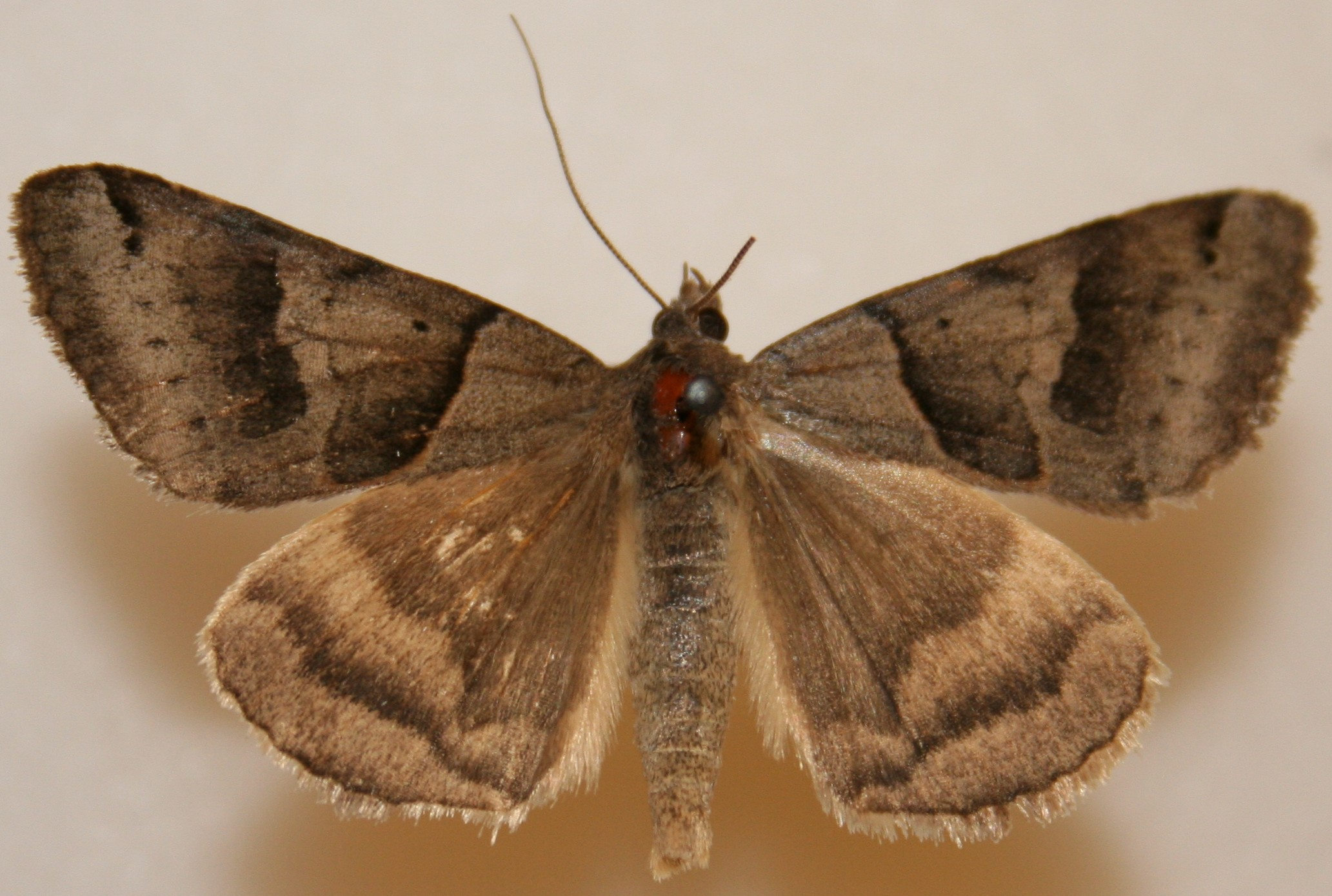
- Male
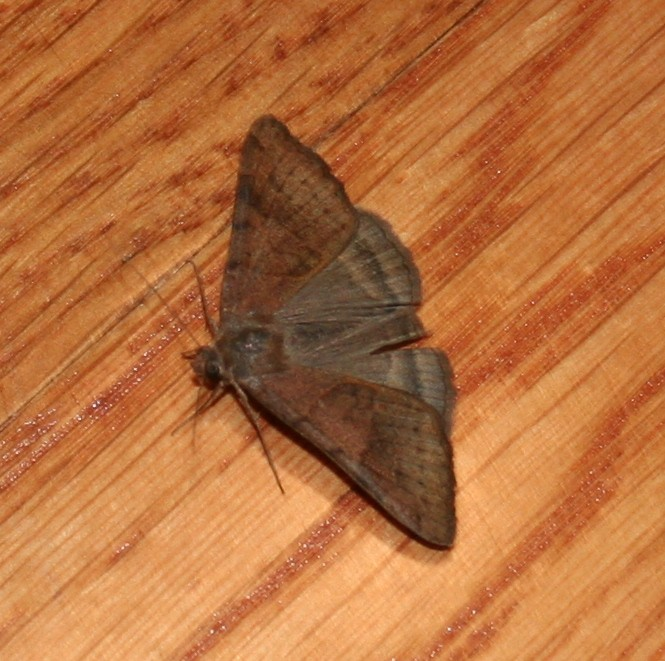
- Female

Scientific classification
- Kingdom: Animalia
- Phylum: Arthropoda
- Class: Insecta
- Order: Lepidoptera
- Superfamily: Noctuoidea
- Family: Erebidae
- Genus: Caenurgina
- Species: C. erechtea

Binomial name
- Caenurgina erechtea (Cramer, 1780)

Synonyms
- Phalaena erechtea Cramer, 1780; Drasteria agricola Grote & Robinson, 1867; Drasteria mundula Grote & Robinson, 1867; Poaphila narrata Walker, 1858; Caenurgina parva Blackmore, 1921; Poaphila patibilis Walker, 1858

= Caenurgina erechtea =

Species of moth

Caenurgina erechtea, the forage looper or common grass moth, is a moth of the family Erebidae. The species was first described by Pieter Cramer in 1780. It is found from coast to coast in the United States and adjacent parts of Canada. It is not found in Newfoundland, New Brunswick, Prince Edward Island, Yukon, or the Northwest Territories. The wingspan is 30–42 mm. Adults are on wing from March to November depending on the location.

The larvae feed on Ambrosia trifida and various species of clover, grass, and alfalfa.
