= Callistege futilis =

Scientific classification
- Kingdom: Animalia
- Phylum: Arthropoda
- Clade: Pancrustacea
- Class: Insecta
- Order: Lepidoptera
- Superfamily: Noctuoidea
- Family: Erebidae
- Genus: Callistege
- Species: C. futilis

Binomial name
- Callistege futilis (Staudinger, 1897)

Synonyms
- Euclidia futilis Staudinger, 1897

Species of moth

Callistege futilis is a moth of the family Erebidae. It was described from the Apfel Mountains.
