= Ptichodis infecta =

Scientific classification
- Kingdom: Animalia
- Phylum: Arthropoda
- Class: Insecta
- Order: Lepidoptera
- Superfamily: Noctuoidea
- Family: Erebidae
- Genus: Ptichodis
- Species: P. infecta

Binomial name
- Ptichodis infecta (Walker, 1858)

Synonyms
- Celiptera infecta Walker, 1858; Mocis refracta Walker, 1858

Species of moth

Ptichodis infecta is a moth of the family Erebidae. It is found on Hispaniola, where it has been recorded from Haiti and the Dominican Republic.
