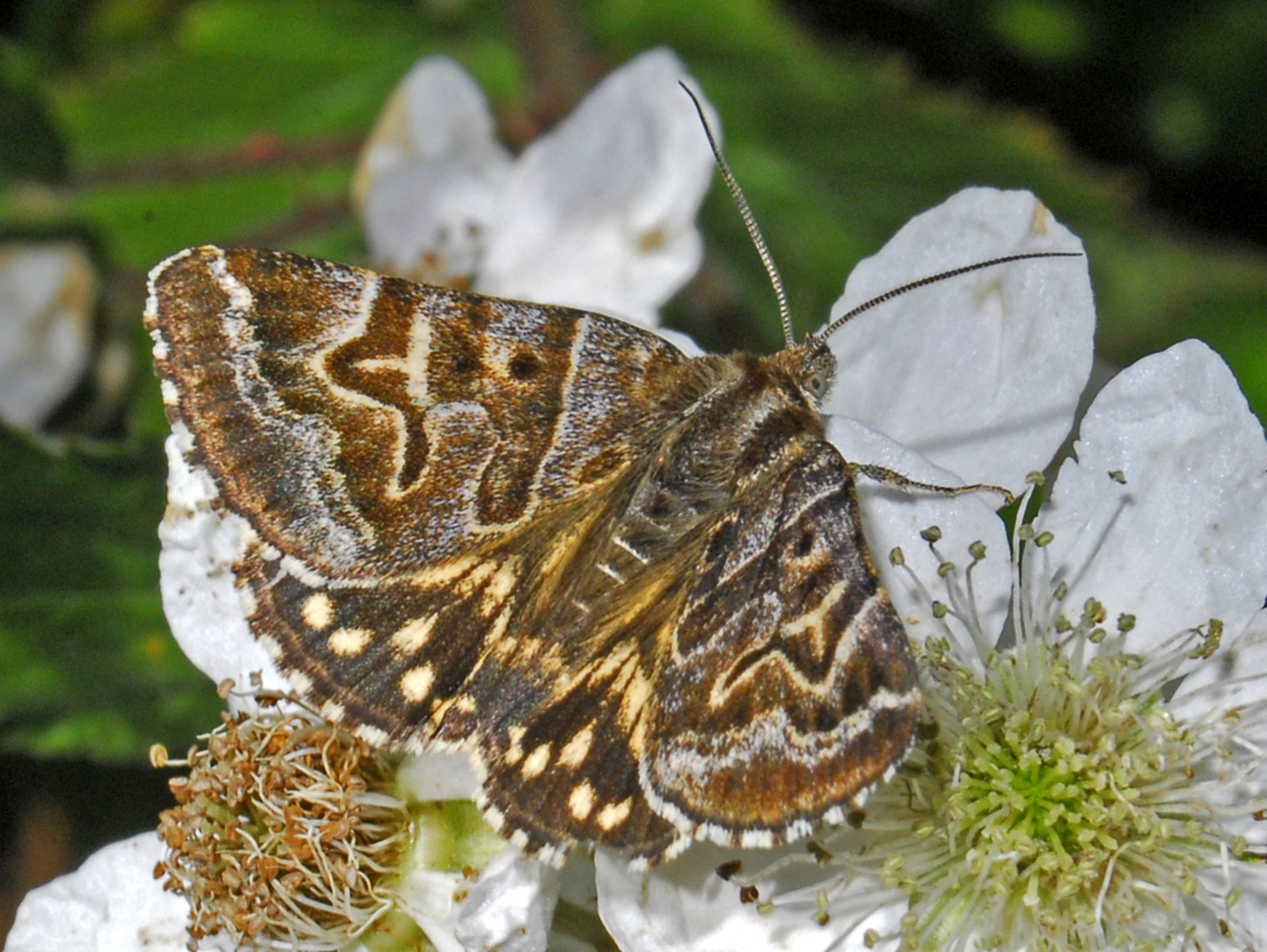
- Upperside
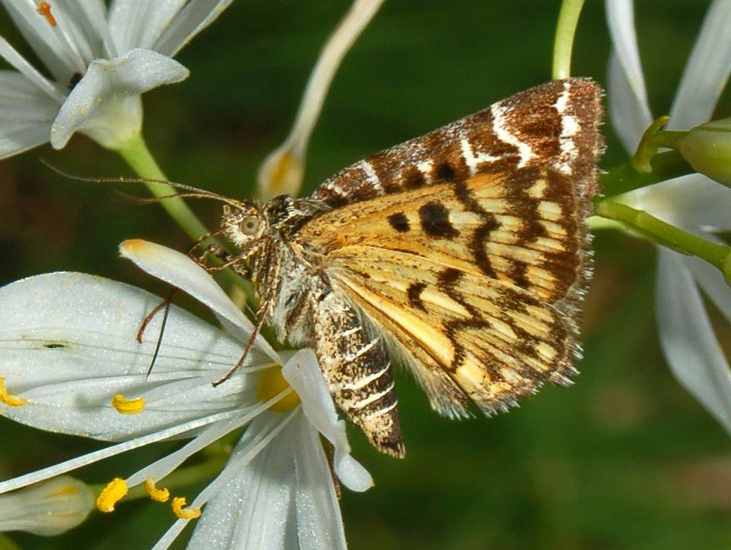
- Side view

Scientific classification
- Domain: Eukaryota
- Kingdom: Animalia
- Phylum: Arthropoda
- Class: Insecta
- Order: Lepidoptera
- Superfamily: Noctuoidea
- Family: Erebidae
- Genus: Callistege
- Species: C. mi

Binomial name
- Callistege mi (Clerck, 1759)

Synonyms
- List: Phalaena mi Clerck, 1759; Euclidia mi var. extrema; Euclidia extrema Bang-Haas, 1912; Euclidia mi; Phalaena litterata Cyrillo, 1787; Callistege litterata; Callistege mi elzei; Callistege elzei Freina, 1976

= Callistege mi =

Mother Shipton moth

Species of moth

Callistege mi, the Mother Shipton moth, is a moth of the family Erebidae. It was classified by Carl Alexander Clerck in 1759, and is also known under the name of Euclidia mi. In Finnish it is known as piirtoyökkönen and in German as Scheck-Tageule.

== Variations ==
Variations include:

- Callistege mi ab. ochrea Tutt has the ground colour of hindwing yellow; this is the usual form in Britain, where sometimes the forewing also is tinged with yellowish: the underside of both being yellow;
- Callistege mi ab. illuminata ab. nov. [Warren] is a paler form of the type in which the dark areas are restricted by the amplification of the pale spaces, the underside yellowish white; in litterata Cyr. from Italy the white is pure, the underside bluish white; but the white spots of the upperside are restricted in size;
- Callistege mi ab. extrema B.-Haas from Amurland and Central Asia, the white predominates still more over the black than in illuminata, the underside being also pure white;
- Callistege mi ab suffusa ab. nov. [Warren] from Italy, the white spaces are almost crowded out and both wings are nearly black: the underside with all the veins black and the ground colour yellowish white; ab. explanata Rbl. is a clear whitish yellow form from Bohemia;
- Callistege mi ab. aurantiaca ab. nov. [Warren] from Portugal the ground colour is orange yellow.

== Distribution ==
This species spans over most of Europe, Siberia, the Russian Far East and Asia Minor. On the British Isles it is most common in England and Wales; less so in Scotland and Ireland.

== Technical description ==
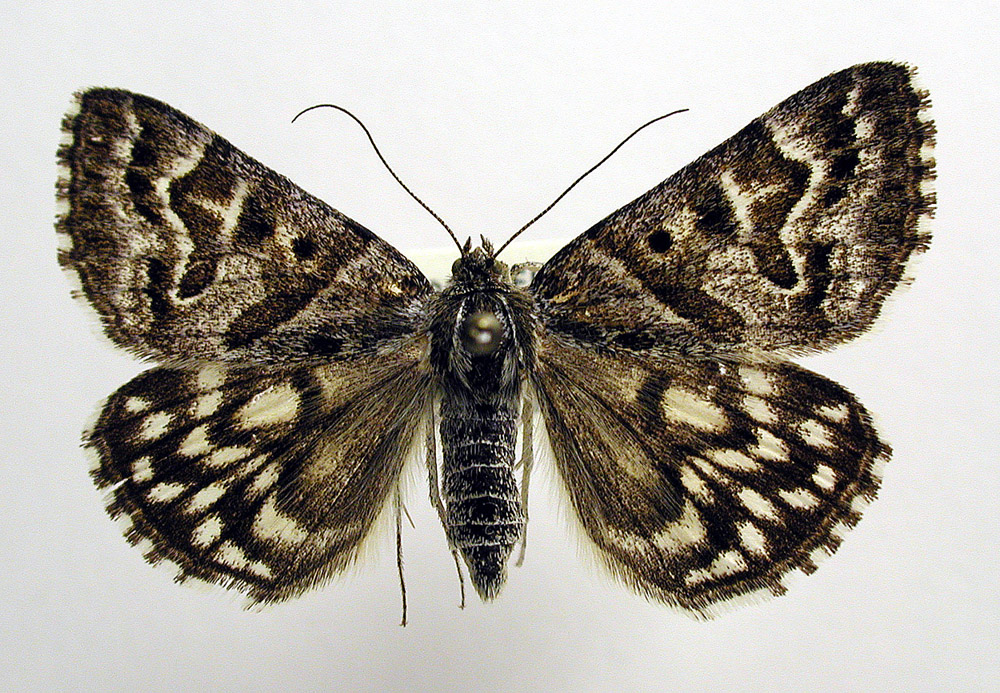
Mounted specimen

The adult moth's forewing is 13 to 16 mm (0.51 to 0.63 inches) long, and the wingspan is 25 to 30 mm (0.98 to 1.18 inches).

Forewings are black slightly dusted with grey. Lines are whitish, the subbasal ending in a grey-edged black spot on inner margin; the inner is obliquely curved outwards; the outer is angled at vein 6, indented on 4 and angled inwards below vein 2, running upwards and outwards below reniform, then downwards again parallel to its former course, and finally running in to the inner line above inner margin.

Orbicular stigma is a round black spot with grey outline; reniform large and black, edged externally by a white bar, which often emits a narrow pale line externally from its middle subterminal line sinuous, double, somewhat lunulate, with dark centre and pale-scaled edges, except at costa where it is single and white, preceded by oblong black spots separated by the pale veins. Hindwings have the cell ochreous white, containing a black cellspot; outer and subterminal sinuous series of ochreous white spots between the veins. Fringe of both wings are mottled black and white, with pale line at base; underside is ochreous white.

The larva is yellowish with a dorsal line dark, finely pale in centre and with several fine wavy lines on each side. The spiracular line is broad, dark reddish brown, edged below with yellow or red.

== Biology ==
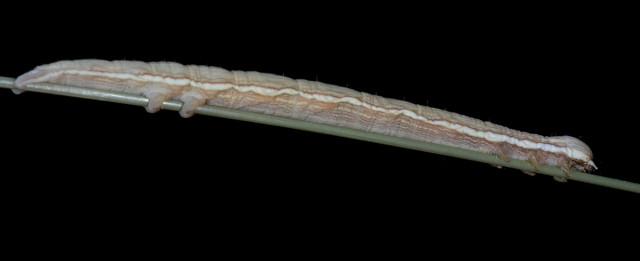
Larva

The stages of its life cycle are as follows: egg: May – September, larva: June – September, pupa: July – May, and imago: May – July.

It flies by day, normally taking only short, rapid flights, and can be found in wasteland and other open habitats.

It hibernates as a pupa, and does so in a cocoon among blades of grass, or right underneath the ground.

Among its foods is the nectar of the white clover and the creeping buttercup. The larva feeds on Elymus arenarius, Polygonum aviculare, Lathyrus pratensis, Vicia spp., Calluna vulgaris, Hypericum maculatum, Andromeda polifolia, Galium verum, Melilotus officinalis, Lotus corniculatus and Medicago lupulina.

== Human culture ==
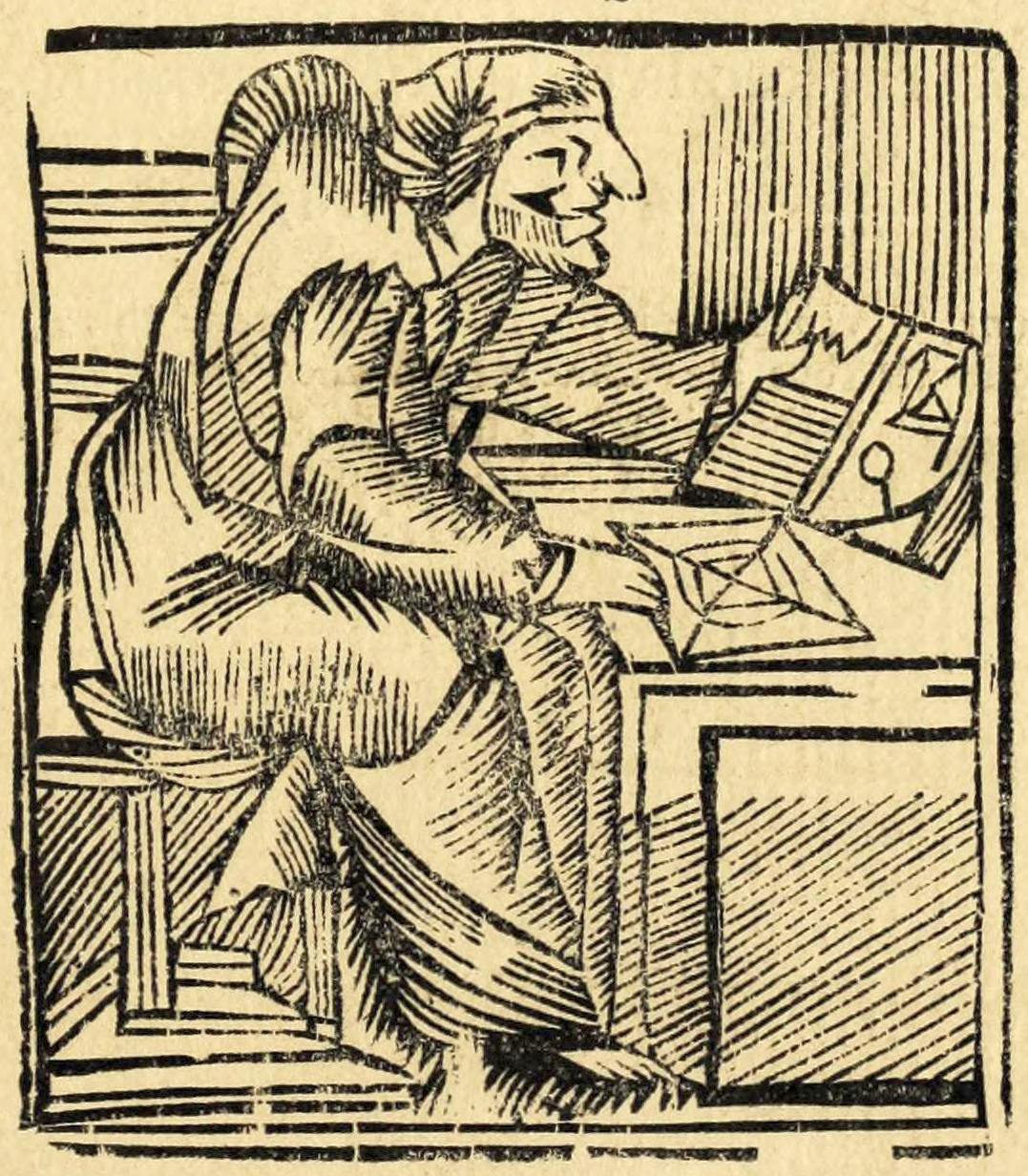
Old engraving of Mother Shipton

The popular English name for this moth comes from the pattern on its forewing. This pattern resembles the iconic representation of Ursula Southeil, known as Mother Shipton – a sixteenth-century prophetess and witch. Mother Shipton is a mostly mythical character, who supposedly foretold the death of Cardinal Wolsey in 1530. Charles Hindley, a nineteenth-century bookseller, created a prophetic poem that he claimed to be by Shipton. This poem told of "Carriages without horses" and air planes, as well as predicting the end of the world in 1881.
