= Epidromia zephyritis =

Scientific classification
- Domain: Eukaryota
- Kingdom: Animalia
- Phylum: Arthropoda
- Class: Insecta
- Order: Lepidoptera
- Superfamily: Noctuoidea
- Family: Erebidae
- Genus: Epidromia
- Species: E. zephyritis

Binomial name
- Epidromia zephyritis Schaus, 1923

Species of moth

Epidromia zephyritis is a moth of the family Noctuidae first described by William Schaus in 1923. It is endemic to the Galápagos Islands.
