= Celiptera teretilinea =

Scientific classification
- Domain: Eukaryota
- Kingdom: Animalia
- Phylum: Arthropoda
- Class: Insecta
- Order: Lepidoptera
- Superfamily: Noctuoidea
- Family: Erebidae
- Genus: Celiptera
- Species: C. teretilinea

Binomial name
- Celiptera teretilinea (Guenée, 1852)

Synonyms
- Phurys teretilinea Guenée, 1852

Species of moth

Celiptera teretilinea is a moth of the family Erebidae. It is found in southern Brazil.
