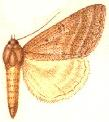

Scientific classification
- Kingdom: Animalia
- Phylum: Arthropoda
- Class: Insecta
- Order: Lepidoptera
- Superfamily: Noctuoidea
- Family: Erebidae
- Genus: Caenurgia
- Species: C. togataria

Binomial name
- Caenurgia togataria (Walker, 1862)

Synonyms
- Anaitis togataria Walker, 1862; Caenurgia adversa (Grote, 1875); Litosea adversa Grote, 1875

= Caenurgia togataria =

Species of moth

Caenurgia togataria is a species of moth of the family Erebidae. It is found in the southern parts of the United States (including California), south to Mexico.

The wingspan is about 37 mm (1.5 in).
