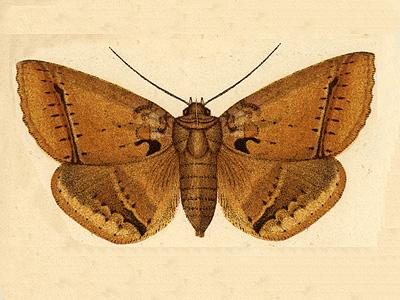

Scientific classification
- Kingdom: Animalia
- Phylum: Arthropoda
- Class: Insecta
- Order: Lepidoptera
- Superfamily: Noctuoidea
- Family: Erebidae
- Genus: Celiptera
- Species: C. cometephora

Binomial name
- Celiptera cometephora Hampson, 1913

= Celiptera cometephora =

Species of moth

Celiptera cometephora is a moth of the family Erebidae. It is found on Jamaica.
