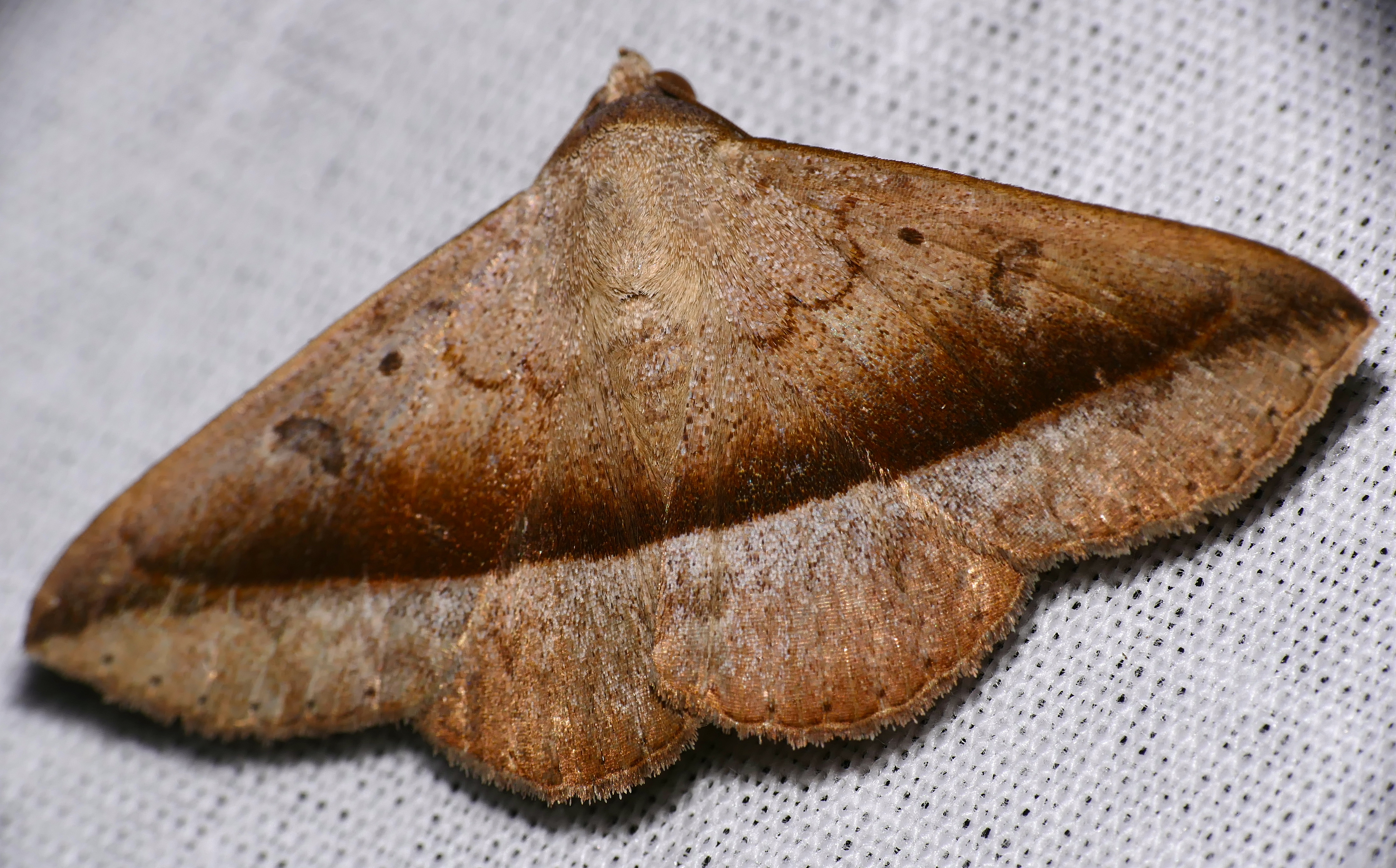
- Epidromia poaphiloides

Scientific classification
- Kingdom: Animalia
- Phylum: Arthropoda
- Class: Insecta
- Order: Lepidoptera
- Superfamily: Noctuoidea
- Family: Erebidae
- Tribe: Omopterini
- Genus: Epidromia; Guenée, 1852

= Epidromia =

Genus of moths

Epidromia is a genus of moths in the family Erebidae. The genus was erected by Achille Guenée in 1852.

== Species ==
- Epidromia arenosa Walker
- Epidromia consperata Dognin, 1912
- Epidromia flavilineata Hampson
- Epidromia lienaris Hübner, 1823
- Epidromia pannosa Guenée, 1852
- Epidromia pedestris Walker
- Epidromia poaphiloides (Guenée, 1852)
- Epidromia profecta Walker
- Epidromia rotundata Herrich-Schäffer
- Epidromia sigillata Walker
- Epidromia zephyritis Schaus, 1923
