= Homaea =

Scientific classification
- Kingdom: Animalia
- Phylum: Arthropoda
- Class: Insecta
- Order: Lepidoptera
- Superfamily: Noctuoidea
- Family: Noctuidae (?)
- Subfamily: Catocalinae
- Genus: Homaea; Guenée, 1852

Genus of moths

Homaea is a genus of moths of the family Noctuidae. The genus was erected by Achille Guenée in 1852.

== Species in Africa ==
- Homaea addisonae Hampson, 1914
- Homaea clathrum Guenée, 1852
- Homaea striatalis Hampson, 1918
