= Epidromia rotundata =

Scientific classification
- Domain: Eukaryota
- Kingdom: Animalia
- Phylum: Arthropoda
- Class: Insecta
- Order: Lepidoptera
- Superfamily: Noctuoidea
- Family: Erebidae
- Genus: Epidromia
- Species: E. rotundata

Binomial name
- Epidromia rotundata Herrich-Schäffer, 1869

Synonyms
- Epidromia fergusoni Solis, 1986

Species of moth

Epidromia rotundata is a moth of the family Noctuidae first described by Gottlieb August Wilhelm Herrich-Schäffer in 1869. It is found in the United States from Georgia to southern Florida. It is also recorded from Cuba and from xeric habitats in Mexico on the Yucatan Peninsula and on the west coast of Mexico.

The wingspan is 40–45 mm. Adults are on wing from April to September.
