= Epidromia pannosa =

Scientific classification
- Kingdom: Animalia
- Phylum: Arthropoda
- Class: Insecta
- Order: Lepidoptera
- Superfamily: Noctuoidea
- Family: Erebidae
- Genus: Epidromia
- Species: E. pannosa

Binomial name
- Epidromia pannosa Guenée, 1852

Synonyms
- Epidromia zetophora Guenée, 1852; Ophisma valida Walker, 1865

Species of moth

Epidromia pannosa is a moth of the family Noctuidae first described by Achille Guenée in 1852. It is found from southern Florida and central Mexico southward through the Caribbean and Central America to Brazil.

The larvae feed on Psidium species, including Psidium guajava.
