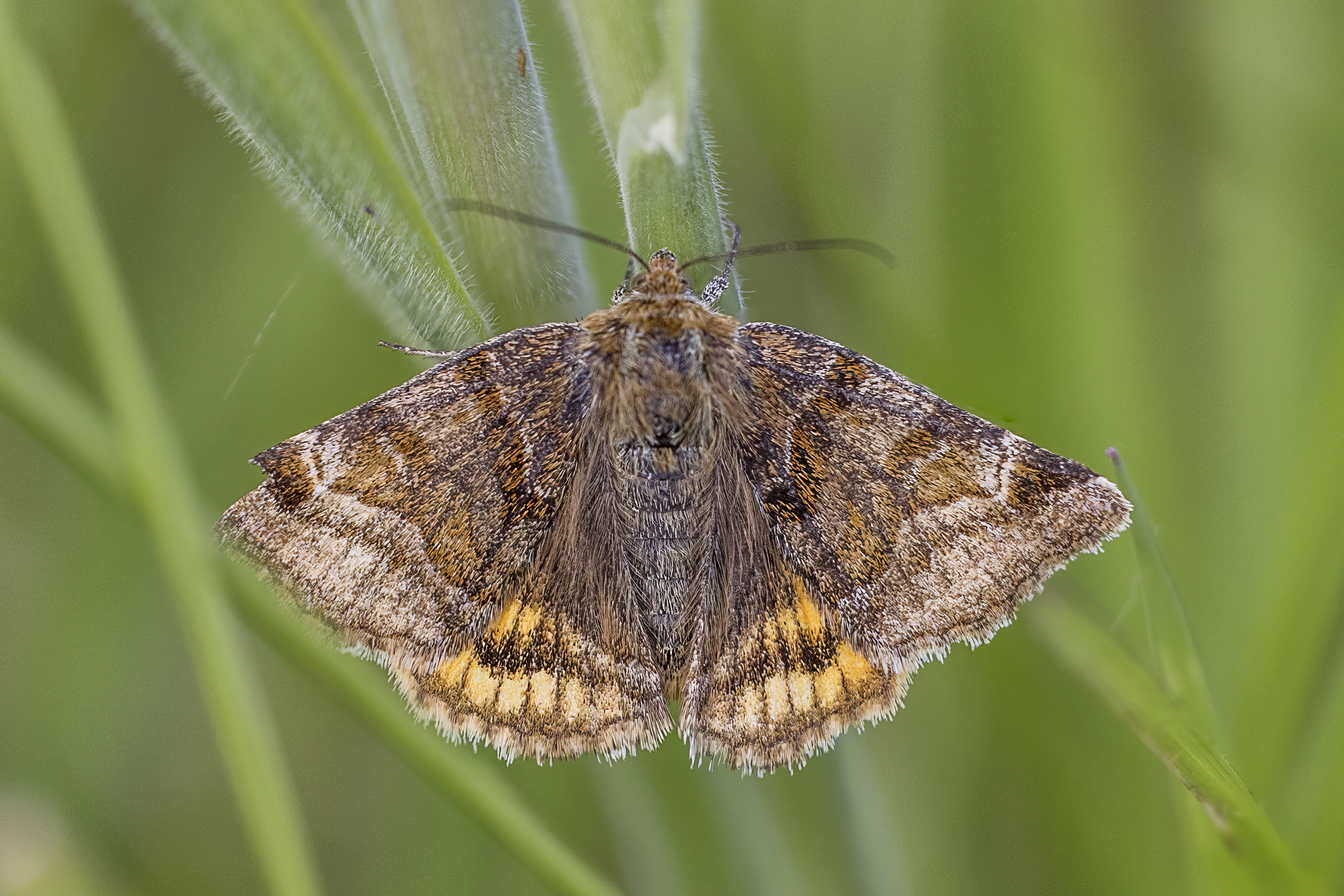
- In County Clare, Ireland

Scientific classification
- Kingdom: Animalia
- Phylum: Arthropoda
- Class: Insecta
- Order: Lepidoptera
- Superfamily: Noctuoidea
- Family: Erebidae
- Genus: Euclidia
- Species: E. glyphica

Binomial name
- Euclidia glyphica (Linnaeus, 1758)

Synonyms
- Phalaena glyphica Linnaeus, 1758

= Burnet companion =

Species of moth

The burnet companion moth (Euclidia glyphica) is a moth of the family Erebidae. It is found in most of the Palearctic realm, from Ireland in the west to Mongolia and Siberia in the east and south to the Mediterranean and North Africa.

== Technical description and variation ==
Forewing pale grey suffused with pale brown or uniform pale brown; the shadings dark olive brown; inner line pale, oblique and waved, followed by a brown band; outer line whitish, vertically waved, preceded by a brown band, the inner edge of which is the median line; at costa the outer line is excurved and accompanied by pale scales on each side; submarginal line obscure, followed by a darker diffuse band, forming a black blotch on costa: hindwing orange, the veins dark; base and inner margin fuscous; a blackish submarginal band, outwardly toothed at costa and middle; a dark terminal shade running up along veins. The more uniformly dark brown examples constitute the ab. suffusa Spul., the usual form in Britain; -ab. marginata Spul.has the subterminal area whitish ochreous; in the ab. obsoleta Strand the dark bands of the underside are wanting; the ab. tristicula Schultz is much darker than the type.

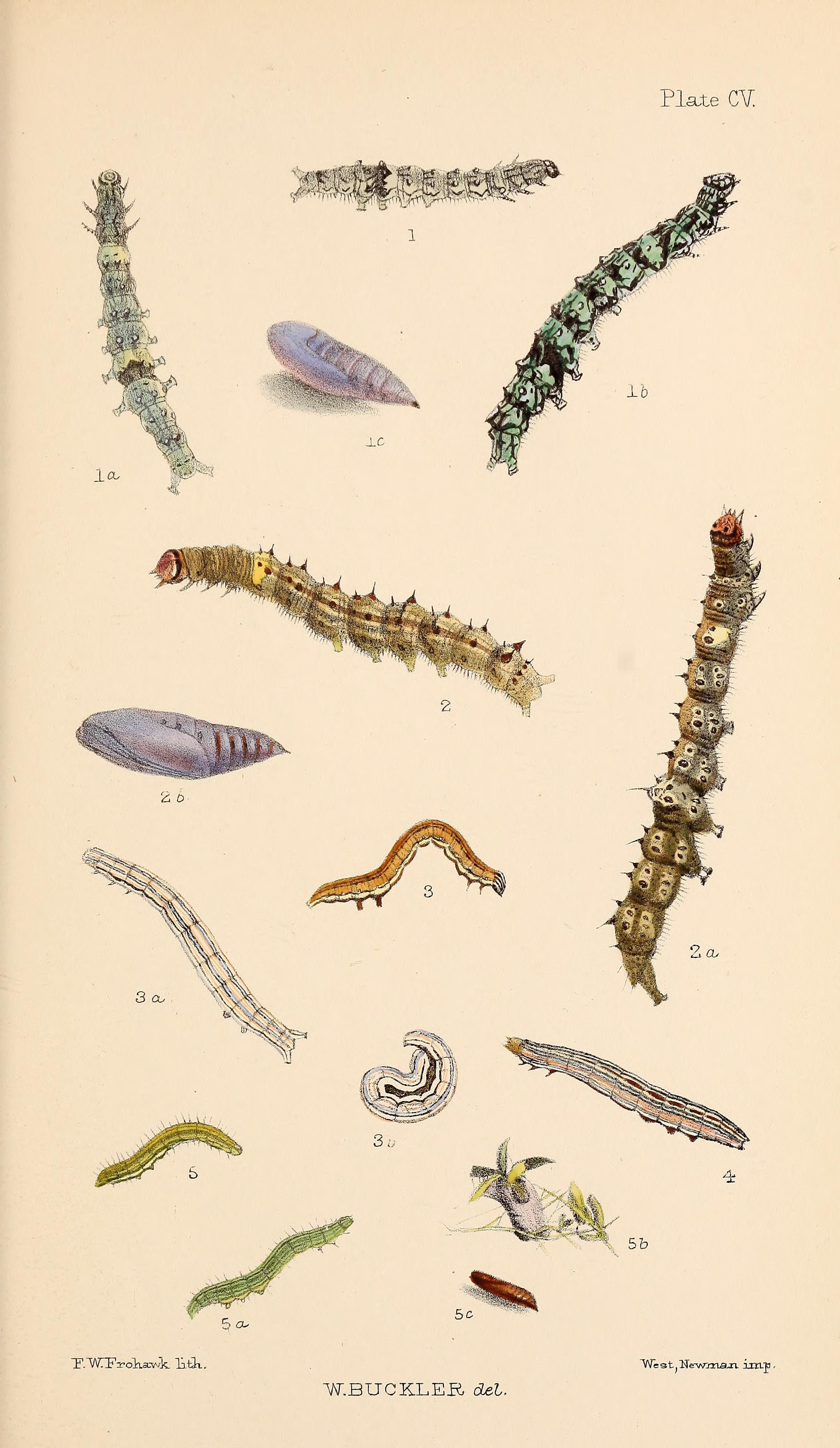
Figs 4 larvae after last moult

== Biology ==
Larva yellowish brown or reddish brown; the dorsal line darker; head yellowish brown with two dark streaks. The larvae feed on Viola, Trifolium species (especially Trifolium pratense), Medicago sativa, Lotus corniculatus, Vicia cracca, Lathyrus pratensis, and Hippocrepis comosa.
