= Melapia =

Scientific classification
- Kingdom: Animalia
- Phylum: Arthropoda
- Clade: Pancrustacea
- Class: Insecta
- Order: Lepidoptera
- Superfamily: Noctuoidea
- Family: Noctuidae (?)
- Subfamily: Catocalinae
- Genus: Melapia; Sugi, 1968

Genus of moths

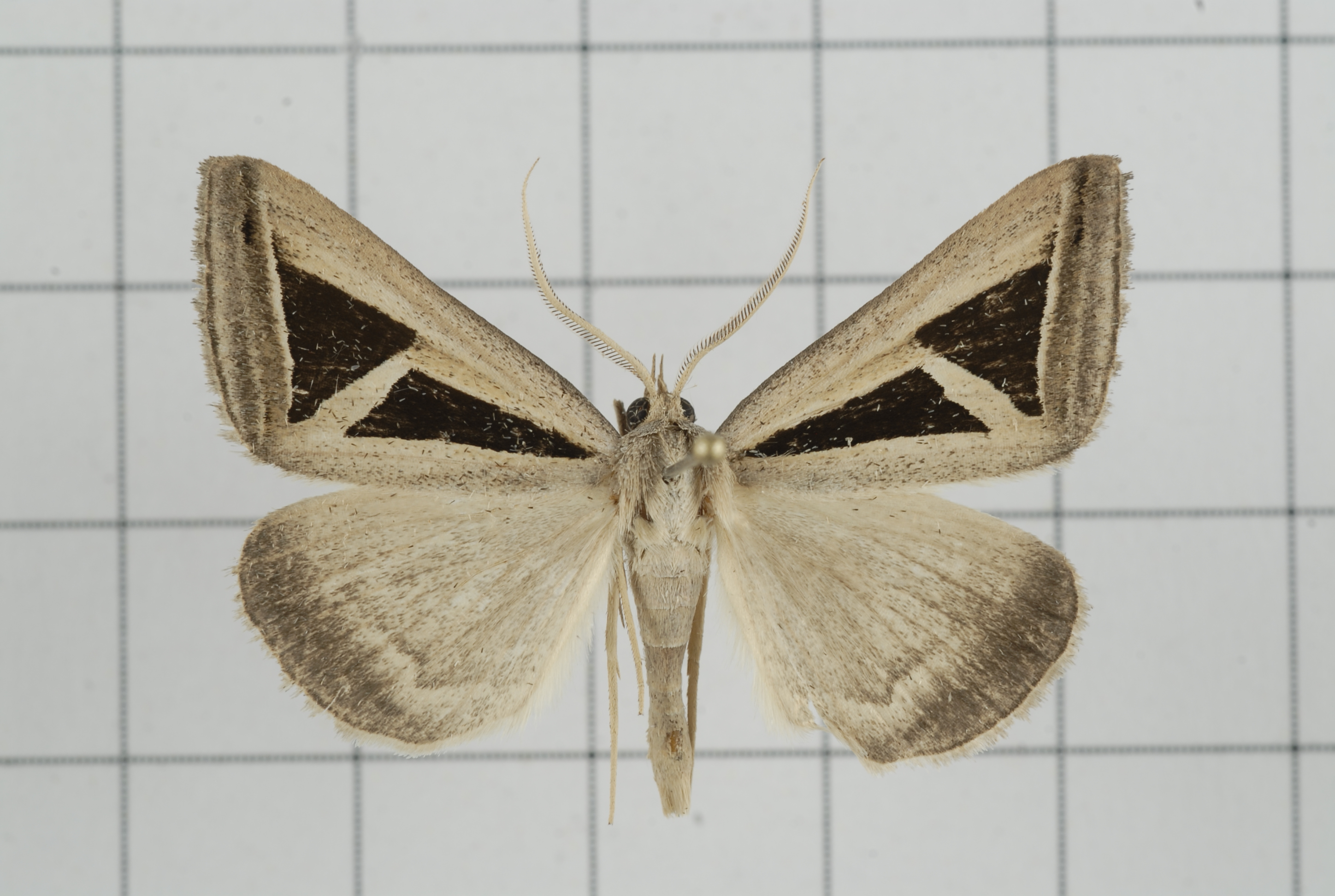

Melapia is a genus of moths of the family Noctuidae. The genus was erected by Shigero Sugi in 1968.

== Species ==
- Melapia japonica (Ogata, 1961)
- Melapia electaria (Bremer, 1864)
