= Euonychodes =

Scientific classification
- Domain: Eukaryota
- Kingdom: Animalia
- Phylum: Arthropoda
- Class: Insecta
- Order: Lepidoptera
- Superfamily: Noctuoidea
- Family: Noctuidae (?)
- Subfamily: Catocalinae
- Genus: Euonychodes; Warren, 1914
- Species: E. albivenata

Binomial name
- Euonychodes albivenata Warren, 1914

Genus of moths

Euonychodes is a monotypic moth genus of the family Noctuidae. Its only species, Euonychodes albivenata, is found in South Africa. Both the genus and species were first described by Warren in 1914.
