= Scodionyx =

Scientific classification
- Kingdom: Animalia
- Phylum: Arthropoda
- Class: Insecta
- Order: Lepidoptera
- Superfamily: Noctuoidea
- Family: Noctuidae (?)
- Subfamily: Catocalinae
- Genus: Scodionyx; Staudinger, 1900

Genus of moths

Scodionyx is a genus of moths of the family Noctuidae.

== Species ==
- Scodionyx mysticus Staudinger, 1900
