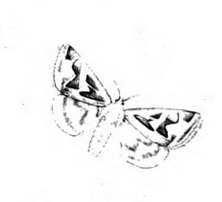

Scientific classification
- Kingdom: Animalia
- Phylum: Arthropoda
- Clade: Pancrustacea
- Class: Insecta
- Order: Lepidoptera
- Superfamily: Noctuoidea
- Family: Erebidae
- Genus: Callistege
- Species: C. fortalitium

Binomial name
- Callistege fortalitium (Walker, 1865)

Synonyms
- Noctua fortalitium Tauscher, 1809; Caenurgia fortalitium; Callistege fortalitium

= Callistege fortalitium =

Species of moth

Callistege fortalitium is a species of moth of the family Erebidae. It is found in southern Russia (Ural, Altai, Tuva, Siberia), Kazakhstan, Dagestan, Armenia, China and Mongolia.
