= Chamyna =

Scientific classification
- Kingdom: Animalia
- Phylum: Arthropoda
- Clade: Pancrustacea
- Class: Insecta
- Order: Lepidoptera
- Superfamily: Noctuoidea
- Family: Erebidae
- Subfamily: Calpinae
- Genus: Chamyna; Hübner, [1821]

Synonyms
- Chamina Hübner, 1823; Varia Walker, 1867; Sipatosia Hampson, 1926

Genus of moths

Chamyna is a genus of moths of the family Erebidae. The genus was erected by Jacob Hübner in 1821.

Lepidoptera and Some Other Life Forms also gives Varia as a species group of Calliteara Butler, 1881.

== Species ==
- Chamyna homalogramma Hampson, 1926
- Chamyna homichlodes Hübner, 1806
- Chamyna lamponia H. Druce, 1890
- Chamyna modesta Schaus, 1912
