= Perasia =

Scientific classification
- Kingdom: Animalia
- Phylum: Arthropoda
- Clade: Pancrustacea
- Class: Insecta
- Order: Lepidoptera
- Superfamily: Noctuoidea
- Family: Noctuidae (?)
- Subfamily: Catocalinae
- Genus: Perasia; Hübner, 1823

Synonyms
- Nymbis Guenée, 1852; Phurys Guenée, 1852

Genus of moths

Perasia is a genus of moths of the family Noctuidae erected by Jacob Hübner in 1823.

== Species ==
- Perasia helvina (Guenée, 1852)
