= Discosema =

Scientific classification
- Kingdom: Animalia
- Phylum: Arthropoda
- Class: Insecta
- Order: Lepidoptera
- Superfamily: Noctuoidea
- Family: Noctuidae
- Genus: Discosema

Genus of moths

Discosema is a genus of moths of the family Noctuidae. It contains a single species, D. birenosa (Felder, 1874), occurring in the Guianas (GBIF).
