= Nymbis =

Scientific classification
- Kingdom: Animalia
- Phylum: Arthropoda
- Class: Insecta
- Order: Lepidoptera
- Superfamily: Noctuoidea
- Family: Noctuidae (?)
- Subfamily: Catocalinae
- Genus: Nymbis; Guenée, 1852

Genus of moths

Nymbis is a genus of moths of the family Noctuidae.

== Species ==
- Nymbis aequa Draudt, 1940
- Nymbis fuscilineata Kaye, 1901
- Nymbis iniqua Guenée, 1852 (syn: Nymbis basilinea (Walker, 1869), Nymbis coactilis (Felder and Rogenhofer, 1874), Nymbis optabilis (Walker, 1858), Nymbis textilis (Guenée, 1852))
- Nymbis prolixa (Felder and Rogenhofer, 1874)
- Nymbis succrassata Dyar, 1921
