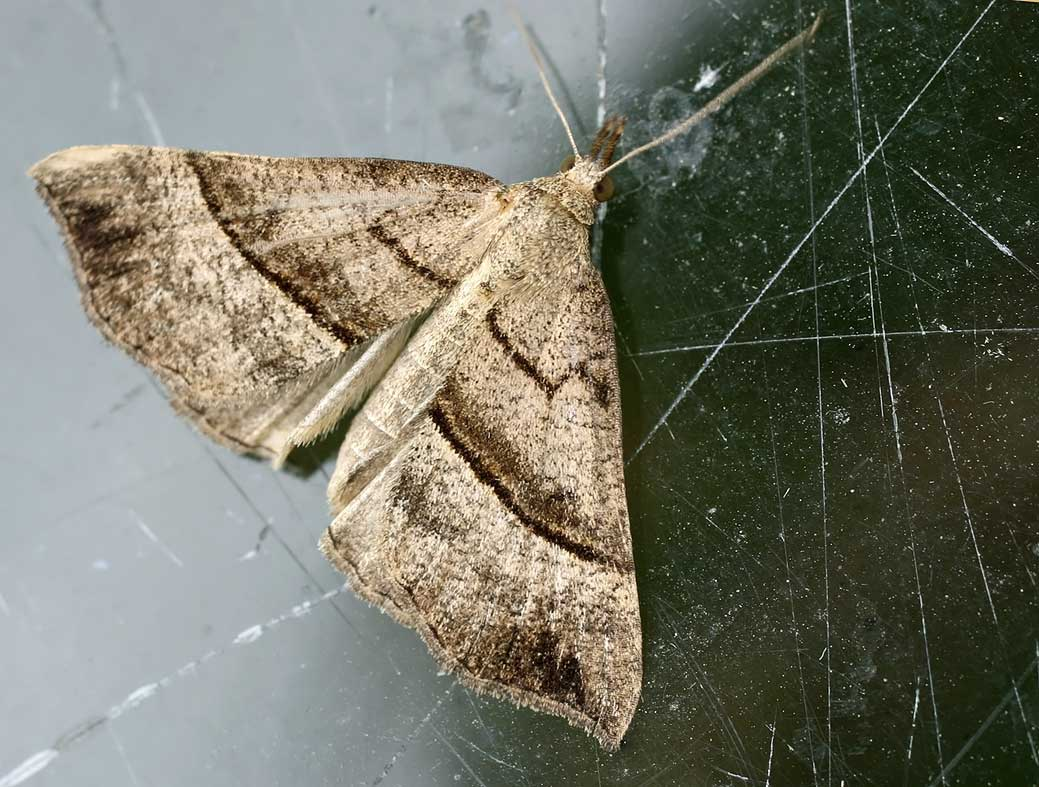
- The snout, Hypena proboscidalis

Scientific classification
- Kingdom: Animalia
- Phylum: Arthropoda
- Clade: Pancrustacea
- Class: Insecta
- Order: Lepidoptera
- Superfamily: Noctuoidea
- Family: Erebidae
- Subfamily: Hypeninae; Herrich-Schäffer, [1851]

= Hypeninae =

Subfamily of moths

The Hypeninae are a subfamily of moths in the family Erebidae. The taxon was first described by Gottlieb August Wilhelm Herrich-Schäffer in 1851. A notable species is Mecistoptera griseifusa, which lives solely on tears it drinks with its proboscis.

== Taxonomy ==
The subfamily was previously classified in the family Noctuidae. Several genera that were previously classified in the subfamily have been moved to the Rivulinae and Boletobiinae subfamilies of Erebidae, leaving the Hypeninae as a group of genera closely related to the type genus Hypena.

== Genera ==
- Aethalina
- Argania
- Arrade
- Artigisa
- Avirostrum
- Britha
- Calathusa
- Catada
- Catadoides
- Colobochyla
- Dichromia
- Elaphristis
- Epitripta
- Erna
- Esthlodora
- Foveades
- Goniocraspedon
- Goniophylla
- Harita
- Hepatica
- Hypena
- Hypenarana
- Hypertrocta
- Lophotoma
- Lysimelia
- Mecistoptera
- Meyrickella
- Naarda
- Panilla
- Paonidia
- Parilyrgis
- Paurophylla
- Pherechoa
- Philogethes
- Prionopterina
- Rhodina
- Rhynchina
- Rhynchodontodes
- Sandava
- Sarobela
- Stenopaltis
- Synolulis
- Tigrana
