= Folka =

Folka may refer to:

- Folka (moth), a genus of moths also known as Hepatica
- Folka, a common name for Folnegovićevo naselje, a part of Zagreb, Croatia
