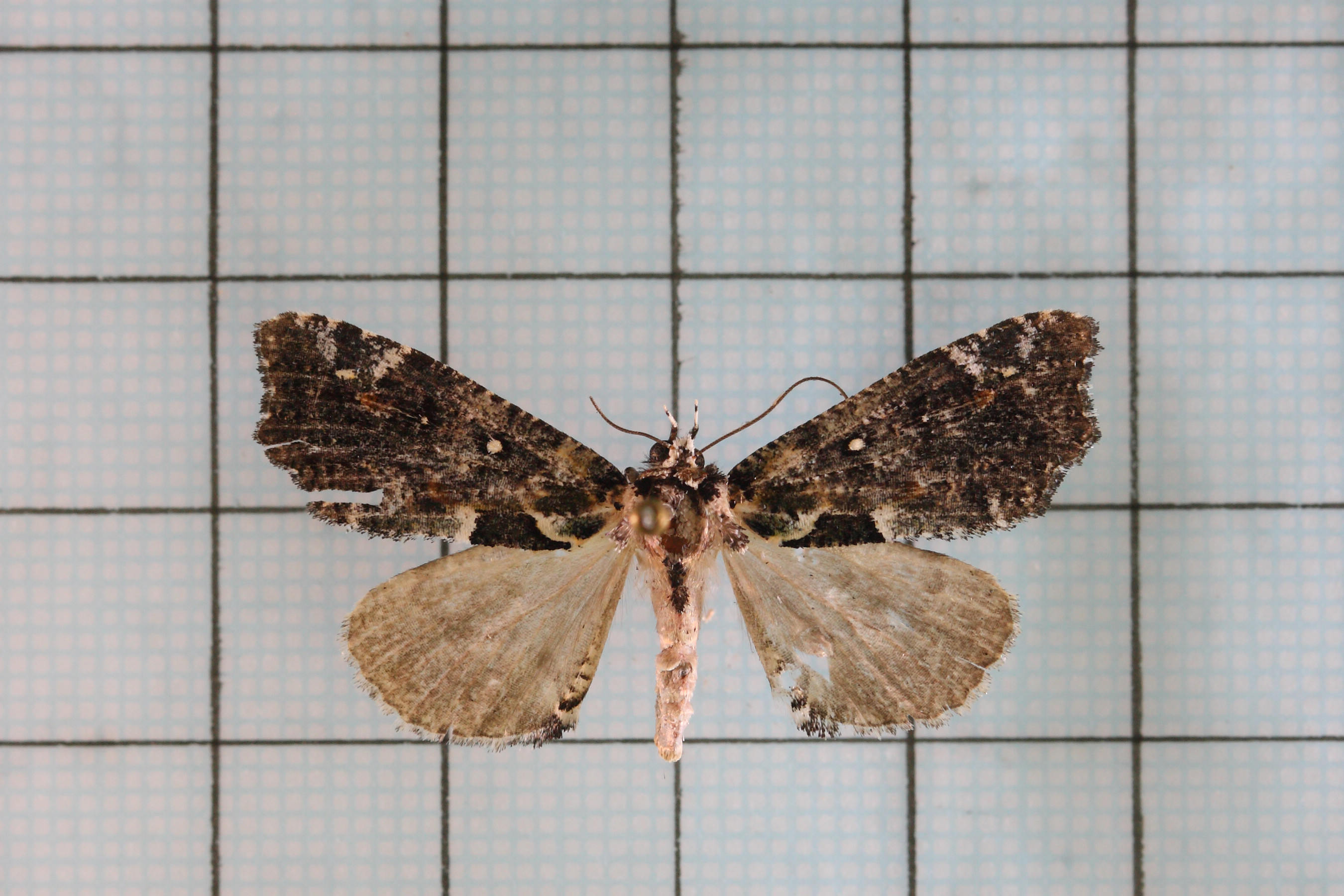
- Perciana marmorea

Scientific classification
- Kingdom: Animalia
- Phylum: Arthropoda
- Class: Insecta
- Order: Lepidoptera
- Superfamily: Noctuoidea
- Family: Erebidae
- Subfamily: Hypeninae
- Genus: Perciana; Walker, 1865

= Perciana =

Genus of moths

Perciana is a genus of moths of the family Noctuidae.

== Species ==
- Perciana dentata (Hampson, 1894)
- Perciana flavifusa Hampson, 1894
- Perciana fuscobrunnea Hampson, 1895
- Perciana marmorea Walker, 1865
- Perciana meeki Bethune-Baker, 1906
- Perciana rectilineata Hampson, 1896
- Perciana taiwana Wileman, 1911
