= Argan (disambiguation) =

Argan (Argania spinosa) is a tree of North Africa.

Argan may also refer to:

- Argan oil, produced from the tree above
- Argania (moth), a genus of moths of the family Erebidae
- Argan (grape), another name for the European wine grape Argant
- Argan, the protagonist of Le Malade imaginaire
- Giulio Carlo Argan (1909–1992), Italian art historian and politician
- The Sasanian city Arrajan
