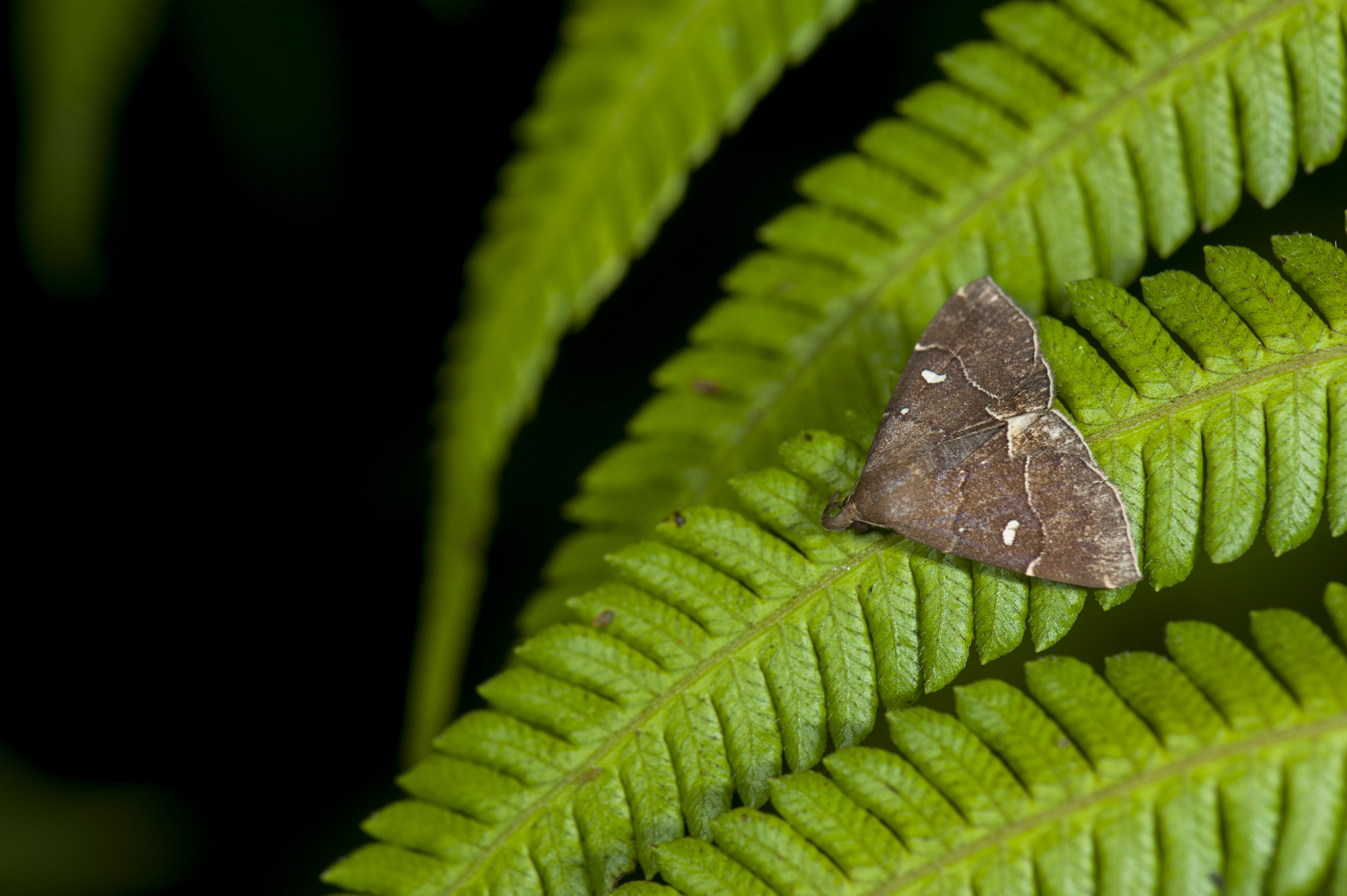
- Cidariplura shanmeii

Scientific classification
- Domain: Eukaryota
- Kingdom: Animalia
- Phylum: Arthropoda
- Class: Insecta
- Order: Lepidoptera
- Superfamily: Noctuoidea
- Family: Erebidae
- Subfamily: Hypeninae
- Genus: Cidariplura; Butler, 1879

= Cidariplura =

Genus of moths

Cidariplura is a genus of moths of the family Erebidae. The genus was erected by Arthur Gardiner Butler in 1879.

== Species ==
- Cidariplura albolineata (Bethune-Baker, 1908) New Guinea
- Cidariplura atayal Wu et al., 2013 Taiwan
- Cidariplura brevivittalis (Moore, 1867) Bengal, Japan, Taiwan
- Cidariplura butleri (Leech, 1900)
- Cidariplura chalybealis (Moore, 1867) Darjeeling
- Cidariplura dinawa (Bethune-Baker, 1908) New Guinea
- Cidariplura dubia (Butler, 1889) Dharmsala
- Cidariplura gladiata Butler, 1879 Japan, Korea, China, Taiwan
- Cidariplura ilana Wu et al., 2013 Taiwan
- Cidariplura maraho Wu et al., 2013 Taiwan
- Cidariplura modesta (Leech, 1900) western China
- Cidariplura nigristigma (Leech, 1900) Sichuan
- Cidariplura ochreistigma (Leech, 1900)
- Cidariplura olivens (Bethune-Baker, 1908) New Guinea
- Cidariplura perfusca (Swinhoe, 1895) Malaysia
- Cidariplura shanmeii Wu et al., 2013 Taiwan
- Cidariplura signata (Butler, 1876) Japan, Korea, China
