= Stenopaltis =

Scientific classification
- Domain: Eukaryota
- Kingdom: Animalia
- Phylum: Arthropoda
- Class: Insecta
- Order: Lepidoptera
- Superfamily: Noctuoidea
- Family: Erebidae
- Subfamily: Hypeninae
- Genus: Stenopaltis; C. Swinhoe, 1901
- Species: S. lithina

Binomial name
- Stenopaltis lithina C. Swinhoe, 1901

Genus of moths

Stenopaltis is a monotypic moth genus of the family Erebidae. Its only species, Stenopaltis lithina, is known from the Australian state of Queensland. Both the genus and the species were first described by Charles Swinhoe in 1901.
