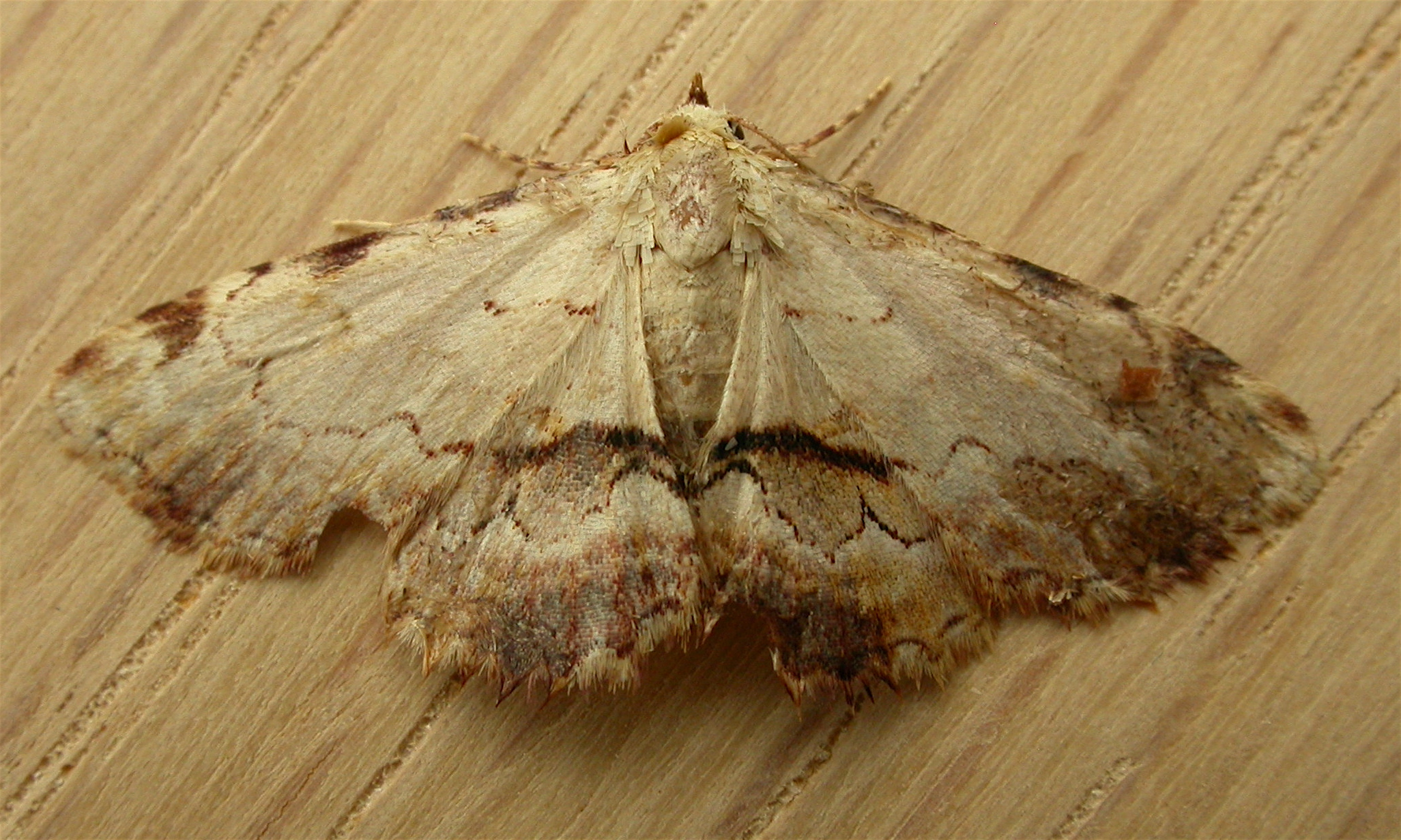

Scientific classification
- Kingdom: Animalia
- Phylum: Arthropoda
- Clade: Pancrustacea
- Class: Insecta
- Order: Lepidoptera
- Superfamily: Noctuoidea
- Family: Erebidae
- Genus: Sandava
- Species: S. xylistis

Binomial name
- Sandava xylistis C. Swinhoe, 1900

Synonyms
- Istarva xylistis

= Sandava xylistis =

Species of moth

Sandava xylistis, the rusty snout, is a moth of the family Erebidae first described by Charles Swinhoe in 1900. It is found in the Australian states of Victoria and Queensland, New South Wales, Tasmania, South Australia and the Australian Capital Territory.

The wingspan is about 20 mm. The moth flies in October, November, March and April.
