= Britha =

Scientific classification
- Kingdom: Animalia
- Phylum: Arthropoda
- Class: Insecta
- Order: Lepidoptera
- Superfamily: Noctuoidea
- Family: Erebidae
- Subfamily: Hypeninae
- Genus: Britha; Walker, [1866]

Synonyms
- Hyposemeia Hampson, 1893; Gravodos Rothschild, 1920

Genus of moths

Britha is a genus of moths of the family Erebidae first described by Francis Walker in 1866.

== Description ==
Palpi long and obliquely porrect (extending forward), where the second and third joints fringed with very long hair above. Antennae bipectinate (comb like on both sides) in male, with long spines from end of branches. Abdomen with dorsal tufts on the first two segments. Forewings of male with a large smooth patch occupying the inner area on underside, with a tuft of long hairs on vein 1. Hindwings with much arched costa and a large smooth patch on upperside. Veins 3, 4 and 6, 7 stalked. Vein 5 from near lower angle of cell.

== Species ==
In alphabetical order:

- Britha biguttata Walker, [1866]
- Britha bilineata (Wileman, 1915)
- Britha brithodes Fletcher, 1961
- Britha inambitiosa (Leech, 1900)
- Britha luzonica (Wileman & West, 1930)
- Britha pactalis (Walker, [1859])
- Britha robinsoni (Rothschild, 1920)
