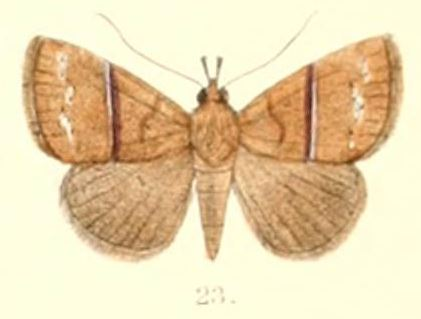
- Harita rectilinea

Scientific classification
- Domain: Eukaryota
- Kingdom: Animalia
- Phylum: Arthropoda
- Class: Insecta
- Order: Lepidoptera
- Superfamily: Noctuoidea
- Family: Erebidae
- Subfamily: Hypeninae
- Genus: Harita; Moore, 1882

Synonyms
- Placerobela Turner, 1903

= Harita (moth) =

Genus of moths

Harita is a genus of moths of the family Erebidae. The genus was erected by Frederic Moore in 1882.

== Species ==
- Harita belinda (Butler, 1879) Japan
- Harita brachyphylla (Turner, 1903) Queensland
- Harita irregularis Holloway, 1979 New Caledonia
- Harita nebulosa Moore, 1881) Darjeeling
- Harita nodyna (Bethune-Baker, 1908) New Guinea
- Harita rectilinea Moore, 1882 Khasi Hills, Sri Lanka, Myanmar, Peninsular Malaysia, Sumatra, Borneo
