= Avirostrum =

Scientific classification
- Domain: Eukaryota
- Kingdom: Animalia
- Phylum: Arthropoda
- Class: Insecta
- Order: Lepidoptera
- Superfamily: Noctuoidea
- Family: Erebidae
- Subfamily: Hypeninae
- Genus: Avirostrum; Bethune-Baker, 1908

Genus of moths

Avirostrum is a genus of moths of the family Noctuidae.

== Species ==
- Avirostrum grisea
- Avirostrum lignaria
- Avirostrum ochraceum
- Avirostrum pallens
- Avirostrum pratti Bethune-Baker, 1908
