= Meyrickella ruptellus =

Scientific classification
- Kingdom: Animalia
- Phylum: Arthropoda
- Clade: Pancrustacea
- Class: Insecta
- Order: Lepidoptera
- Superfamily: Noctuoidea
- Family: Erebidae
- Genus: Meyrickella
- Species: M. ruptellus

Binomial name
- Meyrickella ruptellus Walker, 1863

Species of moth

Meyrickella ruptellus is a species of moth in the family Erebidae. It was described by Walker in 1863. It is found in Australia.
