= Erna cara =

Scientific classification
- Kingdom: Animalia
- Phylum: Arthropoda
- Clade: Pancrustacea
- Class: Insecta
- Order: Lepidoptera
- Superfamily: Noctuoidea
- Family: Erebidae
- Subfamily: Hypeninae
- Genus: Erna; Strand, 1915
- Species: E. cara

Binomial name
- Erna cara Strand, 1915

Species of moth

Erna cara is the only species in the monotypic moth genus Erna of the family Erebidae. It is known from Cameroon. Both the genus and the species were first described by Strand in 1915.
