= Paurophylla =

Scientific classification
- Domain: Eukaryota
- Kingdom: Animalia
- Phylum: Arthropoda
- Class: Insecta
- Order: Lepidoptera
- Superfamily: Noctuoidea
- Family: Erebidae
- Subfamily: Hypeninae
- Genus: Paurophylla; Turner, 1902

Genus of moths

Paurophylla is a genus of moths of the family Erebidae. The genus was described by Turner in 1902.

== Species ==
- Paurophylla aleuropasta Turner, 1902 Queensland
- Paurophylla bidentata (Wileman, 1915) Formosa
- Paurophylla prominens (Hampson, 1895) Sikkim
