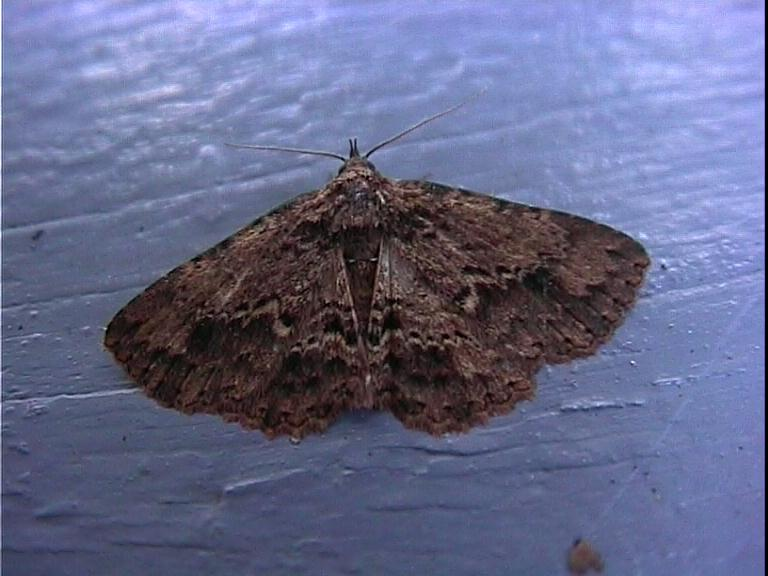
- Artigisa melanephele

Scientific classification
- Kingdom: Animalia
- Phylum: Arthropoda
- Class: Insecta
- Order: Lepidoptera
- Superfamily: Noctuoidea
- Family: Erebidae
- Subfamily: Hypeninae
- Genus: Artigisa; Walker, 1863

= Artigisa =

Genus of moths of the family Erebidae

Artigisa is a genus of moths of the family Erebidae, in which it is placed to subfamily Hypeninae, or alternatively, Erebinae. This genus was first described by Francis Walker in 1863.

== Species ==
There are six recognized species:

- Artigisa byrsopa Lower, 1903
- Artigisa dentilinea Turner, 1909
- Artigisa impropria Walker, 1865
- Artigisa lignicolaria Walker, 1866
- Artigisa melanephele Hampson, 1914
- Artigisa nigrosignata Walker, [1863]

The status of Catada acrospila Turner, 1906 is uncertain, with some placing it here as Artigisa acrospila (Turner, 1906).
