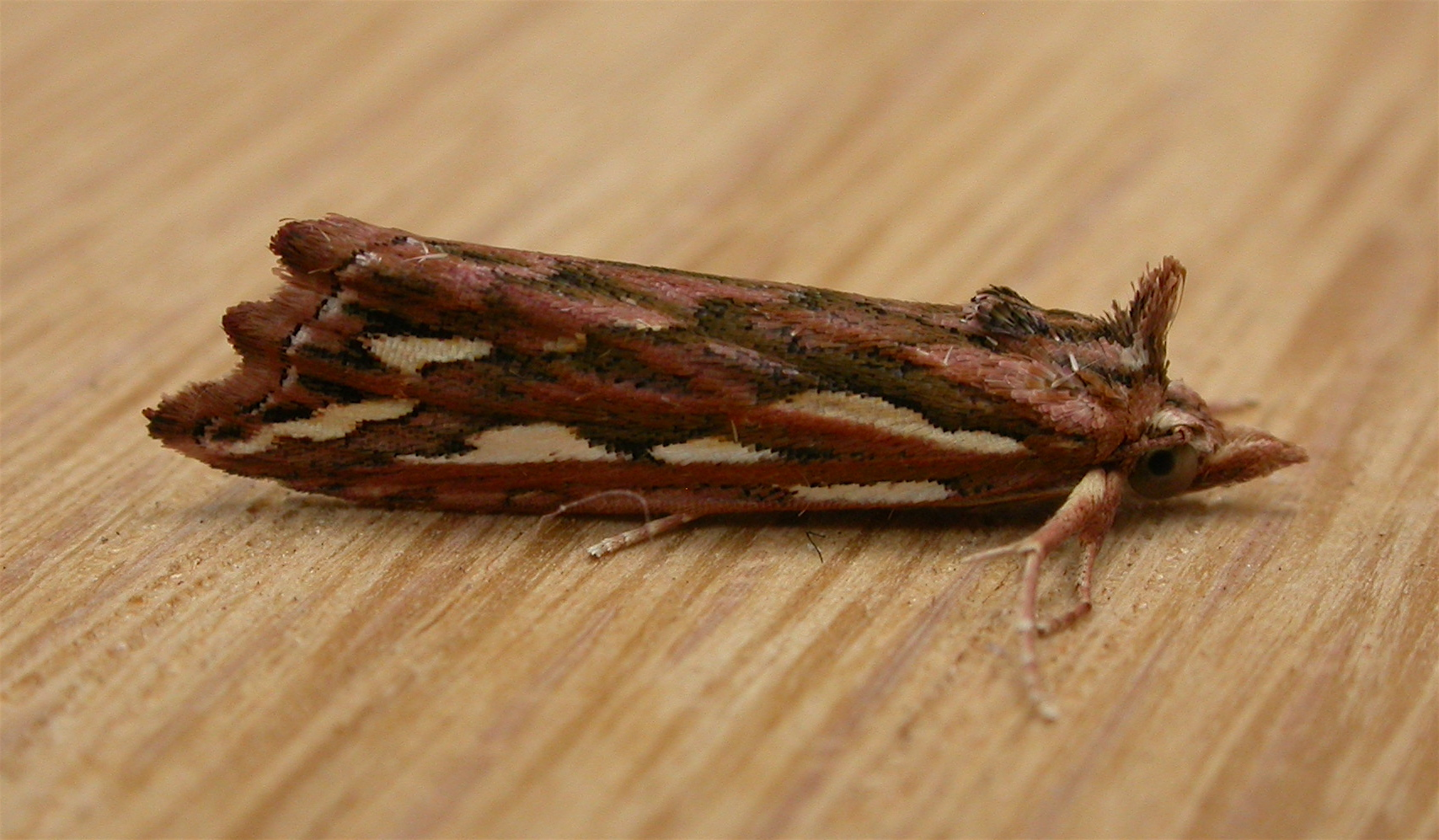

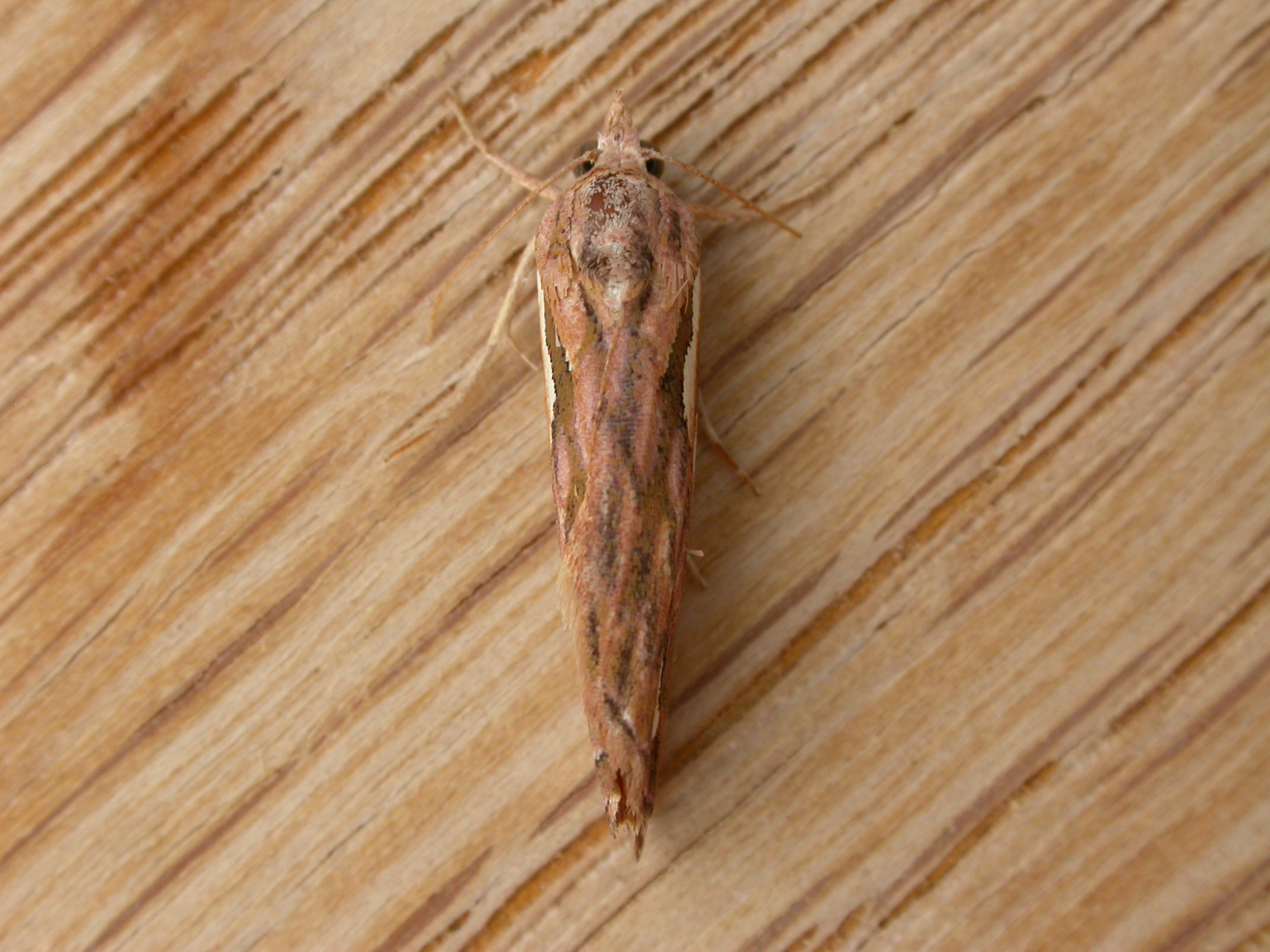

Scientific classification
- Domain: Eukaryota
- Kingdom: Animalia
- Phylum: Arthropoda
- Class: Insecta
- Order: Lepidoptera
- Superfamily: Noctuoidea
- Family: Erebidae
- Genus: Meyrickella
- Species: M. torquesauria

Binomial name
- Meyrickella torquesauria T. P. Lucas, 1892

Synonyms
- Prionophora torquesauria

= Meyrickella torquesauria =

Species of moth

Meyrickella torquesauria is a moth of the family Noctuidae first described by Thomas Pennington Lucas in 1892. It is found in Queensland and New South Wales, Australia.

The wingspan is about 20 mm.

The larvae feed on Callitris columellaris.
