= Philogethes =

Scientific classification
- Domain: Eukaryota
- Kingdom: Animalia
- Phylum: Arthropoda
- Class: Insecta
- Order: Lepidoptera
- Superfamily: Noctuoidea
- Family: Erebidae
- Subfamily: Hypeninae
- Genus: Philogethes; Turner, 1939
- Species: P. metableta

Binomial name
- Philogethes metableta Turner, 1939

Genus of moths

Philogethes is a monotypic moth genus of the family Erebidae. Its only species, Philogethes metableta, is known from the Australian state of Queensland. Both the genus and species were first described by Turner in 1939.
