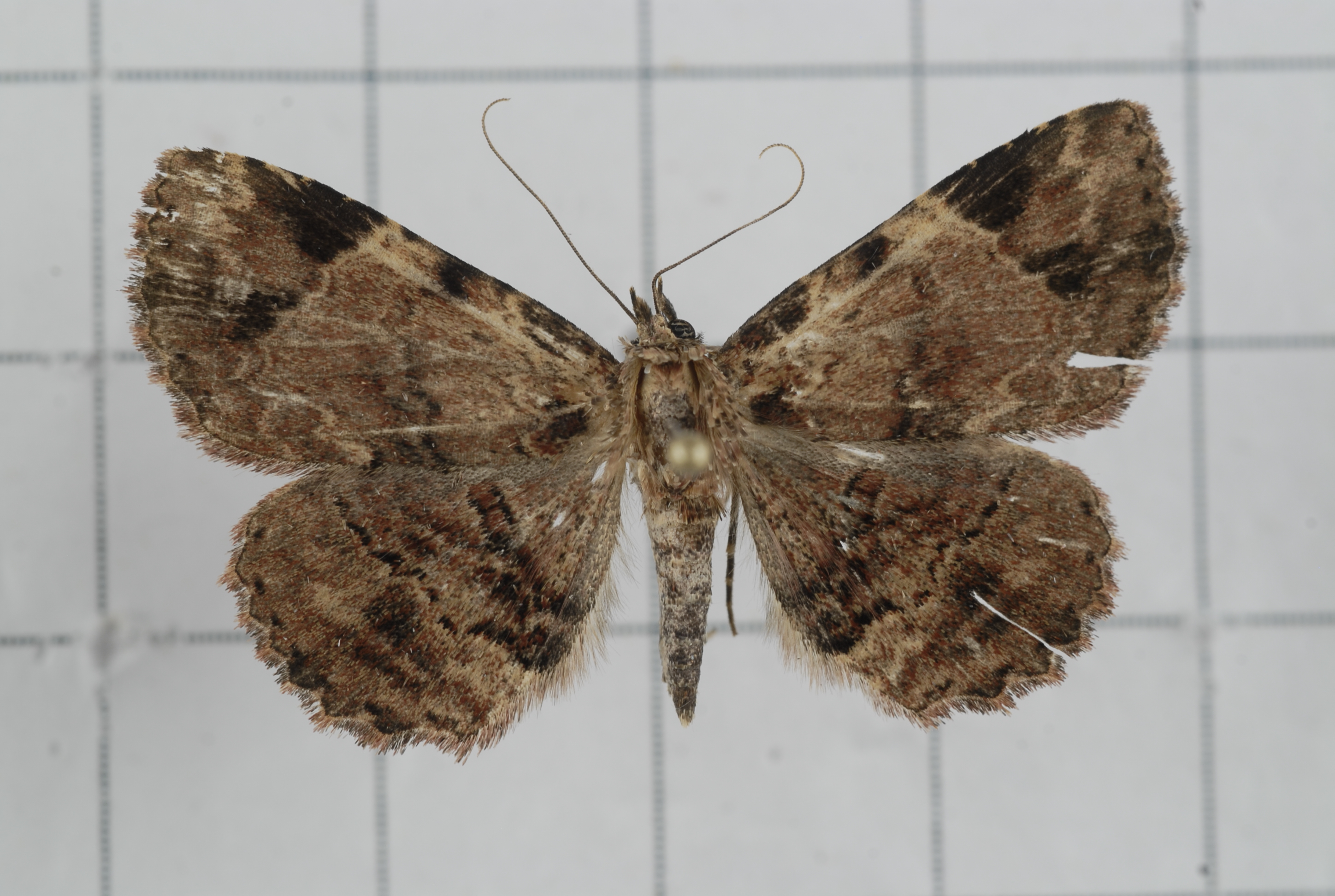

Scientific classification
- Kingdom: Animalia
- Phylum: Arthropoda
- Class: Insecta
- Order: Lepidoptera
- Superfamily: Noctuoidea
- Family: Erebidae
- Genus: Panilla
- Species: P. costipunctata

Binomial name
- Panilla costipunctata Leech, 1900

= Panilla costipunctata =

Species of moth

Panilla costipunctata is a moth of the family Erebidae. It is a species of the genus Panilla. It is known from Nepal, Guangdong, Taiwan and Japan.
