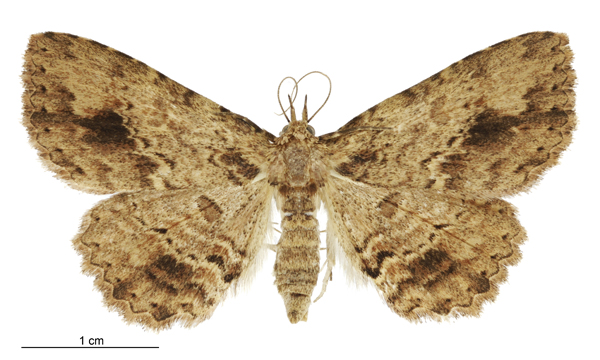
- Female
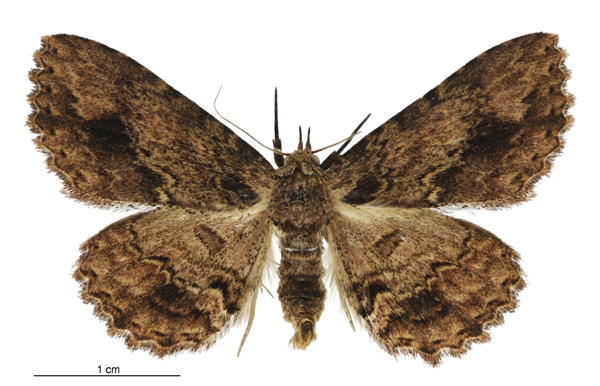
- Male

Scientific classification
- Kingdom: Animalia
- Phylum: Arthropoda
- Clade: Pancrustacea
- Class: Insecta
- Order: Lepidoptera
- Superfamily: Noctuoidea
- Family: Erebidae
- Genus: Artigisa
- Species: A. melanephele

Binomial name
- Artigisa melanephele Hampson, 1914

= Artigisa melanephele =

Species of moth

Artigisa melanephele is a moth of the family Erebidae first described by George Hampson in 1914. It is known from Australia and New Zealand.
