= Mecistoptera albisigna =

Scientific classification
- Kingdom: Animalia
- Phylum: Arthropoda
- Class: Insecta
- Order: Lepidoptera
- Superfamily: Noctuoidea
- Family: Erebidae
- Genus: Mecistoptera
- Species: M. albisigna

Binomial name
- Mecistoptera albisigna Hampson, 1912

Species of moth

Mecistoptera albisigna is a species of moth of the family Erebidae. It was described by George Hampson in 1912. It is found in southern India, Australia and on Fiji.

The wingspan is about 24 mm. The forewings are grey brown irrorated (sprinkled) with a few black scales and with traces of a strongly excurved antemedial line. The orbicular stigma is found near the end of the cell and is round and defined by black except below. There is a comet-shaped mark at the end of the cell, its upper extremity extending to near the costa and its lower to near the postmedial line above vein three, defined by black except above, with a white spot on its inner side on the discocellulars, a white line on its outer edge and some rufous in the centre, some black suffusion beyond it and a slight white streak above its upper extremity. The postmedial line is black, dentate and oblique from the costa near the apex to vein three, angled outwards at vein seven and inwards at the discal fold. There is a fuscous mark below vein two, as well as some white points on the costa towards the apex. The subterminal line is slight, grey defined on the inner side by black striae, excurved at the middle, and angled inwards at the discal and submedian folds. There is a fine waved black terminal line with an ochreous-white mark before it below vein three and a black-brown spot below vein two. The hindwings are fuscous brown.
