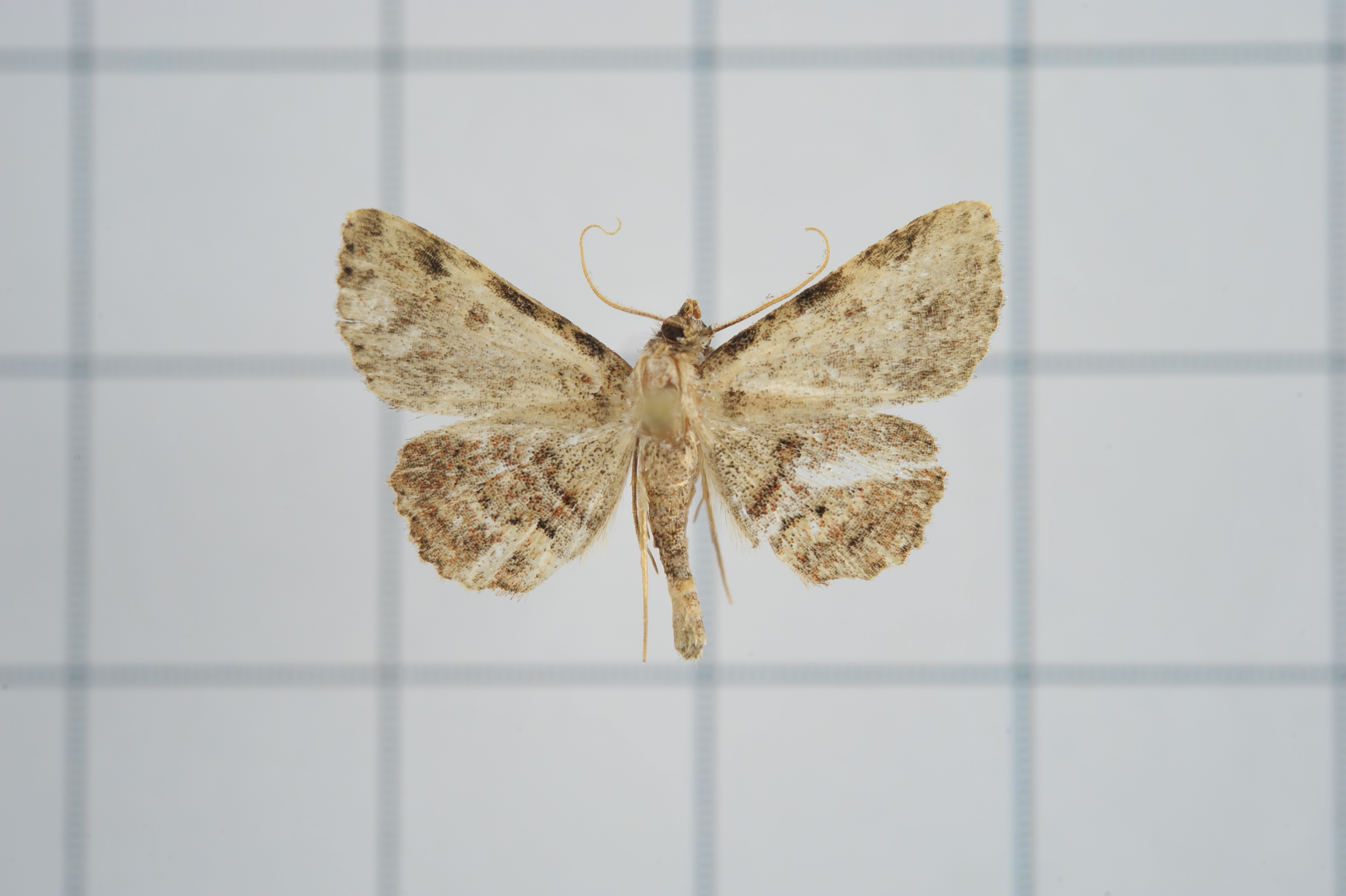

Scientific classification
- Kingdom: Animalia
- Phylum: Arthropoda
- Class: Insecta
- Order: Lepidoptera
- Superfamily: Noctuoidea
- Family: Erebidae
- Genus: Panilla
- Species: P. mila

Binomial name
- Panilla mila Strand, 1920

= Panilla mila =

Species of moth

Panilla mila is a moth of the family Erebidae. It is a species of the genus Panilla. It is known from Taiwan.
