= Panilla aroa =

Scientific classification
- Kingdom: Animalia
- Phylum: Arthropoda
- Class: Insecta
- Order: Lepidoptera
- Superfamily: Noctuoidea
- Family: Erebidae
- Genus: Panilla
- Species: P. aroa

Binomial name
- Panilla aroa Bethune-Baker, 1906

Synonyms
- Panilla umbrifera Turner, 1908

Species of moth

Panilla aroa is a moth of the family Erebidae. It is a species of the genus Panilla. It is known from New Guinea and Queensland (Australia).
