= Paonidia =

Scientific classification
- Kingdom: Animalia
- Phylum: Arthropoda
- Class: Insecta
- Order: Lepidoptera
- Superfamily: Noctuoidea
- Family: Erebidae
- Subfamily: Hypeninae
- Genus: Paonidia; Meyrick, 1902
- Species: P. anthracias

Binomial name
- Paonidia anthracias (Lower, 1897)

Synonyms
- Mesoptila anthracias Lower, 1897; Paonidia pentaptila Meyrick, 1902; Panilla cautophanes Turner, 1902; Artigisa microsticta Turner, 1939

Genus of moths

Paonidia is a monotypic moth genus in the family Erebidae erected by Edward Meyrick in 1902. Its only species, Paonidia anthracias, was first described by Oswald Bertram Lower in 1897. It is found in New South Wales, Australia.
