= Elaphristis =

Scientific classification
- Kingdom: Animalia
- Phylum: Arthropoda
- Class: Insecta
- Order: Lepidoptera
- Superfamily: Noctuoidea
- Family: Erebidae
- Subfamily: Hypeninae
- Genus: Elaphristis; Meyrick, 1891

Synonyms
- Zophochroa Turner, 1902

Genus of moths

Elaphristis is a genus of moths of the family Erebidae. The genus was erected by Edward Meyrick in 1891.

== Species ==
- Elaphristis aneliopa (Bethune-Baker, 1908)
- Elaphristis anthracia Meyrick, 1891
- Elaphristis anthracitis Turner, 1902
- Elaphristis leucochorda Turner, 1902
- Elaphristis melanica Turner, 1902
- Elaphristis psoloessa Turner, 1909
