= Panilla nigrinotata =

Scientific classification
- Kingdom: Animalia
- Phylum: Arthropoda
- Class: Insecta
- Order: Lepidoptera
- Superfamily: Noctuoidea
- Family: Erebidae
- Genus: Panilla
- Species: P. nigrinotata

Binomial name
- Panilla nigrinotata (Hampson, 1926)

Synonyms
- Corsa nigrinotata Hampson, 1926

Species of moth

Panilla nigrinotata is a moth of the family Erebidae. It is a species of the genus Panilla. It is known from the Philippines, Borneo and peninsular Malaysia. It has a wingspan of 18–22 mm.
