= Foveades =

Scientific classification
- Domain: Eukaryota
- Kingdom: Animalia
- Phylum: Arthropoda
- Class: Insecta
- Order: Lepidoptera
- Superfamily: Noctuoidea
- Family: Erebidae
- Subfamily: Hypeninae
- Genus: Foveades; Bethune-Baker, 1908

Synonyms
- Anomophlebia Turner, 1908; Pachygnathesis Hampson, 1918

Genus of moths

Foveades is a genus of moths of the family Erebidae. The genus was erected by George Thomas Bethune-Baker in 1908.

== Species ==
- Foveades aroensis Bethune-Baker, 1908 New Guinea, Queensland
- Foveades bisectalis (Wileman, 1915) Formosa
- Foveades squamata (Hampson, 1918) Louisiade Archipelago
