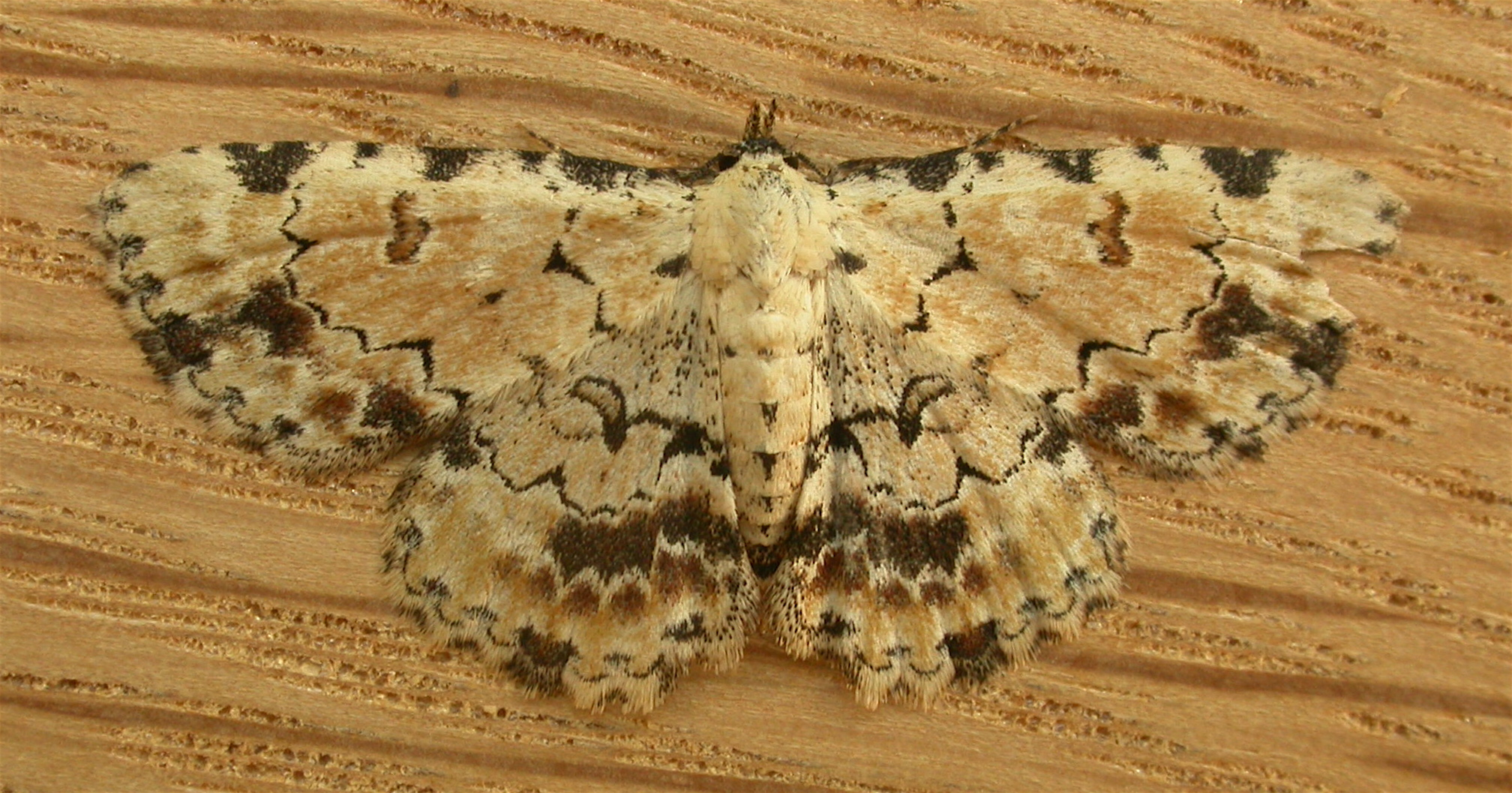
- Sandava scitisignata

Scientific classification
- Kingdom: Animalia
- Phylum: Arthropoda
- Class: Insecta
- Order: Lepidoptera
- Superfamily: Noctuoidea
- Family: Erebidae
- Subfamily: Hypeninae
- Genus: Sandava; Walker, [1863]

Synonyms
- Istarba Walker, [1866]; Sandasa Kaye, 1901 (misspelling); Istarva Lower, 1895 (misspelling); Pectinidia Holloway, 1977

= Sandava =

Genus of moths

Sandava is a genus of moths of the family Erebidae. The genus was erected by Francis Walker in 1863.

== Species ==
- Sandava micrastigma (Kaye, 1901) Trinidad
- Sandava scitisignata (Walker, 1862) Queensland
- Sandava silvicola (Holloway, 1977) Norfolk Island
- Sandava xylistis C. Swinhoe, 1900 Australia
