= Artigisa nigrosignata =

Scientific classification
- Kingdom: Animalia
- Phylum: Arthropoda
- Class: Insecta
- Order: Lepidoptera
- Superfamily: Noctuoidea
- Family: Erebidae
- Genus: Artigisa
- Species: A. nigrosignata

Binomial name
- Artigisa nigrosignata Walker, 1864

Synonyms
- Homoptera catenata Moore, 1887; Panilla apicalis Butler, 1889

Species of moth

Artigisa nigrosignata is a moth of the family Erebidae first described by Francis Walker in 1864. It is found in Sri Lanka, Borneo and India.

Its wings are straw colored with medium brown variegated stripes. There are fine wavy, black postmedials. There is an oblique, diffusely edged black bar at apex.
