= Tigrana =

Scientific classification
- Kingdom: Animalia
- Phylum: Arthropoda
- Class: Insecta
- Order: Lepidoptera
- Superfamily: Noctuoidea
- Family: Erebidae
- Subfamily: Hypeninae
- Genus: Tigrana; Walker, [1866]

Genus of moths

Tigrana is a genus of moths of the family Erebidae. The genus was erected by Francis Walker in 1866.

== Species ==
- Tigrana detritalis Walker, [1866]
- Tigrana fervidalis Walker, [1866]
