= Panilla homospila =

Scientific classification
- Kingdom: Animalia
- Phylum: Arthropoda
- Class: Insecta
- Order: Lepidoptera
- Superfamily: Noctuoidea
- Family: Erebidae
- Genus: Panilla
- Species: P. homospila

Binomial name
- Panilla homospila (Hampson, 1914)

Species of moth

Panilla homospila is a moth of the family Erebidae. It is a species of the genus Panilla. It is known from Borneo.
