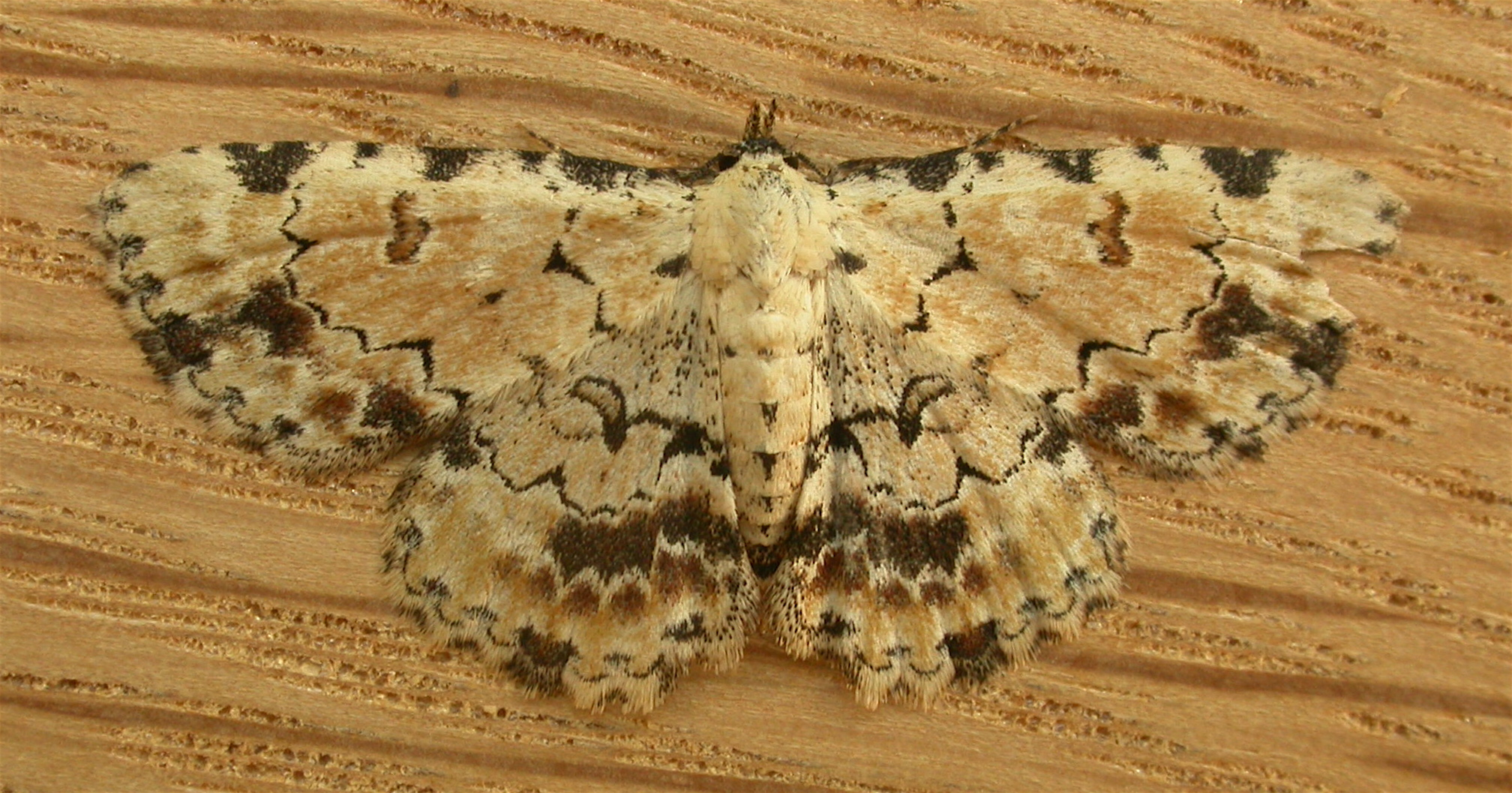

Scientific classification
- Kingdom: Animalia
- Phylum: Arthropoda
- Class: Insecta
- Order: Lepidoptera
- Superfamily: Noctuoidea
- Family: Erebidae
- Genus: Sandava
- Species: S. scitisignata

Binomial name
- Sandava scitisignata Walker, 1862

Synonyms
- Cidaria scitisignata Walker, 1862; Sandava melaleucata Walker, [1863]; Istarba varialis Walker, [1866]

= Sandava scitisignata =

Species of moth

Sandava scitisignata, the fungi snout, is a moth of the family Erebidae first described by Francis Walker in 1862. It is found in the southern half of Australia.

The wingspan is about 20 mm. The moth flies from September to April.

The larvae feed on fungi on dead trees.
