= Cidariplura ilana =

Scientific classification
- Domain: Eukaryota
- Kingdom: Animalia
- Phylum: Arthropoda
- Class: Insecta
- Order: Lepidoptera
- Superfamily: Noctuoidea
- Family: Erebidae
- Genus: Cidariplura
- Species: C. ilana

Binomial name
- Cidariplura ilana Wu et al., 2013

Species of moth

Cidariplura ilana is a species of moth in the family Noctuidae. It was first found in Taiwan, and is one of a handful of species from this genus found in the island.
