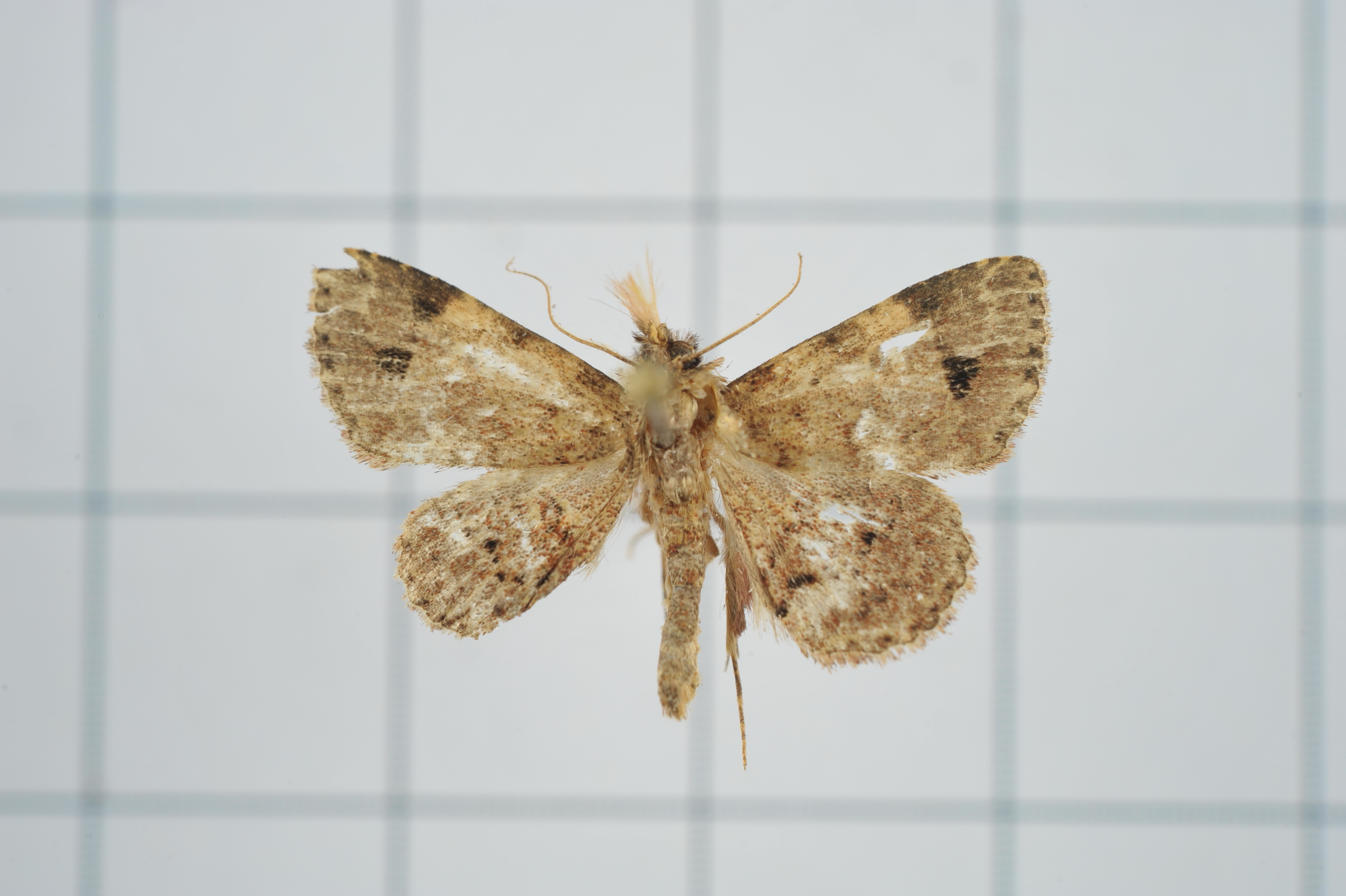

Scientific classification
- Kingdom: Animalia
- Phylum: Arthropoda
- Clade: Pancrustacea
- Class: Insecta
- Order: Lepidoptera
- Superfamily: Noctuoidea
- Family: Erebidae
- Genus: Panilla
- Species: P. dispila

Binomial name
- Panilla dispila (Walker, 1865)

Synonyms
- Homoptera dispila Walker, 1865

= Panilla dispila =

Species of moth

Panilla dispila is a moth of the family Noctuidae first described by Francis Walker in 1865. It is a species of the genus Panilla. It is found in Sri Lanka and Taiwan.
