= Esthlodora =

Scientific classification
- Domain: Eukaryota
- Kingdom: Animalia
- Phylum: Arthropoda
- Class: Insecta
- Order: Lepidoptera
- Superfamily: Noctuoidea
- Family: Erebidae
- Subfamily: Hypeninae
- Genus: Esthlodora; Turner, 1902

Genus of moths

Esthlodora is a genus of moths of the family Noctuidae.

== Species ==
- Esthlodora cyanospila Turner, 1908
- Esthlodora variabilis Swinhoe, 1901
- Esthlodora versicolor Turner, 1902
