= Goniophylla =

Scientific classification
- Domain: Eukaryota
- Kingdom: Animalia
- Phylum: Arthropoda
- Class: Insecta
- Order: Lepidoptera
- Superfamily: Noctuoidea
- Family: Erebidae
- Subfamily: Hypeninae
- Genus: Goniophylla; Turner, 1945
- Species: G. fragilis

Binomial name
- Goniophylla fragilis Turner, 1945

Genus of moths

Goniophylla is a monotypic moth genus of the family Erebidae. Its only species, Goniophylla fragilis, is known from the Australian state of Queensland. Both the genus and species were first described by Turner in 1945.
