= Catadoides =

Scientific classification
- Domain: Eukaryota
- Kingdom: Animalia
- Phylum: Arthropoda
- Class: Insecta
- Order: Lepidoptera
- Superfamily: Noctuoidea
- Family: Erebidae
- Subfamily: Hypeninae
- Genus: Catadoides; Bethune-Baker, 1908

Genus of moths

Catadoides is a genus of moths in the family Erebidae. The genus was erected by George Thomas Bethune-Baker in 1908.

== Species ==
- Catadoides fijiensis Robinson, 1975 Fiji
- Catadoides longipalpis (Swinhoe, 1903) Peninsular Malaysia, Borneo, Java
- Catadoides punctata Bethune-Baker, 1908 New Guinea, Seram
- Catadoides russula Holloway, 2008 Borneo
- Catadoides vunindawa Robinson, 1875 Fiji
