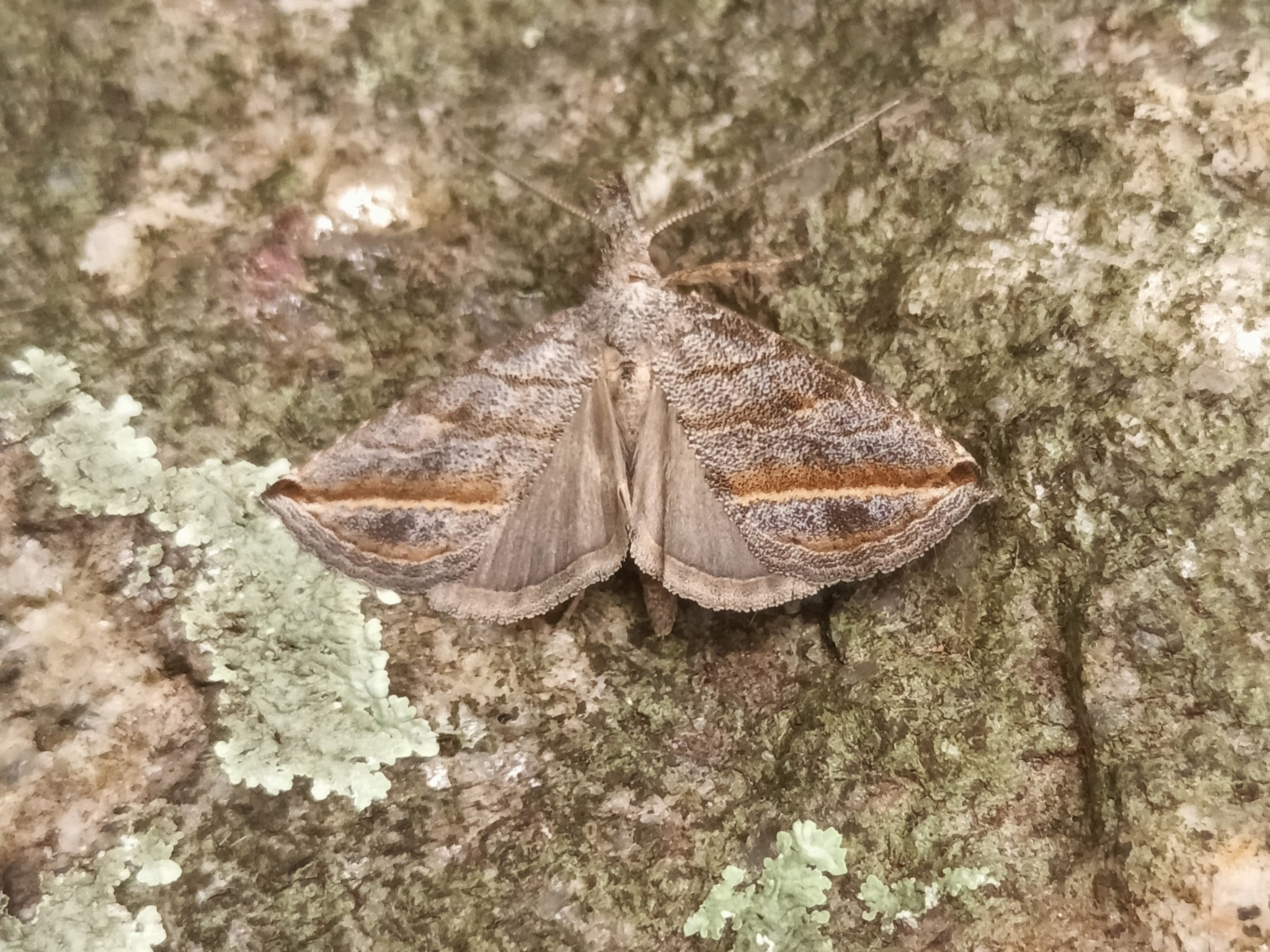

Scientific classification
- Kingdom: Animalia
- Phylum: Arthropoda
- Class: Insecta
- Order: Lepidoptera
- Superfamily: Noctuoidea
- Family: Erebidae
- Genus: Britha
- Species: B. biguttata

Binomial name
- Britha biguttata Walker, 1866

Synonyms
- Herminia? incertalis Walker, [1866]; Hypena colabalis Felder & Rogenhofer, 1874; Rhynchina ides Bethune-Baker, 1908

= Britha biguttata =

Species of moth

Britha biguttata is a moth of the family Erebidae first described by Francis Walker in 1866. It is found in India, Sri Lanka, Java, New Guinea, Bismarck Islands, Sulawesi, Java, Borneo, Myanmar, Taiwan and Australia.

The wings are brownish with variegated markings. Labial palpi are covered densely with spiky hairs.
