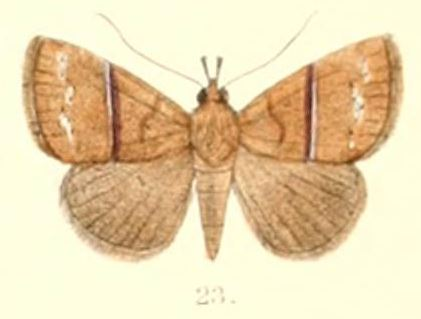

Scientific classification
- Domain: Eukaryota
- Kingdom: Animalia
- Phylum: Arthropoda
- Class: Insecta
- Order: Lepidoptera
- Superfamily: Noctuoidea
- Family: Erebidae
- Genus: Harita
- Species: H. rectilinea

Binomial name
- Harita rectilinea Moore, 1882

Synonyms
- Hypena ferrealis Hampson, 1893

= Harita rectilinea =

Species of moth

Harita rectilinea is a moth of the family Noctuidae described by Frederic Moore in 1882. It is found in India (Khasi Hills), Sri Lanka, Myanmar, Peninsular Malaysia and on Sumatra and Borneo.

== Description ==
Its wingspan is about 32 mm. Palpi with the third joint longer than the second joint, obliquely porrect (extending forward) and thickly clothed with scales. Antennae of male serrate (like saw teeth) and fasciculate (bundled). Body red greyish brown. Palpi black. Forewings slightly sprinkled with dark specks. There is an indistinct sinuous antemedial line and a black speck in cell. A medial straight, almost erect, dark line with some bluish grey on the outer edge, and often with the area beyond it grey. Costa of forewings have white specks on towards apex. A more or less developed sinuous submarginal black and white specks series present. Hindwings fuscous. Ventral side with sub-apical black and white speck to forewing, and indistinct cell spot and postmedial line to hindwing. The males have the palpi shorter, more broadly scaled, and the frontal tuft very thick.

The larvae feed on Combretum species.
