= Sarobela =

Scientific classification
- Domain: Eukaryota
- Kingdom: Animalia
- Phylum: Arthropoda
- Class: Insecta
- Order: Lepidoptera
- Superfamily: Noctuoidea
- Family: Erebidae
- Subfamily: Hypeninae
- Genus: Sarobela; Turner, 1936
- Species: S. litterata

Binomial name
- Sarobela litterata (Pagenstecher, 1888)

Synonyms
- Plusia litterata Pagenstecher, 1888; Hypena biplagiata Butler, 1889; Athyrma aurotincta Hampson, 1893; Sarobela spectabilis Turner, 1936

Genus of moths

Sarobela is a monotypic moth genus of the family Erebidae described by Turner in 1936. Its only species, Sarobela litterata, was first described by Pagenstecher in 1888. It is found in Sri Lanka, Hong Kong, the Philippines, Taiwan, Myanmar, the Andaman Islands, Sumatra, Sulawesi, New Guinea, Borneo and Australia.

The adult's wingspan is 3 cm. Its forewings are greyish brown with two large black patches based on the costa. Hindwings plain brown. Forwardly projected long labial palpi.
