= Aethalina =

Scientific classification
- Domain: Eukaryota
- Kingdom: Animalia
- Phylum: Arthropoda
- Class: Insecta
- Order: Lepidoptera
- Superfamily: Noctuoidea
- Family: Erebidae
- Subfamily: Hypeninae
- Genus: Aethalina; Turner, 1902
- Species: A. asaphes

Binomial name
- Aethalina asaphes Turner, 1902

Genus of moths

Aethalina is a monotypic moth genus in the family Erebidae. Its only species, Aethalina asaphes, is found in Queensland, Australia. Both the genus and species were first described by Turner in 1902.

== Former species ==
- Aethalina plumosa Wileman & West, 1930 now Feathalina plumosa (Wileman & West, 1930)
