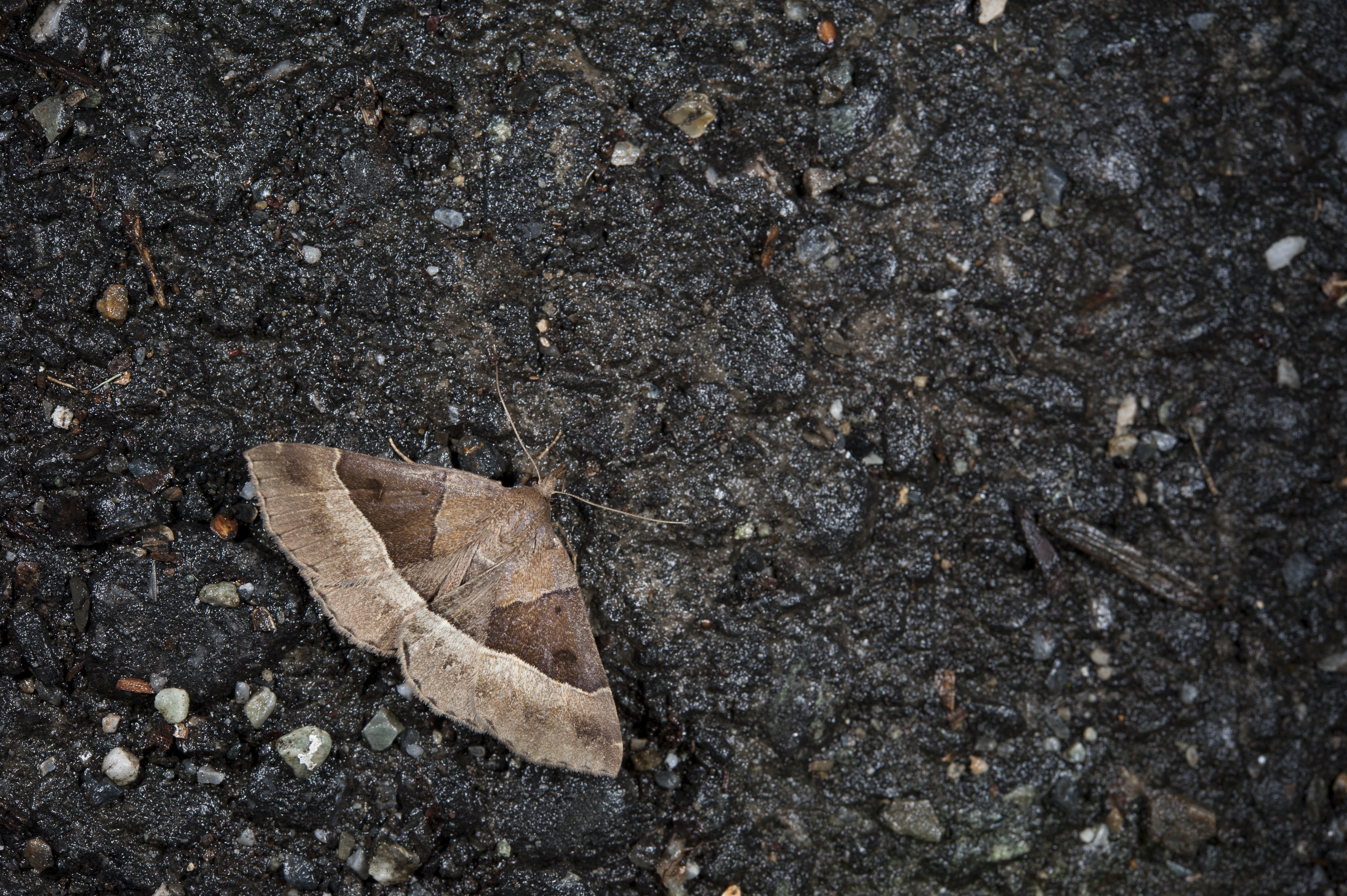
- Cidariplura maraho

Scientific classification
- Domain: Eukaryota
- Kingdom: Animalia
- Phylum: Arthropoda
- Class: Insecta
- Order: Lepidoptera
- Superfamily: Noctuoidea
- Family: Erebidae
- Genus: Cidariplura
- Species: C. maraho

Binomial name
- Cidariplura maraho Wu et al., 2013

= Cidariplura maraho =

Species of moth

Cidariplura maraho is a species of moth in the family Noctuidae. It was first found in Taiwan, and is one of a handful of species from this genus found in the island.
