= Panilla minima =

Scientific classification
- Kingdom: Animalia
- Phylum: Arthropoda
- Class: Insecta
- Order: Lepidoptera
- Superfamily: Noctuoidea
- Family: Erebidae
- Genus: Panilla
- Species: P. minima

Binomial name
- Panilla minima (Butler, 1887)

Synonyms
- Epizeuxis minima Butler, 1887; Panilla minima diplodonta Fletcher, 1957; Panilla minima oxyprora Fletcher, 1957

Species of moth

Panilla minima is a moth of the family Erebidae. It is a species of the genus Panilla. It is known from the Solomon Islands.
