= Hypertrocta =

Scientific classification
- Kingdom: Animalia
- Phylum: Arthropoda
- Class: Insecta
- Order: Lepidoptera
- Superfamily: Noctuoidea
- Family: Erebidae
- Subfamily: Hypeninae
- Genus: Hypertrocta; Hampson, 1893

Synonyms
- Moscha Walker, [1866]; Camptocrossa Turner, 1944

Genus of moths

Hypertrocta is a genus of moths of the family Erebidae. The genus was erected by George Hampson in 1893.

== Species ==
- Hypertrocta brunnea Bethune-Baker, 1908
- Hypertrocta posticalis Walker, [1866]
