= Lophotoma =

Scientific classification
- Domain: Eukaryota
- Kingdom: Animalia
- Phylum: Arthropoda
- Class: Insecta
- Order: Lepidoptera
- Superfamily: Noctuoidea
- Family: Erebidae
- Subfamily: Hypeninae
- Genus: Lophotoma; Turner, 1902

Genus of moths

Lophotoma is a genus of moths of the family Erebidae. The genus was described by Turner in 1902.

== Species ==
- Lophotoma diagrapha Turner, 1902
- Lophotoma metabula Turner, 1902
