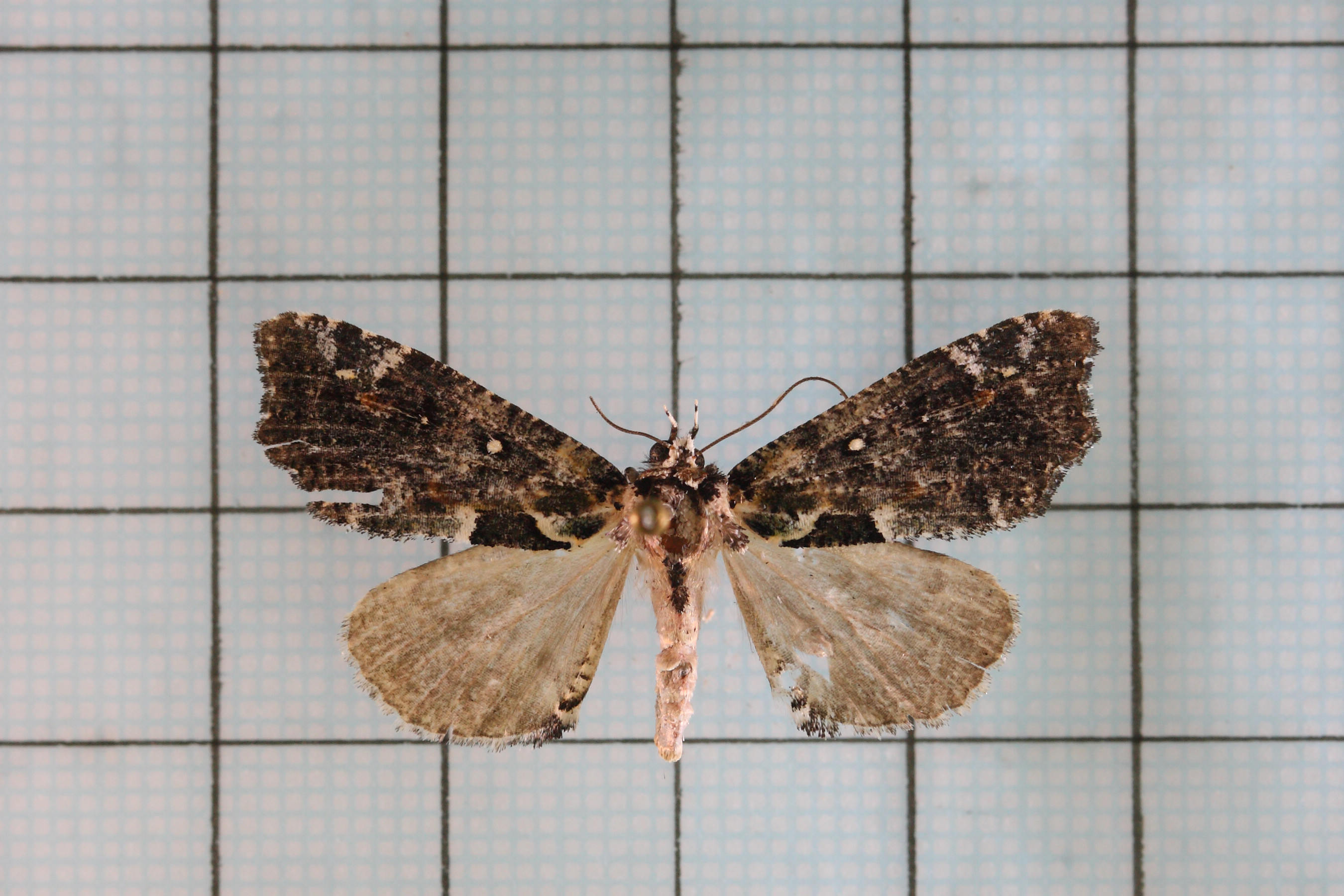

Scientific classification
- Kingdom: Animalia
- Phylum: Arthropoda
- Class: Insecta
- Order: Lepidoptera
- Superfamily: Noctuoidea
- Family: Erebidae
- Genus: Perciana
- Species: P. marmorea

Binomial name
- Perciana marmorea Walker, 1865

= Perciana marmorea =

Species of moth

Perciana marmorea is a species of moth of the family Erebidae first described by Francis Walker in 1865. It is found in Taiwan and India.
