= Elaphristis anthracitis =

Scientific classification
- Domain: Eukaryota
- Kingdom: Animalia
- Phylum: Arthropoda
- Class: Insecta
- Order: Lepidoptera
- Superfamily: Noctuoidea
- Family: Erebidae
- Genus: Elaphristis
- Species: E. anthracitis

Binomial name
- Elaphristis anthracitis (Turner, 1902)

Synonyms
- Zophochroa anthracitis Turner, 1902; Noorda molybdis Lower, 1903; Autocharis molybdis

Species of moth

Elaphristis anthracitis is a species of moth of the family Noctuidae. It is found in Australia, where it has been recorded from Queensland.

The wingspan is about 16 mm. The forewings are fuscous with a fine blackish line from three-fourths of the costa to three-fourths of the hindmargin. There is an indistinct fine black curved subterminal line. The hindwings are whitish-fuscous. Adults have been recorded on wing in December.
