= Panilla aviakala =

Scientific classification
- Kingdom: Animalia
- Phylum: Arthropoda
- Class: Insecta
- Order: Lepidoptera
- Superfamily: Noctuoidea
- Family: Erebidae
- Genus: Panilla
- Species: P. aviakala

Binomial name
- Panilla aviakala (Bippus, 2018)

Synonyms
- Cerynea aviakala Bippus, 2018

Species of moth

Panilla aviakala is a moth of the family Erebidae. It is a species of the genus Panilla. It is known from Réunion.
