= Hypertrocta posticalis =

Scientific classification
- Kingdom: Animalia
- Phylum: Arthropoda
- Class: Insecta
- Order: Lepidoptera
- Superfamily: Noctuoidea
- Family: Erebidae
- Genus: Hypertrocta
- Species: H. posticalis

Binomial name
- Hypertrocta posticalis (Walker, [1866])

Synonyms
- Moscha posticalis Walker, [1866]; Hypertrocta marmorata Hampson, 1893

Species of moth

Hypertrocta posticalis is a moth of the family Noctuidae first described by Francis Walker in 1866. It is found in Sri Lanka.
