= Mecistoptera =

Scientific classification
- Kingdom: Animalia
- Phylum: Arthropoda
- Class: Insecta
- Order: Lepidoptera
- Superfamily: Noctuoidea
- Family: Erebidae
- Subfamily: Calpinae
- Genus: Mecistoptera; Hampson, 1893

Genus of moths

Mecistoptera is a genus of moths of the family Noctuidae first described by George Hampson in 1893.

== Description ==
Palpi long, obliquely porrect (extending forward), where the second joint thickly clothed with scales. Third joint long and slender. Frontal tuft short. Antennae with long cilia in male, which is short in female. Thorax and abdomen smoothly scaled. Tibia nearly naked. Forewings long and narrow with produced and acute apex. Outer margin oblique and excurved at middle. Veins 8 and 9 anastomosing (fused) to form an areole. Hindwings with veins 3 and 4 from cell and vein 5 from below the middle of discocellulars. The outer margin truncate from vein 4 to anal angle.

== Species ==
- Mecistoptera albisigna Hampson, 1912
- Mecistoptera griseifusa Hampson, 1893
- Mecistoptera lithochroa Lower, 1903
