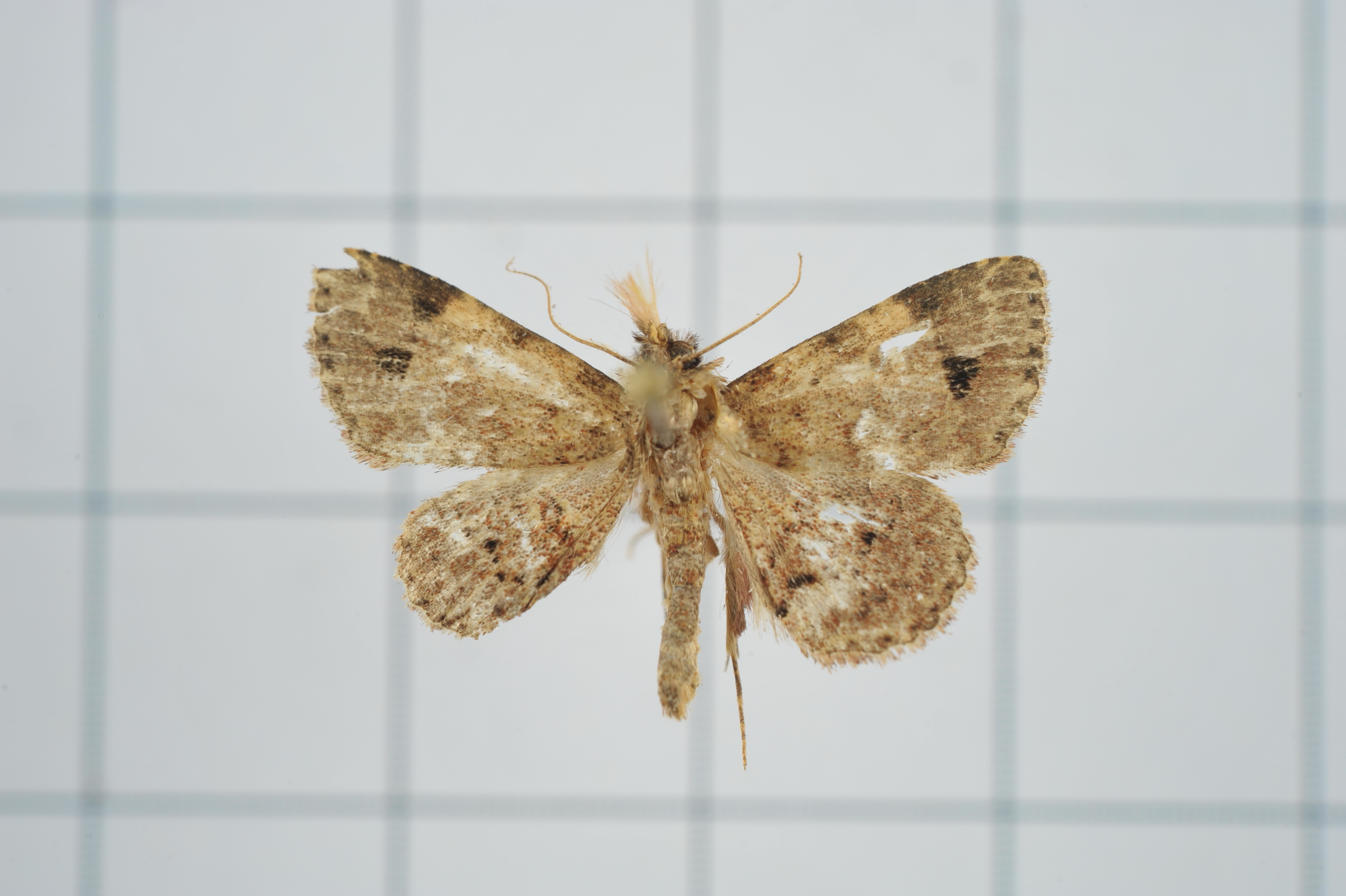
- Panilla dispila

Scientific classification
- Kingdom: Animalia
- Phylum: Arthropoda
- Clade: Pancrustacea
- Class: Insecta
- Order: Lepidoptera
- Superfamily: Noctuoidea
- Family: Erebidae
- Subfamily: Calpinae
- Genus: Panilla; Moore, 1885

Type species
- Homoptera dispila Walker

= Panilla =

Genus of moths

Panilla is a genus of moths of the family Erebidae erected by Frederic Moore in 1885.

== Description ==
Palpi obliquely extend forward, fringed with long hair below, and with long hair from their base. Third joint minute. Antennae ciliated in male. Metathorax with a slight tuft. Abdomen with dorsal tufts at base. Tibia fringed with long hair in male and spineless. Coxa of forelegs with long hair tufts. Forewings are short with round apex.

== Species ==
- Panilla aroa Bethune-Baker, 1906 (from New Guinea, Queensland)
- Panilla combusta Hampson, 1895 (from Bhutan, Sumatra)
- Panilla costipunctata Leech, 1900 (from Nepal, Guangdong, Taiwan, Japan)
- Panilla dispila Walker, 1865 (from Sri Lanka)
- Panilla mila Strand, 1920 (from Taiwan)
- Panilla homospila Hampson, 1914 (from Borneo)
- Panilla lophosticta Hampson, 1926 (from Papua New Guinea)
- Panilla minima (Butler, 1887) (from Solomon Islands)
- Panilla minor Yoshimoto, 2001 (from Taiwan)
- Panilla nigrinotata (Hampson, 1926) (from Philippines, Borneo, Peninsular Malaysia)
- Panilla petrina (Butler, 1879) (from Japan, Korea)
- Panilla spilotis (Meyrick, 1902) (from Queensland)
- Panilla terminalis (Hampson, 1914) (from Borneo)
- Panilla arabica (Hacker, 2011) (from Saudi Arabia)
- Panilla aviakala (Bippus, 2018) (from Réunion)
- Panilla remota Fischer, 2022. (from the Maldives)
