= Rhodina =

Scientific classification
- Kingdom: Animalia
- Phylum: Arthropoda
- Class: Insecta
- Order: Lepidoptera
- Superfamily: Noctuoidea
- Family: Erebidae
- Subfamily: Calpinae
- Genus: Rhodina; Guenée in Boisduval & Guenée, 1854

Synonyms
- Symmolpis Turner, 1902

Genus of moths

Rhodina is a genus of moths of the family Erebidae. The genus was erected by Achille Guenée in 1854.

== Species ==
- Rhodina falculalis Guenée, 1854
- Rhodina hyporrhoda (Turner, 1902)
