= Parilyrgis =

Scientific classification
- Domain: Eukaryota
- Kingdom: Animalia
- Phylum: Arthropoda
- Class: Insecta
- Order: Lepidoptera
- Superfamily: Noctuoidea
- Family: Erebidae
- Subfamily: Calpinae
- Genus: Parilyrgis; Bethune-Baker, 1908

Synonyms
- Ilyrgodes Hampson, 1926; Euzancla Turner, 1932

Genus of moths

Parilyrgis is a genus of moths of the family Erebidae. The genus was erected by George Thomas Bethune-Baker in 1908.

== Species ==
- Parilyrgis bisinuata (Hampson, 1926) Ambon Island
- Parilyrgis brunneata (Bethune-Baker, 1908) New Guinea
- Parilyrgis concolor Bethune-Baker, 1908 New Guinea
- Parilyrgis fumosa (Hampson, 1926) Solomon Islands
- Parilyrgis longirostris (Hampson, 1926) Bali
- Parilyrgis nyctichroa (Turner, 1908) Queensland
- Parilyrgis perfumida Hampson, 1926) New Guinea
- Parilyrgis tacta (Holland, 1900) Buru
