= Synolulis =

Scientific classification
- Kingdom: Animalia
- Phylum: Arthropoda
- Class: Insecta
- Order: Lepidoptera
- Superfamily: Noctuoidea
- Family: Erebidae
- Subfamily: Calpinae
- Genus: Synolulis; Hampson, 1926

Genus of moths

Synolulis is a genus of moths of the family Erebidae. The genus was erected by George Hampson in 1926.

== Species ==
- Synolulis diascia Hampson, 1926 New Guinea
- Synolulis ekeikei (Bethune-Baker, 1908) New Guinea
- Synolulis rhodinastis (Meyrick, 1902) Queensland, New Guinea
