= Argania (moth) =

Scientific classification
- Kingdom: Animalia
- Phylum: Arthropoda
- Clade: Pancrustacea
- Class: Insecta
- Order: Lepidoptera
- Superfamily: Noctuoidea
- Family: Erebidae
- Subfamily: Hypeninae
- Genus: Argania; H. Druce in Godman & Salvin, 1891

Genus of moths

Argania is a genus of moths of the family Erebidae. The genus was erected by Herbert Druce in 1891.

== Species ==
- Argania albimacula Dognin, 1914 Peru
- Argania pilosa H. Druce, 1891 Guatemala
