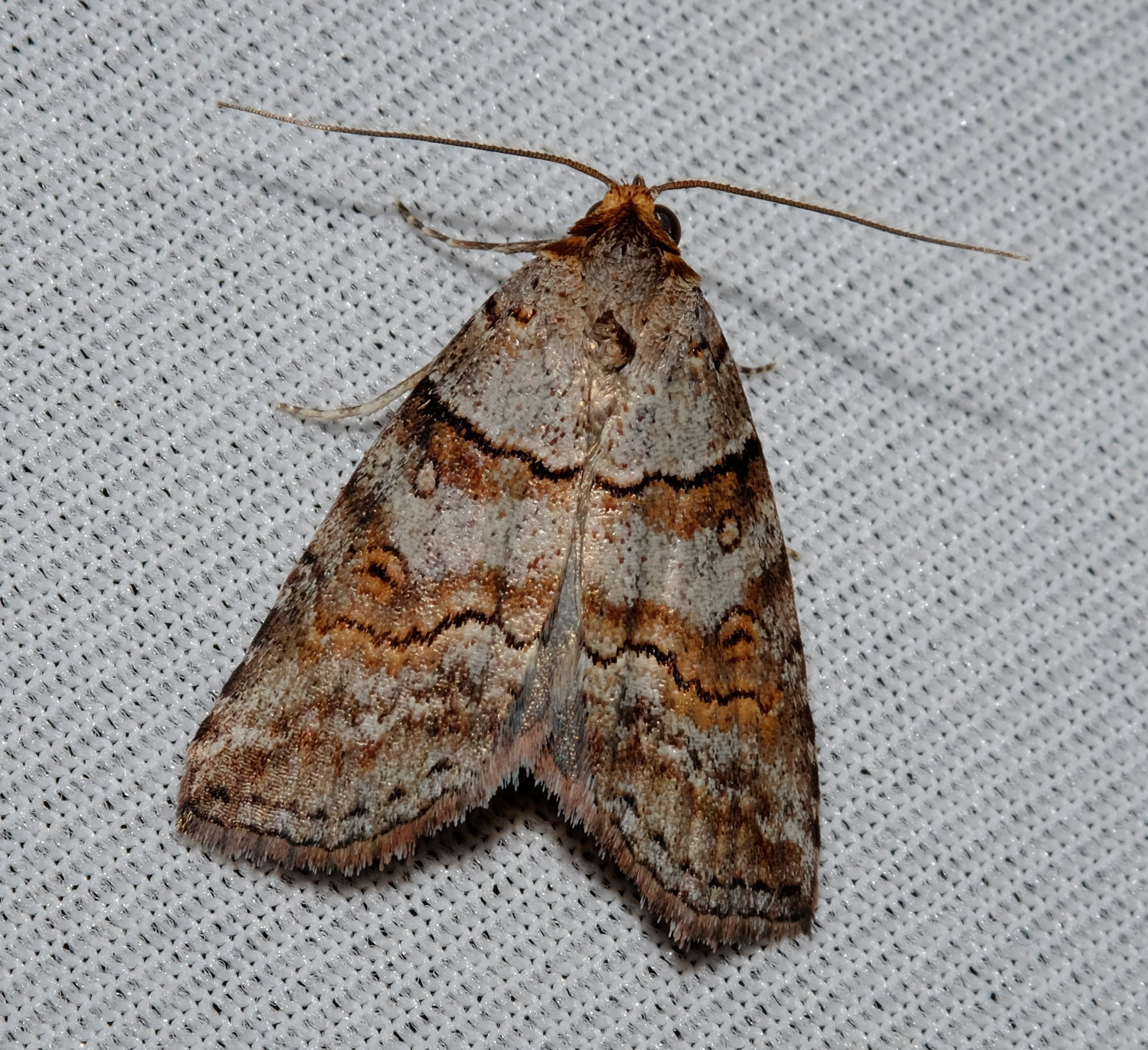
- Calathusa hypotherma, Australia

Scientific classification
- Kingdom: Animalia
- Phylum: Arthropoda
- Class: Insecta
- Order: Lepidoptera
- Superfamily: Noctuoidea
- Family: Nolidae
- Subfamily: Chloephorinae
- Genus: Calathusa; Walker, 1858

Synonyms
- Sina Walker, 1865; Hisbanda Walker, [1866]; Steneugoa Hampson, 1914

= Calathusa =

Genus of moths

Calathusa is a genus in the moth family Nolidae, erected by Francis Walker in 1858. Many of its species occur in Australia.

== Species ==
These 33 species belong to the genus Calathusa:

- Calathusa aethalistis Lower, 1915
- Calathusa allopis Meyrick, 1902
- Calathusa anisocentra Turner, 1944
- Calathusa argentea Holloway, 1979
- Calathusa basicunea Walker, 1858
- Calathusa basicunoides Holloway, 1979
- Calathusa basirufa Holloway, 1979
- Calathusa brehoa Holloway, 1979
- Calathusa charactis Meyrick, 1902
- Calathusa cinerea Holloway, 1979
- Calathusa cyrtosticha Turner, 1929
- Calathusa dispila Turner, 1902
- Calathusa dubia Wileman, 1916
- Calathusa eremna Turner, 1902
- Calathusa glaucopasta Turner, 1941
- Calathusa hemicapna Turner, 1939
- Calathusa hemiscia Lower, 1915
- Calathusa humboldti Holloway, 1979
- Calathusa hypotherma Lower, 1903
- Calathusa ischnodes Turner, 1903
- Calathusa maritima Turner, 1941
- Calathusa mesospila Turner, 1902
- Calathusa metableta Turner, 1902
- Calathusa nubilosa Hampson, 1914
- Calathusa octogesima Turner, 1902
- Calathusa phaeoneura Turner, 1939
- Calathusa polyplecta Turner, 1929
- Calathusa stenophylla Turner, 1902
- Calathusa striata Holloway, 1979
- Calathusa talesea Holloway, 1979
- Calathusa taphreuta Meyrick, 1902
- Calathusa thermosticha Lower, 1915
- Calathusa uniformis Holloway, 1979
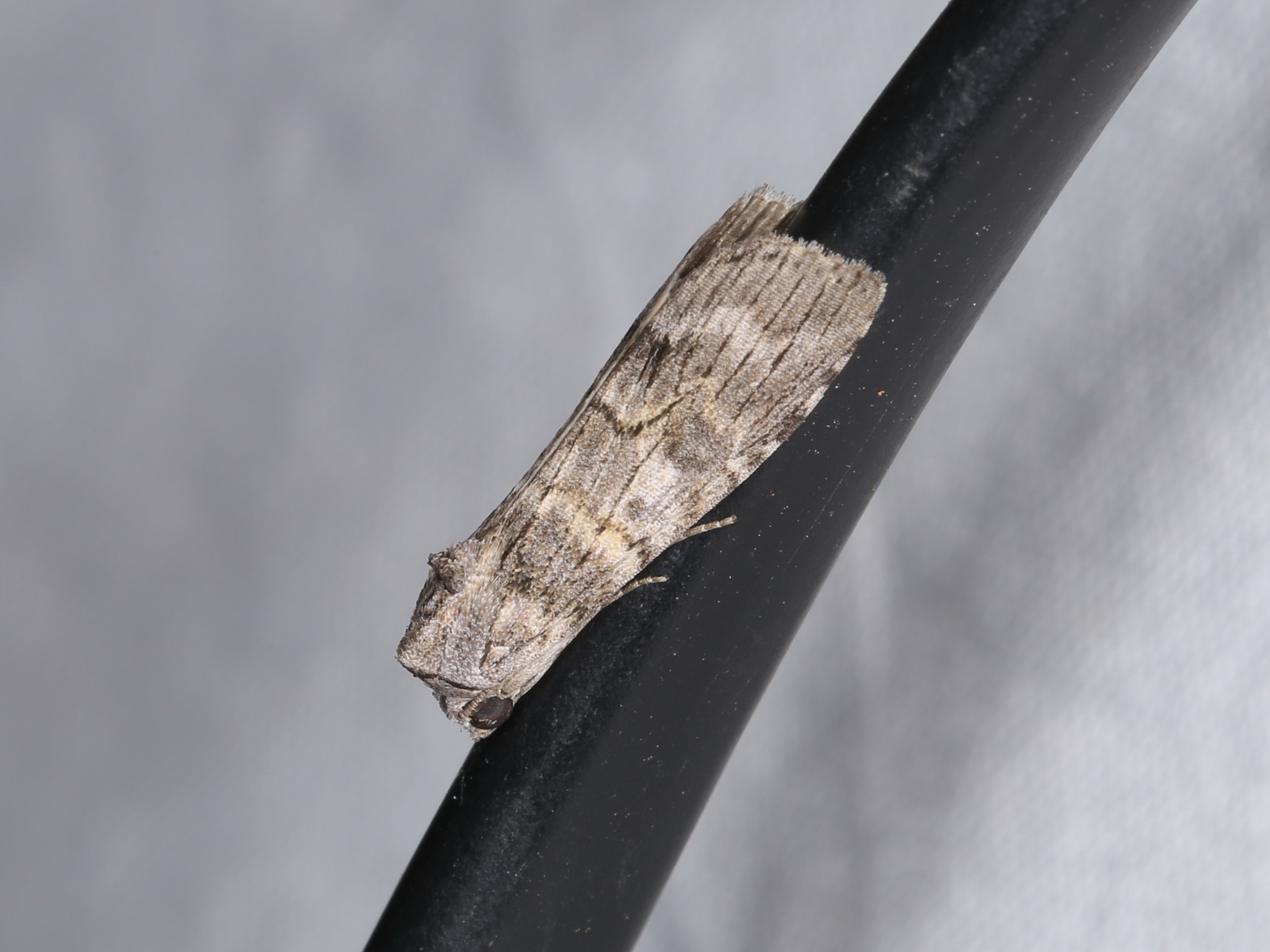
Calathusa ischnodes, Australia

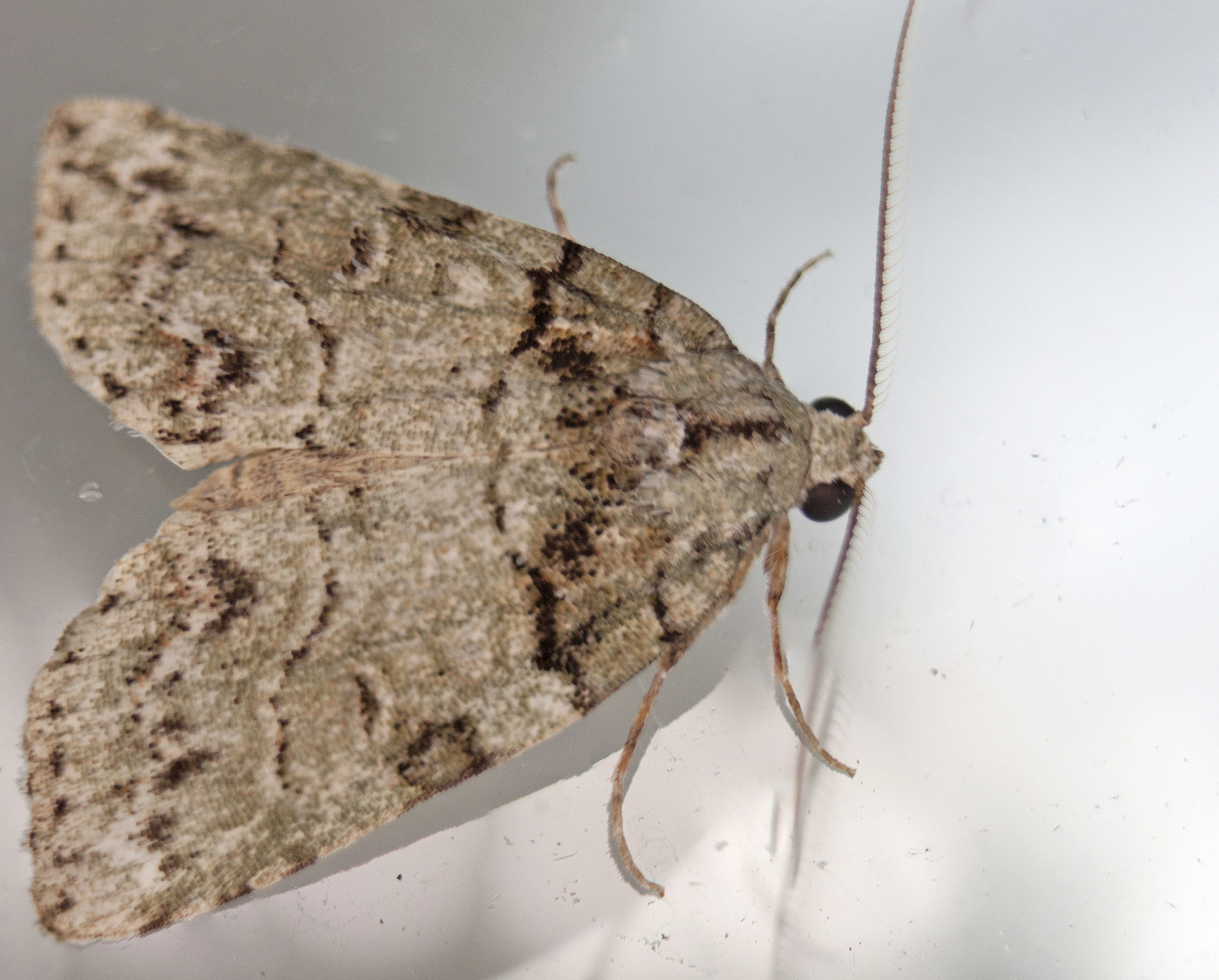
Calathusa mesospila, Australia

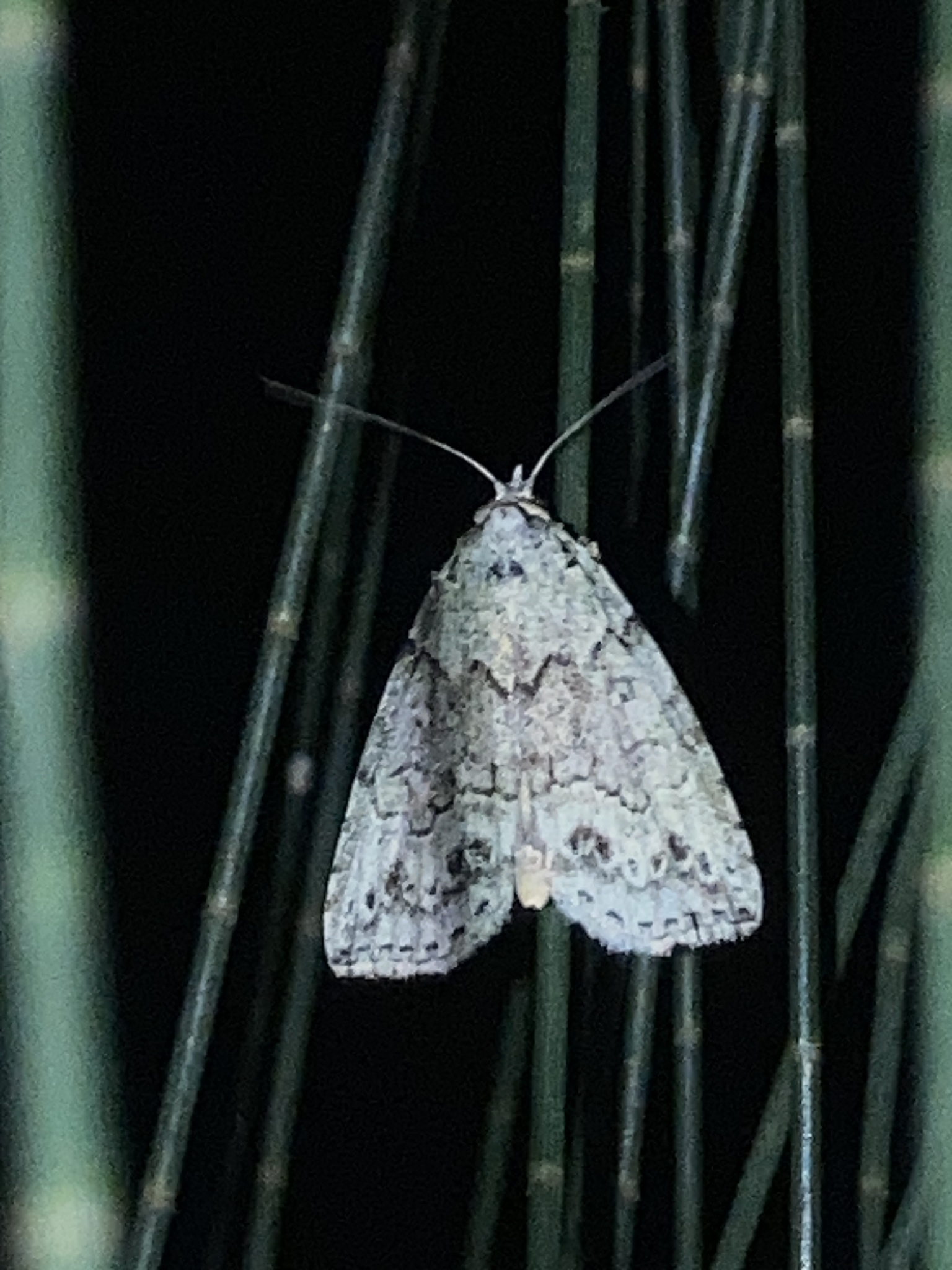
Calathusa basicunea, Australia

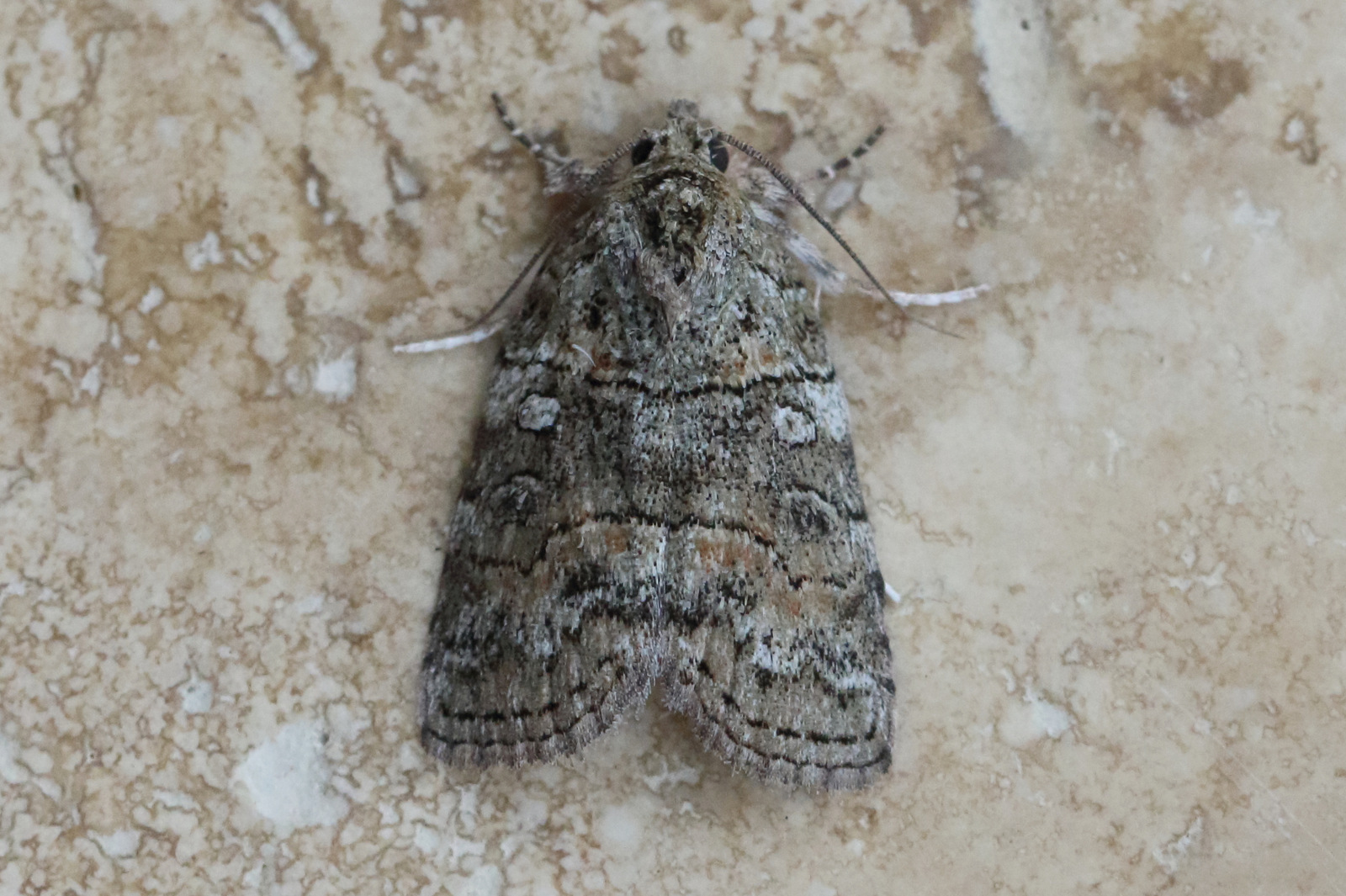
Calathusa dispila, Australia

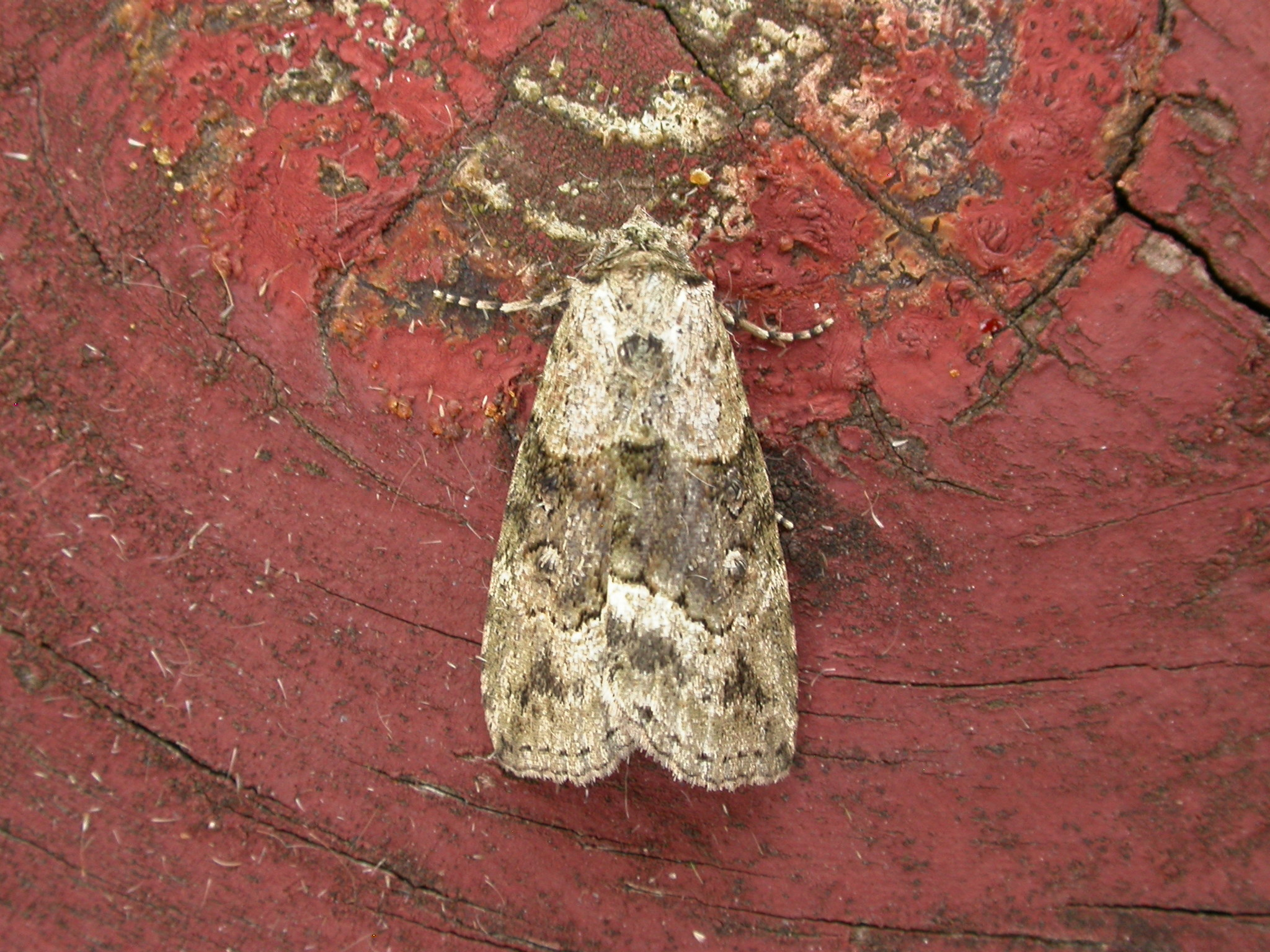
Calathusa cyrtosticha, Australia

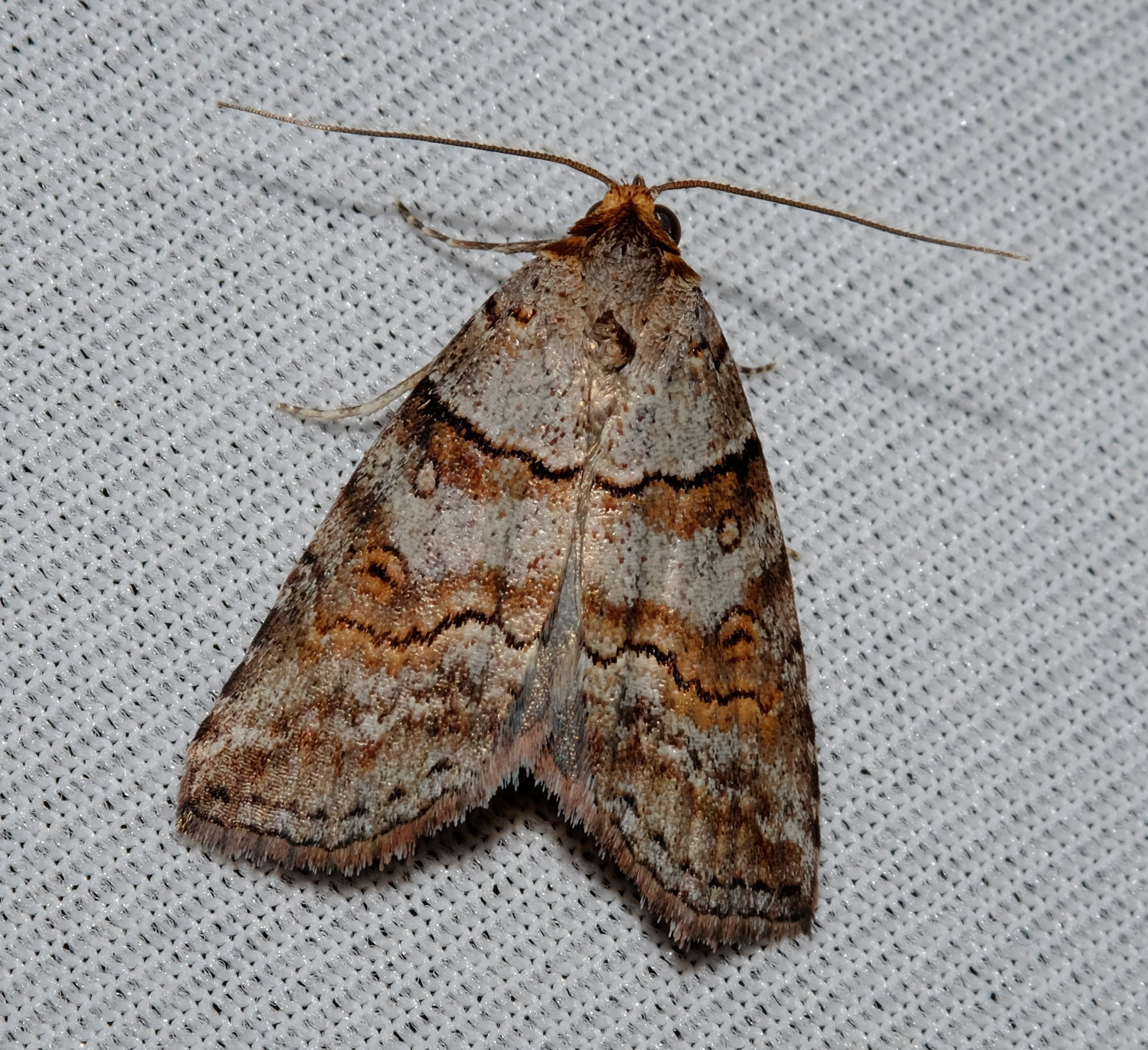
Calathusa hypotherma, Australia
