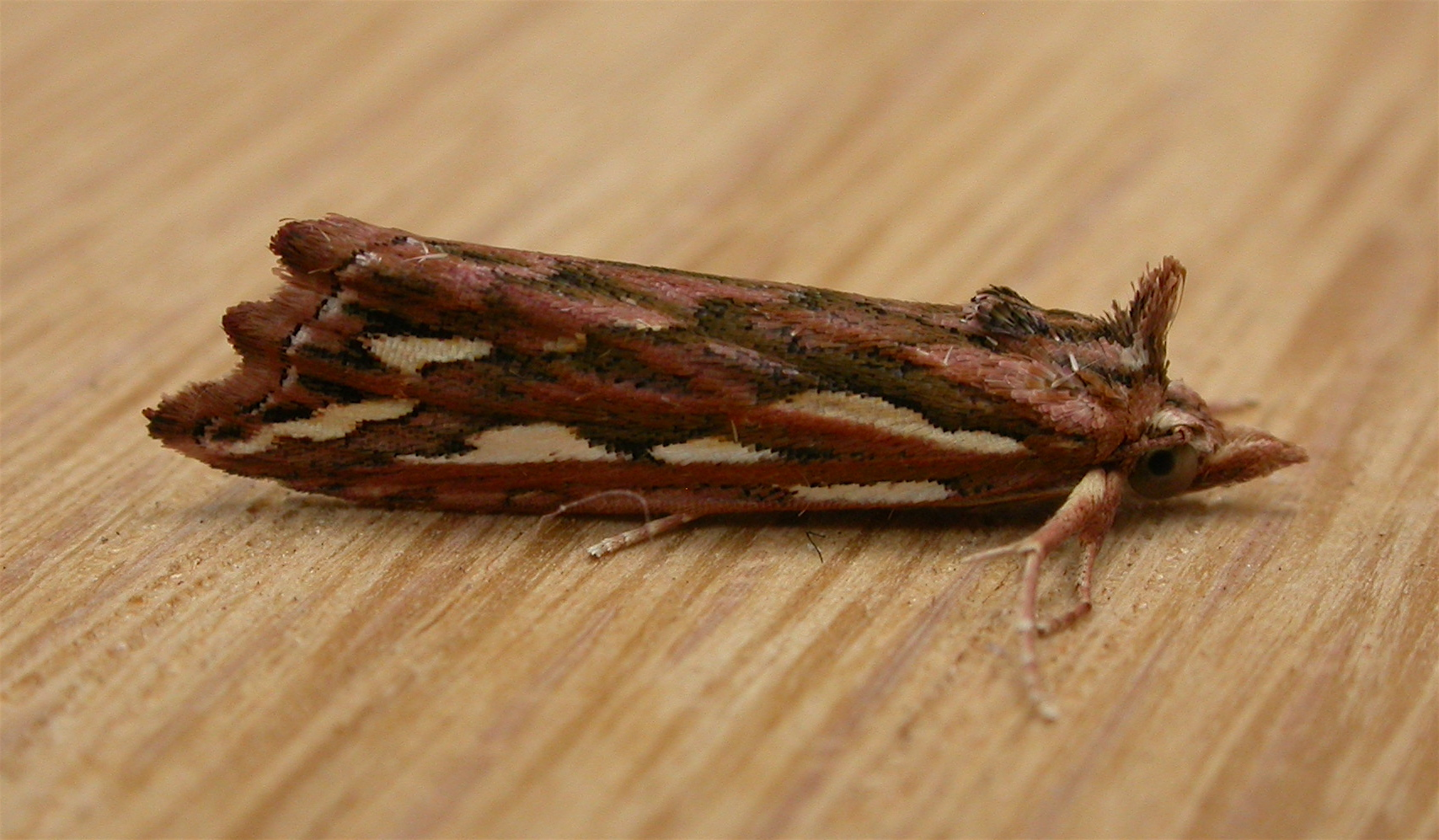
- Meyrickella torquesauria

Scientific classification
- Domain: Eukaryota
- Kingdom: Animalia
- Phylum: Arthropoda
- Class: Insecta
- Order: Lepidoptera
- Superfamily: Noctuoidea
- Family: Erebidae
- Subfamily: Calpinae
- Genus: Meyrickella; Berg, 1898

= Meyrickella =

Genus of moths

Meyrickella is a genus of moths of the family Erebidae. The genus was erected by Carlos Berg in 1898.

== Species ==
- Meyrickella ruptellus Walker, 1863
- Meyrickella torquesauria Lucas, 1892
