= Mecistoptera griseifusa =

Scientific classification
- Kingdom: Animalia
- Phylum: Arthropoda
- Clade: Pancrustacea
- Class: Insecta
- Order: Lepidoptera
- Superfamily: Noctuoidea
- Family: Erebidae
- Genus: Mecistoptera
- Species: M. griseifusa

Binomial name
- Mecistoptera griseifusa Hampson, 1893

Species of moth

Mecistoptera griseifusa is a moth of the family Noctuidae first described by George Hampson in 1893. It is found in Sri Lanka.
