= Pherechoa =

Scientific classification
- Domain: Eukaryota
- Kingdom: Animalia
- Phylum: Arthropoda
- Class: Insecta
- Order: Lepidoptera
- Superfamily: Noctuoidea
- Family: Erebidae
- Subfamily: Calpinae
- Genus: Pherechoa; Turner, 1932
- Species: P. crypsichlora

Binomial name
- Pherechoa crypsichlora Turner, 1932

Genus of moths

Pherechoa is a monotypic moth genus of the family Erebidae. Its only species, Pherechoa crypsichlora, is known from the Australian state of Queensland. Both the genus and the species were first described by Turner in 1932.
