= Prionopterina =

Scientific classification
- Kingdom: Animalia
- Phylum: Arthropoda
- Class: Insecta
- Order: Lepidoptera
- Superfamily: Noctuoidea
- Family: Erebidae
- Subfamily: Calpinae
- Genus: Prionopterina; Hampson, 1926

Genus of moths

Prionopterina is a genus of moths of the family Erebidae. The genus was erected by George Hampson in 1926.

== Species ==
- Prionopterina grammatistis (Meyrick, 1897)
- Prionopterina modesta Turner, 1936
- Prionopterina tritosticha (Turner, 1902)
