= Falcimala =

Scientific classification
- Kingdom: Animalia
- Phylum: Arthropoda
- Class: Insecta
- Order: Lepidoptera
- Superfamily: Noctuoidea
- Family: Erebidae
- Subfamily: Herminiinae
- Genus: Falcimala; Hampson, 1895

Synonyms
- Epitripta Turner, 1902

Genus of moths

Falcimala is a genus of moths of the family Noctuidae. The genus was erected by George Hampson in 1895.

== Species ==
- Falcimala acosmopis (Turner, 1902) Australia
- Falcimala angulifalcis Rothschild, 1915 New Guinea
- Falcimala atrata (Butler, 1889) Dharmsala
- Falcimala diacia C. Swinhoe, 1905 Khasia Hills
- Falcimala lativitta (Moore, 1882) Darjeeling
- Falcimala morapanoides Rothschild, 1915 New Guinea
- Falcimala ochrealis Hampson, 1896 Bhutan
- Falcimala sassana Strand, 1918 Congo
