= Hepatica (moth) =

Scientific classification
- Kingdom: Animalia
- Phylum: Arthropoda
- Clade: Pancrustacea
- Class: Insecta
- Order: Lepidoptera
- Superfamily: Noctuoidea
- Family: Erebidae
- Subfamily: Hypeninae
- Genus: Hepatica; Staudinger, 1892

Synonyms
- Ananepa Hampson, 1926; Folka C. Swinhoe, 1917; Anepa C. Swinhoe, 1905

Genus of moths

Hepatica is a genus of moths of the family Erebidae. The genus was described by Staudinger in 1892.

== Species ==
Some species of this genus are:

- Hepatica anceps Staudinger, 1892 (from south-eastern Siberia)
- Hepatica aurantia de Joannis, 1930 (from Vietnam)
- Hepatica bhagha (Swinhoe, 1917) (from north-eastern Himalayas, Taiwan)
- Hepatica contigua Wileman, 1915
- Hepatica doda (Swinhoe, 1902) Peninsular Malaysia, Borneo
- Hepatica duplicilinea (Hampson, 1895) (from Manipur)
- Hepatica glaucescens (Hampson, 1895) (from Sikkim)
- Hepatica irrorata (Wileman & South, 1917) (from north-eastern Himalayas, Taiwan, Borneo)
- Hepatica linealis (Leech, 1889) (from Japan)
- Hepatica nakatanii Sugi, 1982 (from Japan)
- Hepatica opalina Butler, 1879
- Hepatica orbicularis Holloway, 2005 (from Borneo)
- Hepatica oxydata (Hampson, 1898) {from India}
- Hepatica seinoi Sugi, 1982 (from Japan)
- Hepatica tarmanni Kobes, 1983
