= Mianeh =

Mianeh, Miana or Miyaneh city may refer to:

== Places ==
=== Burkina Faso ===
- Miana (Burkina), a village in Ouarkoye Department

=== Iran ===
- Mianeh, East Azerbaijan, a city in East Azerbaijan Province
  - Mianeh (electoral district), a 5th electoral district in the East Azerbaijan Province
- Mianeh-ye Kord Ahmad, a village in East Azerbaijan Province
- Mianeh County (Iran), in East Azerbaijan Province
- Mianeh, Fars
- Mianeh-ye Jenjan, Fars Province
- Miyaneh-ye Olya, Fars Province
- Miyaneh-ye Sofla, Fars Province
- Mianeh, Kermanshah
- Meyaneh, Kohgiluyeh and Boyer-Ahmad
- Mianeh, Kurdistan
- Meydaneh or Mīāneh, Kamyaran, Kurdistan
- Miana, Iran, Mazandaran Province
- Mianej, Qazvin or Mianeh

=== Turkmenistan ===
- Miana, Turkmenistan

== Other uses ==
- Miana (genus), a former genus of moth
- Miana (Pashtun tribe)
- Miyana (disambiguation)
