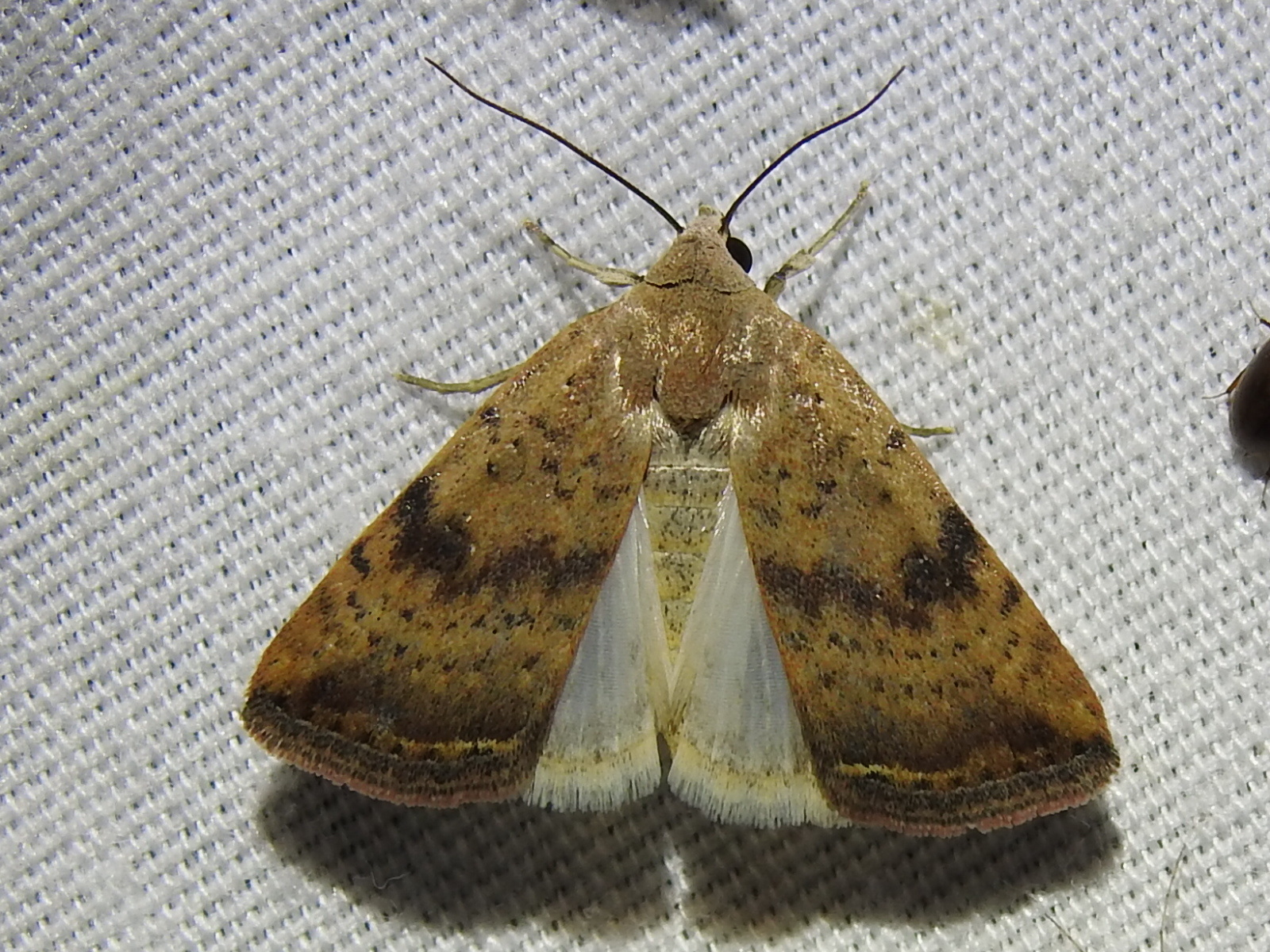

Scientific classification
- Kingdom: Animalia
- Phylum: Arthropoda
- Class: Insecta
- Order: Lepidoptera
- Superfamily: Noctuoidea
- Family: Noctuidae
- Tribe: Condicini
- Genus: Micrathetis
- Species: M. triplex

Binomial name
- Micrathetis triplex (Walker, 1857)

= Micrathetis triplex =

Species of moth

Micrathetis triplex, the triplex cutworm moth, is a species of moth in the family Noctuidae (the owlet moths). It is found in North America.
