= Homophoberia cristata =

Scientific classification
- Kingdom: Animalia
- Phylum: Arthropoda
- Class: Insecta
- Order: Lepidoptera
- Superfamily: Noctuoidea
- Family: Noctuidae
- Tribe: Condicini
- Genus: Homophoberia
- Species: H. cristata

Binomial name
- Homophoberia cristata Morrison, 1875

Synonyms
- Neoerastria caduca (Grote, 1876)

Species of moth

Homophoberia cristata, known generally as the waterlily moth or crested wedge-spot moth, is a species of moth in the family Noctuidae (the owlet moths). It is found in North America.

The MONA or Hodges number for Homophoberia cristata is 9056.
