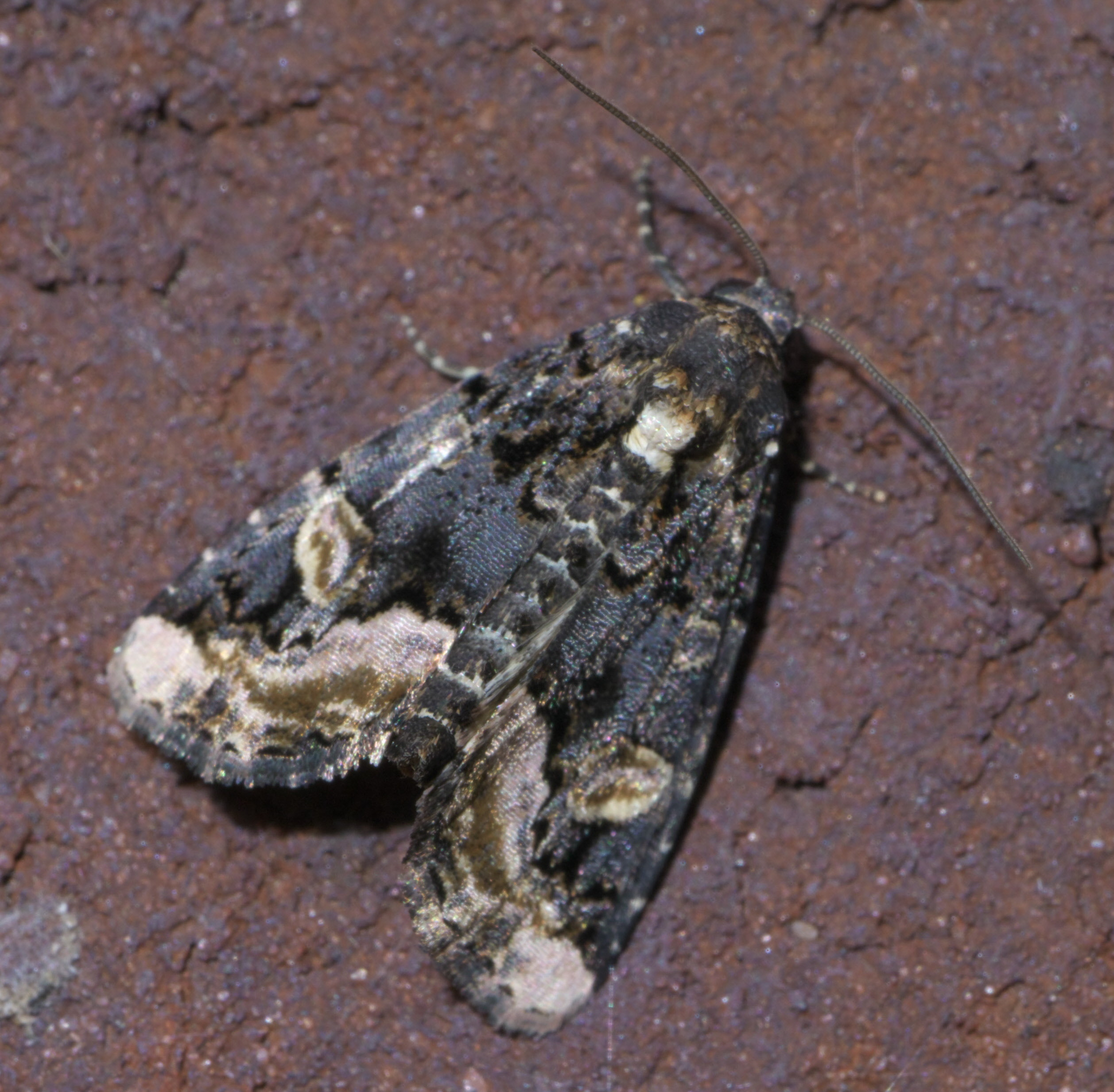

Scientific classification
- Kingdom: Animalia
- Phylum: Arthropoda
- Clade: Pancrustacea
- Class: Insecta
- Order: Lepidoptera
- Superfamily: Noctuoidea
- Family: Noctuidae
- Tribe: Condicini
- Genus: Homophoberia
- Species: H. apicosa

Binomial name
- Homophoberia apicosa (Haworth, 1809)

= Homophoberia apicosa =

Species of moth

Homophoberia apicosa, the black wedge-spot, is an owlet moth (family Noctuidae). The species was first described by Adrian Hardy Haworth in 1809.

The MONA or Hodges number for Homophoberia apicosa is 9057.

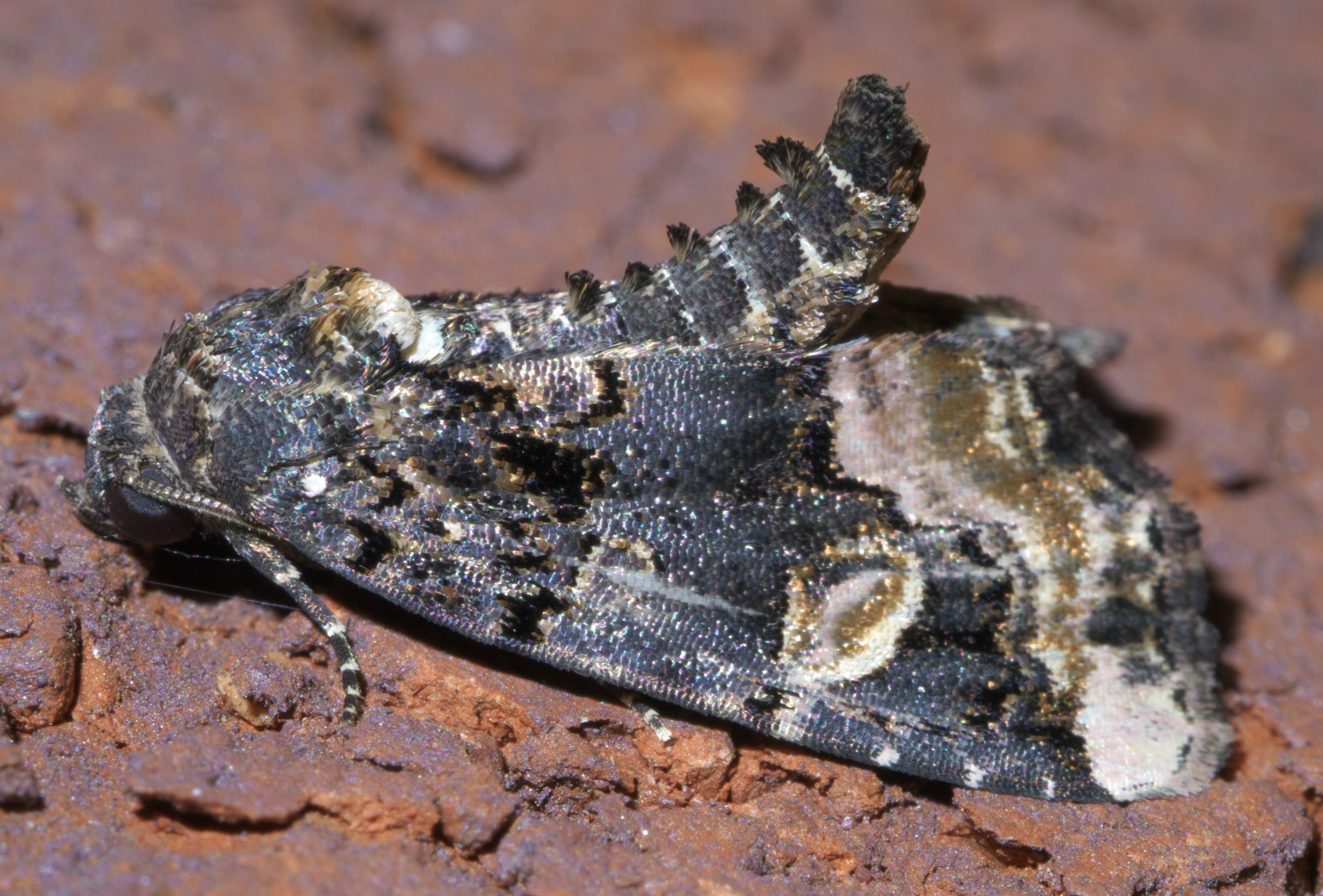
