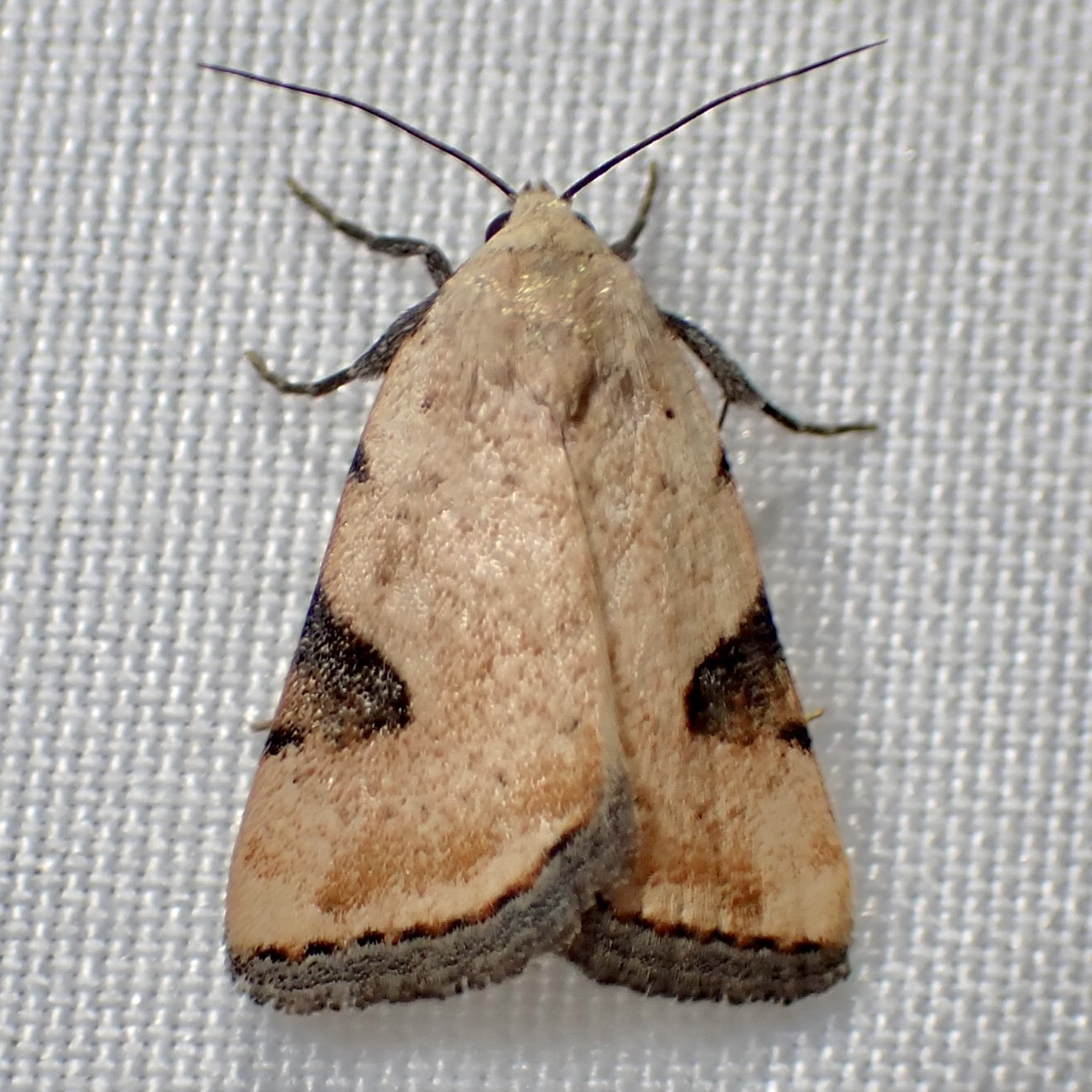

Scientific classification
- Domain: Eukaryota
- Kingdom: Animalia
- Phylum: Arthropoda
- Class: Insecta
- Order: Lepidoptera
- Superfamily: Noctuoidea
- Family: Noctuidae
- Tribe: Condicini
- Genus: Micrathetis
- Species: M. costiplaga

Binomial name
- Micrathetis costiplaga (Smith, 1908)

= Micrathetis costiplaga =

Species of moth

Micrathetis costiplaga is a species of moth in the family Noctuidae (the owlet moths). It is found in North America.
