= Diastema cnossia =

Scientific classification
- Domain: Eukaryota
- Kingdom: Animalia
- Phylum: Arthropoda
- Class: Insecta
- Order: Lepidoptera
- Superfamily: Noctuoidea
- Family: Noctuidae
- Tribe: Leuconyctini
- Genus: Diastema
- Species: D. cnossia

Binomial name
- Diastema cnossia (H. Druce, 1889)

Species of moth

Diastema cnossia is a species of moth in the family Noctuidae (the owlet moths).

The MONA or Hodges number for Diastema cnossia is 9068.
