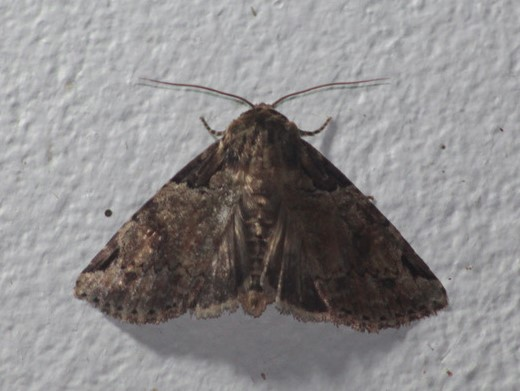

Scientific classification
- Kingdom: Animalia
- Phylum: Arthropoda
- Clade: Pancrustacea
- Class: Insecta
- Order: Lepidoptera
- Superfamily: Noctuoidea
- Family: Noctuidae
- Tribe: Condicini
- Genus: Stibaera
- Species: S. curvilineata

Binomial name
- Stibaera curvilineata (Hampson, 1924)

= Stibaera curvilineata =

Species of moth

Stibaera curvilineata is a species of moth in the owlet moth family Noctuidae. It is found in North America.
