= Miñana =

Miñana is a surname of Valencian origin.

== List of people with the surname ==
- Terenci Miñana i Andrés (1884–1954), Valencian pilota player
- Víctor Camino Miñana (born 1994), Spanish politician from Valencia

== See also ==
- Mianeh (disambiguation)
