= Miana (moth) =

Genus of moths

Miana is a former genus of moths, including these species:

- Miana atomaria, now Ogdoconta cinereola
- Miana expolita, now Photedes captiuncula
- Miana falsa, now Koyaga falsa
- Miana lucasii , now Proteuxoa florescens
- Miana literosa, now Mesoligia literosa
- Miana palpalis, now Amyna natalis
- Miana segregata, now Niphonyx segregata
- Miana vincta, now Elaphria chalcedonia
