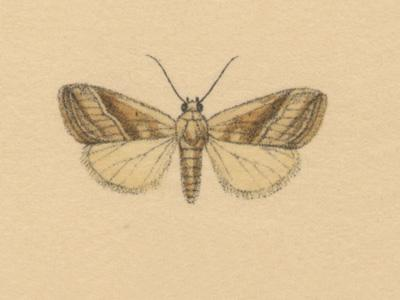

Scientific classification
- Domain: Eukaryota
- Kingdom: Animalia
- Phylum: Arthropoda
- Class: Insecta
- Order: Lepidoptera
- Superfamily: Noctuoidea
- Family: Noctuidae
- Genus: Micrathetis
- Species: M. dasarada

Binomial name
- Micrathetis dasarada (H. Druce, 1898)

Synonyms
- Thalpochares dasarada H. Druce, 1898; Micathetis dasarada; Micrathetis dasarada f. dacula Dyar, 1913

= Micrathetis dasarada =

Species of moth

Micrathetis dasarada is a moth of the family Noctuidae first described by Herbert Druce in 1898. It is found from Mexico to the Amazon basin, as well as on Jamaica and Cuba.
