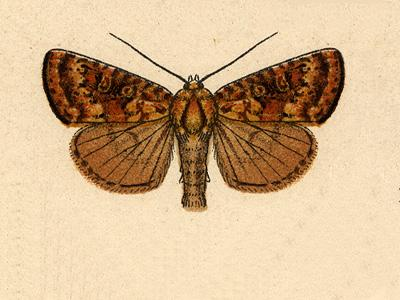
- Perigea xanthioides

Scientific classification
- Kingdom: Animalia
- Phylum: Arthropoda
- Class: Insecta
- Order: Lepidoptera
- Superfamily: Noctuoidea
- Family: Noctuidae
- Tribe: Condicini
- Genus: Perigea; Guenée, 1852

= Perigea =

Genus of moths

Perigea is a genus of moths of the family Noctuidae. The genus was erected by Achille Guenée in 1852.

== Species ==
The genus includes the following species:

- Perigea adornata Walker, 1865
- Perigea aeruginosa Schaus, 1911 Costa Rica
- Perigea agalla (Dognin, 1897) Ecuador, Peru
- Perigea agnonia Druce, 1890 Mexico, Guatemala, Panama
- Perigea baalba Schaus, 1921 Guatemala
- Perigea bahamica Hampson, 1908 Florida, the Bahamas
- Perigea berinda Druce, 1889 Mexico, Guatemala, Panama, Greater Antilles, Paraguay
- Perigea camerunica Gaede, 1915 Cameroon
- Perigea cupricolora Hampson, 1914 Kenya
- Perigea decaryi Viette, 1965 Madagascar
- Perigea dinawa Bethune-Baker, 1906 Borneo, New Guinea
- Perigea discincta (Butler, 1879) Brazil (Amazonas)
- Perigea drusilla Schaus, 1914 French Guiana
- Perigea eguigureni (Dognin, 1890) Ecuador
- Perigea emilacta Berio, 1977
- Perigea enixa Grote, 1875 Texas
- Perigea ethiopica Hampson, 1908 Uganda
- Perigea furtiva Guenée, 1852
- Perigea galaxia Butler, 1883 Punjab
- Perigea glaucoptera (Guenée, 1852) Brazil (Rio de Janeiro, São Paulo)
- Perigea gloria Becker & Miller, 2002
- Perigea grandirena (Hampson, 1902) Natal
- Perigea hippia Druce, 1889 Panama, Mexico
- Perigea ignitincta (Maassen, 1890) Ecuador, Peru
- Perigea illicita Schaus, 1911 Costa Rica
- Perigea impura Köhler, 1979 Peru
- Perigea kalma (Schaus, 1894) Mexico, Guatemala, Panama
- Perigea leucanioides Hampson, 1908 Mexico, Venezuela
- Perigea leucopis Hampson, 1908 Brazil (Rio de Janeiro)
- Perigea leucostrota Hampson, 1908 Peru
- Perigea lineata (Druce, 1889) Costa Rica, Panama
- Perigea menota Dyar, 1912 Mexico
- Perigea metarhoda Hampson, 1908 New Guinea
- Perigea micrippia Dyar, 1912 Mexico
- Perigea naolina (Schaus, 1906) Brazil (Rio de Janeiro)
- Perigea nigripalpis Walker, [1857] Venezuela
- Perigea octophora Hampson, 1908 Peru
- Perigea paragalla Dognin, 1914 Colombia
- Perigea parastichtoides Hampson, 1908 Brazil (São Paulo)
- Perigea pectinata (Herrich-Schäffer, 1868) Cuba, Haiti
- Perigea perparvula Schaus, 1894 Brazil (Paraná), Paraguay
- Perigea poliopasta Hampson, 1908 Trinidad, British Guiana, Bolivia
- Perigea punctata Köhler, 1979 Peru
- Perigea pyrocausta Hampson, 1911 Colombia
- Perigea pyrosticta Druce, 1908 Peru
- Perigea pyrostigma Hampson, 1908 Argentina
- Perigea quadrimacula (Mabille, [1900]) eastern Africa, Natal
- Perigea secorva Schaus, 1906 Brazil (Paraná, São Paulo), Paraguay
- Perigea summota Schaus, 1911 Costa Rica
- Perigea xanthioides Guenée, 1852 New York - Florida, Pennsylvania, Kansas, Texas, Jamaica, Cuba, Trinidad, Brazil (Rio de Janeiro)
- Perigea xylophasioides Guenée, 1852 Brazil (Rio de Janeiro)
