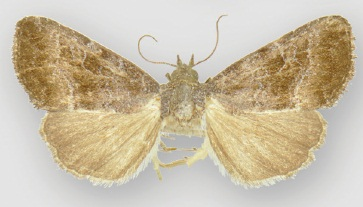
- Female
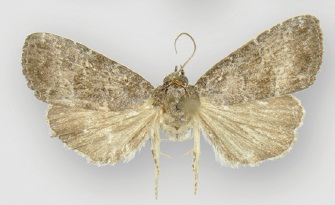
- Male

Scientific classification
- Kingdom: Animalia
- Phylum: Arthropoda
- Class: Insecta
- Order: Lepidoptera
- Superfamily: Noctuoidea
- Family: Noctuidae
- Genus: Ogdoconta
- Species: O. fergusoni

Binomial name
- Ogdoconta fergusoni Metzler & Lafontaine, 2013

= Ogdoconta fergusoni =

Species of moth

Ogdoconta fergusoni is a moth in the family Noctuidae. It is found in Florida, southern Mississippi and southern Louisiana.

The length of the forewings is 9 mm for males and 9–10.5 mm for females. The dorsal surface ground color of the forewings is gray brown with dirty-white-tipped scales. The hindwing scales are fuscous-tipped pale gray and the terminal line is finely marked dark brown.

== Etymology ==
The species is named in honor of Douglas Campbell Ferguson.
