= Micrathetis tecnion =

Scientific classification
- Kingdom: Animalia
- Phylum: Arthropoda
- Class: Insecta
- Order: Lepidoptera
- Superfamily: Noctuoidea
- Family: Noctuidae
- Genus: Micrathetis
- Species: M. tecnion

Binomial name
- Micrathetis tecnion Dyar, 1914

Species of moth

Micrathetis tecnion is a species of moth in the family Noctuidae (the owlet moths). It is found in North America.

The MONA or Hodges number for Micrathetis tecnion is 9646.
