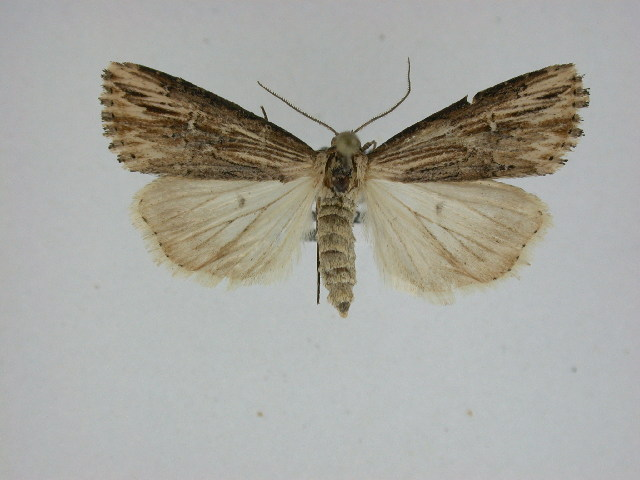
- Crambodes talidiformis

Scientific classification
- Kingdom: Animalia
- Phylum: Arthropoda
- Class: Insecta
- Order: Lepidoptera
- Superfamily: Noctuoidea
- Family: Noctuidae
- Subfamily: Condicinae
- Genus: Crambodes; Guenée in Boisduval & Guenée, 1852
- Species: C. talidiformis

Binomial name
- Crambodes talidiformis Guenée, 1852

Synonyms
- Carvanca conjungens Walker, 1858

= Crambodes =

Genus and species of moth

Crambodes is a monotypic moth genus of the family Noctuidae. Its only species, Crambodes talidiformis, is found in the eastern United States as far west as Kansas, Texas and Colorado. Both the genus and species were first described by Achille Guenée in 1852.
