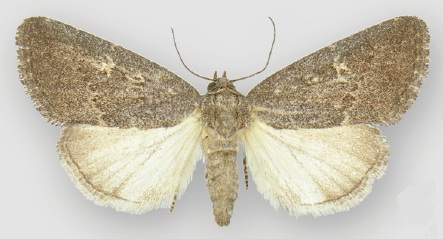
- Female
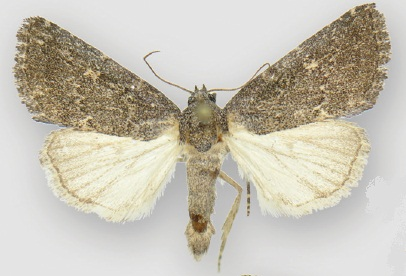
- Male

Scientific classification
- Kingdom: Animalia
- Phylum: Arthropoda
- Class: Insecta
- Order: Lepidoptera
- Superfamily: Noctuoidea
- Family: Noctuidae
- Genus: Ogdoconta
- Species: O. satana

Binomial name
- Ogdoconta satana Metzler, Knudson & Poole, 2013

= Ogdoconta satana =

Species of moth

Ogdoconta satana is a moth in the family Noctuidae. It is found in western Texas and Carlsbad Caverns National Park in Eddy County, New Mexico. It is probably also present in Mexico.

The length of the forewings is 10–13 mm for males and 10–14 mm for females. The forewings are completely suffused with dark ash black, and the hindwings are contrastingly pale. Most of the maculation is obscure. Both the orbicular and reniform spots are present as small contrasting light spots or are obscure. The orbicular spot is small and round with an ash-black center, and the reniform spot, filled with ash black, is obscure towards the costa and posterior margin. The hindwings are contrastingly pale. The underside in both males and females can vary from dirty white with scattered dark-fuscous scales to dark fuscous with scattered dirty-white scales. The orbicular and reniform spots on the underside range from prominent to obscure, and the color may be pale gray, yellow, or dirty white, filled with dark gray, or black.

== Etymology ==
The scientific name satana comes from the Marvel comic book fictional character Satana, a child of Satan and sinister character, who taught black magic. The name refers to the black (often equated with evil) color of the adult moth.
