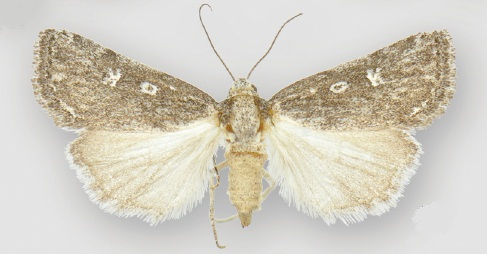
- Female, dark form

Scientific classification
- Kingdom: Animalia
- Phylum: Arthropoda
- Class: Insecta
- Order: Lepidoptera
- Superfamily: Noctuoidea
- Family: Noctuidae
- Subfamily: Condicinae
- Genus: Fotella; Grote, 1882
- Species: F. notalis

Binomial name
- Fotella notalis Grote, 1882

Synonyms
- Caradrina fragosa Grote, 1883; Fotella olivia Barnes & McDunnough, 1912; Hadenella cervoides Barnes & McDunnough, 1912; Fotella olivioides Barnes & Benjamin, 1926

= Fotella =

Genus and species of moth

Fotella is a monotypic moth genus of the family Noctuidae. Its only species, Fotella notalis, is found in the US in the Big Bend region of western Texas, southern Arizona, southern California and southern Nevada. The habitat consists of dry deserts. Both the genus and species were first described by Augustus Radcliffe Grote in 1882.

The length of the forewings is 10–13 mm.
