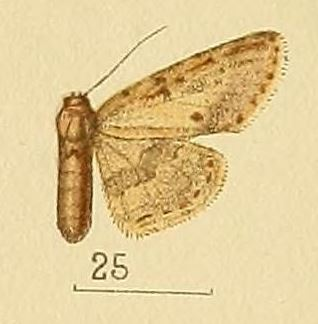
- Kenrickodes titanica

Scientific classification
- Kingdom: Animalia
- Phylum: Arthropoda
- Class: Insecta
- Order: Lepidoptera
- Superfamily: Noctuoidea
- Family: Noctuidae
- Subfamily: Condicinae
- Genus: Kenrickodes; Viette, 1961

= Kenrickodes =

Genus of moths

Kenrickodes is a genus of moths of the family Noctuidae described by Viette in 1961. The species are known from Madagascar.

== Species ==
- Kenrickodes griseata (Kenrick, 1917)
- Kenrickodes michauxi Viette, 1968
- Kenrickodes pauliani Viette, 1965
- Kenrickodes rubidata (Kenrick, 1917)
- Kenrickodes semiumbrosa (Saalmüller, 1891)
- Kenrickodes titanica (Hampson, 1910)
- Kenrickodes toulgoeti Viette, 1965
- Kenrickodes transcursa (Saalmüller, 1891)
