= Plusilla =

Scientific classification
- Domain: Eukaryota
- Kingdom: Animalia
- Phylum: Arthropoda
- Class: Insecta
- Order: Lepidoptera
- Superfamily: Noctuoidea
- Family: Noctuidae
- Subfamily: Condicinae
- Genus: Plusilla; Staudinger, 1892
- Species: P. rosalia

Binomial name
- Plusilla rosalia Staudinger, 1892

Genus of moths

Plusilla is a monotypic moth genus of the family Noctuidae. Its only species, Plusilla rosalia, is found in south-east Siberia, Korea and Japan. Both the genus and species were first described by Staudinger in 1892.
