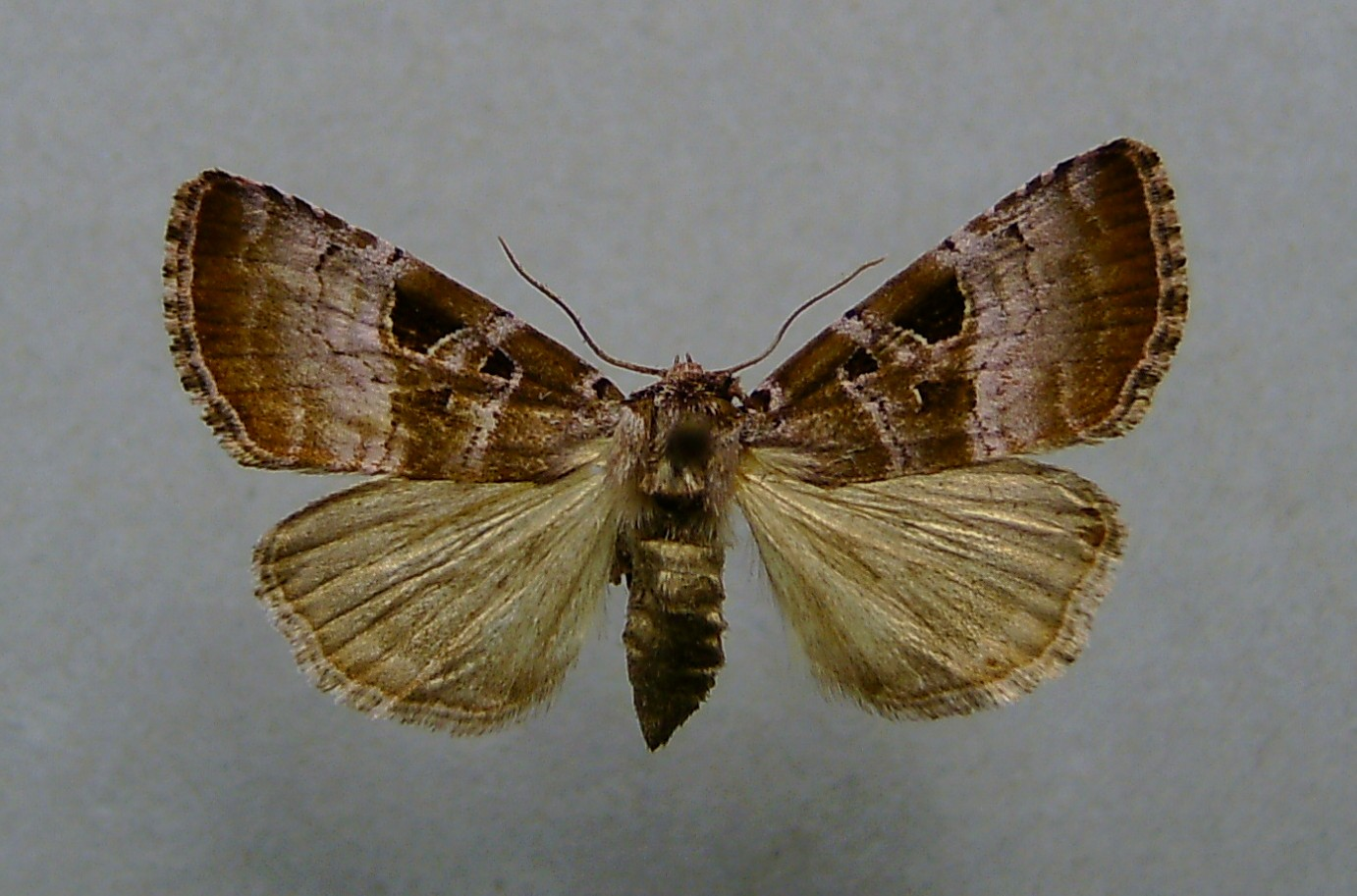

Scientific classification
- Kingdom: Animalia
- Phylum: Arthropoda
- Class: Insecta
- Order: Lepidoptera
- Superfamily: Noctuoidea
- Family: Noctuidae
- Genus: Eucarta
- Species: E. amethystina

Binomial name
- Eucarta amethystina (Hübner, 1803)

Synonyms
- Noctua amethystina Hubner, 1803; Telesilla austera Warren, 1911

= Eucarta amethystina =

Species of moth

Eucarta amethystina is a moth in the family Noctuidae first described by Jacob Hübner in 1803. It is found in central Europe, east to Belarus, through the Ural to the Pacific Ocean.

The wingspan is 28–34 mm.

== Technical description and variation ==
T. amethystina Hbn. (44 f). Forewing olive green suffused with rosy pink; the olive tints predominant in basal half of wing and along termen; basal and inner lines dark olive, edged with rosy pink, the former outwardly, the latter inwardly; outer line dark olive, dentate lunulate, almost lost in the rosy suffusion; stigmata rosy pink inlined with olive, the claviform and orbicular with white annuli, all 3 connected by a wedge-shaped pink mark below median, often suffused with olive; cell and space below it deep dark olive; submarginal line pinkish, indented on each fold; fringe olive and pink; hindwing pale grey, suffused with fuscous olive.; — the East Asiatic form, — subsp. austera subsp. nov. (44 f), — differs from the European in being much more sombre, the olive shading being stronger and greyer, and the rosy tints duller. — Larva green; dorsal line yellowish edged with deep green; subdorsal lines white; spiracular line broad, yellowish, sometimes tinged with red; spiracles black; feeding on the lower leaves of wild carrot and parsley.

== Biology ==
Adults are on wing from June to August.

The larvae feed on Apiaceae species, including Laser trilobum, Silaum silaus, Peucedanum officinale and Daucus carota. Full-grown larvae are green. The species overwinters in the pupal stage.
