= Dysmilichia =

Scientific classification
- Domain: Eukaryota
- Kingdom: Animalia
- Phylum: Arthropoda
- Class: Insecta
- Order: Lepidoptera
- Superfamily: Noctuoidea
- Family: Noctuidae
- Subfamily: Condicinae
- Genus: Dysmilichia

Genus of moths

Dysmilichia is a genus of moths of the family Noctuidae.

== Species ==
- Dysmilichia fukudai
- Dysmilichia gemella
- Dysmilichia namibiae Hacker, 2007
