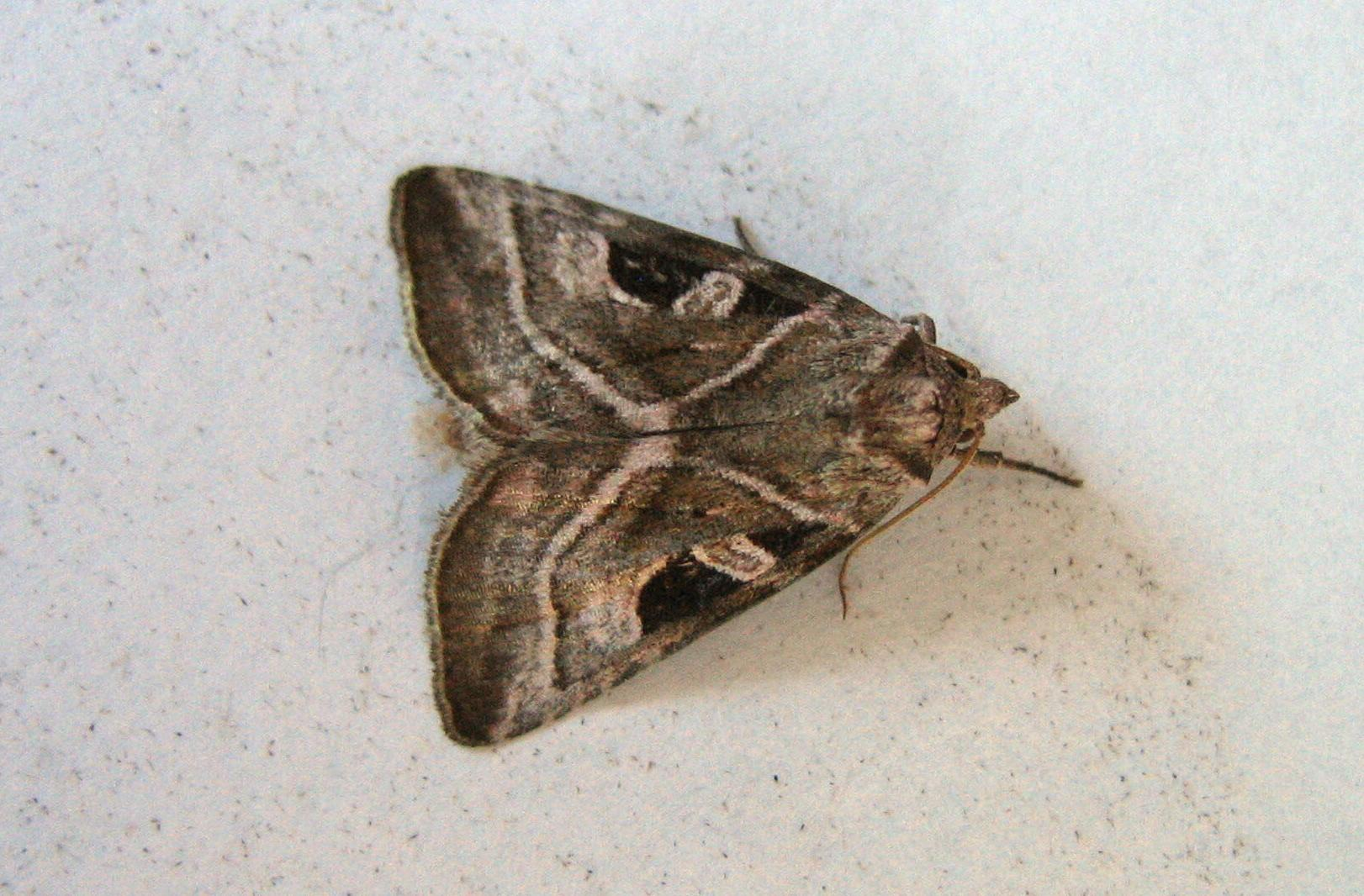

Scientific classification
- Domain: Eukaryota
- Kingdom: Animalia
- Phylum: Arthropoda
- Class: Insecta
- Order: Lepidoptera
- Superfamily: Noctuoidea
- Family: Noctuidae
- Subfamily: Condicinae
- Genus: Eucarta; Lederer, 1857

= Eucarta =

Genus of moths

Eucarta is a genus of moths of the family Noctuidae. The genus was erected by Julius Lederer in 1857.

== Species ==
- Eucarta actides (Staudinger, 1888)
- Eucarta amethystina (Hübner, [1803])
- Eucarta arcta (Lederer, 1853)
- Eucarta curiosa (Draudt, 1950)
- Eucarta fasciata (Butler, 1878)
- Eucarta fuscomaculata (Bremer & Grey, 1853)
- Eucarta griseata (Leech, 1900)
- Eucarta virgo (Treitschke, 1835) - silvery gem
