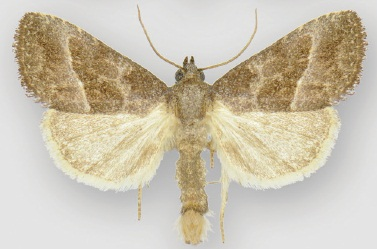
- Female
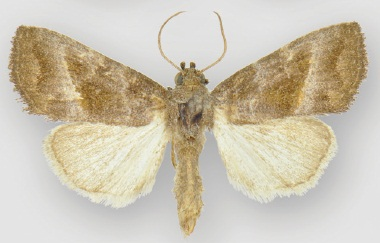
- Male

Scientific classification
- Domain: Eukaryota
- Kingdom: Animalia
- Phylum: Arthropoda
- Class: Insecta
- Order: Lepidoptera
- Superfamily: Noctuoidea
- Family: Noctuidae
- Genus: Ogdoconta
- Species: O. altura

Binomial name
- Ogdoconta altura Barnes, 1904

= Ogdoconta altura =

Species of moth

Ogdoconta altura is a moth in the family Noctuidae first described by William Barnes in 1904. It is found in south-central and southern Texas, as well as in north eastern Mexico.

The length of the forewings is 9.5–13 mm. The overall coloration of the adults is brown with a green-gray cast. The hindwing of the female is more heavily suffused with brown than the male, although the amount of dark suffusion is variable among males. Adults have been recorded on wing in April, May, July, August and September.
