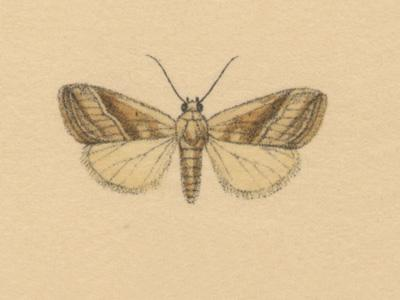
- Micrathetis dasarada

Scientific classification
- Kingdom: Animalia
- Phylum: Arthropoda
- Class: Insecta
- Order: Lepidoptera
- Superfamily: Noctuoidea
- Family: Noctuidae
- Tribe: Condicini
- Genus: Micrathetis; Hampson, 1908

= Micrathetis =

Genus of moths

Micrathetis is a genus of moths of the family Noctuidae. The genus was erected by George Hampson in 1908.

== Species ==
- Micrathetis canifimbria (Walker, 1866)
- Micrathetis costiplaga (Smith, 1908)
- Micrathetis dasarada (Druce, 1898)
- Micrathetis tecnion Dyar, 1914
- Micrathetis triplex (Walker, 1857)
