= Prospalta =

Scientific classification
- Kingdom: Animalia
- Phylum: Arthropoda
- Class: Insecta
- Order: Lepidoptera
- Superfamily: Noctuoidea
- Family: Noctuidae
- Subfamily: Condicinae
- Genus: Prospalta; Walker, 1858

Genus of moths

Prospalta is a genus of moths of the family Noctuidae. The genus was erected by Francis Walker in 1858.

== Species ==
- Prospalta atricupreoides Draeseke, 1928
- Prospalta contigua Leech, 1900
- Prospalta coptica Wiltshire, 1948
- Prospalta cyclina Hampson
- Prospalta definita Warren, 1914
- Prospalta enigmatica Turati & Krüger, 1936
- Prospalta immatura Warren, 1914
- Prospalta leucospila Walker, [1858]
- Prospalta ochrisquamata Warren, 1912
- Prospalta pallidipennis Warren, 1912
- Prospalta parva Leech, 1900
- Prospalta siderea Leech, 1900
- Prospalta stellata Moore, 1882
- Prospalta subalbida Warren, 1914
- Prospalta xylocola Strand, 1920
