= Diastema tigris =

Scientific classification
- Kingdom: Animalia
- Phylum: Arthropoda
- Class: Insecta
- Order: Lepidoptera
- Superfamily: Noctuoidea
- Family: Noctuidae
- Genus: Diastema
- Species: D. tigris

Binomial name
- Diastema tigris Guenée, 1852

Synonyms
- Nipista lineata Walker, [1858]

Species of moth

Diastema tigris, the lantana moth or lantana control moth, is a moth of the family Noctuidae. The species was first described by Achille Guenée in 1852. It is endemic to the US states of Florida and Texas, but has been introduced in Zambia, Australia, Micronesia, Fiji, Hawaii, Ghana, St. Helena, Tanzania, Uganda and Mauritius. as biological control of Lantana camara.

The wingspan is about 25 mm.

The larvae feed on Lantana camara.
