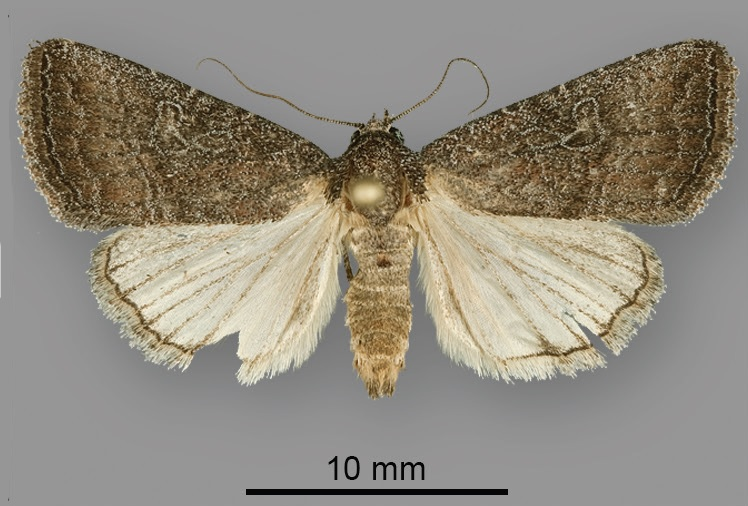

Scientific classification
- Domain: Eukaryota
- Kingdom: Animalia
- Phylum: Arthropoda
- Class: Insecta
- Order: Lepidoptera
- Superfamily: Noctuoidea
- Family: Noctuidae
- Genus: Ogdoconta
- Species: O. margareta

Binomial name
- Ogdoconta margareta Crabo, 2015

= Ogdoconta margareta =

Species of moth

Ogdoconta margareta is a moth in the family Noctuidae. It is found in south-eastern Arizona and Sonora in Mexico.

The length of the forewings is about 13 mm. The forewings are covered with brown-grey, off-white, and fawn scales, appearing hoary purplish brown, slightly darker grey medial to the subterminal line and terminal area and slightly paler near the postmedial line. The basal and antemedial lines are nearly obsolete, evident as a few pale scales on the costa and in the fold and the medial shade is dark grey, faint and diffuse, while the postmedial line is brown grey, double with filling of the adjacent ground color, the outer portion weakly dentate with dark and pale scales on the veins lateral to the line, oriented parallel to outer margin, nearly straight. The subterminal line consists of a hoary sinuous row of pale scales. The terminal line dark brown bordered mesially by an incomplete line of pale scales. The hindwings are slightly brownish off white with a slight dusting of pale grey scales near the anterior margin and darker grey veins. Adults have been recorded on wing in early September.

== Etymology ==
The species is named after the mother of the author.
