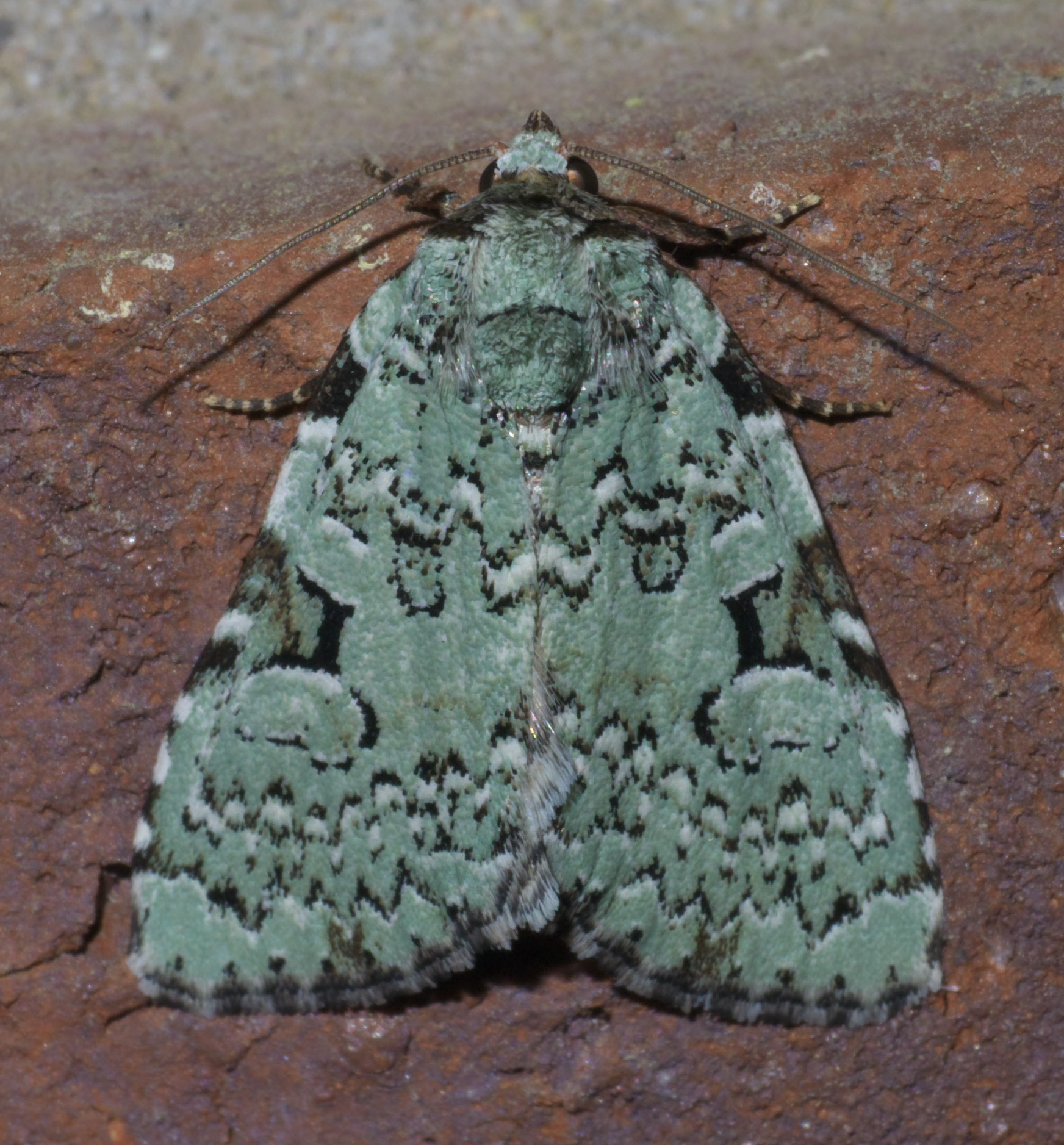
- Leuconycta diphteroides

Scientific classification
- Kingdom: Animalia
- Phylum: Arthropoda
- Class: Insecta
- Order: Lepidoptera
- Superfamily: Noctuoidea
- Family: Noctuidae
- Tribe: Leuconyctini
- Genus: Leuconycta; Hampson, 1909

Synonyms
- Bryocodia Hampson, 1910

= Leuconycta =

Genus of moths

Leuconycta is a genus of moths of the family Noctuidae. The genus was first described by George Hampson in 1909.

== Species ==
- Leuconycta diphteroides (Guenée, 1852)
- Leuconycta lepidula (Grote, 1874)
- Leuconycta vesta (Schaus, 1894)
