= Stibaera =

Scientific classification
- Kingdom: Animalia
- Phylum: Arthropoda
- Class: Insecta
- Order: Lepidoptera
- Superfamily: Noctuoidea
- Family: Noctuidae
- Tribe: Condicini
- Genus: Stibaera; Walker, 1857

Genus of moths

Stibaera is a genus of moths of the family Noctuidae. The genus was erected by Francis Walker in 1857.

== Species ==
- Stibaera albisparsana Hampson, 1926
- Stibaera costiplaga Walker, 1857
- Stibaera curvilineata Hampson, 1924
- Stibaera dentilineata Hampson, 1926
- Stibaera hersilia (H. Druce, 1889)
- Stibaera minor Draudt & Gaede, 1944
- Stibaera myrina (Möschler, 1880)
- Stibaera thyatiroides (Barnes & Benjamin, 1924)
