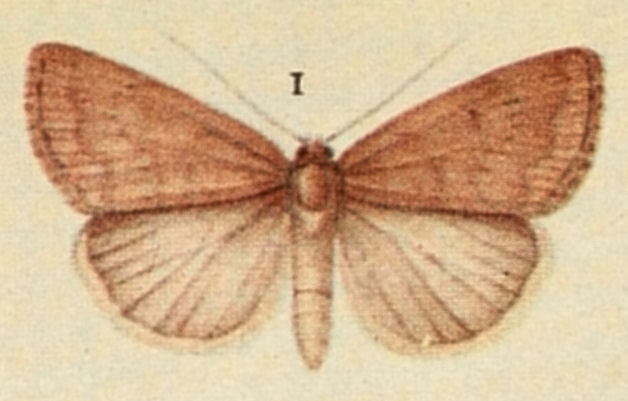

Scientific classification
- Domain: Eukaryota
- Kingdom: Animalia
- Phylum: Arthropoda
- Class: Insecta
- Order: Lepidoptera
- Superfamily: Noctuoidea
- Family: Noctuidae
- Genus: Acosmetia
- Species: A. caliginosa

Binomial name
- Acosmetia caliginosa (Hübner, 1813)

Synonyms
- Noctua caliginosa Hübner, 1813; Anthophila litorea Freyer, 1845; Acosmetia aquatilis Guenée, 1852; Acosmetia tristis Teich, 1896

= Acosmetia caliginosa =

Species of moth

Acosmetia caliginosa, the reddish buff, is a moth of the family Noctuidae. The species was first described by Jacob Hübner in 1813. It is found throughout continental Europe and in southern Scandinavia. then east across the Palearctic to Siberia.

In Britain it is rare and has protected status, being possibly confined to a single site on the Isle of Wight.

== Technical description and variation ==
Its forewings are brownish grey frosted with paler dusting; the inner and outer lines dark, the inner outwardly curved; the outer waved and dentate, indented above and below middle, the teeth forming a second line beyond the first; stigmata pale, very obscure; a pale waved submarginal line inwardly shaded with brown; hindwing silky grey, darker towards termen; — the form aquatilis Guen., from Asia, is paler, the forewing yellowish grey. Larva sap green with the segmental incisions yellow; the lines white, slender. The wingspan is 23–30 mm: females are smaller than males.

== Biology ==
The moth flies in June and July.

The larvae feed on saw-wort (Serratula tinctoria).
