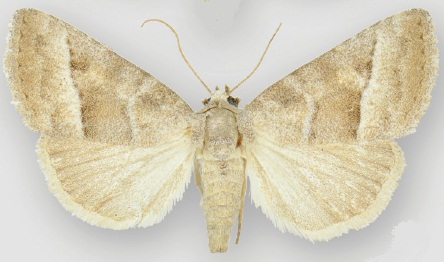
- Female
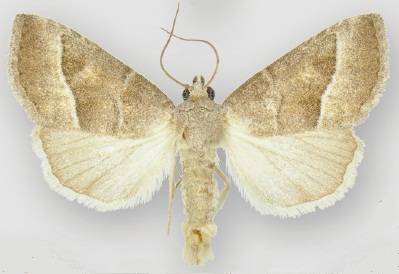
- Male

Scientific classification
- Domain: Eukaryota
- Kingdom: Animalia
- Phylum: Arthropoda
- Class: Insecta
- Order: Lepidoptera
- Superfamily: Noctuoidea
- Family: Noctuidae
- Genus: Ogdoconta
- Species: O. moreno

Binomial name
- Ogdoconta moreno Barnes, 1907

= Ogdoconta moreno =

Species of moth

Ogdoconta moreno is a moth in the family Noctuidae first described by William Barnes in 1907. It is only known from southern Arizona in the US, although its distribution likely extends into Mexico.

The length of the forewings is 10–14 mm. Adults vary from brown to gray. Both the reniform and orbicular spots of the forewing are represented by contrasting light patches devoid of any defining lines or spots. The orbicular spot touches the antemedial line. The antemedial line is angled with the outward apex occurring just below the orbicular spot. The inner side of the antemedial line is a light band followed by a darker brown line. The postmedial line is an almost straight, light line, followed by a light tan or gray region of the subterminal area, which gradually becomes darker in the subterminal area. The hindwings of both the male and female are whitish, suffused with dull gray brown, more heavily in the female than the male. Adults have been recorded on wing in July, August and September.
