= Diastema (moth) =

Scientific classification
- Kingdom: Animalia
- Phylum: Arthropoda
- Class: Insecta
- Order: Lepidoptera
- Superfamily: Noctuoidea
- Family: Noctuidae
- Tribe: Leuconyctini
- Genus: Diastema; Guenée, 1852

Synonyms
- Nipista Walker, [1858]

Genus of moths

Diastema is a genus of moths of the family Noctuidae. The genus was erected by Achille Guenée in 1852.

== Species ==
- Diastema argillophora Dyar, 1914
- Diastema cnossia H. Druce, 1889
- Diastema dosceles Dyar, 1918
- Diastema lineata
- Diastema morata Schaus, 1894
- Diastema multigutta Felder & Rogenhofer, 1874
- Diastema panteles Dyar, 1913
- Diastema tigris Guenée, 1852
