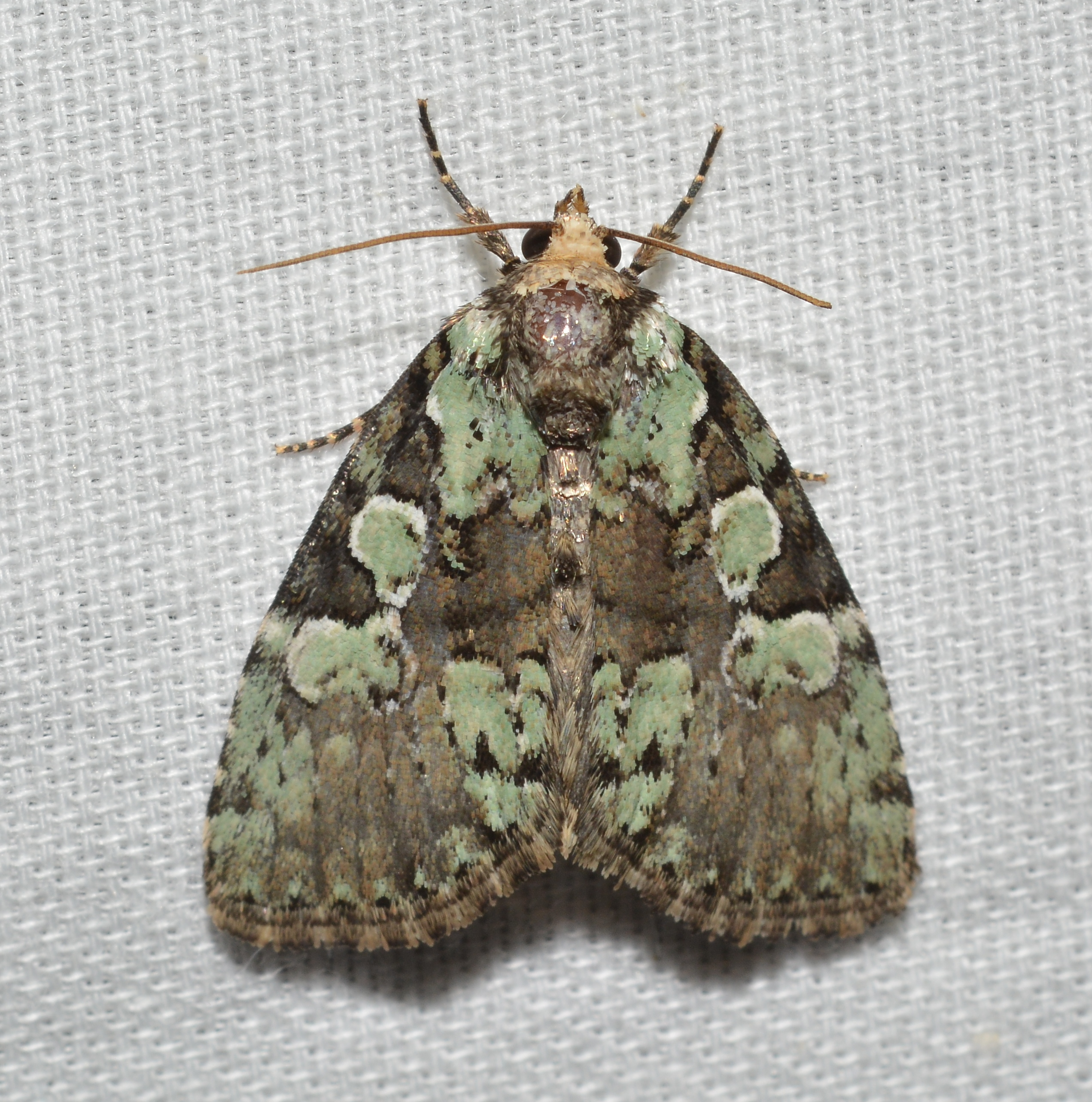

Scientific classification
- Kingdom: Animalia
- Phylum: Arthropoda
- Class: Insecta
- Order: Lepidoptera
- Superfamily: Noctuoidea
- Family: Noctuidae
- Genus: Leuconycta
- Species: L. lepidula

Binomial name
- Leuconycta lepidula (Grote, 1874)

Synonyms
- Jaspidia lepidula Grote, 1874; Bryophila lepidula; Bryophila avirida Smith, 1906; Leuconycta lepidula avirida

= Leuconycta lepidula =

Species of moth

Leuconycta lepidula, the marbled-green leuconycta moth, marbled-green jaspidia or dark leuconycta, is a moth of the family Noctuidae. The species was first described by Augustus Radcliffe Grote in 1874. It is found in North America from Nova Scotia to North Carolina, west to Texas and north to Alberta.

The wingspan is about 30 mm. Adults are on wing from May to August in one generation per year.

The larvae feed on Taraxacum species, including Taraxacum officinale (common dandelion).
