= Hemicephalis =

Scientific classification
- Domain: Eukaryota
- Kingdom: Animalia
- Phylum: Arthropoda
- Class: Insecta
- Order: Lepidoptera
- Superfamily: Noctuoidea
- Family: Noctuidae
- Subfamily: Condicinae
- Genus: Hemicephalis; Möschler, 1890

Synonyms
- Pseudohemiceras Möschler, 1890

Genus of moths

Hemicephalis is a genus of moths of the family Erebidae. The genus was erected by Heinrich Benno Möschler in 1890.

== Species ==
- Hemicephalis agenoria H. Druce, 1890
- Hemicephalis alesa H. Druce, 1890
- Hemicephalis characteria Stoll, [1790]
- Hemicephalis grandirena Schaus, 1915
- Hemicephalis krugii Möschler, 1890
- Hemicephalis laronia H. Druce, 1890
- Hemicephalis paulina H. Druce, 1889
- Hemicephalis phoenicias Hampson, 1926
- Hemicephalis proserpina H. Druce, 1906
- Hemicephalis rufipes Felder & Rogenhofer, 1874
