= Perigea bahamica =

Scientific classification
- Kingdom: Animalia
- Phylum: Arthropoda
- Class: Insecta
- Order: Lepidoptera
- Superfamily: Noctuoidea
- Family: Noctuidae
- Genus: Perigea
- Species: P. bahamica

Binomial name
- Perigea bahamica Hampson, 1908

Species of moth

Perigea bahamica is a moth in the family Noctuidae. It is found on the Bahamas. The species was collected in Monroe County, Florida, in 2012.
