= Bagada (moth) =

Scientific classification
- Kingdom: Animalia
- Phylum: Arthropoda
- Class: Insecta
- Order: Lepidoptera
- Superfamily: Noctuoidea
- Family: Noctuidae
- Subfamily: Condicinae
- Genus: Bagada; Walker, 1858

Genus of moths

Bagada is a genus of moths of the family Noctuidae.

== Species ==
- Bagada api Holloway, 1989
- Bagada cinnamomea (Roepke, 1938)
- Bagada fuscostrigata Bethune-Baker, 1906
- Bagada hilaris (Warren, 1912)
- Bagada labi Holloway, 1989
- Bagada lignigera (Walker, [1863])
- Bagada magna (Hampson, 1894)
- Bagada malayica (Snellen, [1886])
- Bagada ochracea (Warren, 1912)
- Bagada olivacea (Warren, 1912)
- Bagada ornata (Wileman & West, 1929)
- Bagada poliomera (Hampson, 1908)
- Bagada semirufa (Warren, 1912)
- Bagada spicea (Guenée, 1852)
- Bagada tricycla (Guenée, 1852)
- Bagada turpis (Warren, 1912)
