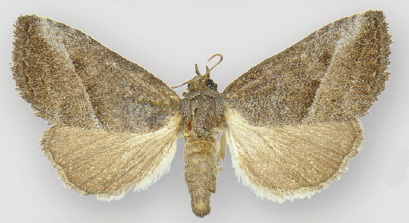
- Female
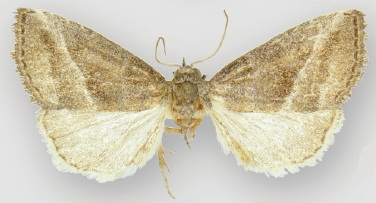
- Male

Scientific classification
- Domain: Eukaryota
- Kingdom: Animalia
- Phylum: Arthropoda
- Class: Insecta
- Order: Lepidoptera
- Superfamily: Noctuoidea
- Family: Noctuidae
- Genus: Ogdoconta
- Species: O. sexta

Binomial name
- Ogdoconta sexta Barnes & McDunnough, 1913

= Ogdoconta sexta =

Species of moth

Ogdoconta sexta is a moth in the family Noctuidae first described by William Barnes and James Halliday McDunnough in 1913. It is only known from Hidalgo and Cameron counties in the southernmost Texas. It is probably also found in Mexico.

The length of the forewings is 10.5–13 mm. There is a small streak of white scales from just before the apex of the wing to just below the outward angulation of the postmedial line. Giving the forewing costa a frosted appearance. Most of the maculation (spotting) of the forewing is obscure. However, the postmedial line is moderately distinct, straight, except for a slight basally directed angulation near the costa which is white or yellow. The hindwing is suffused with dull brown. Adults have been recorded on wing from March to June and again in September
