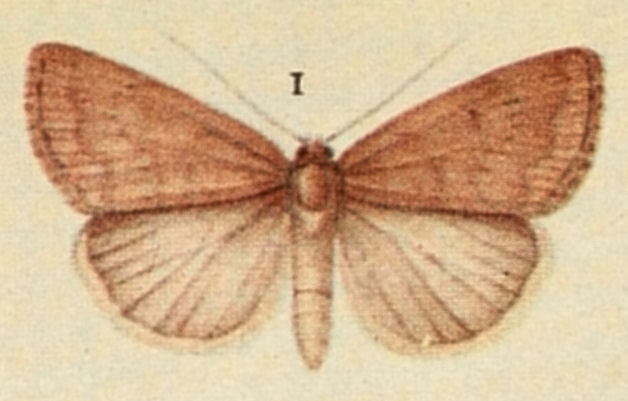
- Acosmetia caliginosa

Scientific classification
- Domain: Eukaryota
- Kingdom: Animalia
- Phylum: Arthropoda
- Class: Insecta
- Order: Lepidoptera
- Superfamily: Noctuoidea
- Family: Noctuidae
- Subfamily: Condicinae
- Genus: Acosmetia; Stephens, 1829

= Acosmetia =

Genus of insects

Acosmetia is a genus of moths of the family Noctuidae.

== Species ==
- Acosmetia arida de Joannis, 1909
- Acosmetia biguttula (Motschulsky, 1866)
- Acosmetia caliginosa (Hübner, [1813])
- Acosmetia chinensis (Wallengren, 1860)
- Acosmetia confusa (Wileman, 1915)
- Acosmetia malgassica Kenrick, 1917
- Acosmetia tenuipennis Hampson, 1909
