= Miyana =

Miyana may refer to:

- Miyana (community), a Muslim community in India
- Miyana (Pashtun tribe), extinct peoples of Mianishin Mountains of Afghanistan
- Miyana (Mexico City), a mixed-use development in Mexico City
- Miyana (butterfly), a genus of butterflies in the family Nymphalidae found in South East Asia
- Mianeh (Iran), a city in Iran sometimes spelled Miyana

== See also ==
- Miyan (disambiguation)
- Mianeh (disambiguation)
- Maliya Miyana Junction railway station, Gujarat, India
