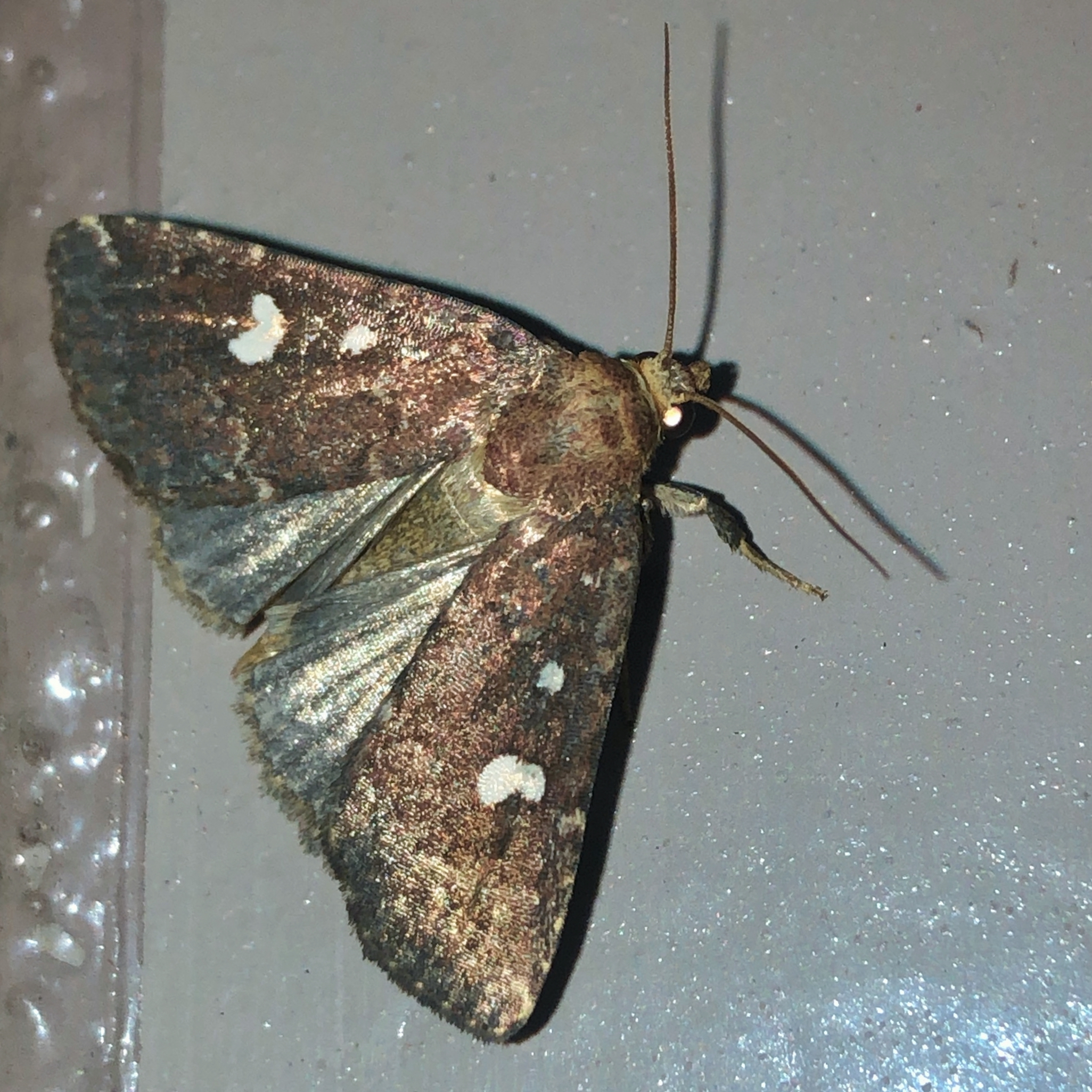

Scientific classification
- Domain: Eukaryota
- Kingdom: Animalia
- Phylum: Arthropoda
- Class: Insecta
- Order: Lepidoptera
- Superfamily: Noctuoidea
- Family: Noctuidae
- Subfamily: Condicinae
- Genus: Hadjina; Staudinger, 1892

Synonyms
- Aridagricola Shchetkin, 1965

= Hadjina =

Genus of moths

Hadjina is a genus of moths of the family Noctuidae. The genus was described by Staudinger in 1891.

== Species ==
- Hadjina atrinota Hampson, 1909
- Hadjina attinis Draudt, 1950
- Hadjina beata (Staudinger, 1895)
- Hadjina biguttula Motschulsky
- Hadjina carcaroda (Distant, 1901)
- Hadjina cinerea Hampson, 1909
- Hadjina cupreipennis (Moore, 1882)
- Hadjina eremita A. Bang-Haas, 1912
- Hadjina ferruginea Hampson, 1909
- Hadjina grisea (Hampson, 1891)
- Hadjina lutosa Staudinger, 1891
- Hadjina modestissima (Snellen, 1877)
- Hadjina obscura Hampson, 1918
- Hadjina palaestinensis (Staudinger, 1895)
- Hadjina pallida (Leech, 1900)
- Hadjina plumbeogrisea (Hampson, 1916)
- Hadjina poliastis (Hampson, 1907)
- Hadjina pyroxantha (Hampson, 1902)
- Hadjina radiata (Leech, 1900)
- Hadjina tyriobaphes Wiltshire, 1983
- Hadjina wichti (Hirschke, 1903)
