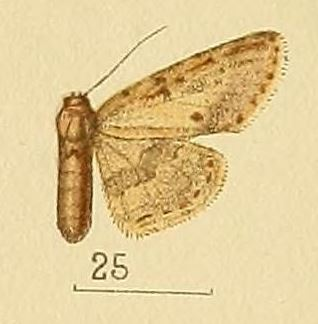

Scientific classification
- Kingdom: Animalia
- Phylum: Arthropoda
- Class: Insecta
- Order: Lepidoptera
- Superfamily: Noctuoidea
- Family: Noctuidae
- Genus: Kenrickodes
- Species: K. titanica

Binomial name
- Kenrickodes titanica (Hampson, 1910)

Synonyms
- Lithacodia titanica Hampson, 1910; Kenrickodes probata Viette, 1958

= Kenrickodes titanica =

Species of moth

Kenrickodes titanica is a species of moth in the family Noctuidae first described by George Hampson in 1910. It is found in central Madagascar and in South Africa.
