= Bagada spicea =

Scientific classification
- Kingdom: Animalia
- Phylum: Arthropoda
- Class: Insecta
- Order: Lepidoptera
- Superfamily: Noctuoidea
- Family: Noctuidae
- Genus: Bagada
- Species: B. spicea

Binomial name
- Bagada spicea (Guenée, 1852)

Synonyms
- Prospalta spicea Guenée, 1852; Perigea spicea Guenée, 1852; Bagada pyrochroma Walker, 1858

Species of moth

Bagada spicea is a moth of the family Noctuidae first described by Achille Guenée in 1852. It is found in Sri Lanka.
