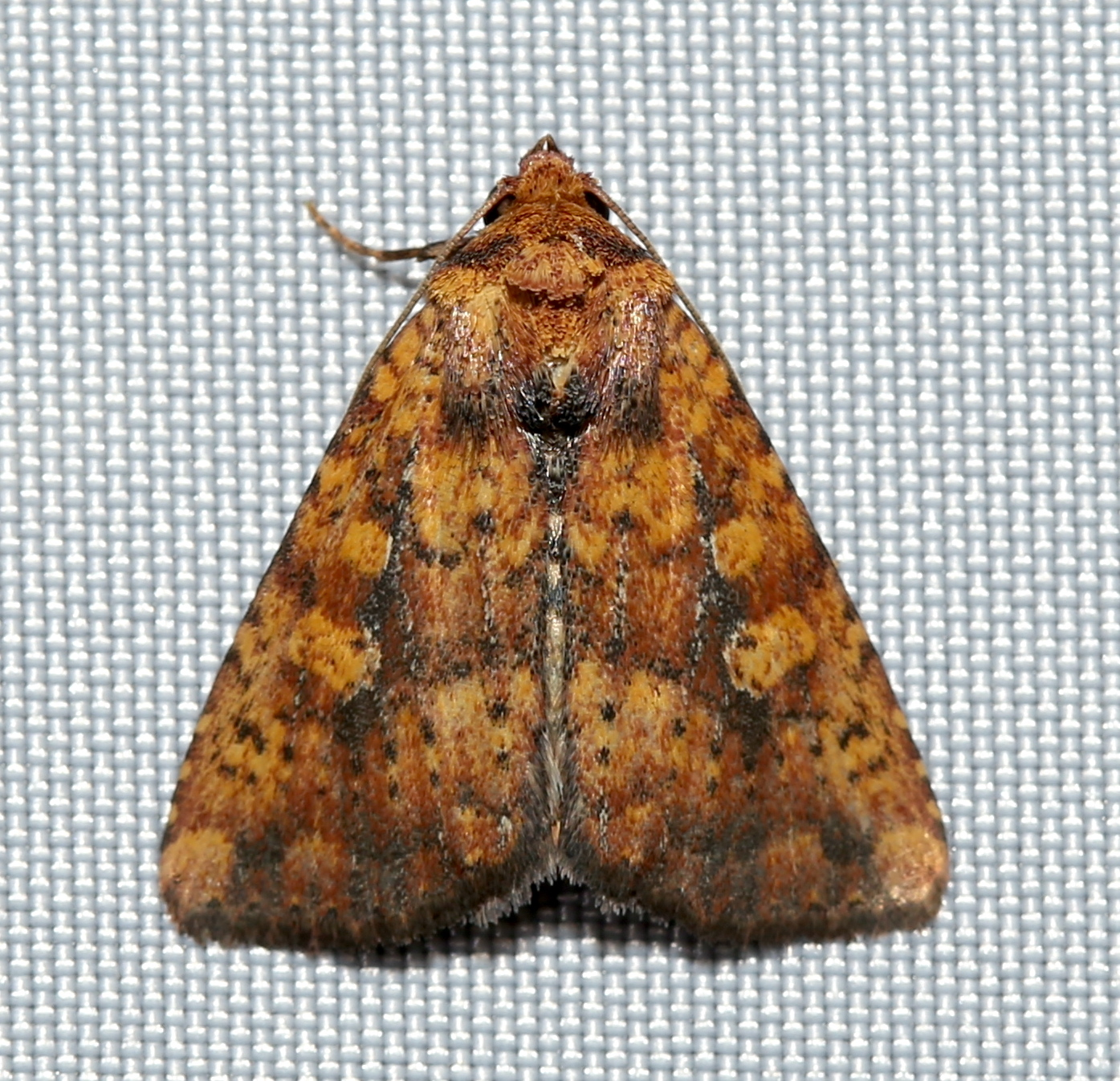

Scientific classification
- Kingdom: Animalia
- Phylum: Arthropoda
- Class: Insecta
- Order: Lepidoptera
- Superfamily: Noctuoidea
- Family: Noctuidae
- Genus: Perigea
- Species: P. xanthioides

Binomial name
- Perigea xanthioides Guenée, 1852

Synonyms
- Hadena trita Moschler, 1886; Perigea xanthioides enixa Grote, 1875

= Perigea xanthioides =

Species of insect

Perigea xanthioides, the red groundling moth or pied groundling moth, is a moth of the family Noctuidae. The species was first described by Achille Guenée in 1852. It is found from Canada to Brazil and on Jamaica. The wingspan is about 29 mm. The larvae feed on Vernonia and Eutrochium species.
