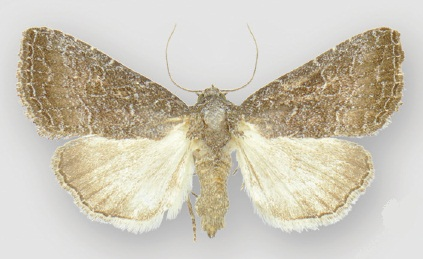
- Male
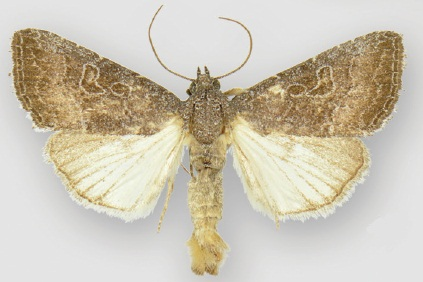
- Female

Scientific classification
- Domain: Eukaryota
- Kingdom: Animalia
- Phylum: Arthropoda
- Class: Insecta
- Order: Lepidoptera
- Superfamily: Noctuoidea
- Family: Noctuidae
- Genus: Ogdoconta
- Species: O. tacna

Binomial name
- Ogdoconta tacna (Barnes, 1904)

Synonyms
- Caradrina tacna Barnes, 1904

= Ogdoconta tacna =

Species of moth

Ogdoconta tacna is a moth in the family Noctuidae first described by William Barnes in 1904. It is found in the US in central and south-eastern Texas. It is probably also present in Mexico.

The length of the forewings is 11–13.5 mm. The forewings are gray brown with a slight greenish tint with a pattern of fine white lines and a light scattering of white scales. The orbicular and reniform spots are clearly outlined by fine, dirty-white lines. The postmedial line is mostly straight and oblique from the costa to the posterior margin, although there is a slight outward pointing angulation near the bottom of the reniform spot. The postmedial line is accented with vague dark gray-green rectangles on its inner side. The subterminal area is slightly lighter than the terminal area, and the subterminal line is irregular and dull white. The terminal line consists of a series of dark rectangles accented on their inner sides by white lines. The hindwing of the male is dirty white with dark scales along the fringe and a dusting of dark scales along the costal margin. The female hindwing is more generally suffused with dark scales. Adults have been recorded on wing in April and May and again in September and October.
