= Perigea pectinata =

Scientific classification
- Domain: Eukaryota
- Kingdom: Animalia
- Phylum: Arthropoda
- Class: Insecta
- Order: Lepidoptera
- Superfamily: Noctuoidea
- Family: Noctuidae
- Genus: Perigea
- Species: P. pectinata

Binomial name
- Perigea pectinata (Herrich-Schäffer, 1868)

Synonyms
- Galgula pectinata Herrich-Schäffer, 1868; Monodes cuprescens Hampson, 1909; Elaphria cuprescens

Species of moth

Perigea pectinata is a moth of the family Noctuidae. The species was first described by Gottlieb August Wilhelm Herrich-Schäffer in 1868. It is found on Cuba and the Dominican Republic.
