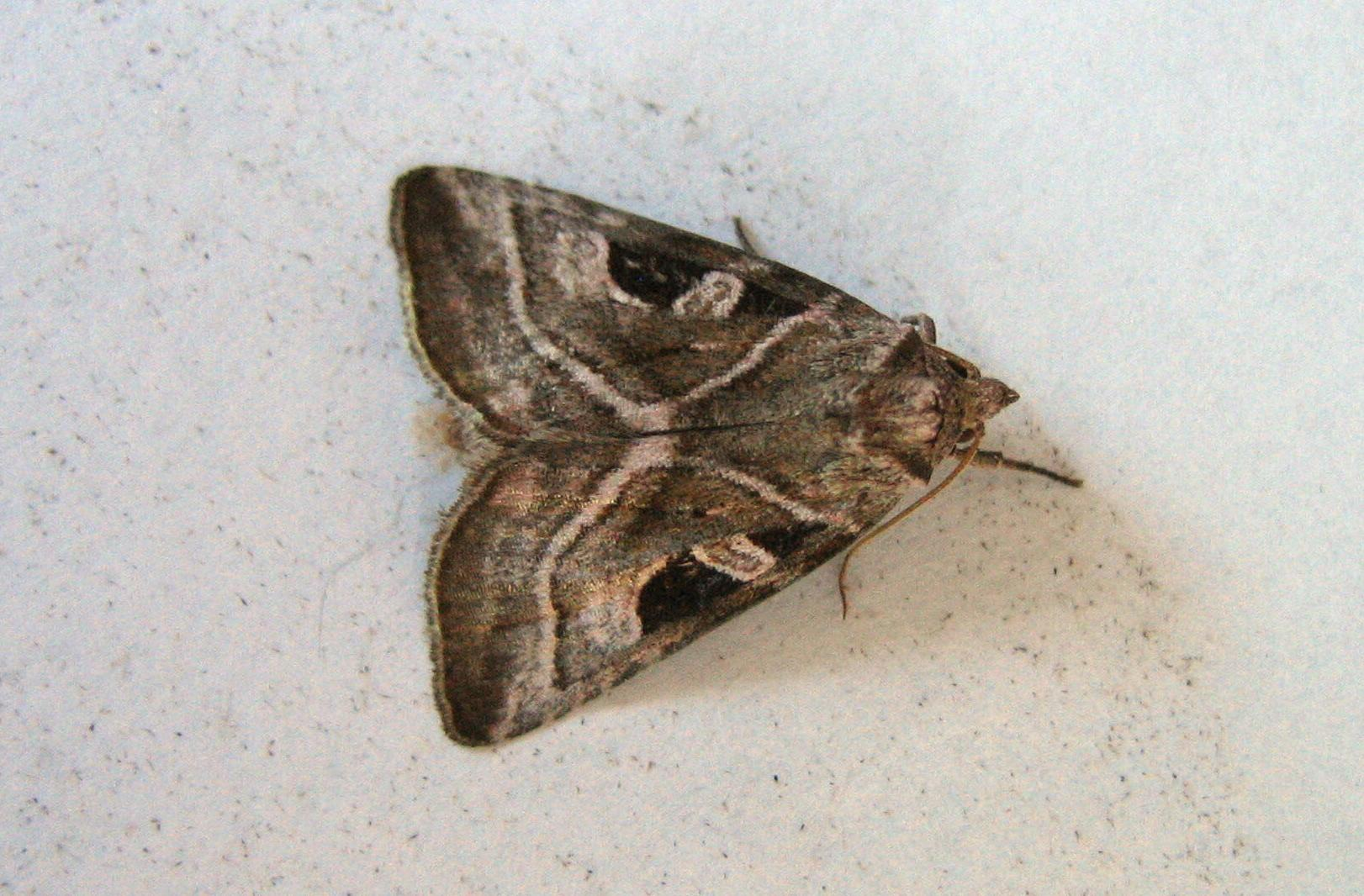

Scientific classification
- Domain: Eukaryota
- Kingdom: Animalia
- Phylum: Arthropoda
- Class: Insecta
- Order: Lepidoptera
- Superfamily: Noctuoidea
- Family: Noctuidae
- Genus: Eucarta
- Species: E. virgo

Binomial name
- Eucarta virgo (Treitschke, 1835)

= Eucarta virgo =

Species of moth

Eucarta virgo, the silvery gem, is a moth of the family Noctuidae. The species first described by Georg Friedrich Treitschke in 1835. It can be found in south, southeast and central Europe.

The wingspan is 25–36 mm.

The larvae feed on Artemisia vulgaris, Artemisia campestris and Tanacetum vulgare.
