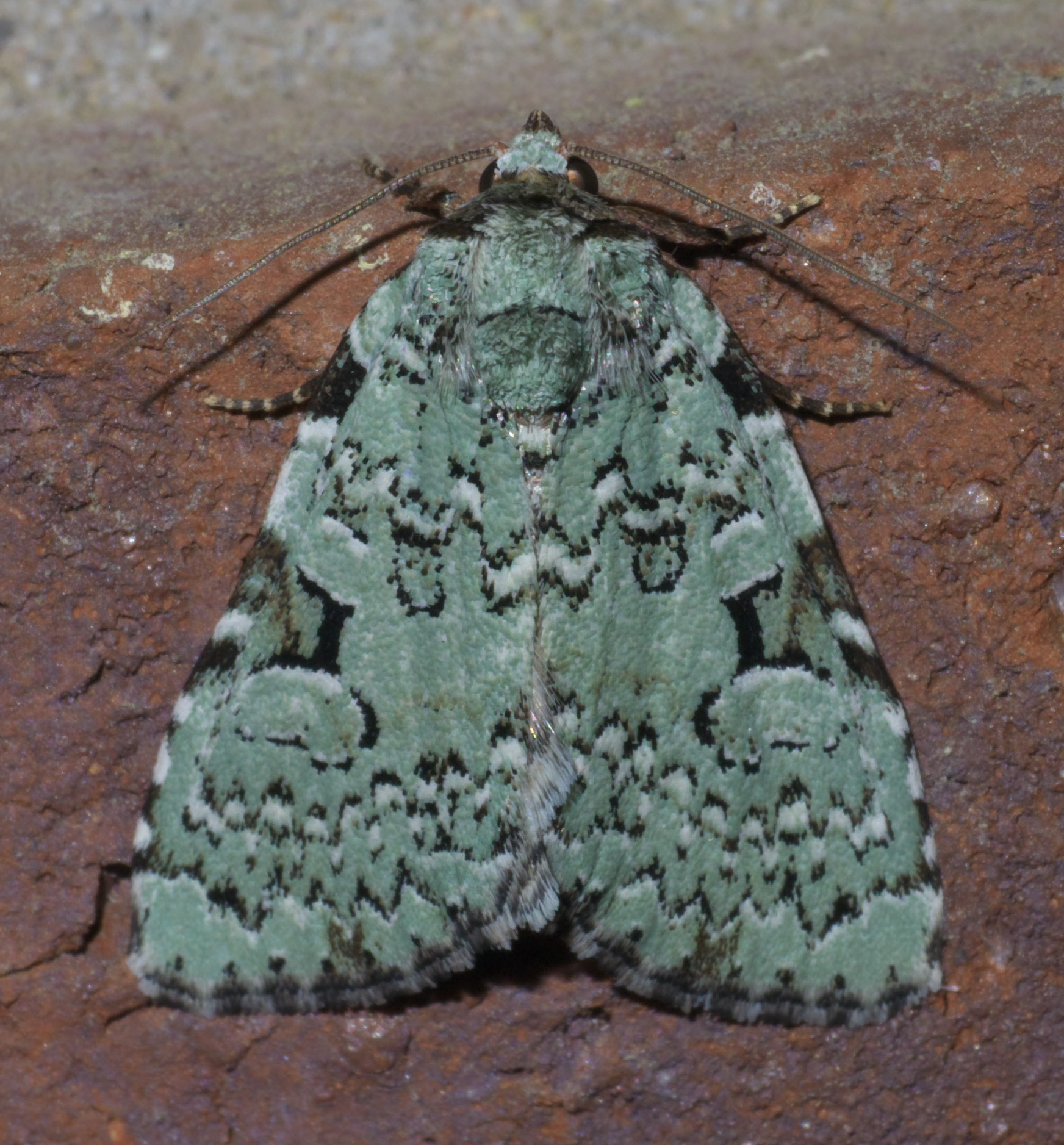
- Adult
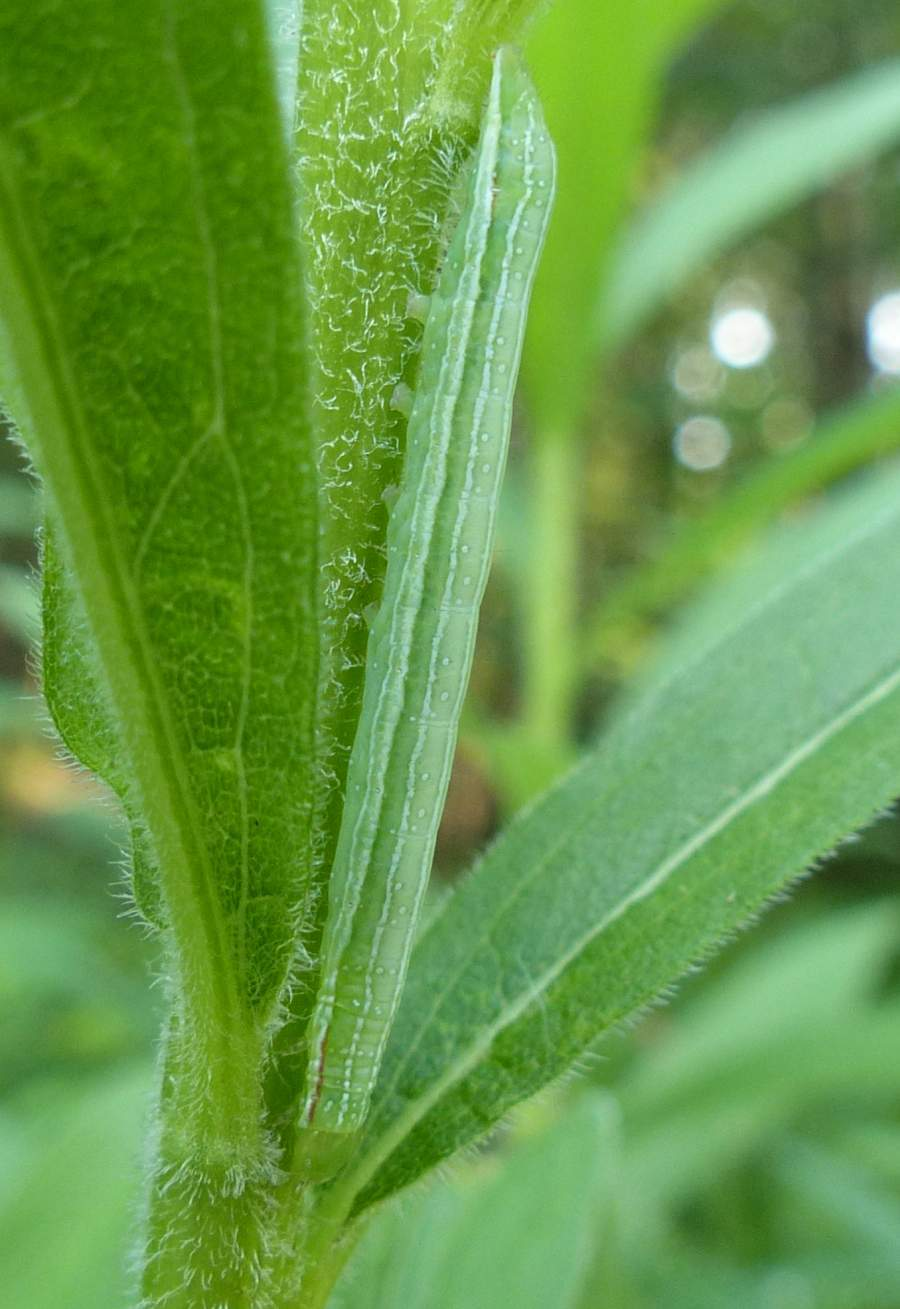
- Larva

Scientific classification
- Kingdom: Animalia
- Phylum: Arthropoda
- Class: Insecta
- Order: Lepidoptera
- Superfamily: Noctuoidea
- Family: Noctuidae
- Genus: Leuconycta
- Species: L. diphteroides

Binomial name
- Leuconycta diphteroides (Guenée, 1852)

Synonyms
- Microcoelia diphteroides Guenée, 1852; Leuconycta obliterata (Grote, 1864) (form)

= Leuconycta diphteroides =

Species of moth

Leuconycta diphteroides, the green leuconycta moth or green owlet, is a moth of the family Noctuidae. The species was first described by Achille Guenée in 1852. It is found in North America from Nova Scotia to Florida, west to Texas and north to Saskatchewan.

The wingspan is 27–32 mm. Adults are on wing from May to September.

The larvae feed on Solidago and Aster species.
