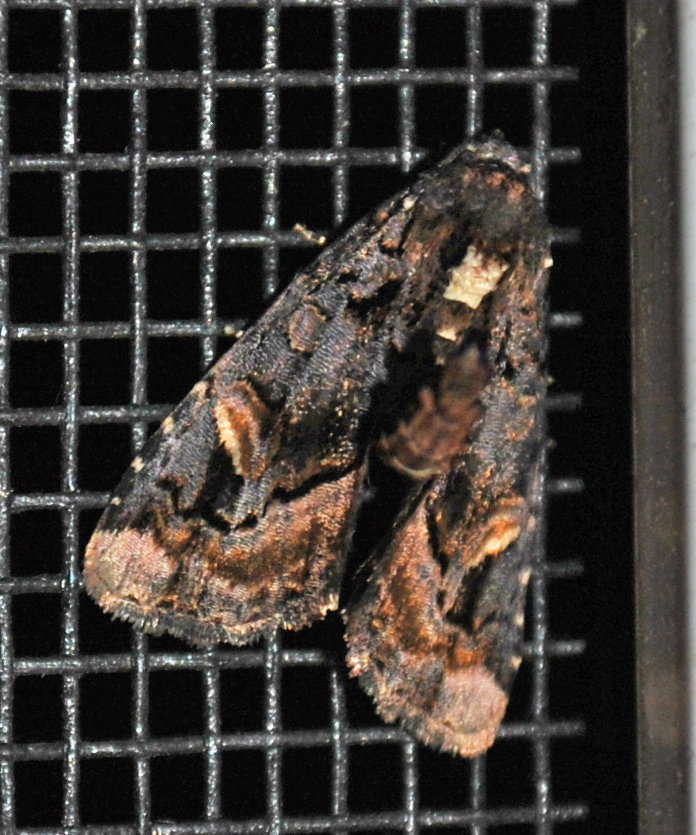
- Homophoberia apicosa

Scientific classification
- Domain: Eukaryota
- Kingdom: Animalia
- Phylum: Arthropoda
- Class: Insecta
- Order: Lepidoptera
- Superfamily: Noctuoidea
- Family: Noctuidae
- Tribe: Condicini
- Genus: Homophoberia; Morrison, 1875

Synonyms
- Neoerastria McDunnough, 1937

= Homophoberia =

Genus of moths

Homophoberia is a genus of moths of the family Noctuidae. The genus was erected by Herbert Knowles Morrison in 1875.

== Species ==
- Homophoberia apicosa (Haworth, 1809)
- Homophoberia cristata Morrison, 1875
