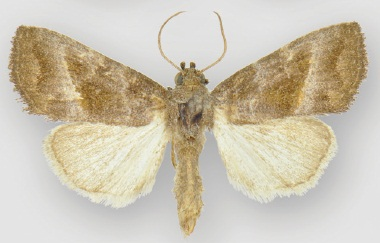
- Ogdoconta altura

Scientific classification
- Domain: Eukaryota
- Kingdom: Animalia
- Phylum: Arthropoda
- Class: Insecta
- Order: Lepidoptera
- Superfamily: Noctuoidea
- Family: Noctuidae
- Subfamily: Condicinae
- Genus: Ogdoconta; Butler, 1891

= Ogdoconta =

Genus of moths

Ogdoconta is a genus of moths of the family Noctuidae.

== Species ==
- Ogdoconta altura Barnes, 1904
- Ogdoconta cinereola (Guenée, 1852)
- Ogdoconta cymographa Hampson, 1910
- Ogdoconta fergusoni Metzler & Lafontaine, 2013
- Ogdoconta gamura Schaus, 1921
- Ogdoconta justitia Dyar, 1919
- Ogdoconta lilacina (Druce, 1890)
- Ogdoconta margareta Crabo, 2015
- Ogdoconta moreno Barnes, 1907
- Ogdoconta muscula (Schaus, 1898)
- Ogdoconta plumbea Dyar, 1912
- Ogdoconta pulverulenta Schaus, 1911
- Ogdoconta pulvilinea Schaus, 1911
- Ogdoconta rufipenna Metzler, Knudson & Poole, 2013
- Ogdoconta satana Meztler, Knudson & Poole, 2013
- Ogdoconta sexta Barnes & McDunnough, 1913
- Ogdoconta tacna (Barnes, 1904)
