= Pyrrhidivalva =

Scientific classification
- Kingdom: Animalia
- Phylum: Arthropoda
- Clade: Pancrustacea
- Class: Insecta
- Order: Lepidoptera
- Superfamily: Noctuoidea
- Family: Noctuidae
- Subfamily: Condicinae
- Genus: Pyrrhidivalva; Sugi in Inoue, Sugi, Kuroko, Moriuti & Kawabe, 1982
- Species: P. sordida

Binomial name
- Pyrrhidivalva sordida (Butler, 1881)

Synonyms
- Glottula sordida Butler, 1881; Gerbatha pseudodyops Butler, 1884; Segetia variegata Oberthür, 1884; Oligia sordida; Hampson, 1908

Genus of moths

Pyrrhidivalva is a monotypic moth genus of the family Noctuidae erected by Shigero Sugi. Its only species, Pyrrhidivalva sordida, was first described by Arthur Gardiner Butler in 1881. It is found in Amurland, Ussuri, Korea, Japan and Taiwan.
