= Perigea enixa =

Scientific classification
- Kingdom: Animalia
- Phylum: Arthropoda
- Clade: Pancrustacea
- Class: Insecta
- Order: Lepidoptera
- Superfamily: Noctuoidea
- Family: Noctuidae
- Genus: Perigea
- Species: P. enixa

Binomial name
- Perigea enixa Grote, 1875

Species of moth

Perigea enixa is a species of moth in the family Noctuidae (the owlet moths). It is found in North America.
