= Stibaera thyatiroides =

Scientific classification
- Domain: Eukaryota
- Kingdom: Animalia
- Phylum: Arthropoda
- Class: Insecta
- Order: Lepidoptera
- Superfamily: Noctuoidea
- Family: Noctuidae
- Genus: Stibaera
- Species: S. thyatiroides

Binomial name
- Stibaera thyatiroides (Barnes & Benjamin, 1924)

Species of moth

Stibaera thyatiroides, the whaleback moth, is a species of moth in the family Noctuidae (the owlets). It was first described by William Barnes and Foster Hendrickson Benjamin in 1924 and it is found in North America.

The MONA or Hodges number for Stibaera thyatiroides is 9716.
