= Mianeh-ye Jenjan =

Mianeh-ye Jenjan ميانه جنجان
- Village
- Location within Iran
- Coordinates: 30°13′53″N 51°27′50″E
- Country: Iran
- Province: Fars
- County: Mamasani
- Bakhsh: Central
- Rural District: Fahlian

Population (2006)
  - Total: 144
- Time zone: UTC+3:30 (IRST)
  - Summer (DST): UTC+4:30 (IRDT)

Mianeh-ye Jenjan (Persian: ميانه جنجان, also Romanized as Mīāneh-ye Jenjān; also known as Mīāneh) is a village in Fahlian Rural District, in the Central District of Mamasani County, Fars province, Iran. At the 2006 census, its population was 144, in 34 families.
