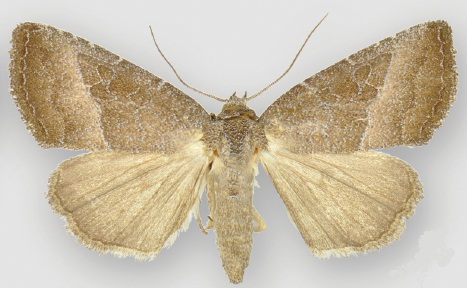
- Female
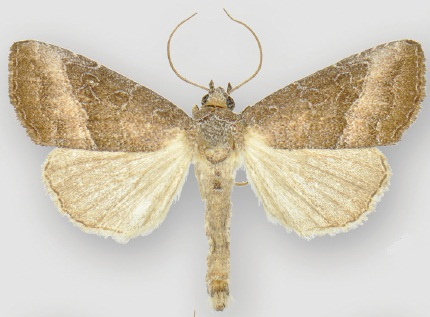
- Male

Scientific classification
- Kingdom: Animalia
- Phylum: Arthropoda
- Class: Insecta
- Order: Lepidoptera
- Superfamily: Noctuoidea
- Family: Noctuidae
- Genus: Ogdoconta
- Species: O. cinereola

Binomial name
- Ogdoconta cinereola (Guenée, 1852)

Synonyms
- Placodes cinereola Guenée, 1852; Miana atomaria Walker, 1865

= Ogdoconta cinereola =

Species of moth

Ogdoconta cinereola, the common pinkband moth, is a moth in the family Noctuidae. It is found in eastern, central, and south-western North America. It occurs from southern Ontario and Quebec south to southern Florida. At the western edge of its distribution, it occurs from Manitoba southward through the Great Plains of Nebraska and Iowa, south throughout most of Texas, and westward through southern New Mexico to south-eastern Arizona (Santa Cruz County). The distribution extends south to the state of Coahuila in northern Mexico.

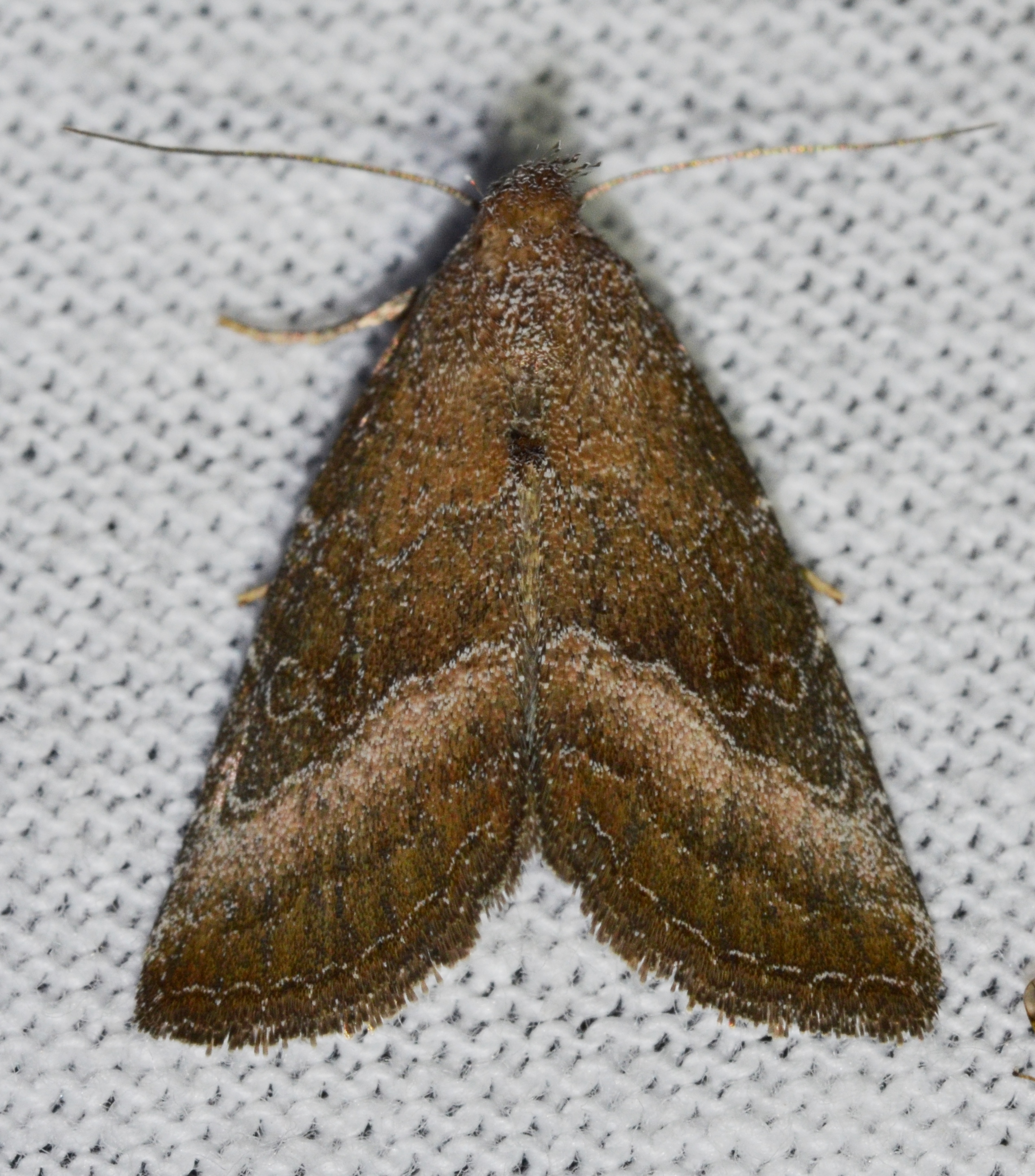

The length of the forewings is 9.5–14.5 mm. The forewing is light fuscous brown, and the subterminal region (between the postmedial and subterminal lines) is suffused with a pinkish tinge. The medial and basal areas are minutely speckled with white. The antemedial line is an obscure, scalloped white line. The reniform and orbicular spots are obscure but often discernible by fine white outlines. The claviform spot is absent. The postmedial line is a white, almost straight, oblique line with a slight basally directed bend. The subterminal line is marked primarily as a brown shade terminating the pink suffusion of the subterminal region. The hindwings are suffused with brown. Males and females are similar in appearance, although the female hindwing usually is darker. Adults are on wing from May to September in the northern part of the range and from April to October in Texas and Florida.

The larvae feed on Amaranthaceae, Asteraceae (especially Ambrosia species), Fabaceae, Labiatae and Poaceae species.
