= Miyaneh-ye Olya =

Miyaneh-ye Olya ميانه عليا
- Village
- Location within Iran
- Coordinates: 30°12′14″N 51°22′00″E
- Country: Iran
- Province: Fars
- County: Mamasani
- Bakhsh: Central
- Rural District: Bakesh-e Do

Population (2006)
  - Total: 172
- Time zone: UTC+3:30 (IRST)
  - Summer (DST): UTC+4:30 (IRDT)

Miyaneh-ye Olya (Persian: ميانه عليا, also Romanized as Mīyāneh-ye 'Olyā) is a village in Bakesh-e Do Rural District, in the Central District of Mamasani County, Fars province, Iran. At the 2006 census, its population was 172, in 39 families.
