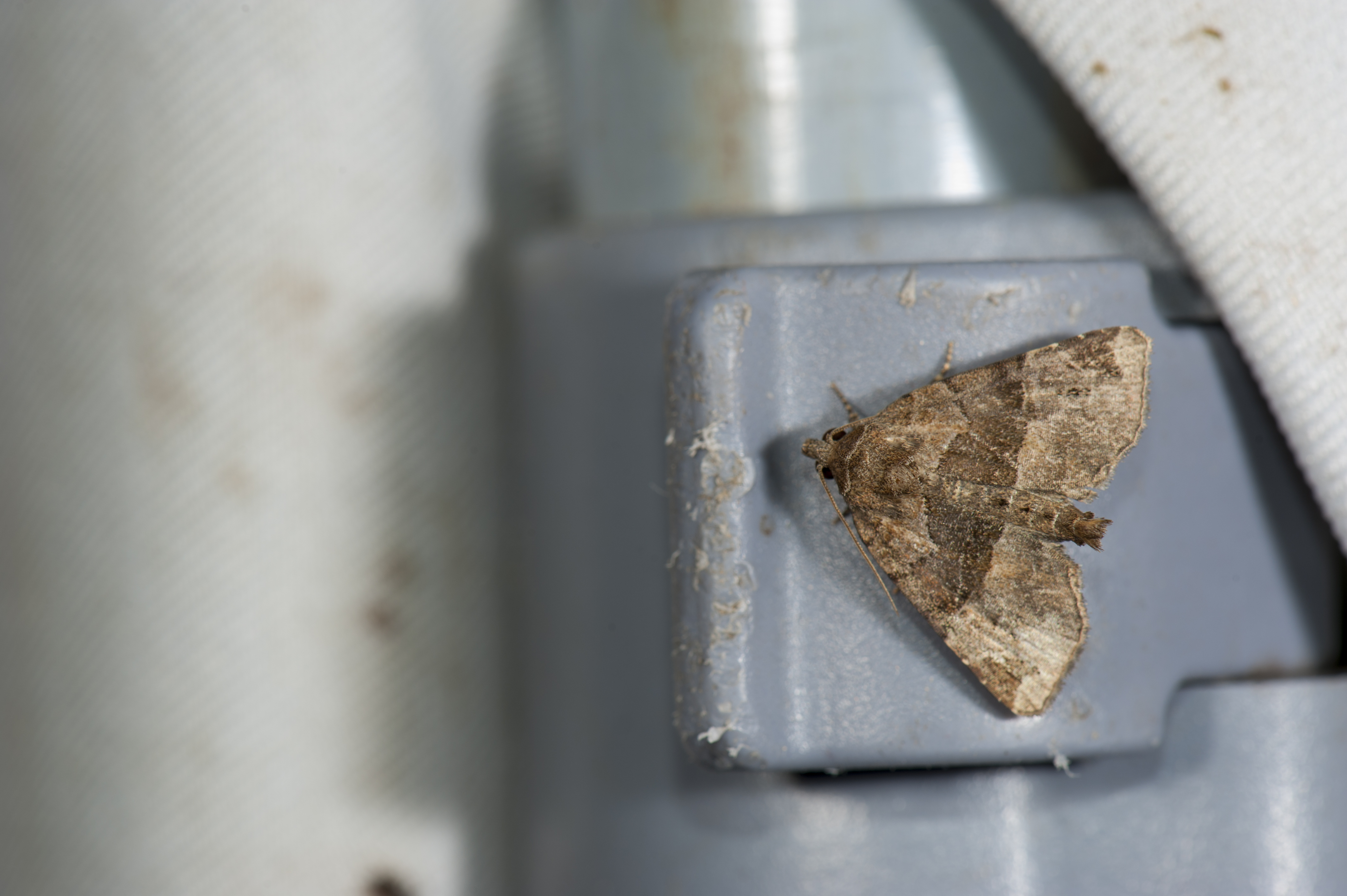

Scientific classification
- Kingdom: Animalia
- Phylum: Arthropoda
- Clade: Pancrustacea
- Class: Insecta
- Order: Lepidoptera
- Superfamily: Noctuoidea
- Family: Noctuidae
- Subfamily: Condicinae
- Genus: Niphonyx; Sugi in Inoue, Sugi, Kuroko, Moriuti & Kawabe, 1982
- Species: N. segregata

Binomial name
- Niphonyx segregata (Butler, 1878)

Synonyms
- Miana segregata Butler, 1878; Telesilla placens Staudinger, 1888

= Niphonyx =

Genus and species of moth

Niphonyx is a monotypic genus of moths in the family Noctuidae erected by Shigero Sugi in 1982. Its only species, Niphonyx segregata, the hops angleshade, was first described by Arthur Gardiner Butler in 1878. It is endemic to eastern Asia, including the Russian Far East, the Korean Peninsula, Japan, China and Taiwan. It was introduced to the north-eastern United States in the 1990s and is found from Connecticut south to at least Delaware.

The wingspan is 25–30 mm. There are two generations per year in North America.

The larvae feed on hop species.
