= Miyaneh-ye Sofla =

Miyaneh-ye Sofla ميانه سفلي
- Village
- Location within Iran
- Coordinates: 30°12′27″N 51°21′41″E
- Country: Iran
- Province: Fars
- County: Mamasani
- Bakhsh: Central
- Rural District: Bakesh-e Do

Population (2006)
  - Total: 382
- Time zone: UTC+3:30 (IRST)
  - Summer (DST): UTC+4:30 (IRDT)

Miyaneh-ye Sofla (Persian: ميانه سفلي, also Romanized as Mīyāneh-ye Soflá) is a village in Bakesh-e Do Rural District, in the Central District of Mamasani County, Fars province, Iran. At the 2006 census, its population was 382, in 77 families.
