= Mianeh, Fars =

Mianeh ميانه
- Village
- Location within Iran
- Coordinates: 30°15′38″N 51°24′39″E
- Country: Iran
- Province: Fars
- County: Rostam
- Bakhsh: Central
- Rural District: Rostam-e Yek

Population (2006)
  - Total: 66
- Time zone: UTC+3:30 (IRST)
  - Summer (DST): UTC+4:30 (IRDT)

Mianeh (Persian: ميانه, also Romanized as Mīāneh; also known as Mīāneh Bakhs) is a village in Rostam-e Yek Rural District, in the Central District of Rostam County, Fars province, Iran. At the 2006 census, its population was 66, in 13 families.
