= Mianeh, Kurdistan =

Mianeh ميانه
- Village
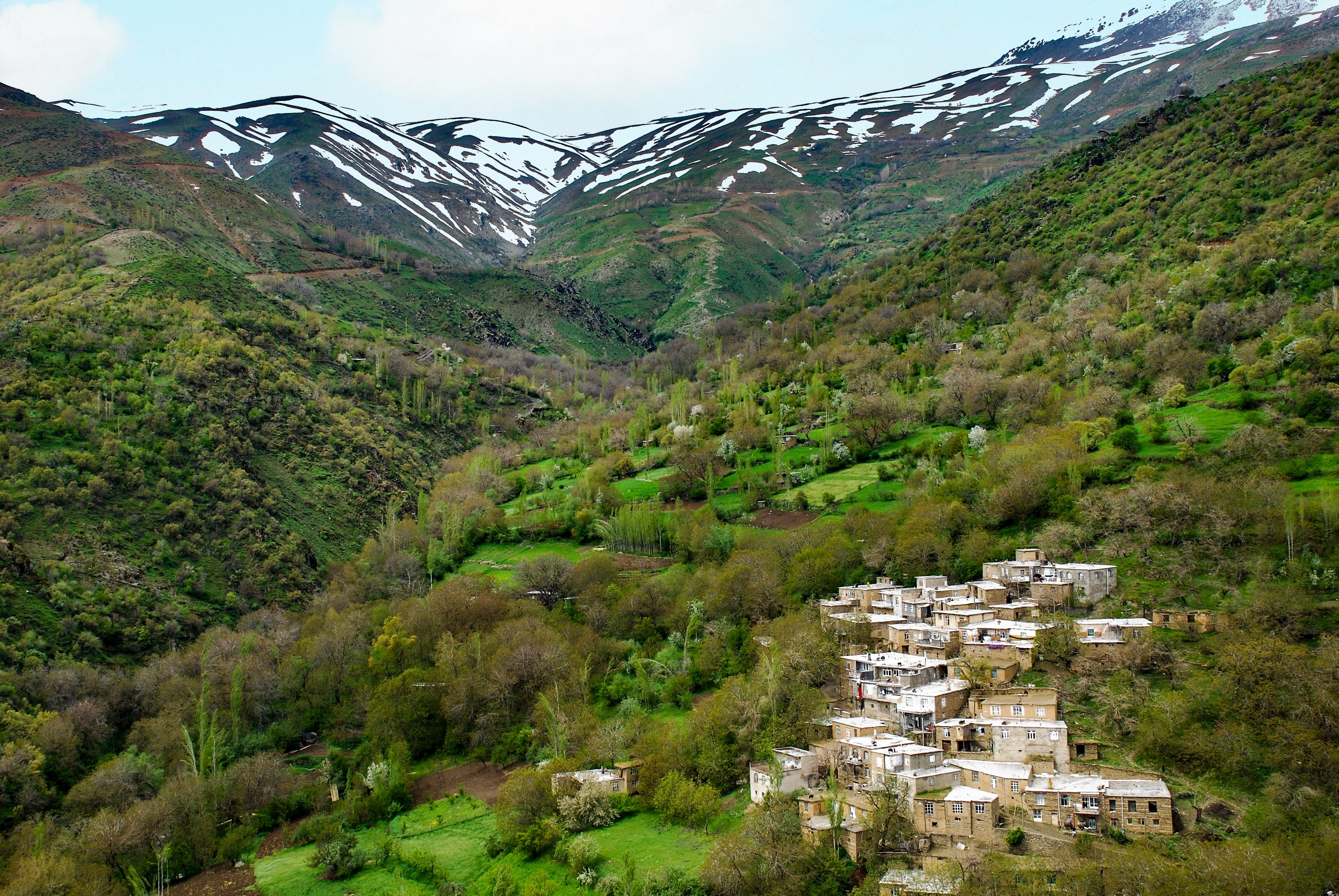

- Location within Iran
- Coordinates: 35°19′27″N 46°30′00″E
- Country: Iran
- Province: Kurdistan
- County: Sanandaj
- Bakhsh: Kalatrazan
- Rural District: Negel

Population (2006)
  - Total: 1,440
- Time zone: UTC+3:30 (IRST)
  - Summer (DST): UTC+4:30 (IRDT)

Mianeh (Persian: ميانه, also Romanized as Mīāneh) is a village in Negel Rural District, Kalatrazan District, Sanandaj County, Kurdistan Province, Iran. At the 2006 census, its population was 1,440, in 379 families. The village is populated by Kurds.
