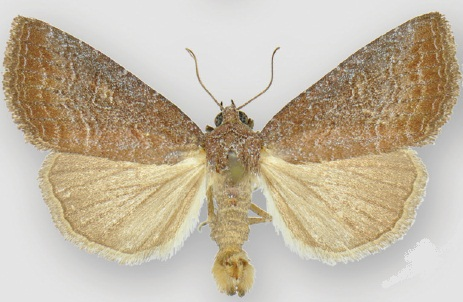
- Male

Scientific classification
- Kingdom: Animalia
- Phylum: Arthropoda
- Class: Insecta
- Order: Lepidoptera
- Superfamily: Noctuoidea
- Family: Noctuidae
- Genus: Ogdoconta
- Species: O. rufipenna

Binomial name
- Ogdoconta rufipenna Metzler, Knudson & Poole, 2013

= Ogdoconta rufipenna =

- Female

Species of moth

Ogdoconta rufipenna is a moth in the family Noctuidae. It is found in south-eastern Arizona (Santa Cruz and Cochise Counties). It is probably also found in Mexico.

The length of the forewings is 10.5–16 mm for males and 10.5–15.5 mm for females. The dorsal surface ground color is uniformly burgundy, with scattered white scales. The hindwings are dark reddish brown, the veins lined with dark.

== Etymology ==
The scientific name rufipenna comes from the Latin rufus (meaning reddish) and the Latin penna (meaning wing) and refers to the burgundy (or reddish-brown) color of the adult forewings.
