= Mianeh, Kermanshah =

Village in Kermanshah, Iran

Mianeh ميانه
- Village
- Location within Iran
- Coordinates: 34°05′05″N 47°02′47″E
- Country: Iran
- Province: Kermanshah
- County: Kermanshah
- Bakhsh: Firuzabad
- Rural District: Sar Firuzabad

Population (2006)
  - Total: 105
- Time zone: UTC+3:30 (IRST)
  - Summer (DST): UTC+4:30 (IRDT)

Mianeh (Persian: ميانه, also Romanized as Mīāneh, Meyāneh, and Mīyāneh; also known as Mīyāheh) is a village in Sar Firuzabad Rural District, Firuzabad District, Kermanshah County, Kermanshah Province, Iran. At the 2006 census, its population was 105, in 22 families.
