= Oligonyx vulnerata =

Scientific classification
- Kingdom: Animalia
- Phylum: Arthropoda
- Clade: Pancrustacea
- Class: Insecta
- Order: Lepidoptera
- Superfamily: Noctuoidea
- Family: Noctuidae; Sugi in Inoue, Sugi, Kuroko, Moriuti & Kawabe, 1982
- Species: O. vulnerata

Binomial name
- Oligonyx vulnerata (Butler, 1878)

Synonyms
- Miana vulnerata Butler, 1878; Hadena christophi Staudinger, 1888; Hadena doerriesi Staudinger, 1892

Genus of moths

Oligonyx is a genus of moths of the family Noctuidae erected by Shigero Sugi in 1982; the name is a junior homonym of the mantis genus Oligonyx Saussure, 1869, and must be replaced, following the International Code of Zoological Nomenclature. Despite that, its only species, Oligonyx vulnerata, was first described by Arthur Gardiner Butler in 1878. It is found in south-eastern Siberia, Korea, Japan, and northern and central China.
