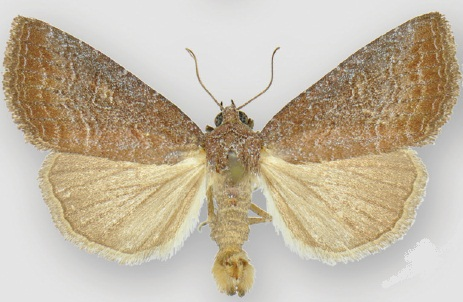
- Ogdoconta rufipenna

Scientific classification
- Kingdom: Animalia
- Phylum: Arthropoda
- Clade: Pancrustacea
- Class: Insecta
- Order: Lepidoptera
- Superfamily: Noctuoidea
- Family: Noctuidae
- Subfamily: Condicinae; Poole, 1995

= Condicinae =

Subfamily of moths

Condicinae is a subfamily of moths in the family Noctuidae. The subfamily was erected by Robert W. Poole in 1995.

== Tribes and genera ==
- Condicini Poole, 1995
  - Prospalta Walker, [1858]
  - Chytonix Grote, 1874
  - Niphonyx Sugi in Inoue, Sugi, Kuroko, Moriuti & Kawabe, 1982
  - Oligonyx Sugi in Inoue, Sugi, Kuroko, Moriuti & Kawabe, 1982
  - Pyrrhidivalva Sugi in Inoue, Sugi, Kuroko, Moriuti & Kawabe, 1982
  - Dysmilichia Speiser, 1902
  - Plusilla Staudinger, 1892
  - Condica Walker, 1856
  - Hadjina Staudinger, [1892]
  - Acosmetia Stephens, 1829
  - Homophoberia Morrison, 1875
  - Ogdoconta Butler, 1891
  - Perigea Guenée in Boisduval & Guenée, 1852
  - Bagada Walker, 1858
  - Stibaera Walker, 1857
- Leuconyctini Poole, 1995
  - Eucarta Lederer, 1857
  - Kenrickodes Viette, 1961
  - Crambodes Guenée in Boisduval & Guenée, 1852
  - Leuconycta Hampson, 1909
  - Fotella Grote, 1882
  - Diastema Guenée in Boisduval & Guenée, 1852
  - Micrathetis Hampson, 1908
- Tribe unassigned
  - Aleptina Dyar, 1902
  - Hemicephalis Möschler, 1890
