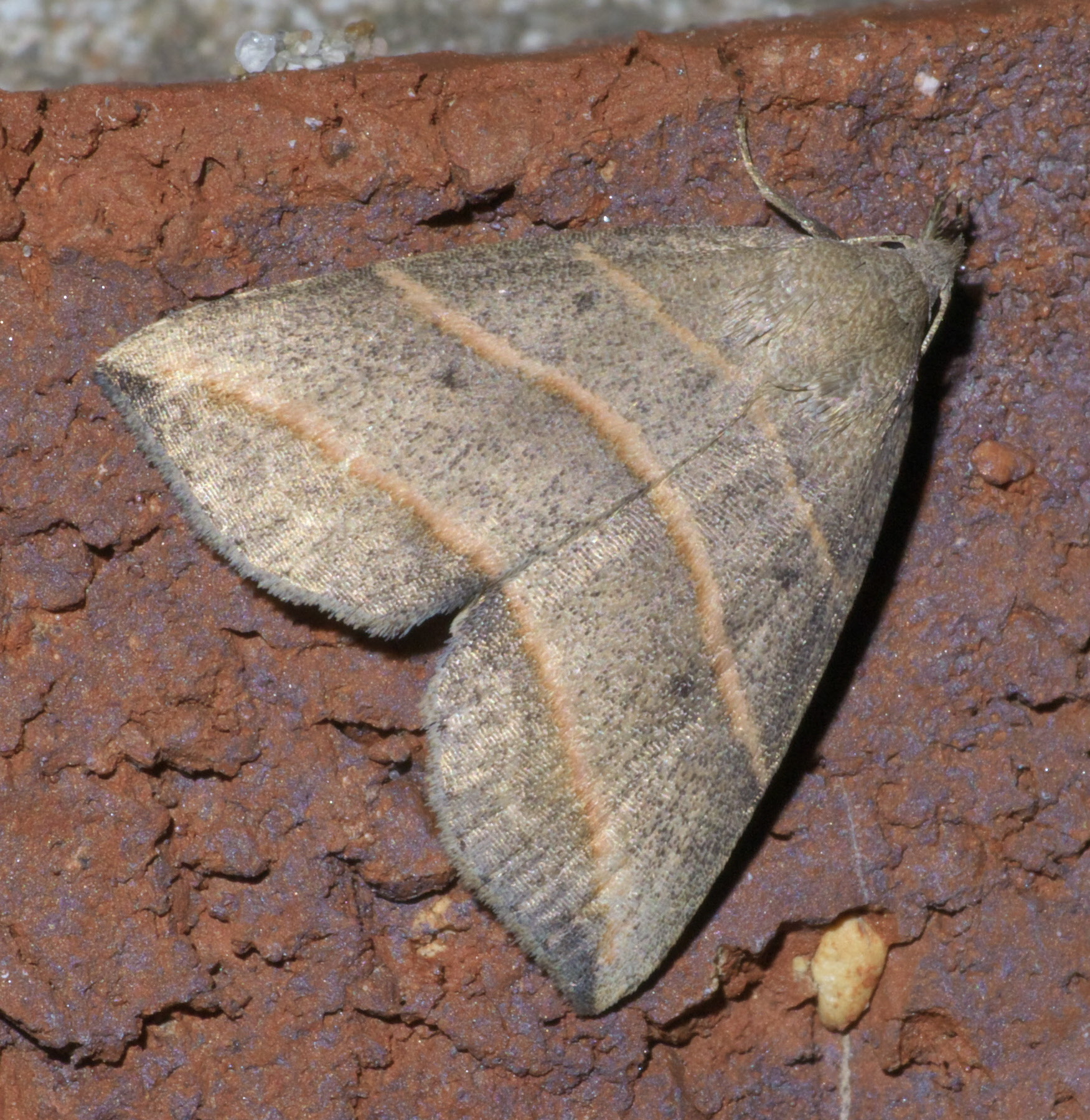

Scientific classification
- Kingdom: Animalia
- Phylum: Arthropoda
- Class: Insecta
- Order: Lepidoptera
- Superfamily: Noctuoidea
- Family: Erebidae
- Genus: Colobochyla
- Species: C. interpuncta

Binomial name
- Colobochyla interpuncta (Grote, 1872)

Synonyms
- Colobochyla saligna Zeller, 1872; Colobochyla interpuncta rufa (Grote, 1883)

= Colobochyla interpuncta =

Species of moth

Colobochyla interpuncta, the swamp belle or yellow-lined owlet, is a moth of the family Erebidae. The species was first described by Augustus Radcliffe Grote in 1872. It is found in North American wetlands from Wisconsin to Nova Scotia south to Florida and Texas.

The wingspan is 20–24 mm. Adults are on wing from April to September. There are two generations per year in Ohio and Connecticut and more southward.

The larvae feed on willow.
