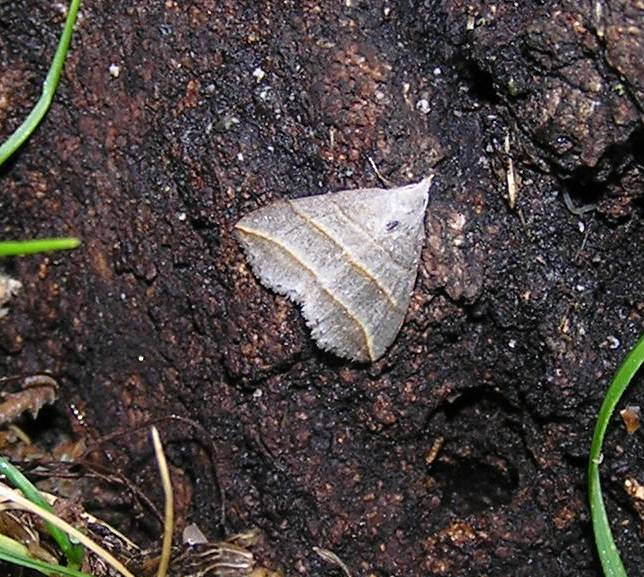

Scientific classification
- Domain: Eukaryota
- Kingdom: Animalia
- Phylum: Arthropoda
- Class: Insecta
- Order: Lepidoptera
- Superfamily: Noctuoidea
- Family: Erebidae
- Genus: Colobochyla
- Species: C. salicalis

Binomial name
- Colobochyla salicalis (Denis & Schiffermüller, 1775)

Synonyms
- Pyralis salicalis Denis & Schiffermüller, 1775; Phalaena obliquata Fabricius, 1794; Crambus salicatus Haworth, 1809; Amblygoes cinerea Butler, 1879

= Colobochyla salicalis =

Species of moth

Colobochyla salicalis, the European lesser belle or lesser belle, is a species of moth of the family Erebidae. It is found over almost all of the Palearctic.

== Technical description and variation ==
C. salicalis Schiff. (71 b). Forewing pale fuscous finely dusted with whitish, so as to appear grey; lines ferruginous edged with pale ochreous; the inner straight, the outer and subterminal somewhat curved inwards, the latter running into apex; hindwing pale fuscous, darker terminally, showing a faint subterminal line.; the forms occurring in [ Amurland and Japan] are greyer or paler that in Japan, —ab. cinerea Btlr., — greyer than the type; while the Amurland form — ab. laetalis Stgr. — is not only much paler but slightly smaller. Larva green, with the segmental incisions yellowish; the head also green; spiracles black. The wingspan is 26–30 mm.

== Biology ==
Adults are on wing from May to July. There is one generation per year.

The larvae feed on the young shoots and leaves of Populus tremula.
