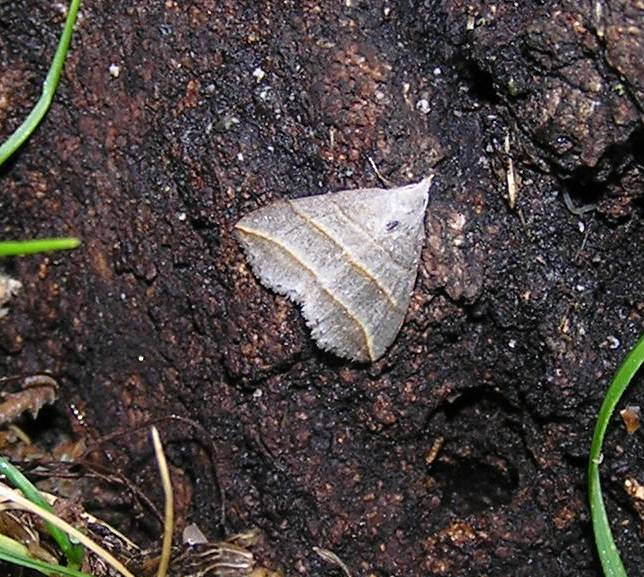
- Colobochyla salicalis

Scientific classification
- Kingdom: Animalia
- Phylum: Arthropoda
- Clade: Pancrustacea
- Class: Insecta
- Order: Lepidoptera
- Superfamily: Noctuoidea
- Family: Erebidae
- Subfamily: Hypeninae
- Genus: Colobochyla; Hübner, [1825]

= Colobochyla =

Genus of moths

Colobochyla is a genus of moths of the family Erebidae.

== Taxonomy ==
The genus has previously been classified in the subfamily Phytometrinae of Erebidae or the subfamily Calpinae of the family Noctuidae. The genus is tentatively classified in the Hypeninae but needs further phylogenetic analysis to determine its proper subfamily placement.

== Species ==
- Colobochyla interpuncta (Grote, 1872) – swamp belle moth, yellow-lined owlet
- Colobochyla mabillealis (Viette, 1954)
- Colobochyla platizona (Lederer, 1870)
- Colobochyla saalmuelleralis (Viette, 1954)
- Colobochyla salicalis (Denis & Schiffermüller, 1775) – lesser belle moth
- Colobochyla similis Warren, 1915
