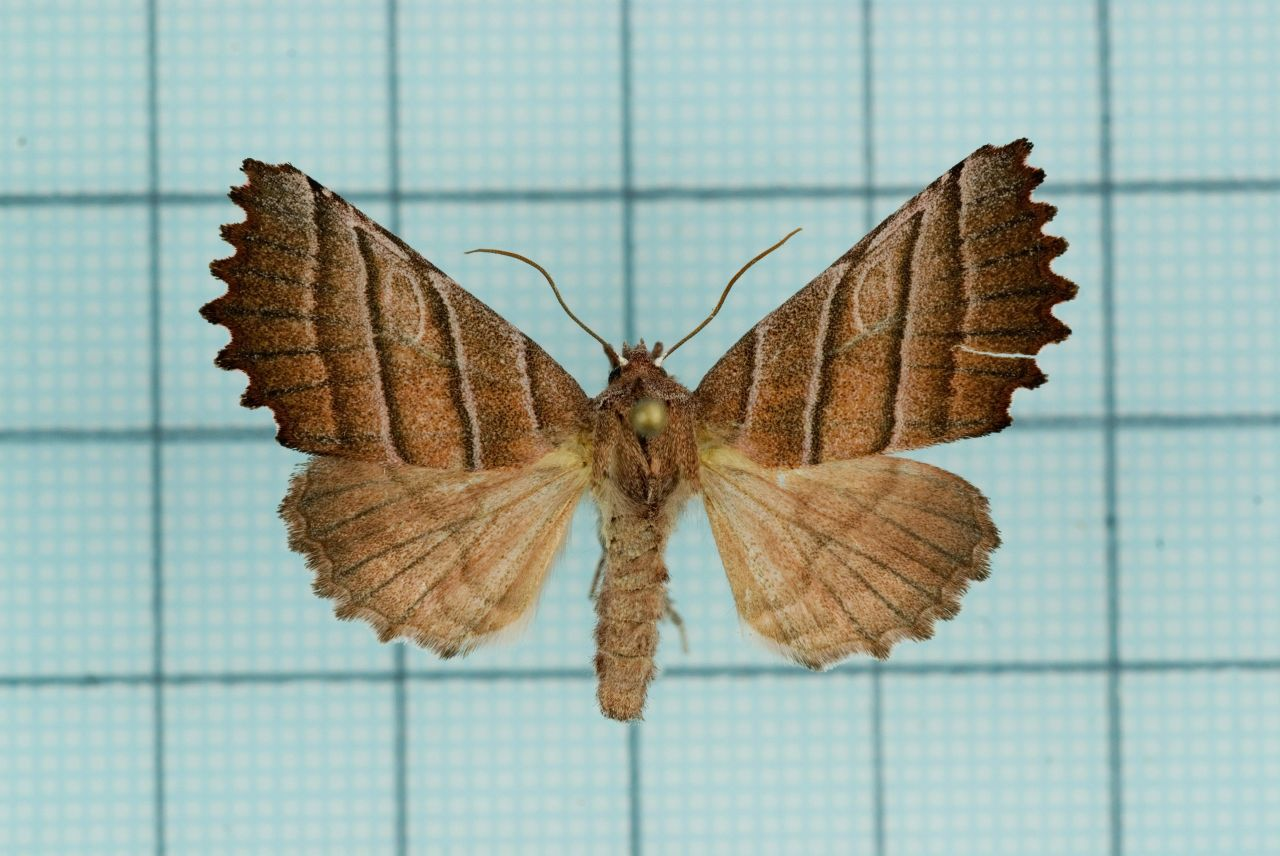
- Specie of Pygopteryx Fulva

Scientific classification
- Domain: Eukaryota
- Kingdom: Animalia
- Phylum: Arthropoda
- Class: Insecta
- Order: Lepidoptera
- Superfamily: Noctuoidea
- Family: Noctuidae
- Genus: Pygopteryx; Staudinger, 1887

Synonyms
- Prionoxanthia Draudt, 1950

= Pygopteryx =

Genus of moths

Pygopteryx is a genus of moths of the family Noctuidae.

== Species ==
- Pygopteryx fulva Chang, 1991
- Pygopteryx suava Staudinger, 1887
