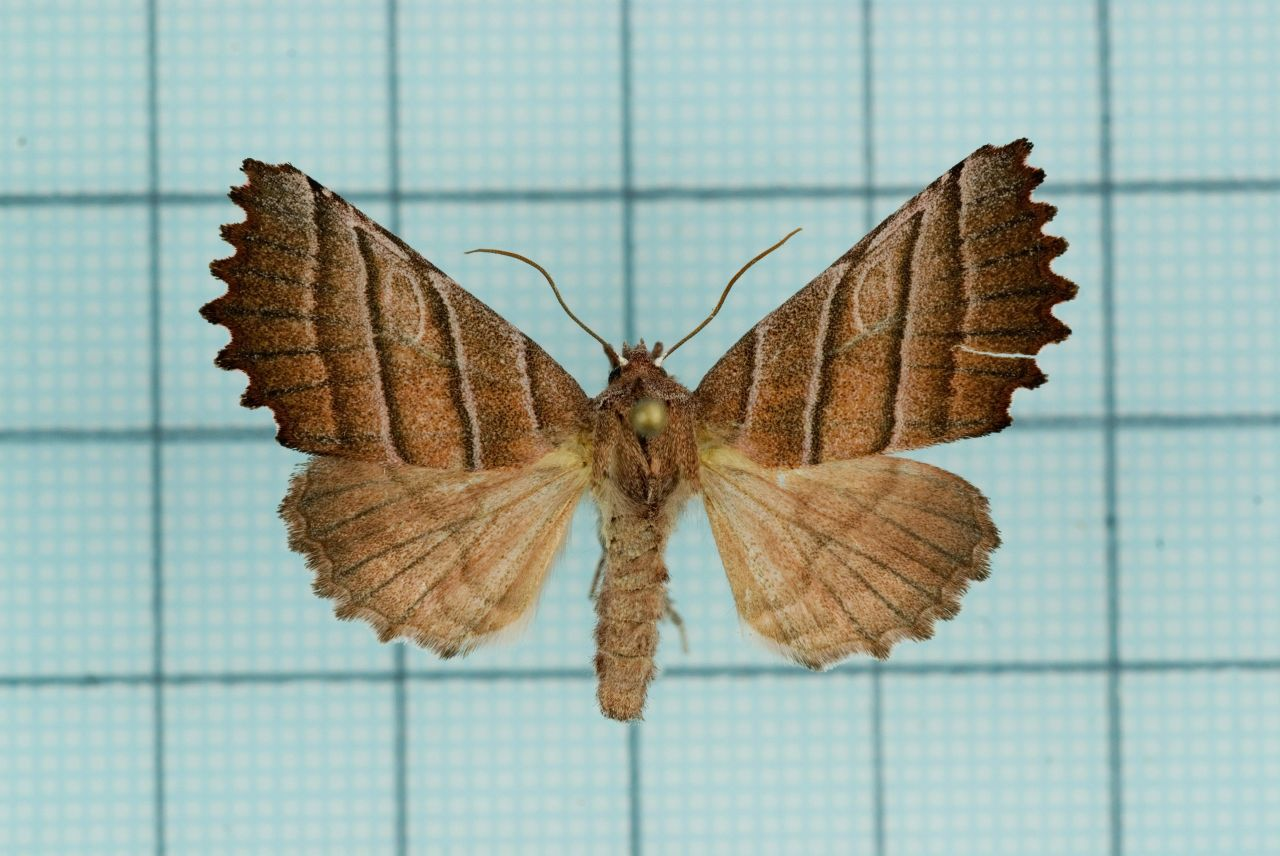

Scientific classification
- Domain: Eukaryota
- Kingdom: Animalia
- Phylum: Arthropoda
- Class: Insecta
- Order: Lepidoptera
- Superfamily: Noctuoidea
- Family: Noctuidae
- Genus: Pygopteryx
- Species: P. fulva

Binomial name
- Pygopteryx fulva Chang, 1991

= Pygopteryx fulva =

Species of moth

Pygopteryx fulva is a species of moth of the family Noctuidae. It is found in Taiwan.
