= List of noctuid genera: A =

The huge moth family Noctuidae contains the following genera:

A B C D E F G H I J K L M N O P Q R S T U V W X Y Z

- Abagrotis
- Ableptina
- Ablita
- Abolla
- Abriesa
- Abrostola
- Abseudrapa
- Acacallis
- Acaenica
- Acanthermia
- Acanthodelta
- Acanthodica
- Acantholeucania
- Acanthoplusia
- Acanthopolia
- Acanthoprora
- Acantuerta
- Acerra
- Achaeops
- Acharya
- Achatia
- Achatodes
- Acherdoa
- Achytonix
- Acidaliodes
- Acmana
- Acontarache
- Acontia
- Acontiola
- Acopa
- Acosmetia
- Acrapex
- Acrarmostis
- Acrobyla
- Acronicta
- Acropserotarache
- Acroria
- Acroriesis
- Acroriodes
- Acrosphalia
- Actebia
- Actinotia
- Acutipenna
- Acygnatha
- Acygonia
- Acylita
- Adamphipyra
- Adaphaenura
- Adelphagrotis
- Adeva
- Adiopa
- Adipsophanes
- Adisura
- Admetovis
- Adpyramidcampa
- Adra
- Adrapsa
- Adrapsoides
- Adris
- Adrocampa
- Adyroma
- Aegara
- Aegle
- Aegleoides
- Aegocera
- Aegoceropsis
- Aeologramma
- Aethalina
- Aethodes
- Afotella
- Afrenella
- Afrogortyna
- Agabra
- Agamana
- Aganopis
- Aganzagara
- Agape
- Agarista
- Agaristodes
- Agassizia
- Aggustiana
- Aginna
- Aglossestra
- Aglossostola
- Agnomonia
- Agnorisma
- Agoma
- Agraga
- Agrapha
- Agriopodes
- Agrochola
- Agrolitha
- Agronoma
- Agroperina
- Agrotana
- Agrotimorpha
- Agrotiphila
- Agrotis
- Agrotisia
- Agrotontia
- Agyra
- Aingrapha
- Airamia
- Akoniodes
- Akonus
- Alamis
- Alapadna
- Alberticodes
- Alelimma
- Alelimminola
- Aleptina
- Aleptinoides
- Aletia
- Aletopus
- Aleucanitis
- Alibama
- Alika
- Alikangiana
- Alimala
- Alinobia
- Alinza
- Allagrapha
- Allia
- Allitoria
- Alloasteropetes
- Allophyes
- Allorhodoecia
- Alogonia
- Alophosoma
- Alpesa
- Alpichola
- Alpsotis
- Altiplania
- Altipolia
- Aluaca
- Alura
- Alvaradoia
- Alypia
- Alypiodes
- Alypophanes
- Alysina
- Amabela
- Amarna
- Amathes
- Amazela
- Amazonides
- Amblygoes
- Amblygonia
- Amblyprora
- Amefrontia
- Amelina
- Amephana
- Ametropalpis
- Amiana
- Amilaga
- Ammetopa
- Ammoconia
- Ammogrotis
- Ammophanes
- Ammopolia
- Ampelasia
- Amphia
- Amphidrina
- Amphigonia
- Amphilita
- Amphiongia
- Amphipoea
- Amphipyra
- Amphitrogia
- Amphitrota
- Amphodia
- Amphoraceras
- Amyna
- Amynodes
- Anabathra
- Anablemma
- Anadevidia
- Anagoa
- Anagrapha
- Analetia
- Anamecia
- Ananepa
- Anapamea
- Anaplectoides
- Anaplusia
- Anapoma
- Anarta
- Anartodes
- Anartomima
- Anartomorpha
- Anatatha
- Anateinoma
- Anathetis
- Anathix
- Ancara
- Ancarista
- Anchiroe
- Anchoscelis
- Ancistris
- Andesia
- Andicola
- Andobana
- Andrewsia
- Andrhippuris
- Andrianam
- Androdes
- Androloma
- Androlymnia
- Andropolia
- Aneda
- Anedhella
- Aneliopis
- Anepilecta
- Anepischetos
- Anereuthina
- Anereuthinula
- Aneuviminia
- Angulostiria
- Anhausta
- Anhimella
- Aniana
- Anicla
- Anisoneura
- Anitha
- Annaphila
- Anoba
- Anodontodes
- Anomis
- Anomocala
- Anomogyna
- Anomophlebia
- Anophia
- Anophiodes
- Anoratha
- Anorena
- Anorthoa
- Anorthodes
- Anpyramida
- Ansa
- Antachara
- Antapamea
- Antapistis
- Antaplaga
- Antarchaea
- Anterastria
- Antha
- Anthocitta
- Anthodes
- Antholopha
- Anthracia
- Antiamphipyra
- Antiblemma
- Anticarsia
- Antichera
- Antigodasa
- Antiophlebia
- Antipolia
- Antirhyacia
- Antitype
- Antivaleria
- Antoculeora
- Anua
- Anugana
- Anumeta
- Anycteola
- Anydrophila
- Aon
- Apaconjunctdonta
- Apaegocera
- Apamea
- Apanda
- Apaustis
- Apharetra
- Aphorisma
- Aphypena
- Apina
- Apistis
- Apladrapsa
- Aplectoides
- Aplocampa
- Apocalymnia
- Apopestes
- Aporophoba
- Aporophyla
- Apospasta
- Apostema
- Apoxestia
- Appana
- Apphadana
- Apsaphida
- Apsaranycta
- Apsarasa
- Apustis
- Arabriga
- Araea
- Araeognatha
- Araeopterella
- Araeopteron
- Aramuna
- Arasada
- Arattatha
- Arbasera
- Arboricornus
- Arbostola
- Archana
- Archanara
- Archanarta
- Archephia
- Arcilasisa
- Arcte
- Arctinia
- Arctiopais
- Arctomyscis
- Arenarba
- Arenostola
- Aretypa
- Argania
- Argentostiria
- Argidia
- Argillana
- Argillophora
- Argiva
- Argyphia
- Argyrana
- Argyrargenta
- Argyrhoda
- Argyritis
- Argyrogalea
- Argyrogramma
- Argyrolepidia
- Argyrolopha
- Argyromata
- Argyromatoides
- Argyropasta
- Argyrospila
- Argyrosticta
- Argyrostrotis
- Ariathisa
- Aridagricola
- Ariphrades
- Aristaria
- Armada
- Armana
- Aroana
- Arpia
- Arrade
- Arrothia
- Arsacia
- Arsaciodes
- Arsilonche
- Arsina
- Arsisaca
- Artena
- Arthisma
- Arthrochlora
- Artigisa
- Artiloxis
- Arugisa
- Arvaduca
- Arytrura
- Arytrurides
- Arzama
- Arzamopsis
- Ascalapha
- Asclepistola
- Aseptis
- Ashworthia
- Asiccia
- Asidemia
- Asisyra
- Asota
- Aspidhampsonia
- Aspidifrontia
- Asplenia
- Asta
- Astephana
- Asteropetes
- Asteroscopus
- Astha
- Asthala
- Asthana
- Asticta
- Astiotes
- Astonycha
- Asylaea
- Asymbata
- Asymbletia
- Asyneda
- Ateneria
- Atethmia
- Athaumasta
- Athetis
- Athurmodes
- Athyrma
- Athyrmella
- Athyrmina
- Athysania
- Atimaea
- Atlantagrotis
- Atopomorpha
- Atrachea
- Atrephes
- Attatha
- Attonda
- Atypha
- Aucha
- Auchecranon
- Auchenisa
- Auchmis
- Auchmophanes
- Aucula
- Audea
- Aulocheta
- Aulotarache
- Aumakua
- Aurxanthia
- Ausava
- Ausinza
- Australothis
- Austramathes
- Austrandesia
- Austrazenia
- Authadistis
- Autoba
- Autographa
- Autophila
- Autoplusia
- Avatha
- Aventina
- Aventiola
- Avirostrum
- Avitta
- Avittonia
- Axenus
- Axiocteta
- Axiorata
- Axylia
- Azatha
- Azazia
- Azenia
- Azeta
- Azirista
- Azumaia
