= Alogonia =

Alogonia may refer to:

- Alogonia (moth), a genus of moths
- Alogonia (town), an ancient town of Messenia
- Alogonia (ship), a British steamship
