= List of noctuid genera: J =

The huge moth family Noctuidae contains the following genera:

A B C D E F G H I J K L M N O P Q R S T U V W X Y Z

- Janaesia
- Janseodes
- Janthinea
- Jarasana
- Jaspidia
- Jaxartia
- Jocheaera
- Jochroa
- Jodia
- Juncaria
- Jussalypena
