= Cyrtandra =

Cyrtandra may refer to:

- Cyrtandra (plant), a genus of plants in the family Gesneriaceae
- Cyrtandra (moth), a genus of moths in the family Noctuidae. It is now known as Avittonia
