= Tricheurois =

Scientific classification
- Kingdom: Animalia
- Phylum: Arthropoda
- Class: Insecta
- Order: Lepidoptera
- Superfamily: Noctuoidea
- Family: Noctuidae
- Subfamily: Noctuinae
- Genus: Tricheurois; Hampson, 1905

Synonyms
- Acanthopolia Boursin, 1943

Genus of moths

Tricheurois is a genus of moths of the family Noctuidae.

== Species ==
- Tricheurois nigrocuprea (Moore, 1867)
