= Adeva (disambiguation) =

Adeva is an American singer.

Adeva may also mean:

- Adeva!, the 1989 debut album by Adeva
- Adeva (moth), genus of moths
- Víctor Mongil Adeva, Spanish footballer
- Akademische Druck- und Verlagsanstalt (ADEVA), Austrian book publisher which specializes primarily in the publication of complex facsimile editions
