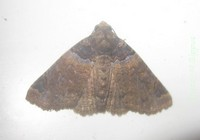

Scientific classification
- Kingdom: Animalia
- Phylum: Arthropoda
- Class: Insecta
- Order: Lepidoptera
- Superfamily: Noctuoidea
- Family: Noctuidae (?)
- Genus: Argyrolopha
- Species: A. costibarbata

Binomial name
- Argyrolopha costibarbata Hampson, 1914

= Argyrolopha costibarbata =

Species of moth

Argyrolopha costibarbata is a moth of the family Noctuidae first described by George Hampson in 1914. It is found in Mauritius and Réunion.

The length of its forewings is about 10 mm.
