= Acylita elongata =

Scientific classification
- Domain: Eukaryota
- Kingdom: Animalia
- Phylum: Arthropoda
- Class: Insecta
- Order: Lepidoptera
- Superfamily: Noctuoidea
- Family: Noctuidae
- Genus: Acylita
- Species: A. elongata

Binomial name
- Acylita elongata Schaus, 1906

Synonyms
- Doryodes elongata

Species of moth

Acylita elongata is a species of moth of the family Noctuidae first described by William Schaus in 1906. It is found in Brazil. Its wingspan is about 34 mm.

== Description ==
Head and thorax white suffused with brown; palpi pale yellow tinged with red at sides; pectus and legs ochreous tinged with brown; abdomen ochreous slightly irrorated (sprinkled) with brown. Forewing white suffused with pink especially on inner and terminal areas and slightly irrorated with brown; the costal edge white; the veins of terminal area slightly streaked with white; a faint brown fascia from base through the cell and thence obliquely to termen just below apex; a dark point in middle of cell; a terminal series of minute dark points. Hindwing white very faintly tinged with brown; the underside with the costa faintly tinged with pink and slightly irrorated with brown.
