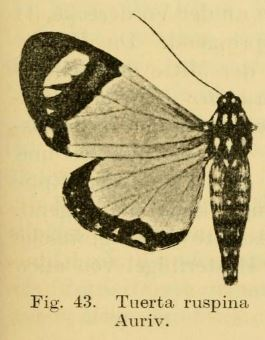

Scientific classification
- Kingdom: Animalia
- Phylum: Arthropoda
- Class: Insecta
- Order: Lepidoptera
- Superfamily: Noctuoidea
- Family: Noctuidae
- Genus: Aletopus
- Species: A. ruspina

Binomial name
- Aletopus ruspina (Aurivillius, 1909)

Synonyms
- Tuerta (Misa) ruspina Aurivillius, 1909

= Aletopus ruspina =

Species of moth

Aletopus ruspina is a moth of the family Noctuidae. It is found in the Republic of Congo.
