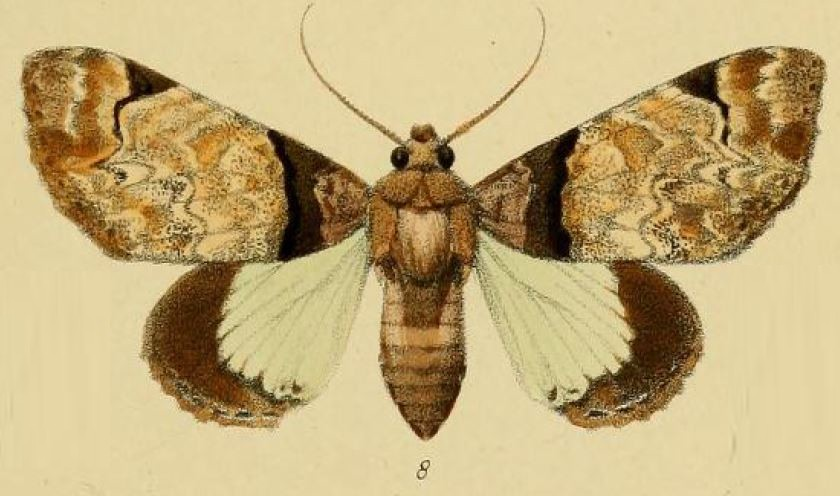

Scientific classification
- Domain: Eukaryota
- Kingdom: Animalia
- Phylum: Arthropoda
- Class: Insecta
- Order: Lepidoptera
- Superfamily: Noctuoidea
- Family: Noctuidae (?)
- Genus: Amblyprora
- Species: A. magnifica

Binomial name
- Amblyprora magnifica (Schaus & Clements, 1893)

Synonyms
- Trisula magnifica Schaus & Clements,1893

= Amblyprora magnifica =

Species of moth

Amblyprora magnifica is a moth of the family Erebidae described by William Schaus and W. G. Clements in 1893. This species is found in the Democratic Republic of the Congo, Sierra Leone and South Africa.
