= Hepsidera =

Scientific classification
- Domain: Eukaryota
- Kingdom: Animalia
- Phylum: Arthropoda
- Class: Insecta
- Order: Lepidoptera
- Superfamily: Noctuoidea
- Family: Erebidae
- Subfamily: Hypeninae
- Genus: Hepsidera; C. Swinhoe, 1902

Genus of moths

Hepsidera is a genus of moths of the family Erebidae. The genus was erected by Charles Swinhoe in 1902.

Afromoths and Butterflies and Moths of the World give this name as a synonym of Alelimma Hampson, 1895.

== Species ==
- Hepsidera deletaria (Hampson, 1895) Sikkim
- Hepsidera ferruginea Holloway, 2008 Borneo, Peninsular Malaysia, Sumatra
- Hepsidera lignea C. Swinhoe, 1902 Peninsular Malaysia, Sumatra, Borneo
