= Acylita sanguifusa =

Scientific classification
- Domain: Eukaryota
- Kingdom: Animalia
- Phylum: Arthropoda
- Class: Insecta
- Order: Lepidoptera
- Superfamily: Noctuoidea
- Family: Noctuidae
- Genus: Acylita
- Species: A. sanguifusa

Binomial name
- Acylita sanguifusa E. D. Jones, 1908

Synonyms
- Doryodes sanguifusa

Species of moth

Acylita sanguifusa is a species of moth of the family Noctuidae first described by E. Dukinfield Jones in 1908. It is found in Brazil. Its wingspan is about 26 mm.

== Description ==
Head and thorax ochreous suffused with rufous; pectus whitish; legs brown; abdomen white slightly irrorated (sprinkled) with brown. Forewing whitish suffused with bright pink; a deep pink fascia in cell and thence obliquely to apex; the inner area deep pink; the terminal area with deep pink streaks in the interspaces. Hindwing white, the terminal area faintly irrorated with ochreous; the underside with the costal area suffused with ochreous.
