= Acylita distincta =

Scientific classification
- Domain: Eukaryota
- Kingdom: Animalia
- Phylum: Arthropoda
- Class: Insecta
- Order: Lepidoptera
- Superfamily: Noctuoidea
- Family: Noctuidae
- Genus: Acylita
- Species: A. distincta

Binomial name
- Acylita distincta E. D. Jones, 1908

Synonyms
- Boryodes disticta

Species of moth

Acylita distincta is a species of moth of the family Noctuidae first described by E. Dukinfield Jones in 1908. It is found in Brazil. Its wingspan is about 26 mm.

== Description ==
Head and thorax brownish ochreous; pectus and hindlegs whitish, fore and mid legs and hind tarsi at extremity fuscous brown; abdomen white tinged with ochreous and slightly irrorated (sprinkled) with fuscous. Forewing brownish ochreous sparsely irrorated with black; black points in middle of cell and on discocellulars; slight fuscous points above and below submedian fold just beyond middle; a faint, diffused oblique fuscous streak from apex to just beyond discoidal point and a diffused oblique subtertninal line from below apex to submedian fold; a terminal series of black points. Hindwing white suffused with ochreous except on inner area; cilia white; the underside white, the costal area suffused with ochreous and slightly irrorated with brown.
