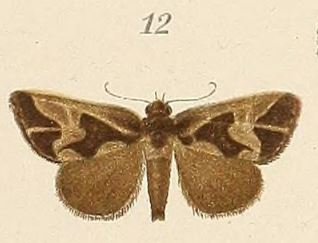

Scientific classification
- Kingdom: Animalia
- Phylum: Arthropoda
- Clade: Pancrustacea
- Class: Insecta
- Order: Lepidoptera
- Superfamily: Noctuoidea
- Family: Erebidae
- Genus: Agamana
- Species: A. inscripta

Binomial name
- Agamana inscripta (Pagenstecher, 1907)

Synonyms
- Bryophila inscripta Pagenstecher, 1907; Parafodina inscripta (Pagenstecher, 1907)

= Agamana inscripta =

Species of moth

Agamana inscripta is a moth of the family Erebidae first described by Arnold Pagenstecher in 1907. It is found in southwest Madagascar.

It has an expansion of 25 mm.
