= Callhyccoda =

Scientific classification
- Kingdom: Animalia
- Phylum: Arthropoda
- Clade: Pancrustacea
- Class: Insecta
- Order: Lepidoptera
- Superfamily: Noctuoidea
- Family: Noctuidae
- Genus: Callhyccoda; Berio, 1935

Synonyms
- Aegleoides Berio, 1937

Genus of moths

Callhyccoda is a genus of moths of the family Noctuidae erected by Emilio Berio in 1935.

== Species ==
- Callhyccoda indecora Hacker, 2019 Sierra Leone
- Callhyccoda mirei Herbulot & Viette, 1952 Chad, Ethiopia, Somalia, Djibouti, Arabia
- Callhyccoda namibiensis Hacker, 2019 Namibia
- Callhyccoda nigrofalcata Hacker, 2019 Tanzania
- Callhyccoda ochrata Hacker, Fiebig & Stadie, 2019 Uganda
- Callhyccoda paolii (Berio, 1937) Somalia, Ethiopia
- Callhyccoda viriditrina Berio, 1935 Sudan, Somalia, Ethiopia, Kenya
