= Ancara obliterans =

Scientific classification
- Kingdom: Animalia
- Phylum: Arthropoda
- Class: Insecta
- Order: Lepidoptera
- Superfamily: Noctuoidea
- Family: Noctuidae
- Genus: Ancara
- Species: A. obliterans

Binomial name
- Ancara obliterans Walker, 1858

Species of moth

Ancara obliterans is a moth of the family Noctuidae first described by Francis Walker in 1858. It is found in Sri Lanka, India, Malaysia, Sumatra and Borneo.
