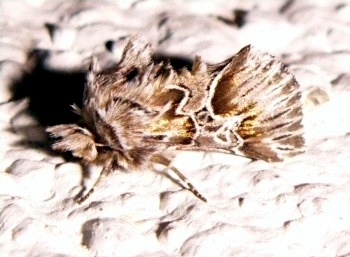

Scientific classification
- Domain: Eukaryota
- Kingdom: Animalia
- Phylum: Arthropoda
- Class: Insecta
- Order: Lepidoptera
- Superfamily: Noctuoidea
- Family: Noctuidae
- Genus: Amephana
- Species: A. anarrhini

Binomial name
- Amephana anarrhini (Duponchel, 1840)

Synonyms
- Cleophana anarrhini Duponchel, 1840

= Amephana anarrhini =

Species of moth

Amephana anarrhini is a moth of the family Noctuidae. It is found in Italy, southern France and the Iberian Peninsula.

The wingspan is 28–32 mm. Adults are on wing from April to June in one generation per year.

The larvae feed on Helianthemum nummularium.
