= Forsebia mendozina =

Scientific classification
- Kingdom: Animalia
- Phylum: Arthropoda
- Class: Insecta
- Order: Lepidoptera
- Superfamily: Noctuoidea
- Family: Erebidae
- Genus: Forsebia
- Species: F. mendozina

Binomial name
- Forsebia mendozina (Hampson, 1926)

Synonyms
- Syneda mendozina Hampson, 1926

Species of moth

Forsebia mendozina is a moth of the family Erebidae. It is found in the Andes Mountains of Peru and Argentina.
