= Amblygonia =

Scientific classification
- Domain: Eukaryota
- Kingdom: Animalia
- Phylum: Arthropoda
- Class: Insecta
- Order: Lepidoptera
- Superfamily: Noctuoidea
- Family: Noctuidae (?)
- Subfamily: Catocalinae
- Genus: Amblygonia; C. Felder & R. Felder, [1865]

Genus of moths

Amblygonia is a synonym of the moth genus Parcella Stichel, 1910 of the family Noctuidae. It is listed as a genus on Butterflies and Moths of the World.

The Global Lepidoptera Names Index also lists it as a synonym of Juncaria Walker, 1858 of the family Erebidae.
