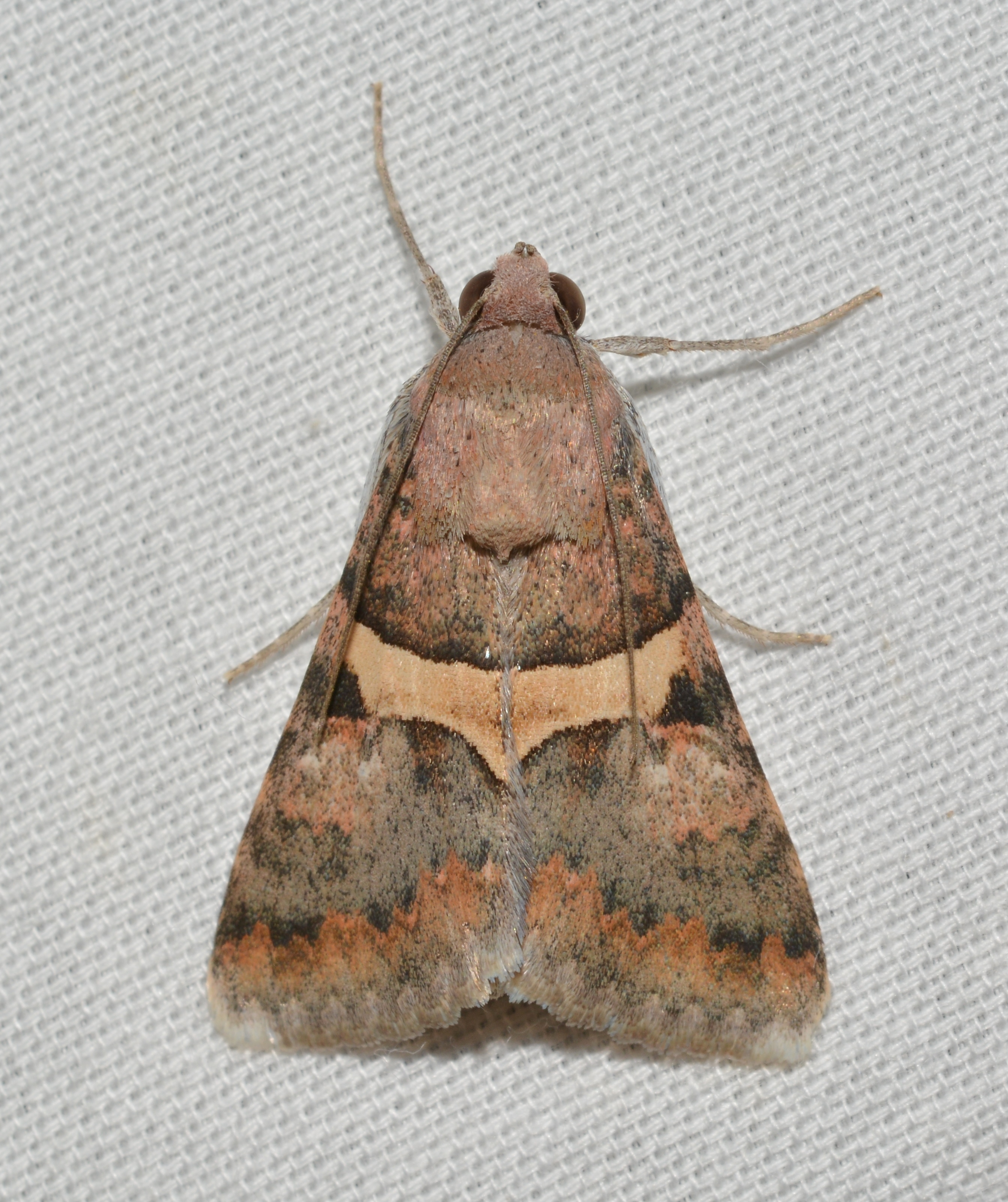

Scientific classification
- Kingdom: Animalia
- Phylum: Arthropoda
- Class: Insecta
- Order: Lepidoptera
- Superfamily: Noctuoidea
- Family: Erebidae
- Genus: Forsebia
- Species: F. cinis

Binomial name
- Forsebia cinis (Guenée, 1852)

Synonyms
- Bolina cinis Guenée, 1852; Melipotis perlaeta Edwards, 1882; Synedoida aegrota Edwards, 1884; Syneda flavofasciata Strecker, 1898

= Forsebia cinis =

Species of moth

Forsebia cinis, the forsebia moth, is a moth of the family Erebidae. It is found in North America, where it has been recorded from southern California and southern Nevada to western Texas and Oklahoma.

The length of the forewings is 14–16 mm. Adults are on wing from late February to October.

The larvae feed on various woody legumes, including Parkinsonia species.
