= Acylita monosticta =

Scientific classification
- Domain: Eukaryota
- Kingdom: Animalia
- Phylum: Arthropoda
- Class: Insecta
- Order: Lepidoptera
- Superfamily: Noctuoidea
- Family: Noctuidae
- Genus: Acylita
- Species: A. monosticta

Binomial name
- Acylita monosticta E. D. Jones, 1908

Synonyms
- Boryodes monosticta

Species of moth

Acylita monosticta is a species of moth of the family Noctuidae first described by E. Dukinfield Jones in 1908. It is found in Brazil. Its wingspan is about 24 mm.

== Description ==
Head and thorax brownish ochreous; pectus white; legs brownish ochreous; abdomen white tinged with ochreous and slightly irrorated (sprinkled) with fuscous. Forewing brownish ochreous faintly tinged with red and very slightly irrorated with brown; a black discoidal point; traces of an oblique diffused red fascia from apex to discocellulars. Hindwing white suffused with ochreous; the underside white, the costal area suffused with ochreous.
