= Acylita dukinfieldi =

Scientific classification
- Domain: Eukaryota
- Kingdom: Animalia
- Phylum: Arthropoda
- Class: Insecta
- Order: Lepidoptera
- Superfamily: Noctuoidea
- Family: Noctuidae
- Genus: Acylita
- Species: A. dukinfieldi

Binomial name
- Acylita dukinfieldi Schaus, 1894

Synonyms
- Acylita ducinfieldi; Boryodes dukinfieldi

Species of moth

Acylita dukinfieldi is a species of moth of the family Noctuidae first described by William Schaus in 1894. It is found in Brazil. Its wingspan is about 30 mm.

== Description ==
Head and thorax ochreous suffused with red brown; abdomen ochreous. Forewing bright pink; the costal edge ochreous; a slight white streak on the median nervure and the bases of the veins arising from it. Hindwing white very faintly tinged with brown.
