= Acylita cara =

Scientific classification
- Domain: Eukaryota
- Kingdom: Animalia
- Phylum: Arthropoda
- Class: Insecta
- Order: Lepidoptera
- Superfamily: Noctuoidea
- Family: Noctuidae
- Genus: Acylita
- Species: A. cara

Binomial name
- Acylita cara Schaus, 1894

Synonyms
- Doryodes cara

Species of moth

Acylita cara is a species of moth of the family Noctuidae first described by William Schaus in 1894. It is found in Brazil. Its wingspan is about 28 mm.

== Description ==
The head, thorax, and abdomen are white and slightly tinged with rufous. The forelegs brownish, and the forewings are white and irrorated (sprinkled) with crimson. A bright rufous fascia extends from close to the base through the cell to apex narrowing to points at extremities and defined above and below by white streaks. A slight oblique red fascia extends from termen just below apex to vein 1 beyond the middle. There is a fine red terminal line. Hindwings are white very faintly tinged with brown; the underside irrorated with crimson, strongly on costal area.
