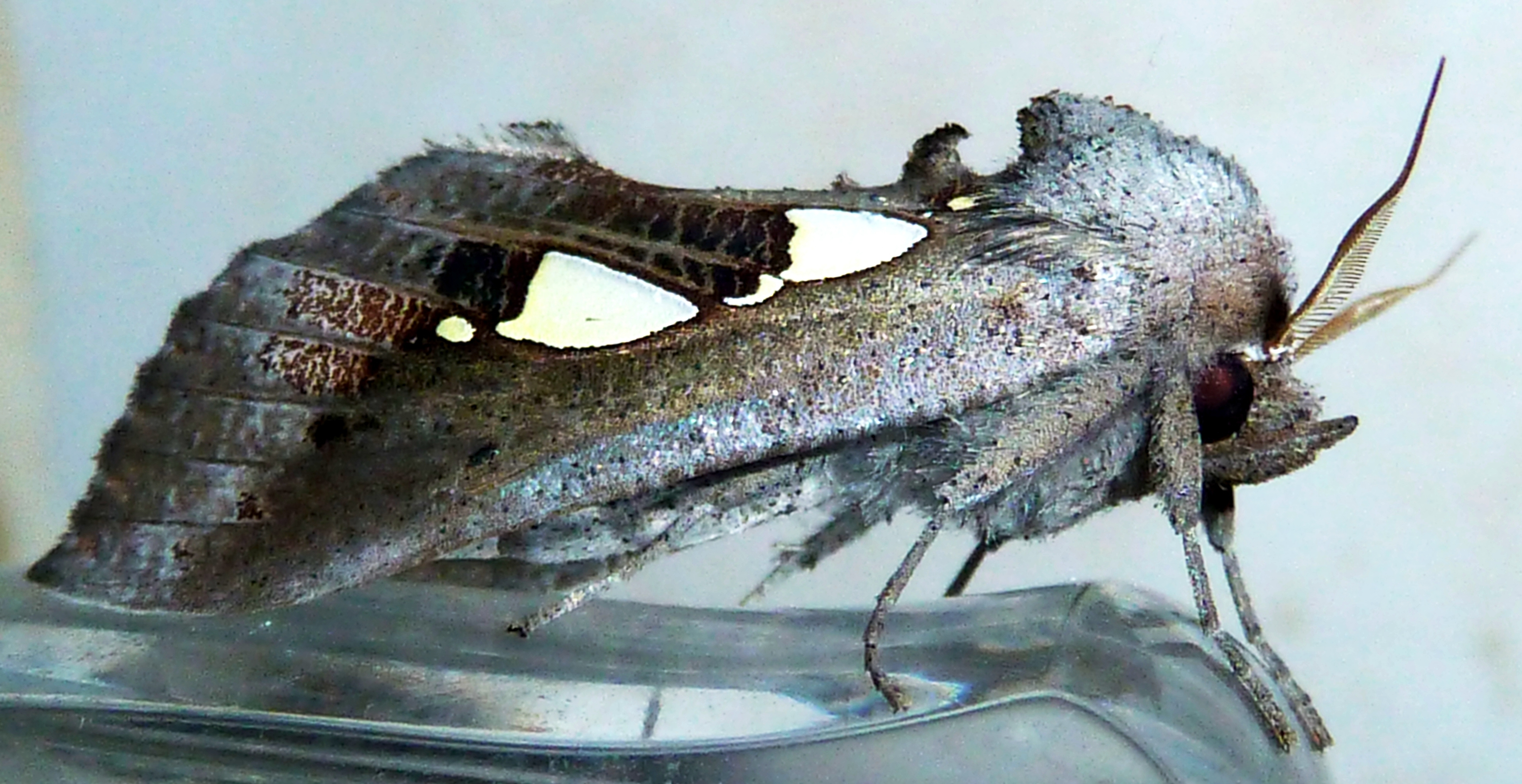

Scientific classification
- Domain: Eukaryota
- Kingdom: Animalia
- Phylum: Arthropoda
- Class: Insecta
- Order: Lepidoptera
- Superfamily: Noctuoidea
- Family: Erebidae
- Genus: Antiophlebia
- Species: A. bracteata

Binomial name
- Antiophlebia bracteata Felder, 1874

= Antiophlebia bracteata =

Species of moth

Antiophlebia bracteata, the pearl spangled, is a species of erebid moth described by Rudolf Felder in 1874.

The larval foodplants of Antiophlebia bracteata is Diospyros species.

== Distribution ==
The distribution of Antiophlebia bracteata is mostly Southern Africa.
