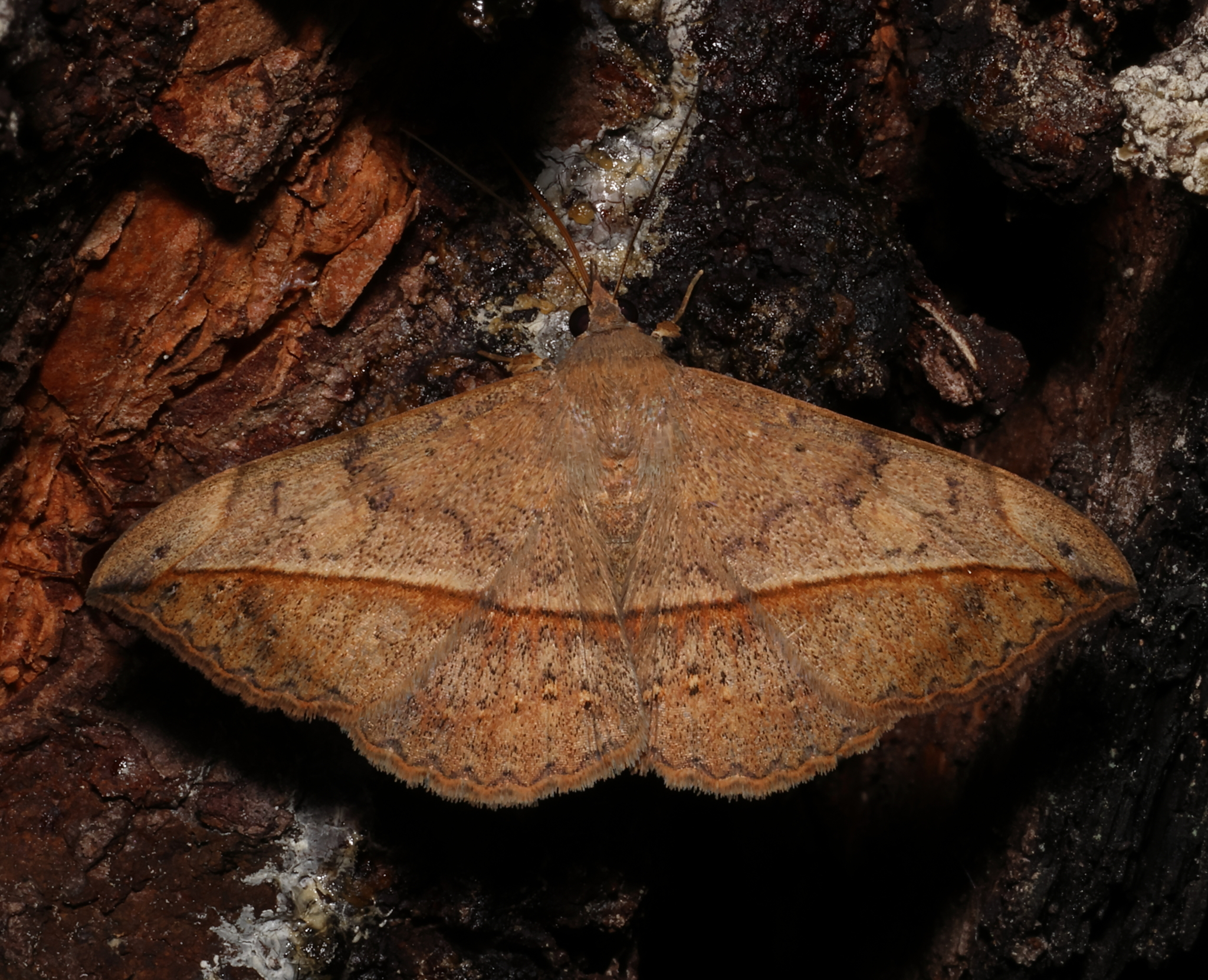

Scientific classification
- Kingdom: Animalia
- Phylum: Arthropoda
- Clade: Pancrustacea
- Class: Insecta
- Order: Lepidoptera
- Superfamily: Noctuoidea
- Family: Erebidae
- Genus: Anticarsia
- Species: A. gemmatalis

Binomial name
- Anticarsia gemmatalis Hübner, 1818

Synonyms
- Thermesia elegantula Herrich-Schaffer, 1869; Anticarsia elegantula

= Anticarsia gemmatalis =

Species of moth

Anticarsia gemmatalis is a tropical species of caterpillar and moth that migrates north each season. The species can commonly be found in the Gulf states, north as far as Wisconsin. The adults have wings that are grayish brown, crossed with brown or black zigzag lines. The caterpillars are black or green, with narrow lighter stripes on the back and sides. They spit out a brownish substance, spring into the air and wriggle a lot when they are disturbed. The species eats velvet beans, peanut, soybeans, cotton, kudzu, alfalfa, cowpeas, horse beans, snap beans, lima beans, and coffeeweeds. Its common name is velvetbean caterpillar and velvetbean moth.

Egg viability was highest at 25 °C (77 °F) and adaptation to higher temperatures did not occur over a three generation observation. This suggests global warming will reduce A. gemmatalis losses on soybeans in tropical areas that are already at 25 °C (77 °F) but increase predation on soybeans in areas currently below that temperature, thus in fact only shifting the affected area.
