= Aroana cingalensis =

Scientific classification
- Kingdom: Animalia
- Phylum: Arthropoda
- Class: Insecta
- Order: Lepidoptera
- Superfamily: Noctuoidea
- Family: Noctuidae
- Genus: Aroana
- Species: A. cingalensis

Binomial name
- Aroana cingalensis (Walker, [1866])

Synonyms
- Egnasia cingalensis Walker, [1866]

Species of moth

Aroana cingalensis is a moth of the family Noctuidae first described by Francis Walker in 1866. It is found in Sri Lanka.
