= Arenarba destituta =

Scientific classification
- Domain: Eukaryota
- Kingdom: Animalia
- Phylum: Arthropoda
- Class: Insecta
- Order: Lepidoptera
- Superfamily: Noctuoidea
- Family: Noctuidae
- Genus: Arenarba
- Species: A. destituta

Binomial name
- Arenarba destituta Moore, 1884

Species of moth

Arenarba destituta is a moth of the family Noctuidae first described by Frederic Moore in 1884. It is found in Sri Lanka, South Africa and New Zealand.
