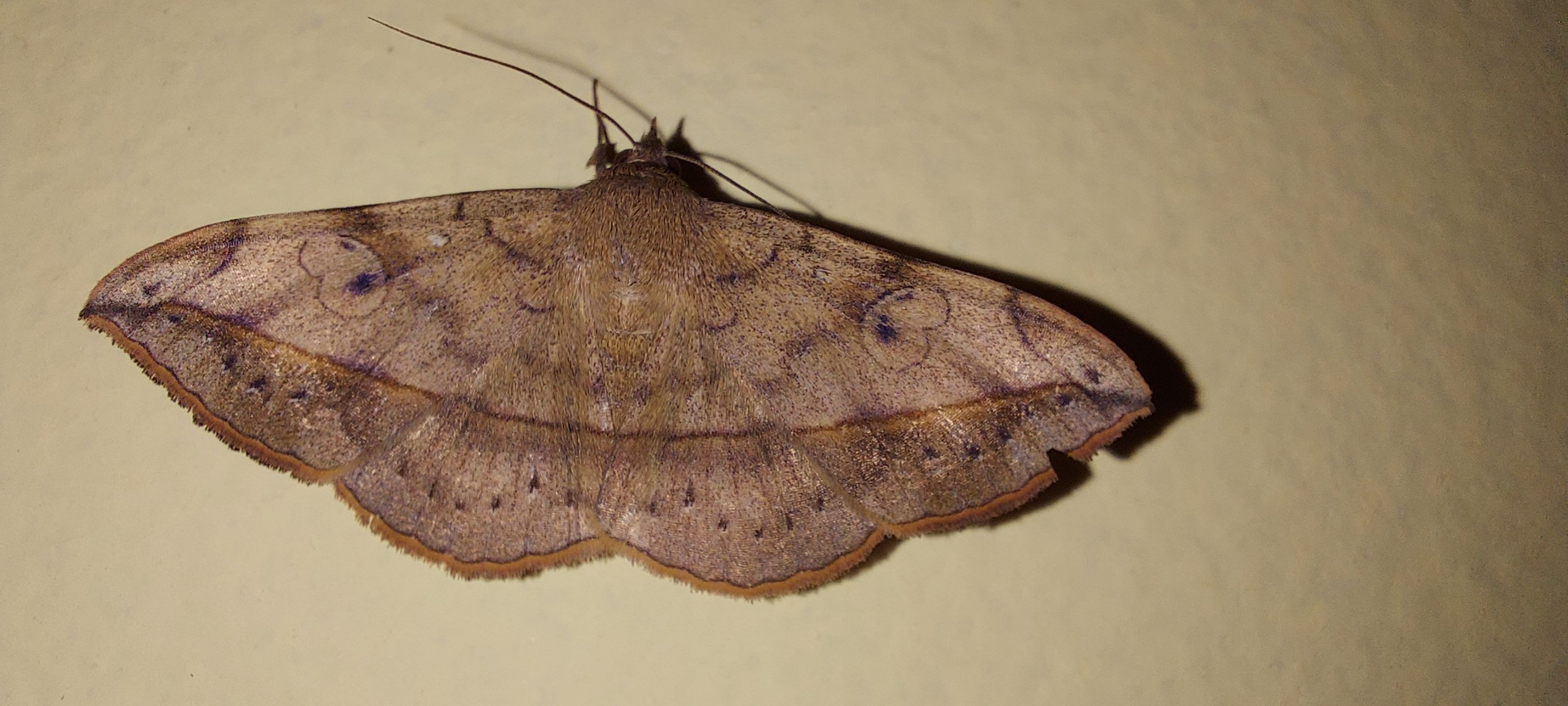

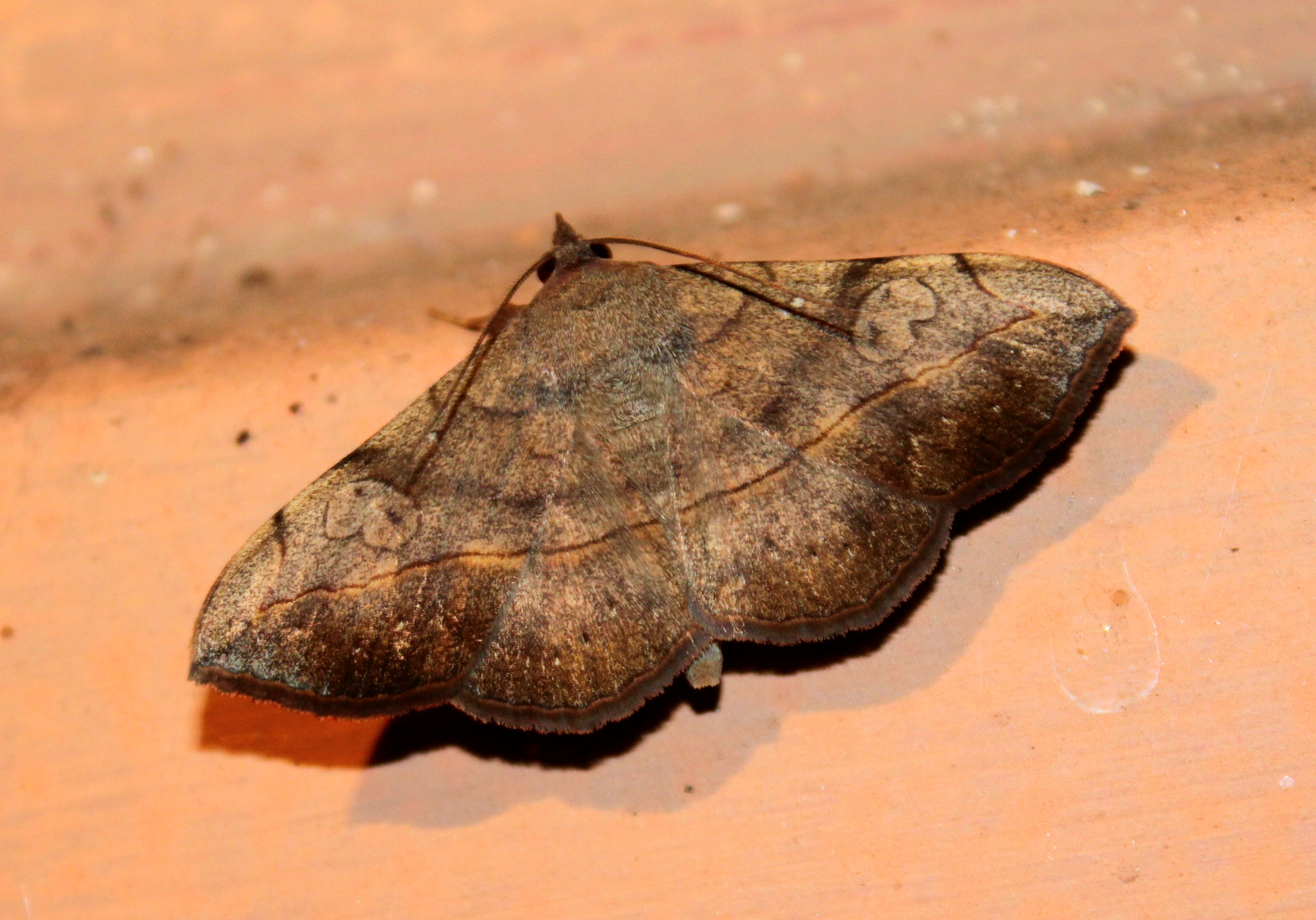

Scientific classification
- Kingdom: Animalia
- Phylum: Arthropoda
- Class: Insecta
- Order: Lepidoptera
- Superfamily: Noctuoidea
- Family: Erebidae
- Genus: Anticarsia
- Species: A. irrorata

Binomial name
- Anticarsia irrorata (Fabricius, 1781)

Synonyms
- Noctua irrorata Fabricius, 1781; Noctua sordida Fabricius, 1794; Apistis jocosa Hübner, [1823] 1816; Ophiusa rubricans Boisduval, 1833; Thermesia transducta Walker, 1865; Thermesia consueta Walker, 1869

= Anticarsia irrorata =

Species of moth

Anticarsia irrorata, the owl moth, is a species of moth in the family Noctuidae. It is native to the Old World tropics.

== Description ==
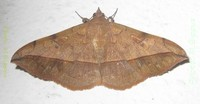

Its wingspan is about 40–46 mm. Palpi with third joint rather shorter than in the typical section. Male lack tufts on tibia. Hindwings with normal neuration in male, with no fold in inner margin. Antennae of male with bristles and cilia. It is light brownish with darker areas distally. The forewing is marked with a diagonal line and a row of black dots. The hindwing has similar markings. The underside has lighter, brownish dots and a white spot. The larva is light green. It has a dorsal line which is dark green with a yellowish center, and wider, spotted lines on either side. The spiracles are white with black edges. It moves in a looping motion.

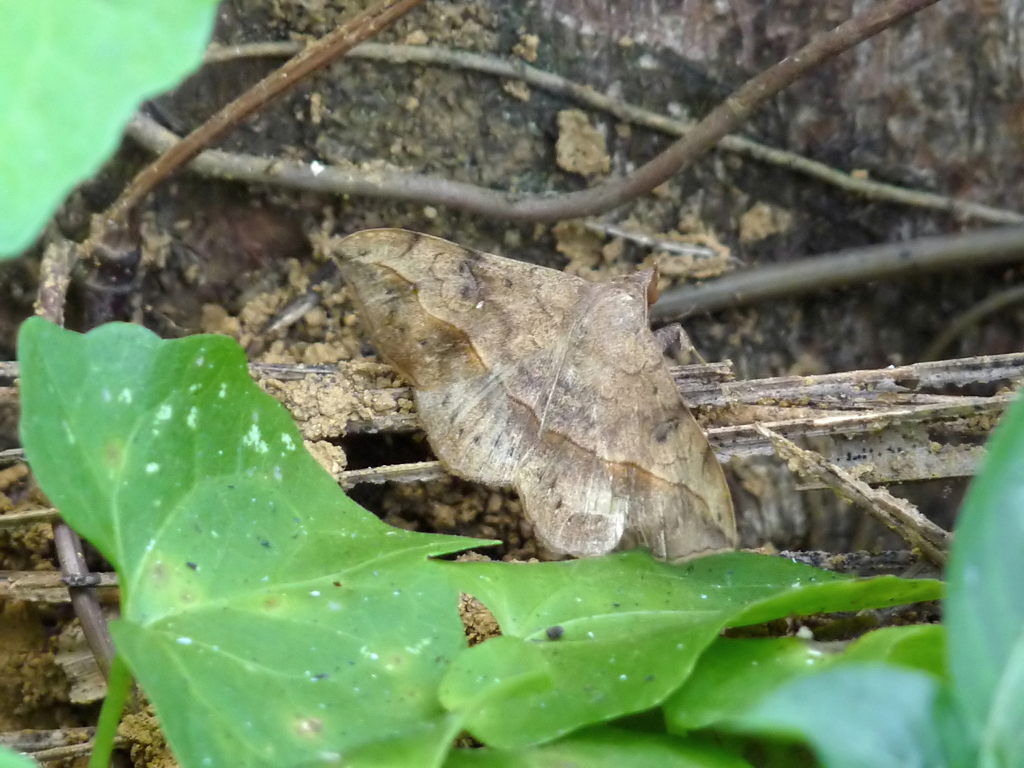
Anticarsia irrorata in Kerala, India

== Ecology ==
Common food plants include species from many legume genera, including Cajanus, Cicer, Cyamopsis, Glycine, Lablab, Mucuna, Phaseolus, and Vigna. It has also been noted on the melon genus Cucumis, and grasses such as Andropogon, Oryza, Paspalum, and Saccharum.
