= Argidia subvelata =

Scientific classification
- Kingdom: Animalia
- Phylum: Arthropoda
- Class: Insecta
- Order: Lepidoptera
- Superfamily: Noctuoidea
- Family: Noctuidae (?)
- Genus: Argidia
- Species: A. subvelata

Binomial name
- Argidia subvelata (Walker, 1865)

Synonyms
- Hypenaria subvelata Walker, 1865; Argidia cubana Herrich-Schäffer, 1869; Argidia aufidia Schaus, 1912

Species of moth

Argidia subvelata is a moth of the family Noctuidae first described by Francis Walker in 1865. It is found in Mexico, Costa Rica, Puerto Rico, Cuba and Brazil.
