= Airamia =

Scientific classification
- Kingdom: Animalia
- Phylum: Arthropoda
- Clade: Pancrustacea
- Class: Insecta
- Order: Lepidoptera
- Superfamily: Noctuoidea
- Family: Noctuidae
- Subfamily: Condicinae
- Genus: Airamia; Barnes & Benjamin, 1926
- Species: A. albiocula

Binomial name
- Airamia albiocula (Barnes & McDunnough, 1918)

Genus of moths

Airamia is a monotypic moth genus of the family Noctuidae. Its only species, Airamia albiocula, is known from the US state of California. Both the genus and species were first described by William Barnes and Foster Hendrickson Benjamin, the genus in 1926 and the species in 1918.
