= Arsaciodes =

Scientific classification
- Domain: Eukaryota
- Kingdom: Animalia
- Phylum: Arthropoda
- Class: Insecta
- Order: Lepidoptera
- Superfamily: Noctuoidea
- Family: Noctuidae (?)
- Subfamily: Catocalinae
- Genus: Arsaciodes; Schaus, 1912
- Species: A. rufa

Binomial name
- Arsaciodes rufa Schaus, 1912

Genus of moths

Arsaciodes is a monotypic moth genus of the family Noctuidae. Its only species, Arsaciodes rufa, is found in Costa Rica. Both the genus and the species were first described by William Schaus in 1912.
