= Atopomorpha =

Scientific classification
- Domain: Eukaryota
- Kingdom: Animalia
- Phylum: Arthropoda
- Class: Insecta
- Order: Lepidoptera
- Superfamily: Noctuoidea
- Family: Erebidae
- Subfamily: Hypeninae
- Genus: Atopomorpha; Warren, 1889
- Species: A. singularis

Binomial name
- Atopomorpha singularis Warren, 1889

Genus of moths

Atopomorpha is a monotypic moth genus of the family Erebidae. Its only species, Atopomorpha singularis, is known from the Brazilian state of Pará. Both the genus and the species were first described by Warren in 1889.
