= Acanthermia =

Scientific classification
- Kingdom: Animalia
- Phylum: Arthropoda
- Class: Insecta
- Order: Lepidoptera
- Superfamily: Noctuoidea
- Family: Erebidae
- Subfamily: Calpinae
- Genus: Acanthermia; Hampson, 1926

Genus of moths

Acanthermia is a genus of moths of the family Noctuidae.

== Species ==
- Acanthermia anubis
- Acanthermia atomosa
- Acanthermia atriluna
- Acanthermia basimochla
- Acanthermia bathildes
- Acanthermia brunnea
- Acanthermia carbonelli
- Acanthermia concatenalis
- Acanthermia didactica
- Acanthermia discata
- Acanthermia dyari Hampson, 1926
- Acanthermia guttata
- Acanthermia hebes
- Acanthermia incisura
- Acanthermia inculta
- Acanthermia infraalba
- Acanthermia insulsa
- Acanthermia iphis
- Acanthermia juvenis
- Acanthermia latris
- Acanthermia librata
- Acanthermia longistriata
- Acanthermia madrina
- Acanthermia medara
- Acanthermia mediana
- Acanthermia missionum
- Acanthermia modesta
- Acanthermia nigripalpis
- Acanthermia orthogonia
- Acanthermia palearis
- Acanthermia pallida
- Acanthermia paloma
- Acanthermia pantina
- Acanthermia parca
- Acanthermia perfasciata
- Acanthermia pupillata
- Acanthermia regia
- Acanthermia renicula
- Acanthermia sabata
- Acanthermia samia
- Acanthermia stigmaphiles
- Acanthermia stigmatica
- Acanthermia subclara
- Acanthermia taltula
- Acanthermia umbrata
- Acanthermia valida
- Acanthermia velutipuncta
- Acanthermia xanthopterygia
