= Acidaliodes =

Scientific classification
- Kingdom: Animalia
- Phylum: Arthropoda
- Class: Insecta
- Order: Lepidoptera
- Superfamily: Noctuoidea
- Family: Noctuidae
- Subfamily: Acontiinae
- Genus: Acidaliodes; Hampson, 1910

Genus of moths

Acidaliodes is a genus of moths of the family Noctuidae. The genus was erected by George Hampson in 1910.

== Species ==
- Acidaliodes atripuncta Hampson, 1910 Brazil (Espiritu Santo)
- Acidaliodes celenna (Druce, 1892) Guatemala
- Acidaliodes costipuncta Hampson, 1911 Peru
- Acidaliodes enona (Druce, 1892) Mexico
- Acidaliodes excisa Hampson, 1910 Colombia
- Acidaliodes flavipars Dyar, 1914 Panama
- Acidaliodes infantilis Schaus, 1912 Costa Rica
- Acidaliodes irrorata Hampson, 1918 Peru
- Acidaliodes lycaugesia Hampson, 1910 Brazil (Amazonas)
- Acidaliodes mela Dyar, 1914 Panama
- Acidaliodes melasticta Hampson, 1914 New Guinea
- Acidaliodes perstriata (Hampson, 1907) Sri Lanka
- Acidaliodes strenualis Hampson, 1914 Borneo
- Acidaliodes truncata Hampson, 1910 Panama
- Acidaliodes umber Dyar, 1914 Panama
- Acidaliodes zattu Schaus, 1911 Costa Rica
