= Arenarba =

Scientific classification
- Kingdom: Animalia
- Phylum: Arthropoda
- Clade: Pancrustacea
- Class: Insecta
- Order: Lepidoptera
- Superfamily: Noctuoidea
- Family: Noctuidae
- Subfamily: Acontiinae
- Genus: Arenarba; Berio, 1950

Genus of moths

Arenarba is a genus of moths in the family Noctuidae, established by Emilio Berio in 1950.

== Species ==
- Arenarba arenacea (Hampson, 1893) Sri Lanka
- Arenarba destituta (Moore, [1884]) Sri Lanka, to Yemen (Socotra)
