= Apustis =

Scientific classification
- Domain: Eukaryota
- Kingdom: Animalia
- Phylum: Arthropoda
- Class: Insecta
- Order: Lepidoptera
- Superfamily: Noctuoidea
- Family: Erebidae
- Genus: Apustis
- Species: A. sabulosa

Binomial name
- Apustis sabulosa Schaus, 1913

Monotypic genus of moths

Apustis is a monotypic moth genus of the family Erebidae. Its only species, Apustis sabulosa, is found in Costa Rica. Both the genus and species were first described by William Schaus in 1913.
