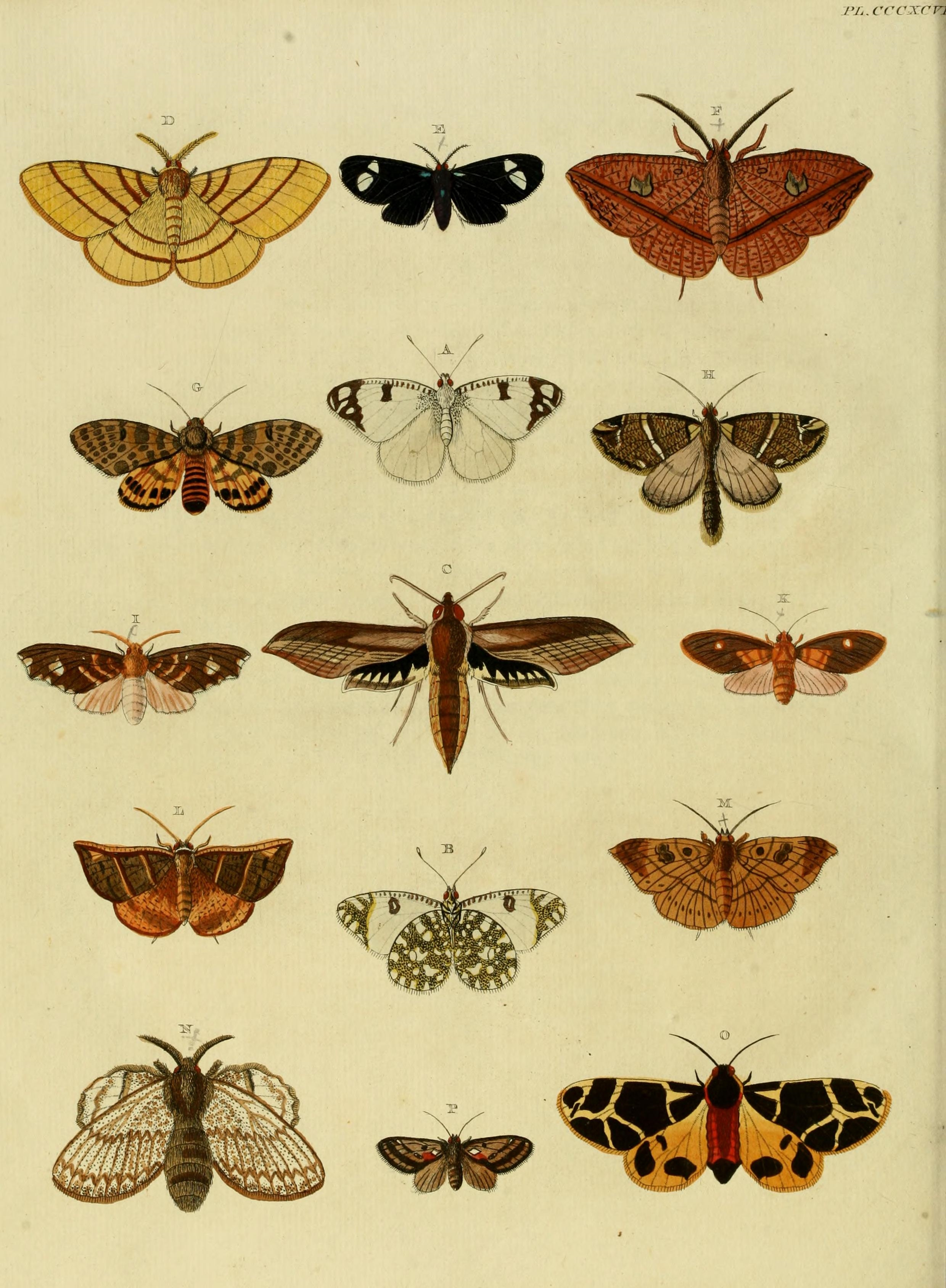

Scientific classification
- Domain: Eukaryota
- Kingdom: Animalia
- Phylum: Arthropoda
- Class: Insecta
- Order: Lepidoptera
- Superfamily: Noctuoidea
- Family: Noctuidae (?)
- Subfamily: Catocalinae
- Genus: Argidia; Guenee, 1852

Synonyms
- Azirista Walker, 1858

= Argidia =

Genus of moths

Argidia is a genus of moths of the family Noctuidae.

== Species ==
- Argidia aganippe Felder & Rogenhofer 1874
- Argidia alonia Schaus 1940
- Argidia azania Schaus 1940
- Argidia discios Hampson 1926
- Argidia hypopyra Hampson 1926
- Argidia hypoxantha Hampson 1926
- Argidia palmipes Guenee 1852
- Argidia penicillata Moschler 1886
- Argidia rosacea Butler 1879
- Argidia rufa Schaus 1912
- Argidia subapicata Schaus 1901
- Argidia subnebulosa Maassen 1890
- Argidia subrubra Felder & Rogenhofer 1874
- Argidia subvelata (Walker 1865)
- Argidia suprema Schaus 1912
- Argidia tarchon (Cramer 1777)
- Argidia tomyris (Cramer 1779)
- Argidia wedelina (Stoll 1782)
