= Alpesa =

Scientific classification
- Kingdom: Animalia
- Phylum: Arthropoda
- Class: Insecta
- Order: Lepidoptera
- Superfamily: Noctuoidea
- Family: Noctuidae
- Genus: Alpesa

Genus of moths

Alpesa was a genus of moths of the family Noctuidae. It is now considered a synonym of Elaphria.
