= Alelimma =

Scientific classification
- Kingdom: Animalia
- Phylum: Arthropoda
- Class: Insecta
- Order: Lepidoptera
- Superfamily: Noctuoidea
- Family: Noctuidae
- Genus: Alelimma; Hampson, 1895

Synonyms
- Hepsidera Swinhoe, 1902; Pexipogo Hampson

Genus of moths

Alelimma is a genus of moths of the family Erebidae. The genus was erected by George Hampson in 1895.

== Species ==
- Alelimma apicalis (Hampson, 1895) Myanmar
- Alelimma ochreofusca Holloway, 2008 Borneo, Philippines
- Alelimma pallicostalis Hampson, 1902 southern Africa
- Alelimma pallidifusca Hampson, 1895 north-eastern Himalayas, Thailand, Peninsular Malaysia, Borneo, Sangihe, Sulawesi
- Alelimma zema Strand, 1920 Taiwan
- Alelimma zemsella Strand, 1920 Taiwan
