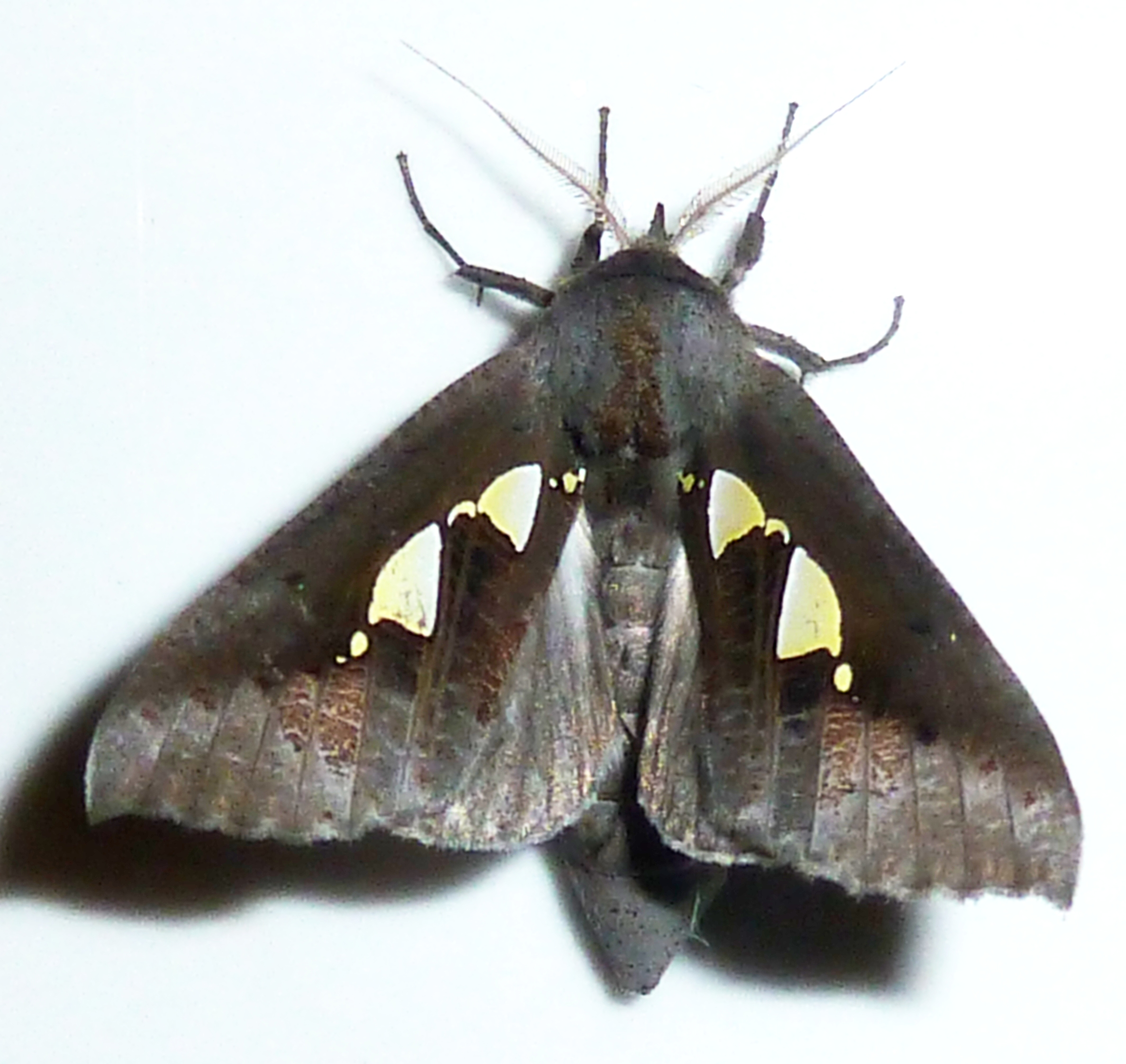
- A. bracteata

Scientific classification
- Kingdom: Animalia
- Phylum: Arthropoda
- Clade: Pancrustacea
- Class: Insecta
- Order: Lepidoptera
- Superfamily: Noctuoidea
- Family: Erebidae
- Subfamily: Calpinae
- Genus: Antiophlebia; Felder, 1874

= Antiophlebia =

Genus of moths

Antiophlebia is a genus of moths of the family Erebidae, subfamily Calpinae.

== Species ==
- Antiophlebia bourgognei Laporte, 1975 (syn.jun. of A.bracteata)
- Antiophlebia bracteata Felder, 1874 (from South Africa thru Ethiopia)
- Antiophlebia griveaudi Viette, 1966 (from Madagascar)
