= Achaeops =

Scientific classification
- Kingdom: Animalia
- Phylum: Arthropoda
- Clade: Pancrustacea
- Class: Insecta
- Order: Lepidoptera
- Superfamily: Noctuoidea
- Family: Erebidae
- Subfamily: Calpinae
- Genus: Achaeops; Hampson, 1926

Genus of moths

Achaeops is a monotypic moth genus of the family Noctuidae. Its only species, Achaeops esperanza, was first described by Schaus in 1911. It is found in Central America.
