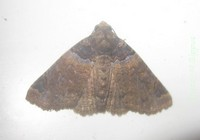

Scientific classification
- Kingdom: Animalia
- Phylum: Arthropoda
- Class: Insecta
- Order: Lepidoptera
- Superfamily: Noctuoidea
- Family: Noctuidae (?)
- Subfamily: Catocalinae
- Genus: Argyrolopha; Hampson, 1914

= Argyrolopha =

Genus of moths

Argyrolopha is a genus of moths of the family Erebidae.

== Species ==
- Argyrolopha costibarbata Hampson, 1914
- Argyrolopha punctilinea Prout, 1921
- Argyrolopha trisignata (Mabille, 1900)
