= Aniana =

Scientific classification
- Kingdom: Animalia
- Phylum: Arthropoda
- Class: Insecta
- Order: Lepidoptera
- Superfamily: Noctuoidea
- Family: Noctuidae (?)
- Subfamily: Catocalinae
- Genus: Aniana; Walker, 1866
- Species: A. straminealis

Binomial name
- Aniana straminealis Walker, 1866

Genus of moths

Aniana is a monotypic moth genus of the family Noctuidae. Its only species, Aniana straminealis, is found in Brazil. Both the genus and the species were first described by Francis Walker in 1866.
