= Aglossostola =

Scientific classification
- Kingdom: Animalia
- Phylum: Arthropoda
- Class: Insecta
- Order: Lepidoptera
- Superfamily: Noctuoidea
- Family: Erebidae
- Subfamily: Calpinae
- Genus: Aglossostola; Hampson, 1926

Genus of moths

Aglossostola is a genus of moths of the family Noctuidae.

== Species ==
- Aglossostola diana (Schaus, 1904)
