= Asylaea =

Scientific classification
- Kingdom: Animalia
- Phylum: Arthropoda
- Class: Insecta
- Order: Lepidoptera
- Superfamily: Noctuoidea
- Family: Erebidae
- Subfamily: Hypeninae
- Genus: Asylaea; Möschler, 1883
- Species: A. inflexa

Binomial name
- Asylaea inflexa Möschler, 1883

Genus of moth

Asylaea is a monotypic moth genus of the family Erebidae. Its only species, Asylaea inflexa, is known from Suriname. Both the genus and the species were first described by Heinrich Benno Möschler in 1883.
