= Achytonix =

Scientific classification
- Kingdom: Animalia
- Phylum: Arthropoda
- Class: Insecta
- Order: Lepidoptera
- Superfamily: Noctuoidea
- Family: Noctuidae
- Subfamily: Noctuinae
- Genus: Achytonix; McDunnough, 1937

Genus of moths

Achytonix is a genus of moths of the family Noctuidae.

== Former species ==
- Achytonix epipaschia is now Cosmia epipaschia (Grote, 1883)
- Achytonix praeacuta is now Cosmia praeacuta (Smith, 1894)
