= Athurmodes =

Scientific classification
- Domain: Eukaryota
- Kingdom: Animalia
- Phylum: Arthropoda
- Class: Insecta
- Order: Lepidoptera
- Superfamily: Noctuoidea
- Family: Erebidae
- Subfamily: Hypeninae
- Genus: Athurmodes; Dognin, 1914

species
- A. spreta Dognin, 1914

Genus of moths

Athurmodes is a monotypic moth genus of the family Erebidae. Its only species, Athurmodes spreta, is known from Colombia. Both the genus and the species were first described by Paul Dognin in 1914.
