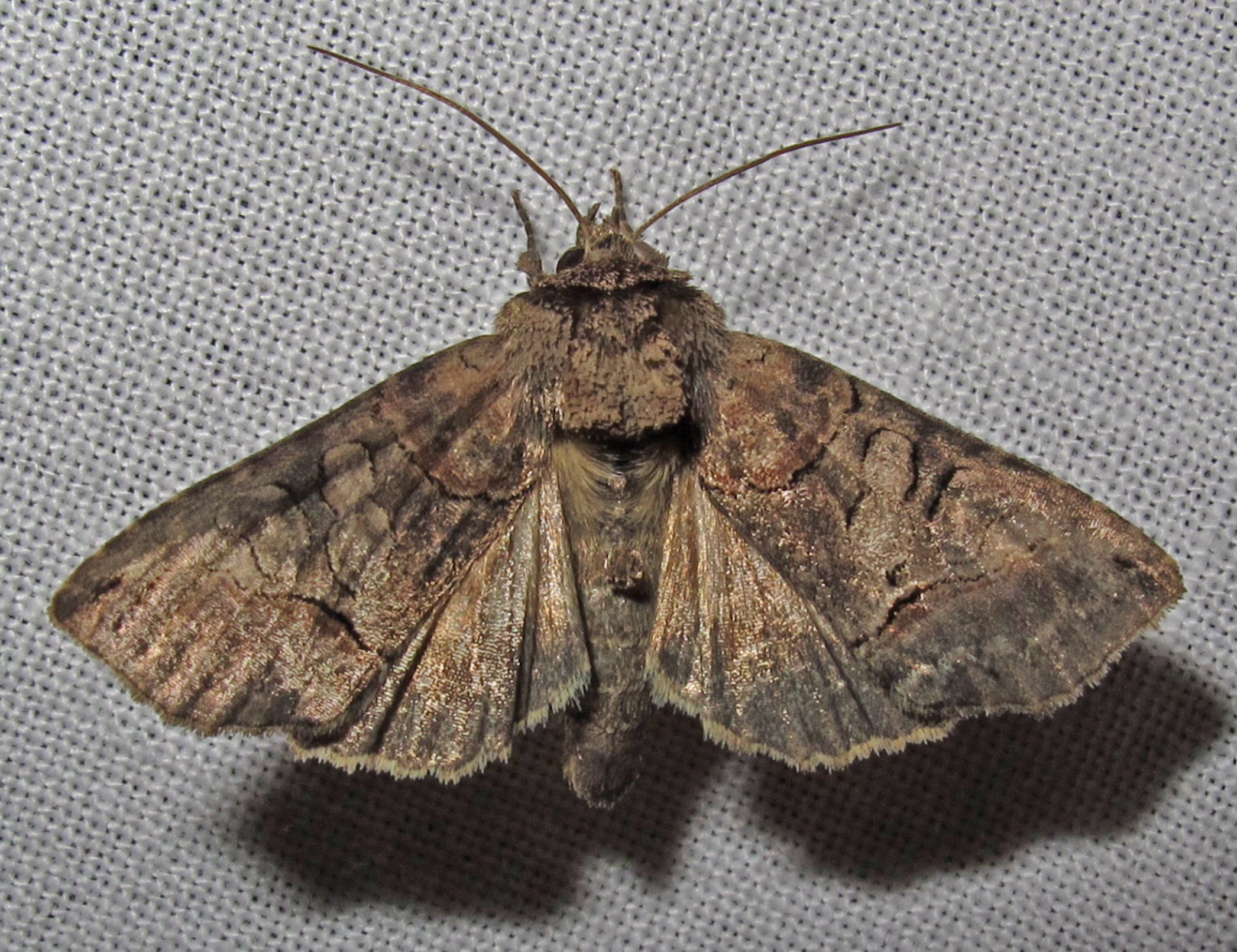
- Abrostola urentis

Scientific classification
- Domain: Eukaryota
- Kingdom: Animalia
- Phylum: Arthropoda
- Class: Insecta
- Order: Lepidoptera
- Superfamily: Noctuoidea
- Family: Noctuidae
- Genus: Arbostola; Dyar, 1921

= Arbostola =

Genus of moths

Arbostola is a genus of moths of the family Noctuidae.

== Species ==
- Arbostola adrana Druce, 1889
- Arbostola heuritica Dyar, 1921
- Arbostola viridis Druce, 1900
