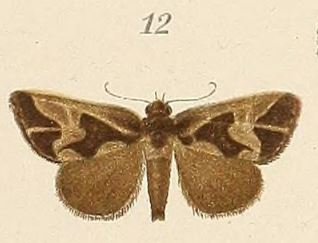
- Agamana inscripta

Scientific classification
- Kingdom: Animalia
- Phylum: Arthropoda
- Class: Insecta
- Order: Lepidoptera
- Superfamily: Noctuoidea
- Family: Erebidae
- Subfamily: Calpinae
- Genus: Agamana; Walker, [1866]

Synonyms
- Parafodina Hampson, 1926

= Agamana =

Genus of moths

Agamana is a genus of moths of the family Erebidae. The genus was erected by Francis Walker in 1866. These moths are mainly found in the Australian continent and Indian subcontinent. These are not considered very rare, but very little is known about these species.

== Species ==
- Agamana aldabrana (Fryer, 1912) Aldabra
- Agamana andriai (Viette, 1966) Madagascar
- Agamana callixeris (Lower, 1903) Queensland
- Agamana cavatalis Walker, [1866] Australia
- Agamana conjungens (Walker, 1858)
- Agamana delphinensis (Viette, 1966) Madagascar
- Agamana ectrogia (Hampson, 1926) Sierra Leone, southern Nigeria, South Africa
- Agamana goniosema (Hampson, 1926) Sikkim
- Agamana inscripta (Pagenstecher, 1907) Madagascar
- Agamana iselaea (Viette, 1958) Madagascar
- Agamana pagenstecheri (Viette, 1968) Madagascar
- Agamana pentagonalis (Butler, 1894) Kenya, Tanzania, Zambia, South Africa
- Agamana pergrata (Turner, 1933) northern Queensland
- Agamana sambirano (Viette, 1966) Madagascar
- Agamana sarmentosa (Felder & Rogenhofer, 1874) Australia
