= Artiloxis =

Scientific classification
- Domain: Eukaryota
- Kingdom: Animalia
- Phylum: Arthropoda
- Class: Insecta
- Order: Lepidoptera
- Superfamily: Noctuoidea
- Family: Noctuidae (?)
- Subfamily: Catocalinae
- Genus: Artiloxis; Schaus, 1913
- Species: A. vitiosa

Binomial name
- Artiloxis vitiosa Schaus, 1913

Genus of moths

Artiloxis is a monotypic moth genus of the family Noctuidae. Its only species, Artiloxis vitiosa, is found in Costa Rica. Both the genus and species were first described by William Schaus in 1913.
