= Ablita =

Scientific classification
- Domain: Eukaryota
- Kingdom: Animalia
- Phylum: Arthropoda
- Class: Insecta
- Order: Lepidoptera
- Superfamily: Noctuoidea
- Family: Noctuidae
- Genus: Ablita; Dyar, 1914

Genus of moths

Ablita is a genus of moths of the family Noctuidae.

== Species ==
- Ablita adin (Schaus, 1911)
- Ablita grammalogica Dyar, 1914
- Ablita nymphica Dyar, 1914
