= Antha =

Scientific classification
- Kingdom: Animalia
- Phylum: Arthropoda
- Clade: Pancrustacea
- Class: Insecta
- Order: Lepidoptera
- Superfamily: Noctuoidea
- Family: Noctuidae
- Tribe: Hadenini
- Genus: Antha; Staudinger, 1892

Synonyms
- [?] Anodontodes Hampson, 1895 but see Ronkay, Ronkay & Landry, 2023

Genus of moths

Antha is a genus of moths of the family Noctuidae. The genus was described by Staudinger in 1892.

== Species ==
- Antha descombesi Ronkay, Ronkay & Landry, 2023 - Taiwan
- Antha danielbartschi Ronkay, Ronkay & Landry, 2023 - China (Hunan)
- Antha grata (Butler, 1881) - Japan, Far East

May include:

- Antha rotunda (Hampson, 1895) else under Anodontodes
- Antha magna Hreblay, Katona & Tóth, 2023 else under Megaantha
