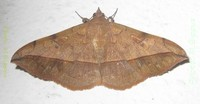

Scientific classification
- Kingdom: Animalia
- Phylum: Arthropoda
- Clade: Pancrustacea
- Class: Insecta
- Order: Lepidoptera
- Superfamily: Noctuoidea
- Family: Erebidae
- Subfamily: Eulepidotinae
- Genus: Anticarsia; Hübner, 1818

Synonyms
- Azazia Walker, 1858

= Anticarsia =

Genus of moths

Anticarsia is a genus of moths of the family Erebidae. The genus was erected by Jacob Hübner in 1818.

== Species ==
- Anticarsia acutilinea (Walker, 1865)
- Anticarsia albilineata Hampson, 1926
- Anticarsia anisospila (Walker, 1869)
- Anticarsia disticha Hampson, 1926
- Anticarsia distorta Hampson, 1926
- Anticarsia gemmatalis Hübner, 1818 – velvetbean moth
- Anticarsia irrorata (Fabricius, 1781)
- Anticarsia parana (Guenée, 1852)
- Anticarsia renipunctum (Berio, 1977)
- Anticarsia suffervens Dyar, 1920
- Anticarsia tigris (Berio, 1977)
- Anticarsia unilineata Gaede, 1940
