= Aphorisma =

Scientific classification
- Kingdom: Animalia
- Phylum: Arthropoda
- Class: Insecta
- Order: Lepidoptera
- Superfamily: Noctuoidea
- Family: Erebidae
- Subfamily: Hypeninae
- Genus: Aphorisma; Hampson, 1898
- Species: A. albistriata

Binomial name
- Aphorisma albistriata Hampson, 1898

Genus of moths

Aphorisma is a monotypic moth genus of the family Erebidae. Its only species, Aphorisma albistriata, is found in the Indian state of Meghalaya. Both the genus and the species were first described by George Hampson in 1898.
