= Acropserotarache =

Scientific classification
- Domain: Eukaryota
- Kingdom: Animalia
- Phylum: Arthropoda
- Class: Insecta
- Order: Lepidoptera
- Superfamily: Noctuoidea
- Family: Noctuidae
- Subfamily: Acontiinae
- Genus: Acropserotarache; Berio, 1937

Type species
- Acropserotarache elegantissima Berio, 1937

Genus of moths

Acropserotarache is considered by Butterflies and Moths of the World to be a genus of moths of the family Noctuidae erected by Emilio Berio in 1937. It is considered to be a synonym of Acontia Ochsenheimer, 1816 by The Global Lepidoptera Names Index. Lepidoptera and Some Other Life Forms gives the name as a synonym of Emmelia Hübner, [1821].
