= Asiccia =

Scientific classification
- Kingdom: Animalia
- Phylum: Arthropoda
- Class: Insecta
- Order: Lepidoptera
- Superfamily: Noctuoidea
- Family: Noctuidae (?)
- Subfamily: Catocalinae
- Genus: Asiccia; Hampson, 1926
- Species: A. lithosiana

Binomial name
- Asiccia lithosiana Hampson, 1926

Genus of moths

Asiccia is a monotypic moth genus of the family Noctuidae. Its only species, Asiccia lithosiana, is found in India. Both the genus and species were first described by George Hampson in 1926.
