= Abseudrapa =

Scientific classification
- Domain: Eukaryota
- Kingdom: Animalia
- Phylum: Arthropoda
- Class: Insecta
- Order: Lepidoptera
- Superfamily: Noctuoidea
- Family: Erebidae
- Subfamily: Calpinae
- Genus: Abseudrapa; Berio, 1956

Genus of moths

Abseudrapa is a genus of moths of the family Noctuidae.

== Species ==
- Abseudrapa metaphaeria (Walker, 1869)
