= Astha =

Scientific classification
- Kingdom: Animalia
- Phylum: Arthropoda
- Class: Insecta
- Order: Lepidoptera
- Superfamily: Noctuoidea
- Family: Noctuidae (?)
- Subfamily: Catocalinae
- Genus: Astha; Walker, 1865
- Species: A. spectabilis

Binomial name
- Astha spectabilis Walker, 1865

Genus of moths

Astha is a monotypic moth genus of the family Noctuidae. Its only species is Astha spectabilis. Both the genus and the species were first described by Francis Walker in 1865. The type location is unknown.
