= Andrianam =

Scientific classification
- Kingdom: Animalia
- Phylum: Arthropoda
- Class: Insecta
- Order: Lepidoptera
- Superfamily: Noctuoidea
- Family: Noctuidae (?)
- Subfamily: Catocalinae
- Genus: Andrianam; Viette, 1954
- Species: A. poinimerina

Binomial name
- Andrianam poinimerina Viette, 1954

Genus of moths

Andrianam is a monotypic moth genus of the family Noctuidae. Its only species, Andrianam poinimerina, is known from Madagascar. Both the genus and species were first described by Pierre Viette in 1954.
