= Aggustiana =

Scientific classification
- Domain: Eukaryota
- Kingdom: Animalia
- Phylum: Arthropoda
- Class: Insecta
- Order: Lepidoptera
- Superfamily: Noctuoidea
- Family: Erebidae
- Subfamily: Calpinae
- Genus: Aggustiana; Schaus, 1916

Genus of moths

Aggustiana is a genus of moths of the family Noctuidae.

== Species ==
- Aggustiana fragilalis Schaus, 1916
- Aggustiana guards (Schaus, 1904)
- Aggustiana intermedia (Druce, 1898)
- Aggustiana libitina (Druce, 1890)
- Aggustiana limaea (Druce, 1890)
- Aggustiana mox (Dyar, 1914)
- Aggustiana nigripalpis (Druce, 1898)
- Aggustiana undilinea (Schaus, 1913)
