= Aphypena =

Scientific classification
- Domain: Eukaryota
- Kingdom: Animalia
- Phylum: Arthropoda
- Class: Insecta
- Order: Lepidoptera
- Superfamily: Noctuoidea
- Family: Noctuidae (?)
- Subfamily: Catocalinae
- Genus: Aphypena; C. Swinhoe, 1901

Genus of moths

Aphypena is a genus of moths of the family Noctuidae. The genus was erected by Charles Swinhoe in 1901.

== Species ==
- Aphypena exhibens Walker, [1863]
- Aphypena violacea Holloway, 2005
