= Araeopterella =

Scientific classification
- Kingdom: Animalia
- Phylum: Arthropoda
- Class: Insecta
- Order: Lepidoptera
- Superfamily: Noctuoidea
- Family: Noctuidae
- Subfamily: Acontiinae
- Genus: Araeopterella; Dyar, 1914
- Species: A. miscidisce

Binomial name
- Araeopterella miscidisce Dyar, 1914

Genus of moths

Araeopterella is a monotypic moth genus of the family Noctuidae. Its only species, Araeopterella miscidisce, is found in Panama. Both the genus and species were first described by Harrison Gray Dyar Jr. in 1914.

Note: Another taxon Araeopterella Fibiger & Hacker, 2001, is a(n unreplaced) junior homonym. That is more recently treated as a junior subjective synonym of Araeopteron Hampson, 1893. Its type species Araeopterella sterrhaoides Fibiger & Hacker, 2001 is later Araeopteron sterrhaoides (Fibiger & Hacker, 2001).
