= Aneliopis =

Scientific classification
- Domain: Eukaryota
- Kingdom: Animalia
- Phylum: Arthropoda
- Class: Insecta
- Order: Lepidoptera
- Superfamily: Noctuoidea
- Family: Erebidae
- Subfamily: Hypeninae
- Genus: Aneliopis; Bethune-Baker, 1908

Genus of moths

Aneliopis is a genus of moths of the family Erebidae. The genus was erected by George Thomas Bethune-Baker in 1908. All the species are known from New Guinea.

== Species ==
- Aneliopis adelpha Bethune-Baker, 1908
- Aneliopis alampeta Bethune-Baker, 1908
- Aneliopis albipuncta Bethune-Baker, 1908
- Aneliopis trilineata Bethune-Baker, 1908
