= Anomocala =

Scientific classification
- Domain: Eukaryota
- Kingdom: Animalia
- Phylum: Arthropoda
- Class: Insecta
- Order: Lepidoptera
- Superfamily: Noctuoidea
- Family: Noctuidae (?)
- Subfamily: Catocalinae
- Genus: Anomocala; Tams, 1935
- Species: A. hopkinsi

Binomial name
- Anomocala hopkinsi Tams, 1935

Genus of moths

Anomocala is a monotypic moth genus of the family Noctuidae. Its only species, Anomocala hopkinsi, is known from Samoa. Both the genus and the species were first described by Tams in 1935.
