= Argyphia =

Scientific classification
- Domain: Eukaryota
- Kingdom: Animalia
- Phylum: Arthropoda
- Class: Insecta
- Order: Lepidoptera
- Superfamily: Noctuoidea
- Family: Noctuidae (?)
- Subfamily: Catocalinae
- Genus: Argyphia; Saalmuller, 1891
- Species: A. arcifera

Binomial name
- Argyphia arcifera (Mabille, 1881)

Synonyms
- Argyphia modesta Saalmüller, 1891; Argyphia ochroglene (Mabille, 1881); Argyphia pulverulenta Saalmüller, 1891; Argyphia torrida Saalmüller, 1891; Argyphia variana Oberthür, 1916

Genus of moths

Argyphia is a monotypic moth genus of the family Noctuidae described by Saalmuller in 1891. Its only species, Argyphia arcifera, was first described by Paul Mabille in 1881. It is found in Madagascar and the Comoros.
