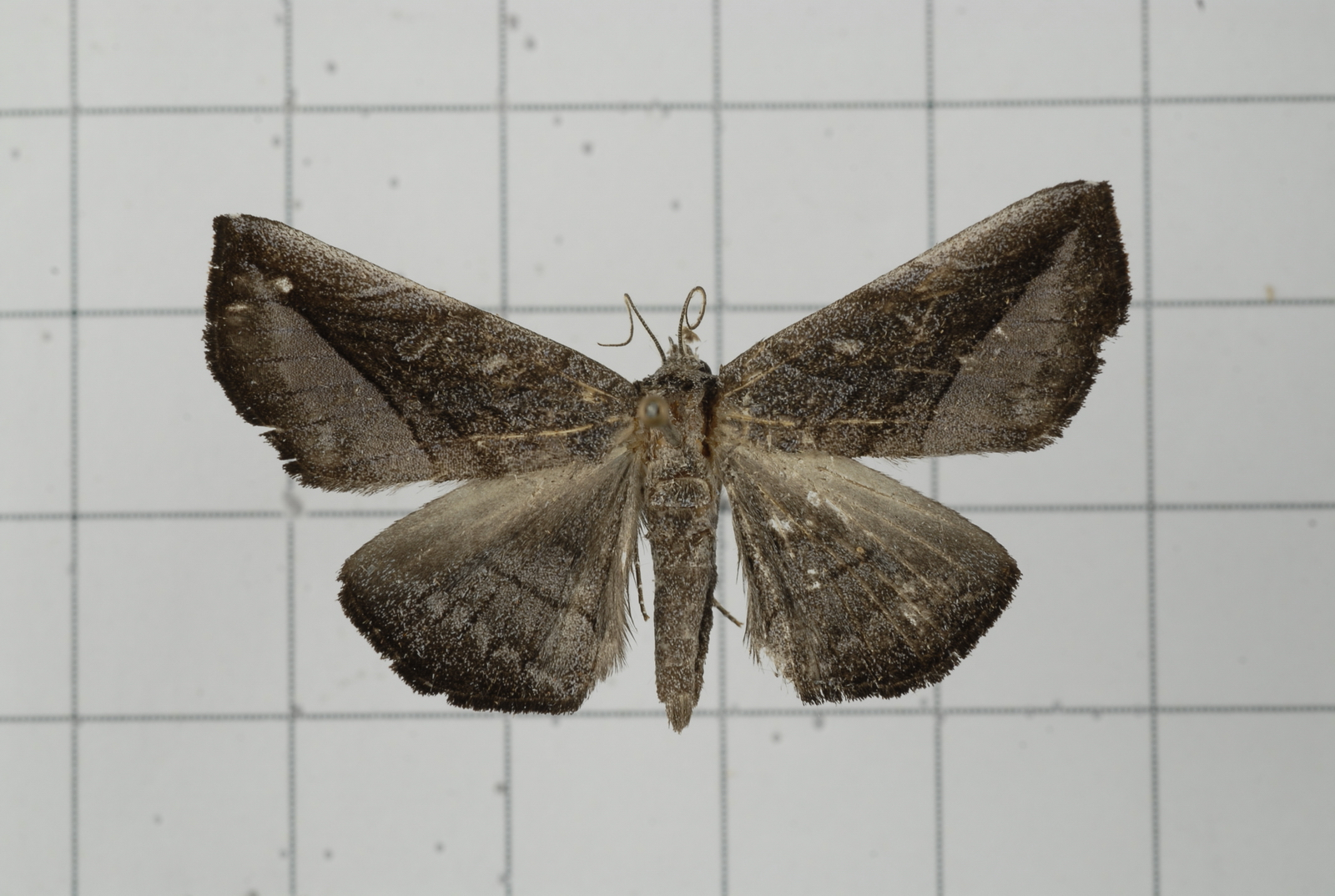

Scientific classification
- Kingdom: Animalia
- Phylum: Arthropoda
- Class: Insecta
- Order: Lepidoptera
- Superfamily: Noctuoidea
- Family: Noctuidae (?)
- Subfamily: Catocalinae
- Genus: Arytrurides; Hampson, 1926

= Arytrurides =

Genus of moths

Arytrurides is a genus of moths of the family Noctuidae.

== Species ==
- Arytrurides inornatus (Walker, 1865)
- Arytrurides sordidatus (Leech, 1900)
