= Agyra =

- Agyra agola

Scientific classification
- Kingdom: Animalia
- Phylum: Arthropoda
- Clade: Pancrustacea
- Class: Insecta
- Order: Lepidoptera
- Superfamily: Noctuoidea
- Family: Noctuidae (?)
- Subfamily: Catocalinae
- Genus: Agyra; Guenee, 1852

Synonyms
- Marthama Walker, 1858

Genus of moths

Agyra is a genus of moths in the family Noctuidae.

== Species ==
The following species are recognised in the genus Agyra:

- Agyra agola Druce, 1890
- Agyra conspersa Walker, 1862
- Agyra merchandi Guenee, 1852
- Agyra squamivaria Walker, 1858
