= Ancara =

Scientific classification
- Kingdom: Animalia
- Phylum: Arthropoda
- Class: Insecta
- Order: Lepidoptera
- Superfamily: Noctuoidea
- Family: Noctuidae
- Subfamily: Acronictinae
- Genus: Ancara; Walker, 1858

Synonyms
- Ancaroides Bethune-Baker, 1906

Genus of moths

Ancara is a genus of moths of the family Noctuidae. Species are found in India, Sri Lanka, Andaman Islands, and Borneo.

== Description ==
It is similar to the genus Euplexia, but differs from second joint of palpi reaching vertex of head and long third joint.

== Species ==
- Ancara anaemica Hampson, 1908
- Ancara conformis Warren, 1911
- Ancara consimilis Warren, 1913
- Ancara griseola (Bethune-Baker, 1906)
- Ancara kebea (Bethune-Baker, 1906)
- Ancara obliterans Walker, 1858
- Ancara plaesiosema Turner, 1943
- Ancara replicans Walker, 1858
- Ancara rubriviridis Warren, 1911
