= Asymbletia =

Scientific classification
- Domain: Eukaryota
- Kingdom: Animalia
- Phylum: Arthropoda
- Class: Insecta
- Order: Lepidoptera
- Superfamily: Noctuoidea
- Family: Noctuidae (?)
- Subfamily: Catocalinae
- Genus: Asymbletia; Herrich-Schaffer, 1856
- Species: A. dispar

Binomial name
- Asymbletia dispar Herrich-Schäffer, 1856

Genus of moths

Asymbletia is a monotypic moth genus of the family Noctuidae. Its only species, Asymbletia dispar, is found in equatorial South America. Both the genus and species were first described by Gottlieb August Wilhelm Herrich-Schäffer in 1856.
