= Ancistris =

Scientific classification
- Kingdom: Animalia
- Phylum: Arthropoda
- Class: Insecta
- Order: Lepidoptera
- Superfamily: Noctuoidea
- Family: Noctuidae (?)
- Subfamily: Catocalinae
- Genus: Ancistris; Mabille, 1897
- Species: A. saturnina

Binomial name
- Ancistris saturnina Mabille, 1897

Genus of moths

Ancistris is a monotypic moth genus of the family Noctuidae. Its only species, Ancistris saturnina, is known from Madagascar. Both the genus and the species were first described by Paul Mabille in 1897.
