= Acmana =

Scientific classification
- Domain: Eukaryota
- Kingdom: Animalia
- Phylum: Arthropoda
- Class: Insecta
- Order: Lepidoptera
- Superfamily: Noctuoidea
- Family: Erebidae
- Subfamily: Hypeninae
- Genus: Acmana; Schaus, 1916

Genus of moths

Acmana is a genus of moths of the family Erebidae. The genus was described by William Schaus in 1916.

== Species ==
- Acmana apicioides Schaus, 1916 Brazil (Paraná)
- Acmana moeonalis (Walker, 1859) Brazil
- Acmana paulina Schaus, 1916 Brazil (Rio de Janeiro)
