= Alinza =

Scientific classification
- Kingdom: Animalia
- Phylum: Arthropoda
- Class: Insecta
- Order: Lepidoptera
- Superfamily: Noctuoidea
- Family: Erebidae
- Subfamily: Hypeninae
- Genus: Alinza; Walker, [1866]

Genus of moths

Alinza is a genus of moths of the family Erebidae. The genus was erected by Francis Walker in 1866.

- Alinza banianoides Schaus, 1916 French Guiana
- Alinza cumana Schaus, 1916 Brazil (São Paulo)
- Alinza discessalis Walker, [1866] Brazil (Amazonas)
