= Anorena =

Scientific classification
- Kingdom: Animalia
- Phylum: Arthropoda
- Class: Insecta
- Order: Lepidoptera
- Superfamily: Noctuoidea
- Family: Noctuidae (?)
- Subfamily: Catocalinae
- Genus: Anorena; Schaus, 1914

Genus of moths

Anorena is a genus of moths of the family Noctuidae.

== Species ==
- Anorena hyrtacides Schaus, 1914
- Anorena melie (Schaus, 1912)
