= Aventiola =

Scientific classification
- Kingdom: Animalia
- Phylum: Arthropoda
- Clade: Pancrustacea
- Class: Insecta
- Order: Lepidoptera
- Superfamily: Noctuoidea
- Family: Erebidae
- Subfamily: Hypeninae
- Genus: Aventiola; Staudinger, 1892
- Species: A. pusilla

Binomial name
- Aventiola pusilla (Butler, 1879)

Synonyms
- Egnasia pusilla Butler, 1879; Aventiola maculifera Staudinger, 1892; Sacara nigripalpis Hirayama, 1937

Genus of moths

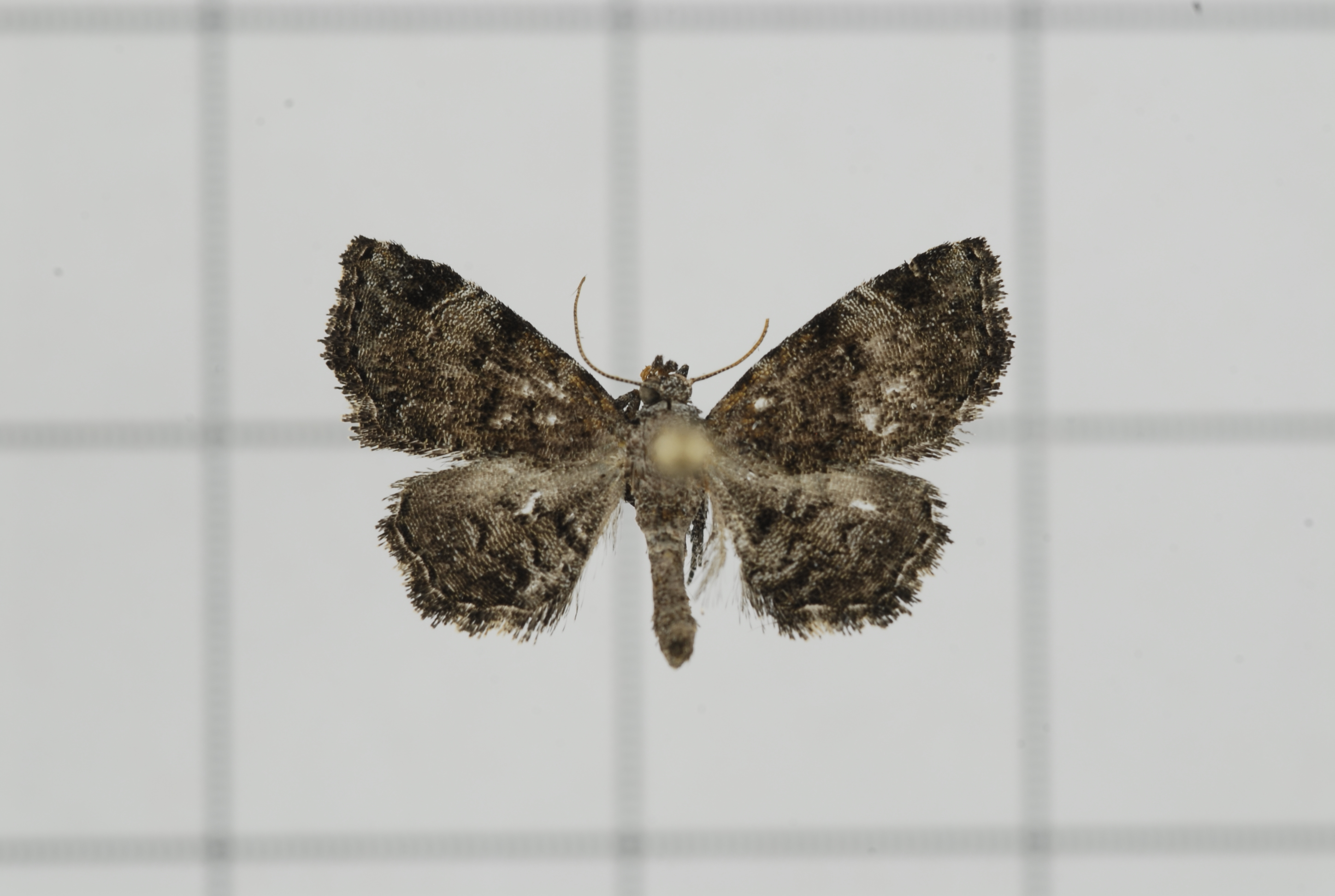
Aventiola noctuidae

Aventiola is a monotypic moth genus of the family Erebidae described by Staudinger in 1892. Its only species, Aventiola pusilla, was first described by Arthur Gardiner Butler in 1879. It is found in Japan and south-eastern Siberia.
