= Argyromatoides =

Scientific classification
- Domain: Eukaryota
- Kingdom: Animalia
- Phylum: Arthropoda
- Class: Insecta
- Order: Lepidoptera
- Superfamily: Noctuoidea
- Family: Noctuidae
- Genus: Argyromatoides

Genus of moths

Argyromatoides is a genus of moths of the family Noctuidae.
