= Salia (moth) =

Scientific classification
- Kingdom: Animalia
- Phylum: Arthropoda
- Clade: Pancrustacea
- Class: Insecta
- Order: Lepidoptera
- Superfamily: Noctuoidea
- Family: Erebidae
- Subfamily: Herminiinae
- Genus: Salia; Hübner, [1818]

Synonyms
- Megatomis Hübner, 1821; Homogramma Guenée, 1854; Aegara Walker, [1866]; Batyma Schaus, 1906

Genus of moths

Salia is a genus of moths of the family Noctuidae. The genus was erected by Jacob Hübner in 1818.

== Species ==
- Salia acidalialis (Guenée, 1854) Cayenne
- Salia acuminatalis (Walker, [1866])
- Salia albivia (Hampson, 1950) British Guiana
- Salia anna (H. Druce, 1891) Panama
- Salia anthippe (H. Druce, 1891) Mexico
- Salia anyte (H. Druce, 1891) Mexico
- Salia bidentalis (Warren, 1889) Brazil (Amazonas)
- Salia brevilinealis (Schaus, 1916) Cayenne
- Salia compta (Walker, 1865) Brazil
- Salia euphrionalis (Walker, 1859) Brazil
- Salia ferrigeralis (Walker, [1866]) Dominican Republic
- Salia hastiferalis (Walker, [1859]) Venezuela
- Salia hermia (Schaus, 1916) Cayenne
- Salia leosalis (Walker, [1859])
- Salia lyceus (H. Druce, 1891) Panama, Mexico
- Salia lysippusalis (Walker, [1859]) Brazil
- Salia lysizona (H. Druce, 1891) Mexico
- Salia macarialis (Guenée, 1854) Brazil (Amazonas), Cayenne
- Salia mago (H. Druce, 1891) Mexico
- Salia mialis (Guenée, 1854) Cayenne, Brazil (Amazonas)
- Salia mikani (Felder & Rogenhofer, 1874) Brazil (Amazonas)
- Salia mimalis Hübner, [1818] Brazil
- Salia moribundalis (Guenée, 1854) Cayenne
- Salia onesalis (Schaus, 1906) Brazil (Parana)
- Salia otisalis (Walker, [1859]) Venezuela
- Salia polycletusalis (Walker, [1859]) Brazil (Amazonas)
- Salia remulcens (Felder & Rogenhofer, 1874) Brazil (Amazonas)
- Salia semiothisa (Schaus, 1916) British Guiana
- Salia submarcata (Schaus, 1916) Cayenne
- Salia terricola (Möschler, 1880) Suriname
- Salia trinidalis (Dognin, 1914) Trinidad
