= Arabriga =

Scientific classification
- Kingdom: Animalia
- Phylum: Arthropoda
- Class: Insecta
- Order: Lepidoptera
- Superfamily: Noctuoidea
- Family: Noctuidae (?)
- Subfamily: Catocalinae
- Genus: Arabriga; Walker, 1869
- Species: A. bimaculata

Binomial name
- Arabriga bimaculata Walker, 1869

Genus of moths

Arabriga is a monotypic moth genus of the family Noctuidae. Its only species, Arabriga bimaculata, is known from Honduras. Both the genus and species were first described by Francis Walker in 1869.
