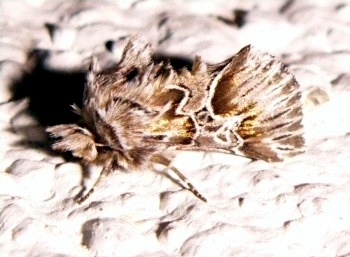

Scientific classification
- Kingdom: Animalia
- Phylum: Arthropoda
- Class: Insecta
- Order: Lepidoptera
- Superfamily: Noctuoidea
- Family: Noctuidae
- Subfamily: Cuculliinae
- Genus: Amephana; Hampson, 1906

= Amephana =

Genus of moths

Amephana is a genus of moths of the family Noctuidae.

== Species ==
- Subgenus Amephana
  - Amephana anarrhini (Duponchel, 1840)
- Subgenus Trigonephra Berio, 1980
  - Amephana aurita (Fabricius, 1787)
  - Amephana dalmatica (Rebel, 1919)
