= Athyrmella =

Scientific classification
- Domain: Eukaryota
- Kingdom: Animalia
- Phylum: Arthropoda
- Class: Insecta
- Order: Lepidoptera
- Superfamily: Noctuoidea
- Family: Noctuidae (?)
- Subfamily: Catocalinae
- Genus: Athyrmella; Roepke, 1941
- Species: A. priangani

Binomial name
- Athyrmella priangani Roepke, 1941

Genus of moths

Athyrmella is a monotypic moth genus of the family Noctuidae. Its only species, Athyrmella priangani, is known from Java in Indonesia. Both the genus and the species were first described by Roepke in 1941.
