= Ananepa =

Scientific classification
- Kingdom: Animalia
- Phylum: Arthropoda
- Class: Insecta
- Order: Lepidoptera
- Superfamily: Noctuoidea
- Family: Noctuidae (?)
- Subfamily: Catocalinae
- Genus: Ananepa; Hampson, 1926
- Species: A. doda

Binomial name
- Ananepa doda (Swinhoe, 1902)

Genus of moths

Ananepa is a monotypic moth genus of the family Noctuidae erected by George Hampson in 1926. Its only species, Ananepa doda, was first described by Swinhoe in 1902. It is found in Taiwan.
