= Authadistis =

Scientific classification
- Kingdom: Animalia
- Phylum: Arthropoda
- Class: Insecta
- Order: Lepidoptera
- Superfamily: Noctuoidea
- Family: Noctuidae (?)
- Subfamily: Catocalinae
- Genus: Authadistis; Hampson, 1902

Genus of moths

Authadistis is a genus of moths of the family Noctuidae.

== Species ==
- Authadistis camptogramma Hampson, 1916
- Authadistis metaleuca Hampson, 1902
- Authadistis nyctichroa Hampson, 1926
