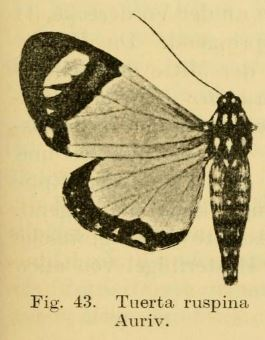
- Aletopus ruspina

Scientific classification
- Domain: Eukaryota
- Kingdom: Animalia
- Phylum: Arthropoda
- Class: Insecta
- Order: Lepidoptera
- Superfamily: Noctuoidea
- Family: Noctuidae
- Subfamily: Agaristinae
- Genus: Aletopus; Jordan, 1926

= Aletopus =

Genus of moths

Aletopus is a genus of moths of the family Noctuidae.

== Species ==
- Aletopus imperialis Jordan, 1926 (from Tanzania)
- Aletopus ruspina (Aurivillius, 1909) (from Congo-Brazzaville)
