= Arytrura =

Scientific classification
- Kingdom: Animalia
- Phylum: Arthropoda
- Class: Insecta
- Order: Lepidoptera
- Superfamily: Noctuoidea
- Family: Erebidae
- Tribe: Catocalini
- Genus: Arytrura; John, 1912

Synonyms
- Megazethes Warren, 1913

Genus of moths

Arytrura is a genus of moths of the family Noctuidae and only genus in the subtribe Arytrurina. The genus was erected by Oscar John in 1912.

The genus Arytrura includes two recognised species, Arytrura musculus and Arytrura subfalcata, which are accepted by taxonomic databases. These species are catalogued in global biodiversity resources that record distributions and nomenclature within the Noctuidae family.

== Species ==
- Arytrura musculus (Ménétriés, 1859)
- Arytrura subfalcata (Ménétriés, 1859)
