= Antapistis =

Scientific classification
- Domain: Eukaryota
- Kingdom: Animalia
- Phylum: Arthropoda
- Class: Insecta
- Order: Lepidoptera
- Superfamily: Noctuoidea
- Family: Noctuidae (?)
- Subfamily: Catocalinae
- Genus: Antapistis; Hubner, 1825

Synonyms
- Nazuda Walker, 1865

Genus of moths

Antapistis is a genus of moths of the family Noctuidae.

== Species ==
- Antapistis holophaea (Hampson, 1926)
- Antapistis leucospila (Walker, 1865)
- Antapistis phoenicistes (Hampson, 1926)
