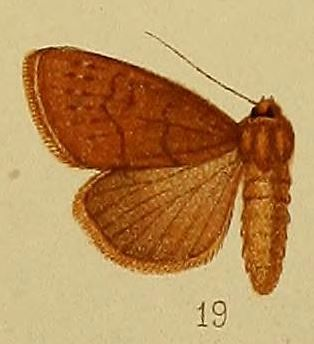
- Aspidifrontia corticea

Scientific classification
- Kingdom: Animalia
- Phylum: Arthropoda
- Class: Insecta
- Order: Lepidoptera
- Superfamily: Noctuoidea
- Family: Noctuidae
- Tribe: Hadenini
- Genus: Aspidifrontia; Hampson, 1902

Synonyms
- Aspidhampsonia Berio, 1964

= Aspidifrontia =

Genus of moths

Aspidifrontia is a genus of moths of the family Noctuidae.
