= Acygnatha =

Scientific classification
- Kingdom: Animalia
- Phylum: Arthropoda
- Class: Insecta
- Order: Lepidoptera
- Superfamily: Noctuoidea
- Family: Erebidae
- Subfamily: Calpinae
- Genus: Acygnatha; Hampson, 1926

Genus of moths

Acygnatha is a genus of moths of the family Noctuidae.

== Species ==
- Acygnatha atrapex (Hampson, 1895)
- Acygnatha fasciata (Hampson, 1898)
- Acygnatha mesozona Hampson, 1926
- Acygnatha nigripuncta (Hampson, 1907)
- Acygnatha stigmatilis (Hampson, 1898)
- Acygnatha terminalis (Wileman, 1915)
