= Ampelasia =

Scientific classification
- Domain: Eukaryota
- Kingdom: Animalia
- Phylum: Arthropoda
- Class: Insecta
- Order: Lepidoptera
- Superfamily: Noctuoidea
- Family: Noctuidae (?)
- Subfamily: Catocalinae
- Genus: Ampelasia; Schaus, 1913

Genus of moths

Ampelasia is a genus of moths of the family Noctuidae. The genus was described by William Schaus in 1913.

== Species ==
- Ampelasia azelinoides Schaus, 1913
- Ampelasia schausialis Dognin, 1914
