= Adiopa =

Scientific classification
- Domain: Eukaryota
- Kingdom: Animalia
- Phylum: Arthropoda
- Class: Insecta
- Order: Lepidoptera
- Superfamily: Noctuoidea
- Family: Erebidae
- Subfamily: Calpinae
- Genus: Adiopa; Schaus, 1940

Type species
- Hadena disgrega Möschler, 1890

Genus of moths

Adiopa is a genus of moths of the family Noctuidae.

== Species ==
- Adiopa disgrega (Moschler, 1890)
- Adiopa marama (Schaus, 1904)
