= Adyroma =

Scientific classification
- Domain: Eukaryota
- Kingdom: Animalia
- Phylum: Arthropoda
- Class: Insecta
- Order: Lepidoptera
- Superfamily: Noctuoidea
- Family: Erebidae
- Subfamily: Calpinae
- Genus: Adyroma; Moschler, 1880

Genus of moths

Adyroma is a genus of moths of the family Noctuidae.

== Species ==
- Adyroma reposita Moschler, 1880
