= Acontarache =

Scientific classification
- Domain: Eukaryota
- Kingdom: Animalia
- Phylum: Arthropoda
- Class: Insecta
- Order: Lepidoptera
- Superfamily: Noctuoidea
- Family: Noctuidae
- Subfamily: Acontiinae
- Genus: Acontarache; Berio, 1977
- Species: A. somaliensis

Binomial name
- Acontarache somaliensis Berio, 1977

Genus of moths

Acontarache is a monotypic moth genus of the family Noctuidae. Its only species, Acontarache somaliensis, is found in Somalia. Both the genus and species were first described by Emilio Berio in 1977.

Lepidoptera and Some Other Life Forms gives this name as a subgenus of Acontia Ochsenheimer, 1816 and the above species as a synonym of Acontia somaliensis (Berio, 1977).
