= Forsebia =

Scientific classification
- Domain: Eukaryota
- Kingdom: Animalia
- Phylum: Arthropoda
- Class: Insecta
- Order: Lepidoptera
- Superfamily: Noctuoidea
- Family: Erebidae
- Tribe: Melipotini
- Genus: Forsebia; Richards, 1935

Synonyms
- Asyneda Richards, 1936

Genus of moths

Forsebia is a genus of moths in the family Erebidae. The genus was described by Richards in 1936.

== Species ==
- Forsebia cinis (Guenée, 1852) (syn: Forsebia perlaeta H. Edwards, 1882)
- Forsebia mendozina (Hampson, 1926)
