= Argillophora =

Scientific classification
- Domain: Eukaryota
- Kingdom: Animalia
- Phylum: Arthropoda
- Class: Insecta
- Order: Lepidoptera
- Superfamily: Noctuoidea
- Family: Noctuidae
- Subfamily: Acontiinae
- Genus: Argillophora; Grote, 1873

Genus of moths

Argillophora is a genus of moths of the family Noctuidae.

== Species ==
- Argillophora argillophora Dyar, 1914
- Argillophora furcilla Grote, 1873
