= Ariphrades =

Scientific classification
- Domain: Eukaryota
- Kingdom: Animalia
- Phylum: Arthropoda
- Class: Insecta
- Order: Lepidoptera
- Superfamily: Noctuoidea
- Family: Erebidae
- Subfamily: Hypeninae
- Genus: Ariphrades; H. Druce in Godman & Salvin, 1891

Genus of moths

Ariphrades is a genus of moths of the family Erebidae. The genus was erected by Herbert Druce in 1891.

== Species ==
- Ariphrades plumigera Dognin, 1914 Paraguay
- Ariphrades setula H. Druce, 1891 Panama
