= Acrarmostis =

Scientific classification
- Kingdom: Animalia
- Phylum: Arthropoda
- Class: Insecta
- Order: Lepidoptera
- Superfamily: Noctuoidea
- Family: Erebidae
- Subfamily: Hypeninae
- Genus: Acrarmostis; Meyrick, 1889
- Species: A. dryopa

Binomial name
- Acrarmostis dryopa Meyrick, 1889

Genus of moths

Acrarmostis is a monotypic moth genus of the family Erebidae. Its only species, Acrarmostis dryopa, is known from New Guinea. Both the genus and the species were first described by Edward Meyrick in 1889.
