= Ateneria =

Scientific classification
- Domain: Eukaryota
- Kingdom: Animalia
- Phylum: Arthropoda
- Class: Insecta
- Order: Lepidoptera
- Superfamily: Noctuoidea
- Family: Noctuidae (?)
- Subfamily: Catocalinae
- Genus: Ateneria; Schaus, 1914
- Species: A. crinipuncta

Binomial name
- Ateneria crinipuncta Schaus, 1914

Genus of insects

Ateneria is a monotypic moth genus of the family Noctuidae. Its only species, Ateneria crinipuncta, is found in French Guiana. Both the genus and the species were first described by William Schaus in 1914.
