= Amphoraceras =

Scientific classification
- Kingdom: Animalia
- Phylum: Arthropoda
- Class: Insecta
- Order: Lepidoptera
- Superfamily: Noctuoidea
- Family: Erebidae
- Subfamily: Erebinae
- Genus: Amphoraceras; Bethune-Baker, 1904

Genus of moths

Amphoraceras is a moth genus of the family Erebidae. The two species of the genus are both endemic to New Guinea.

== Taxonomy ==
Both the genus and the type species Amphoraceras rothschildi were first described by George Thomas Bethune-Baker in 1904. This was a monotypic genus until description of Amphoraceras jordani in 2018.

== Species ==
There are two recognized species:

- Amphoraceras rothschildi Bethune-Baker, 1904 – New Guinea
- Amphoraceras jordani Zilli, 2018 – New Guinea
