= Argillana =

Scientific classification
- Domain: Eukaryota
- Kingdom: Animalia
- Phylum: Arthropoda
- Class: Insecta
- Order: Lepidoptera
- Superfamily: Noctuoidea
- Family: Erebidae
- Subfamily: Hypeninae
- Genus: Argillana; Bethune-Baker, 1908
- Species: A. albistrigata

Binomial name
- Argillana albistrigata Bethune-Baker, 1908

Genus of moths

Argillana is a monotypic moth genus of the family Erebidae. Its only species, Argillana albistrigata, is found on New Guinea. Both the genus and the species were first described by George Thomas Bethune-Baker in 1908.
