= Abolla pellicosta =

Scientific classification
- Domain: Eukaryota
- Kingdom: Animalia
- Phylum: Arthropoda
- Class: Insecta
- Order: Lepidoptera
- Superfamily: Noctuoidea
- Family: Erebidae
- Genus: Abolla; Rogenhöfer, 1874
- Species: A. pellicosta

Binomial name
- Abolla pellicosta Felder, 1874

Species of moth

Abolla is a genus of moths of the family Noctuidae with a single species, Abolla pellicosta.

Poole (1989) included Abolla in the subfamily Ophiderinae, treated as Calpinae by Kitching & Rawlins, in Kristensen (1999).
