= Anatatha =

Scientific classification
- Kingdom: Animalia
- Phylum: Arthropoda
- Class: Insecta
- Order: Lepidoptera
- Superfamily: Noctuoidea
- Family: Noctuidae (?)
- Subfamily: Catocalinae
- Genus: Anatatha; Hampson, 1926

Genus of moths

Anatatha is a genus of moths of the family Noctuidae.

== Species ==
- Anatatha lignea (Butler, 1879)
- Anatatha lophonota (Hampson, 1898)
- Anatatha maculifera (Butler, 1889)
- Anatatha misae Sugi, 1982
- Anatatha nigrisigna (Hampson, 1895)
- Anatatha wilemani (Sugi, 1958)
