= Argyropasta =

Scientific classification
- Kingdom: Animalia
- Phylum: Arthropoda
- Class: Insecta
- Order: Lepidoptera
- Superfamily: Noctuoidea
- Family: Noctuidae
- Subfamily: Acontiinae
- Genus: Argyropasta; Hampson, 1910
- Species: A. thermopera

Binomial name
- Argyropasta thermopera Hampson, 1910

Genus of moths

Argyropasta is a monotypic moth genus of the family Noctuidae. Its only species, Argyropasta thermopera, is found in the Brazilian state of Santa Catarina. Both the genus and species were first described by George Hampson in 1910.
