= Amphodia =

Scientific classification
- Domain: Eukaryota
- Kingdom: Animalia
- Phylum: Arthropoda
- Class: Insecta
- Order: Lepidoptera
- Superfamily: Noctuoidea
- Family: Noctuidae
- Subfamily: Acontiinae
- Genus: Amphodia; Möschler, 1880
- Species: A. prolata

Binomial name
- Amphodia prolata Möschler, 1880

Genus of moths

Amphodia is a monotypic moth genus of the family Noctuidae. Its only species, Amphodia prolata, is found in Suriname. Both the genus and species were first described by Heinrich Benno Möschler in 1880.
