= Alogonia (town) =

Ancient town in Messenia, Greece

Alagonia was an ancient town of Messenia, south-east of Gerenia: north-east of which there was a temple of Bacchus and another of Minerva.
