= Azumaia =

Scientific classification
- Kingdom: Animalia
- Phylum: Arthropoda
- Clade: Pancrustacea
- Class: Insecta
- Order: Lepidoptera
- Superfamily: Noctuoidea
- Family: Noctuidae
- Subfamily: Acontiinae
- Genus: Azumaia; Sugi in Inoue, Sugi, Kuroko, Moriuti & Kawabe, 1982
- Species: A. micardiopsis

Binomial name
- Azumaia micardiopsis Sugi, 1982

Genus of moths

Azumaia is a monotypic moth genus of the family Noctuidae. Its only species, Azumaia micardiopsis, is found in Japan. Both the genus and species were first described by Shigero Sugi in 1982.
