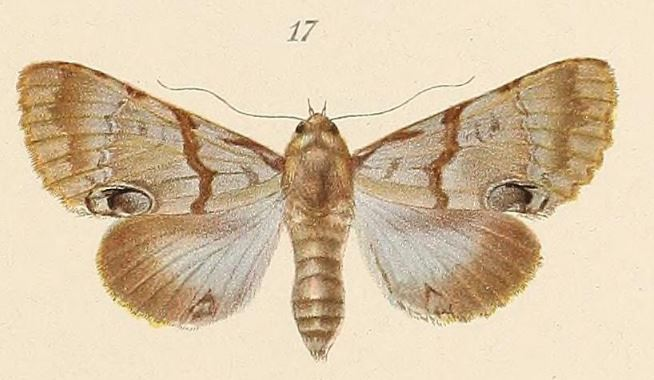

Scientific classification
- Domain: Eukaryota
- Kingdom: Animalia
- Phylum: Arthropoda
- Class: Insecta
- Order: Lepidoptera
- Superfamily: Noctuoidea
- Family: Noctuidae (?)
- Subfamily: Catocalinae
- Genus: Amblyprora; Bethune-Baker, 1911

= Amblyprora =

Genus of moths

Amblyprora is a genus of moths of the family Noctuidae.

== Species ==
- Amblyprora acholi (Bethune-Baker, 1906)
- Amblyprora alboporphyrea (Pagenstecher, 1907)
- Amblyprora magnifica (Schaus, 1893)
- Amblyprora pacifica (Bryk, 1915)
- Amblyprora subalba (Seydel, 1937)
- Amblyprora superba (Seydel, 1937)
