= Athyrmina =

Scientific classification
- Kingdom: Animalia
- Phylum: Arthropoda
- Class: Insecta
- Order: Lepidoptera
- Superfamily: Noctuoidea
- Family: Noctuidae (?)
- Subfamily: Catocalinae
- Genus: Athyrmina; Hampson, 1926

Genus of moths

Athyrmina is a genus of moths of the family Noctuidae.

== Species ==
- Athyrmina albigutta (Swinhoe, 1895)
- Athyrmina birthana (Swinhoe, 1905)
- Athyrmina melanosticta (Hampson, 1895)
