= Janthinea =

Scientific classification
- Kingdom: Animalia
- Phylum: Arthropoda
- Class: Insecta
- Order: Lepidoptera
- Superfamily: Noctuoidea
- Family: Noctuidae
- Genus: Janthinea; Guenée in Boisduval & Guenée, 1852

Genus of moths

Janthinea is a genus of moths of the family Noctuidae.

== Species ==
- Janthinea divalis Staudinger, 1891
- Janthinea friwaldszkii (Duponchel, 1835)
