= Acylita =

- Acylita sanguifusa, the type species of the genus

Scientific classification
- Kingdom: Animalia
- Phylum: Arthropoda
- Class: Insecta
- Order: Lepidoptera
- Superfamily: Noctuoidea
- Family: Noctuidae
- Genus: Acylita; Hampson, 1908

Genus of moths

Acylita is a genus of moths of the family Noctuidae erected by George Hampson in 1908.

== Species ==
- Acylita cara Schaus, 1894
- Acylita distincta E. D. Jones, 1908
- Acylita dukinfieldi Schaus, 1894
- Acylita elongata Schaus, 1906
- Acylita monosticta E. D. Jones, 1908
- Acylita sanguifusa E. D. Jones, 1908
