= Aegleoides =

Scientific classification
- Domain: Eukaryota
- Kingdom: Animalia
- Phylum: Arthropoda
- Class: Insecta
- Order: Lepidoptera
- Superfamily: Noctuoidea
- Family: Noctuidae
- Subfamily: Acontiinae
- Genus: Aegleoides; Berio, 1937
- Species: A. paolii

Binomial name
- Aegleoides paolii Berio, 1937

Genus of moths

Aegleoides is a monotypic moth genus of the family Noctuidae. Its only species, Aegleoides paolii, is found in Somalia and Ethiopia. Both the genus and species were first described by Emilio Berio in 1937.

Lepidoptera and Some Other Life Forms and Afromoths consider the name to be a synonym of Callhyccoda Berio, 1935 and the species to be a synonym of Callhyccoda paolii (Berio, 1937).
