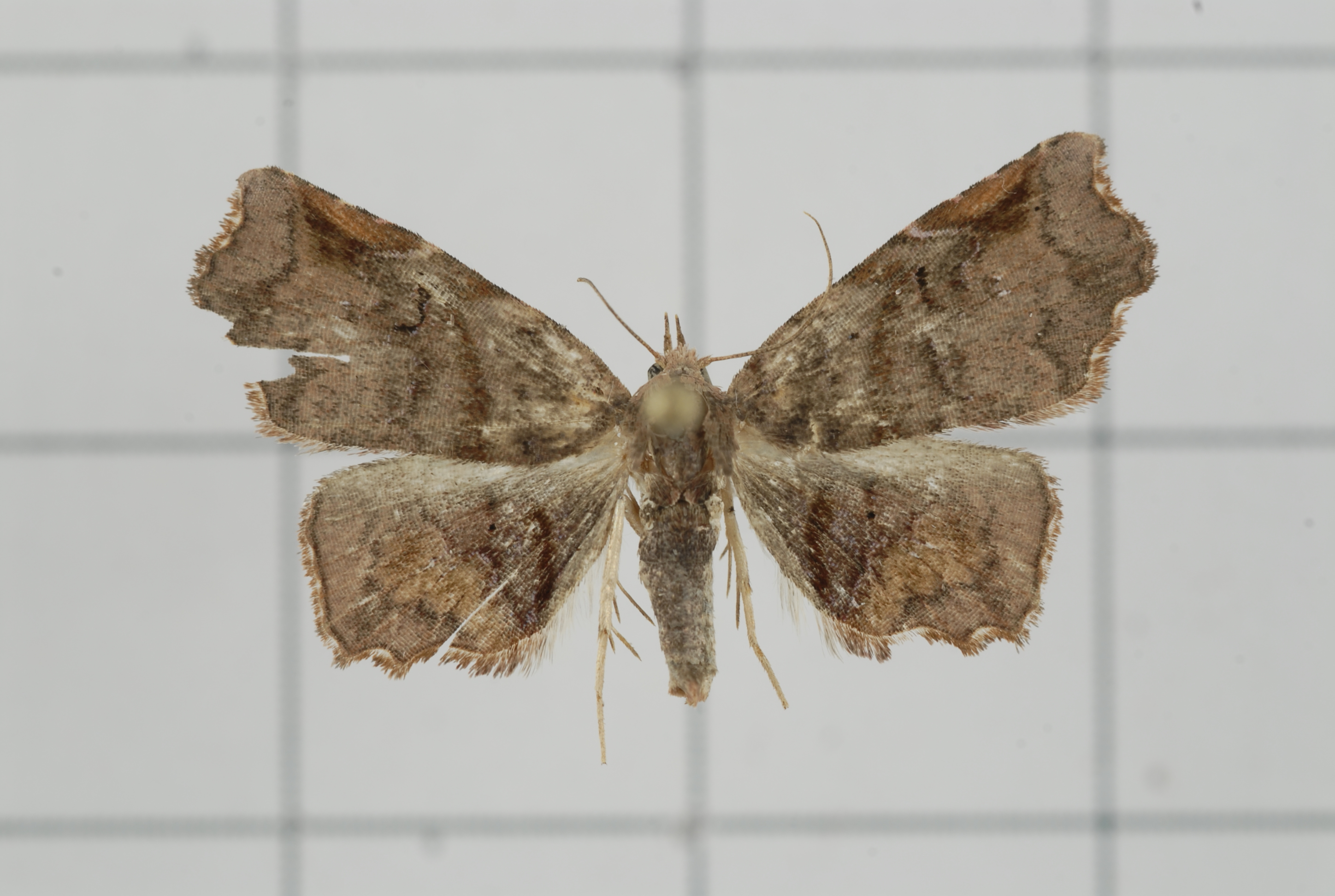
- Aroana cf. baliensis

Scientific classification
- Domain: Eukaryota
- Kingdom: Animalia
- Phylum: Arthropoda
- Class: Insecta
- Order: Lepidoptera
- Superfamily: Noctuoidea
- Family: Noctuidae
- Subfamily: Acontiinae
- Genus: Aroana; Bethune-Baker, 1906

Synonyms
- Ectogoniella Strand, 1920

= Aroana =

Genus of moths

Aroana is a genus of moths of the family Noctuidae erected by George Thomas Bethune-Baker in 1906.

== Species ==
- Aroana baliensis Hampson, 1918
- Aroana cingalensis Walker, [1866]
- Aroana hemicyclophora Turner, 1944
- Aroana ochreistriga Bethune-Baker, 1906
- Aroana olivacea Bethune-Baker, 1906
- Aroana porphyria Hampson, 1918
- Aroana rubra Bethune-Baker, 1906
