= Avittonia =

Scientific classification
- Kingdom: Animalia
- Phylum: Arthropoda
- Class: Insecta
- Order: Lepidoptera
- Superfamily: Noctuoidea
- Family: Noctuidae (?)
- Subfamily: Catocalinae
- Genus: Avittonia; Hampson, 1926
- Species: A. albidentata

Binomial name
- Avittonia albidentata Hampson, 1926

Synonyms
- Generic: Cyrtandra Roepke, 1941; Specific: Avittonia borneensis Roepke, 1941

Genus of moths

Avittonia is a monotypic moth genus of the family Noctuidae. Its only species, Avittonia albidentata, is known from Singapore. Both the genus and the species were first described by George Hampson in 1926.
