= Juncaria =

Scientific classification
- Kingdom: Animalia
- Phylum: Arthropoda
- Class: Insecta
- Order: Lepidoptera
- Superfamily: Noctuoidea
- Family: Erebidae
- Subfamily: Calpinae
- Genus: Juncaria; Walker, 1858

Synonyms
- Amblygonia Herrich-Schäffer, 1858

Genus of moths

Juncaria is a genus of moths of the family Erebidae. The genus was erected by Francis Walker in 1858.

The Global Lepidoptera Names Index also gives this name as a synonym of Hyamia Walker, 1859.

== Species ==
- Juncaria atlantica Herrich-Schäffer, 1855
- Juncaria melanothalama Hampson, 1926
