= Alogonia perissalis =

Scientific classification
- Domain: Eukaryota
- Kingdom: Animalia
- Phylum: Arthropoda
- Class: Insecta
- Order: Lepidoptera
- Superfamily: Noctuoidea
- Family: Erebidae
- Genus: Alogonia; Schaus, 1916
- Species: A. perissalis

Binomial name
- Alogonia perissalis Schaus, 1916

Species of moth

Alogonia perissalis is species of moth in the family Erebidae. It is the only species in the monotypic genus Alogonia. A. perissalis is known from Suriname, Montserrat and Trinidad. Both the genus and the species were first described by William Schaus in 1916.
