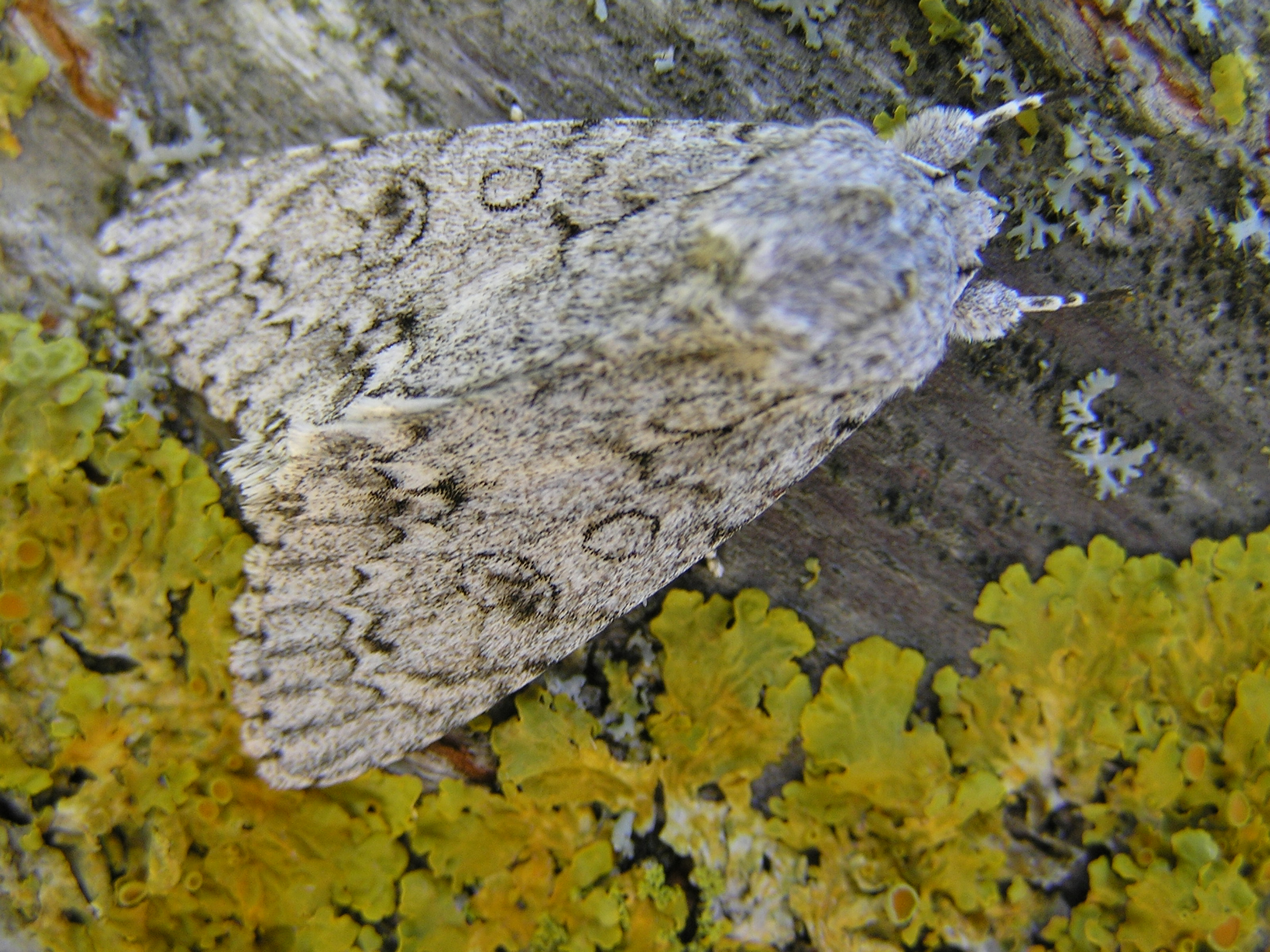
- Acronicta aceris

Scientific classification
- Kingdom: Animalia
- Phylum: Arthropoda
- Clade: Pancrustacea
- Class: Insecta
- Order: Lepidoptera
- Superfamily: Noctuoidea
- Family: Noctuidae
- Subfamily: Acronictinae

Genera
- See text

Synonyms
- Acronyctinae

= Acronictinae =

Subfamily of moths

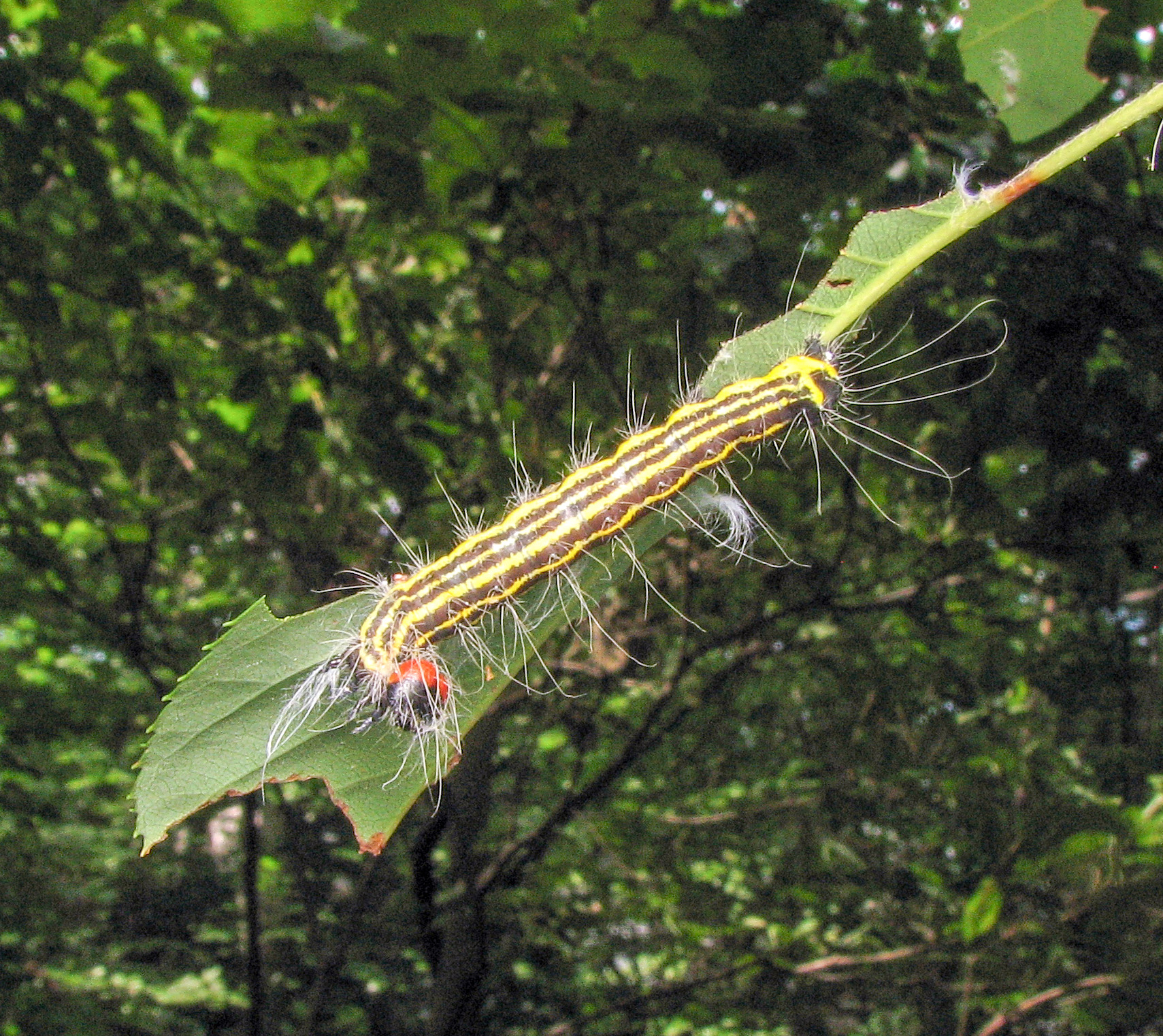
Acronicta radcliffei, larva

Acronictinae is a large subfamily of moths in the family Noctuidae.

- Acronicta
- Agriopodes
- Agrotisia
- Akoniodes
- Aleptina
- Aleptinoides
- Alika
- Amefrontia
- Amiana
- Amolita
- Amphia
- Amphidrina
- Amphilita
- Amphipoea
- Anamecia
- Anathetis
- Ancara
- Andobana
- Androlymnia
- Andropolia
- Anedhella
- Anereuthinula
- Annaphila
- Anorthodes
- Antachara
- Antha
- Anthodes
- Anthracia
- Anycteola
- Apaustis
- Apocalymnia
- Apsaranycta
- Apsarasa
- Araea
- Arboricornus
- Archanara
- Arcilasisa
- Arenostola
- Argyrhoda
- Argyrospila
- Argyrosticta
- Ariathisa
- Aseptis
- Athetis
- Atrachea
- Atrephes
- Atypha
- Aucha
- Auchecranon
- Auchmis
- Austrazenia
- Axenus
- Azenia
- Bistica
- Bryophilina
- Calymniodes
- Chalcoecia
- Chloronycta
- Chytonidia
- Conicophoria
- Craniophora
- Diphtherocome
- Eremobina
- Eulonche
- Gerbathodes
- Harrisimemna
- Hoplolythra
- Libyphaenis
- Licha
- Lophonycta
- Lucasidia
- Madeuplexia
- Merolonche
- Nacna
- Narcotica
- Ommatostolidea
- Polygrammate
- Pumora
- Simyra
- Subleuconycta
- Thalatha
- Uniramodes
- Victrix
