= Agriopodes =

Scientific classification
- Kingdom: Animalia
- Phylum: Arthropoda
- Clade: Pancrustacea
- Class: Insecta
- Order: Lepidoptera
- Superfamily: Noctuoidea
- Family: Noctuidae
- Subfamily: Acronictinae
- Genus: Agriopodes; Hampson, 1908

Genus of moths

Agriopodes is a doubtfully valid genus of noctuid moths of the family (biology) Acronictinae. The genus was erected by George Hampson in 1908.

== Species ==
Species remaining here include:

- Agriopodes jucundella Dyar, 1922
- Agriopodes teratophora (Herrich-Schäffer, 1854) = A.inscripta (Walker, 1858)

Most species formerly included in this genus have been moved to Acronicta, for example A. fallax (Herrich-Schäffer, 1854) = A.geminata (J. B. Smith, 1903).

Agriopodes tybo (Barnes, 1904) is now in the presently-monotypic Chloronycta.

Agriopodes corticosus, described as Bryophila corticosa by Guenee in 1852 is a nomen dubium.
