= Thyria =

Thyria may refer to:

- Thyria (city), an ancient Greek city
- Thyria (moth), was a genus of moths of the family Noctuidae. It is now considered a synonym of Argyrosticta
- Thyria (river), a tributary of the Sambre in Belgium
