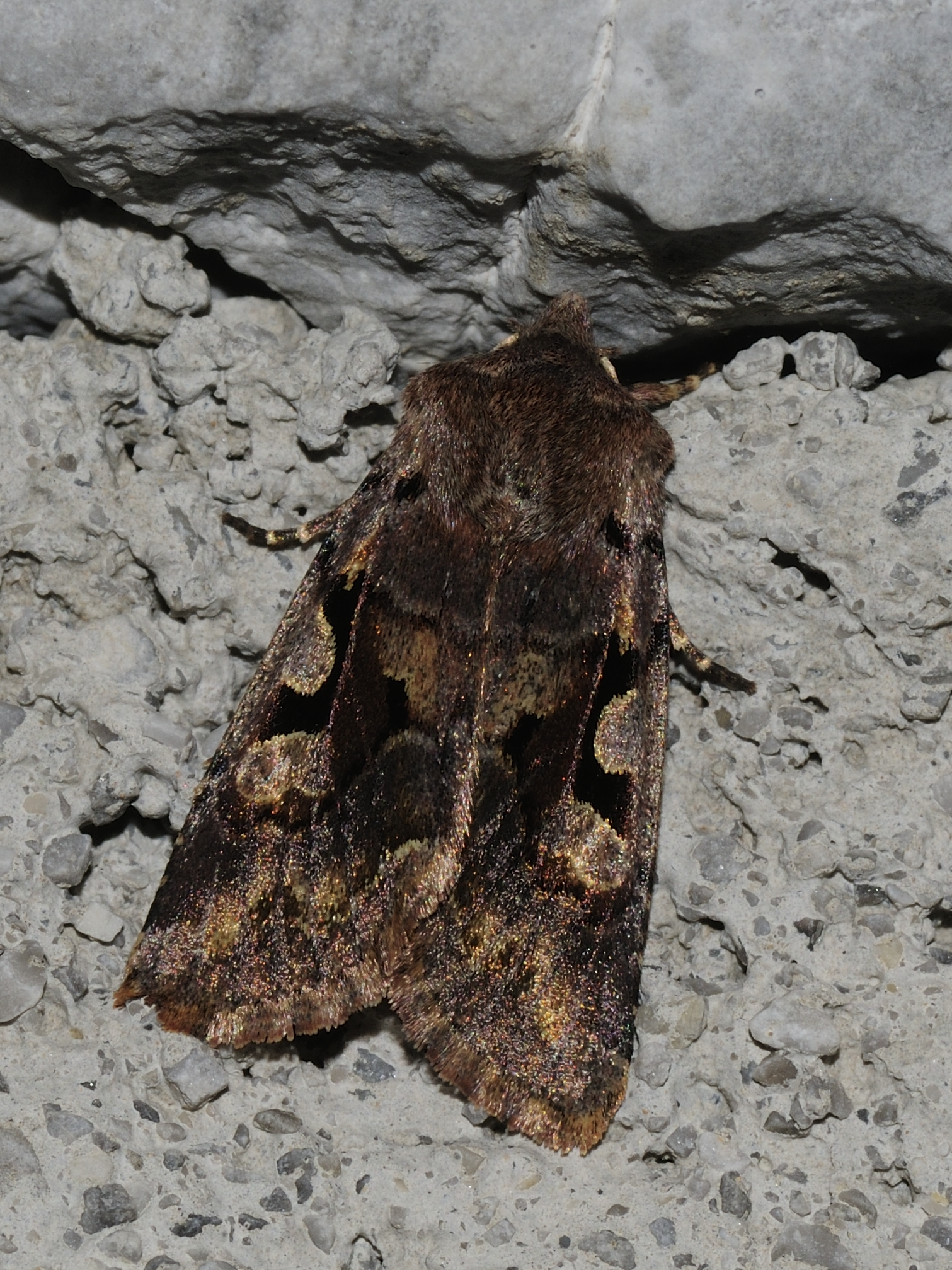

Scientific classification
- Kingdom: Animalia
- Phylum: Arthropoda
- Class: Insecta
- Order: Lepidoptera
- Superfamily: Noctuoidea
- Family: Noctuidae
- Genus: Orthosia
- Species: O. gothica

Binomial name
- Orthosia gothica (Linnaeus, 1758)

= Hebrew character =

Species of moth

The Hebrew character (Orthosia gothica) is a moth in the family Noctuidae. The species was first described by Carl Linnaeus in his 1758 10th edition of Systema Naturae. It is found throughout Europe.

Both the common and binomial names of this moth refer to distinctive black markings, one on each wing. These markings resemble the Hebrew letter nun (נ), and also a gothic arch.

== Technical description and variation ==
The wingspan is 30–40 mm. Forewing sandy rufous, black speckled, median area generally deeper rufous: lines browner, forewing purplish red brown; the lines pale, ill defined, except by black spots at costa; the cell black; stigmata pale and large; claviform connected with outer line by a black bar; above which the base of vein 2 is often surrounded with rufous; hindwing fuscous. The size of the orbicular stigma is variable, and the amount and shape of the black filling in of the cell is determined by this variation; in ab. gothicina H.-Sch. the black markings are replaced by olive brown or rufous; it is a northern form, occurring in Scotland, Scandinavia and Finland, and in the Tarbagatai Mountains; askoldensis Stgr. [now full species Orthosia askoldensis] from Amurland and Japan has a more violet-grey ground colour; ab. pallida Tutt (22b) has a pale whitish ochreous ground colour; in rufescens Tutt the reddish tint is predominant: in rufa Tutt the ground colour is red; and in brunnea Tutt the rufous tints give place to purplish brown.

== Biology ==
This moth flies at night in March and April (sometimes later) and is attracted to light and various flowers.

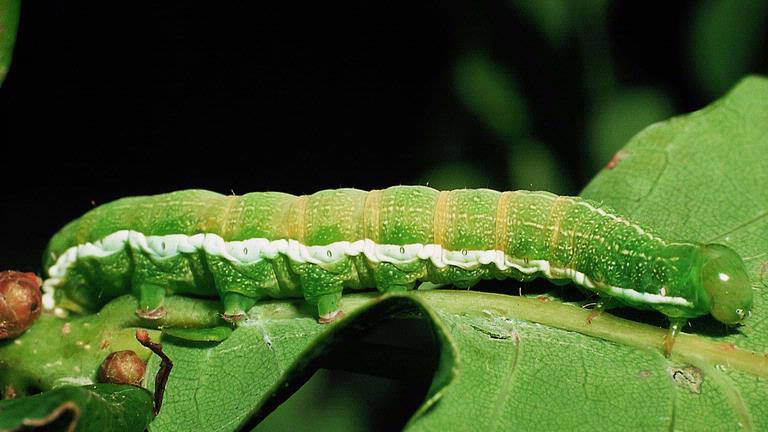
Caterpillar

The larva is green dotted all over with yellow; dorsal and subdorsal lines yellowish white; spiracular line broad, white, with dark upper edge; head pale green. It feeds on a wide variety of plants (see list below). This species overwinters as a pupa.

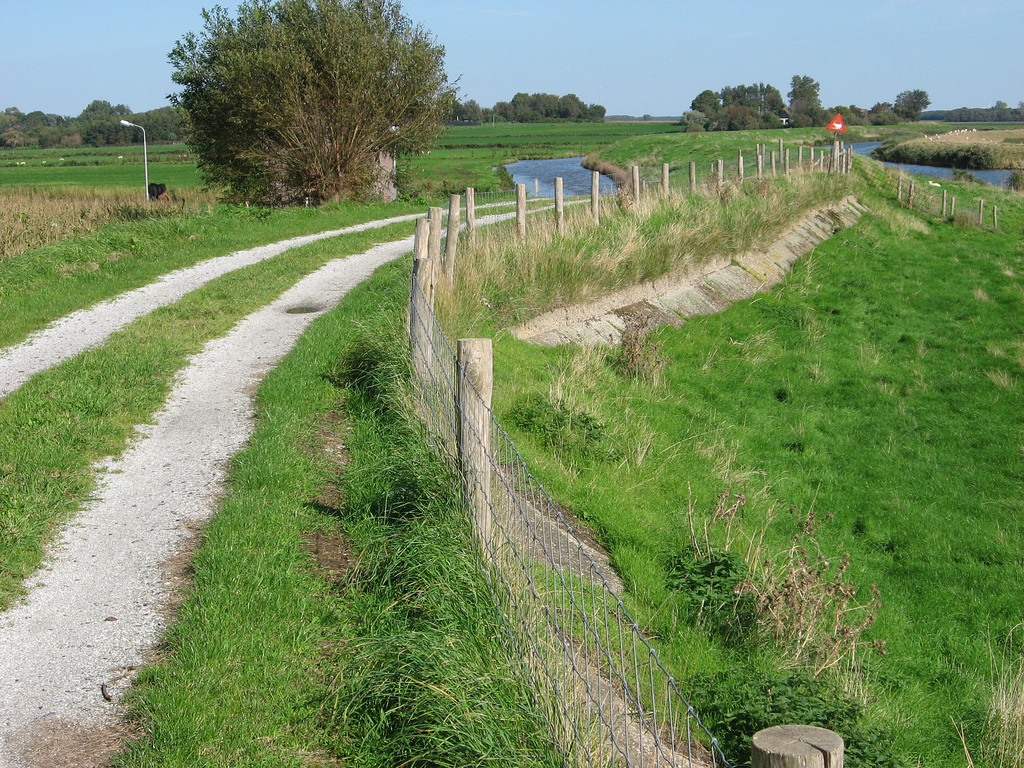
Habitat in Holland

== Recorded food plants ==
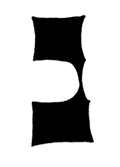
Hebrew letter nun – 15th-century Ashkenazi book-hand

- Alnus – grey alder
- Betula – birch
- Cannabis – hemp
- Centaurea
- Corylus – common hazel
- Epilobium – rosebay willowherb
- Filipendula ulmaria – meadowsweet
- Hieracium – hawkweed
- Humulus – hop
- Lythrum – purple loosestrife
- Malus – apple
- Polygonatum – Solomon's seal
- Polygonum
- Populus – aspen
- Prunus
- Quercus – oak
- Ranunculus buttercup
- Rhamnus – buckthorn
- Ribes – currant
- Rubus – raspberry
- Rumex
- Salix – willow
- Saxifraga – saxifrage
- Sorbus – rowan
- Tilia - large-leaved lime
- Vaccinium – bilberry

See Robinson, G. S et al.

== See also ==
- Setaceous Hebrew character
- Hebrew moth

== Notes ==
1. The flight season refers to the British Isles. This may vary in other parts of the range.
