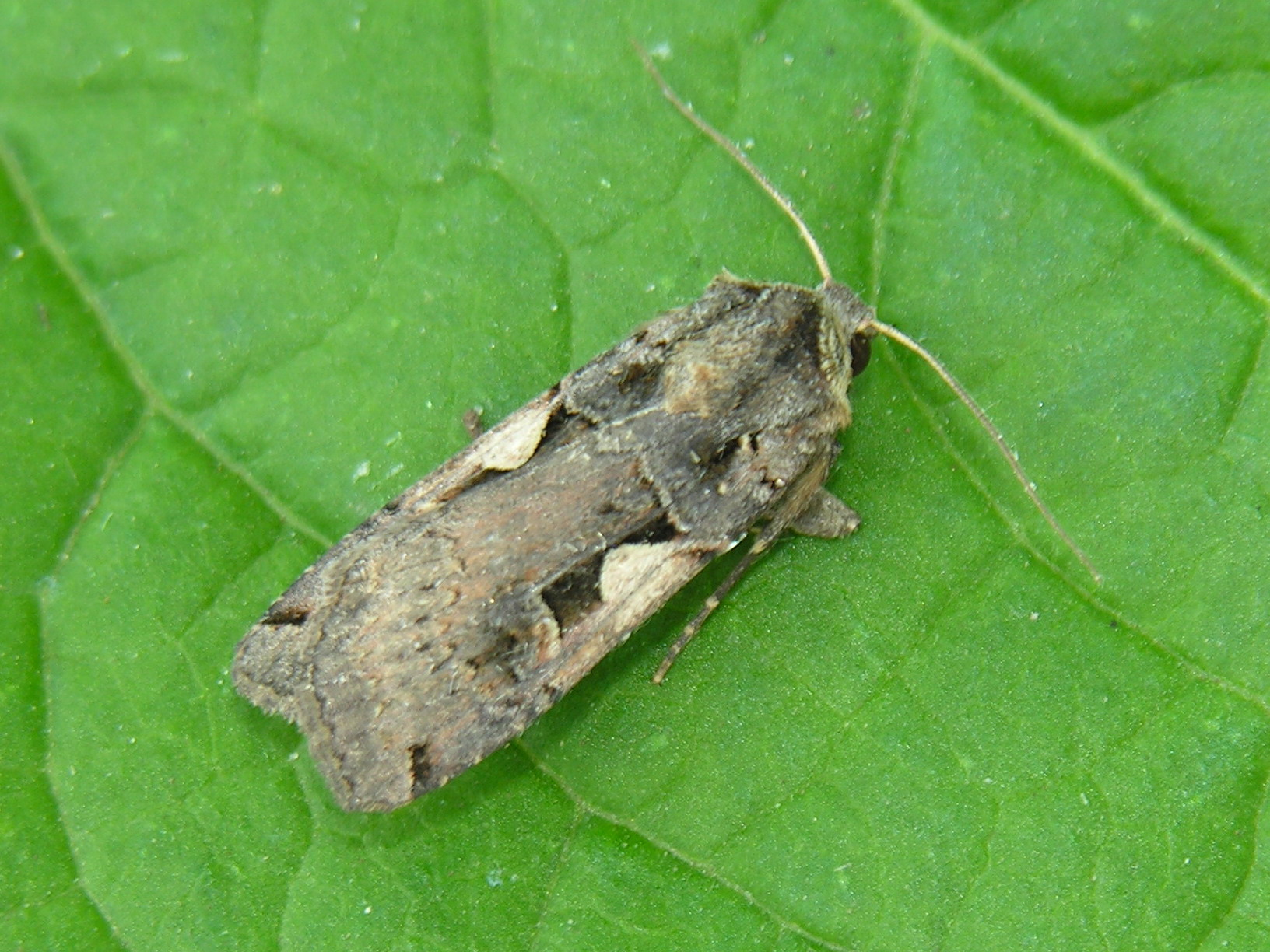

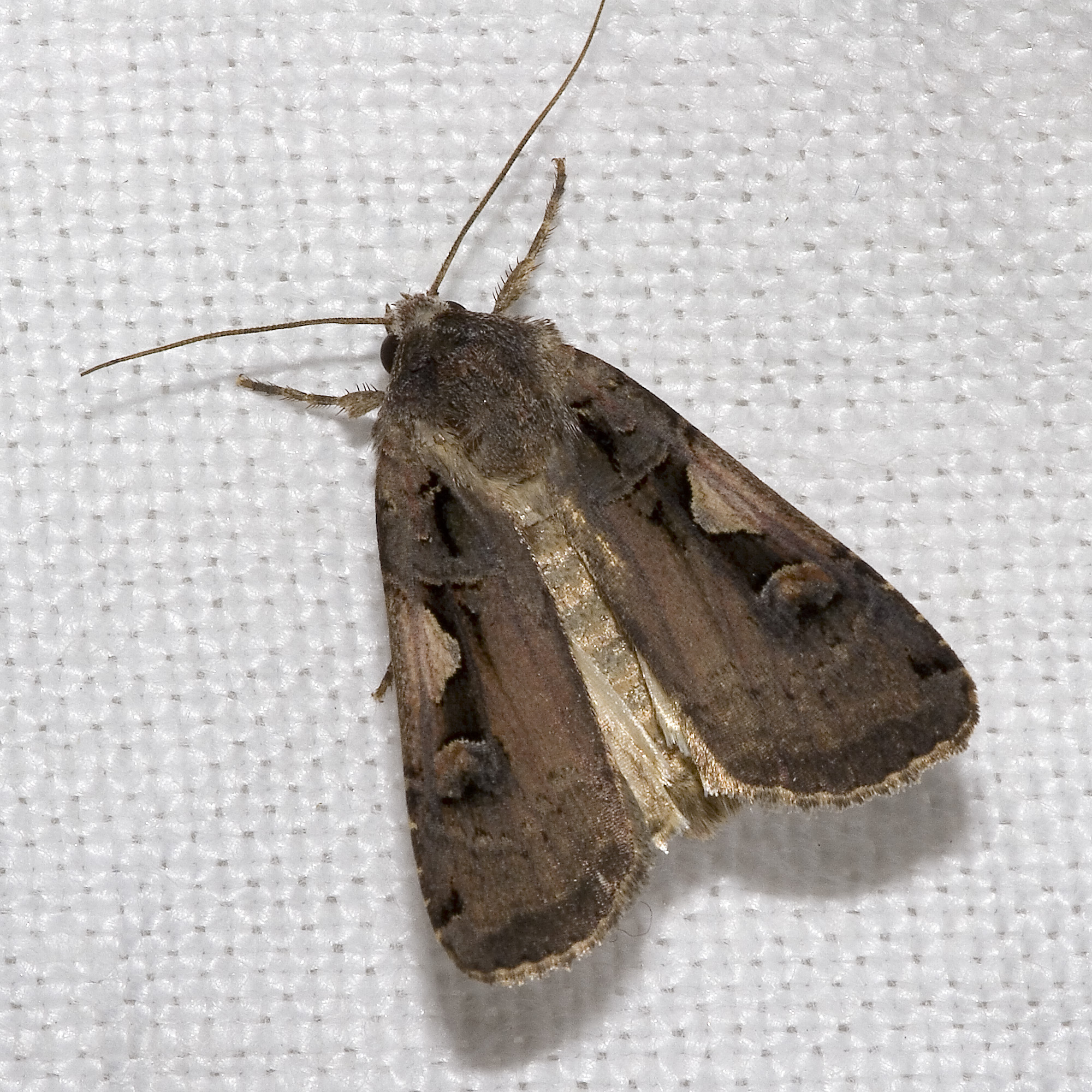

Scientific classification
- Kingdom: Animalia
- Phylum: Arthropoda
- Clade: Pancrustacea
- Class: Insecta
- Order: Lepidoptera
- Superfamily: Noctuoidea
- Family: Noctuidae
- Genus: Xestia
- Species: X. c-nigrum

Binomial name
- Xestia c-nigrum (Linnaeus, 1758)

Synonyms
- Megasema c-nigrum (Linnaeus, 1758); Phalaena c-nigrum Linnaeus, 1758; Bombyx gothica var. nunatrum Esper, 1786; Bombyx gothica var. singularis Esper, 1786; Agrotis degenerata Staudinger, 1889; Agrotis suffusa Tutt, 1892; Agrotis rosea Tutt, 1892; Agrotis umbrata Schultz, 1908; Agrotis fritschi Culot, 1910; Agrotis c-nigrum var. depravata Bang-Haas, 1912; Agrotis nigrescens Buresch, 1914; Agrotis maerens Dannehl, 1925; Agrotis c-nigrum var. kurilana Bryk, 1942; Amathes c-nigrum ignorata Eitschberger, 1972; Xestia adela Franclemont, 1980

= Setaceous Hebrew character =

Species of moth

The setaceous Hebrew character (Xestia c-nigrum) is a moth of the family Noctuidae. The species was first described by Carl Linnaeus in his 1758 10th edition of Systema Naturae. It is found in the Palearctic realm. It is a common species throughout Europe and North Asia and Central Asia, South Asia, China, Japan and Korea. It is also found in North America, from coast to coast across Canada and the northern United States to western Alaska. It occurs in the Rocky Mountains from Montana to southern Arizona and New Mexico. In the east, it ranges from Maine to North Carolina. It has recently been recorded in Tennessee.

The forewings of this species are reddish brown with distinctive patterning towards the base: a black mark resembling the Hebrew letter nun (נ), thus inspiring the common name, with a pale cream-coloured area adjacent to this mark. The hindwings are cream coloured. "Setaceous", meaning "having bristles", refers to the hairs on the top of the thorax and fringing the wings.

== Description ==
The wingspan is 35–45 mm. Forewing purplish grey or purplish fuscous with a leaden gloss; costal area at middle ochreous, merged with the bluntly triangular orbicular stigma: cell, a submedian basal blotch, and costal spot before apex purplish black; claviform stigma minute; reniform large, the lower lobe purplish; hindwing ochreous whitish, in female with the termen broadly fuscous.

Larva pink with a broad dark brown subdorsal band. A lateral yellow band with a brown spot on it. Head reddish brown in color.

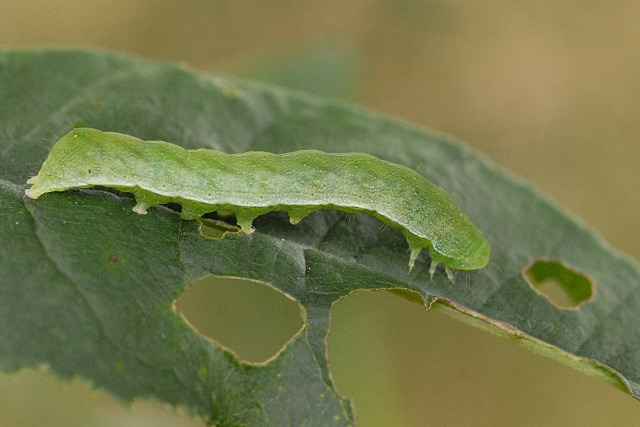
The caterpillar of the species.

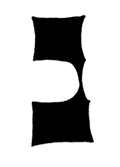
Hebrew letter nun - 15th-century Ashkenazi book-hand.

== Biology ==
Two broods are produced each year and the adults are on the wing between May and October. This moth flies at night and is attracted to light and sugar, as well as flowers such as Buddleia, ivy and ragwort.

The larva is pale brown red-brown or green with obscure paler dorsal and subdorsal lines and a broad pale ochreous spiracular line. It feeds on a huge variety of plants (see list below). The species overwinters as a larva.

1. The flight season refers to the British Isles. This may vary in other parts of the range.

=== Recorded food plants ===
Documented food plants include:

- Acer – maple
- Allium – onion
- Apium – celery
- Avena – oat
- Beta – beet
- Brassica
- Calendula – marigold
- Chrysanthemum
- Cichorium – chicory
- Cirsium – creeping thistle
- Comptonia – sweetfern
- Daucus – carrot
- Epilobium – rosebay willowherb
- Helianthus
- Hordeum – barley
- Hypericum – St John's wort
- Lactuca – lettuce
- Lamium – dead-nettle
- Lantana
- Linum
- Lobelia
- Lycopersicon – tomato
- Malus – apple
- Medicago – alfalfa (lucerne)
- Myosotis – forget-me-not
- Nicotiana – tobacco
- Photinia
- Pisum – pea
- Plantago – plantain
- Platanus – Oriental plane
- Primula
- Pyrus – pear
- Rheum – rhubarb
- Ribes – currant
- Rumex
- Senecio – groundsel
- Solanum – potato
- Solidago – goldenrods
- Spiraea
- Stellaria – chickweed
- Taraxacum – dandelion
- Thalictrum – meadow-rue
- Trifolium – clover
- Triticum – wheat
- Urtica – nettle
- Vaccinium
- Veratrum
- Viburnum
- Viola
- Vitis – grape
- Zea – maize (corn)

== Gallery ==
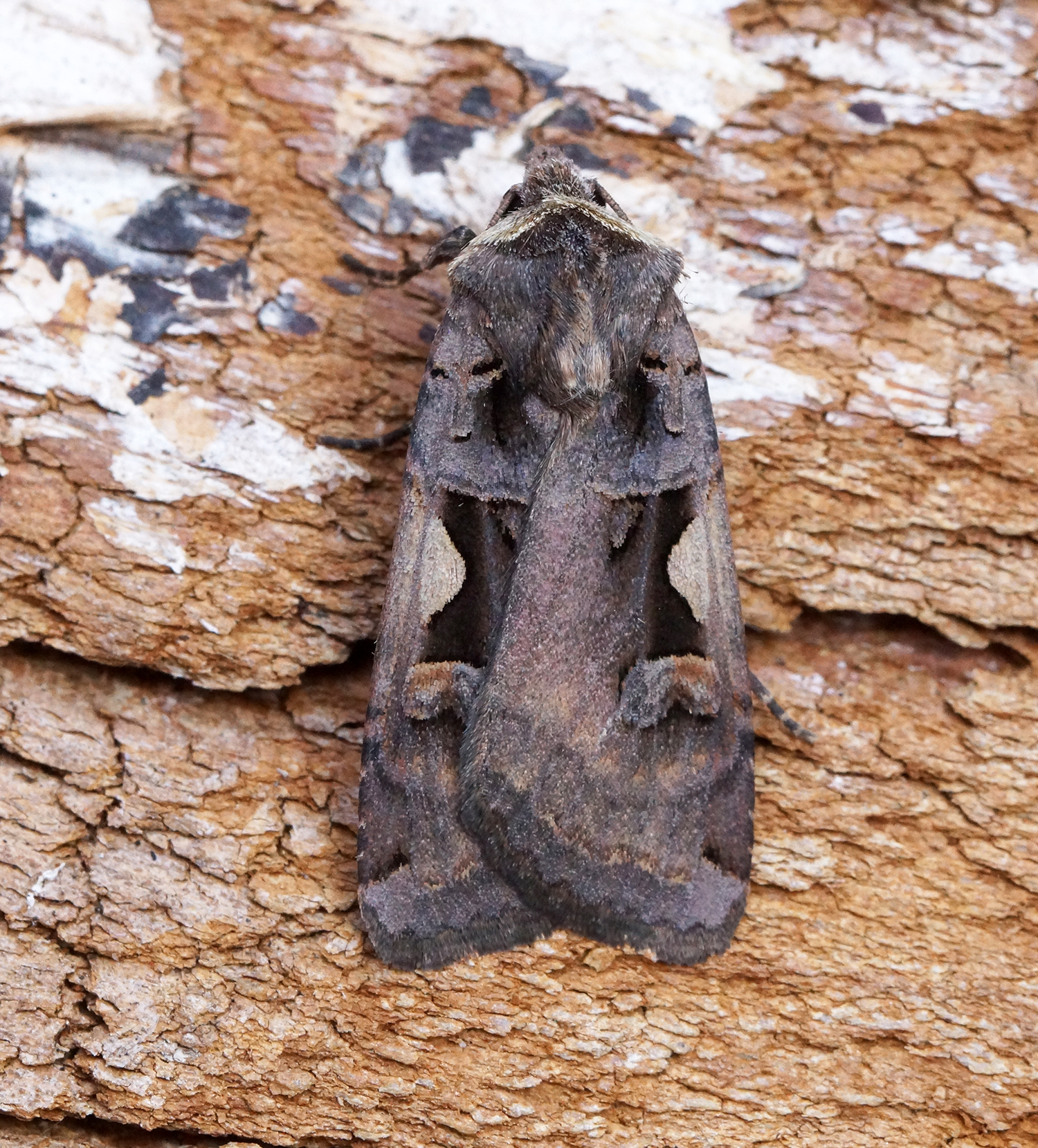

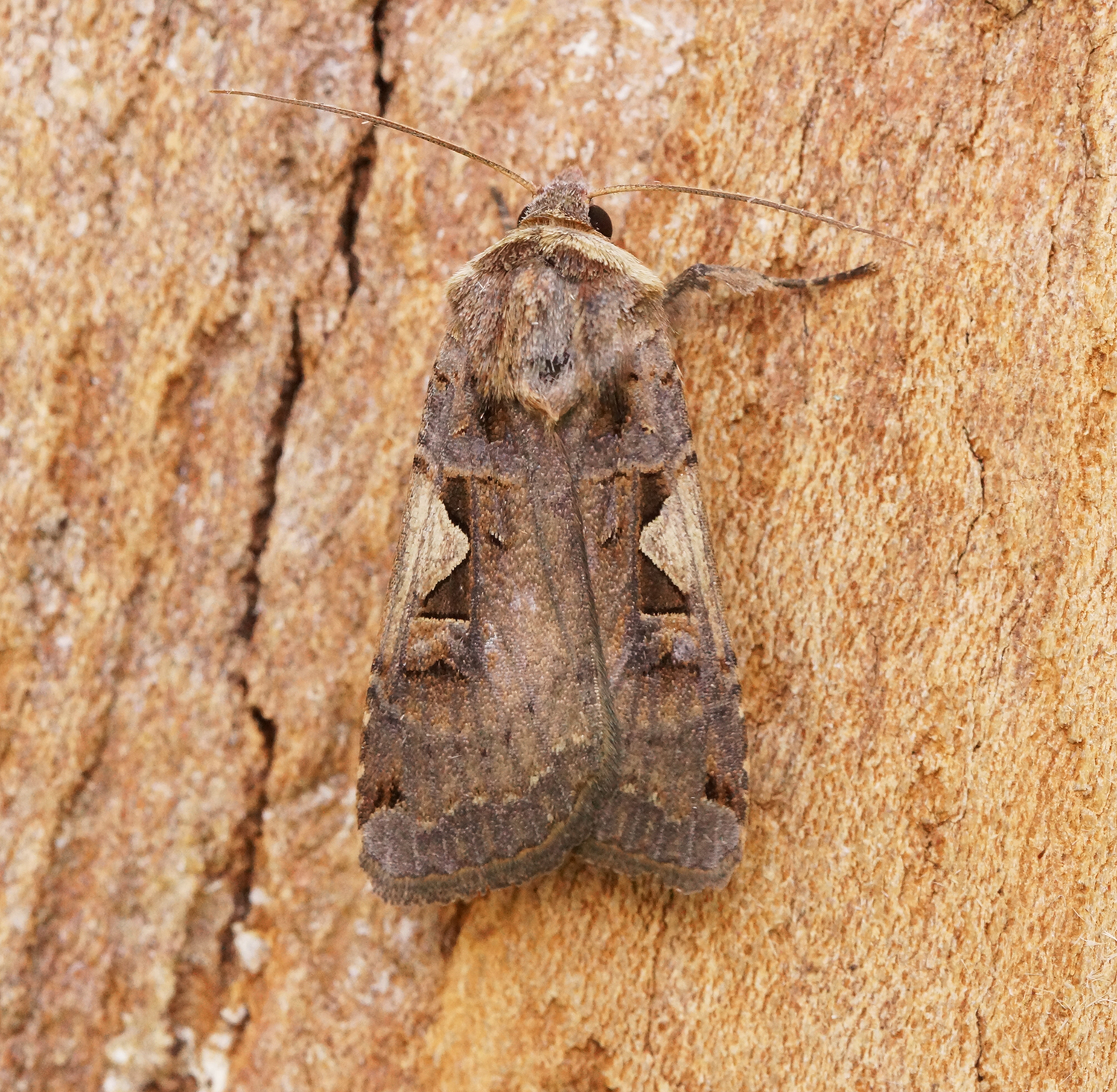

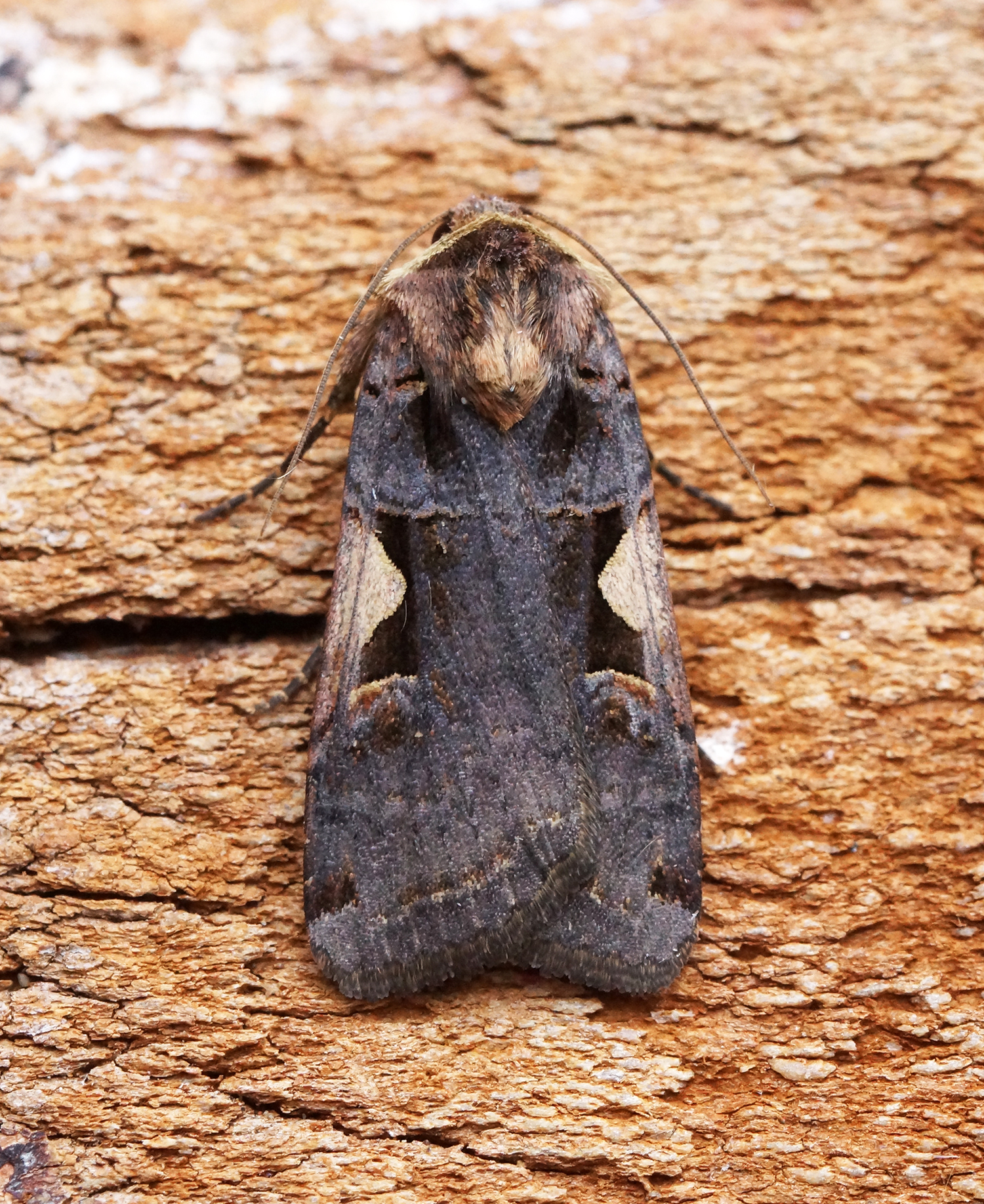

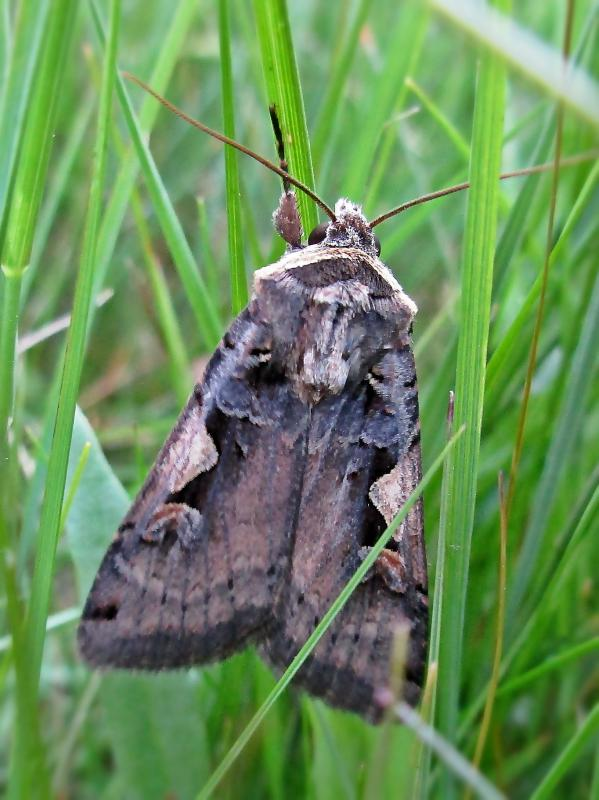

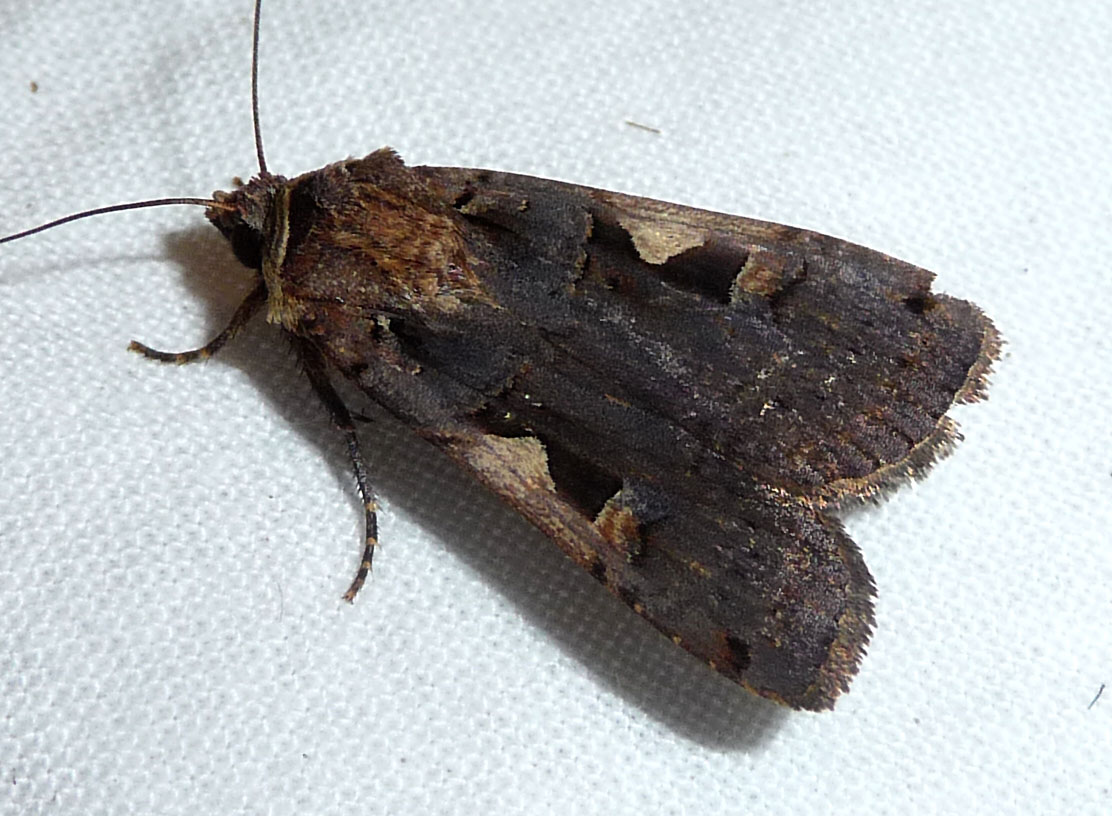

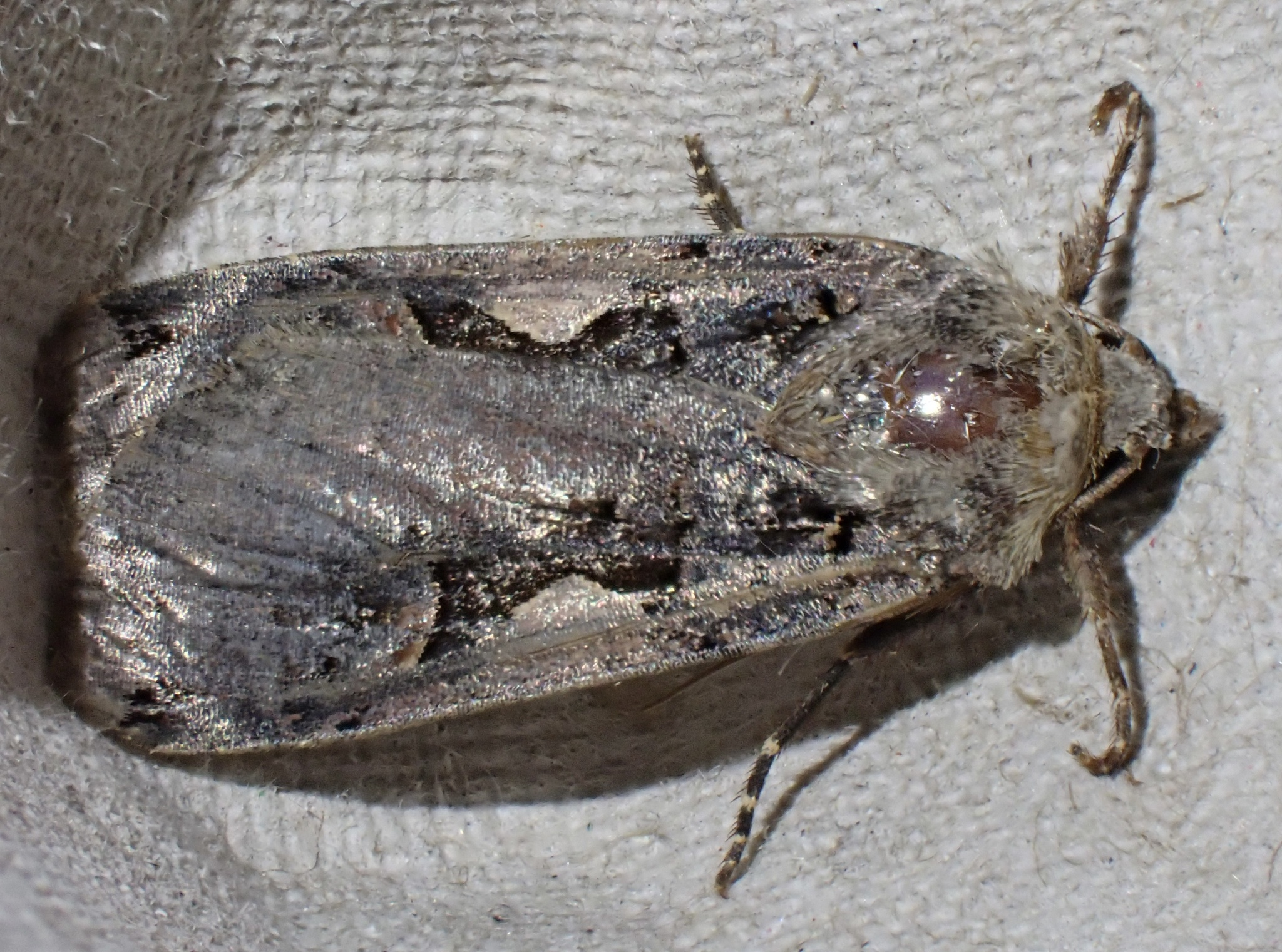

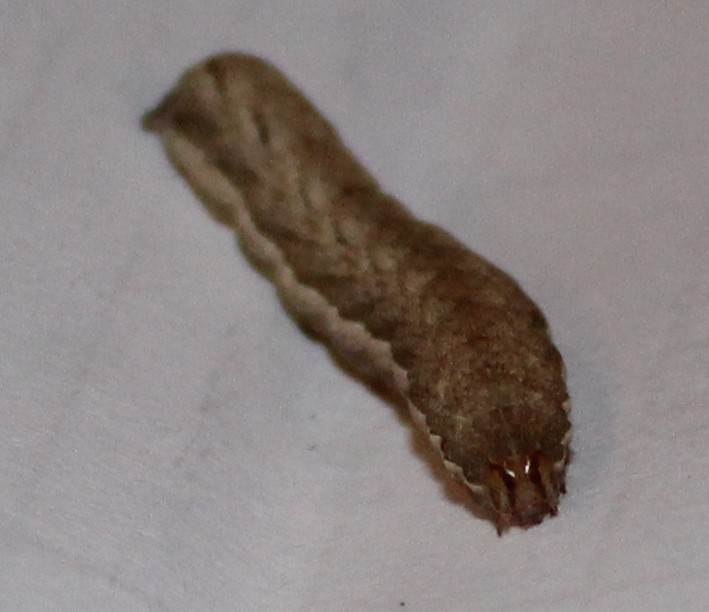

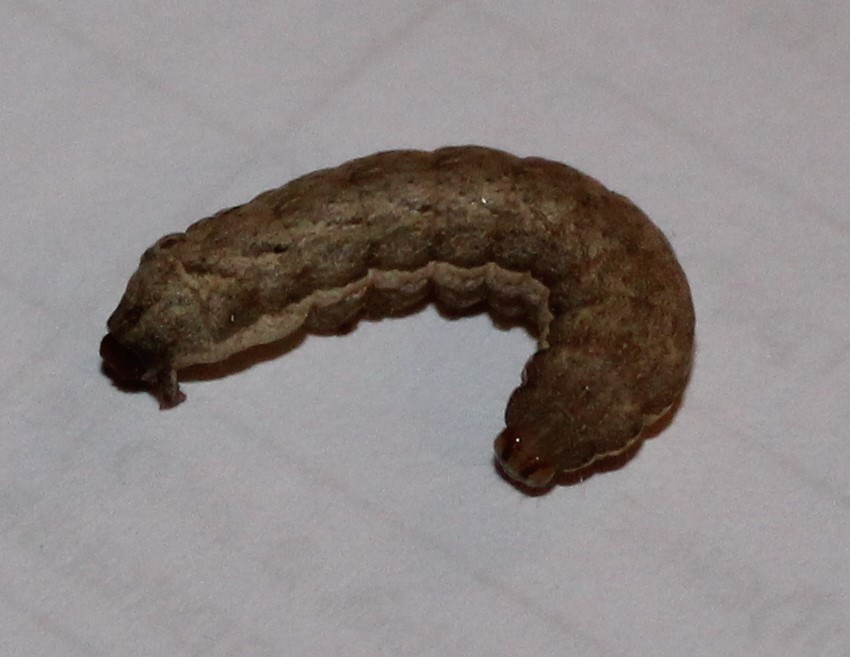

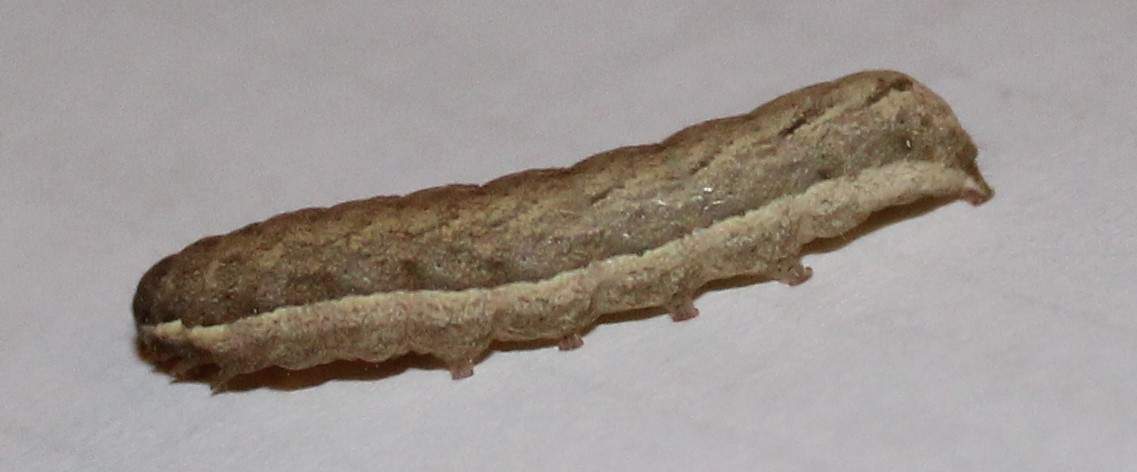

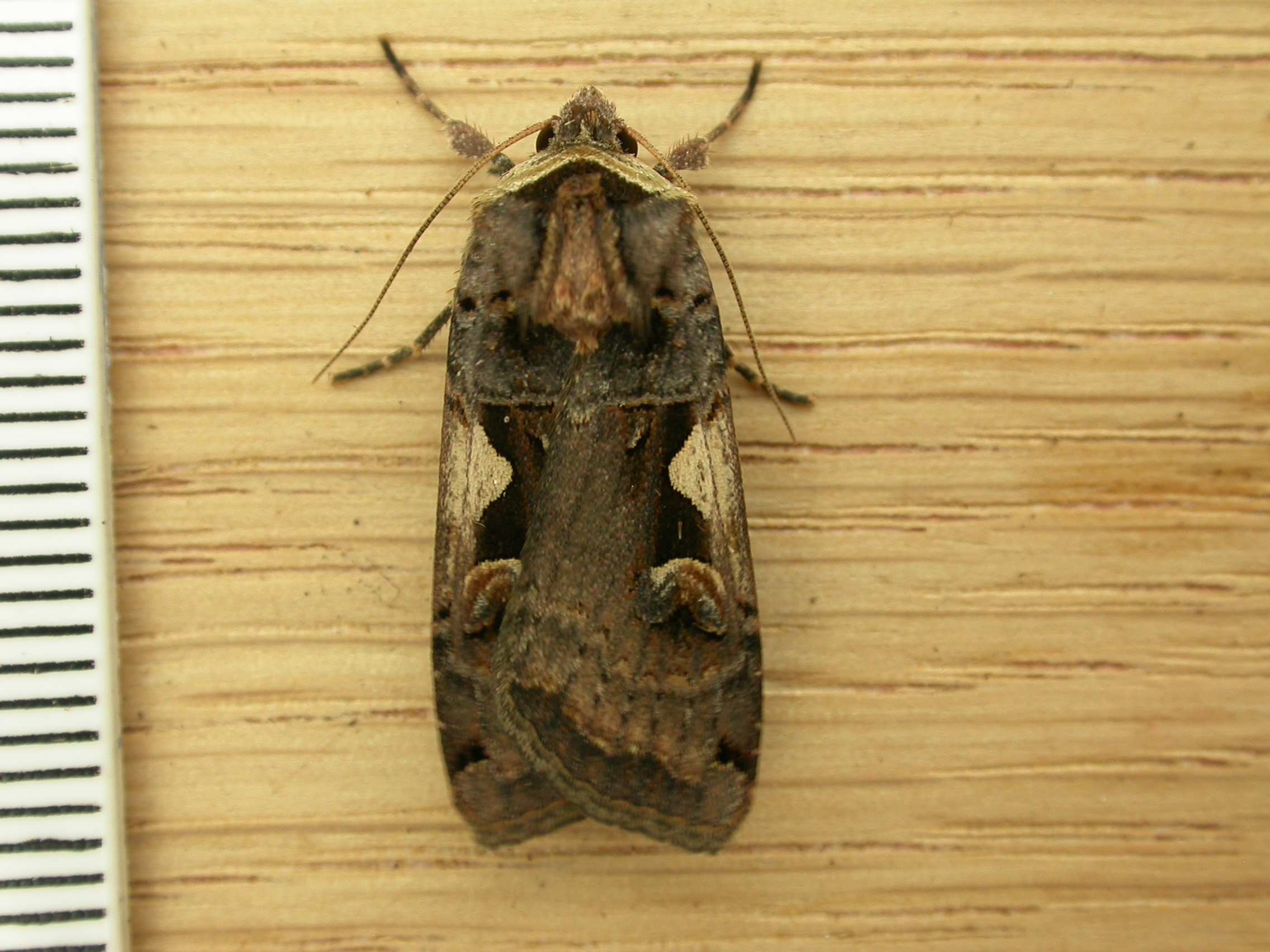

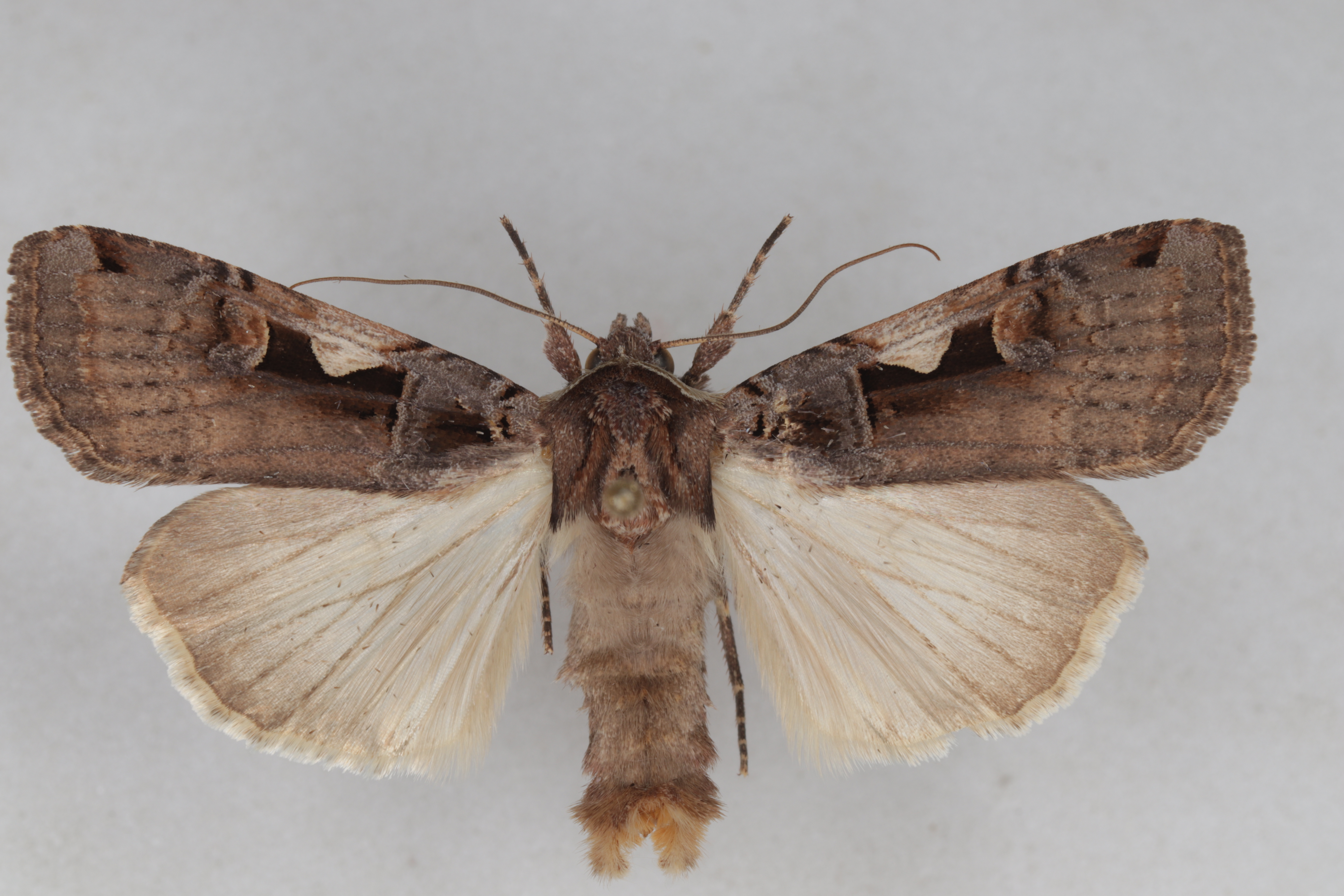

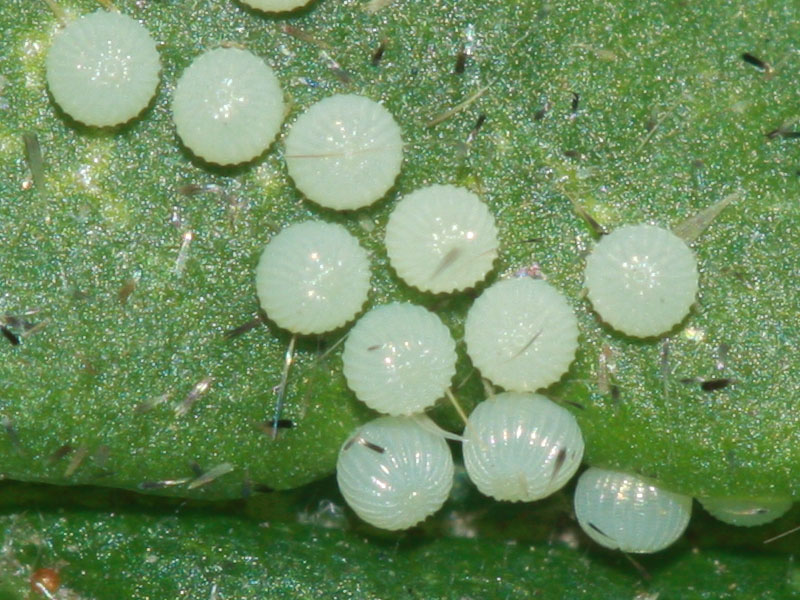

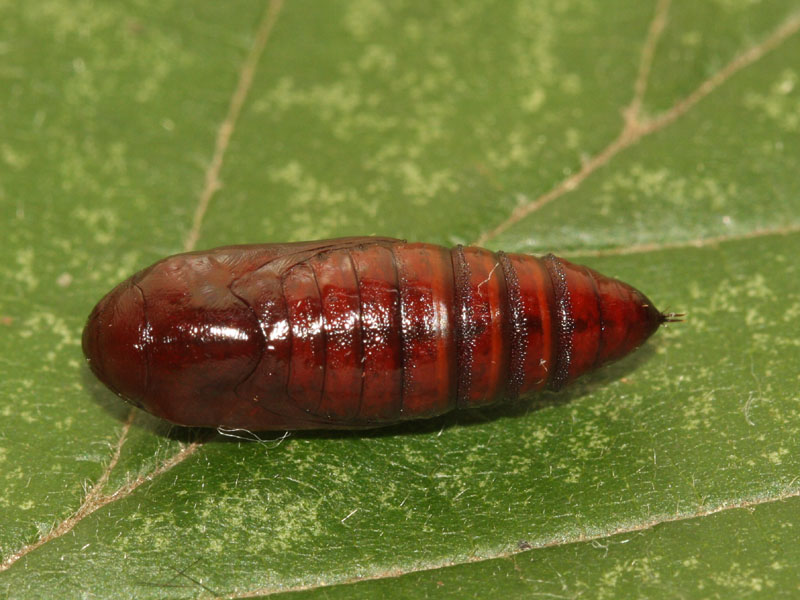

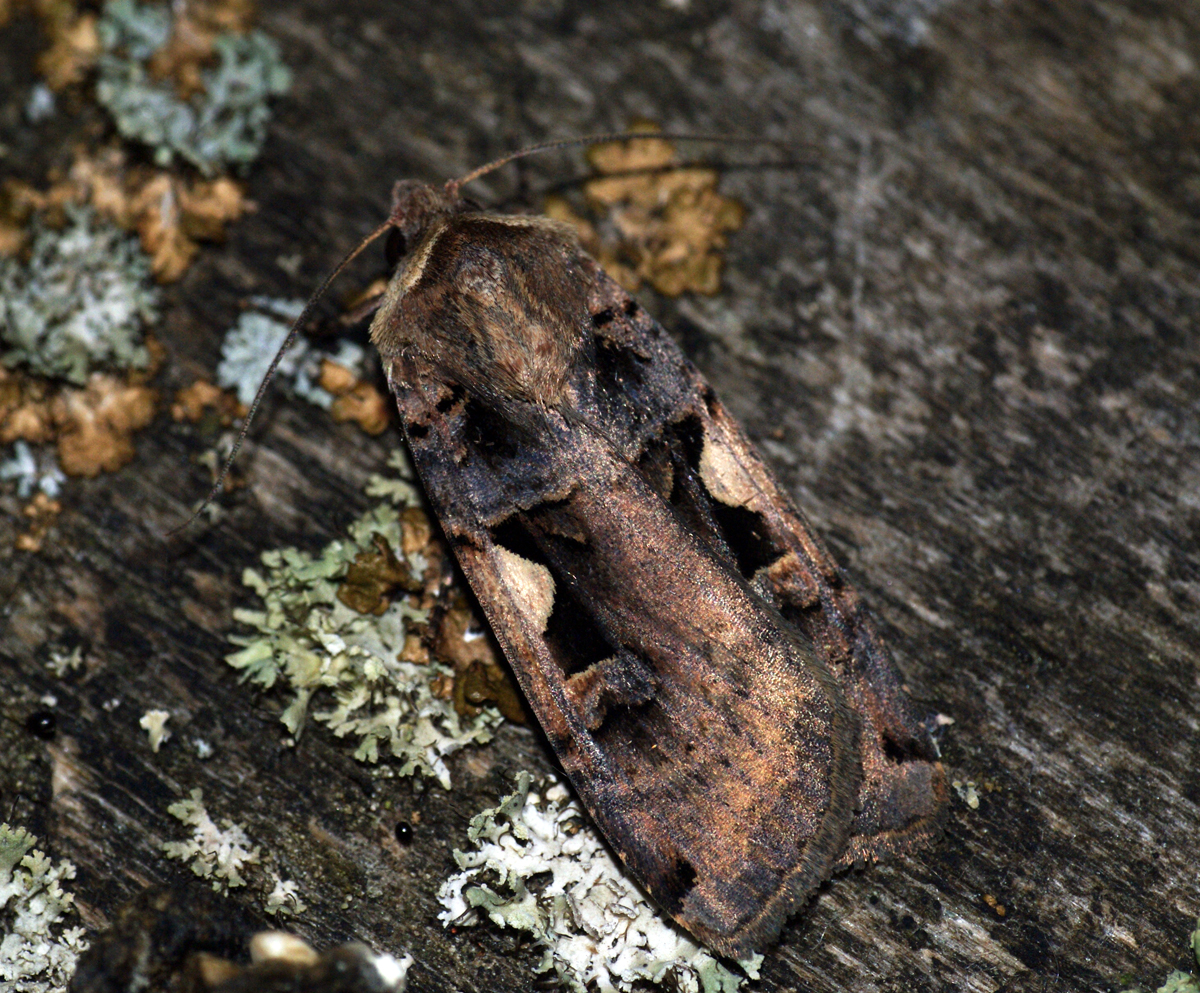

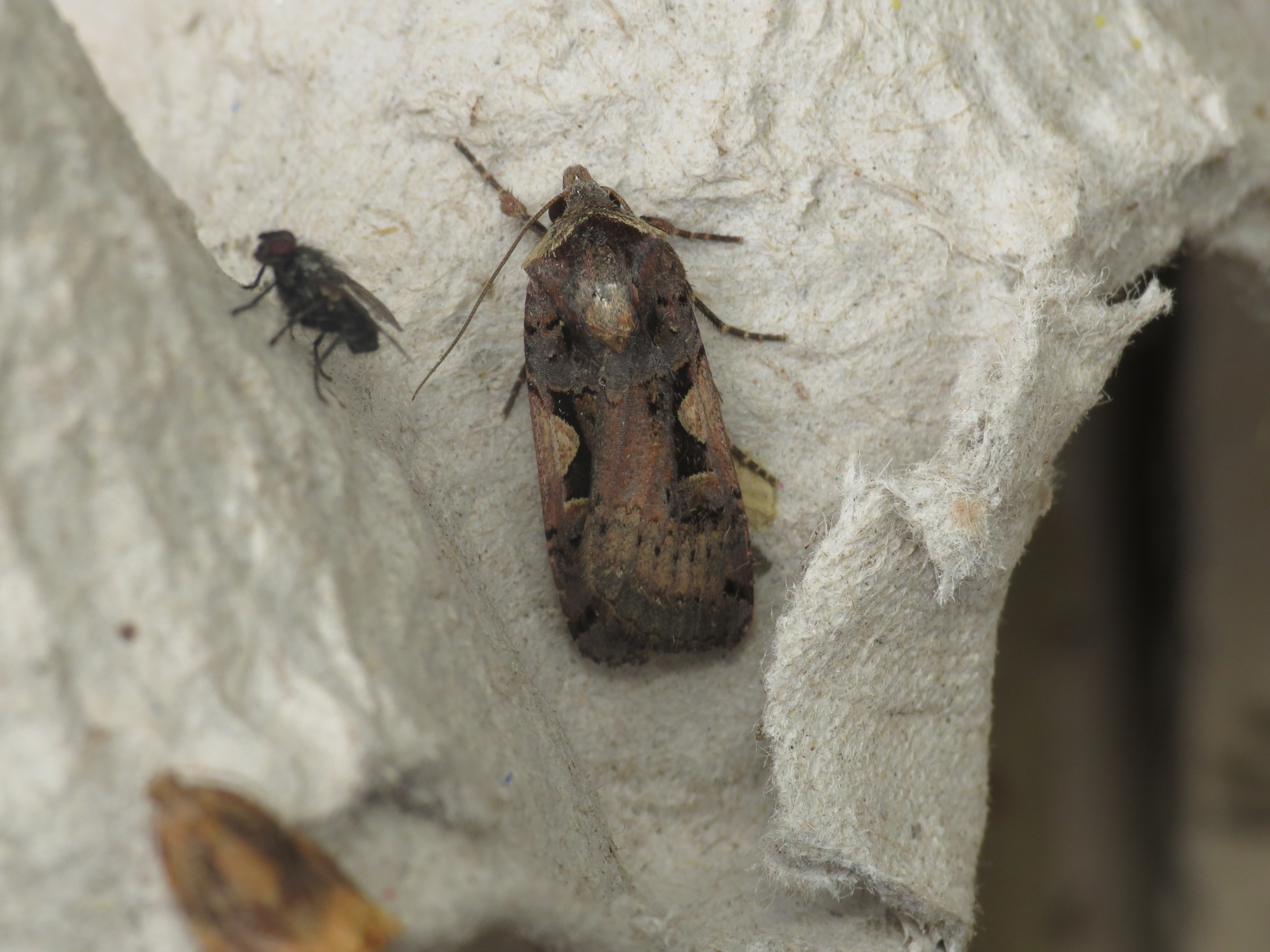

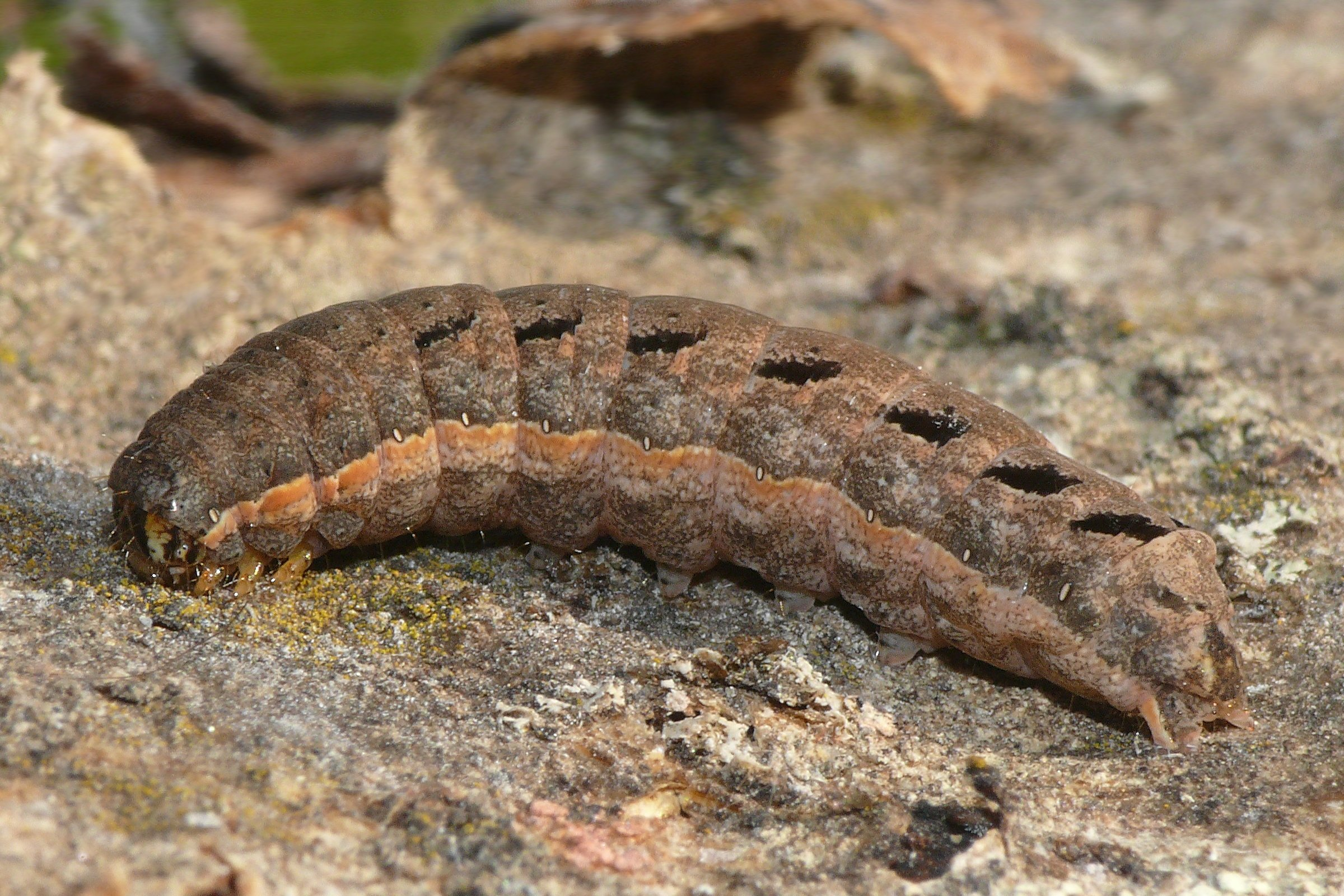

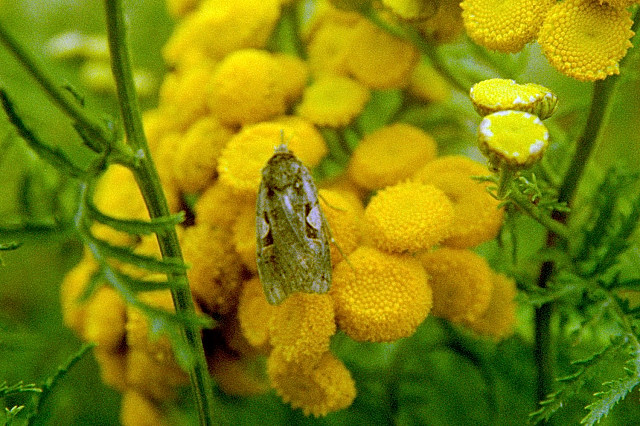

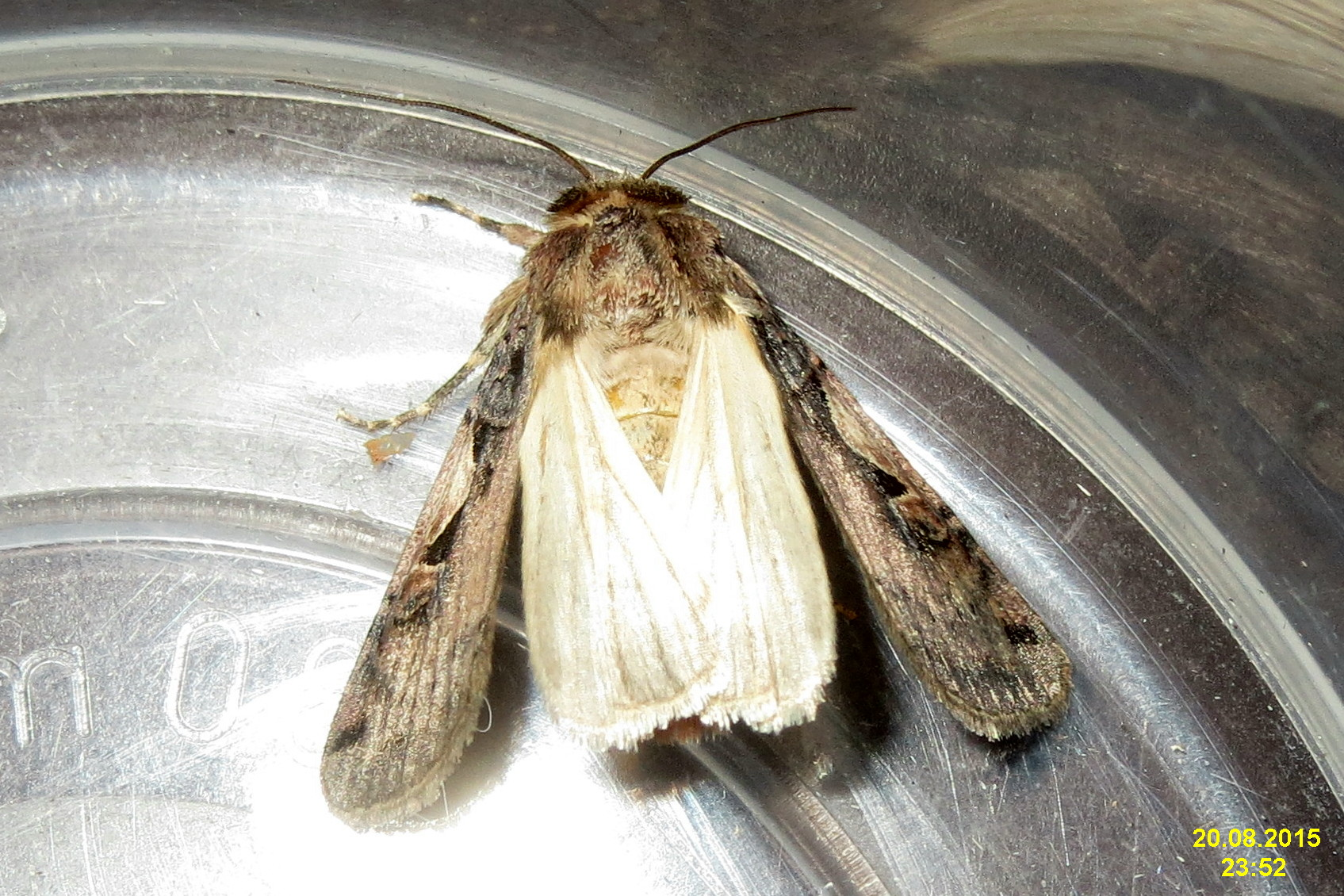

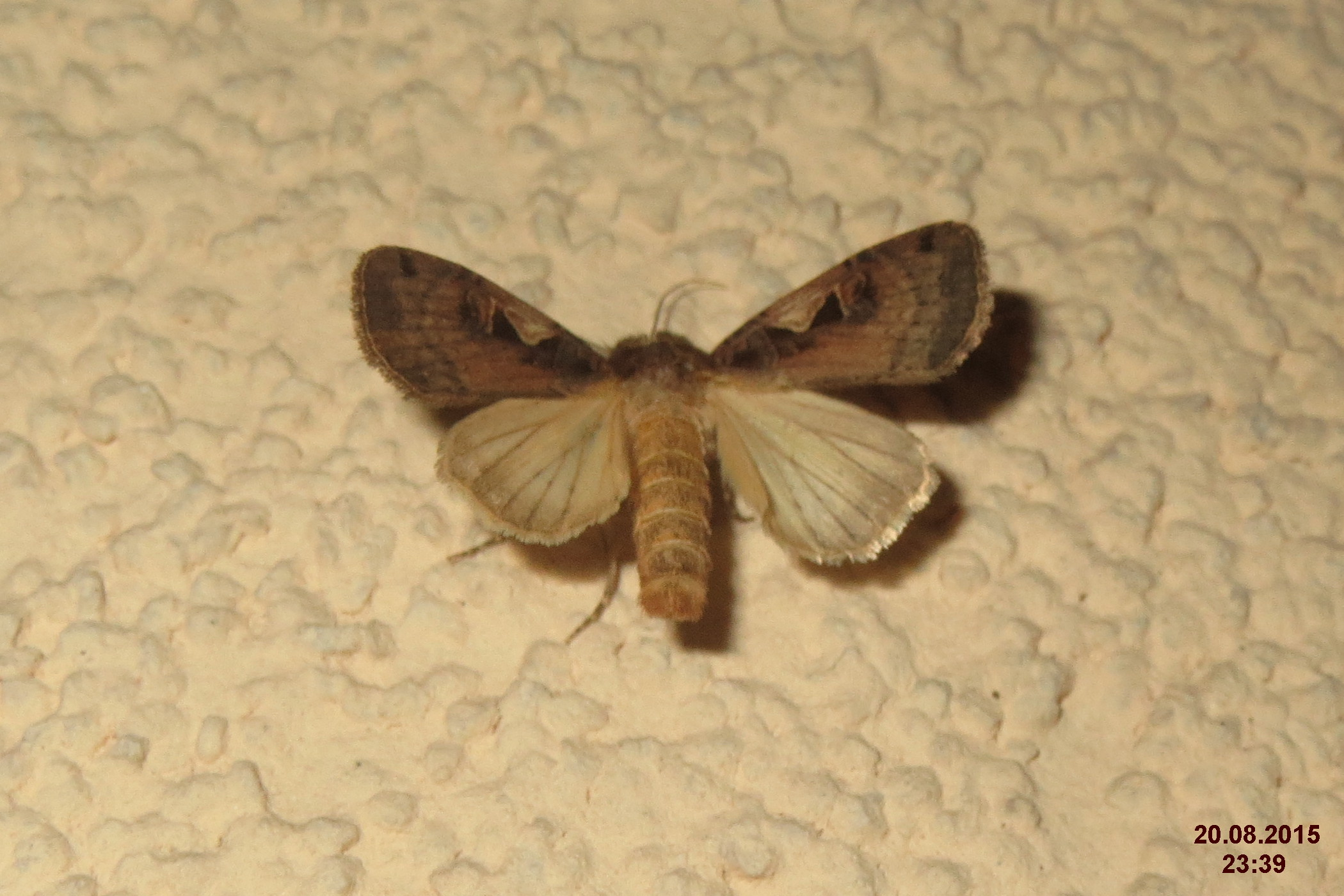

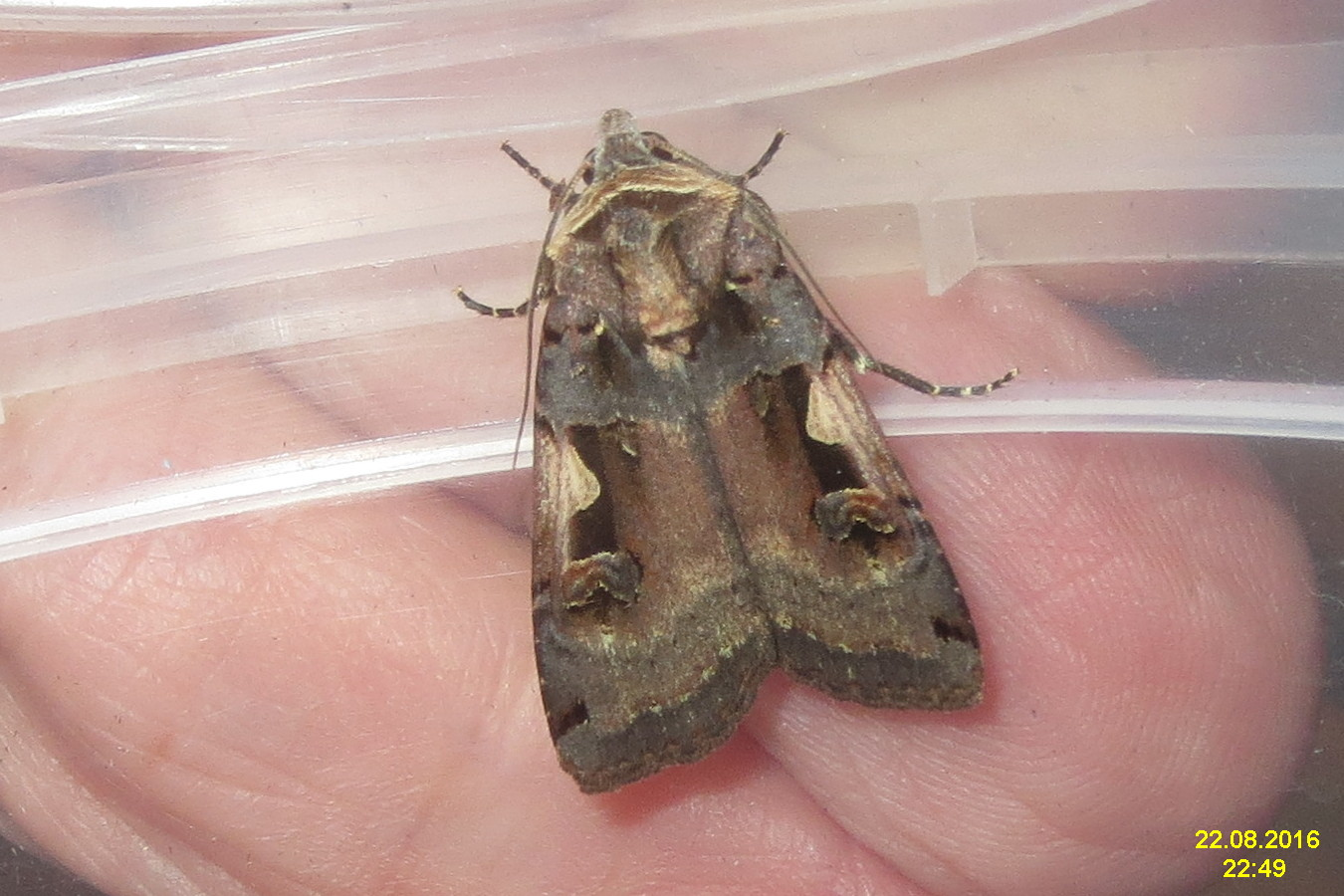

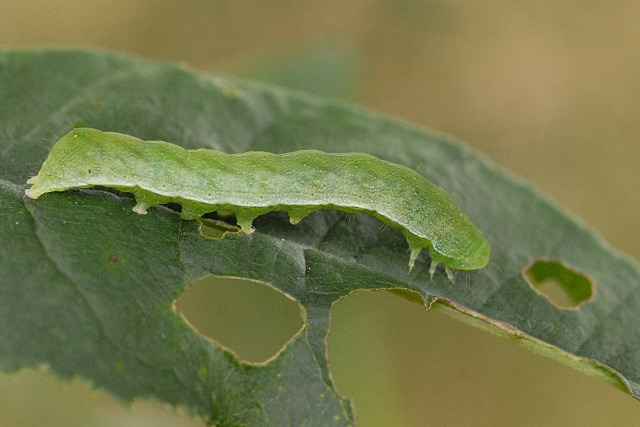

== See also ==
- Hebrew character (Orthosia gothica), another moth species with similar markings
- Polygrammate hebraeicum
