= Araea =

Araea may refer to:

- Araea (letter)
- Araea (moth)
