= Anathetis =

Scientific classification
- Domain: Eukaryota
- Kingdom: Animalia
- Phylum: Arthropoda
- Class: Insecta
- Order: Lepidoptera
- Superfamily: Noctuoidea
- Family: Noctuidae
- Subfamily: Acronictinae
- Genus: Anathetis; Janse, 1938

Genus of moths

Anathetis is a genus of moths of the family Noctuidae. The genus was erected by Anthonie Johannes Theodorus Janse in 1938.

== Species ==
- Anathetis atrirena (Hampson, 1902) South Africa, Namibia
- Anathetis diversa Berio, 1976 Zaire
- Anathetis melanofascia Janse, 1938 Zimbabwe, South Africa
