= Anthracia =

Scientific classification
- Kingdom: Animalia
- Phylum: Arthropoda
- Clade: Pancrustacea
- Class: Insecta
- Order: Lepidoptera
- Superfamily: Noctuoidea
- Family: Noctuidae
- Subfamily: Acronictinae
- Genus: Anthracia; Hübner, [1823]

Synonyms
- Micromania Christoph, 1893; Scioptila Warren, 1912

Genus of moths

Anthracia is a genus of moths of the family Noctuidae. The genus was erected by Jacob Hübner in 1823.

== Species ==
- Anthracia ephialtes (Hübner, [1822])
- Anthracia eriopoda (Herrich-Schäffer, 1851)
- Anthracia sublimbatus (Püngeler, 1900)
- Anthracia submarginata (Bang-Haas, 1927)
- Anthracia subsignatus (Draudt, 1950)
- Anthracia turcomanica (Christoph, 1893)
