= Atrephes =

Scientific classification
- Domain: Eukaryota
- Kingdom: Animalia
- Phylum: Arthropoda
- Class: Insecta
- Order: Lepidoptera
- Superfamily: Noctuoidea
- Family: Noctuidae
- Subfamily: Acronictinae
- Genus: Atrephes; E. D. Jones, 1908

Genus of moths

Atrephes is a genus of moths of the family Noctuidae. The genus was erected by E. Dukinfield Jones in 1908.

== Species ==
- Atrephes albiluna Hampson, 1908 Brazil (Rio Grande do Sul)
- Atrephes phocea Jones, 1908 Brazil (Paraná)
