= Lophonycta =

Scientific classification
- Kingdom: Animalia
- Phylum: Arthropoda
- Clade: Pancrustacea
- Class: Insecta
- Order: Lepidoptera
- Superfamily: Noctuoidea
- Family: Noctuidae
- Subfamily: Acronictinae
- Genus: Lophonycta; Sugi, 1970

Genus of moths

Lophonycta is a genus of moths of the family Noctuidae erected by Shigero Sugi in 1970.

== Species ==
- Lophonycta confusa (Leech, 1889) Japan
- Lophonycta neoconfusa Chang, 1991 Taiwan
