= Calymniodes =

Scientific classification
- Domain: Eukaryota
- Kingdom: Animalia
- Phylum: Arthropoda
- Class: Insecta
- Order: Lepidoptera
- Superfamily: Noctuoidea
- Family: Noctuidae
- Subfamily: Acronictinae
- Genus: Calymniodes; Dognin, 1907

Genus of moths

Calymniodes is a genus of moths of the family Noctuidae. The genus was erected by Paul Dognin in 1907.

== Species ==
- Calymniodes acamas (Herrich-Schäffer, [1869]) Venezuela
- Calymniodes conchylis (Guenée, 1852) Brazil
- Calymniodes pyrostrota Dognin, 1907 Peru
- Calymniodes turcica H. Druce, 1908 Peru
