= Licha =

Scientific classification
- Kingdom: Animalia
- Phylum: Arthropoda
- Clade: Pancrustacea
- Class: Insecta
- Order: Lepidoptera
- Superfamily: Noctuoidea
- Family: Noctuidae
- Subfamily: Acronictinae
- Genus: Licha; Walker, 1859
- Species: L. undilinealis

Binomial name
- Licha undilinealis Walker, 1859

Synonyms
- Generic: Bononia Walker, 1862; Tendarba Walker, [1866]; Specific: Bonomia niveilinea Walker, 1862; Tendarba lineosa Walker, [1866]; Leucania cicatrix Felder & Rogenhofer, 1874

Genus of moths

Licha is a monotypic genus of moths in the family Noctuidae. Its only species, Licha undilinealis, is found in Venezuela and the Brazilian state of Rio de Janeiro. Both the genus and species were first described by Francis Walker in 1859.
