= Apocalymnia =

Scientific classification
- Kingdom: Animalia
- Phylum: Arthropoda
- Class: Insecta
- Order: Lepidoptera
- Superfamily: Noctuoidea
- Family: Noctuidae
- Subfamily: Acronictinae
- Genus: Apocalymnia; Hampson, 1908
- Species: A. tenebrosa

Binomial name
- Apocalymnia tenebrosa (Hampson, 1902)

Synonyms
- Caradrina tenebrosa Hampson, 1902

Genus of moths

Apocalymnia is a monotypic moth genus of the family Noctuidae. Its only species, Apocalymnia tenebrosa, is found in the Indian state of Andhra Pradesh. Both the genus and species were first described by George Hampson, the genus in 1908 and the species six years earlier in 1902.
