= Alika typica =

Scientific classification
- Kingdom: Animalia
- Phylum: Arthropoda
- Class: Insecta
- Order: Lepidoptera
- Superfamily: Noctuoidea
- Family: Noctuidae
- Subfamily: Acronictinae
- Genus: Alika; Strand, 1920
- Species: A. typica

Binomial name
- Alika typica Strand, 1920

Species of moth

Alika is a monotypic moth genus of the family Noctuidae. Its only species, Alika typica, is found in Taiwan. Both the genus and species were first described by Strand in 1920.
