= Argyrospila =

Scientific classification
- Domain: Eukaryota
- Kingdom: Animalia
- Phylum: Arthropoda
- Class: Insecta
- Order: Lepidoptera
- Superfamily: Noctuoidea
- Family: Noctuidae
- Subfamily: Acronictinae
- Genus: Argyrospila; Herrich-Schäffer, 1851

Genus of moths

Argyrospila is a genus of moths of the family Noctuidae.

== Species ==
- Argyrospila striata Staudinger, 1897
- Argyrospila succinea (Esper, [1798])
