= Amiana =

Scientific classification
- Domain: Eukaryota
- Kingdom: Animalia
- Phylum: Arthropoda
- Class: Insecta
- Order: Lepidoptera
- Superfamily: Noctuoidea
- Family: Noctuidae
- Subfamily: Acronictinae
- Genus: Amiana; Dyar, 1904
- Species: A. niama

Binomial name
- Amiana niama Dyar, 1904

Genus of moths

Amiana is a monotypic moth genus of the family Noctuidae. Its only species, Amiana niama, is found in the US state of Arizona. Both the genus and species were first described by Harrison Gray Dyar Jr. in 1904.
