= Apsaranycta =

Scientific classification
- Kingdom: Animalia
- Phylum: Arthropoda
- Class: Insecta
- Order: Lepidoptera
- Superfamily: Noctuoidea
- Family: Noctuidae
- Subfamily: Acronictinae
- Genus: Apsaranycta; Hampson, 1914
- Species: A. bryophilina

Binomial name
- Apsaranycta bryophilina Hampson, 1914

Genus of moths

Apsaranycta is a monotypic moth genus of the family Noctuidae. Its only species, Apsaranycta bryophilina, is found in Mumbai, India. Both the genus and species were first described by George Hampson in 1914.
