= Amefrontia =

Scientific classification
- Kingdom: Animalia
- Phylum: Arthropoda
- Class: Insecta
- Order: Lepidoptera
- Superfamily: Noctuoidea
- Family: Noctuidae
- Subfamily: Acronictinae
- Genus: Amefrontia; Hampson, 1899

Genus of moths

Amefrontia is a genus of moths of the family Noctuidae. The genus was erected by George Hampson in 1899.

== Species ==
- Amefrontia monochroma Hacker, 2016 Yemen
- Amefrontia purpurea Hampson, 1899 Socotra, Kenya, Zimbabwe
- Amefrontia zillii Hacker, Hoppe, Lehmann & Stadie, 2011 Oman, Yemen
