= Pumora =

Scientific classification
- Domain: Eukaryota
- Kingdom: Animalia
- Phylum: Arthropoda
- Class: Insecta
- Order: Lepidoptera
- Superfamily: Noctuoidea
- Family: Noctuidae
- Subfamily: Acronictinae
- Genus: Pumora; Dyar, 1918
- Species: P. hyperion

Binomial name
- Pumora hyperion Dyar, 1918

Synonyms
- Cirrhophanus hyperion

Genus of moths

Pumora is a monotypic moth genus of the family Noctuidae. Its only species, Pumora hyperion, is found in Mexico. Both the genus and species were first described by Harrison Gray Dyar Jr. in 1918.
