= Andobana =

Scientific classification
- Kingdom: Animalia
- Phylum: Arthropoda
- Class: Insecta
- Order: Lepidoptera
- Superfamily: Noctuoidea
- Family: Noctuidae
- Subfamily: Acronictinae
- Genus: Andobana; Viette, 1865

Genus of moths

Andobana is a genus of moths of the family Noctuidae.

== Species ==
- Andobana duchesnei (Viette, 1959)
- Andobana multipunctata (Druce, 1899)
