= Aucha velans =

Scientific classification
- Kingdom: Animalia
- Phylum: Arthropoda
- Class: Insecta
- Order: Lepidoptera
- Superfamily: Noctuoidea
- Family: Noctuidae
- Genus: Aucha
- Species: A. velans

Binomial name
- Aucha velans Walker, [1858]

Species of moth

Aucha velans, the tide-watching mangrove moth, is a moth of the family Noctuidae. The species was first described by Francis Walker in 1858. It is found in Sri Lanka, Singapore and Philippines.

The adult has a wingspan of 28–35 mm. They are found on the stems of Avicennia mangroves in a characteristic position where adults perch head down on tree trunks. Caterpillars are edge feeders of Avicennia species. Late instars reach the ground and pupate inter-tidally under rotting logs or in algal mats. They are major pests on mangroves and considered as severe defoliators.
