= Androlymnia =

Scientific classification
- Kingdom: Animalia
- Phylum: Arthropoda
- Class: Insecta
- Order: Lepidoptera
- Superfamily: Noctuoidea
- Family: Noctuidae
- Subfamily: Acronictinae
- Genus: Androlymnia; Hampson, 1908

Genus of moths

Androlymnia is a genus of moths of the family Noctuidae.

== Species ==
- Androlymnia clavata Hampson, 1910
- Androlymnia clavata Hampson, 1910
- Androlymnia difformis Roepke, 1938
- Androlymnia emarginata (Hampson, 1891)
- Androlymnia incurvata (Wileman & West, 1929)
- Androlymnia malgassica Viette, 1965
- Androlymnia torsivena (Hampson, 1902)
