= Auchecranon =

Scientific classification
- Domain: Eukaryota
- Kingdom: Animalia
- Phylum: Arthropoda
- Class: Insecta
- Order: Lepidoptera
- Superfamily: Noctuoidea
- Family: Noctuidae
- Subfamily: Acronictinae
- Genus: Auchecranon; Berio, 1979
- Species: A. elegans

Binomial name
- Auchecranon elegans Berio, 1979

Genus of moths

Auchecranon is a monotypic moth genus of the family Noctuidae. Its only species, Auchecranon elegans, is found in Kenya. Both the genus and species were first described by Emilio Berio in 1979.
