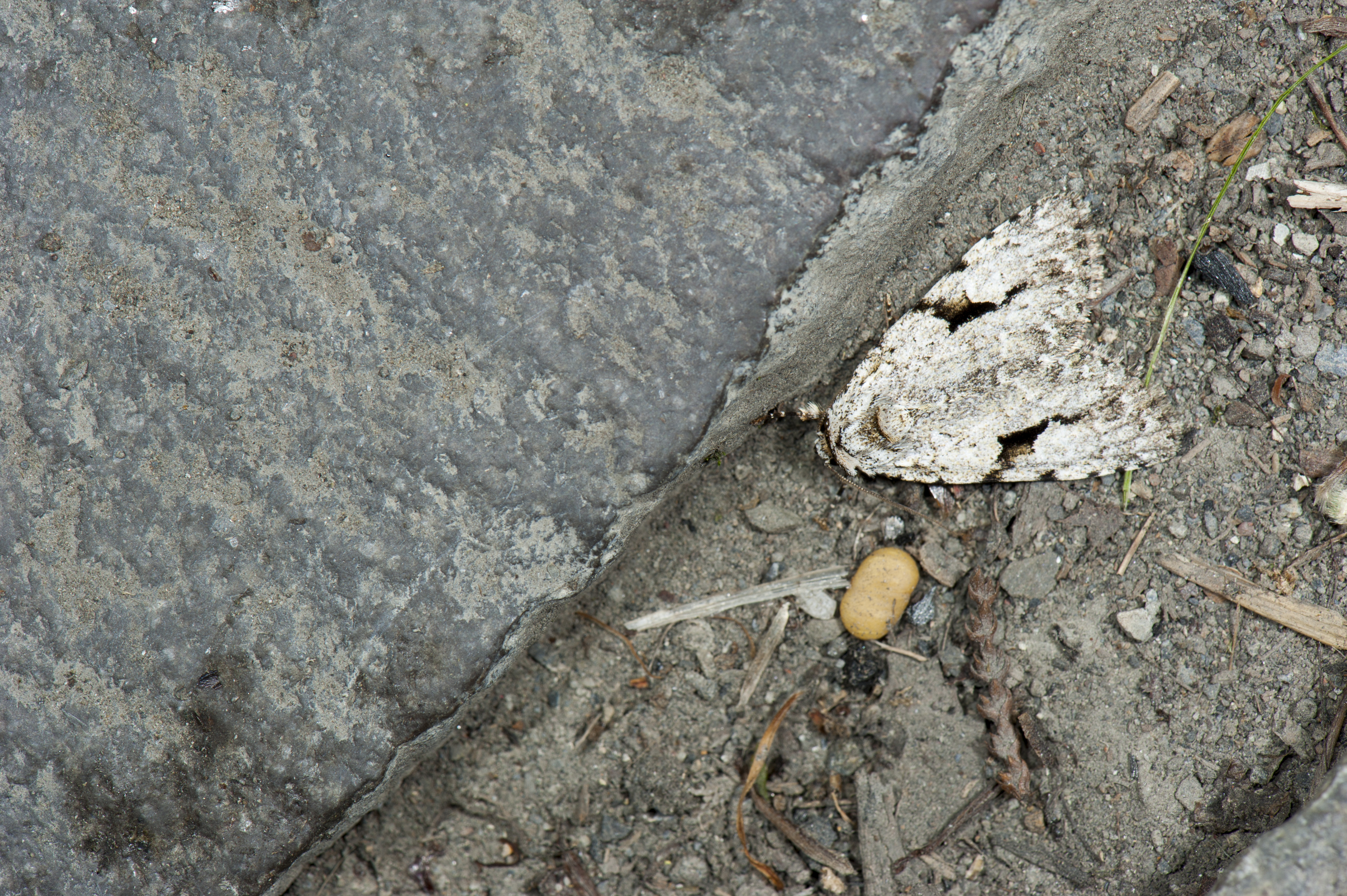
- Subleuconycta palshkovi

Scientific classification
- Domain: Eukaryota
- Kingdom: Animalia
- Phylum: Arthropoda
- Class: Insecta
- Order: Lepidoptera
- Superfamily: Noctuoidea
- Family: Noctuidae
- Subfamily: Acronictinae
- Genus: Subleuconycta; Kozhanchikov, 1950

= Subleuconycta =

Genus of moths

Subleuconycta is a genus of moths of the family Noctuidae. The genus was erected by Igor Vasilii Kozhanchikov (Kozhantshikov) in 1950.

== Species ==
- Subleuconycta calonesiota Kiss, Wu & Matov, 2017 Taiwan
- Subleuconycta palshkovi (Filipjev, 1937) Ussuri, Korea, north-eastern China, Japan
- Subleuconycta sola Gyulai & Saldaitis, 2017 Sichuan
- Subleuconycta sugii Boursin, 1962 Taiwan
