= Anereuthinula =

Scientific classification
- Domain: Eukaryota
- Kingdom: Animalia
- Phylum: Arthropoda
- Class: Insecta
- Order: Lepidoptera
- Superfamily: Noctuoidea
- Family: Noctuidae
- Subfamily: Acronictinae
- Genus: Anereuthinula; Strand, 1920
- Species: A. lyncestidis

Binomial name
- Anereuthinula lyncestidis Strand, 1920

Genus of moths

Anereuthinula is a monotypic moth genus of the family Noctuidae. Its only species, Anereuthinula lyncestidis, is found in Taiwan. Both the genus and species were first described by Strand in 1920.
