= Anedhella =

Scientific classification
- Kingdom: Animalia
- Phylum: Arthropoda
- Class: Insecta
- Order: Lepidoptera
- Superfamily: Noctuoidea
- Family: Noctuidae
- Subfamily: Acronictinae
- Genus: Anedhella; Viette, 1965

Genus of moths

Anedhella is a genus of moths of the family Noctuidae. The genus was described by Viette in 1965.

== Species ==
- Anedhella boisduvali Viette, 1965 Madagascar
- Anedhella interrupta (Janse, 1938) South Africa, Tanzania
- Anedhella nigrivittata (Hampson, 1902) Zaire, Zimbabwe, Zambia, South Africa
- Anedhella rectiradiata (Hampson, 1902) Botswana, Namibia, Zimbabwe, Tanzania, South Africa
- Anedhella stigmata (Janse, 1938) Zimbabwe, Zaire, Tanzania
- Anedhella thermodesa (Viette, 1958) Madagascar
