= Uniramodes =

Scientific classification
- Domain: Eukaryota
- Kingdom: Animalia
- Phylum: Arthropoda
- Class: Insecta
- Order: Lepidoptera
- Superfamily: Noctuoidea
- Family: Noctuidae
- Subfamily: Acronictinae
- Genus: Uniramodes; Berio, 1976
- Species: U. unicolor

Binomial name
- Uniramodes unicolor Berio, 1976

Genus of moths

Uniramodes is a monotypic moth genus of the family Noctuidae. Its only species, Uniramodes unicolor, is found in Tanzania. Both the genus and species were first described by Emilio Berio in 1976.
