= Libyphaenis =

Scientific classification
- Kingdom: Animalia
- Phylum: Arthropoda
- Class: Insecta
- Order: Lepidoptera
- Superfamily: Noctuoidea
- Family: Noctuidae
- Subfamily: Acronictinae
- Genus: Libyphaenis; Hampson, 1918
- Species: L. virescens

Binomial name
- Libyphaenis virescens Hampson, 1918

Genus of moths

Libyphaenis is a monotypic moth genus of the family Noctuidae. Its only species, Libyphaenis virescens, is found in southern Nigeria. Both the genus and species were first described by George Hampson in 1918.
