= Madeuplexia =

Scientific classification
- Kingdom: Animalia
- Phylum: Arthropoda
- Class: Insecta
- Order: Lepidoptera
- Superfamily: Noctuoidea
- Family: Noctuidae
- Subfamily: Acronictinae
- Genus: Madeuplexia; Viette, 1960

Genus of moths

Madeuplexia is a genus of moths of the family Noctuidae from Madagascar. The genus was erected by Pierre Viette in 1960.

== Taxonomy ==
Some sources place this name as a synonym of Phlogophora Treitschke, 1825.

== Species ==
- Madeuplexia altitudinis Viette, 1960
- Madeuplexia camusi Viette, 1967
- Madeuplexia pretiosa Viette, 1960
- Madeuplexia retorta (Berio, 1956)
- Madeuplexia sogai Viette, 1960
