= Agrotisia =

Scientific classification
- Kingdom: Animalia
- Phylum: Arthropoda
- Class: Insecta
- Order: Lepidoptera
- Superfamily: Noctuoidea
- Family: Noctuidae
- Subfamily: Acronictinae
- Genus: Agrotisia; Hampson, 1908

Genus of moths

Agrotisia is a genus of moths of the family Noctuidae.

== Species ==
- Agrotisia evelinae Benjamin, 1933
- Agrotisia subhyalina Hampson, 1908
- Agrotisia williamsi (Schaus, 1923)
