= Argyrhoda =

Scientific classification
- Kingdom: Animalia
- Phylum: Arthropoda
- Class: Insecta
- Order: Lepidoptera
- Superfamily: Noctuoidea
- Family: Noctuidae
- Subfamily: Acronictinae
- Genus: Argyrhoda; Hampson, 1908
- Species: A. laronia

Binomial name
- Argyrhoda laronia (H. Druce, 1890)

Synonyms
- Thalpochares laronia H. Druce, 1890

Genus of moths

Argyrhoda is a monotypic moth genus of the family Noctuidae erected by George Hampson in 1908. Its only species, Argyrhoda laronia, was first described by Herbert Druce in 1890. It is found in Mexico.
