= Narcotica =

Scientific classification
- Kingdom: Animalia
- Phylum: Arthropoda
- Clade: Pancrustacea
- Class: Insecta
- Order: Lepidoptera
- Superfamily: Noctuoidea
- Family: Noctuidae
- Subfamily: Acronictinae
- Genus: Narcotica; Sugi in Inoue, Sugi, Kuroko, Moriuti & Kawabe, 1982

Genus of moths

Narcotica is a genus of moths of the family Noctuidae. The genus was erected by Shigero Sugi in 1982.

== Species ==
- Narcotica cryptica Kiss, Choi & Han, 2018 South Korea, China (Zhejiang, Jiangxi, Shanxi)
- Narcotica hoenei Kiss, Choi & Han, 2018 China (Shanghai, Zhejiang, Shaanxi, Sichuan)
- Narcotica niveosparsa (Matsumura, 1926) Japan, Korea, south-eastern China
