= Antachara =

Scientific classification
- Kingdom: Animalia
- Phylum: Arthropoda
- Class: Insecta
- Order: Lepidoptera
- Superfamily: Noctuoidea
- Family: Noctuidae
- Subfamily: Acronictinae
- Genus: Antachara; Walker, 1858

Genus of moths

Antachara is a genus of moths of the family Noctuidae.

== Species ==
- Antachara denterna (Guenée, 1852)
- Antachara diminuta (Guenée, 1852)
- Antachara mexicana (Hampson, 1909)
