= Gerbathodes =

Scientific classification
- Domain: Eukaryota
- Kingdom: Animalia
- Phylum: Arthropoda
- Class: Insecta
- Order: Lepidoptera
- Superfamily: Noctuoidea
- Family: Noctuidae
- Subfamily: Acronictinae
- Genus: Gerbathodes; Warren in Seitz, 1911

Synonyms
- Acronictoides Kozhanchikov, 1950

Genus of moths

Gerbathodes is a genus of moths of the family Noctuidae. The genus was described by Warren in 1911.

== Species ==
- Gerbathodes angusta (Butler, 1879) Japan
- Gerbathodes paupera (Staudinger, 1892) Amurland, Korea, Japan, Taiwan
