= Arboricornus =

Scientific classification
- Kingdom: Animalia
- Phylum: Arthropoda
- Class: Insecta
- Order: Lepidoptera
- Superfamily: Noctuoidea
- Family: Noctuidae
- Subfamily: Acronictinae
- Genus: Arboricornus; Hampson, 1894

Genus of moths

Arboricornus is a genus of moths of the family Noctuidae. The genus was erected by George Hampson in 1894.

== Species ==
- Arboricornus chrysopepla (Hampson, 1908) Uganda
- Arboricornus examplata Warren, 1913 India (Meghalaya)
- Arboricornus ruber Hampson, 1894 India (Assam)
