= Ariathisa =

Scientific classification
- Kingdom: Animalia
- Phylum: Arthropoda
- Class: Insecta
- Order: Lepidoptera
- Superfamily: Noctuoidea
- Family: Noctuidae
- Subfamily: Acronictinae
- Genus: Ariathisa; Walker, 1865

Synonyms
- Eulaphygma Butler, 1890

Genus of moths

Ariathisa is a genus of moths of the family Noctuidae. The genus was erected by Francis Walker in 1865.

== Species ==
- Ariathisa abyssinia (Guenée, 1852)
- Ariathisa angulata Gaede, 1935
- Ariathisa semiluna (Hampson, 1909)
- Ariathisa alychnodes Turner, 1939
