= Arcilasisa =

Scientific classification
- Kingdom: Animalia
- Phylum: Arthropoda
- Class: Insecta
- Order: Lepidoptera
- Superfamily: Noctuoidea
- Family: Noctuidae
- Subfamily: Acronictinae
- Genus: Arcilasisa; Walker, 1865
- Species: A. sobria

Binomial name
- Arcilasisa sobria Walker, 1865

Genus of moths

Arcilasisa is a monotypic moth genus of the family Noctuidae. Its only species, Arcilasisa sobria, is found in southern India. Both the genus and species were first described by Francis Walker in 1865.

== Description ==
Its eyes are minutely pubescent. The proboscis is well developed. Palpi obliquely porrect (extending forward) with somewhat long hair below. Thorax and abdomen tuftless. Legs spineless.
