= Anthodes =

Scientific classification
- Domain: Eukaryota
- Kingdom: Animalia
- Phylum: Arthropoda
- Class: Insecta
- Order: Lepidoptera
- Superfamily: Noctuoidea
- Family: Noctuidae
- Subfamily: Acronictinae
- Genus: Anthodes; Dognin, 1914
- Species: A. acynodonta

Binomial name
- Anthodes acynodonta Dognin, 1914

Genus of moths

Anthodes is a monotypic moth genus of the family Noctuidae. Its only species, Anthodes acynodonta, is found in Uruguay. Both the genus and species were first described by Paul Dognin in 1914.
