= Amphilita =

Scientific classification
- Kingdom: Animalia
- Phylum: Arthropoda
- Class: Insecta
- Order: Lepidoptera
- Superfamily: Noctuoidea
- Family: Noctuidae
- Subfamily: Acronictinae
- Genus: Amphilita; Hampson, 1908

Genus of moths

Amphilita is a genus of moths of the family Noctuidae. The genus was erected by George Hampson in 1908.

== Species ==
- Amphilita arcuata (Jones, 1908) Brazil (Paraná)
- Amphilita punctilinea (Jones, 1908) Brazil (São Paulo)
