= Akoniodes =

Scientific classification
- Domain: Eukaryota
- Kingdom: Animalia
- Phylum: Arthropoda
- Class: Insecta
- Order: Lepidoptera
- Superfamily: Noctuoidea
- Family: Noctuidae
- Subfamily: Acronictinae
- Genus: Akoniodes; Matsumura, 1929
- Species: A. kuyanianus

Binomial name
- Akoniodes kuyanianus Matsumura, 1929

Genus of moths

Akoniodes is a monotypic moth genus of the family Noctuidae. Its only species, Akoniodes kuyanianus, is found in Taiwan. Both the genus and species were first described by Shōnen Matsumura in 1929.
