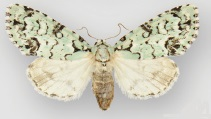
- Female
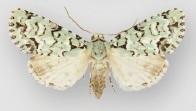
- Male

Scientific classification
- Domain: Eukaryota
- Kingdom: Animalia
- Phylum: Arthropoda
- Class: Insecta
- Order: Lepidoptera
- Superfamily: Noctuoidea
- Family: Noctuidae
- Subfamily: Acronictinae
- Genus: Chloronycta; Schmidt & Anweiler in Schmidt, Wagner, Zacharczenko, Zahiri & Anweiler, 2014
- Species: C. tybo

Binomial name
- Chloronycta tybo (Barnes, 1904)

Synonyms
- Moma tybo Barnes, 1904; Agriopodes tybo

= Chloronycta =

Genus of moths

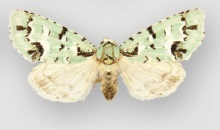
Undescribed Chloronycta species from Turundeo, Mexico

Chloronycta is a currently monotypic moth genus of the family Noctuidae erected by B. Christian Schmidt and Gary G. Anweiler in 2014. Its only species, Chloronycta tybo, was first described by William Barnes in 1904. It is found in mountainous regions from Mexico to south-eastern Arizona and southwestern New Mexico, north to the Sierra Madre Occidental. The habitat consists of canyons and mid-elevation wooded areas, particularly riparian corridors.

The wingspan is about 34 mm for males and 36 mm for females. Adults are on wing in January and from July to September.

The larvae feed on Fraxinus velutina. The first two larval instars are leaf skeletonizers that remove patches of leaf tissue from the lower leaf surface. Middle and late instars feed from a leaf edge, always from the underside of a blade. Last-instar larva reach a length of about 26 mm. They are waxy green with a pale green head. Prior to pupation, the larvae tunnel into punky wood (when available) to form a pupal crypt. This crypt is largely free of silk, with the exception of that used to weave the frass-silk cover.

There is also an undescribed species from Mexico.

== Gallery ==
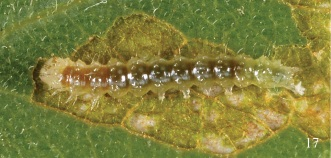
Early-instar larva

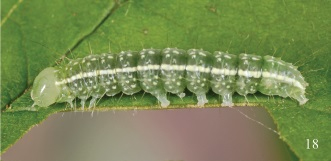
Penultimate-instar larva

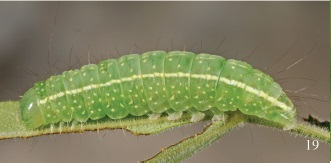
Ultimate-instar larva
