= Araea (moth) =

Scientific classification
- Kingdom: Animalia
- Phylum: Arthropoda
- Class: Insecta
- Order: Lepidoptera
- Superfamily: Noctuoidea
- Family: Noctuidae
- Subfamily: Acronictinae
- Genus: Araea; Hampson, 1908

Synonyms
- Micheneria Orfila & Rossi, 1956

Genus of moths

Araea is a genus of moths of the family Noctuidae. The genus was erected by George Hampson in 1908.

== Species ==
- Araea attenuata Hampson, 1908 Kashmir
- Araea indecora (Felder & Rogenhofer, 1874) South Africa
