= Lucasidia =

Scientific classification
- Kingdom: Animalia
- Phylum: Arthropoda
- Class: Insecta
- Order: Lepidoptera
- Superfamily: Noctuoidea
- Family: Noctuidae
- Genus: Lucasidia; Boursin, 1937
- Species: L. phenax

Binomial name
- Lucasidia phenax Boursin, 1937

Genus of moths

Lucasidia is a monotypic moth genus of the family Noctuidae. Its only species, Lucasidia phenax, is found in Morocco. Both the genus and species were first described by Charles Boursin in 1937.
