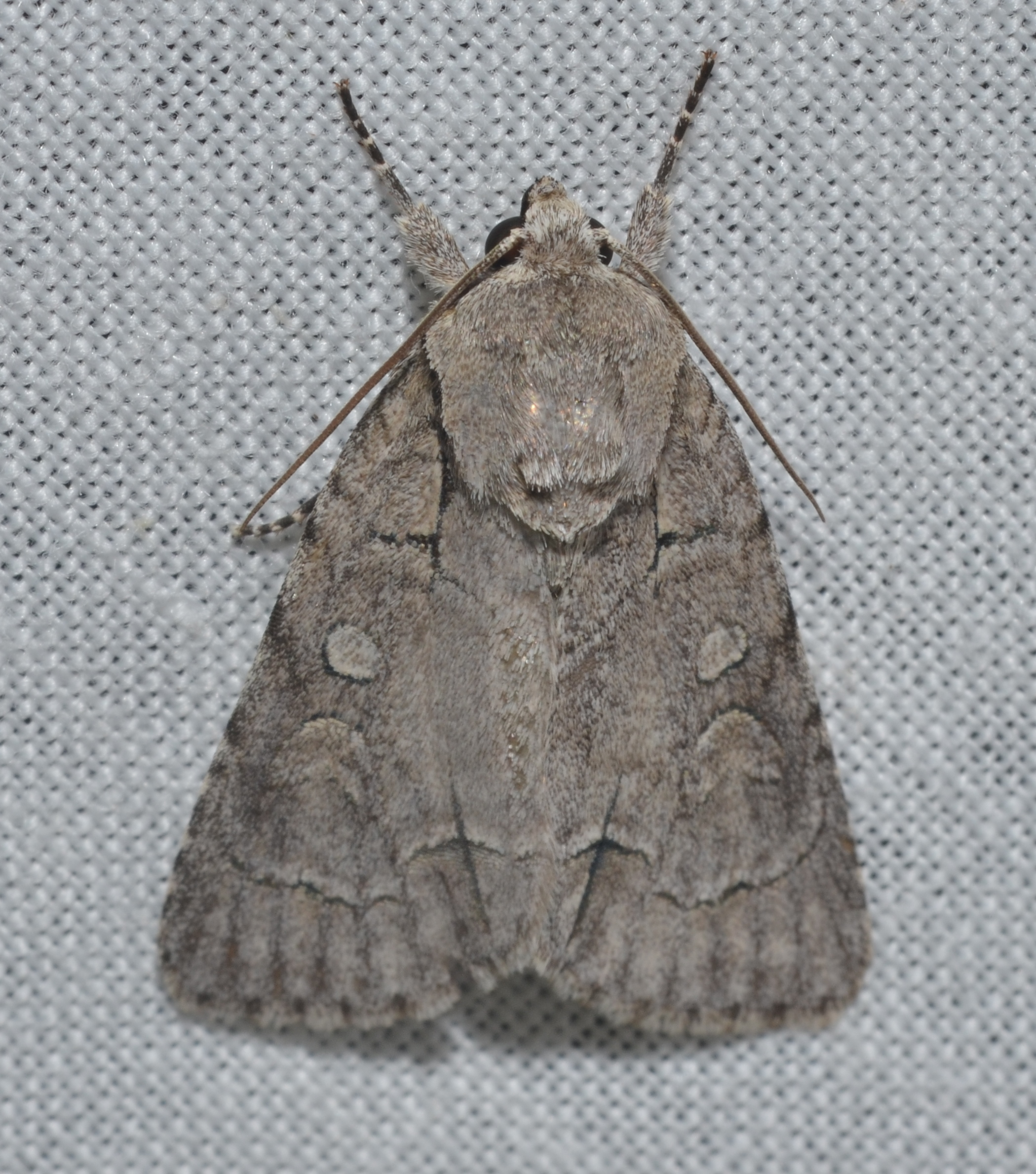

Scientific classification
- Kingdom: Animalia
- Phylum: Arthropoda
- Clade: Pancrustacea
- Class: Insecta
- Order: Lepidoptera
- Superfamily: Noctuoidea
- Family: Noctuidae
- Genus: Acronicta
- Species: A. radcliffei

Binomial name
- Acronicta radcliffei Harvey, 1875

= Acronicta radcliffei =

Radcliffe's dagger moth

Species of moth

Acronicta radcliffei, or Radcliffe's dagger moth, is a moth of the family Noctuidae. The species was first described by Leon F. Harvey in 1875. It is found in eastern and southern North America.

The wingspan is 36–38 mm. Adults are on wing from May to August depending on the location.

Recorded food plants include ash, birch, chokecherry, elm, serviceberry, sour cherry, wild black cherry and willow.

== Subspecies ==
- Acronicta radcliffei radcliffei
- Acronicta radcliffei vancouverensis

== Life cycle ==
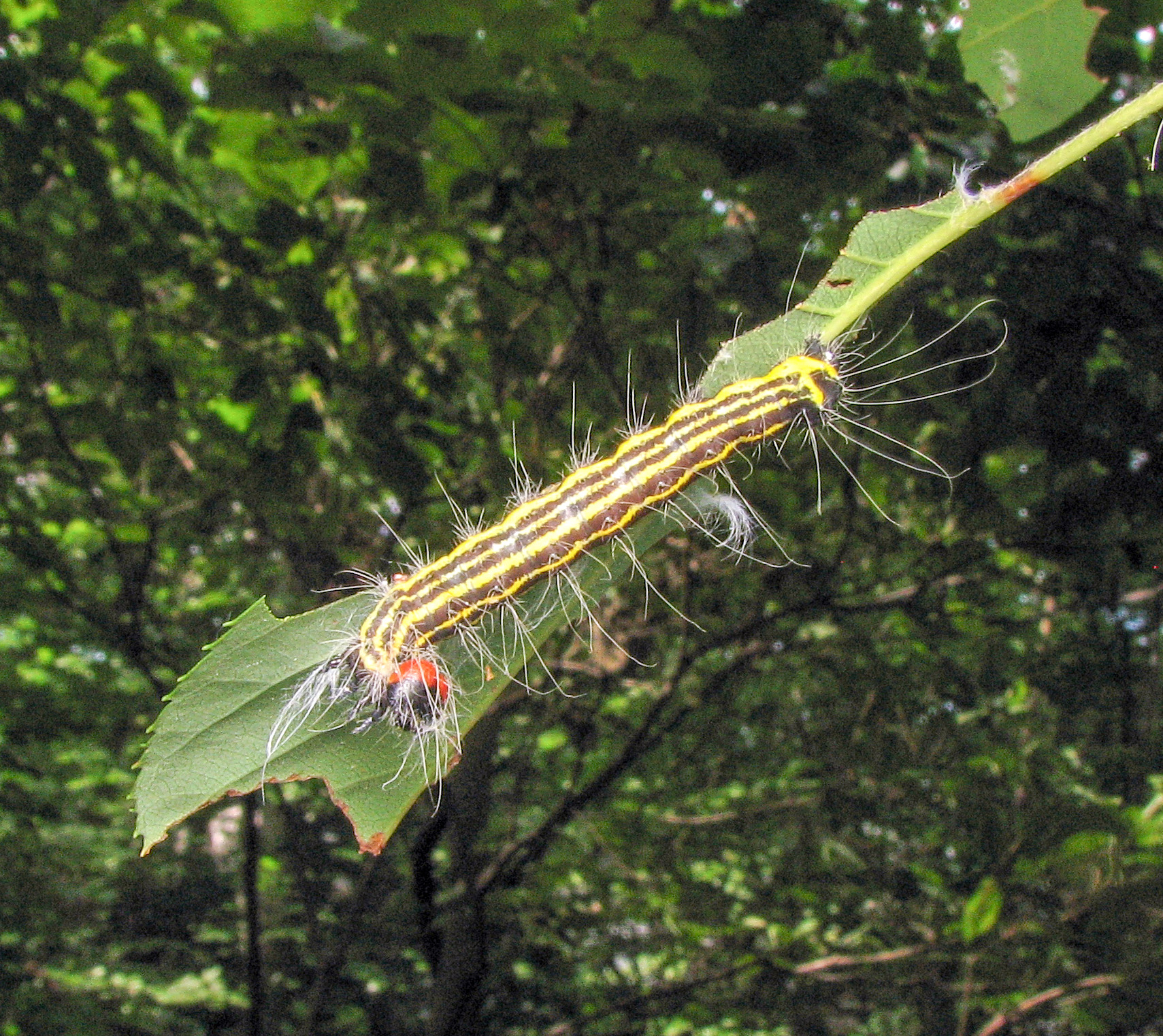
Caterpillar

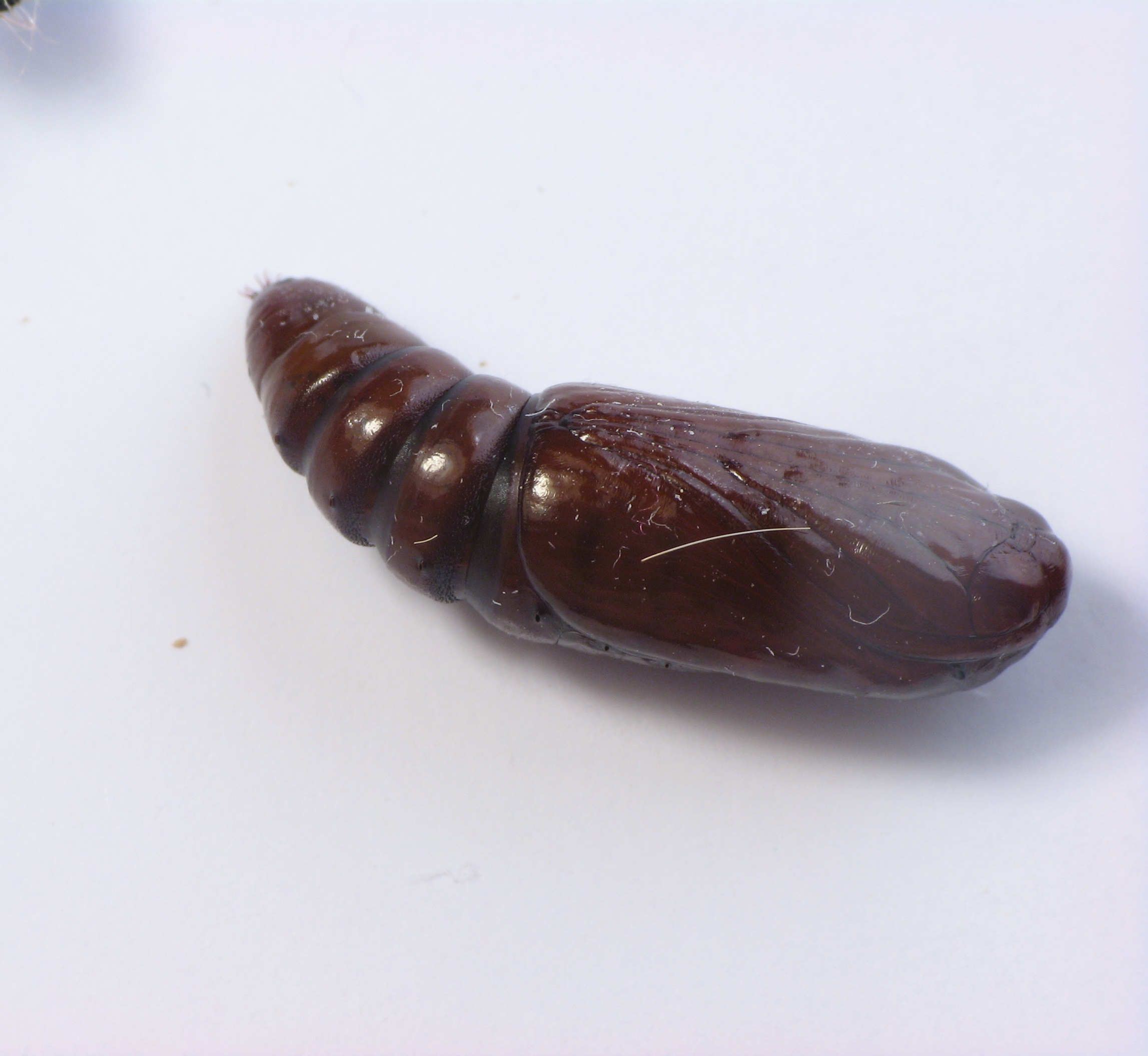
Pupa

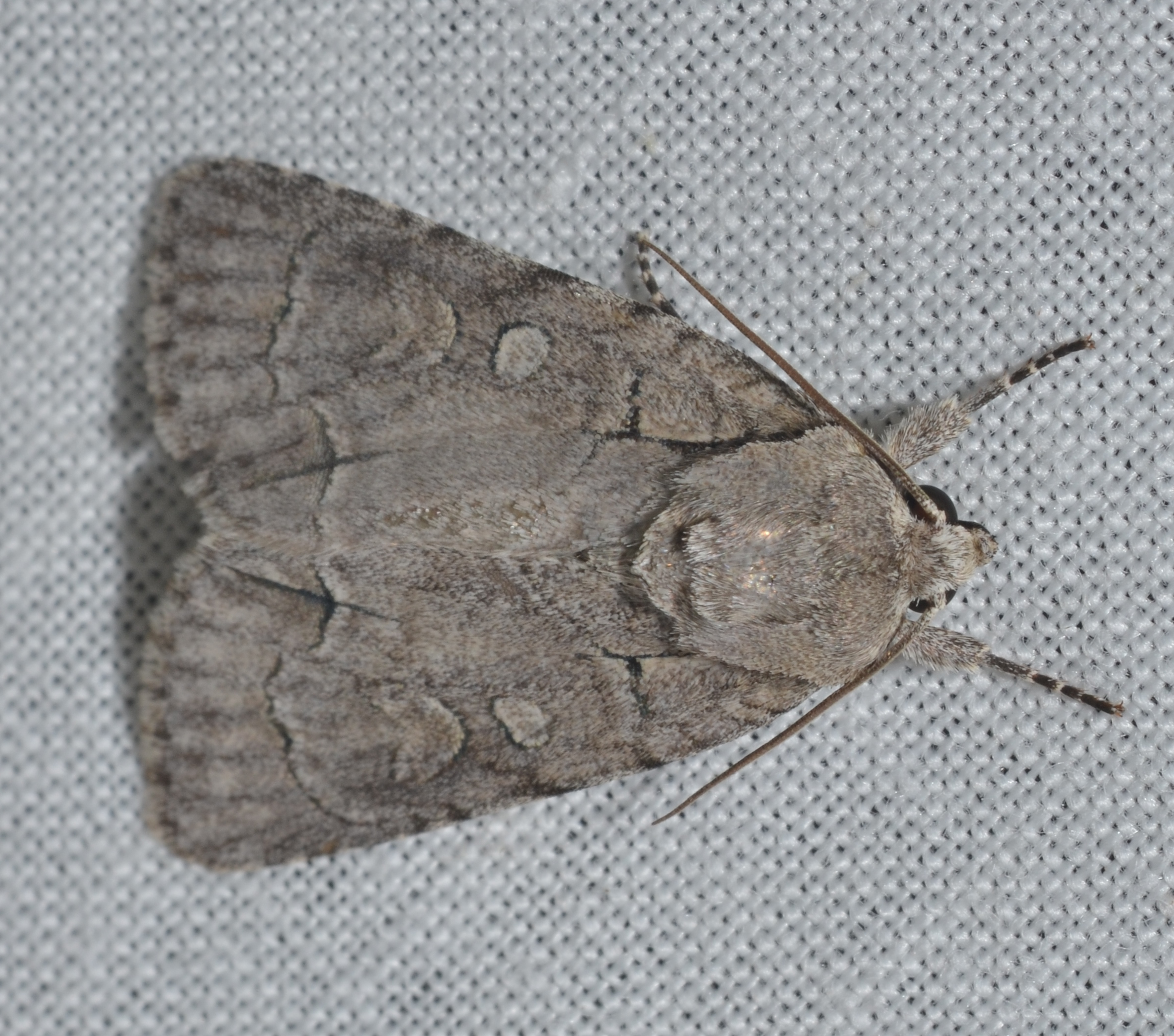
Adult
