= Boursinia =

Scientific classification
- Kingdom: Animalia
- Phylum: Arthropoda
- Class: Insecta
- Order: Lepidoptera
- Superfamily: Noctuoidea
- Family: Noctuidae
- Genus: Boursinia; Brandt, 1938

Synonyms
- Anamecia Boursin, 1958

Genus of moths

Boursinia is a genus of moths of the family Noctuidae. The genus was described by Wilhelm Brandt in 1938, and the genus name honours Charles Boursin, who worked extensively on the family Noctuidae.

== Species ==
- Boursinia candida (Boursin, 1964) Pakistan
- Boursinia deceptrix (Staudinger, 1900) Syria, Jordan, Arabia, Egypt
- Boursinia ferdovsi (Brandt, 1941) Iran, United Arab Emirates
- Boursinia malitiosa (Alphéraky, 1892) Kazakhstan
- Boursinia merideremica Hacker, 2004 Namibia
- Boursinia oxygramma Brandt, 1938 Iran
- Boursinia symmicta Brandt, 1938 Iran
