= Anycteola =

Scientific classification
- Domain: Eukaryota
- Kingdom: Animalia
- Phylum: Arthropoda
- Class: Insecta
- Order: Lepidoptera
- Superfamily: Noctuoidea
- Family: Noctuidae
- Subfamily: Oncocnemidinae
- Genus: Anycteola; Barnes & Benjamin, 1929
- Species: A. fotelloides

Binomial name
- Anycteola fotelloides (Barnes & McDunnough, 1916)

Genus of moths

Anycteola is a monotypic moth genus of the family Noctuidae erected by William Barnes and Foster Hendrickson Benjamin in 1929. Its only species, Anycteola fotelloides, was first described by Barnes and James Halliday McDunnough in 1916. It is found in the US state of Arizona.
