= Aucha =

Scientific classification
- Kingdom: Animalia
- Phylum: Arthropoda
- Class: Insecta
- Order: Lepidoptera
- Superfamily: Noctuoidea
- Family: Noctuidae
- Subfamily: Cobubathinae
- Genus: Aucha; Walker, 1858

Genus of moths

Aucha is a genus of moths of the family Noctuidae.

== Description ==
Its eyes are naked and without lashes. The proboscis is well developed. Palpi upturned and smoothly scaled, where the second joint reaching above vertex of head, and third joint short. Antennae simple. Thorax and abdomen without tufts and smoothly scaled. Tibia spineless. Forewings with non-crenulate cilia and hindwings produced at apex.

== Species ==
- Aucha melaleuca Berio, 1940
- Aucha polyphaenoides (Wiltshire, 1961)
- Aucha tenebricosa (Saalmüller, 1891)
- Aucha triphaenoides Walker, 1865
- Aucha velans Walker, [1858]
- Aucha vesta Swinhoe, 1901
