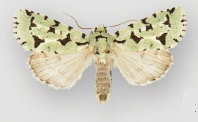
- Male
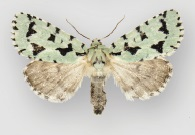
- Female

Conservation status
- Secure (NatureServe)

Scientific classification
- Kingdom: Animalia
- Phylum: Arthropoda
- Clade: Pancrustacea
- Class: Insecta
- Order: Lepidoptera
- Superfamily: Noctuoidea
- Family: Noctuidae
- Genus: Acronicta
- Species: A. fallax

Binomial name
- Acronicta fallax (Herrich-Schäffer, 1854)

Synonyms
- Moma fallax Herrich-Schäffer, 1854; Agriopodes fallax; Moma geminata Smith, 1903; Agriopodes geminata

= Acronicta fallax =

Species of moth

Acronicta fallax, the green marvel moth, is a moth of the family Noctuidae. The species was first described by Gottlieb August Wilhelm Herrich-Schäffer in 1854. It is found in most of North America, from Ontario, Quebec, New Brunswick, Nova Scotia, Newfoundland and Labrador and Manitoba south to Arizona and Florida.

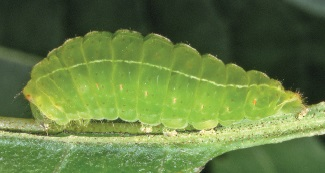
Larva

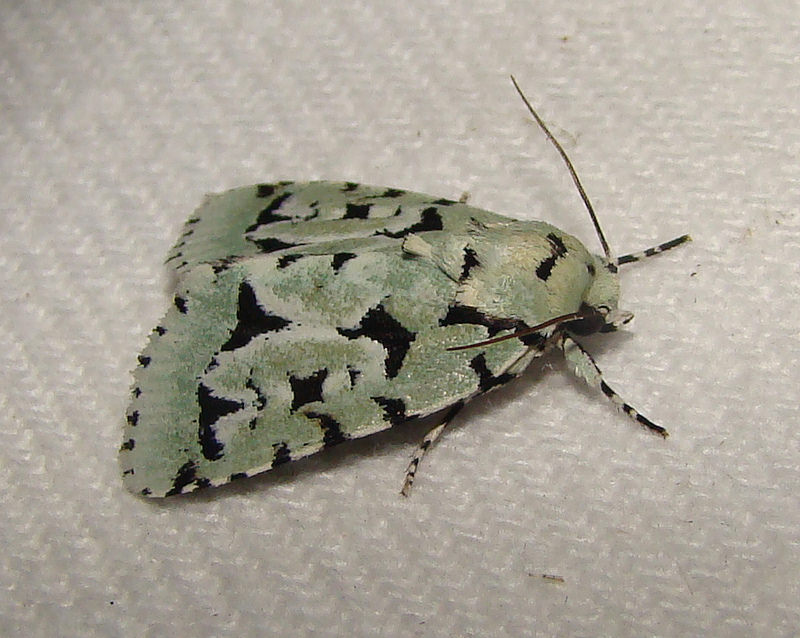

The wingspan is about 34 mm. Adults are on wing from February to November in Florida.
