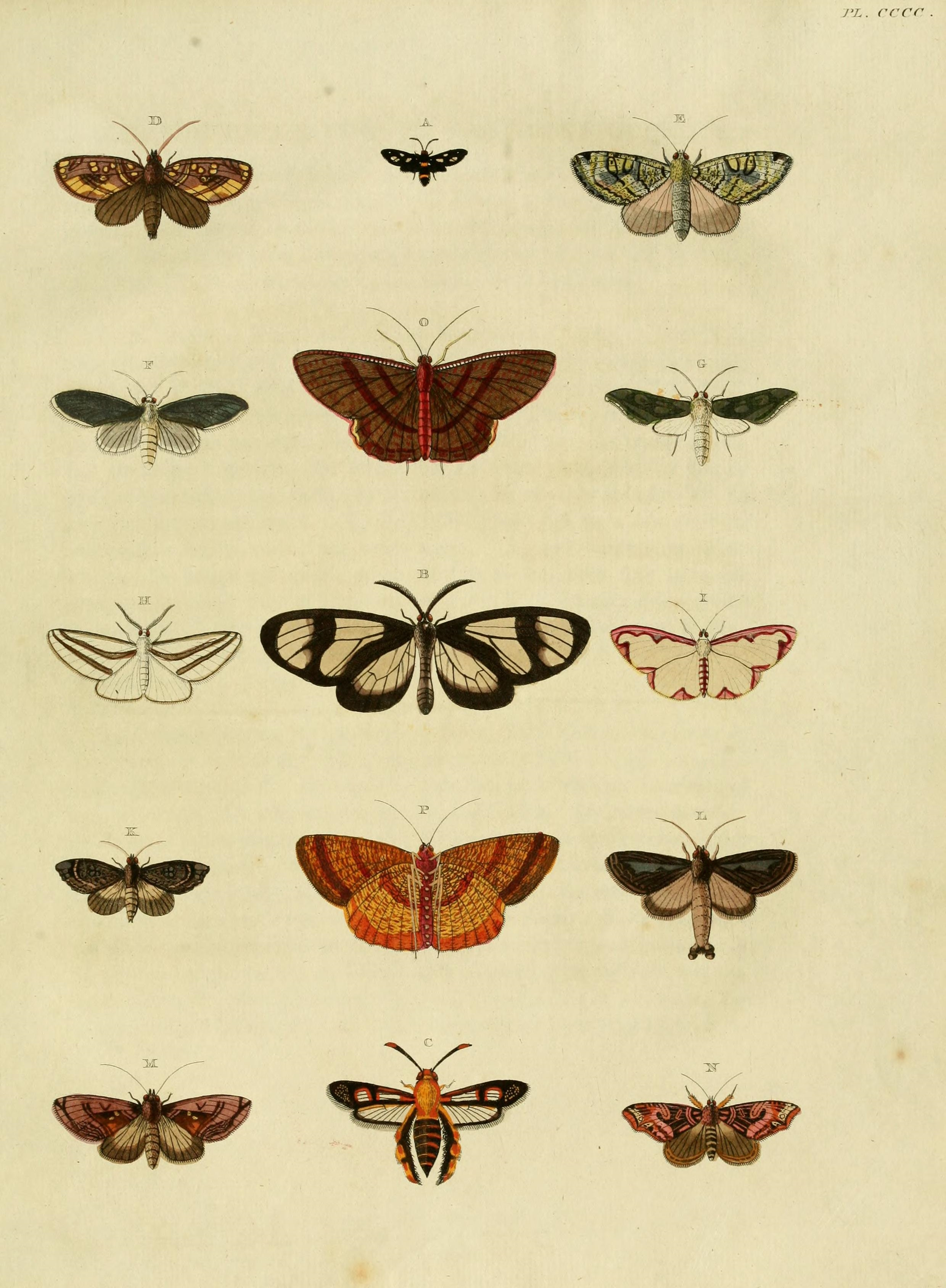

Scientific classification
- Kingdom: Animalia
- Phylum: Arthropoda
- Clade: Pancrustacea
- Class: Insecta
- Order: Lepidoptera
- Superfamily: Noctuoidea
- Family: Noctuidae
- Subfamily: Acronictinae
- Genus: Argyrosticta; Hübner, [1821]

Synonyms
- Thyria Guenée, 1852

= Argyrosticta =

Genus of moths

Argyrosticta is a genus of moths of the family Noctuidae. The genus was erected by Jacob Hübner in 1821.

== Selected species ==
- Argyrosticta amoenita (Stoll, [1780]) Panama, Suriname
- Argyrosticta aurifundens (Walker, 1858) Mexico, Panama, Brazil (Rio de Janeiro, Rio Grand do Sul)
- Argyrosticta bellinita (Guenée, 1852) Panama, Brazil (Pernambuco)
- Argyrosticta decumana (Felder & Rogenhofer, 1874) Brazil (São Paulo, Paraña)
- Argyrosticta ditissima (Walker, [1858]) Honduras, Trinidad, French Guiana, Brazil (Amazonas, Para, Parana), Colombia, Ecuador, Bolivia, Paraguay
- Argyrosticta eubotes (H. Druce, 1903) Colombia, Brazil (Rio Grande do Sul)
- Argyrosticta eurysaces (Schaus, 1914)
- Argyrosticta meres (H. Druce, 1903) Colombia, Ecuador, British Guiana, Brazil (Parana)
- Argyrosticta panamensis (H. Druce, 1889) Panama
- Argyrosticta phraortes (H. Druce, 1903) Peru, Brazil (Rio Grande do Sul)
- Argyrosticta scione (H. Druce, 1903) Colombia
- Argyrosticta vauaurea (Hampson, 1908) Trinidad, Guyana
- Argyrosticta venatrix (Stoll, [1782]) Suriname
