= Atypha =

Scientific classification
- Kingdom: Animalia
- Phylum: Arthropoda
- Clade: Pancrustacea
- Class: Insecta
- Order: Lepidoptera
- Superfamily: Noctuoidea
- Family: Noctuidae
- Subfamily: Xyleninae
- Genus: Atypha; Hübner, [1821]
- Species: A. pulmonaris

Binomial name
- Atypha pulmonaris (Esper, 1790)

Synonyms
- Generic: Paratypha Koçak, 1980; Specific: Phalaena (Noctua) pulmonaris Esper, 1790; Phalaena (Noctua) pulmonaris Esper, 1804; Phalaena (Noctua) fuscago Esper, 1791; Phalaena (Noctua) fuscago Esper, 1805; Noctua pulmonariae Hübner, [1803]; Atypha pulmonaris promethea Boursin, 1943; Atypha miljanovskii Schintlmeister & Poltawski, 1986

Genus of moths

Atypha is a monotypic genus of moth in the family Noctuidae erected by Jacob Hübner in 1821. Its only species, Atypha pulmonaris, was first described by Eugenius Johann Christoph Esper in 1790. It is found in southern and central Europe, northern Turkey, Transcaucasia and the Caucasus.
