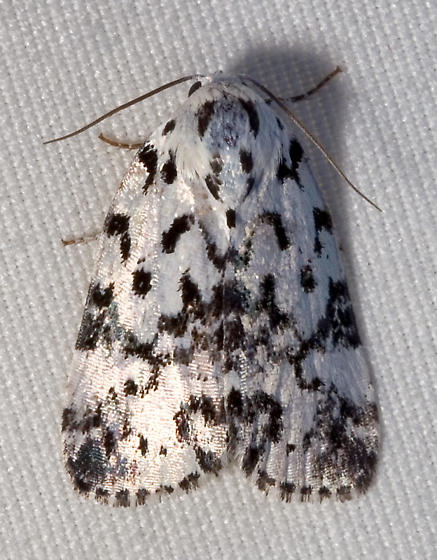

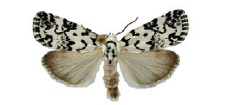

Scientific classification
- Kingdom: Animalia
- Phylum: Arthropoda
- Clade: Pancrustacea
- Class: Insecta
- Order: Lepidoptera
- Superfamily: Noctuoidea
- Family: Noctuidae
- Genus: Polygrammate; Hübner, 1818
- Species: P. hebraeicum

Binomial name
- Polygrammate hebraeicum Hübner, 1818

Synonyms
- Generic: Diphthera Hübner, 1809; Grammophora Guenée, 1852; Specific: Polygrammate hebraea Guenée, 1852 (missp.)

= Polygrammate =

Genus of moths

Polygrammate is a monotypic genus of moths in the family Noctuidae. Its only species, Polygrammate hebraeicum, the Hebrew moth or Hebrew, is found in the eastern parts of North America, from Ontario, south to Florida and as far west as Texas. Both the genus and the species were first described by Jacob Hübner in 1818.

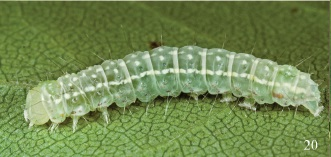
Polygrammate hebraeicum larvae

The wingspan is 23–39 mm. Adults are on wing from May to August.

The larvae feed on black gum trees.
