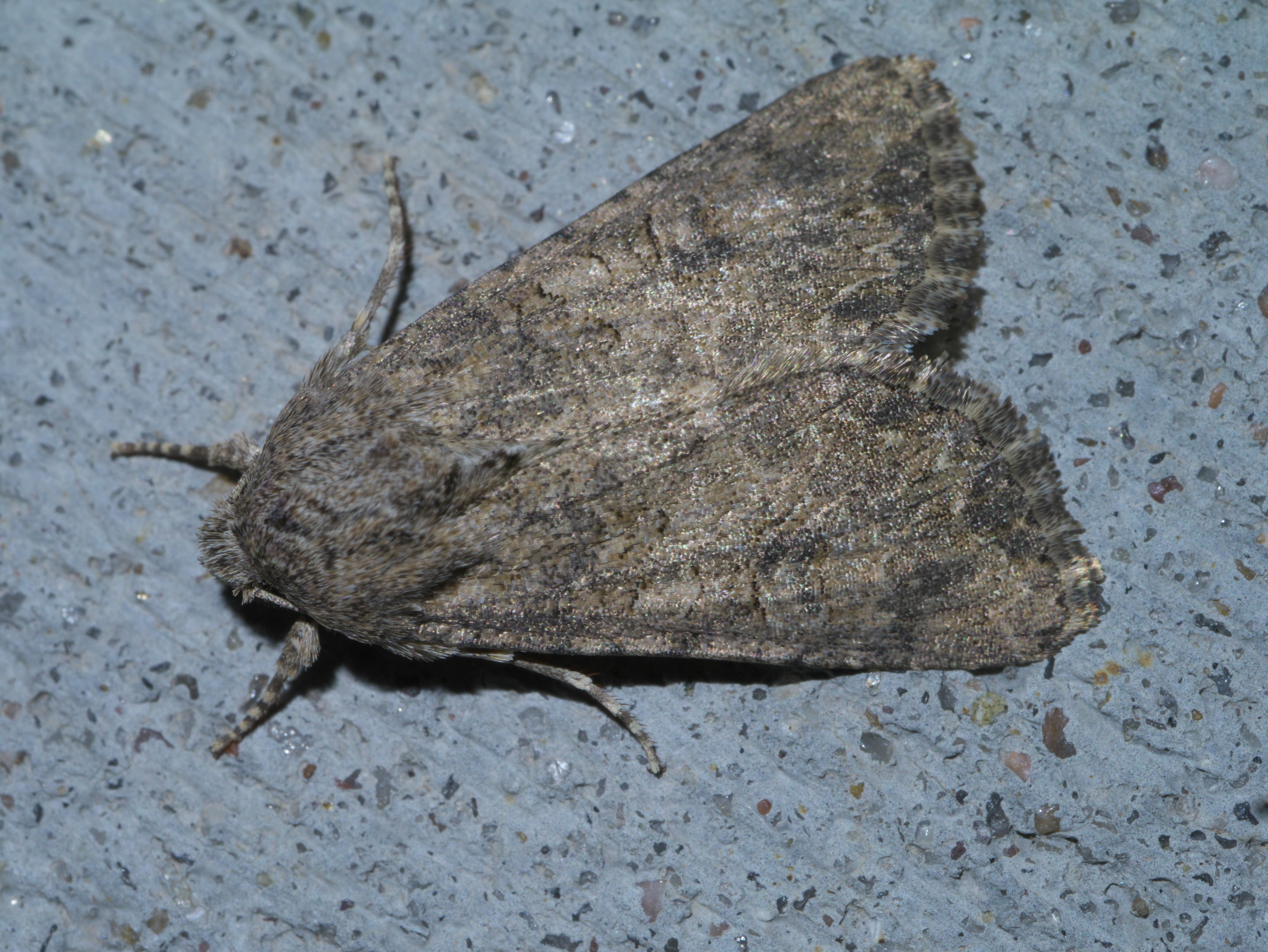
- Psaphida

Scientific classification
- Kingdom: Animalia
- Phylum: Arthropoda
- Class: Insecta
- Order: Lepidoptera
- Superfamily: Noctuoidea
- Family: Noctuidae
- Subfamily: Amphipyrinae; Guenée, 1837

Tribes
- Amphipyrini Guenée, 1837; Psaphidini Grote, 1896

= Amphipyrinae =

Subfamily of moths

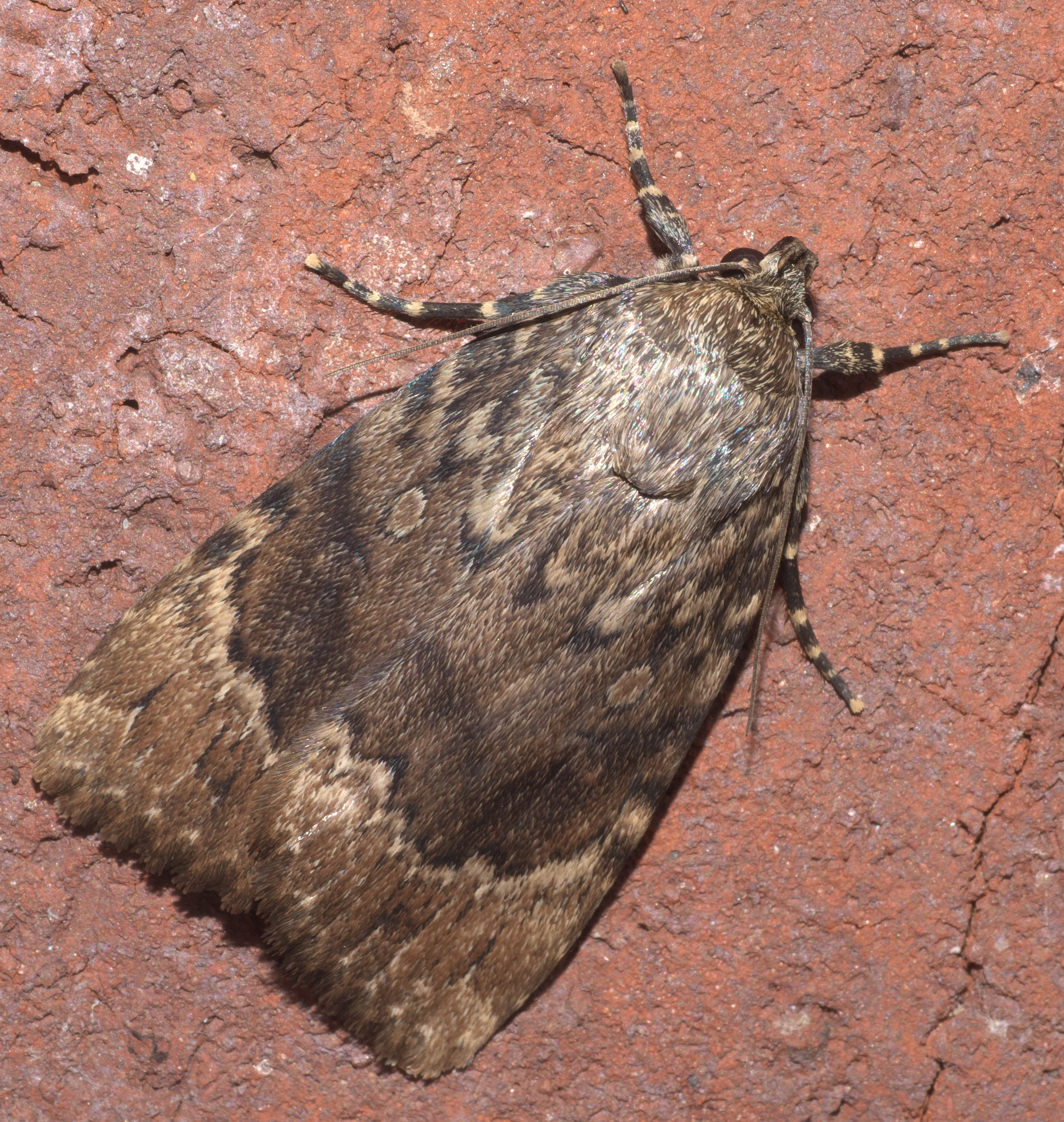
Amphipyra pyramidoides, Copper underwing, Oklahoma

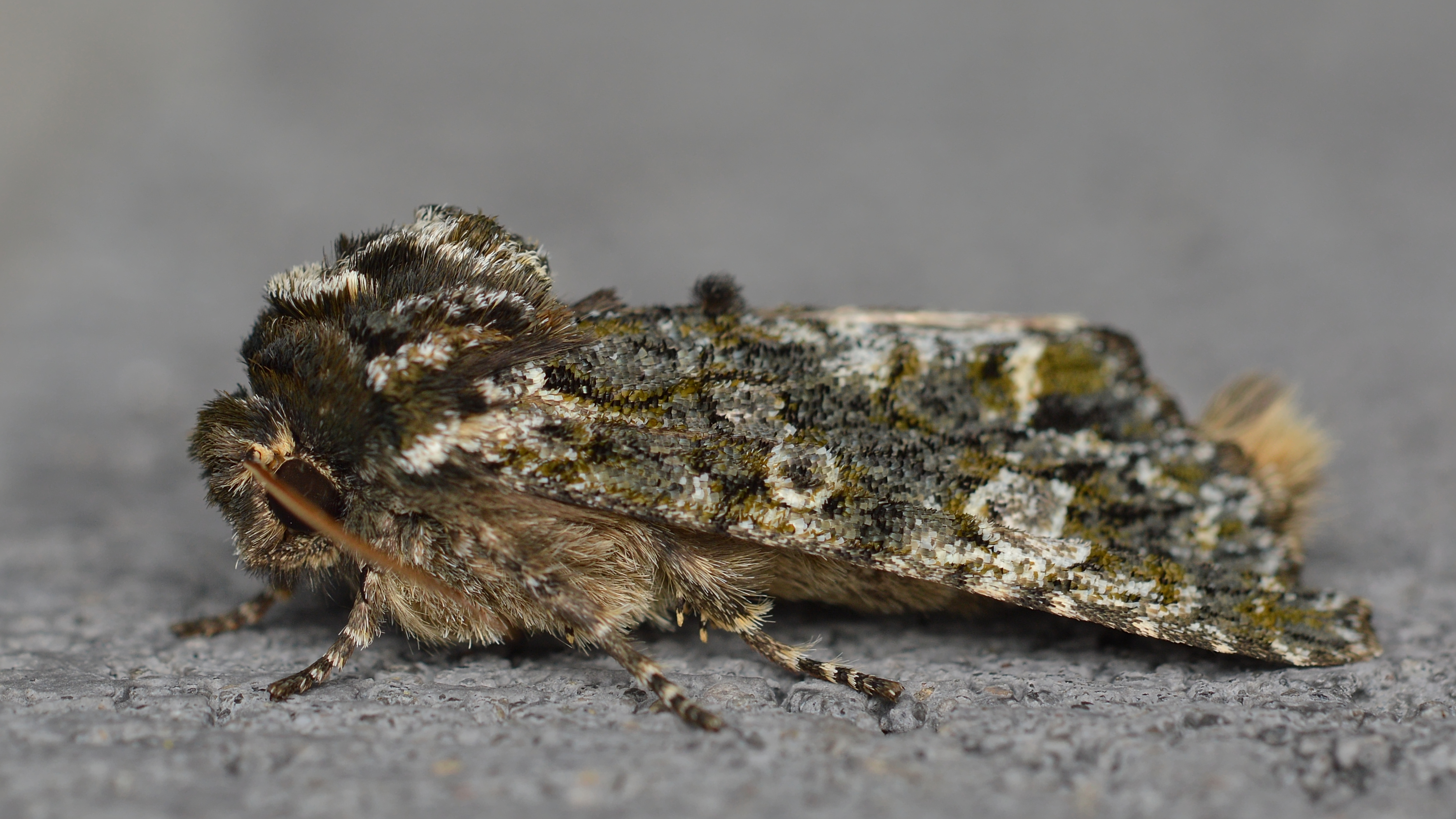
Copivaleria grotei, Grote's Sallow, Ontario, Canada

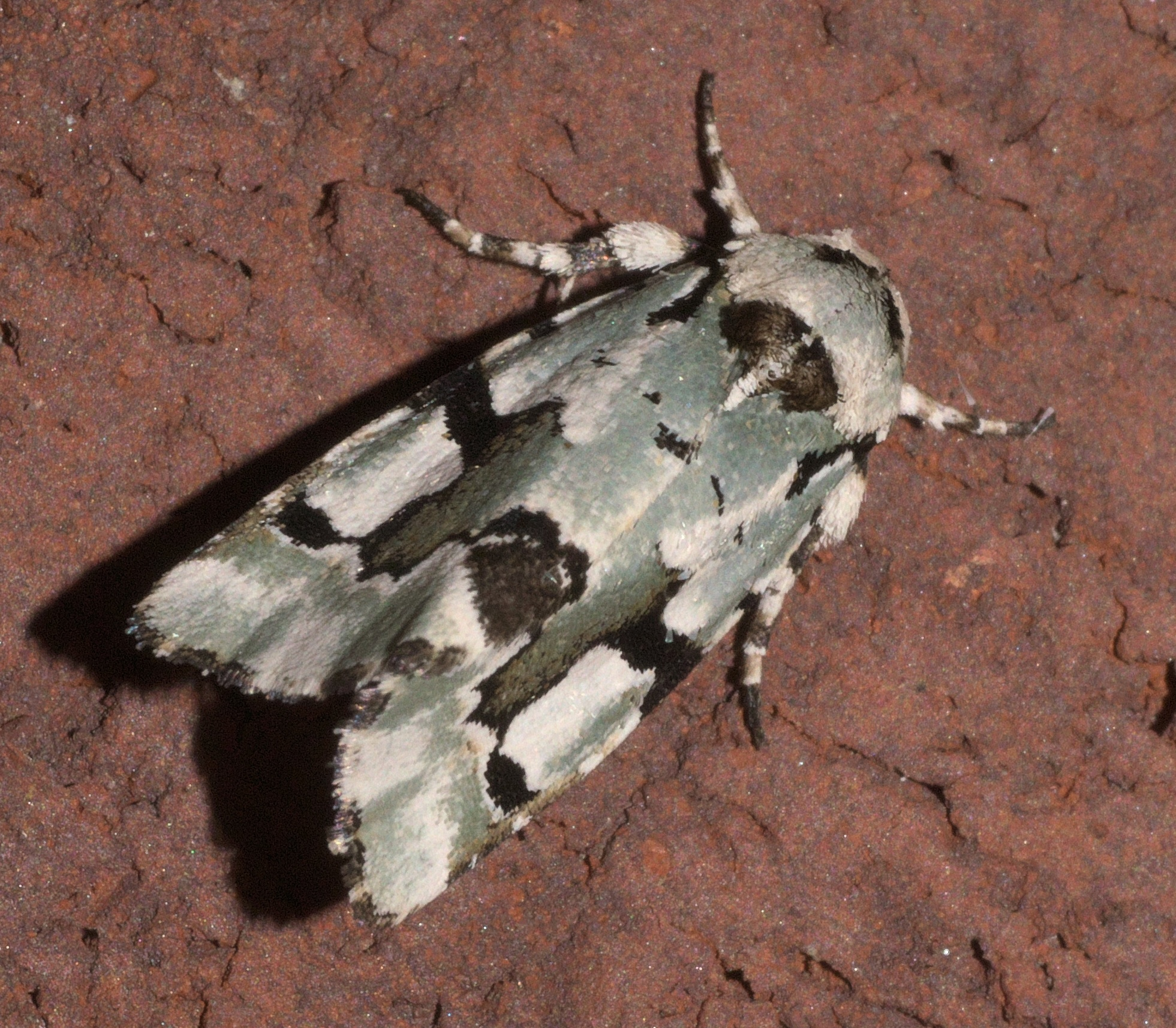
Emarginea percara, Beloved emarginea, Oklahoma

Amphipyrinae is a subfamily of owlet moths in the family Noctuidae. There are more than 50 genera and 210 described species in Amphipyrinae, although the classifications are likely to change over time.

This subfamily has been used as a catchall for members of Noctuidae that don't fit well into other subfamilies. As such, many of its members lack morphological traits that would allow assignment into one of the other subfamilies. Genetic analysis conducted on Amphipyrinae is improving the classification of these genera.

In 2021, phylogenetic research resulted in 11 genera being transferred from Amphipyrinae to six different subfamilies, and it is expected that more members of Amphipyrinae will be reassigned as further research is done.

Psaphidini is included here as a tribe, but is sometimes treated as the subfamily Psaphidinae. The Australian genera in Acronictinae are sometimes considered part of Amphipyrinae.

== Genera ==
These 52 genera belong to the subfamily Amphipyrinae:

Tribe Amphipyrini Guenée, 1837

Amphipyra Ochsenheimer, 1816

Tribe Psaphidini Grote, 1896

Subtribe Feraliina Poole, 1995

Apsaphida Franclemont, 1973
Feralia Grote, 1874
Miracavira Franclemont, 1937
Paratrachea Hampson, 1908
Viridemas Smith, 1908

Subtribe Nocloina Poole, 1995

Emarginea Guenée, 1852
Euamiana Barnes & Benjamin, 1927
Lythrodes Smith, 1903
Nocloa Smith, 1906
Oslaria Dyar, 1904
Paramiana Barnes & Benjamin, 1924
Petalumaria Buckett & Bauer, 1968
Prothrinax Hampson, 1908
Redingtonia Barnes & McDunnough, 1912
Ruacodes Hampson, 1908
Walterella Dyar, 1921

Subtribe Psaphidina Grote, 1896

Brachionycha Hübner, 1819
Copivaleria Grote, 1883
Pleromella Dyar, 1921
Provia Barnes & McDunnough, 1910
Psaphida Walker, 1865
Pseudocopivaleria Buckett & Bauer, 1966

Subtribe Triocnemidina Poole, 1995

Crimona Smith, 1902
Oxycnemis Grote, 1882
Policocnemis Benjamin, 1932
Triocnemis Grote, 1881
Unciella Troubridge, 2008

Not assigned to a subtribe
Allomeganephria Ronkay, Ronkay, Gyulai & Hacker, 2010
Asteroscopus Boisduval, 1828
Benedekia Ronkay, Ronkay, Gyulai & Hacker, 2010
Beshkovietta Ronkay, Ronkay, Gyulai & Hacker, 2010
Copitype Hampson, 1906
Diphtherocome Warren, 1907
Fansipania Ronkay, Ronkay, Gyulai & Hacker, 2010
Flexivaleria
Gracilisinensis Gyulai, Saldaitis & Vaitonis, 2017
Himalaea Hreblay & Ronkay, 1998
Sirioba Nye, 1975
Speidelia Ronkay, 2000
Valeria Stephens, 1829
Vigentinocome

Not assigned to a tribe
Bityla Walker, 1865
Centrogone Hampson, 1908
Eutamsia Fletcher D.S., 1961
Exathetis Janse, 1938
Heptapotamia Alphéraky, 1882
Leucosigma Druce, 1908
Mazuca Walker, 1866
Nacna Fletcher, 1961
Phidrimana Kononenko, 1989
Thoracolopha Turner, 1939
