= Paramiana marina =

Scientific classification
- Domain: Eukaryota
- Kingdom: Animalia
- Phylum: Arthropoda
- Class: Insecta
- Order: Lepidoptera
- Superfamily: Noctuoidea
- Family: Noctuidae
- Tribe: Psaphidini
- Subtribe: Nocloina
- Genus: Paramiana
- Species: P. marina

Binomial name
- Paramiana marina (Smith, 1906)

Species of moth

Paramiana marina is a species of moth in the family Noctuidae (the owlet moths). It is found in North America.

The MONA or Hodges number for Paramiana marina is 9804.
