= Prothrinax luteomedia =

Scientific classification
- Domain: Eukaryota
- Kingdom: Animalia
- Phylum: Arthropoda
- Class: Insecta
- Order: Lepidoptera
- Superfamily: Noctuoidea
- Family: Noctuidae
- Tribe: Psaphidini
- Subtribe: Nocloina
- Genus: Prothrinax
- Species: P. luteomedia

Binomial name
- Prothrinax luteomedia (Smith, 1907)

Species of moth

Prothrinax luteomedia is a species of moth in the family Noctuidae (the owlet moths). It is found in North America.

The MONA or Hodges number for Prothrinax luteomedia is 9829.
