= Paramiana perissa =

Scientific classification
- Domain: Eukaryota
- Kingdom: Animalia
- Phylum: Arthropoda
- Class: Insecta
- Order: Lepidoptera
- Superfamily: Noctuoidea
- Family: Noctuidae
- Tribe: Psaphidini
- Subtribe: Nocloina
- Genus: Paramiana
- Species: P. perissa

Binomial name
- Paramiana perissa Nye, 1975

Species of moth

Paramiana perissa is a species of moth in the family Noctuidae (the owlet moths). It is found in North America.

The MONA or Hodges number for Paramiana perissa is 9805.
