= Pseudocopivaleria anaverta =

Scientific classification
- Domain: Eukaryota
- Kingdom: Animalia
- Phylum: Arthropoda
- Class: Insecta
- Order: Lepidoptera
- Superfamily: Noctuoidea
- Family: Noctuidae
- Tribe: Psaphidini
- Subtribe: Psaphidina
- Genus: Pseudocopivaleria
- Species: P. anaverta

Binomial name
- Pseudocopivaleria anaverta Buckett & Bauer, 1966

Species of moth

Pseudocopivaleria anaverta is a species of moth in the family Noctuidae (the owlet moths). It is found in North America.

The MONA or Hodges number for Pseudocopivaleria anaverta is 10018.
