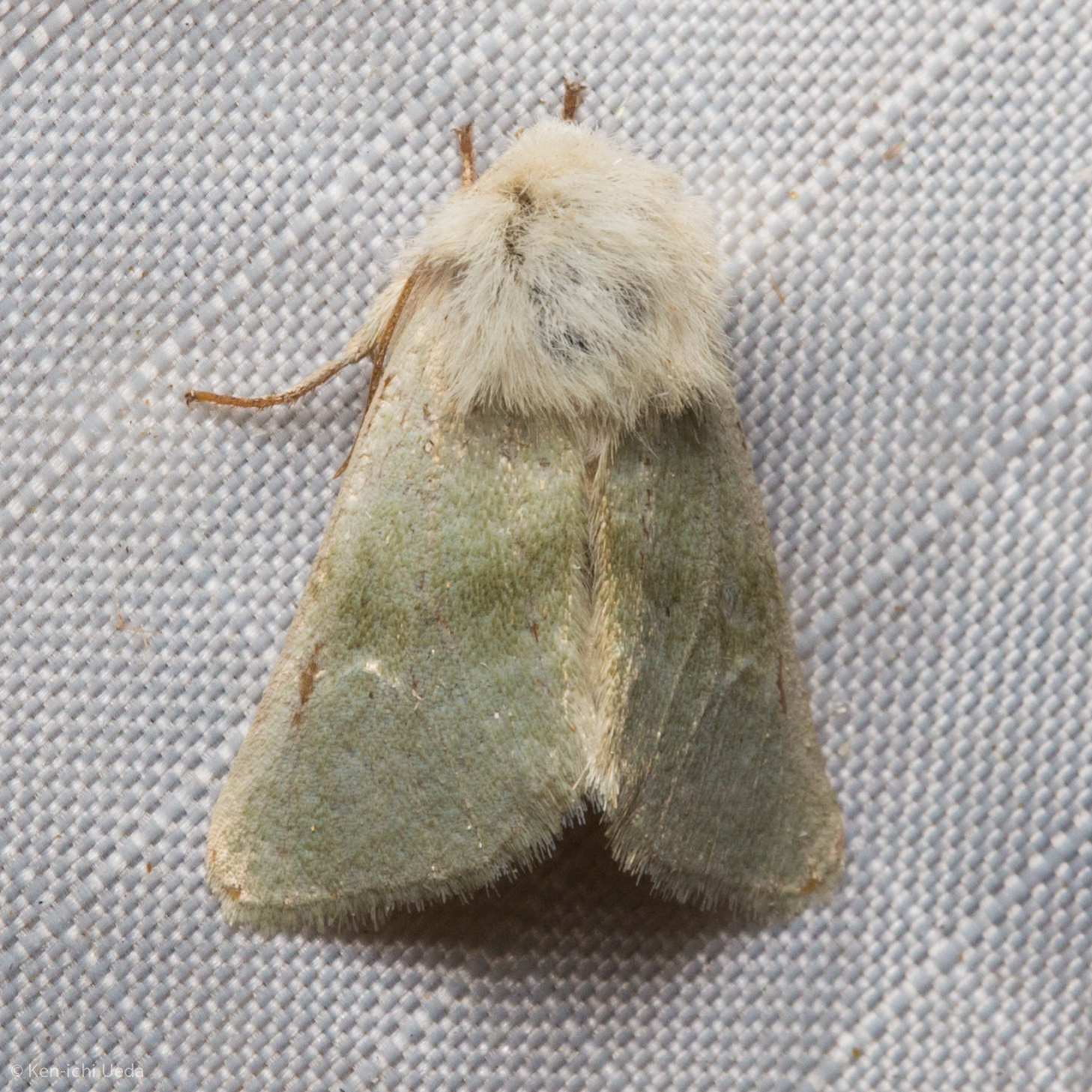

Scientific classification
- Domain: Eukaryota
- Kingdom: Animalia
- Phylum: Arthropoda
- Class: Insecta
- Order: Lepidoptera
- Superfamily: Noctuoidea
- Family: Noctuidae
- Tribe: Psaphidini
- Subtribe: Nocloina
- Genus: Nocloa
- Species: N. pallens

Binomial name
- Nocloa pallens (Tepper, 1882)

= Nocloa pallens =

Species of moth

Nocloa pallens is a species of moth in the family Noctuidae (the owlet moths). It is found in North America.
