= Nocloa nanata =

Scientific classification
- Domain: Eukaryota
- Kingdom: Animalia
- Phylum: Arthropoda
- Class: Insecta
- Order: Lepidoptera
- Superfamily: Noctuoidea
- Family: Noctuidae
- Tribe: Psaphidini
- Subtribe: Nocloina
- Genus: Nocloa
- Species: N. nanata

Binomial name
- Nocloa nanata (Neumögen, 1884)

Species of moth

Nocloa nanata is a species of moth in the family Noctuidae (the owlet moths). It is found in North America.

The MONA or Hodges number for Nocloa nanata is 9797.
