= Pachythrix =

Scientific classification
- Domain: Eukaryota
- Kingdom: Animalia
- Phylum: Arthropoda
- Class: Insecta
- Order: Lepidoptera
- Superfamily: Noctuoidea
- Family: Noctuidae
- Subfamily: Amphipyrinae
- Genus: Pachythrix; Turner, 1942

Genus of moths

Pachythrix is a genus of moths of the family Noctuidae.

== Species ==
- Pachythrix axia (Turner, 1941)
- Pachythrix chlorophylla (Zilli, 2020)
- Pachythrix esmeralda (Warren, 1912)
- Pachythrix hampsoni (Nye, 1975)
- Pachythrix mniochlora (Meyrick, 1889)
- Pachythrix smaragdistis (Hampson, 1908)
