= Nocloa duplicatus =

Scientific classification
- Domain: Eukaryota
- Kingdom: Animalia
- Phylum: Arthropoda
- Class: Insecta
- Order: Lepidoptera
- Superfamily: Noctuoidea
- Family: Noctuidae
- Tribe: Psaphidini
- Subtribe: Nocloina
- Genus: Nocloa
- Species: N. duplicatus

Binomial name
- Nocloa duplicatus (Smith, 1891)

Species of moth

Nocloa duplicatus is a species of moth in the family Noctuidae (the owlet moths).

The MONA or Hodges number for Nocloa duplicatus is 9801.
