= Euamiana adusta =

Scientific classification
- Domain: Eukaryota
- Kingdom: Animalia
- Phylum: Arthropoda
- Class: Insecta
- Order: Lepidoptera
- Superfamily: Noctuoidea
- Family: Noctuidae
- Tribe: Psaphidini
- Subtribe: Nocloina
- Genus: Euamiana
- Species: E. adusta

Binomial name
- Euamiana adusta A. Blanchard & Knudson, 1986

Species of moth

Euamiana adusta is a species of moth in the family Noctuidae (the owlet moths). It is found in North America.

The MONA or Hodges number for Euamiana adusta is 9807.1.
