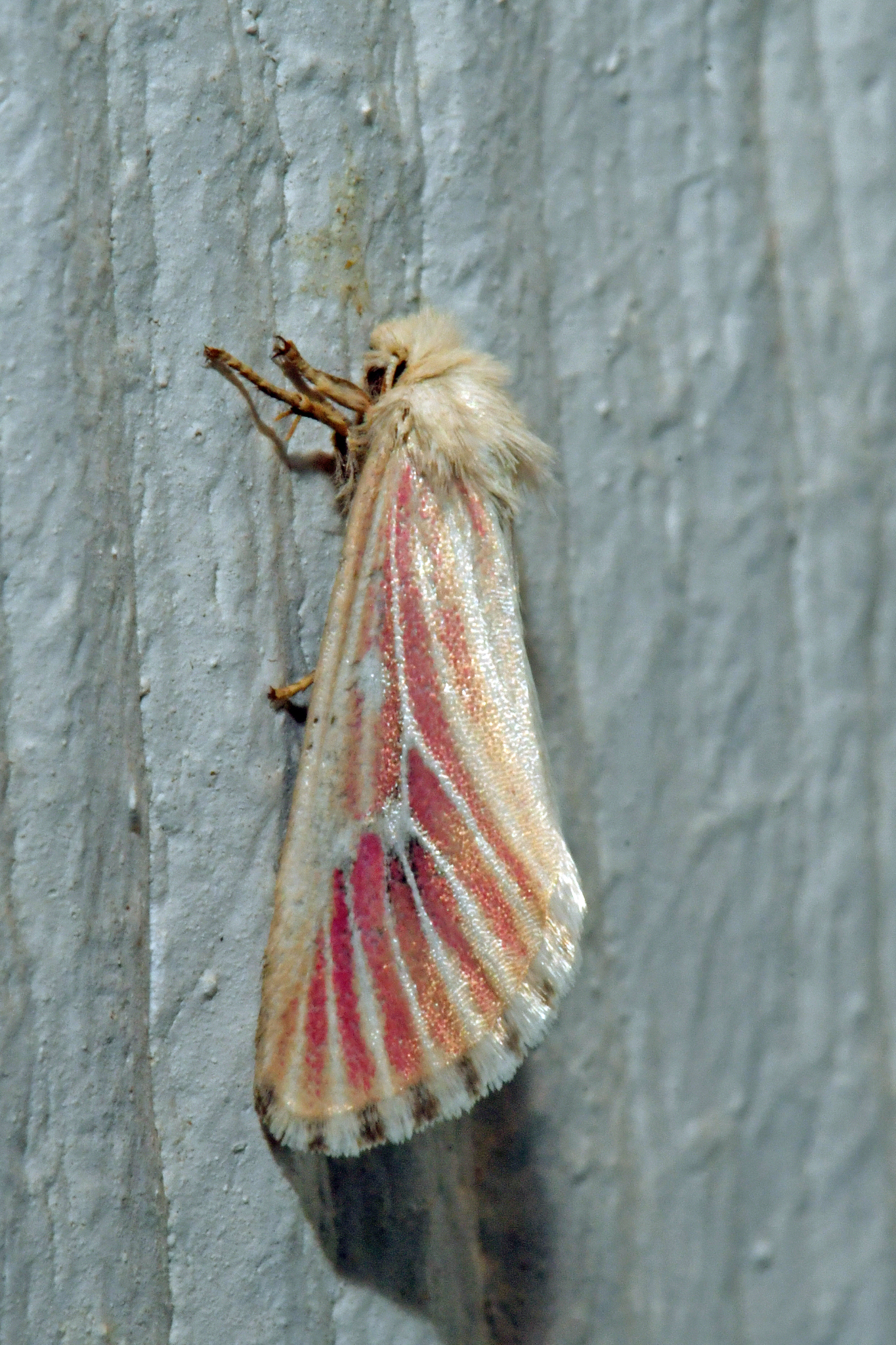

Scientific classification
- Kingdom: Animalia
- Phylum: Arthropoda
- Class: Insecta
- Order: Lepidoptera
- Superfamily: Noctuoidea
- Family: Noctuidae
- Tribe: Psaphidini
- Subtribe: Nocloina
- Genus: Lythrodes
- Species: L. venatus

Binomial name
- Lythrodes venatus Smith, 1903

= Lythrodes venatus =

Species of moth

Lythrodes venatus is a species of moth in the owlet moth family Noctuidae. It is found in North America.
