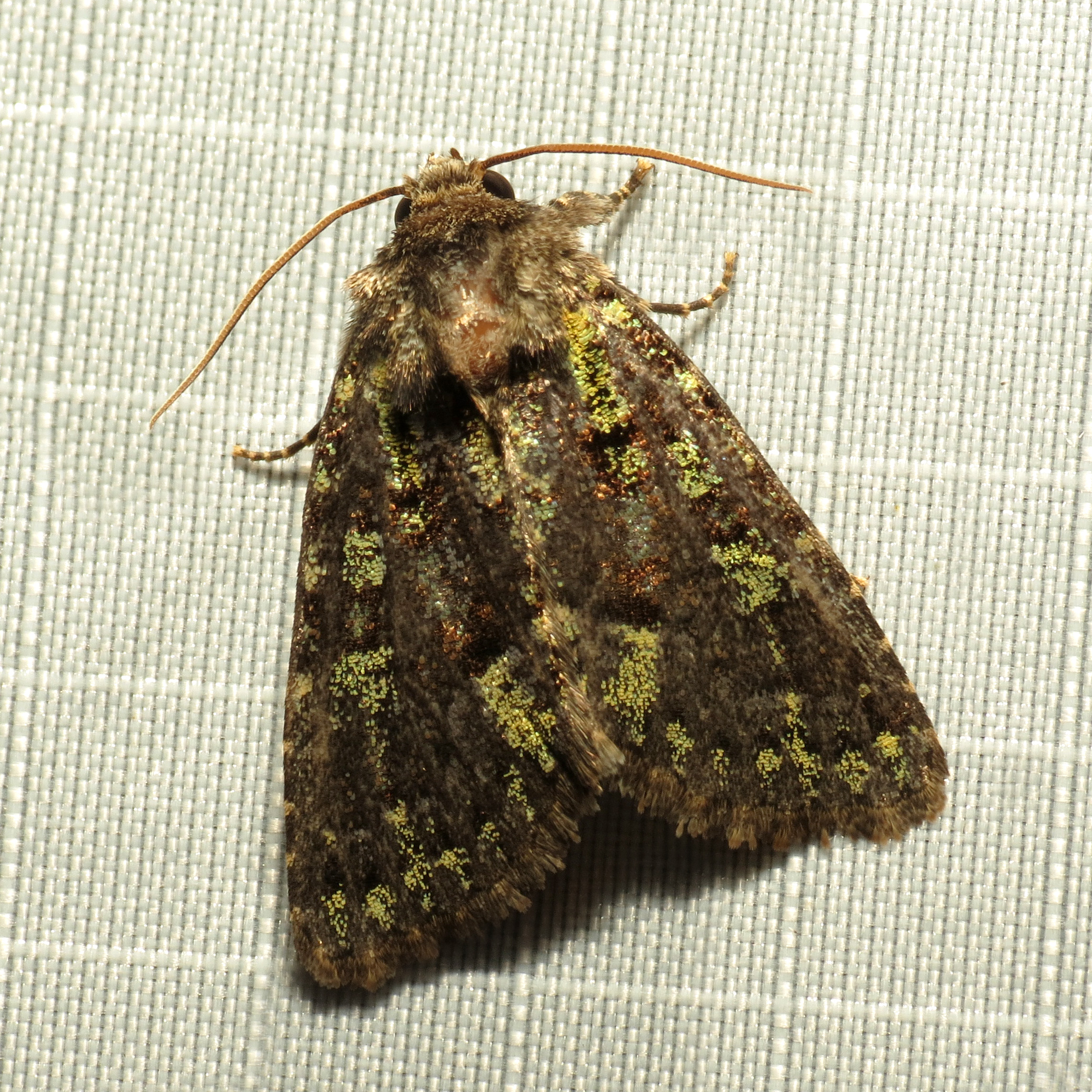

Scientific classification
- Kingdom: Animalia
- Phylum: Arthropoda
- Class: Insecta
- Order: Lepidoptera
- Superfamily: Noctuoidea
- Family: Noctuidae
- Tribe: Psaphidini
- Subtribe: Nocloina
- Genus: Paramiana
- Species: P. smaragdina

Binomial name
- Paramiana smaragdina (Neumögen, 1884)

= Paramiana smaragdina =

Species of moth

Paramiana smaragdina is a species of moth in the family Noctuidae (the owlet moths). It is found in North America.

The MONA or Hodges number for Paramiana smaragdina is 9803.

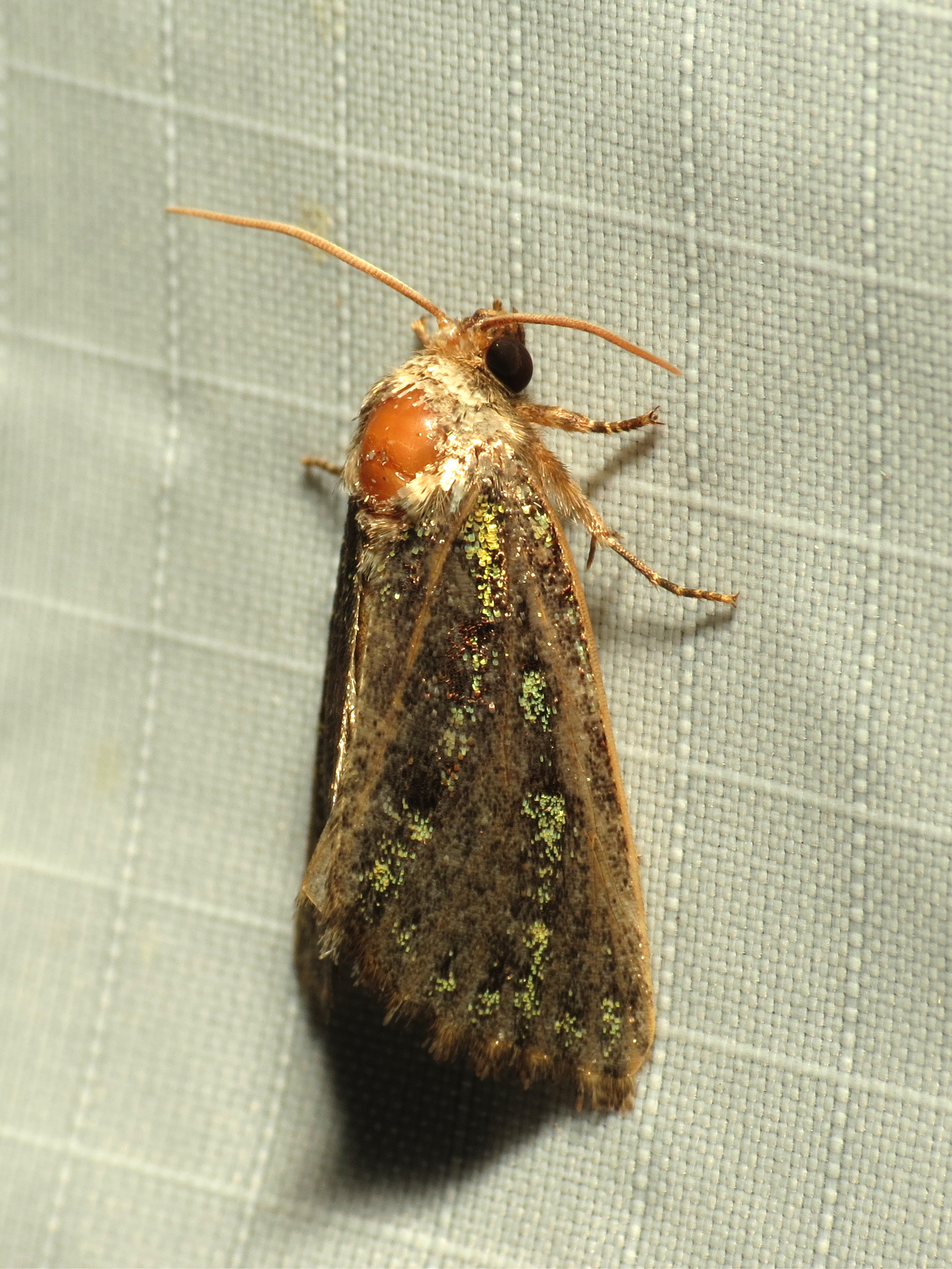
