= Unciella flagrantis =

Scientific classification
- Kingdom: Animalia
- Phylum: Arthropoda
- Class: Insecta
- Order: Lepidoptera
- Superfamily: Noctuoidea
- Family: Noctuidae
- Tribe: Psaphidini
- Subtribe: Triocnemidina
- Genus: Unciella
- Species: U. flagrantis

Binomial name
- Unciella flagrantis (Smith, 1893)

Species of moth

Unciella flagrantis is a species of moth in the family Noctuidae (the owlet moths). It is found in North America.

The MONA or Hodges number for Unciella flagrantis is 10112.
