= Nocloa rivulosa =

Scientific classification
- Domain: Eukaryota
- Kingdom: Animalia
- Phylum: Arthropoda
- Class: Insecta
- Order: Lepidoptera
- Superfamily: Noctuoidea
- Family: Noctuidae
- Tribe: Psaphidini
- Subtribe: Nocloina
- Genus: Nocloa
- Species: N. rivulosa

Binomial name
- Nocloa rivulosa Smith, 1906

Species of moth

Nocloa rivulosa is a species of moth in the family Noctuidae (the owlet moths). It is found in North America.

The MONA or Hodges number for Nocloa rivulosa is 9794.
