= Cropia connecta =

Scientific classification
- Domain: Eukaryota
- Kingdom: Animalia
- Phylum: Arthropoda
- Class: Insecta
- Order: Lepidoptera
- Superfamily: Noctuoidea
- Family: Noctuidae
- Subfamily: Cropiinae
- Genus: Cropia
- Species: C. connecta

Binomial name
- Cropia connecta (Smith, 1894)

Species of moth

Cropia connecta is a species of moth in the family Noctuidae (the owlet moths). It is found in North America.

The MONA or Hodges number for Cropia connecta is 9622.
