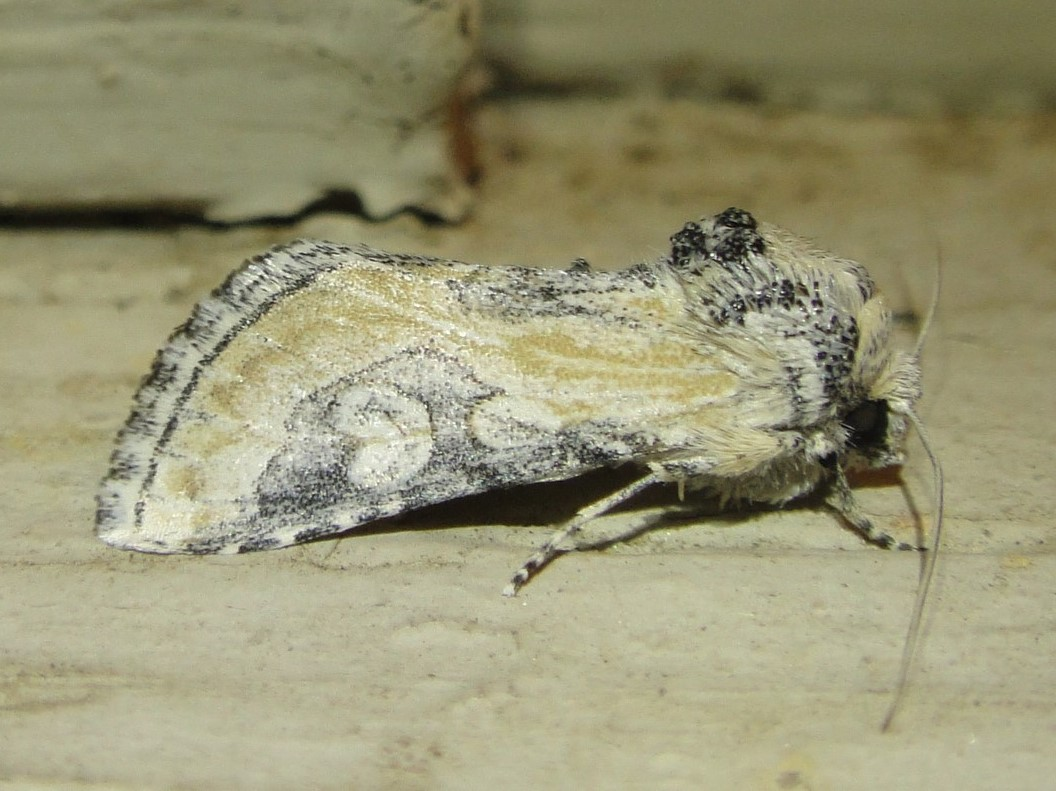

Scientific classification
- Domain: Eukaryota
- Kingdom: Animalia
- Phylum: Arthropoda
- Class: Insecta
- Order: Lepidoptera
- Superfamily: Noctuoidea
- Family: Noctuidae
- Genus: Crimona
- Species: C. pallimedia

Binomial name
- Crimona pallimedia Smith, 1902

= Crimona pallimedia =

Species of moth

Crimona pallimedia is a species of moth in the family Noctuidae (the owlet moths). It is found in North America.
