= Euamiana dissimilis =

Scientific classification
- Domain: Eukaryota
- Kingdom: Animalia
- Phylum: Arthropoda
- Class: Insecta
- Order: Lepidoptera
- Superfamily: Noctuoidea
- Family: Noctuidae
- Genus: Euamiana
- Species: E. dissimilis

Binomial name
- Euamiana dissimilis (Barnes & McDunnough, 1910)

Species of moth

Euamiana dissimilis is a species of moth in the family Noctuidae (the owlet moths). It was first described by William Barnes and James Halliday McDunnough in 1910 and it is found in North America.

The MONA or Hodges number for Euamiana dissimilis is 9808.
