= Paratrachea viridescens =

Scientific classification
- Domain: Eukaryota
- Kingdom: Animalia
- Phylum: Arthropoda
- Class: Insecta
- Order: Lepidoptera
- Superfamily: Noctuoidea
- Family: Noctuidae
- Genus: Paratrachea
- Species: P. viridescens

Binomial name
- Paratrachea viridescens (Barnes & McDunnough, 1918)

Species of moth

Paratrachea viridescens is a species of mossy sallow in the family of moths known as Noctuidae. It was first described by William Barnes and James Halliday McDunnough in 1918 and it is found in North America.

The MONA or Hodges number for Paratrachea viridescens is 9627.
