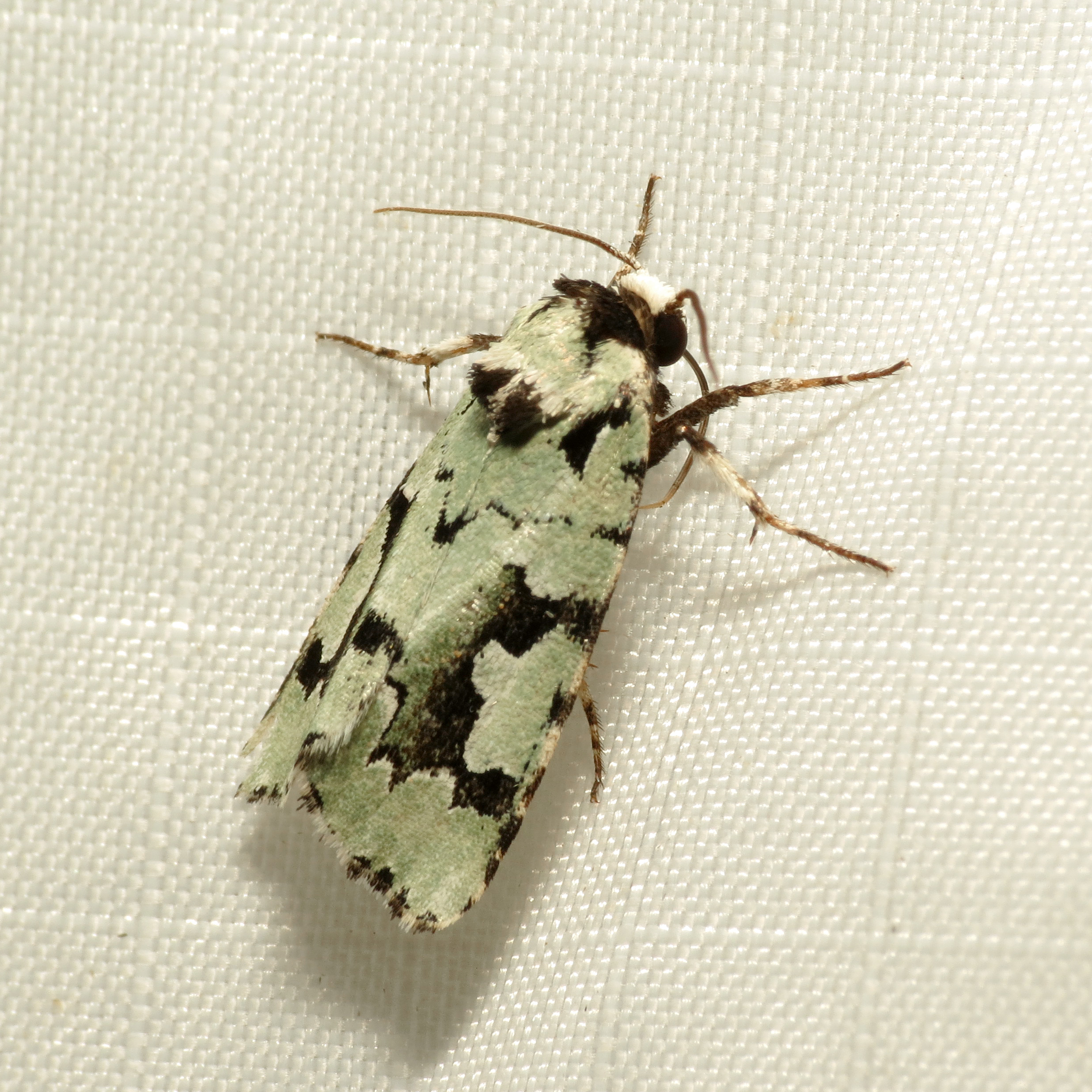

Scientific classification
- Kingdom: Animalia
- Phylum: Arthropoda
- Clade: Pancrustacea
- Class: Insecta
- Order: Lepidoptera
- Superfamily: Noctuoidea
- Family: Noctuidae
- Genus: Emarginea
- Species: E. dulcinea

Binomial name
- Emarginea dulcinea Dyar, 1921

= Emarginea dulcinea =

Species of moth

Emarginea dulcinea is a moth in the family Noctuidae (the owlet moths). The genus was erected by Harrison Gray Dyar Jr. in 1921. It is found in North America.

The MONA or Hodges number for Emarginea dulcinea is 9719.
