= Oxycnemis grandimacula =

Scientific classification
- Domain: Eukaryota
- Kingdom: Animalia
- Phylum: Arthropoda
- Class: Insecta
- Order: Lepidoptera
- Superfamily: Noctuoidea
- Family: Noctuidae
- Genus: Oxycnemis
- Species: O. grandimacula

Binomial name
- Oxycnemis grandimacula Barnes & McDunnough, 1910

Synonyms
- Oxycnemis erratica Barnes & McDunnough, 1913

Species of moth

Oxycnemis grandimacula is a species of moth in the family Noctuidae (the owlet moths). It was first described by William Barnes and James Halliday McDunnough in 1910 and it is found in North America.

The MONA or Hodges number for Oxycnemis grandimacula is 10048.
