= Unciella primula =

Scientific classification
- Domain: Eukaryota
- Kingdom: Animalia
- Phylum: Arthropoda
- Class: Insecta
- Order: Lepidoptera
- Superfamily: Noctuoidea
- Family: Noctuidae
- Genus: Unciella
- Species: U. primula

Binomial name
- Unciella primula (Barnes & McDunnough, 1918)

Species of moth

Unciella primula is a species of moth in the family Noctuidae (the owlet moths). It was first described by William Barnes and James Halliday McDunnough in 1918 and it is found in North America.

The MONA or Hodges number for Unciella primula is 10111.
