= Oxycnemis acuna =

Scientific classification
- Domain: Eukaryota
- Kingdom: Animalia
- Phylum: Arthropoda
- Class: Insecta
- Order: Lepidoptera
- Superfamily: Noctuoidea
- Family: Noctuidae
- Genus: Oxycnemis
- Species: O. acuna

Binomial name
- Oxycnemis acuna Barnes, 1907

Synonyms
- Oxycnemis adusta J. B. Smith, 1907

Species of moth

Oxycnemis acuna is a moth of the family Noctuidae first described by William Barnes in 1907. It is found in North America, including Arizona and Texas.

The wingspan is about 17 mm.
