= Oxycnemis advena =

Scientific classification
- Kingdom: Animalia
- Phylum: Arthropoda
- Class: Insecta
- Order: Lepidoptera
- Superfamily: Noctuoidea
- Family: Noctuidae
- Genus: Oxycnemis
- Species: O. advena

Binomial name
- Oxycnemis advena Grote, 1882

Synonyms
- Acopa pacifica H. Edwards, 1884; Oxycnemis baboquavaria Smith, 1907; Oxycnemis gustis Smith, 1907

Species of moth

Oxycnemis advena is a moth of the family Noctuidae first described by Augustus Radcliffe Grote in 1882. It is found in southwestern North America in the mountains of southern Arizona, eastern Nevada, southern California and southern Baja California.

The wingspan is about 23 mm. Adults are on wing from July to August.
