= Phidrimana =

Scientific classification
- Domain: Eukaryota
- Kingdom: Animalia
- Phylum: Arthropoda
- Class: Insecta
- Order: Lepidoptera
- Superfamily: Noctuoidea
- Family: Noctuidae
- Tribe: Psaphidini
- Genus: Phidrimana; Kononenko, 1989
- Species: P. amurensis

Binomial name
- Phidrimana amurensis (Staudinger, 1892)

Synonyms
- Dryobota amurensis Staudinger, 1892; Miselia sabulosa Graeser, 1892

Genus of moths

Phidrimana is a monotypic moth genus of the family Noctuidae erected by Vladimir S. Kononenko in 1989. Its only species, Phidrimana amurensis, was first described by Staudinger in 1892. It is found in the southern Urals to Amur.
