= Lythrodes tripuncta =

Scientific classification
- Domain: Eukaryota
- Kingdom: Animalia
- Phylum: Arthropoda
- Class: Insecta
- Order: Lepidoptera
- Superfamily: Noctuoidea
- Family: Noctuidae
- Genus: Lythrodes
- Species: L. tripuncta

Binomial name
- Lythrodes tripuncta Barnes & McDunnough, 1911

Species of moth

Lythrodes tripuncta is a species of moth in the family Noctuidae (the owlet moths). It was first described by William Barnes and James Halliday McDunnough in 1911 and it is found in North America.

The MONA or Hodges number for Lythrodes tripuncta is 9734.
