= Oslaria pura =

Scientific classification
- Domain: Eukaryota
- Kingdom: Animalia
- Phylum: Arthropoda
- Class: Insecta
- Order: Lepidoptera
- Superfamily: Noctuoidea
- Family: Noctuidae
- Genus: Oslaria
- Species: O. pura

Binomial name
- Oslaria pura (Barnes & McDunnough, 1911)

Species of moth

Oslaria pura is a species of moth in the family Noctuidae (the owlet moths). It was first described by William Barnes and James Halliday McDunnough in 1911 and it is found in North America.

The MONA or Hodges number for Oslaria pura is 9792.
