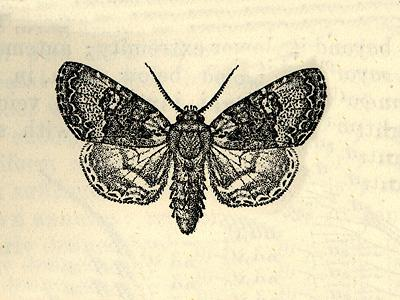

Scientific classification
- Kingdom: Animalia
- Phylum: Arthropoda
- Class: Insecta
- Order: Lepidoptera
- Superfamily: Noctuoidea
- Family: Noctuidae
- Genus: Cropia
- Species: C. indigna

Binomial name
- Cropia indigna (Walker, [1858])

Synonyms
- Decelea indigna Walker, [1858]

= Cropia indigna =

Species of moth

Cropia indigna is a moth of the family Noctuidae first described by Francis Walker in 1858. It is found on Cuba, Hispaniola and Jamaica.
