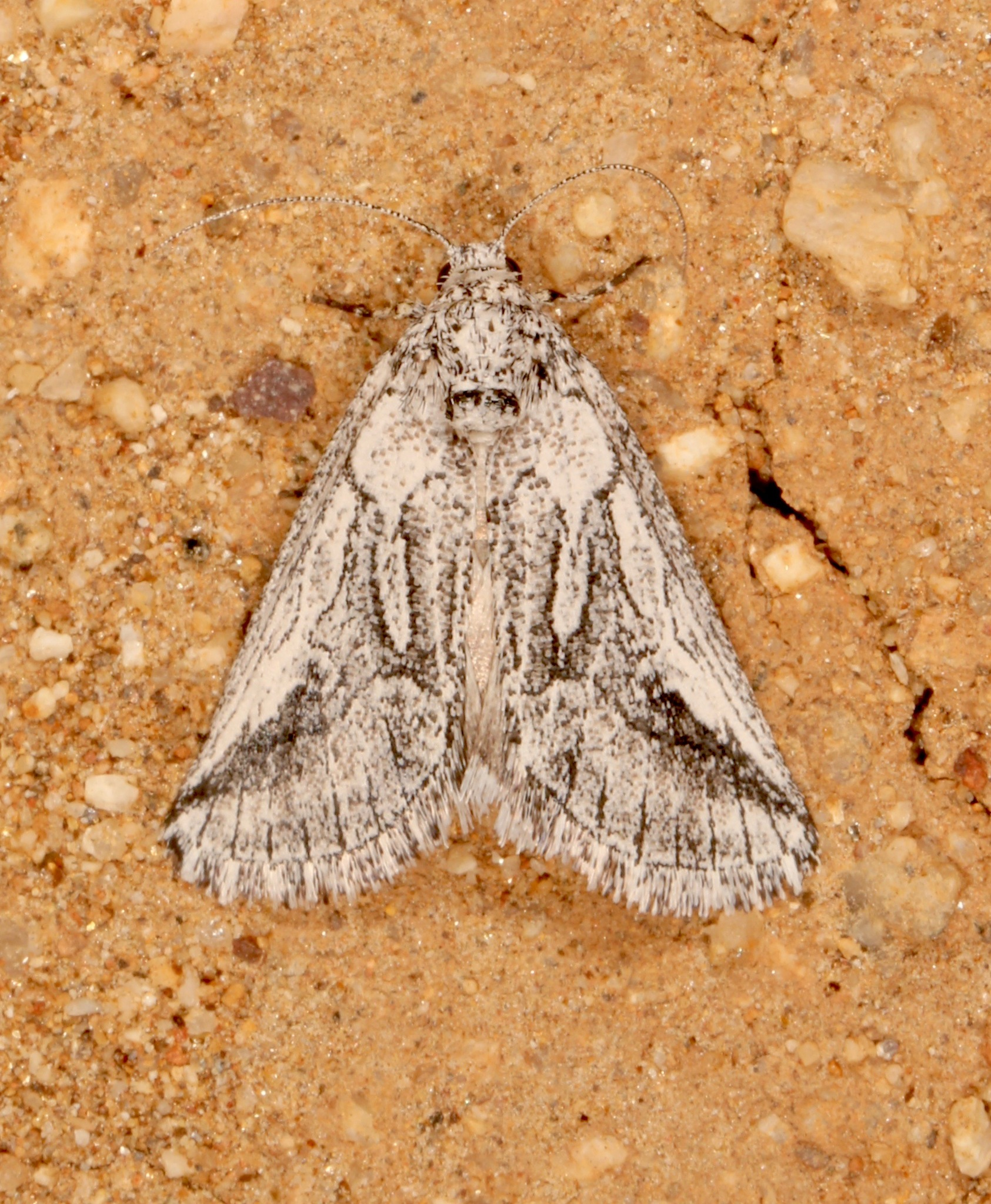

Scientific classification
- Kingdom: Animalia
- Phylum: Arthropoda
- Clade: Pancrustacea
- Class: Insecta
- Order: Lepidoptera
- Superfamily: Noctuoidea
- Family: Noctuidae
- Genus: Oxycnemis
- Species: O. fusimacula

Binomial name
- Oxycnemis fusimacula J. B. Smith, 1902

= Oxycnemis fusimacula =

Species of moth

Oxycnemis fusimacula is a moth of the family Noctuidae first described by John Bernhardt Smith in 1902. It is found in California, Nevada and Baja California.

The wingspan is about 24 mm. Adults are on wing from July to August.

Larvae have been reared on Krameria parvifolia.
