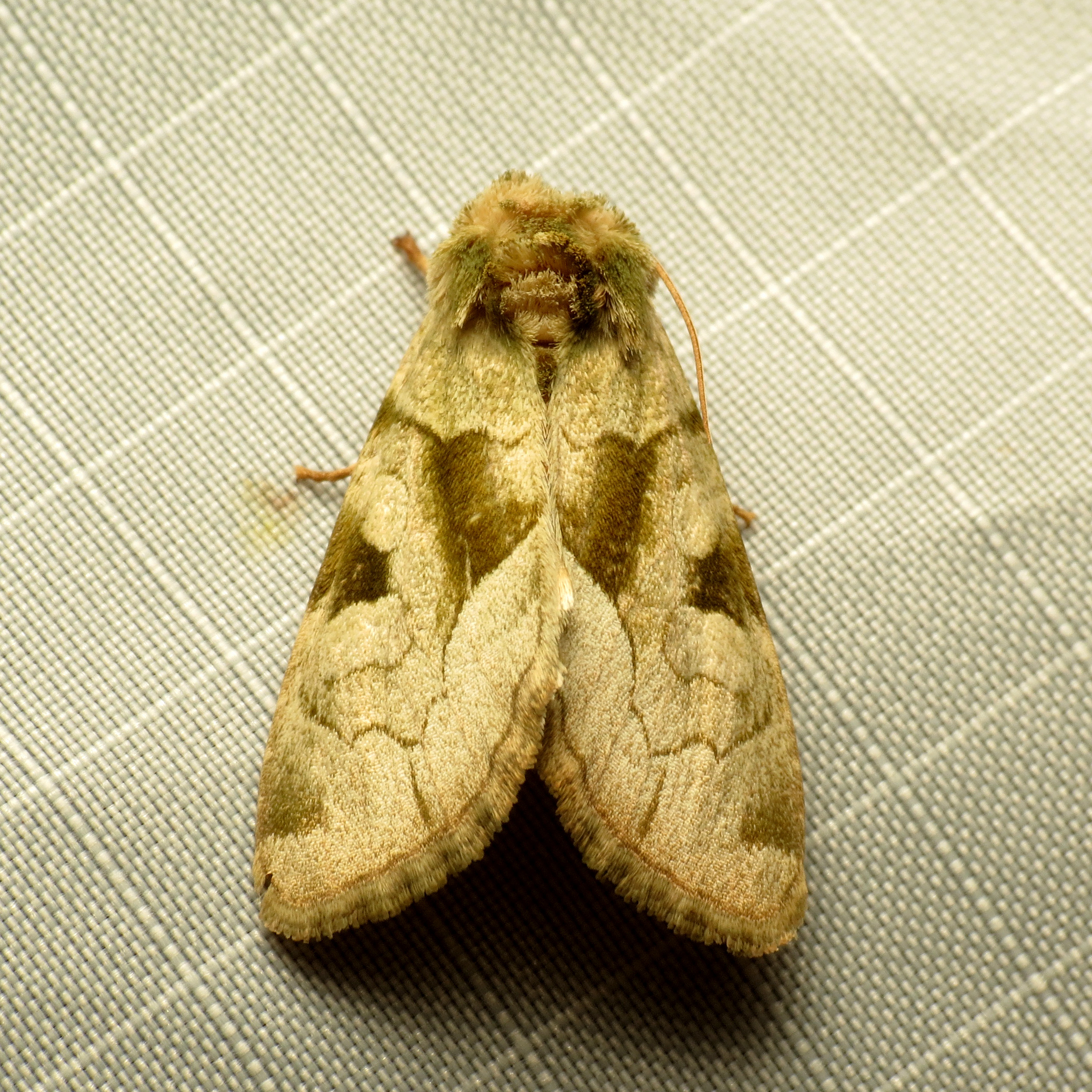

Scientific classification
- Kingdom: Animalia
- Phylum: Arthropoda
- Class: Insecta
- Order: Lepidoptera
- Superfamily: Noctuoidea
- Family: Noctuidae
- Genus: Oslaria
- Species: O. viridifera

Binomial name
- Oslaria viridifera (Grote, 1882)

= Oslaria viridifera =

Species of moth

Oslaria viridifera, the green oslaria, is a moth in the family Noctuidae (the owlet moths). The species was first described by Augustus Radcliffe Grote in 1882. It is found in North America.
