= Pachythrix mniochlora =

Scientific classification
- Kingdom: Animalia
- Phylum: Arthropoda
- Class: Insecta
- Order: Lepidoptera
- Superfamily: Noctuoidea
- Family: Noctuidae
- Genus: Pachythrix
- Species: P. mniochlora

Binomial name
- Pachythrix mniochlora (Meyrick, 1889)

Synonyms
- Hadena mniochlora Meyrick, 1889; Euplexia viridacea Bethune-Baker, 1906

Species of moth

Pachythrix mniochlora is a moth of the family Noctuidae. It is found in Queensland and Papua New Guinea.
