= Speidelia =

Scientific classification
- Domain: Eukaryota
- Kingdom: Animalia
- Phylum: Arthropoda
- Class: Insecta
- Order: Lepidoptera
- Superfamily: Noctuoidea
- Family: Noctuidae
- Tribe: Psaphidini
- Genus: Speidelia; Ronkay, 2000

Genus of moths

Speidelia is a genus of moths of the family Noctuidae.

== Species ==
- Speidelia apocrypha Ronkay, 2000
- Speidelia formosa Ronkay, 2000
- Speidelia taiwana (Wileman, 1915)
