= Nocloa cordova =

Scientific classification
- Domain: Eukaryota
- Kingdom: Animalia
- Phylum: Arthropoda
- Class: Insecta
- Order: Lepidoptera
- Superfamily: Noctuoidea
- Family: Noctuidae
- Genus: Nocloa
- Species: N. cordova

Binomial name
- Nocloa cordova (Barnes, 1907)

Species of moth

Nocloa cordova is a species of moth in the family Noctuidae (the owlet moths). It was first described by William Barnes in 1907 and it is found in North America.

The MONA or Hodges number for Nocloa cordova is 9796.
