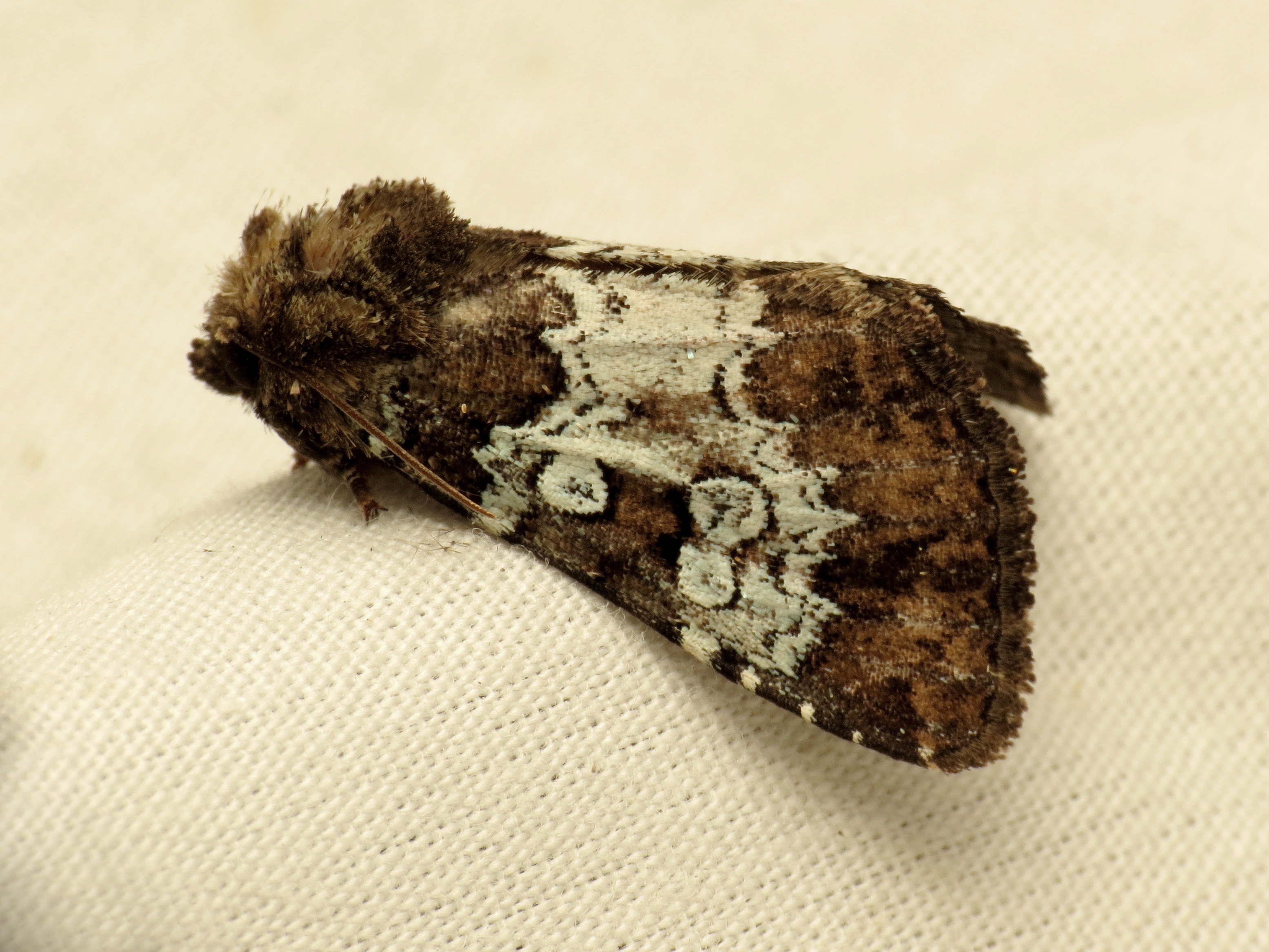

Scientific classification
- Domain: Eukaryota
- Kingdom: Animalia
- Phylum: Arthropoda
- Class: Insecta
- Order: Lepidoptera
- Superfamily: Noctuoidea
- Family: Noctuidae
- Genus: Euamiana
- Species: E. contrasta

Binomial name
- Euamiana contrasta (Barnes & McDunnough, 1910)

= Euamiana contrasta =

Species of moth

Euamiana contrasta is a species of moth in the family Noctuidae (the owlet moths). It was first described by William Barnes and James Halliday McDunnough in 1910 and it is found in North America.

The MONA or Hodges number for Euamiana contrasta is 9807.
