= Copitype =

Scientific classification
- Kingdom: Animalia
- Phylum: Arthropoda
- Class: Insecta
- Order: Lepidoptera
- Superfamily: Noctuoidea
- Family: Noctuidae
- Tribe: Psaphidini
- Genus: Copitype; Hampson, 1906

Genus of moths

Copitype is a genus of moths of the family Noctuidae. The genus was erected by George Hampson in 1906.

== Species ==
- Copitype pagodae (Alphéraky, 1892) Tibet
- Copitype potalae Ronkay & Varga, 1998
