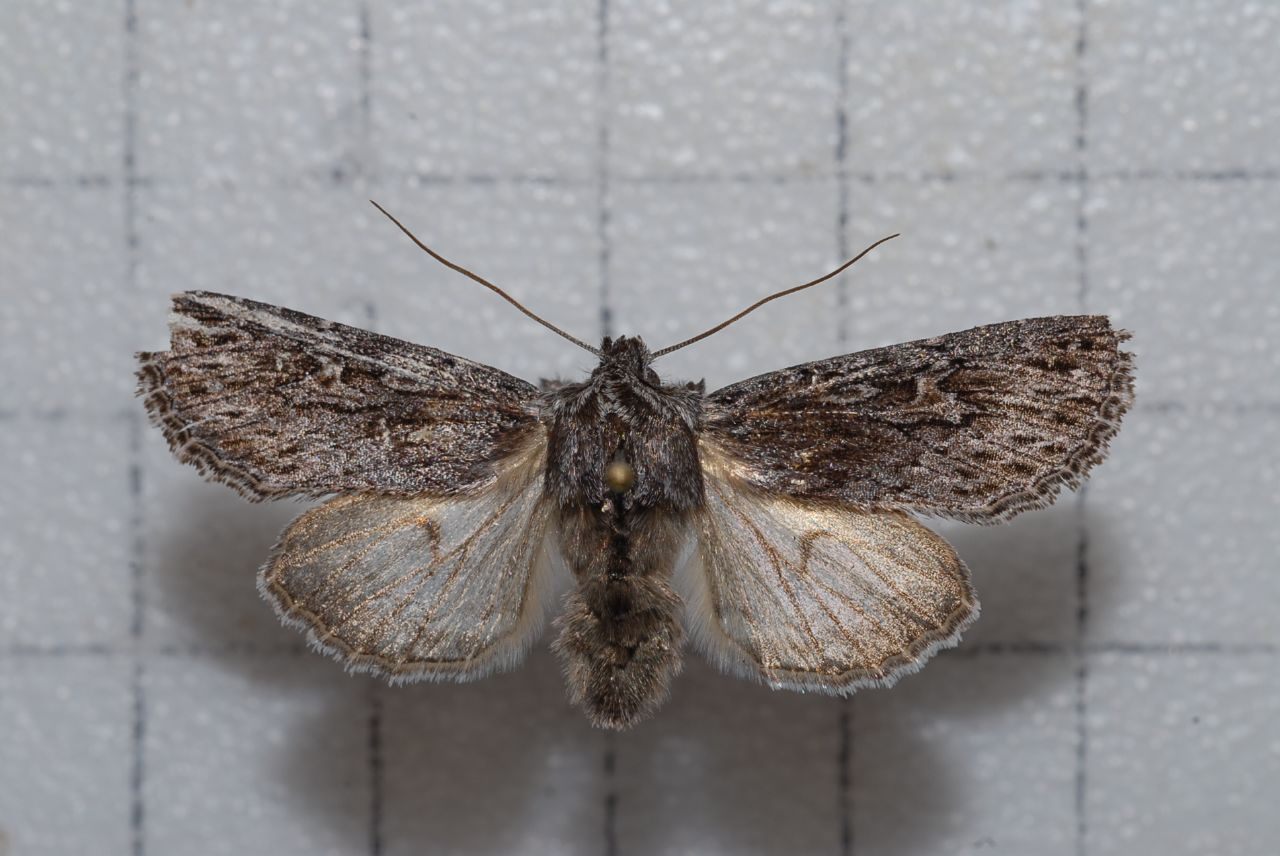

Scientific classification
- Kingdom: Animalia
- Phylum: Arthropoda
- Class: Insecta
- Order: Lepidoptera
- Superfamily: Noctuoidea
- Family: Noctuidae
- Genus: Speidelia
- Species: S. taiwana

Binomial name
- Speidelia taiwana (Wileman, 1915)

Synonyms
- Lophoterges taiwana; ?Cucullia taiwana

= Speidelia taiwana =

Species of moth

Speidelia taiwana is a species of moth of the family Noctuidae. It is found in Taiwan.
