= Nocloa aliaga =

Scientific classification
- Domain: Eukaryota
- Kingdom: Animalia
- Phylum: Arthropoda
- Class: Insecta
- Order: Lepidoptera
- Superfamily: Noctuoidea
- Family: Noctuidae
- Genus: Nocloa
- Species: N. aliaga

Binomial name
- Nocloa aliaga (Barnes, 1905)

Species of moth

Nocloa aliaga is a species of moth in the family Noctuidae (the owlet moths). It was first described by William Barnes in 1905 and it is found in North America.

The MONA or Hodges number for Nocloa aliaga is 9800.
