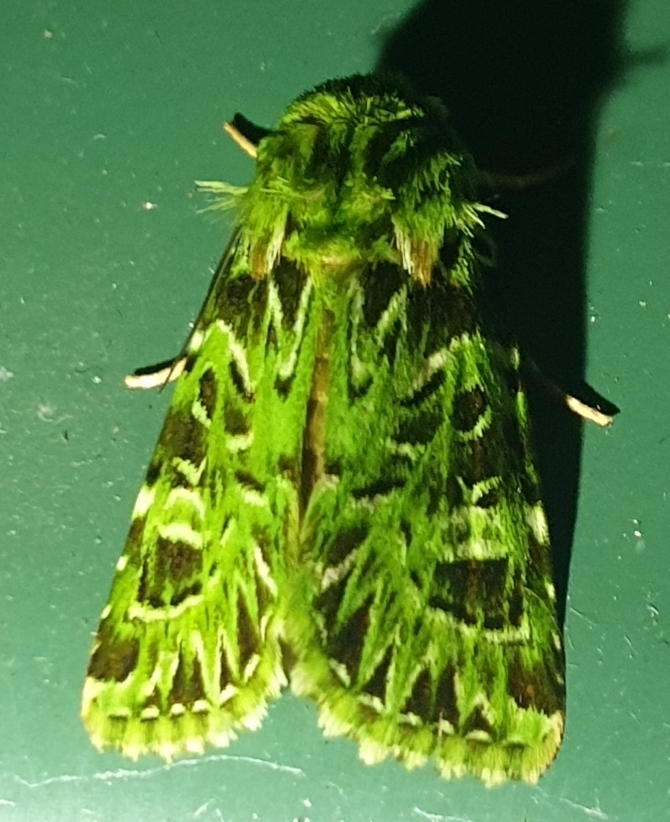

Scientific classification
- Domain: Eukaryota
- Kingdom: Animalia
- Phylum: Arthropoda
- Class: Insecta
- Order: Lepidoptera
- Superfamily: Noctuoidea
- Family: Noctuidae
- Genus: Pachythrix
- Species: P. hampsoni

Binomial name
- Pachythrix hampsoni Nye, 1975

= Pachythrix hampsoni =

Species of moth

Pachythrix hampsoni is a moth of the family Noctuidae. It is found from north-eastern Queensland to central New South Wales.

The wingspan is about 30 mm.
