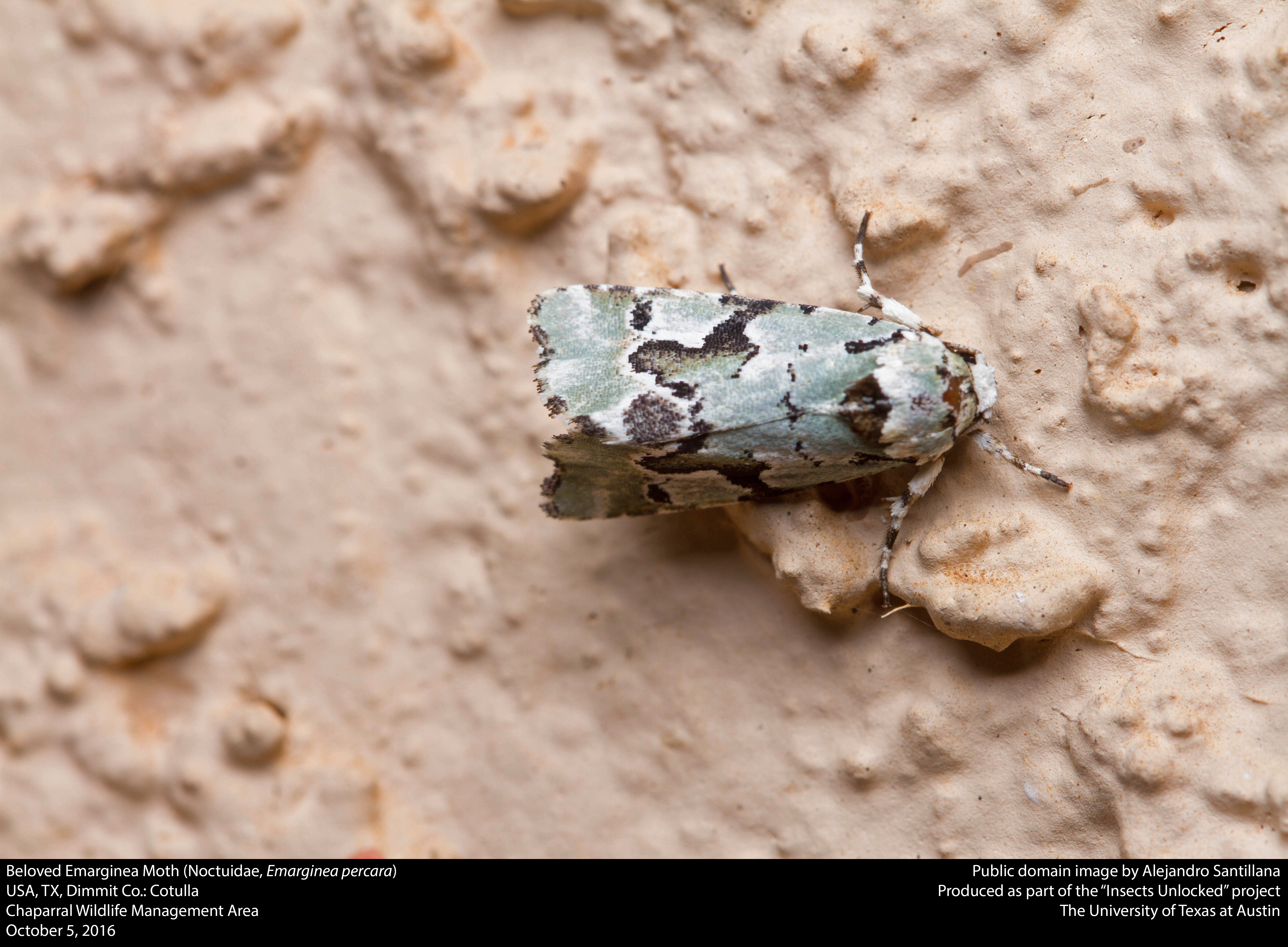

Scientific classification
- Domain: Eukaryota
- Kingdom: Animalia
- Phylum: Arthropoda
- Class: Insecta
- Order: Lepidoptera
- Superfamily: Noctuoidea
- Family: Noctuidae
- Tribe: Psaphidini
- Subtribe: Nocloina
- Genus: Emarginea
- Species: E. percara

Binomial name
- Emarginea percara (Morrison, 1875)

= Emarginea percara =

Species of moth

Emarginea percara, the beloved emarginea moth, is a moth in the family Noctuidae (the owlet moths). The genus was erected by Herbert Knowles Morrison in 1875.

The MONA or Hodges number for Emarginea percara is 9718.

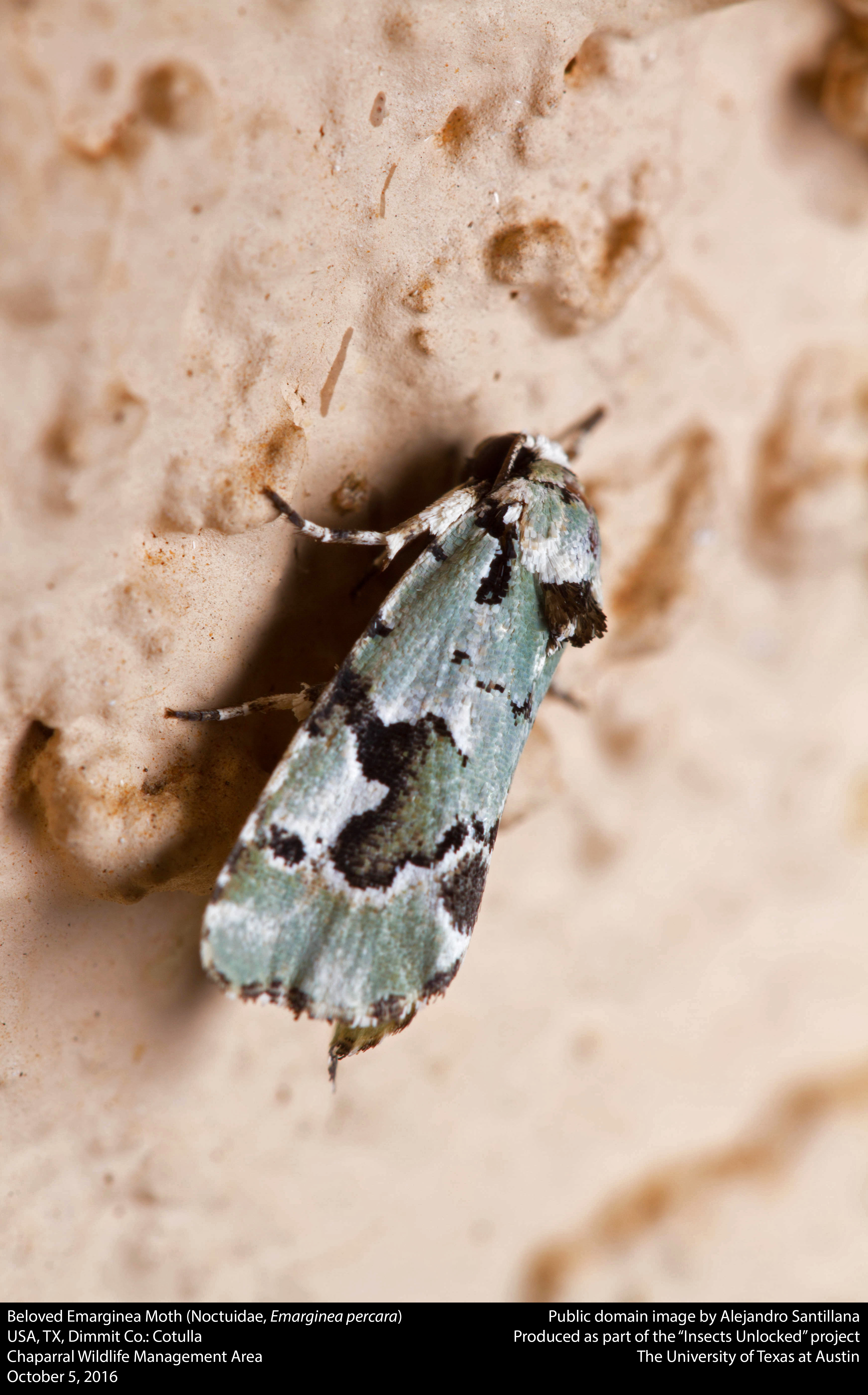
Beloved emarginea moth, Emarginea percara
