= Cropia ruthaea =

Scientific classification
- Kingdom: Animalia
- Phylum: Arthropoda
- Class: Insecta
- Order: Lepidoptera
- Superfamily: Noctuoidea
- Family: Noctuidae
- Genus: Cropia
- Species: C. ruthaea

Binomial name
- Cropia ruthaea Dyar, 1910

Species of moth

Cropia ruthaea is a species of moth in the family Noctuidae (the owlet moths). It is found in North America.

The MONA or Hodges number for Cropia ruthaea is 9622.1.
