= Miracavira brillians =

Scientific classification
- Domain: Eukaryota
- Kingdom: Animalia
- Phylum: Arthropoda
- Class: Insecta
- Order: Lepidoptera
- Superfamily: Noctuoidea
- Family: Noctuidae
- Genus: Miracavira
- Species: M. brillians

Binomial name
- Miracavira brillians Barnes, 1901

Synonyms
- Feralia brillians; Momaphana brillians

Species of moth

Miracavira brillians is a moth of the family Noctuidae first described by William Barnes in 1901. It is found in North America, including Arizona.

The wingspan is about 37 mm.

Larvae have been reared on Ptelea trifoliata.
