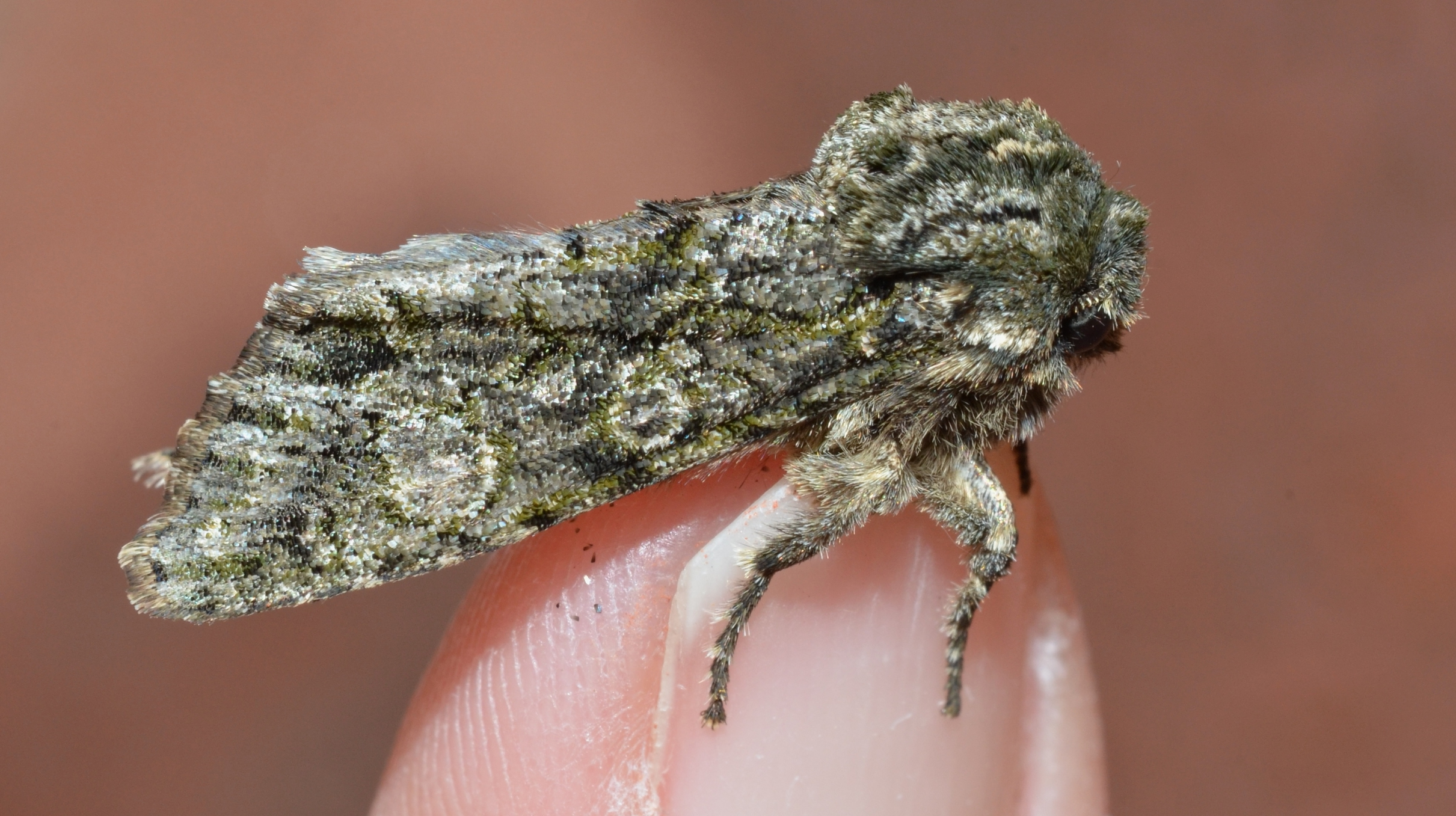

Scientific classification
- Kingdom: Animalia
- Phylum: Arthropoda
- Class: Insecta
- Order: Lepidoptera
- Superfamily: Noctuoidea
- Family: Noctuidae
- Tribe: Psaphidini
- Genus: Copivaleria; Grote, 1883
- Species: C. grotei

Binomial name
- Copivaleria grotei (Morrison, 1874)

Synonyms
- Valeria grotei Morrison, 1874; Psaphida grotei

= Copivaleria =

Genus of moths

Copivaleria is a monotypic moth genus of the family Noctuidae erected by Augustus Radcliffe Grote in 1883. Its only species, Copivaleria grotei, or Grote's sallow, was first described by Herbert Knowles Morrison in 1874. It is found in eastern North America, including Ontario, Tennessee, New York and Maryland.

The wingspan is about 35 mm. Adults are on wing from April to May.

The larvae feed on Fraxinus species.

== Taxonomy ==
The Global Lepidoptera Names Index considers this genus name to be a synonym of Psaphida Walker, 1865.
