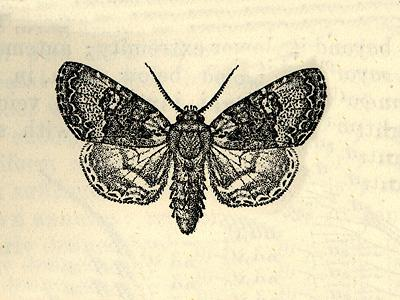
- Cropia indigna

Scientific classification
- Kingdom: Animalia
- Phylum: Arthropoda
- Class: Insecta
- Order: Lepidoptera
- Superfamily: Noctuoidea
- Family: Noctuidae
- Subfamily: Cropiinae
- Genus: Cropia; Walker, 1858

= Cropia =

Genus of moths

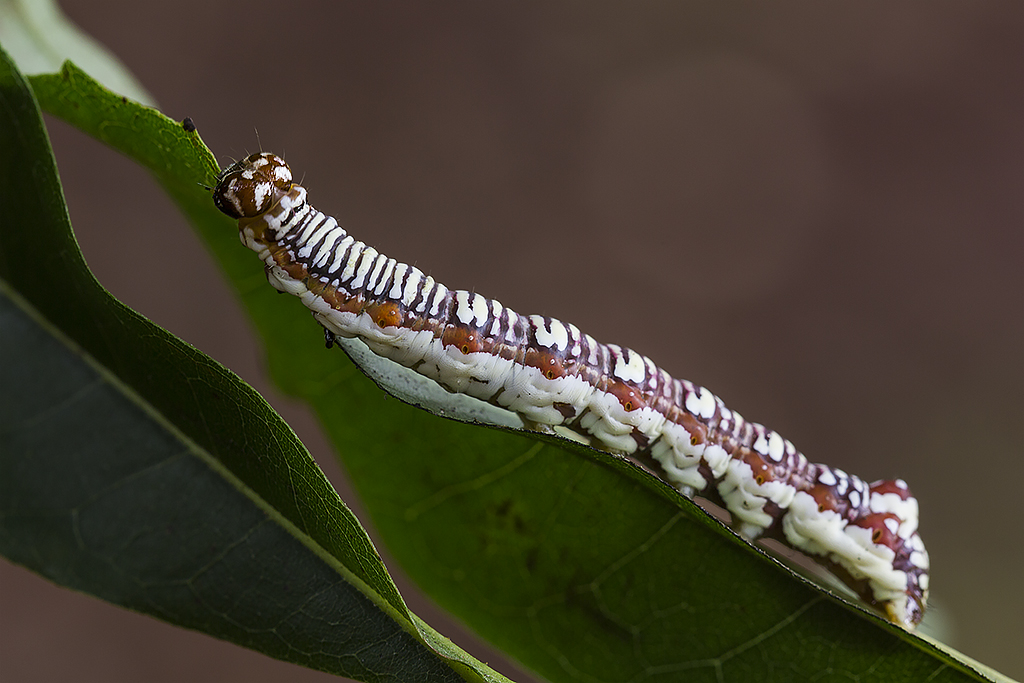
Cropia cedica

Cropia is a genus of moths of the family Noctuidae. The genus was erected by Francis Walker in 1858.

== Species ==
- Cropia albiclava Draudt, 1925
- Cropia aleuca Hampson, 1908
- Cropia carnitincta Hampson, 1908
- Cropia cedica (Stoll, [1782])
- Cropia connecta (Smith, 1894)
- Cropia consonens Dyar, 1910
- Cropia europs Dyar, 1910
- Cropia grandimacula (Schaus, 1911)
- Cropia hadenoides Walker, [1858]
- Cropia indigna (Walker, [1858])
- Cropia infusa (Walker, [1858])
- Cropia isidora Dyar, 1910
- Cropia leucodonta Hampson, 1911
- Cropia minthe (Druce, 1889)
- Cropia perfusa Dyar, 1910
- Cropia phila (Druce, 1889)
- Cropia philosopha Schaus, 1911
- Cropia plumbicincta Hampson, 1908
- Cropia poliomera E. D. Jones, 1908
- Cropia ruthaea Dyar, 1910
- Cropia sigrida Schaus, 1933
- Cropia subapicalis (Walker, [1858])
- Cropia submarginalis Schaus, 1911
- Cropia templada (Schaus, 1906)
- Cropia tessellata (Sepp, [1840])
