= Euamiana endopolia =

Scientific classification
- Kingdom: Animalia
- Phylum: Arthropoda
- Clade: Pancrustacea
- Class: Insecta
- Order: Lepidoptera
- Superfamily: Noctuoidea
- Family: Noctuidae
- Genus: Euamiana
- Species: E. endopolia

Binomial name
- Euamiana endopolia (Dyar, 1912)

Synonyms
- Euamiana exculta (A. Blanchard and Knudson, 1986)

Species of moth

Euamiana endopolia is a moth in the family Noctuidae (the owlet moths). It was described by Harrison Gray Dyar Jr. in 1912 and is found in North America.

The MONA or Hodges number for Euamiana endopolia is 9806.1.
