= Paramiana =

Scientific classification
- Kingdom: Animalia
- Phylum: Arthropoda
- Clade: Pancrustacea
- Class: Insecta
- Order: Lepidoptera
- Superfamily: Noctuoidea
- Family: Noctuidae
- Subtribe: Nocloina
- Genus: Paramiana; Barnes & Benjamin, 1924

Genus of moths

Paramiana is a genus of moths of the family Noctuidae erected by William Barnes and Foster Hendrickson Benjamin in 1924.

== Species ==
- Paramiana callaisata Blanchard, 1972
- Paramiana canoa (Barnes, 1907)
- Paramiana marina (J. B. Smith, 1906)
- Paramiana perissa Nye, 1975
- Paramiana smaragdina (Neumoegen, 1884)

== Former species ==
- Paramiana exculta Blanchard & Knudson, 1986 is now a synonym of Euamiana endopolia (Dyar, 1912)
