= Ruacodes =

Scientific classification
- Kingdom: Animalia
- Phylum: Arthropoda
- Class: Insecta
- Order: Lepidoptera
- Superfamily: Noctuoidea
- Family: Noctuidae
- Tribe: Psaphidini
- Genus: Ruacodes; Hampson, 1908
- Species: R. tela

Binomial name
- Ruacodes tela (J. B. Smith, 1900)

Synonyms
- Hadena tela J. B. Smith, 1900

Genus of moths

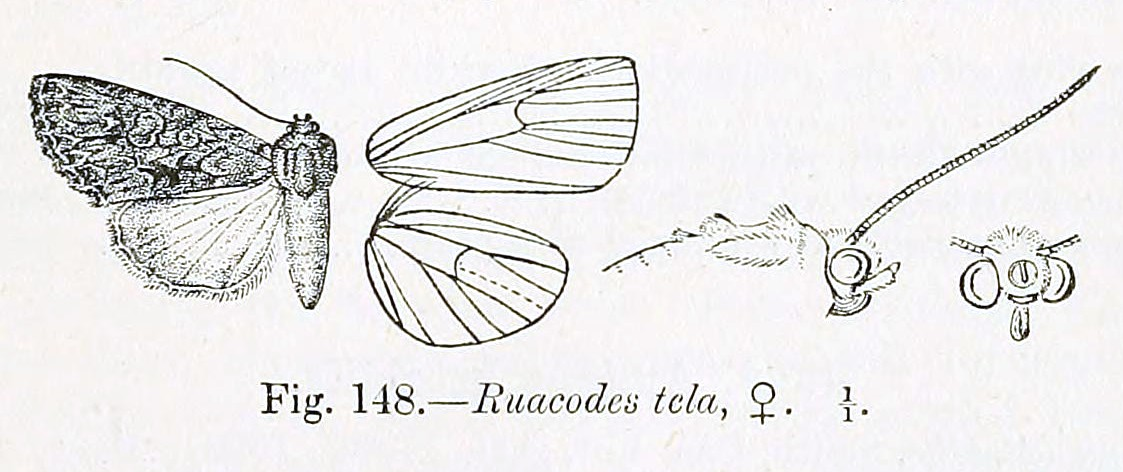
Ruacodes tela

Ruacodes is a monotypic moth genus of the family Noctuidae erected by George Hampson in 1908. Its only species, Ruacodes tela, was first described by John Bernhardt Smith in 1900. The species is found in the US state of Arizona.
