= Apsaphida =

Scientific classification
- Domain: Eukaryota
- Kingdom: Animalia
- Phylum: Arthropoda
- Class: Insecta
- Order: Lepidoptera
- Superfamily: Noctuoidea
- Family: Noctuidae
- Tribe: Psaphidini
- Genus: Apsaphida; Franclemont, 1973
- Species: A. eremna

Binomial name
- Apsaphida eremna Franclemont, 1973

Genus of moths

Apsaphida is a monotypic moth genus of the family Noctuidae. Its only species, Apsaphida eremna, is found in the US state of Arizona. Both the genus and species were first described by John G. Franclemont in 1973.
