= Walterella =

Scientific classification
- Kingdom: Animalia
- Phylum: Arthropoda
- Class: Insecta
- Order: Lepidoptera
- Superfamily: Noctuoidea
- Family: Noctuidae
- Tribe: Psaphidini
- Genus: Walterella; Dyar, 1921
- Species: W. ocellata

Binomial name
- Walterella ocellata (Barnes & McDunnough, 1910)

Synonyms
- Prothrinax ocellata Barnes & McDunnough, 1910

Genus and species of moth

Walterella is a monotypic moth genus of the family Noctuidae erected by Harrison Gray Dyar Jr. in 1921. Its only species, Walterella ocellata, was first described by William Barnes and James Halliday McDunnough in 1910. It is found in the US state of Arizona.
