= Petalumaria =

Scientific classification
- Domain: Eukaryota
- Kingdom: Animalia
- Phylum: Arthropoda
- Class: Insecta
- Order: Lepidoptera
- Superfamily: Noctuoidea
- Family: Noctuidae
- Tribe: Psaphidini
- Genus: Petalumaria; Buckett & Bauer, 1967
- Species: P. californica

Binomial name
- Petalumaria californica (Buckett & Bauer, 1964)

Synonyms
- Petaluma Buckett & Bauer, 1964

Genus and species of moth

Petalumaria is a monotypic moth genus of the family Noctuidae. Its only species, Petalumaria californica, is found in the US state of California. Both the genus and species were first described by John S. Buckett and William R. Bauer, the genus in 1967 and the species three years earlier in 1964.
