= Provia argentata =

Scientific classification
- Kingdom: Animalia
- Phylum: Arthropoda
- Class: Insecta
- Order: Lepidoptera
- Superfamily: Noctuoidea
- Family: Noctuidae
- Tribe: Psaphidini
- Genus: Provia; Barnes & McDunnough, 1910
- Species: P. argentata

Binomial name
- Provia argentata Barnes & McDunnough, 1910

Species of moth

Provia argentata is the only species in the monotypic moth genus Provia belonging to the family Noctuidae. It is found in the US state of Utah. Both the genus and species were first described by William Barnes and James Halliday McDunnough in 1910.
