= Miracavira =

- Miracavira brillians

Scientific classification
- Domain: Eukaryota
- Kingdom: Animalia
- Phylum: Arthropoda
- Class: Insecta
- Order: Lepidoptera
- Superfamily: Noctuoidea
- Family: Noctuidae
- Tribe: Psaphidini
- Genus: Miracavira; Franclemont, 1937

Genus of moths

Miracavira is a genus of moths of the family Noctuidae. The genus was erected by John G. Franclemont in 1937.

== Species ==
- Miracavira annadora (Dyar, 1913)
- Miracavira brillians (Barnes, 1901)
- Miracavira sylvia (Dyar, 1913)
