= Policocnemis =

Scientific classification
- Domain: Eukaryota
- Kingdom: Animalia
- Phylum: Arthropoda
- Class: Insecta
- Order: Lepidoptera
- Superfamily: Noctuoidea
- Family: Noctuidae
- Tribe: Psaphidini
- Genus: Policocnemis; Benjamin, 1932
- Species: P. ungulatus

Binomial name
- Policocnemis ungulatus Benjamin, 1932

Genus of moths

Policocnemis is a monotypic moth genus of the family Noctuidae. Its only species, Policocnemis ungulatus, is found in the US state of Texas. Both the genus and species were first described by Foster Hendrickson Benjamin in 1932.
