= Redingtonia =

Scientific classification
- Domain: Eukaryota
- Kingdom: Animalia
- Phylum: Arthropoda
- Class: Insecta
- Order: Lepidoptera
- Superfamily: Noctuoidea
- Family: Noctuidae
- Tribe: Psaphidini
- Genus: Redingtonia; Barnes & McDunnough, 1912
- Species: R. alba

Binomial name
- Redingtonia alba Barnes & McDunnough, 1912

Genus of moths

Redingtonia is a monotypic moth genus of the family Noctuidae. Its only species, Redingtonia alba, is found in the US state of Arizona. Both the genus and species were first described by William Barnes and James Halliday McDunnough in 1912.
