= Viridemas =

Scientific classification
- Domain: Eukaryota
- Kingdom: Animalia
- Phylum: Arthropoda
- Class: Insecta
- Order: Lepidoptera
- Superfamily: Noctuoidea
- Family: Noctuidae
- Tribe: Psaphidini
- Genus: Viridemas; J. B. Smith, 1908
- Species: V. galena

Binomial name
- Viridemas galena J. B. Smith, 1908

Genus and species of moth

Viridemas is a monotypic moth genus of the family Noctuidae. Its only species, Viridemas galena, is found in the US state of Arizona. Both the genus and species were first described by John Bernhardt Smith in 1908.
