= Pleromella =

Scientific classification
- Domain: Eukaryota
- Kingdom: Animalia
- Phylum: Arthropoda
- Class: Insecta
- Order: Lepidoptera
- Superfamily: Noctuoidea
- Family: Noctuidae
- Tribe: Psaphidini
- Genus: Pleromella; Dyar, 1921
- Species: P. opter

Binomial name
- Pleromella opter Dyar, 1921

Genus of moths

Pleromella is a monotypic moth genus of the family Noctuidae. Its only species, Pleromella opter, is found in western North America in southern Oregon, California and Baja California. Both the genus and species were first described by Harrison Gray Dyar Jr. in 1921.
