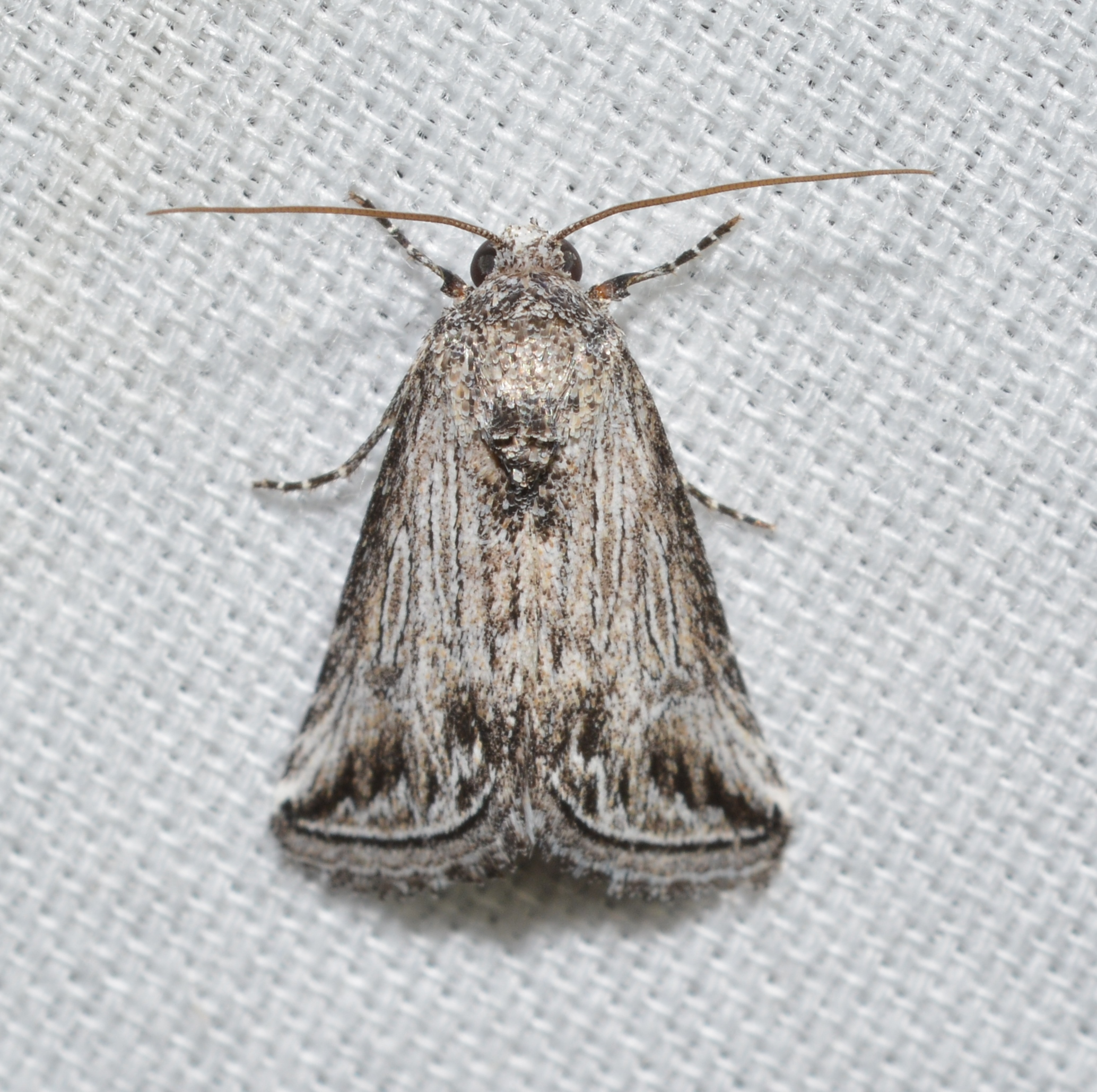

Scientific classification
- Kingdom: Animalia
- Phylum: Arthropoda
- Class: Insecta
- Order: Lepidoptera
- Superfamily: Noctuoidea
- Family: Noctuidae
- Genus: Oxycnemis
- Species: O. gracillinea

Binomial name
- Oxycnemis gracillinea (Grote, 1881)

= Oxycnemis gracillinea =

Species of moth

Oxycnemis gracillinea is a moth in the family Noctuidae (the owlet moths). The species was first described by Augustus Radcliffe Grote in 1881. It is found in North America.

The MONA or Hodges number for Oxycnemis gracillinea is 10043.
