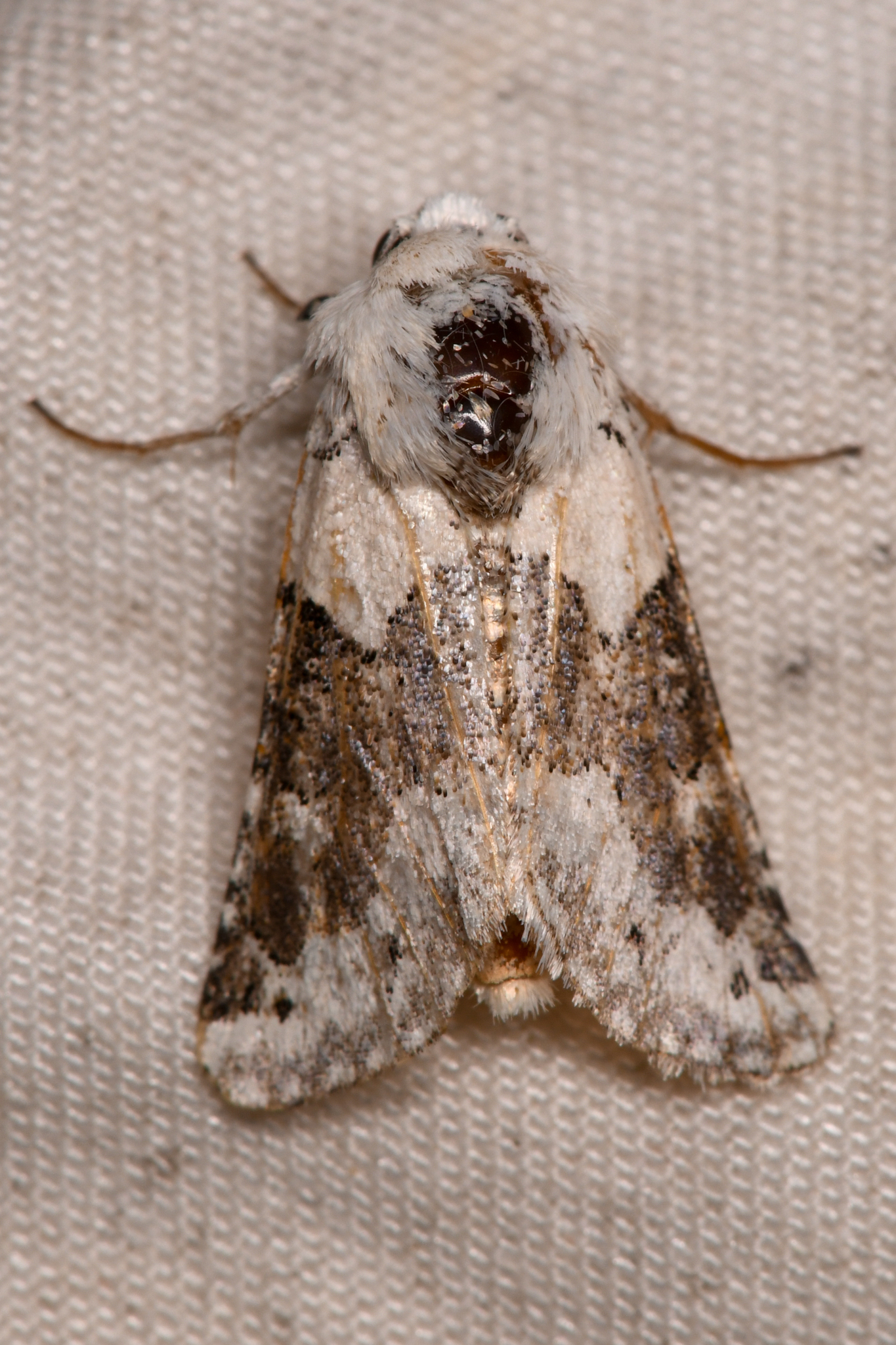

Scientific classification
- Domain: Eukaryota
- Kingdom: Animalia
- Phylum: Arthropoda
- Class: Insecta
- Order: Lepidoptera
- Superfamily: Noctuoidea
- Family: Noctuidae
- Genus: Triocnemis; Grote, 1881
- Species: T. saporis

Binomial name
- Triocnemis saporis Grote, 1881

= Triocnemis =

Triocnemis saporis

Genus of moths

Triocnemis is a monotypic genus of moths in the family Noctuidae. Its only species, Triocnemis saporis, is found in the western US states of Washington, Colorado, California and Arizona. Both the genus and species were first described by Augustus Radcliffe Grote in 1881.
