= Emarginea =

Scientific classification
- Kingdom: Animalia
- Phylum: Arthropoda
- Clade: Pancrustacea
- Class: Insecta
- Order: Lepidoptera
- Superfamily: Noctuoidea
- Family: Noctuidae
- Subtribe: Nocloina
- Genus: Emarginea; Guenée, 1852

Synonyms
- Dacira Walker, [1858]; Cyathissa Grote, 1881

Genus of moths

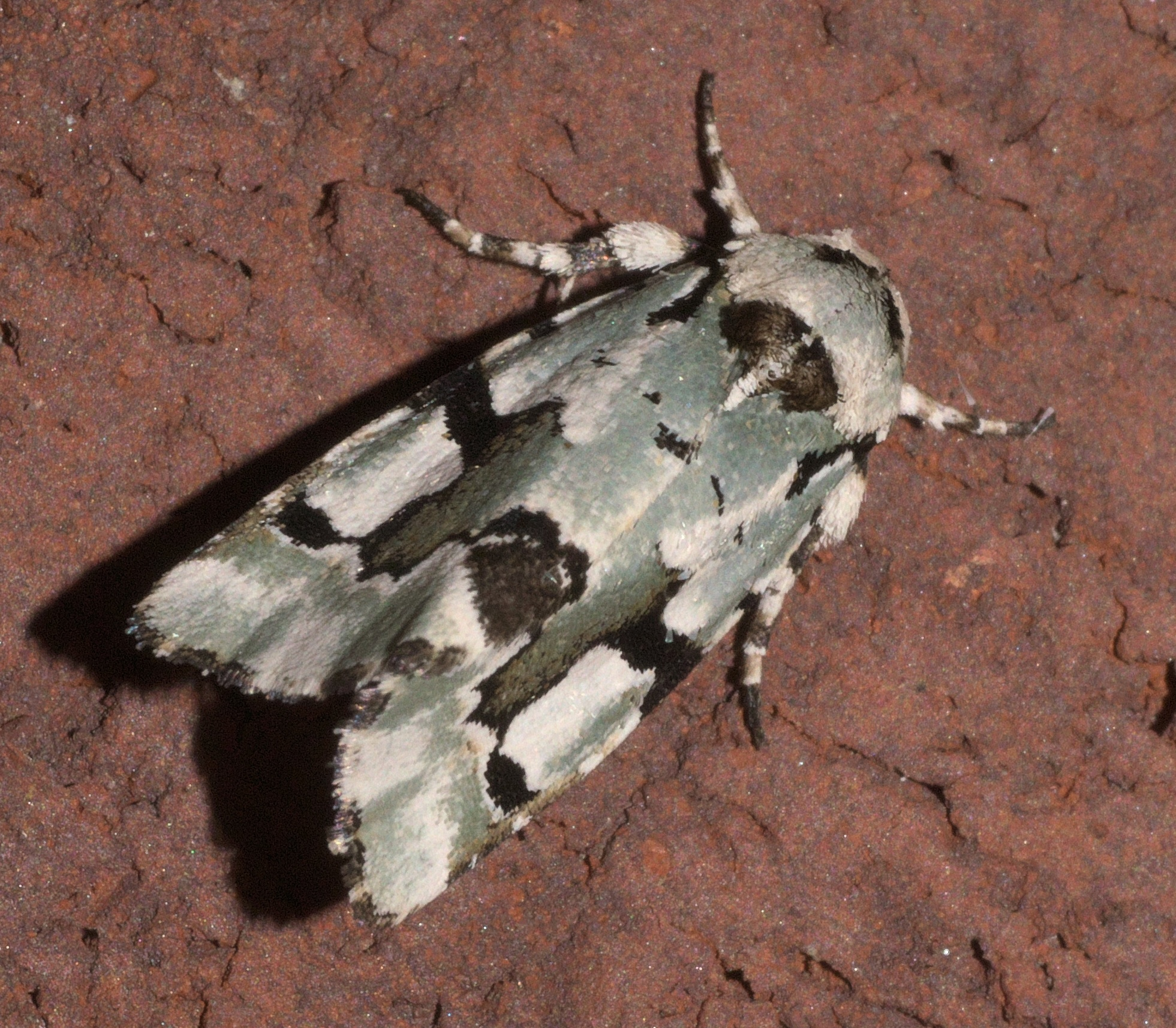
Emarginea percara

Emarginea is a genus of moths of the family Noctuidae. The genus was erected by Achille Guenée in 1852.

== Species ==
- Emarginea anna Schaus, 1911
- Emarginea combusta (Walker, [1858])
- Emarginea dulcinea Dyar, 1921 (misspelling Emarginea dulcinia)
- Emarginea empyra Dyar, 1909
- Emarginea gammophora Guenée, 1852
- Emarginea minastes Dyar, 1920
- Emarginea niphoplaga Druce, 1909
- Emarginea nocea Dyar, 1912
- Emarginea oleagina (Dognin, 1889)
- Emarginea pallida (Smith, 1902)
- Emarginea partitella (Maassen, 1890)
- Emarginea percara (Morrison, 1875)
