= Oxycnemis =

- Oxycnemis acuna

Scientific classification
- Kingdom: Animalia
- Phylum: Arthropoda
- Class: Insecta
- Order: Lepidoptera
- Superfamily: Noctuoidea
- Family: Noctuidae
- Subtribe: Triocnemidina
- Genus: Oxycnemis; Grote, 1882

Genus of moths

Oxycnemis is a genus of moths of the family Noctuidae. The genus was erected by Augustus Radcliffe Grote in 1882.

== Species ==
- Oxycnemis acuna Barnes, 1907
- Oxycnemis advena Grote, 1882
- Oxycnemis franclemonti Blanchard, 1968
- Oxycnemis fusimacula J.B. Smith, 1902
- Oxycnemis gracillinea (Grote, 1881)
- Oxycnemis grandimacula Barnes & McDunnough, 1910 (=Oxycnemis erratica Barnes & McDunnough, 1913)
- Oxycnemis gustis Smith, 1907
- Oxycnemis orbicularis Barnes & McDunnough, 1912

== Former species ==
- Oxycnemis subsimplex Dyar, 1904 is now Sympistis subsimplex (Dyar, 1904)
