= Crimona =

Scientific classification
- Domain: Eukaryota
- Kingdom: Animalia
- Phylum: Arthropoda
- Class: Insecta
- Order: Lepidoptera
- Superfamily: Noctuoidea
- Family: Noctuidae
- Subtribe: Triocnemidina
- Genus: Crimona; J. B. Smith, 1902

Genus of moths

Crimona is a genus of moths of the family Noctuidae erected by John Bernhardt Smith in 1902.

== Species ==
- Crimona grisalba Köhler, 1979
- Crimona leuca Köhler, 1979
- Crimona nana Angulo & Olivares, 1999
- Crimona pallimedia Smith, 1902
- Crimona tricolor Köhler, 1979
