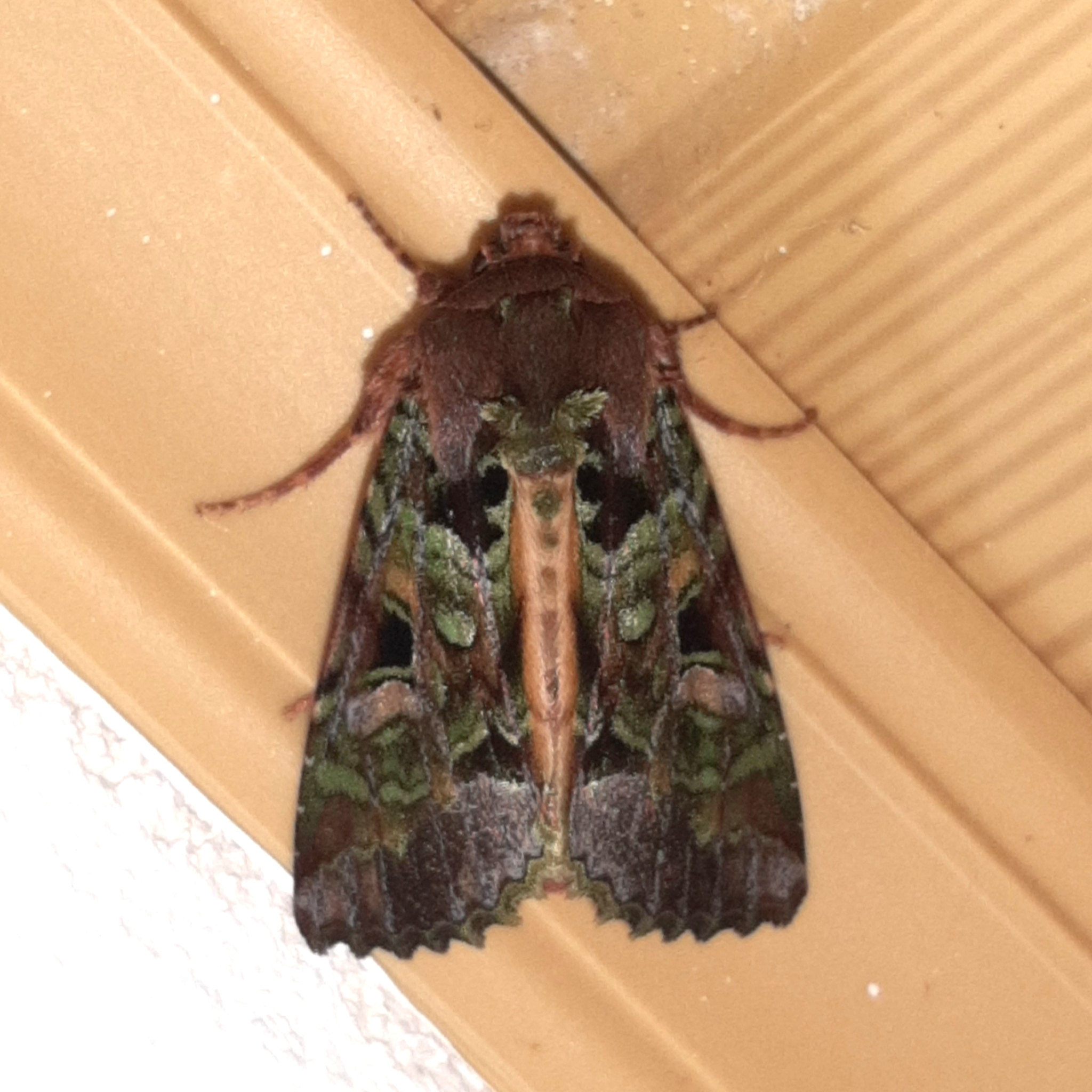
- Paratrachea laches

Scientific classification
- Kingdom: Animalia
- Phylum: Arthropoda
- Class: Insecta
- Order: Lepidoptera
- Superfamily: Noctuoidea
- Family: Noctuidae
- Subtribe: Feraliina
- Genus: Paratrachea; Hampson, 1908

= Paratrachea =

Genus of moths

Paratrachea is a genus of moths of the family Noctuidae. The genus was erected by George Hampson in 1908.

== Species ==
- Paratrachea laches (Druce, 1889)
- Paratrachea viridescens (Barnes & McDunnough, 1918)
