= Prothrinax =

Scientific classification
- Kingdom: Animalia
- Phylum: Arthropoda
- Class: Insecta
- Order: Lepidoptera
- Superfamily: Noctuoidea
- Family: Noctuidae
- Subtribe: Nocloina
- Genus: Prothrinax; Hampson, 1908

Genus of moths

Prothrinax is a genus of moths of the family Noctuidae. The genus was erected by George Hampson in 1908.

== Species ==
- Prothrinax luteomedia (Smith, 1907)
- Prothrinax incana Köhler, 1979
