= Lythrodes =

Scientific classification
- Domain: Eukaryota
- Kingdom: Animalia
- Phylum: Arthropoda
- Class: Insecta
- Order: Lepidoptera
- Superfamily: Noctuoidea
- Family: Noctuidae
- Subtribe: Nocloina
- Genus: Lythrodes; J. B. Smith, 1903

Genus of moths

Lythrodes is a genus of moths of the family Noctuidae. The genus was erected by John Bernhardt Smith in 1903.

== Species ==
- Lythrodes radiatus Smith, 1903
- Lythrodes tripuncta Barnes & McDunnough, 1911
- Lythrodes venatus J. B. Smith, 1903 (alternative spelling Lythrodes venata)
