= Euamiana =

Scientific classification
- Domain: Eukaryota
- Kingdom: Animalia
- Phylum: Arthropoda
- Class: Insecta
- Order: Lepidoptera
- Superfamily: Noctuoidea
- Family: Noctuidae
- Subtribe: Nocloina
- Genus: Euamiana; Barnes & Benjamin, [1927]

Genus of moths

Euamiana is a genus of moths of the family Noctuidae erected by William Barnes and Foster Hendrickson Benjamin in 1927.

== Species ==
- Euamiana adusta Blanchard & Knudson, 1986
- Euamiana contrasta (Barnes & McDunnough, 1910)
- Euamiana dissimilis (Barnes & McDunnough, 1910)
- Euamiana endopolia (Dyar, 1912)
- Euamiana torniplaga (Barnes & McDunnough, 1916)
