= Nocloa =

- Nocloa ezeha

Scientific classification
- Kingdom: Animalia
- Phylum: Arthropoda
- Clade: Pancrustacea
- Class: Insecta
- Order: Lepidoptera
- Superfamily: Noctuoidea
- Family: Noctuidae
- Subtribe: Nocloina
- Genus: Nocloa; J. B. Smith, 1906

Synonyms
- Phaioecia Dyar, 1911

Genus of moths

Nocloa is a genus of moths of the family Noctuidae. The genus was erected by John Bernhardt Smith in 1906.

== Species ==
- Nocloa alcandra (H. Druce, 1890) Mexico
- Nocloa aliaga (Barnes, 1905) Arizona, New Mexico
- Nocloa beata Dyar, 1918 Mexico
- Nocloa cordova (Barnes, 1907) Arizona
- Nocloa duplicatus (J. B. Smith, 1891) Colorado
- Nocloa ezeha Dyar, 1914 Mexico
- Nocloa lamiota Dyar, 1918 Mexico
- Nocloa nanata (Neumoegen, 1884) New Mexico
- Nocloa pallens (Tepper, 1883) California
- Nocloa periodita Dyar, 1913 Mexico
- Nocloa pilacho (Barnes, 1904) Arizona
- Nocloa plagiata J. B. Smith, 1906 Arizona
- Nocloa rivulosa J. B. Smith, 1906 Arizona, California
