= Pseudocopivaleria =

Scientific classification
- Domain: Eukaryota
- Kingdom: Animalia
- Phylum: Arthropoda
- Class: Insecta
- Order: Lepidoptera
- Superfamily: Noctuoidea
- Family: Noctuidae
- Subtribe: Psaphidina
- Genus: Pseudocopivaleria; Buckett & Bauer, 1966

Genus of moths

Pseudocopivaleria is a genus of moths of the family Noctuidae. The genus was erected by John S. Buckett and William R. Bauer in 1966.

== Species ==
- Pseudocopivaleria anaverta Buckett & Bauer, 1966
- Pseudocopivaleria sonoma (McDunnough, 1941)
