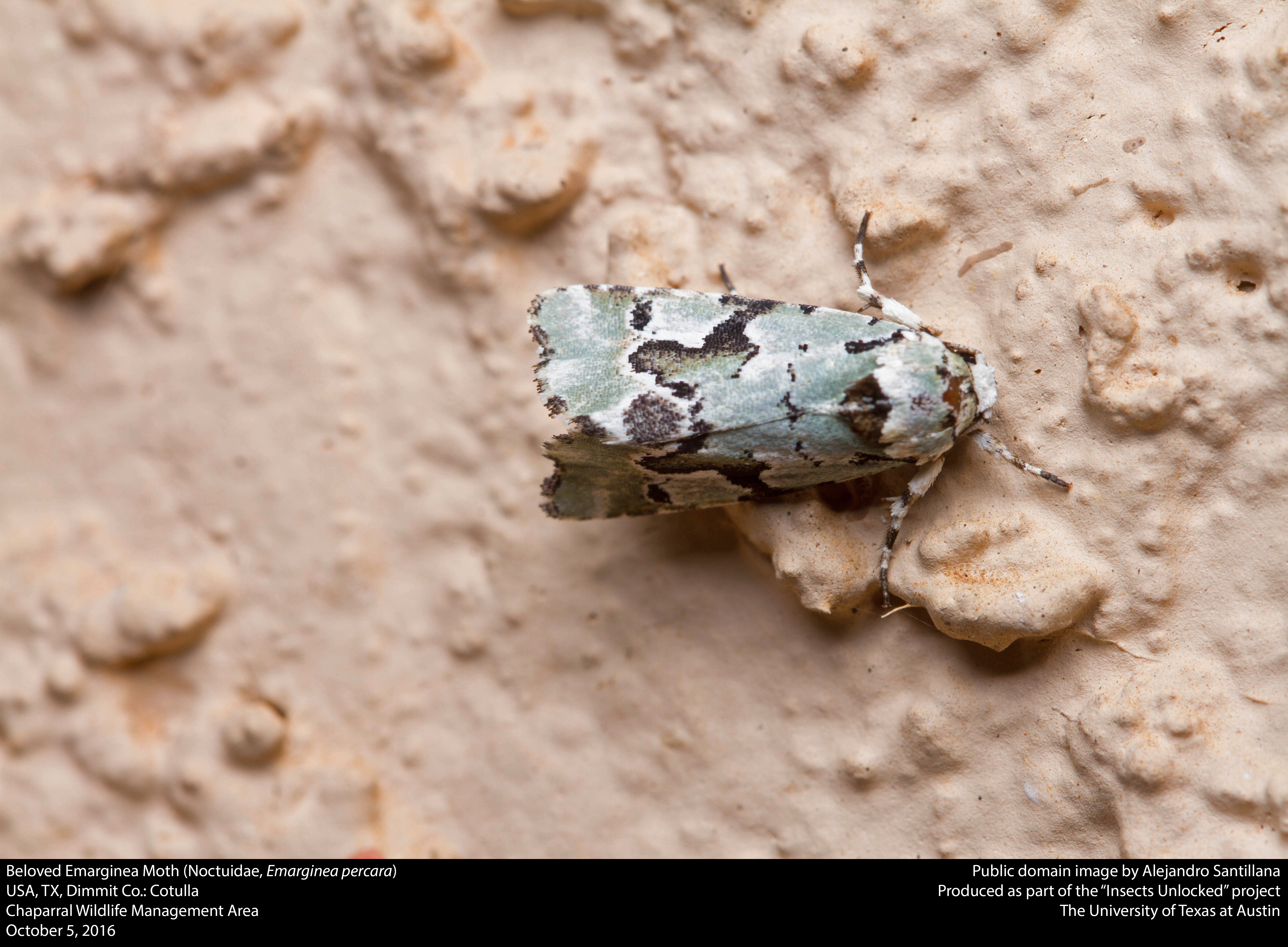
- Emarginea percara

Scientific classification
- Kingdom: Animalia
- Phylum: Arthropoda
- Clade: Pancrustacea
- Class: Insecta
- Order: Lepidoptera
- Superfamily: Noctuoidea
- Family: Noctuidae
- Subfamily: Amphipyrinae
- Tribe: Psaphidini

= Psaphidini =

Tribe of moths

Psaphidini is a tribe of owlet moths in the family Noctuidae. There are at least 40 genera and at least 90 described species in Psaphidini.

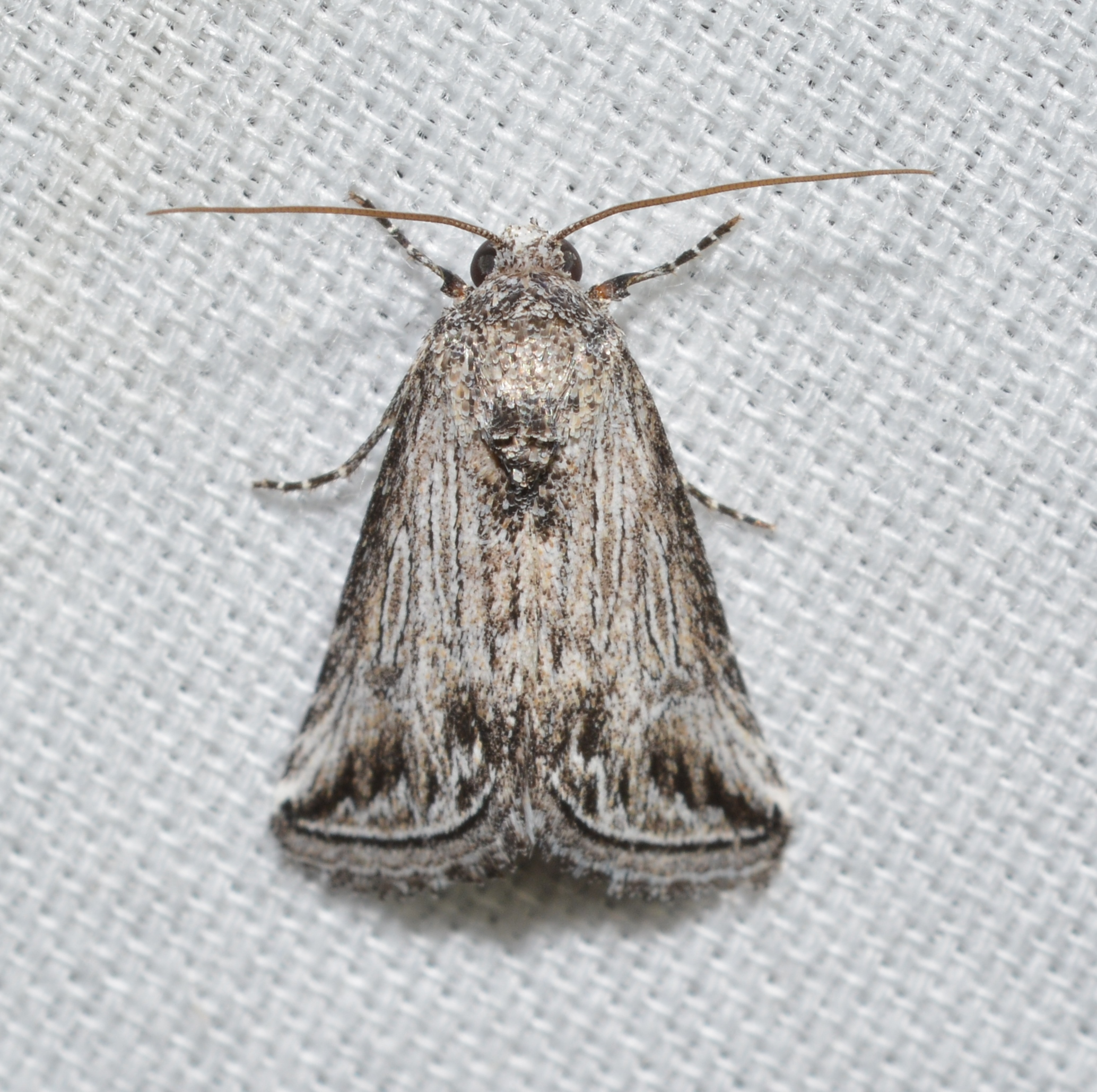
Oxycnemis gracillinea

== Genera ==
- Acopa Harvey, 1875
- Airamia Barnes & Benjamin, 1926
- Aleptina Dyar, 1902
- Anycteola Barnes & Benjamin, 1929
- Apsaphida Franclemont, 1973
- Brachionycha Hübner, 1819
- Copibryophila Smith, 1900
- Copivaleria Grote, 1883 (sallow moths)
- Crimona Smith, 1902
- Cropia Walker, 1858
- Emarginea Guenée, 1852
- Euamiana Barnes & Benjamin, 1927
- Eviridemas Barnes & Benjamin, 1929
- Feralia Grote, 1874
- Fota Grote, 1882
- Gloanna Nye, 1975
- Leucocnemis Hampson, 1908
- Lythrodes Smith, 1903
- Metaponpneumata Möschler, 1890
- Miracavira Franclemont, 1937
- Nacopa Barnes & Benjamin, 1924
- Nocloa Smith, 1906
- Oslaria Dyar, 1904
- Oxycnemis Grote, 1882
- Paramiana Barnes & Benjamin, 1924
- Paratrachea Hampson, 1908
- Petalumaria Buckett & Bauer, 1968
- Pleromella Dyar, 1921
- Policocnemis Benjamin, 1932
- Prothrinax Hampson, 1908
- Provia Barnes & McDunnough, 1910
- Psaphida Walker, 1865
- Pseudocopivaleria Buckett & Bauer, 1966
- Redingtonia Barnes & McDunnough, 1912
- Ruacodes Hampson, 1908
- Sexserrata Barnes & Benjamin, 1922
- Supralathosea Barnes & Benjamin, 1924
- Triocnemis Grote, 1881
- Unciella Troubridge, 2008
- Viridemas Smith, 1908
- Walterella Dyar, 1921
