= Unciella =

Scientific classification
- Domain: Eukaryota
- Kingdom: Animalia
- Phylum: Arthropoda
- Class: Insecta
- Order: Lepidoptera
- Superfamily: Noctuoidea
- Family: Noctuidae
- Subtribe: Triocnemidina
- Genus: Unciella; Troubridge, 2008

Genus of moths

Unciella is a genus of moths of the family Noctuidae.

== Species ==
- Unciella flagrantis (Smith, 1893)
- Unciella primula (Barnes & McDunnough, 1918)
