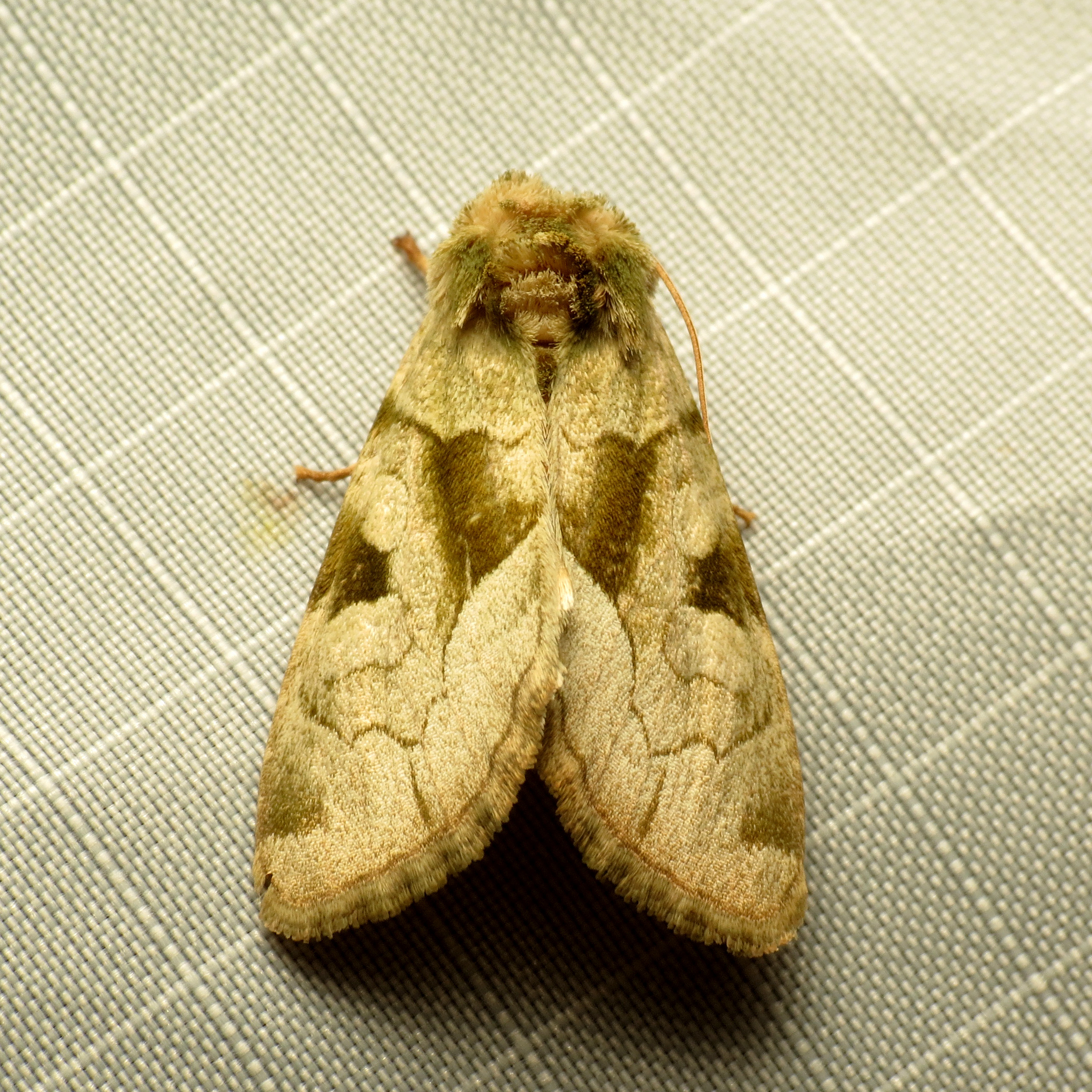
- Oslaria viridifera

Scientific classification
- Kingdom: Animalia
- Phylum: Arthropoda
- Class: Insecta
- Order: Lepidoptera
- Superfamily: Noctuoidea
- Family: Noctuidae
- Subtribe: Nocloina
- Genus: Oslaria; Dyar, 1904

= Oslaria =

Genus of moths

Oslaria is a genus of moths of the family Noctuidae. the genus was erected by Harrison Gray Dyar Jr. in 1904.

== Species ==
- Oslaria viridifera (Grote, [1883]) Arizona
- Oslaria pura Barnes & McDunnough, 1911 Arizona
- Oslaria viridescens (Schaus, 1904) Mexico
