= Aleptina semiatra =

Scientific classification
- Domain: Eukaryota
- Kingdom: Animalia
- Phylum: Arthropoda
- Class: Insecta
- Order: Lepidoptera
- Superfamily: Noctuoidea
- Family: Noctuidae
- Tribe: Psaphidini
- Subtribe: Triocnemidina
- Genus: Aleptina
- Species: A. semiatra

Binomial name
- Aleptina semiatra (Smith, 1902)

Species of moth

Aleptina semiatra is a species of moth in the family Noctuidae (the owlet moths). It is found in North America.

The MONA or Hodges number for Aleptina semiatra is 9165.
