= Axenos =

Axenos or Axenus (ancient Greek: Ἄξενος or Ἄξεινος) may refer to:

- Axenos, earlier name of the Achelous River, in Greece
- Axenos, ancient name of the Black Sea
- Axenus, a genus of moths of the family Noctuidae
