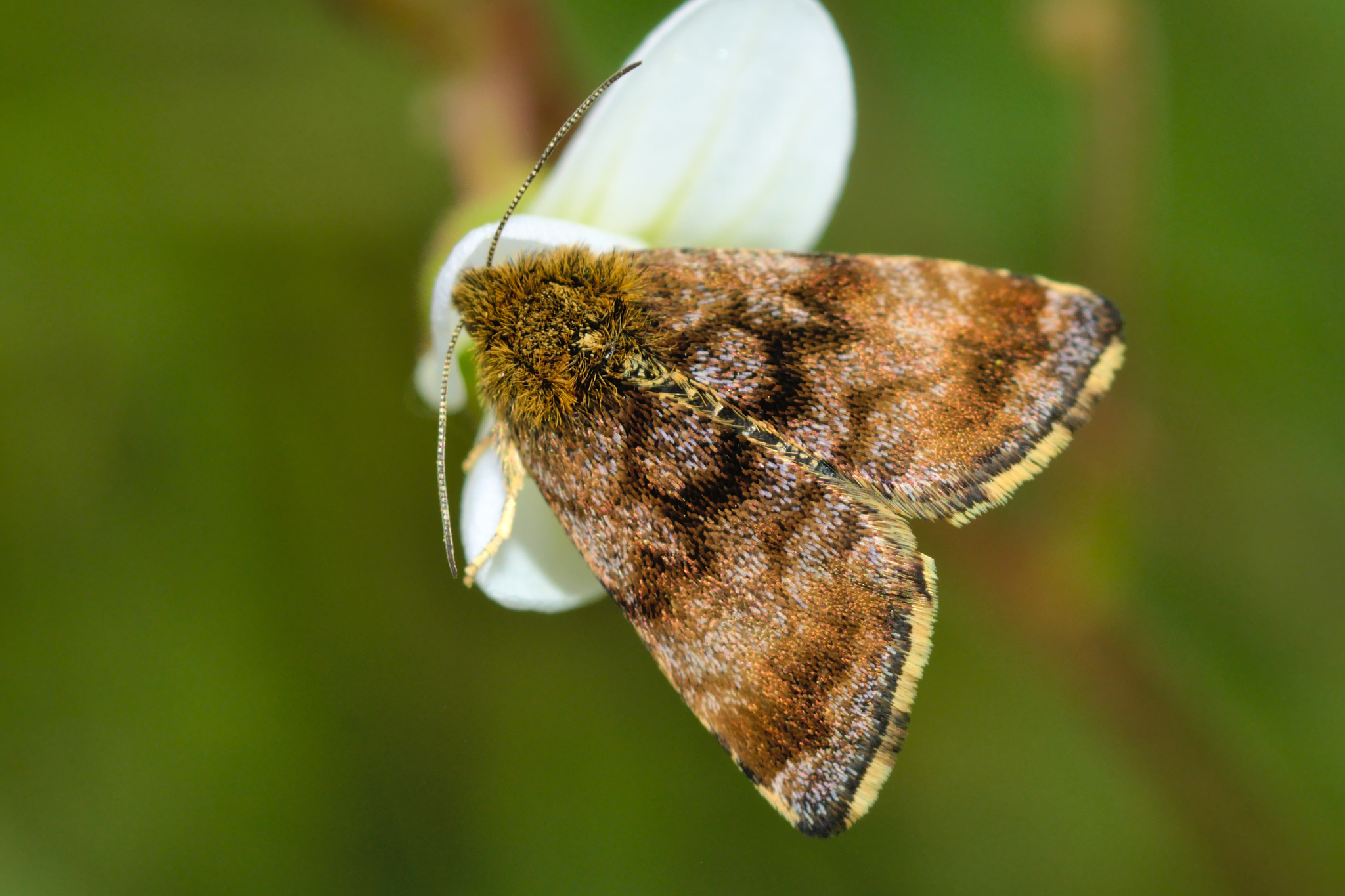
- Panemeria tenebrata, small yellow underwing, Belgium

Scientific classification
- Kingdom: Animalia
- Phylum: Arthropoda
- Clade: Pancrustacea
- Class: Insecta
- Order: Lepidoptera
- Superfamily: Noctuoidea
- Family: Noctuidae
- Subfamily: Metoponiinae
- Genus: Panemeria; Hübner, 1823

= Panemeria =

Genus of moths

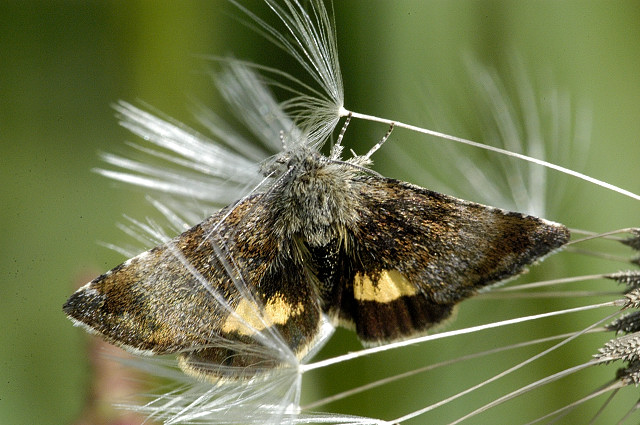
Panemeria tenebrata

Panemeria is a genus of owlet moths in the family Noctuidae.

== Species ==
These four species belong to the genus Panemeria:

- Panemeria lateralis
- Panemeria tenebrata (Scopoli, 1763) (small yellow underwing) (Europe)
- Panemeria tenebromorpha Rakosy, Hentscholek & Huber, 1996
- Panemeria viehmanni
