= Acopa carina =

Scientific classification
- Domain: Eukaryota
- Kingdom: Animalia
- Phylum: Arthropoda
- Class: Insecta
- Order: Lepidoptera
- Superfamily: Noctuoidea
- Family: Noctuidae
- Tribe: Psaphidini
- Subtribe: Triocnemidina
- Genus: Acopa
- Species: A. carina

Binomial name
- Acopa carina Harvey, 1875

Species of moth

Acopa carina is a species of moth in the family Noctuidae (the owlet moths). It is found in North America.

The MONA or Hodges number for Acopa carina is 9825.
