= Leucocnemis perfundis =

Scientific classification
- Domain: Eukaryota
- Kingdom: Animalia
- Phylum: Arthropoda
- Class: Insecta
- Order: Lepidoptera
- Superfamily: Noctuoidea
- Family: Noctuidae
- Tribe: Psaphidini
- Subtribe: Triocnemidina
- Genus: Leucocnemis
- Species: L. perfundis

Binomial name
- Leucocnemis perfundis (Smith, 1894)

Species of moth

Leucocnemis perfundis is a species of moth in the family Noctuidae (the owlet moths). It is found in North America.

The MONA or Hodges number for Leucocnemis perfundis is 10049.
