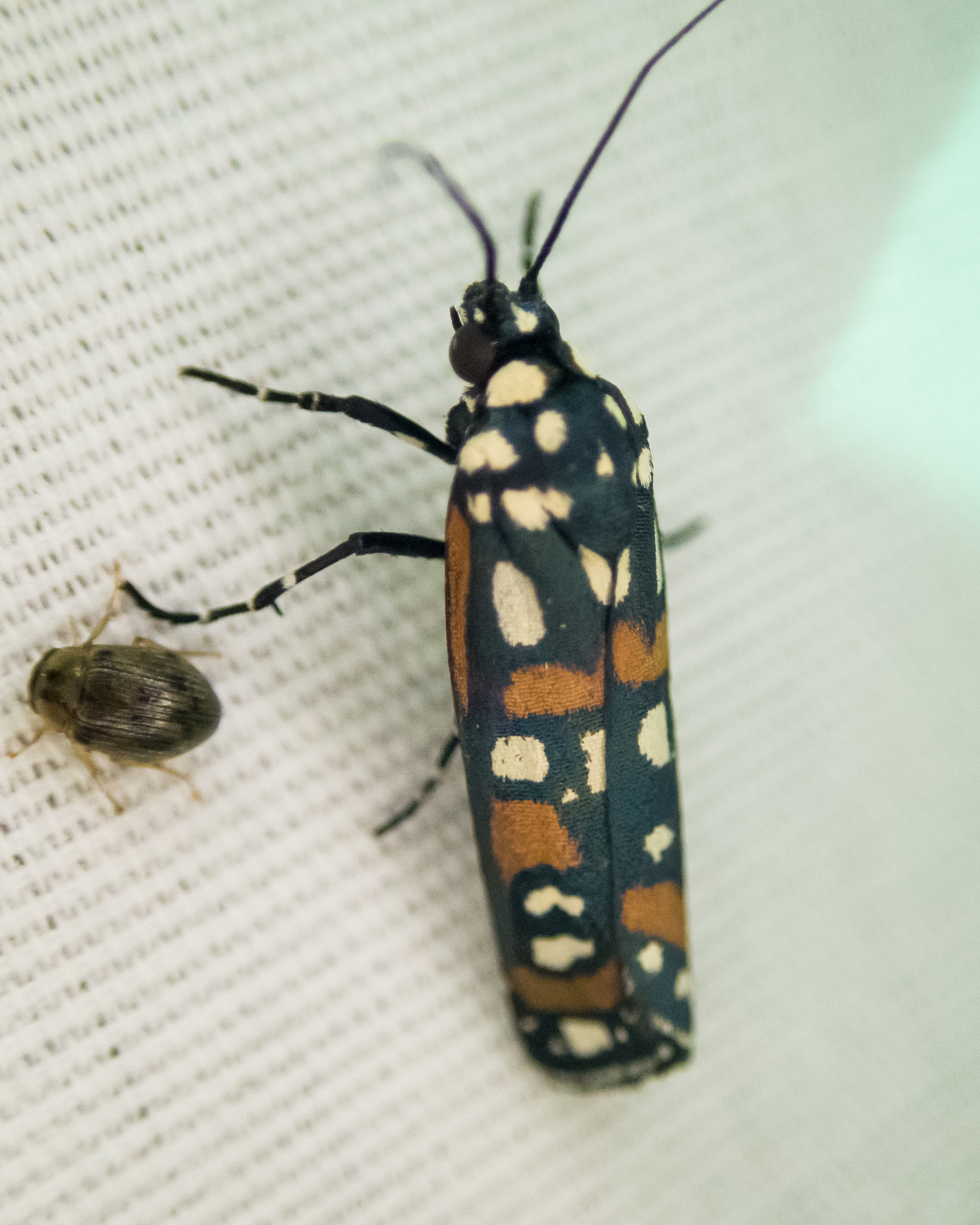
- Cydosia aurivitta, Texas

Scientific classification
- Domain: Eukaryota
- Kingdom: Animalia
- Phylum: Arthropoda
- Class: Insecta
- Order: Lepidoptera
- Superfamily: Noctuoidea
- Family: Noctuidae
- Subfamily: Metoponiinae; Herrich-Schäffer, 1851

= Metoponiinae =

Subfamily of insects

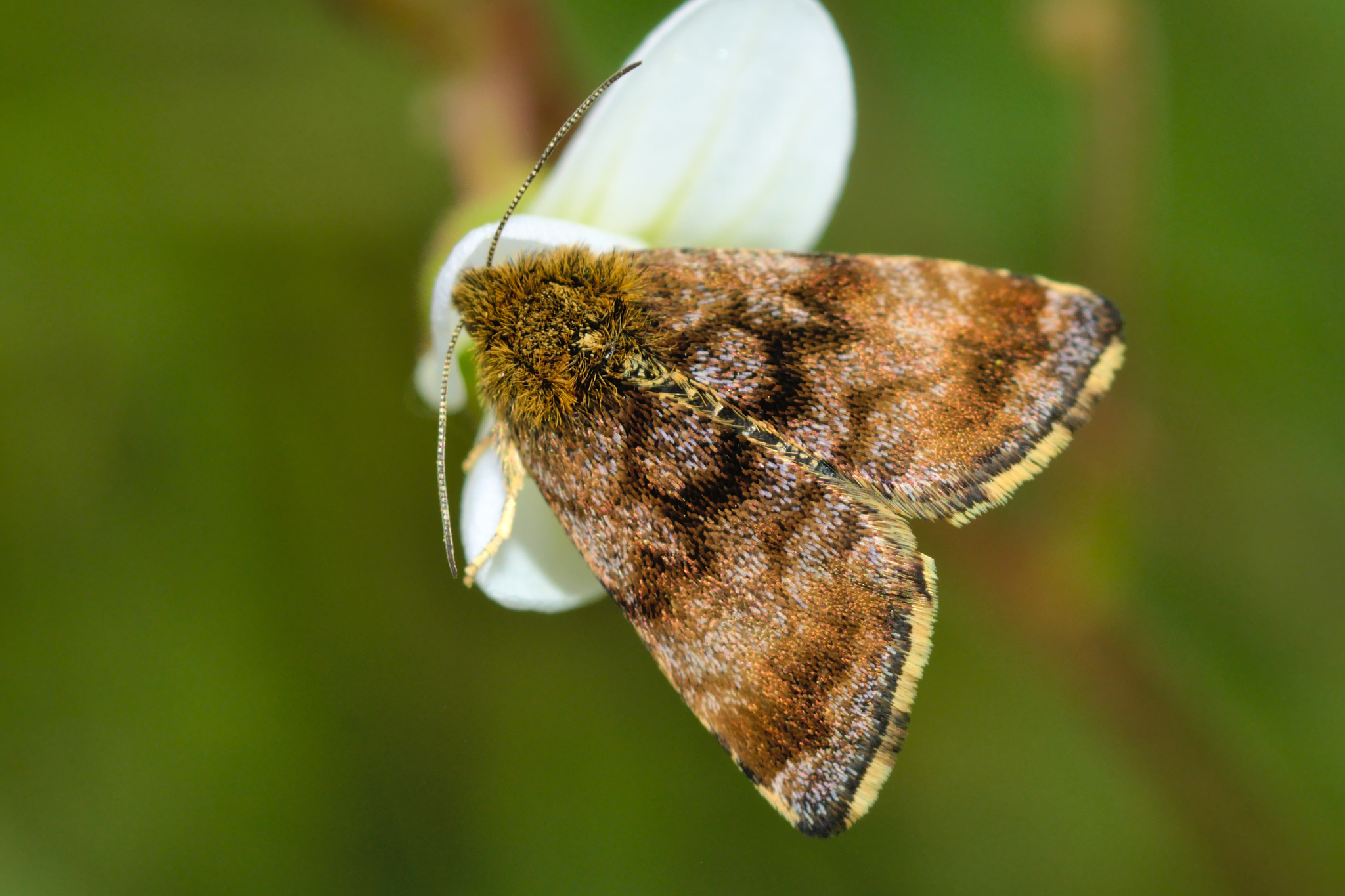
Panemeria tenebrata, Belgium

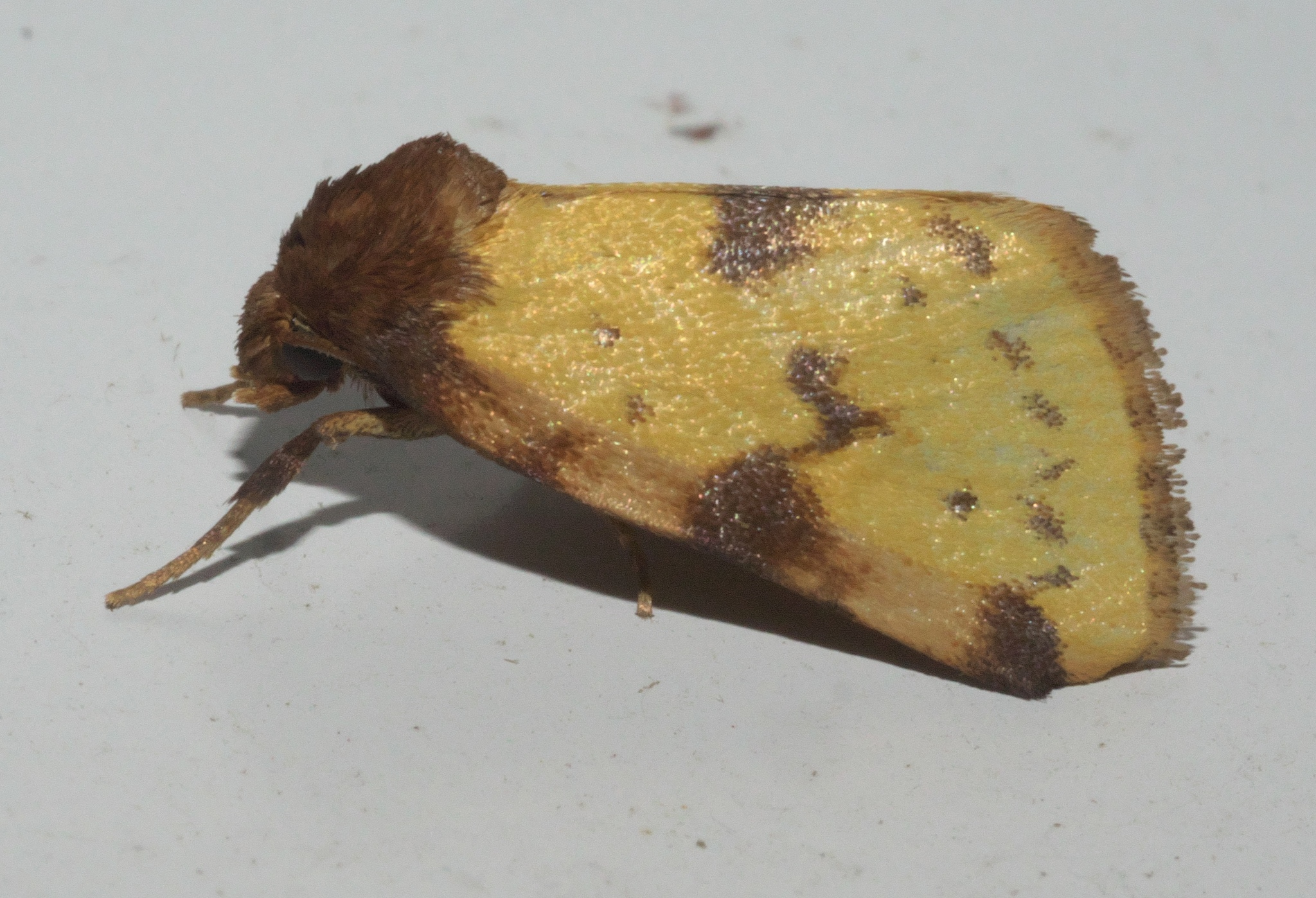
Azenia obtusa, Oklahoma

Metoponiinae is a subfamily of owlet moths in the family Noctuidae. There are about 16 genera and more than 70 described species in Metoponiinae.

== Genera ==
These 16 genera belong to the subfamily Metoponiinae:

- Aegle Hübner, 1823
- Axenus Grote, 1873
- Azenia Grote, 1882
- Cydosia Duncan & Westwood, 1841
- Epharmottomena John, 1909
- Flammona Walker, 1863
- Haemerosia Boisduval, 1840
- Metaponpneumata Möschler, 1890
- Metopoplus Christoph, 1893
- Mycteroplus Herrich-Schaffer, 1850
- Panemeria Hübner, 1823
- Pinacoplus Hampson, 1910
- Proschaliphora Hampson, 1901
- Sexserrata Barnes & Benjamin, 1922
- Synthymia Hübner, 1823
- Tristyla Smith, 1893
