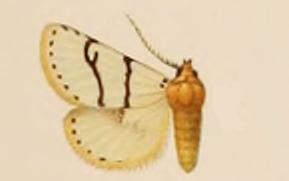

Scientific classification
- Domain: Eukaryota
- Kingdom: Animalia
- Phylum: Arthropoda
- Class: Insecta
- Order: Lepidoptera
- Superfamily: Noctuoidea
- Family: Noctuidae
- Genus: Proschaliphora
- Species: P. butti

Binomial name
- Proschaliphora butti Rothschild, 1910

Synonyms
- Proschaliphora bulti Janse, 1917

= Proschaliphora butti =

Species of moth

Proschaliphora butti is a moth of the subfamily Arctiinae first described by Rothschild in 1910. It is found in South Africa.
