= Aleptina junctimacula =

Scientific classification
- Kingdom: Animalia
- Phylum: Arthropoda
- Clade: Pancrustacea
- Class: Insecta
- Order: Lepidoptera
- Superfamily: Noctuoidea
- Family: Noctuidae
- Genus: Aleptina
- Species: A. junctimacula

Binomial name
- Aleptina junctimacula A. Blanchard, 1984

Species of moth

Aleptina junctimacula is a moth in the family Noctuidae (the owlet moths). It was described by André Blanchard in 1984 and is found in North America.

The MONA or Hodges number for Aleptina junctimacula is 9071.1.
