= Proschaliphora citricostata =

Scientific classification
- Kingdom: Animalia
- Phylum: Arthropoda
- Class: Insecta
- Order: Lepidoptera
- Superfamily: Noctuoidea
- Family: Noctuidae
- Genus: Proschaliphora
- Species: P. citricostata

Binomial name
- Proschaliphora citricostata Hampson, 1901

Species of moth

Proschaliphora citricostata is a moth in the subfamily Arctiinae. It was described by George Hampson in 1901. It is found in Kenya.
