= Leucocnemis =

Scientific classification
- Kingdom: Animalia
- Phylum: Arthropoda
- Class: Insecta
- Order: Lepidoptera
- Superfamily: Noctuoidea
- Family: Noctuidae
- Subtribe: Triocnemidina
- Genus: Leucocnemis; Hampson, 1908

Genus of moths

Leucocnemis is a genus of moths of the family Noctuidae. The genus was erected by George Hampson in 1908.

== Species ==
- Leucocnemis nivalis (J. B. Smith, 1894)
- Leucocnemis obscurella Barnes & McDunnough, 1916
- Leucocnemis perfundis (J. B. Smith, 1894)
- Leucocnemis variabilis Barnes & McDunnough, 1918
