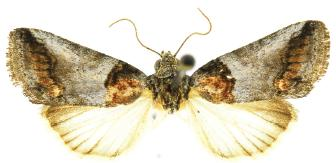
- Male
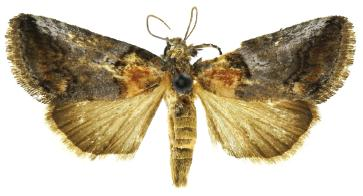
- Female

Scientific classification
- Kingdom: Animalia
- Phylum: Arthropoda
- Class: Insecta
- Order: Lepidoptera
- Superfamily: Noctuoidea
- Family: Noctuidae
- Genus: Aleptina
- Species: A. clinopetes

Binomial name
- Aleptina clinopetes (Dyar, 1920)

Synonyms
- Bryocodia clinopetes Dyar, 1920

= Aleptina clinopetes =

Species of moth

Aleptina clinopetes is a moth of the family Noctuidae. It is found in southern Arizona and Mexico.
