= Mycteroplus =

Scientific classification
- Domain: Eukaryota
- Kingdom: Animalia
- Phylum: Arthropoda
- Class: Insecta
- Order: Lepidoptera
- Superfamily: Noctuoidea
- Family: Noctuidae
- Subfamily: Metoponiinae
- Genus: Mycteroplus; Herrich-Schaffer, 1850

Genus of moths

Mycteroplus is a genus of moths of the family Noctuidae.

== Species ==
- Mycteroplus puniceago (Boisduval, 1840)
