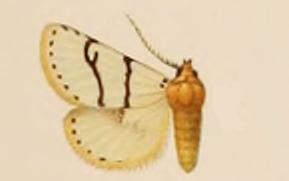
- Proschaliphora butti

Scientific classification
- Kingdom: Animalia
- Phylum: Arthropoda
- Class: Insecta
- Order: Lepidoptera
- Superfamily: Noctuoidea
- Family: Noctuidae
- Subfamily: Metoponiinae
- Genus: Proschaliphora; Hampson, 1901

= Proschaliphora =

Genus of moths

Proschaliphora is a genus of moths in the family Noctuidae.

== Species ==
- Proschaliphora albida Hampson, 1909
- Proschaliphora aurata Kühne, 2010
- Proschaliphora butti Rothschild, 1910
- Proschaliphora citricostata Hampson, 1901
- Proschaliphora lineata Kühne, 2010
- Proschaliphora minima Kühne, 2010
