= Proschaliphora lineata =

Scientific classification
- Domain: Eukaryota
- Kingdom: Animalia
- Phylum: Arthropoda
- Class: Insecta
- Order: Lepidoptera
- Superfamily: Noctuoidea
- Family: Noctuidae
- Genus: Proschaliphora
- Species: P. lineata

Binomial name
- Proschaliphora lineata Kühne, 2010

Species of moth

Proschaliphora lineata is a moth in the subfamily Arctiinae. It was described by Lars Kühne in 2010. It is found in Namibia.
