= Aegle subflava =

Scientific classification
- Domain: Eukaryota
- Kingdom: Animalia
- Phylum: Arthropoda
- Class: Insecta
- Order: Lepidoptera
- Superfamily: Noctuoidea
- Family: Noctuidae
- Genus: Aegle
- Species: A. subflava

Binomial name
- Aegle subflava (Erschoff, 1874)

Synonyms
- Metoponia subflava Erschoff, 1874

Species of moth

Aegle subflava is a moth of the family Noctuidae. It was described by Nikolay Grigoryevich Erschoff in 1874 and is found in Kazakhstan, Turkmenistan and Tajikistan.
