= Sexserrata =

Scientific classification
- Domain: Eukaryota
- Kingdom: Animalia
- Phylum: Arthropoda
- Class: Insecta
- Order: Lepidoptera
- Superfamily: Noctuoidea
- Family: Noctuidae
- Subfamily: Metoponiinae
- Genus: Sexserrata; Barnes & Benjamin, 1922
- Species: S. hampsoni

Binomial name
- Sexserrata hampsoni Barnes & Benjamin, 1922

Genus of moths

Sexserrata is a monotypic moth genus of the family Noctuidae. Its only species, Sexserrata hampsoni, is found in the US state of California. Both the genus and species were first described by William Barnes and Foster Hendrickson Benjamin in 1922.
