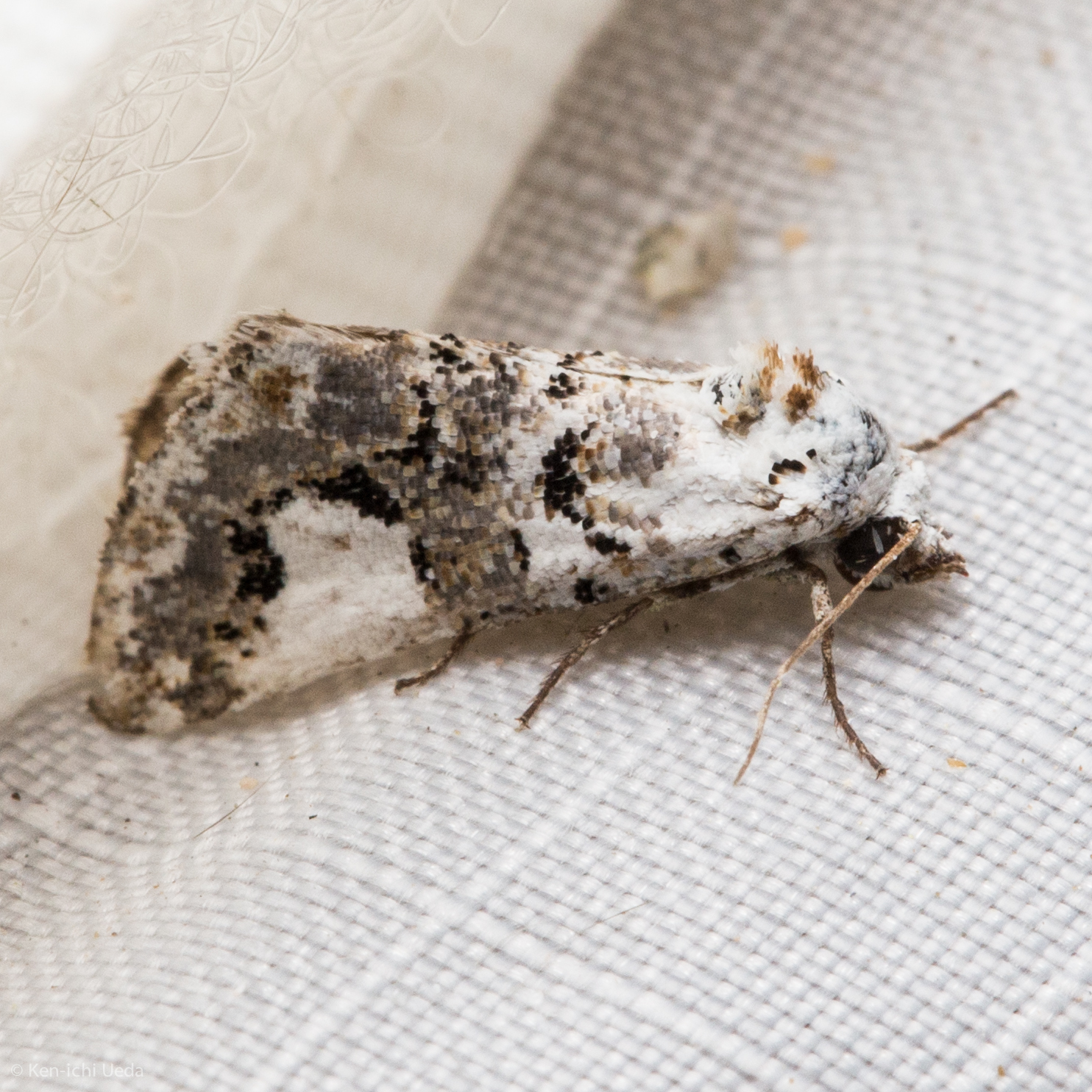

Scientific classification
- Domain: Eukaryota
- Kingdom: Animalia
- Phylum: Arthropoda
- Class: Insecta
- Order: Lepidoptera
- Superfamily: Noctuoidea
- Family: Noctuidae
- Subfamily: Metoponiinae
- Genus: Tristyla; J. B. Smith, 1893
- Species: T. alboplagiata

Binomial name
- Tristyla alboplagiata Smith, 1893

= Tristyla =

Tristyla alboplagiata

Genus of moths

Tristyla is a monotypic genus of moths in the family Noctuidae. Its only species, Tristyla alboplagiata, is found in the US states of California and Arizona. Both the genus and species were first described by John Bernhardt Smith in 1893.
