= Aegle hedychroa =

Scientific classification
- Domain: Eukaryota
- Kingdom: Animalia
- Phylum: Arthropoda
- Class: Insecta
- Order: Lepidoptera
- Superfamily: Noctuoidea
- Family: Noctuidae
- Genus: Aegle
- Species: A. hedychroa

Binomial name
- Aegle hedychroa (Turner, 1904)

Synonyms
- Megalodes hedychroa Turner, 1904

Species of moth

Aegle hedychroa is a moth of the family Noctuidae. It is found in Australia.
