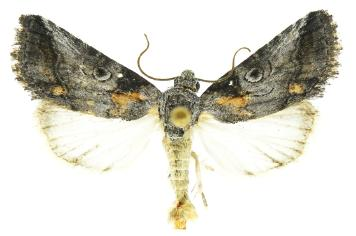
- Male
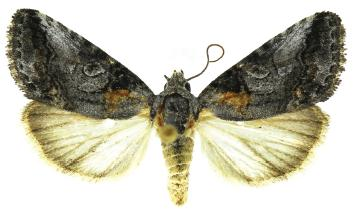
- Female

Scientific classification
- Domain: Eukaryota
- Kingdom: Animalia
- Phylum: Arthropoda
- Class: Insecta
- Order: Lepidoptera
- Superfamily: Noctuoidea
- Family: Noctuidae
- Genus: Aleptina
- Species: A. inca

Binomial name
- Aleptina inca Dyar, 1902

Synonyms
- Paracretonia inca; Aleptina inca texana Barnes & McDunnough, 1913

= Aleptina inca =

Species of moth

Aleptina inca is a moth of the family Noctuidae. It is found from south-eastern California east to southern Arizona and western Texas. It is also found in Baja California.

The wingspan is about 19 mm. Adults are on wing from May to October in multiple generations in western Texas.
