= Haemerosia =

Scientific classification
- Domain: Eukaryota
- Kingdom: Animalia
- Phylum: Arthropoda
- Class: Insecta
- Order: Lepidoptera
- Superfamily: Noctuoidea
- Family: Noctuidae
- Subfamily: Metoponiinae
- Genus: Haemerosia; Boisduval, 1840

Synonyms
- Haemassia (Acronyctinae) Hampson, 1908; Gyrohypsoma Staudinger, 1888; Haemassia (Acronyctinae) Hampson, 1909

Genus of moths

Haemerosia is a genus of moths of the family Noctuidae. The genus was erected by Jean Baptiste Boisduval in 1840.

== Species ==
- Haemerosia ionochlora Ronkay, Varga & Hreblay, 1998 Turkmenistan

Subgenus Haemerosia

- Haemerosia renalis (Hübner, [1813]) south-eastern Europe, Near East, Turkey, Iraq, western Iran
- Haemerosia albicomma Ronkay, Varga & Hreblay, 1998 Turkmenistan (Kopet Dagh)
- Haemerosia vassilininei A. Bang-Haas, 1912 Greece, Bulgaria, Caucasus, Iran

Subgenus Gyrohypsoma

- Haemerosia sterrha (Staudinger, 1888)
