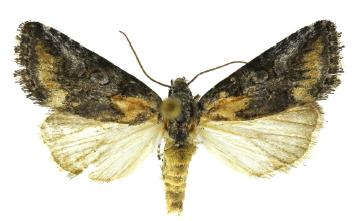
- Aleptina arenaria

Scientific classification
- Kingdom: Animalia
- Phylum: Arthropoda
- Class: Insecta
- Order: Lepidoptera
- Superfamily: Noctuoidea
- Family: Noctuidae
- Subtribe: Triocnemidina
- Genus: Aleptina; Dyar, 1902

Synonyms
- Paracretonia Dyar, 1912

= Aleptina =

Genus of moths

Aleptina is a genus of moths of the family Noctuidae. The genus was erected by Harrison Gray Dyar Jr. in 1902.

== Species ==
- Aleptina aleptivoides (Barnes & McDunnough, 1912)
- Aleptina arenaria Metzler & Forbes, 2011
- Aleptina clinopetes (Dyar, 1920)
- Aleptina inca Dyar, 1902
- Aleptina junctimacula Todd, Blanchard & Poole, 1984
- Aleptina semiatra (Smith, 1902)
