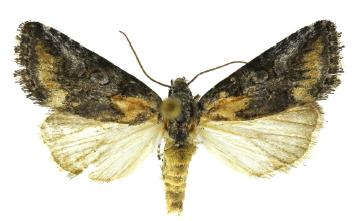
- Male
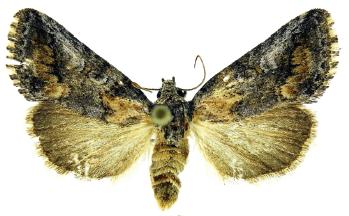
- Female

Scientific classification
- Kingdom: Animalia
- Phylum: Arthropoda
- Clade: Pancrustacea
- Class: Insecta
- Order: Lepidoptera
- Superfamily: Noctuoidea
- Family: Noctuidae
- Genus: Aleptina
- Species: A. arenaria

Binomial name
- Aleptina arenaria Metzler & Forbes, 2011

= Aleptina arenaria =

Species of moth

Aleptina arenaria is a moth of the family Noctuidae. It is only known from the White Sands National Park, Otero County, New Mexico.

The length of the forewings is 10 mm for males and females. Adults are grey with normal noctuid transverse markings and spots.

== Etymology ==
Gypsum sand is the substrate of the white dune field at White Sands National Park. Arena means sand in Latin. The Latin suffix -aria means connected with something. The specific epithet of this species, arenaria calls attention to the specialized sandy habitat where Aleptina arenaria was discovered.
