= Aleptina aleptivoides =

Scientific classification
- Kingdom: Animalia
- Phylum: Arthropoda
- Clade: Pancrustacea
- Class: Insecta
- Order: Lepidoptera
- Superfamily: Noctuoidea
- Family: Noctuidae
- Genus: Aleptina
- Species: A. aleptivoides

Binomial name
- Aleptina aleptivoides (Barnes & McDunnough, 1912)

Species of moth

Aleptina aleptivoides is a species of moth in the family Noctuidae (the owlet moths) first described by William Barnes and James Halliday McDunnough in 1912. It is found in North America.
