= Proschaliphora minima =

Scientific classification
- Kingdom: Animalia
- Phylum: Arthropoda
- Class: Insecta
- Order: Lepidoptera
- Superfamily: Noctuoidea
- Family: Noctuidae
- Genus: Proschaliphora
- Species: P. minima

Binomial name
- Proschaliphora minima Kühne, 2010

Species of moth

Proschaliphora minima is a moth in the subfamily Arctiinae. It was described by Lars Kühne in 2010. It is found in Namibia.
