= Acopa perpallida =

Scientific classification
- Domain: Eukaryota
- Kingdom: Animalia
- Phylum: Arthropoda
- Class: Insecta
- Order: Lepidoptera
- Superfamily: Noctuoidea
- Family: Noctuidae
- Genus: Acopa
- Species: A. perpallida

Binomial name
- Acopa perpallida Grote, 1878

Species of moth

Acopa perpallida is a species of moth in the family Noctuidae (the owlet moths). It is found in North America.

The MONA or Hodges number for Acopa perpallida is 9826.

The moth is entirely white in color with dark brown colored patterns on its wings. The moths are found in the deserts of Southern Oregon and Idaho and also in eastern British Columbia.
