= Pinacoplus =

Scientific classification
- Kingdom: Animalia
- Phylum: Arthropoda
- Class: Insecta
- Order: Lepidoptera
- Superfamily: Noctuoidea
- Family: Noctuidae
- Subfamily: Metoponiinae
- Genus: Pinacoplus; Hampson, 1910
- Species: P. didymogramma

Binomial name
- Pinacoplus didymogramma Erschoff, 1874

Genus of moths

Pinacoplus is a genus of owlet moths in the family Noctuidae. This genus has a single species, Pinacoplus didymogramma.
