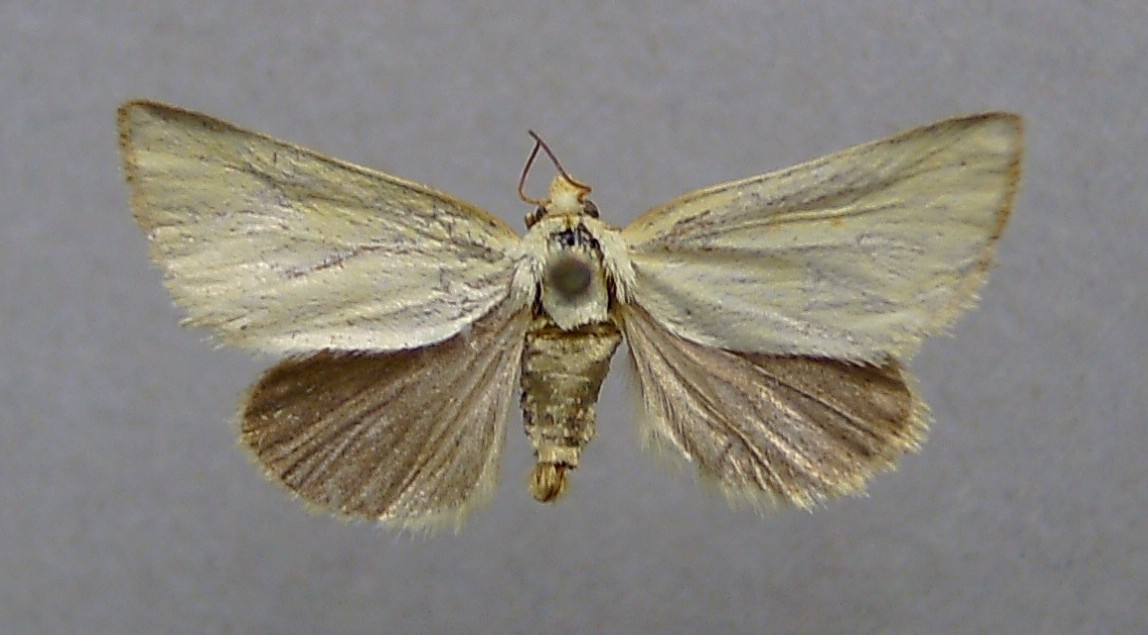

Scientific classification
- Kingdom: Animalia
- Phylum: Arthropoda
- Clade: Pancrustacea
- Class: Insecta
- Order: Lepidoptera
- Superfamily: Noctuoidea
- Family: Noctuidae
- Genus: Aegle
- Species: A. koekeritziana

Binomial name
- Aegle koekeritziana (Hübner, 1799)

Synonyms
- Tortrix koekeritziana Hübner, 1799; Anthophila flavida Ochsenheimer, 1816; Aegle flavida (Ochsenheimer, 1816)

= Aegle koekeritziana =

Species of moth

Aegle koekeritziana is a moth of the family Noctuidae. It is found on the Russian plain and in Hungary and Moldova. It is also present in Turkey, the Caucasus and Transcaucasia.

The wingspan is 20–26 mm. Adults are on wing from May to the end of August.

The larvae feed on Delphinium species. Pupation takes place in a spinning.

== Literature ==
- Walter Forster & Theodor A. Wohlfahrt: Die Schmetterlinge Mitteleuropas - Bd.IV Eulen (Noctuidae), Franckh´sche Verlagsbuchhandlung, Stuttgart 1971
