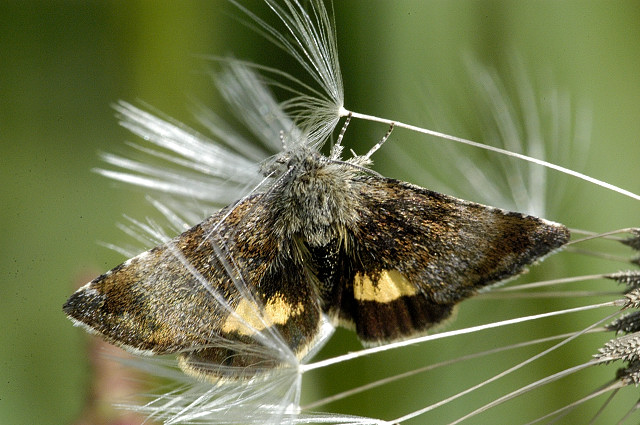

Scientific classification
- Domain: Eukaryota
- Kingdom: Animalia
- Phylum: Arthropoda
- Class: Insecta
- Order: Lepidoptera
- Superfamily: Noctuoidea
- Family: Noctuidae
- Genus: Panemeria
- Species: P. tenebrata

Binomial name
- Panemeria tenebrata (Scopoli, 1763)

= Panemeria tenebrata =

Small yellow underwing

Species of moth

Panemeria tenebrata, the small yellow underwing, is a moth of the family Noctuidae. The species was first described by Giovanni Antonio Scopoli in his 1763 Entomologia Carniolica. It is found in Europe but is missing in northern Scandinavia, in Portugal, in central and southern Spain, as well as on most Mediterranean islands, except Sicily. In the east, the range extends to the Ural Mountains, but the east distribution limits are still insufficiently known. Occurrence in Asia Minor is uncertain, but it is known from Jordan and Israel.

== Technical description and variation ==
The wingspan is 19–22 mm. Forewing dark fuscous, varied with red brown and with a sprinkling of pale grey scales; inner and outer lines indistinctly darker; a dentate, cloudy dark fuscous median shade; a darker shade precedes and defines the subterminal hue; hindwing blackish, with a deep yellow outer fascia not reaching inner margin; in the ab. obscura Spul. the black borders of the hindwing are wider and the white band smaller.

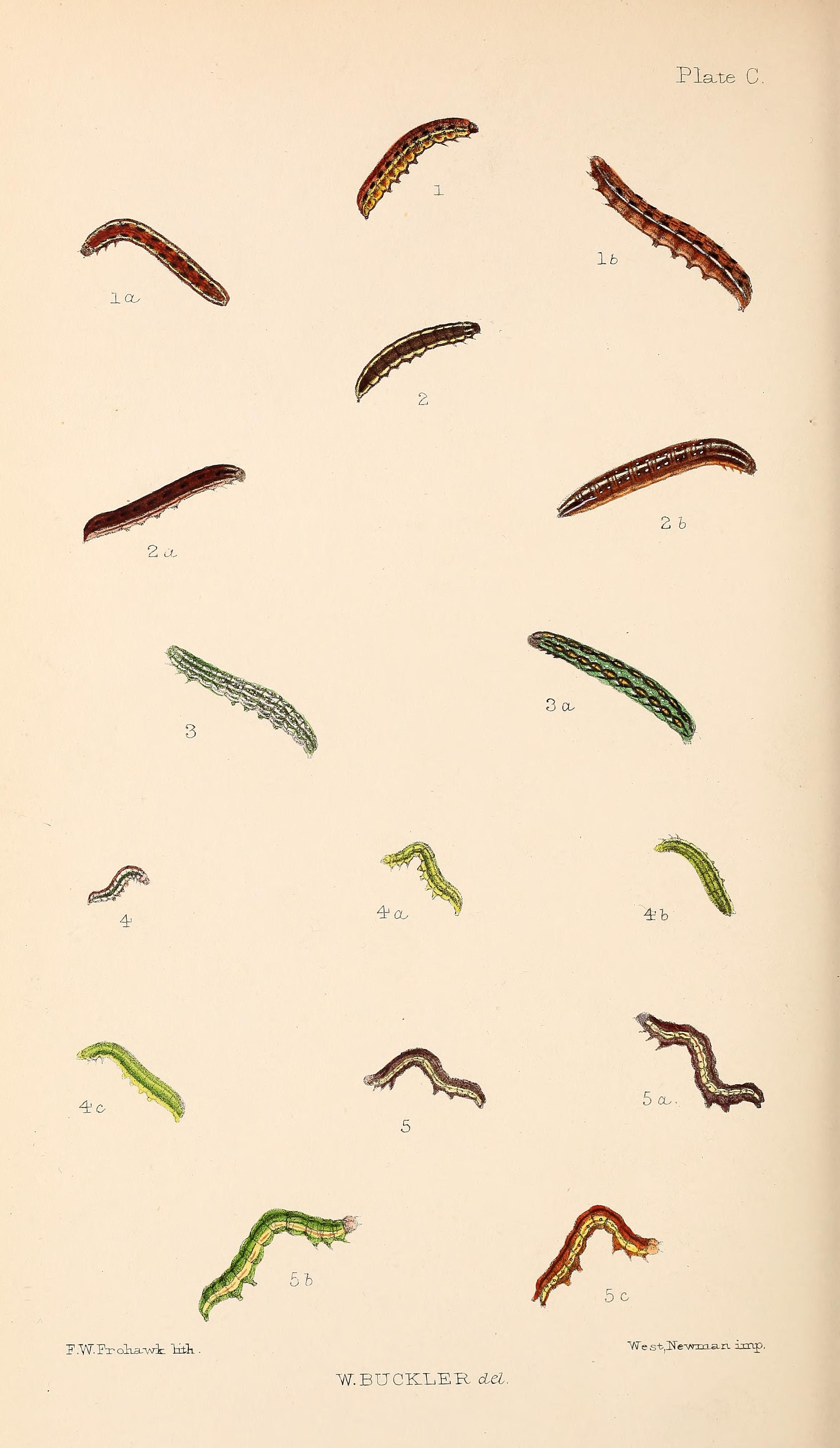
4, 4a,4b, 4c larvae in various stages of growth

== Biology ==
The moth flies from April to July depending on the location. It prefers sunny weather.

Larva light green; dorsal line deep green; subdorsal lines whitish, edged with darker; spiracular line more yellowish, edged with dark green above: head pale green. The larvae feed on the flowers and seeds of Cerastium and Stellaria.
