= Nacopa bistrigata =

Scientific classification
- Domain: Eukaryota
- Kingdom: Animalia
- Phylum: Arthropoda
- Class: Insecta
- Order: Lepidoptera
- Superfamily: Noctuoidea
- Family: Noctuidae
- Genus: Nacopa
- Species: N. bistrigata

Binomial name
- Nacopa bistrigata (Barnes & McDunnough, 1918)

Species of moth

Nacopa bistrigata is a species of moth in the family Noctuidae (the owlet moths). It was first described by William Barnes and James Halliday McDunnough in 1918 and it is found in North America.

The MONA or Hodges number for Nacopa bistrigata is 9827.
