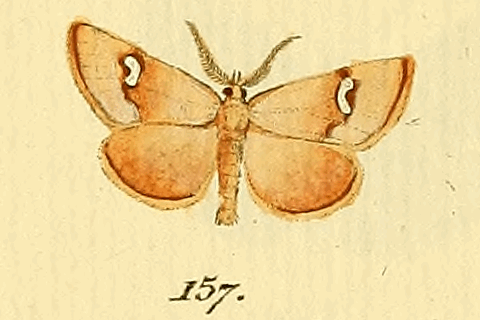

Scientific classification
- Kingdom: Animalia
- Phylum: Arthropoda
- Clade: Pancrustacea
- Class: Insecta
- Order: Lepidoptera
- Superfamily: Noctuoidea
- Family: Noctuidae
- Genus: Haemerosia
- Species: H. renalis

Binomial name
- Haemerosia renalis (Hübner, 1813)

Synonyms
- Pyralis renalis Hübner, [1813]; Haemerosia renifera Boisduval, 1840

= Haemerosia renalis =

Species of moth

Haemerosia renalis is a moth of the family Noctuidae. It was described by Jacob Hübner in 1813. It is found in Spain, France, Italy, Sicily, Bosnia and Herzegovina, Serbia, Croatia, Slovenia, Bulgaria, North Macedonia and Greece. It has also been recorded from the Near East.

== Description ==
Warren states.R. renigera Hbn. (= dumosa Donz.[Dichagyris renigera Hübner, [1808] ]) (13 e). Forewing greyish ochreous, thickly dusted with fuscous or grey, especially the space between outer and submarginal lines; markings obscure; lines marked by dark spots on costa; stigmata faintly yellowish; hindwing greyish fuscous.A south European species, found in Spain, France, Italy, Switzerland, Carinthia, Bosnia, and Hungary; also in Armenia, Asia Minor, Syria, Persia, Turkestan, and Mongolia: the Asiatic forms differ in coloration from the European; they have been separated by Staudinger as ab. turana Stgr.[Dichagyris forficula ssp. turana Staudinger, 1891], which is pale ocbreous, with the grey tinge less conspicuous: ab. intermedia Stgr. (13 e),[Dichagyris forficula Eversmann, 1851] which is dark violaceous grey with markings obscure; ab. erubescens Stgr.[Dichagyris erubescens Staudinger, 1891, in which the ochreous deepens into fulvous or reddish, and the markings become distinct; and ab. funebris [Dichagyris renigera Hübner, [1808]}Stgr.(13 e), which is leaden grey; but erubescens and intermedia may well form a species apart, as Staudinger himself suggested.

== Biology ==
The larvae feed on the flowers and seeds of Chondrilla juncea, Lactuca sativa and Lactuca serriola.
