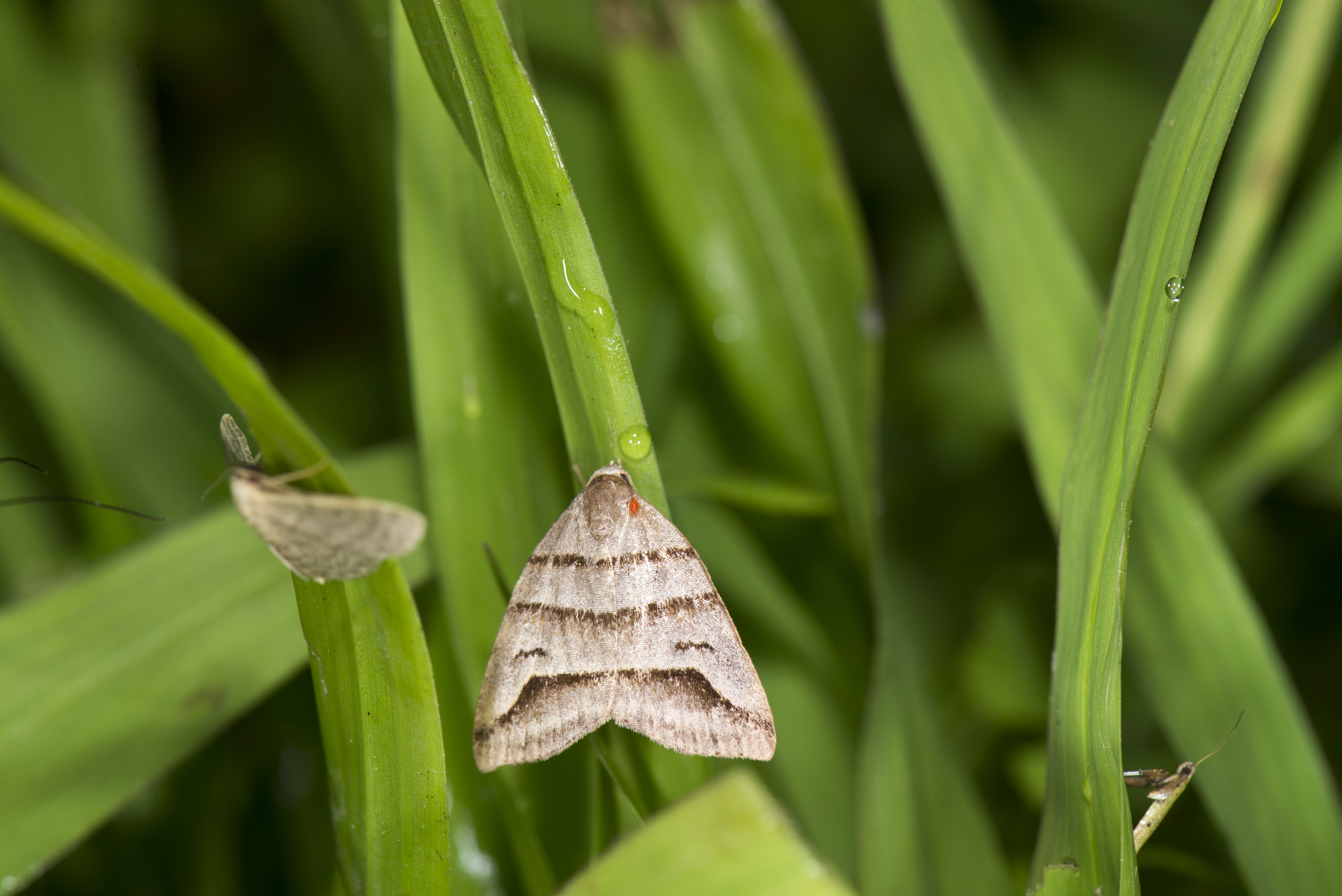
- Flammona trilineata

Scientific classification
- Kingdom: Animalia
- Phylum: Arthropoda
- Class: Insecta
- Order: Lepidoptera
- Superfamily: Noctuoidea
- Family: Noctuidae
- Subfamily: Metoponiinae
- Genus: Flammona; Walker, 1863

= Flammona =

Genus of moths

Flammona is a genus of moths of the family Noctuidae. The genus was erected by Francis Walker in 1863.

== Species ==
- Flammona curvifascia Warren, 1913 Sumatra
- Flammona quadrifasciata Walker, 1863 Peninsular Malaysia, Sumatra, Borneo
- Flammona trilineata Leech, 1900 China (Jiujiang)
