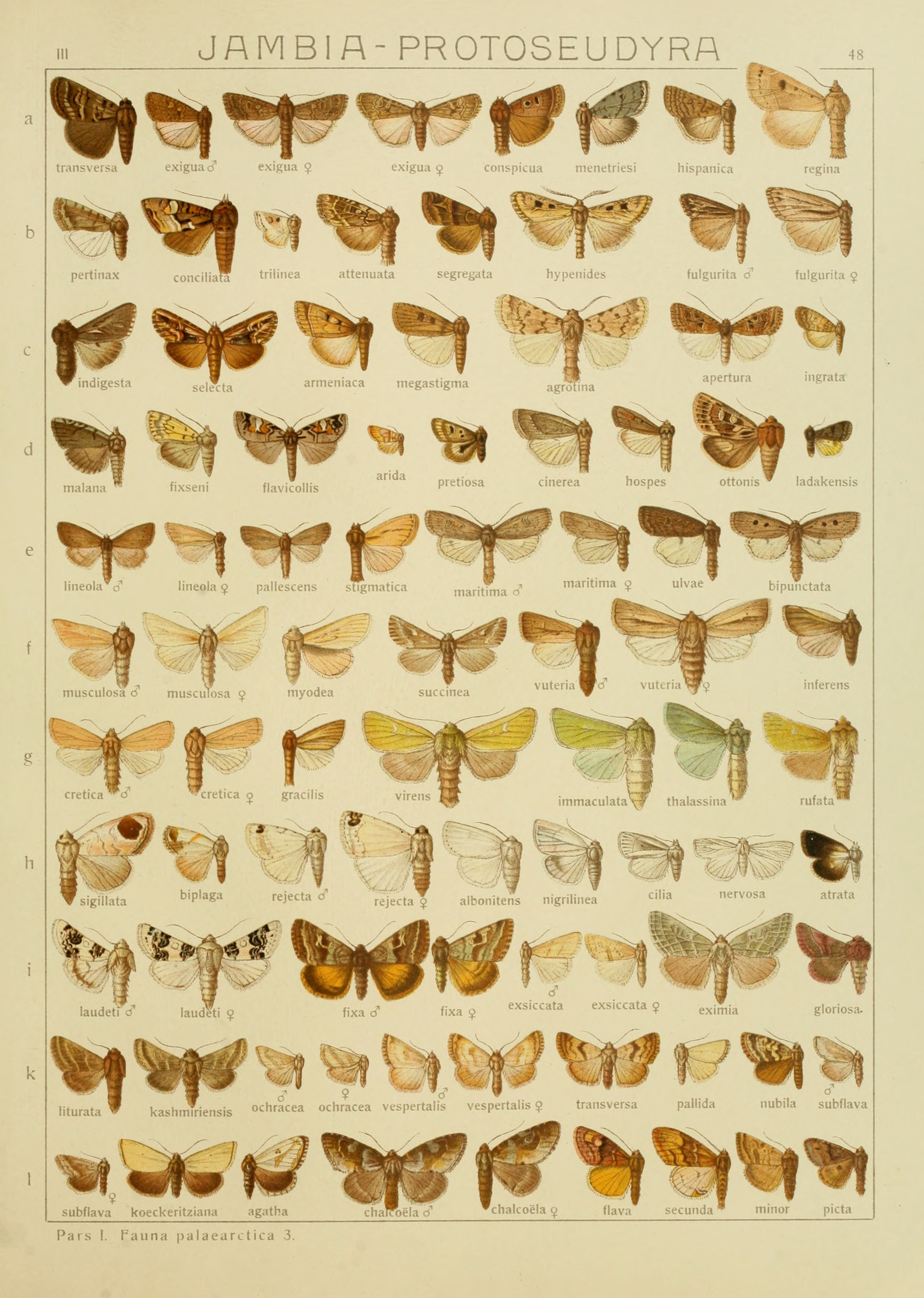
- Aegle semicana ab. transversa in Seitz (48k)

Scientific classification
- Domain: Eukaryota
- Kingdom: Animalia
- Phylum: Arthropoda
- Class: Insecta
- Order: Lepidoptera
- Superfamily: Noctuoidea
- Family: Noctuidae
- Genus: Aegle
- Species: A. semicana

Binomial name
- Aegle semicana (Esper, [1798])

Synonyms
- Phalaena semicana Esper, [1798]; Pyralis vespertalis Hübner, 1813; Anthophila vespertina Treitschke, 1826; Aegle mimetes Brandt, 1938

= Aegle semicana =

Species of moth

Aegle semicana is a moth of the family Noctuidae. It was described by Eugenius Johann Christoph Esper in 1798. It is found in Austria, Italy, Hungary, former Yugoslavia, Romania, Bulgaria, Albania, Greece, Turkey, Russia, Libya, Egypt, Syria, Iraq, Iran and Israel, as well as on Sardinia, Sicily, Malta and Cyprus.

The wingspan is 24–26 mm. Adults are on wing from May to September.

The larvae feed on Delphinium species.

== Subspecies ==
- Aegle semicana semicana
- Aegle semicana petroffi Andres & Seitz, 1925 (Egypt)

== Description from Seitz ==
AE. vespertalis Hbn. (= vespertina Tr., vespertinalis Smb., matutinalis Bmb.) (48 k). Forewing pale ochreous, with the 3 lines, inner, median, and outer ochraceous, thick and diffuse; the median widened in cell and containing a dark brown point in place of reniform, the outer excurved round cell; submarginal line rather darker, with dentate dark brown outer edge and a blotch at costa : a dark brown terminal line; fringe brownish grey: the male is slightly paler than thefemale hindwing flushed with ochraceous in female, in male pale ochreous, with curved outer lines; in ab. transversa ab. nov. (= ab. 1. Hmps.) (48 k) the median and outer lines are deep brown and distinct, and the hindwing grey. A mediterranean species occurring in Spain, Portugal, Sicily, Greece, Carinthia, Roumania; in Algeria; and in Asia Minor, Armenia, Syria, and Taurus. Larva dull rosy on the dorsum, with fine pale yellow subdorsal lines, conspicuous at the segmental incisions, and with broad yellow spiracular lines edged on each side with dark brown; head small, yellowish brown; ? on Delphinium.
