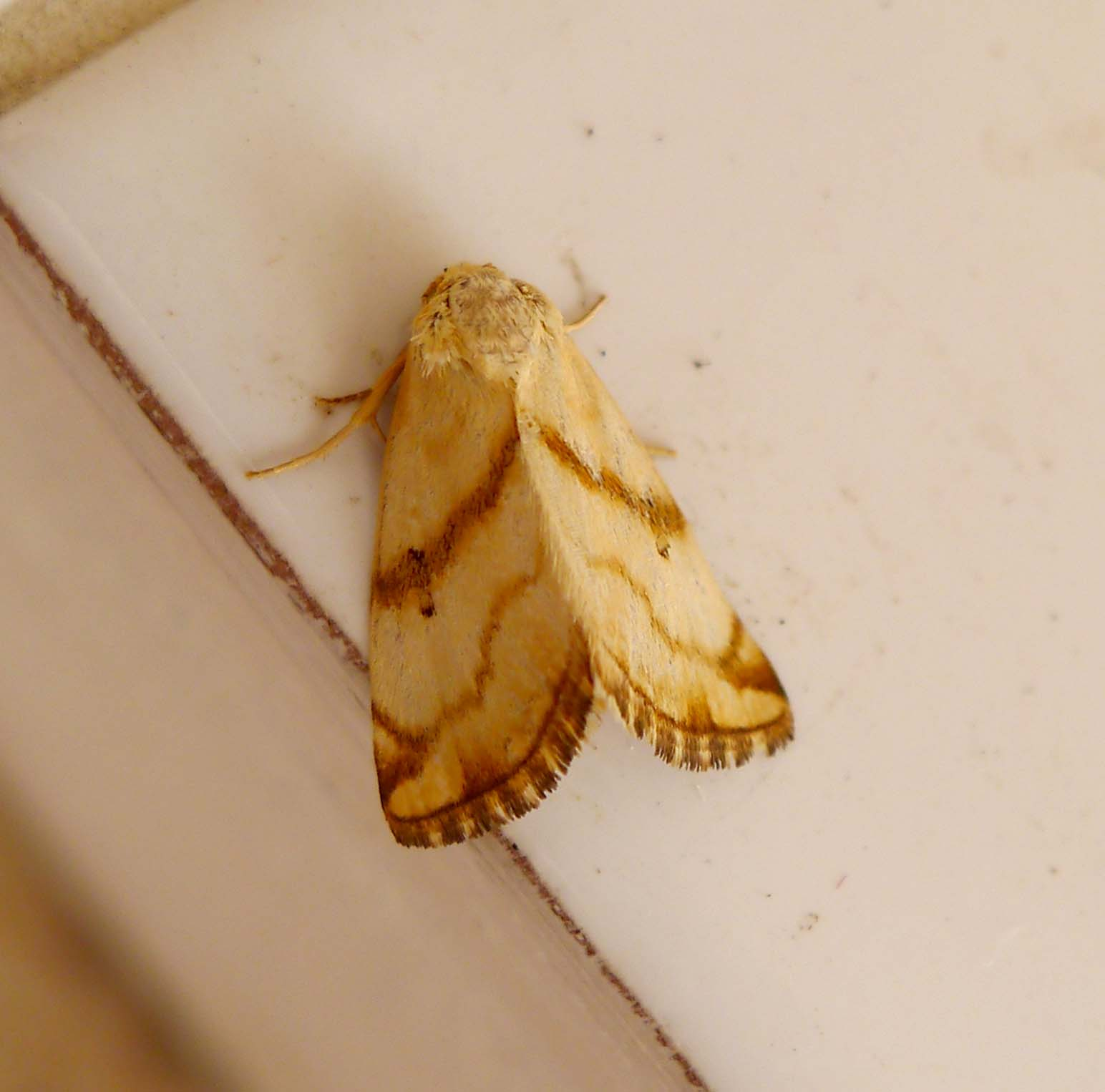
- Aegle vespertinalis

Scientific classification
- Kingdom: Animalia
- Phylum: Arthropoda
- Clade: Pancrustacea
- Class: Insecta
- Order: Lepidoptera
- Superfamily: Noctuoidea
- Family: Noctuidae
- Subfamily: Metoponiinae
- Genus: Aegle; Hübner, 1823

= Aegle (moth) =

Genus of moths

Aegle is a genus of moths of the family Noctuidae.

== Species ==
- Aegle agatha
- Aegle diatemna
- Aegle eberti
- Aegle exquisita
- Aegle flava
- Aegle gratiosa
- Aegle hedychroa (Turner, 1904)
- Aegle iranica
- Aegle koekeritziana (Hübner, [1799])
- Aegle limbobrunnea
- Aegle lineata
- Aegle margarita
- Aegle matutinalis
- Aegle nubila (Staudinger, 1891)
- Aegle ottoi
- Aegle petroffi
- Aegle rebeli
- Aegle semicana
- Aegle subflava (Erschoff, 1874)
- Aegle transversa
- Aegle vartianorum
- Aegle vespertalis
- Aegle vespertina
- Aegle vespertinalis
