= Nacopa melanderi =

Scientific classification
- Domain: Eukaryota
- Kingdom: Animalia
- Phylum: Arthropoda
- Class: Insecta
- Order: Lepidoptera
- Superfamily: Noctuoidea
- Family: Noctuidae
- Genus: Nacopa
- Species: N. melanderi

Binomial name
- Nacopa melanderi Barnes & Benjamin, 1927

Species of moth

Nacopa melanderi is a species of moth in the family Noctuidae (the owlet moths). It was first described by William Barnes and Foster Hendrickson Benjamin in 1927 and it is found in North America.

The MONA or Hodges number for Nacopa melanderi is 9828.
