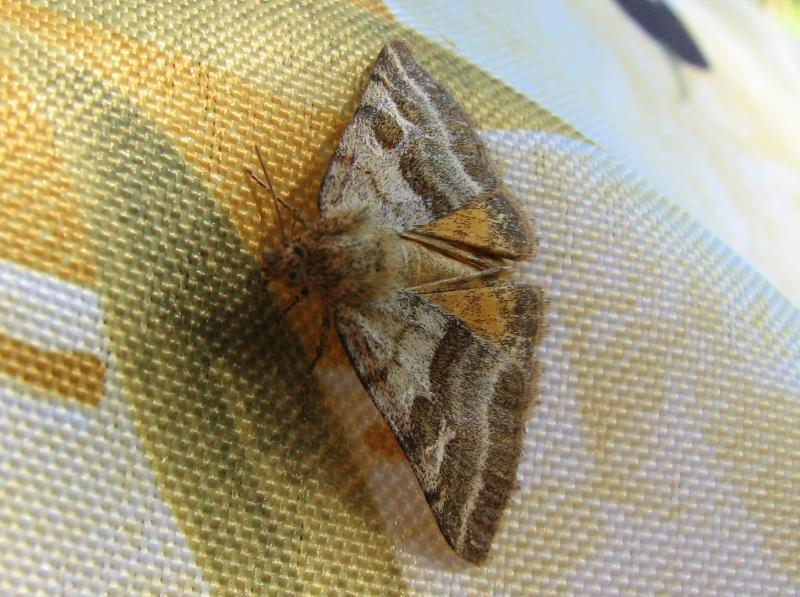

Scientific classification
- Domain: Eukaryota
- Kingdom: Animalia
- Phylum: Arthropoda
- Class: Insecta
- Order: Lepidoptera
- Superfamily: Noctuoidea
- Family: Noctuidae
- Subfamily: Metoponiinae
- Genus: Synthymia; Hübner, 1823
- Species: S. fixa

Binomial name
- Synthymia fixa (Fabricius, 1787)

Synonyms
- Metoptria Guenee, 1841; Noctua fixa Fabricius, 1787; Metoptria australis Oberthur, 1918; Noctua monogramma Hubner, 1808

= Synthymia =

Genus of moths

Synthymia is a genus of moths of the family Noctuidae. It contains only one species, Synthymia fixa, The Goldwing, which is found in southern Europe and North Africa.

== Technical description and variation ==
S. fixa F. (= monogramma Hbn.) (48 i). Forewing ash grey in the male, darker, slightly greenish grey in the female the outer half of wing suffused with brownish, the whole speckled with black; orbicular stigma oval, grey in a whitish ring, placed vertically at the edge of the grey basal space; reniform also vertical, an elongate figure of 8, white with dark grey centres; space between them crossed by a deep brown band, sometimes velvety brown in cell, the median vein showing white across it; inner and outer lines brownish, ill-defined; the inner waved, nearly vertical, the outer sinuous edged by grey and on the costa whitish; subterminal line thick, whitish; fringe dark-mottled; hindwing orange, deeper in female than in male; the base diffusely dark; terminal border olive brown, broad at apex, with traces of a submarginal line on inner margin; in the male more fuscous tinged, with traces of outer and submarginal lines; in the ab. griseofusa ab.nov. (= ab. 2. Hmps.) the whole of the hindwing is fuscous. Larva dark green, the dorsum lighter; dorsal and subdorsal lines pale yellow, edged with dark green; lateral stripe white, broad, with dark upper edge; head small, yellowish; thoracic plate black; anal plate brown. The wingspan is 37–40 mm.

== Biology ==
Adults are on wing from April to July. There is one generation per year.

The larvae feed on the flowers of Psoralea bituminosa.
