= Aegle nubila =

Scientific classification
- Kingdom: Animalia
- Phylum: Arthropoda
- Class: Insecta
- Order: Lepidoptera
- Superfamily: Noctuoidea
- Family: Noctuidae
- Genus: Aegle
- Species: A. nubila

Binomial name
- Aegle nubila (Staudinger, 1891)

Synonyms
- Metoponia nubila Staudinger, 1891

Species of moth

Aegle nubila is a moth of the family Noctuidae. It is found in Turkey.
