= Acopa =

Scientific classification
- Kingdom: Animalia
- Phylum: Arthropoda
- Clade: Pancrustacea
- Class: Insecta
- Order: Lepidoptera
- Superfamily: Noctuoidea
- Family: Noctuidae
- Subtribe: Triocnemidina
- Genus: Acopa; Harvey, 1875

Synonyms
- Grypotes Dyar, 1917; Zatilpa Dyar, 1920

Genus of moths

Acopa is a genus of moths of the family Noctuidae. The genus was erected by Leon F. Harvey in 1875.

== Species ==
- Acopa carina Harvey, 1875
- Acopa perpallida Grote, 1878
