= Proschaliphora albida =

Scientific classification
- Kingdom: Animalia
- Phylum: Arthropoda
- Class: Insecta
- Order: Lepidoptera
- Superfamily: Noctuoidea
- Family: Noctuidae
- Genus: Proschaliphora
- Species: P. albida

Binomial name
- Proschaliphora albida Hampson, 1909

Synonyms
- Proschaliphora traiecta Grünberg, 1910

Species of moth

Proschaliphora albida is a moth in the subfamily Arctiinae. It was described by George Hampson in 1909. It is found in Mozambique, Namibia and South Africa.
