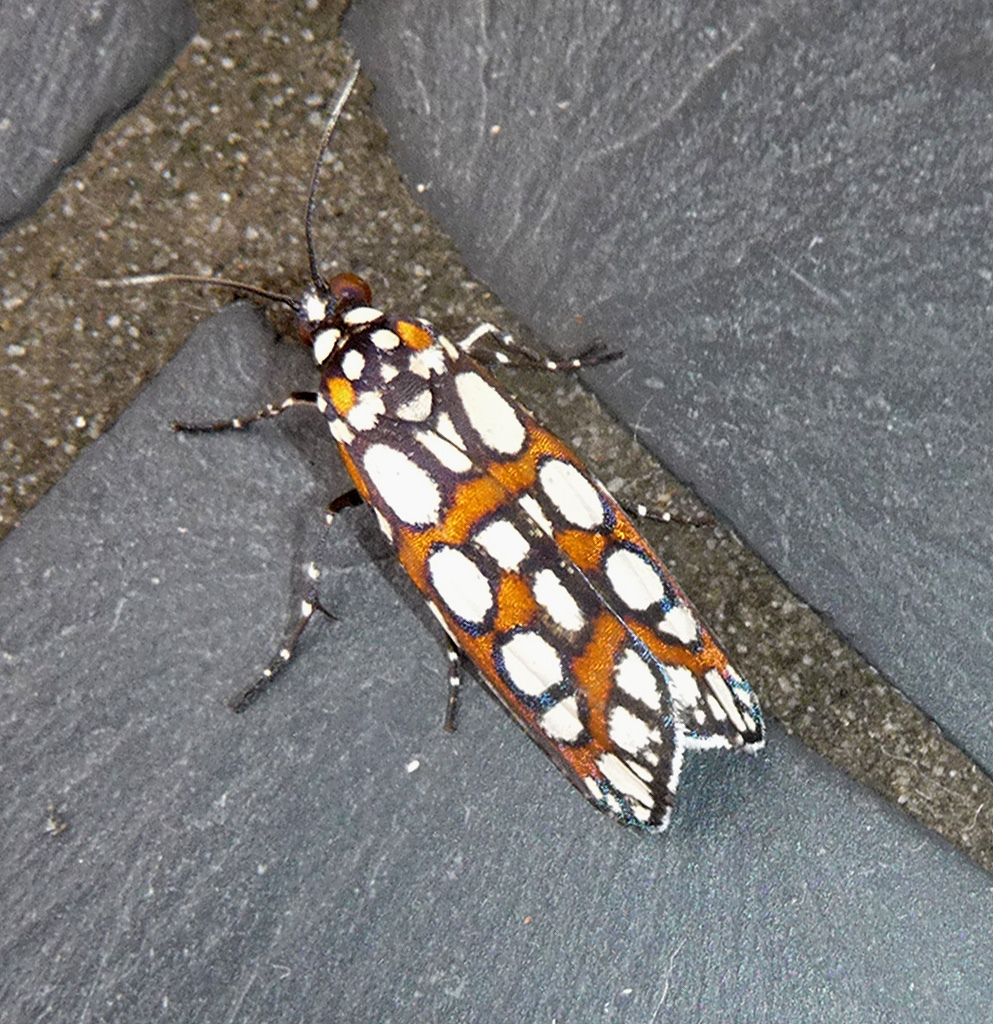

Scientific classification
- Domain: Eukaryota
- Kingdom: Animalia
- Phylum: Arthropoda
- Class: Insecta
- Order: Lepidoptera
- Superfamily: Noctuoidea
- Family: Noctuidae
- Genus: Cydosia
- Species: C. nobilitella

Binomial name
- Cydosia nobilitella (Cramer, [1779])

Synonyms
- Phalaena nobilitella Cramer, 1779; Cydosia brasiliella Guenée, 1879; Cydosia chrysorrhaeella Guenée, 1879; Cydosia cyanella Guenée, 1879; Cydosia graciella Guenée, 1879; Prays hilarella Snellen, 1878; Bombyx histrio Fabricius, 1781; Cydosia jamaicensis Cockerell, 1896; Crameria nobilis Hübner, 1819; Eggyna submutata Walker, 1866; Cydosia westwoodi H. Druce, 1897

= Cydosia nobilitella =

Species of moth

Cydosia nobilitella, the curve-lined cydosia moth or regal cydosia moth, is a moth of the family Noctuidae. The species was first described by Pieter Cramer in 1779. It is found from southern Florida south to Argentina, and is also found in the Antilles.

The wingspan is 20–25 mm

The larvae have been recorded feeding on Spigelia anthelmia.
