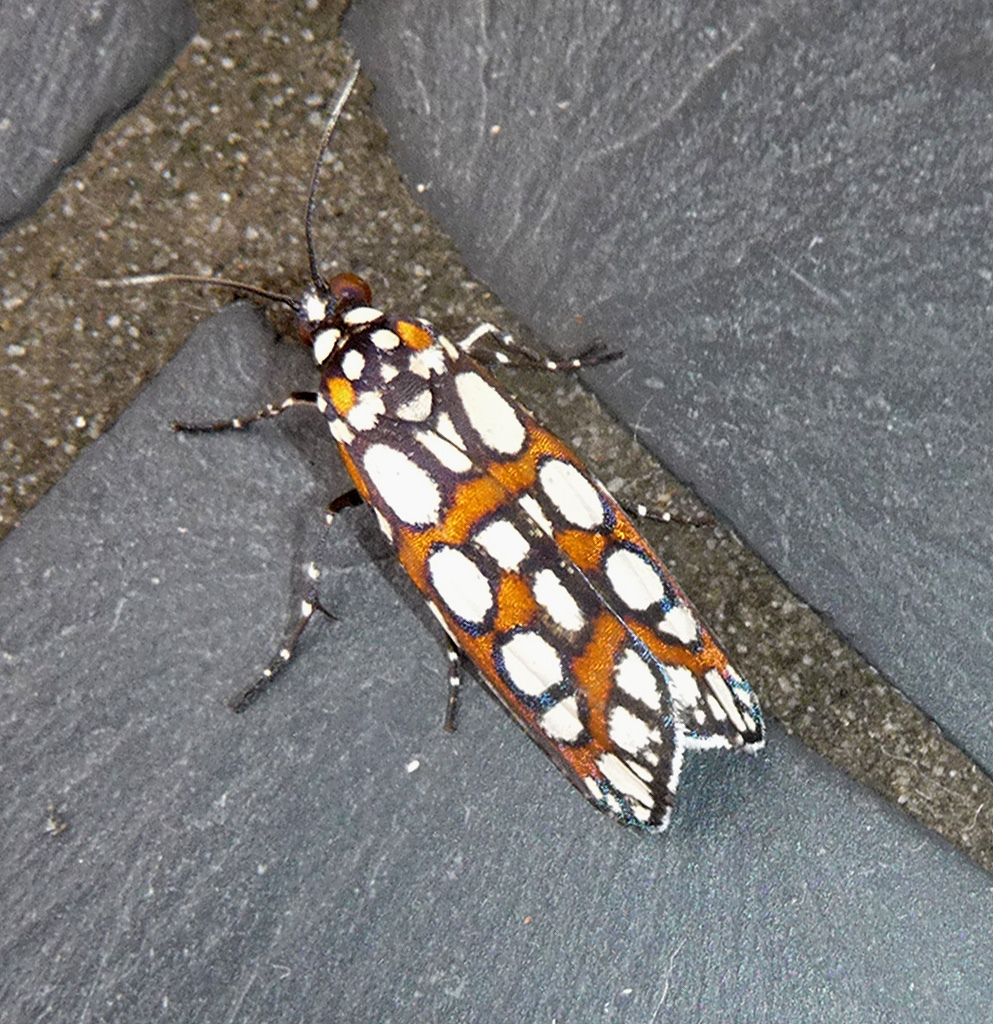

Scientific classification
- Kingdom: Animalia
- Phylum: Arthropoda
- Class: Insecta
- Order: Lepidoptera
- Superfamily: Noctuoidea
- Family: Noctuidae
- Subfamily: Metoponiinae
- Tribe: Cydosiini
- Genus: Cydosia; Duncan [& Westwood], 1841

Synonyms
- Eggyna Walker, 1866; Penthetria Edwards, 1881; Tantura Kirby, 1892

= Cydosia =

Genus of moths

The noctuid (owlet) moth genus Cydosia is the only member of the tribe Cydosiini in the subfamily Acontiinae. The genus was erected by James Duncan with John O. Westwood in 1841. The few species occur from Argentina along the Andes to the Caribbean and Central America, reaching into the southern United States. The unusual format for the authority citation is explained at Butterflies and Moths of the World as "The difficulty can best be overcome by attributing Westwood with anonymous junior authorship."

== Species ==
- Cydosia aurivitta Grote & Robinson, 1868
- Cydosia curvinella Guenée, 1879 (syn: Cydosia phaedra Druce, 1897)
- Cydosia garnotella Guenée, 1879
- Cydosia hyva E. D. Jones, 1912
- Cydosia mimica Walker, 1866
- Cydosia nobilitella Cramer, [1779]
- Cydosia primaeva Draudt, 1927
- Cydosia punctistriga Schaus, 1904
- Cydosia rimata Draudt, 1927
- Cydosia tessellatilla Strecker, 1899
