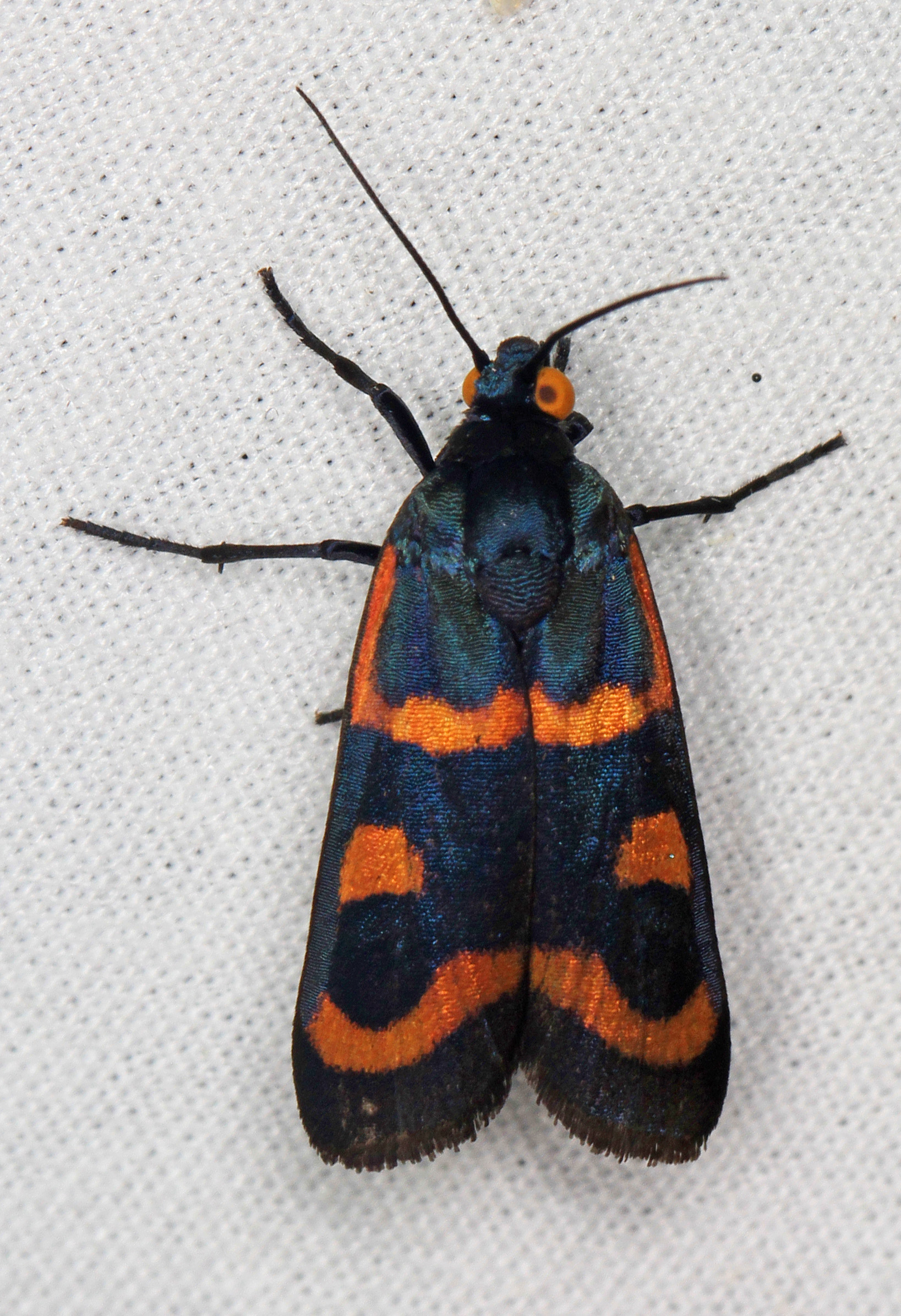

Scientific classification
- Domain: Eukaryota
- Kingdom: Animalia
- Phylum: Arthropoda
- Class: Insecta
- Order: Lepidoptera
- Superfamily: Noctuoidea
- Family: Noctuidae
- Genus: Cydosia
- Species: C. aurivitta

Binomial name
- Cydosia aurivitta Grote & Robinson, 1868

= Cydosia aurivitta =

Species of moth

Cydosia aurivitta, the gold-banded cydosia or straight-lined cydosia, is an owlet moth (family Noctuidae). The species was first described by Augustus Radcliffe Grote and Coleman Townsend Robinson in 1868. It is found in North America.

The MONA or Hodges number for Cydosia aurivitta is 8999.

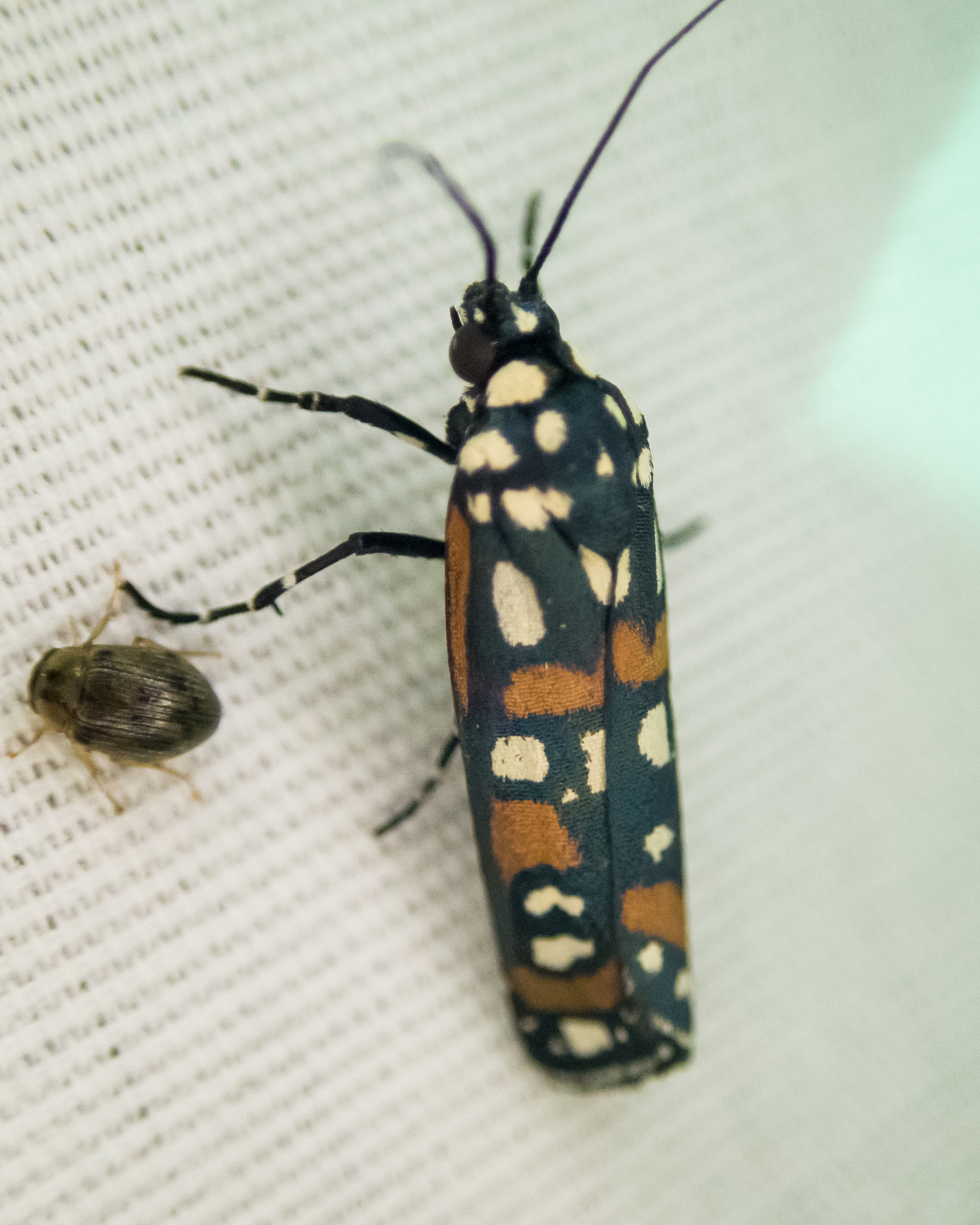
A different morph
