= Nacopa =

Scientific classification
- Domain: Eukaryota
- Kingdom: Animalia
- Phylum: Arthropoda
- Class: Insecta
- Order: Lepidoptera
- Superfamily: Noctuoidea
- Family: Noctuidae
- Subfamily: Noctuinae
- Genus: Nacopa; Barnes & Benjamin, 1924

Genus of moths

Nacopa is a genus of moths of the family Noctuidae erected by William Barnes and Foster Hendrickson Benjamin in 1924.

== Species ==
- Nacopa bistrigata (Barnes & McDunnough, 1918)
- Nacopa melanderi Barnes & Benjamin, 1927
