= Pyrausta silhetalis =

Scientific classification
- Kingdom: Animalia
- Phylum: Arthropoda
- Class: Insecta
- Order: Lepidoptera
- Family: Crambidae
- Genus: Pyrausta
- Species: P. silhetalis

Binomial name
- Pyrausta silhetalis Guenée, 1854

Synonyms
- Botys pangialis C. Felder, R. Felder & Rogenhofer, 1875; Panemeria lateralis Walker, 1862; Pyrausta cuprealis Moore, 1878

Species of moth

Pyrausta silhetalis is a moth in the family Crambidae. It was described by Achille Guenée in 1854. It is found in Bangladesh, India (Silhet, Himalaya, Hindustan) and Kashmir.
