= Axenus =

Scientific classification
- Domain: Eukaryota
- Kingdom: Animalia
- Phylum: Arthropoda
- Class: Insecta
- Order: Lepidoptera
- Superfamily: Noctuoidea
- Family: Noctuidae
- Subfamily: Metoponiinae
- Genus: Axenus; Grote, 1873
- Species: A. arvalis

Binomial name
- Axenus arvalis Grote, 1873

Synonyms
- Axenus ochraceus H. Edwards, 1875; Axenus amplus H. Edwards, 1875

Genus of moths

Axenus is a monotypic moth genus of the family Noctuidae. Its only species, Axenus arvalis, is found in the US states of California and Oregon. Both the genus and species were first described by Augustus Radcliffe Grote in 1873.
