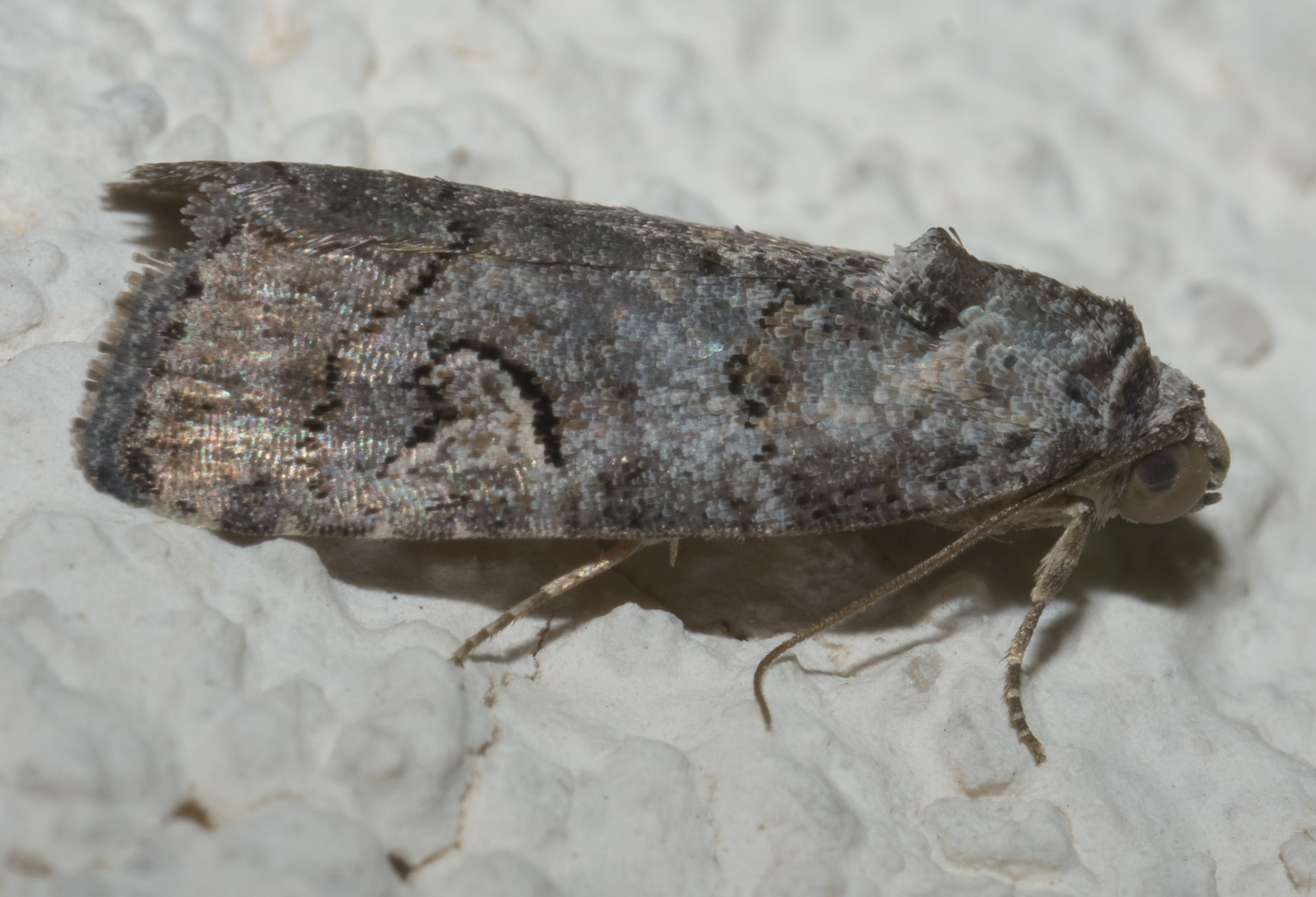
- Metaponpneumata rogenhoferi

Scientific classification
- Domain: Eukaryota
- Kingdom: Animalia
- Phylum: Arthropoda
- Class: Insecta
- Order: Lepidoptera
- Superfamily: Noctuoidea
- Family: Noctuidae
- Subfamily: Metoponiinae
- Genus: Metaponpneumata; Möschler, 1890
- Species: M. rogenhoferi

Binomial name
- Metaponpneumata rogenhoferi Moschler, 1890

Synonyms
- Generic: Prorachia (Acronyctinae) Hampson, 1908; Prorachia (Acronyctinae) Hampson, 1909; Specific: Thalpochares daria H. Druce, 1898

= Metaponpneumata =

Genus and species of moth

Metaponpneumata is a monotypic moth genus of the family Noctuidae. Its only species, Metaponpneumata rogenhoferi, is found in Mexico and Puerto Rico. Both the genus and species were first described by Heinrich Benno Möschler in 1890.
