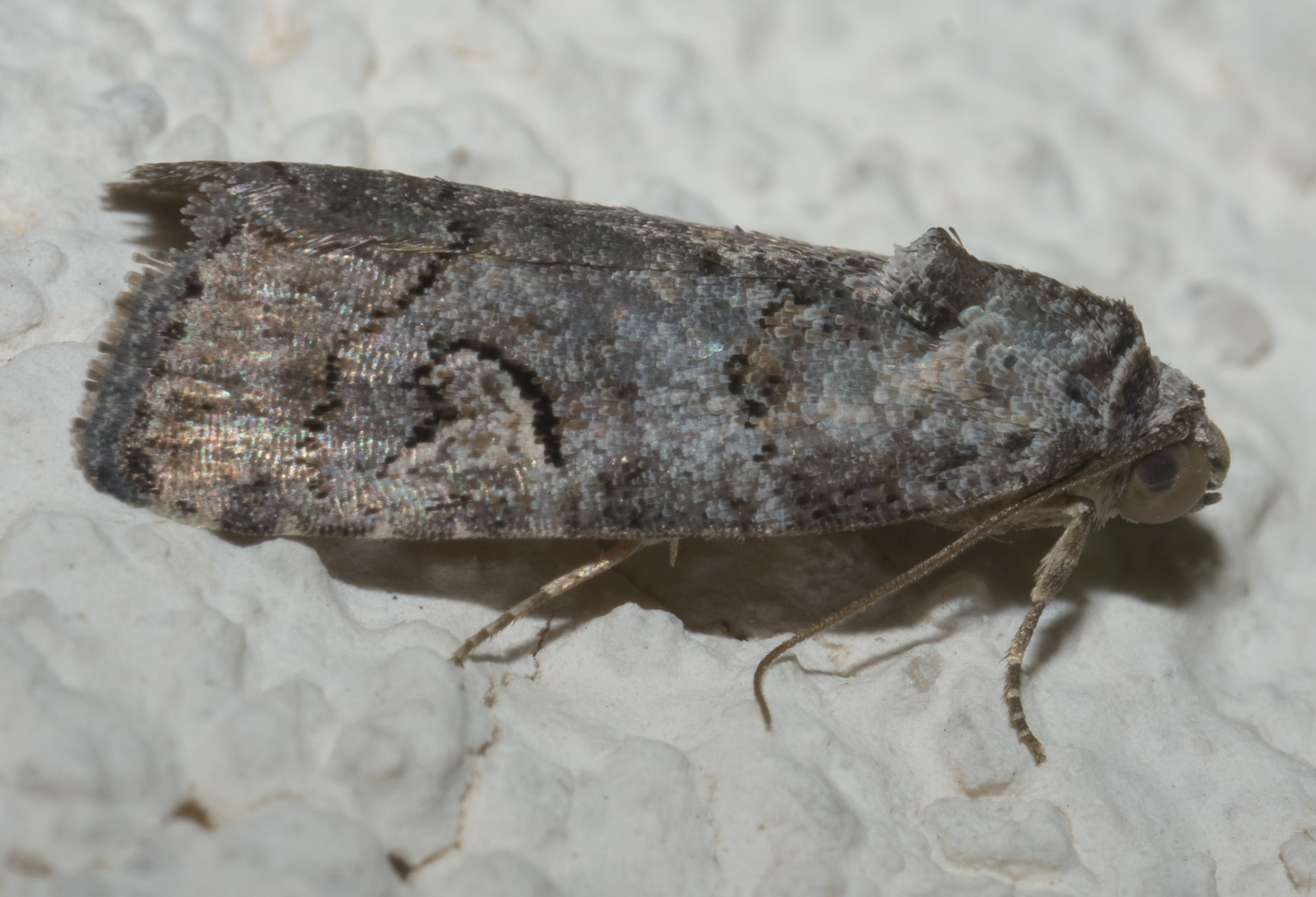
- Metaponpneumata rogenhoferi

Scientific classification
- Kingdom: Animalia
- Phylum: Arthropoda
- Clade: Pancrustacea
- Class: Insecta
- Order: Lepidoptera
- Superfamily: Noctuoidea
- Family: Noctuidae
- Tribe: Psaphidini
- Subtribe: Triocnemidina

= Triocnemidina =

Subtribe of moths

Triocnemidina is a subtribe of owlet moths in the family Noctuidae. There are about 16 genera and at least 30 described species in Triocnemidina.

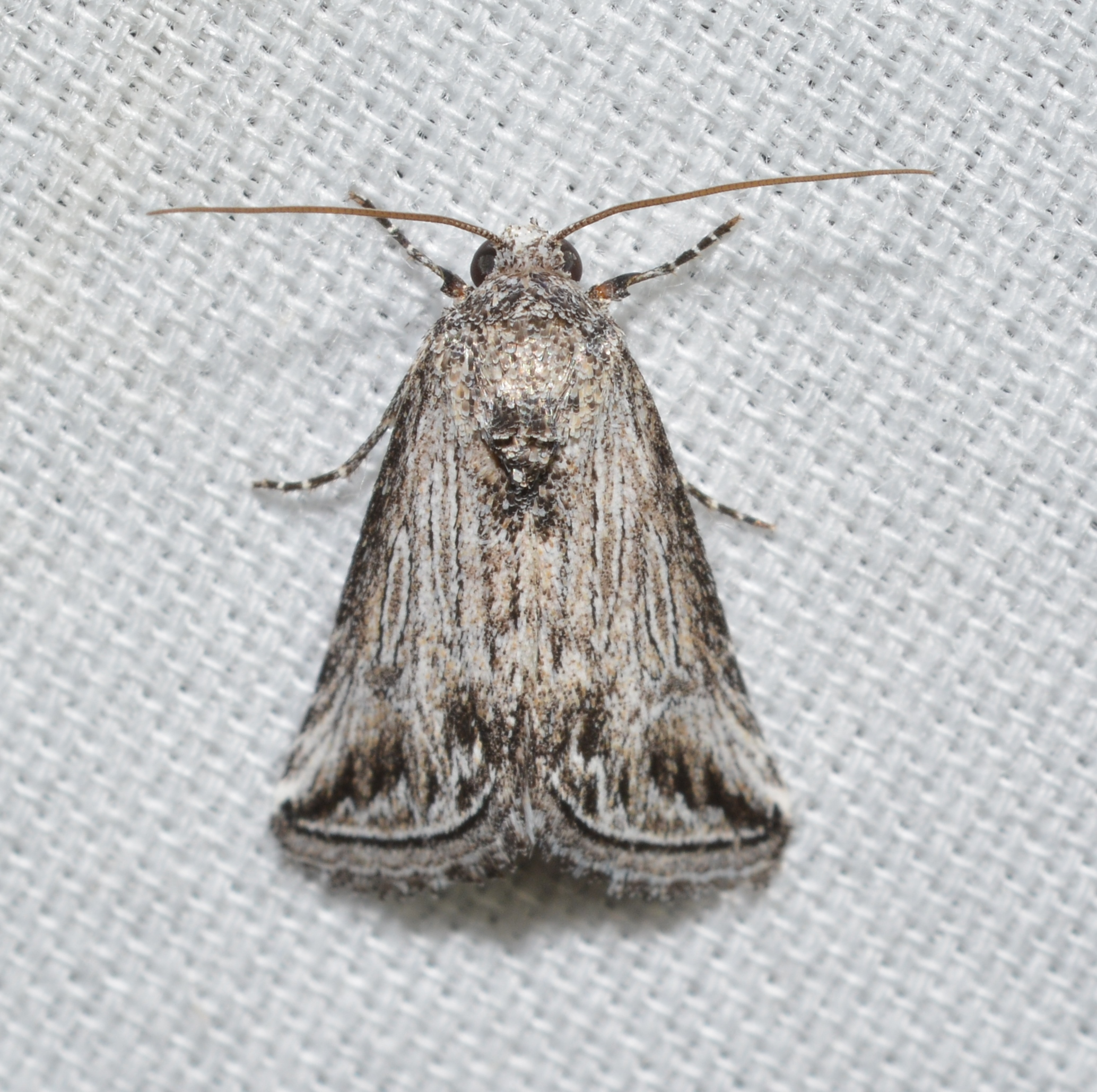
Oxycnemis gracillinea

== Genera ==
- Acopa Harvey, 1875
- Airamia Barnes & Benjamin, 1926
- Aleptina Dyar, 1902
- Anycteola Barnes & Benjamin, 1929
- Copibryophila Smith, 1900
- Crimona Smith, 1902
- Eviridemas Barnes & Benjamin, 1929
- Fota Grote, 1882
- Gloanna Nye, 1975
- Leucocnemis Hampson, 1908
- Metaponpneumata Möschler, 1890
- Nacopa Barnes & Benjamin, 1924
- Oxycnemis Grote, 1882
- Policocnemis Benjamin, 1932
- Triocnemis Grote, 1881
- Unciella Troubridge, 2008
