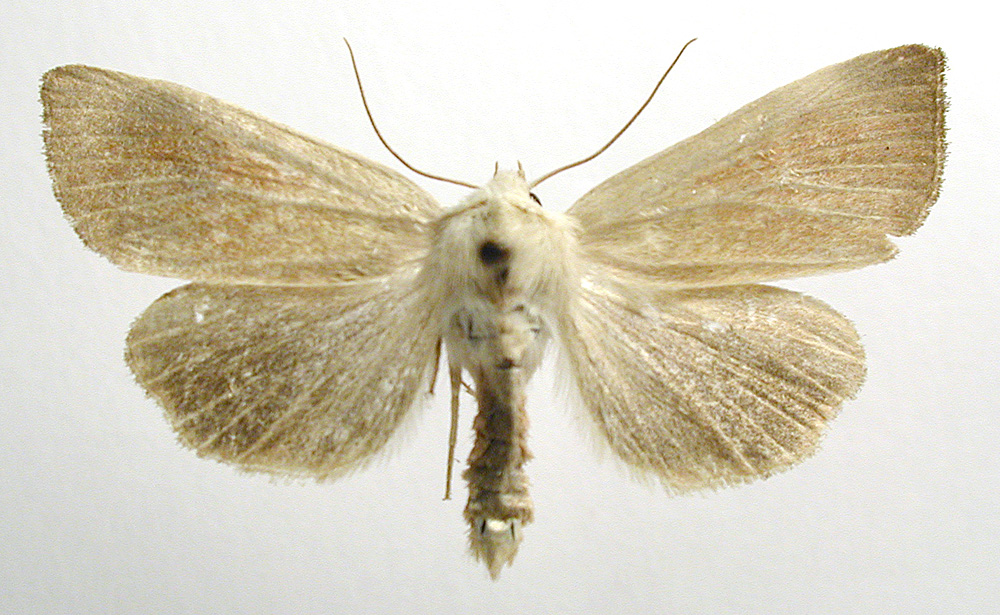

Scientific classification
- Kingdom: Animalia
- Phylum: Arthropoda
- Class: Insecta
- Order: Lepidoptera
- Superfamily: Noctuoidea
- Family: Noctuidae
- Subfamily: Acronictinae
- Genus: Arenostola; Hampson, 1908

= Arenostola =

Genus of moths

Arenostola is a genus of moths of the family Noctuidae.

== Species ==
- Arenostola phragmitidis – fen wainscot (Hübner, [1803])
- Arenostola taurica (Staudinger, 1899)
- Arenostola unicolor Warren, 1914
- Arenostola zernyi (Schwingenschuss, 1935)
