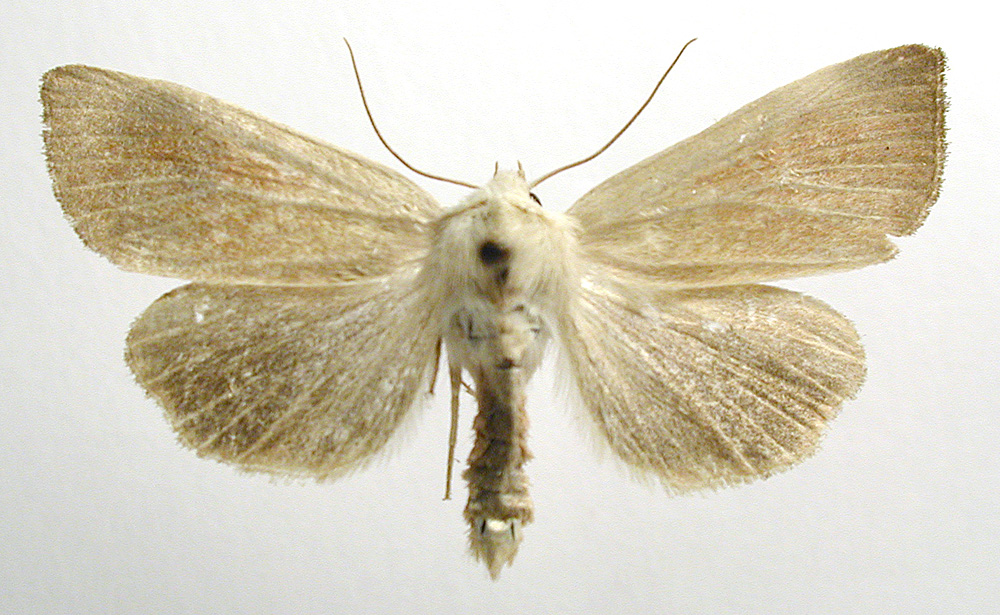

Scientific classification
- Domain: Eukaryota
- Kingdom: Animalia
- Phylum: Arthropoda
- Class: Insecta
- Order: Lepidoptera
- Superfamily: Noctuoidea
- Family: Noctuidae
- Genus: Arenostola
- Species: A. phragmitidis

Binomial name
- Arenostola phragmitidis (Hübner, [1803])

Synonyms
- Noctua phragmitidis Hübner, [1803]; Phalaena (Noctua) semicana Esper, 1798; Leucania verecunda Eversmann, 1848; Arenostola semicana; Xanthodes morawitzii Ménétriés, 1863; Calamia phragmatidis f. maculata Warnecke, 1922

= Arenostola phragmitidis =

Fen wainscot

Species of moth

Arenostola phragmitidis, the fen wainscot, is a moth of the family Noctuidae. The species was first described by Jacob Hübner in 1803. It is found in most of Europe (except Ireland, Iceland, the Iberian Peninsula and the western part of the Balkan Peninsula), western Siberia, Turkey, Iraq, Afghanistan, Central Asia and China.

== Technical description and variation ==
A. phragmitidis Hbn. (= semicana Esp., verecunda Ev., moravitzii Men.) (49 d). Forewing very smooth, pale ochreous, becoming pale brownish red towards termen; the fringe dark at tips; hindwing pale greyish ochreous; — the ab. rufescens Tutt (49 d) is flushed throughout with deep flesh colour; ab. pallida Tutt (49 e), the usual British form, is smooth pale ochreous throughout; ab. olivescens ab. nov. (49 e), is smooth olive grey, the hindwing dark grey. Larva bone-colour; subdorsal line somewhat interrupted, broad, purplish-fuscous; lateral lines similar, but narrower; head black; thoracic plate brown. The wingspan is 32–36 mm.

== Biology ==
Adults are on wing from July to August.

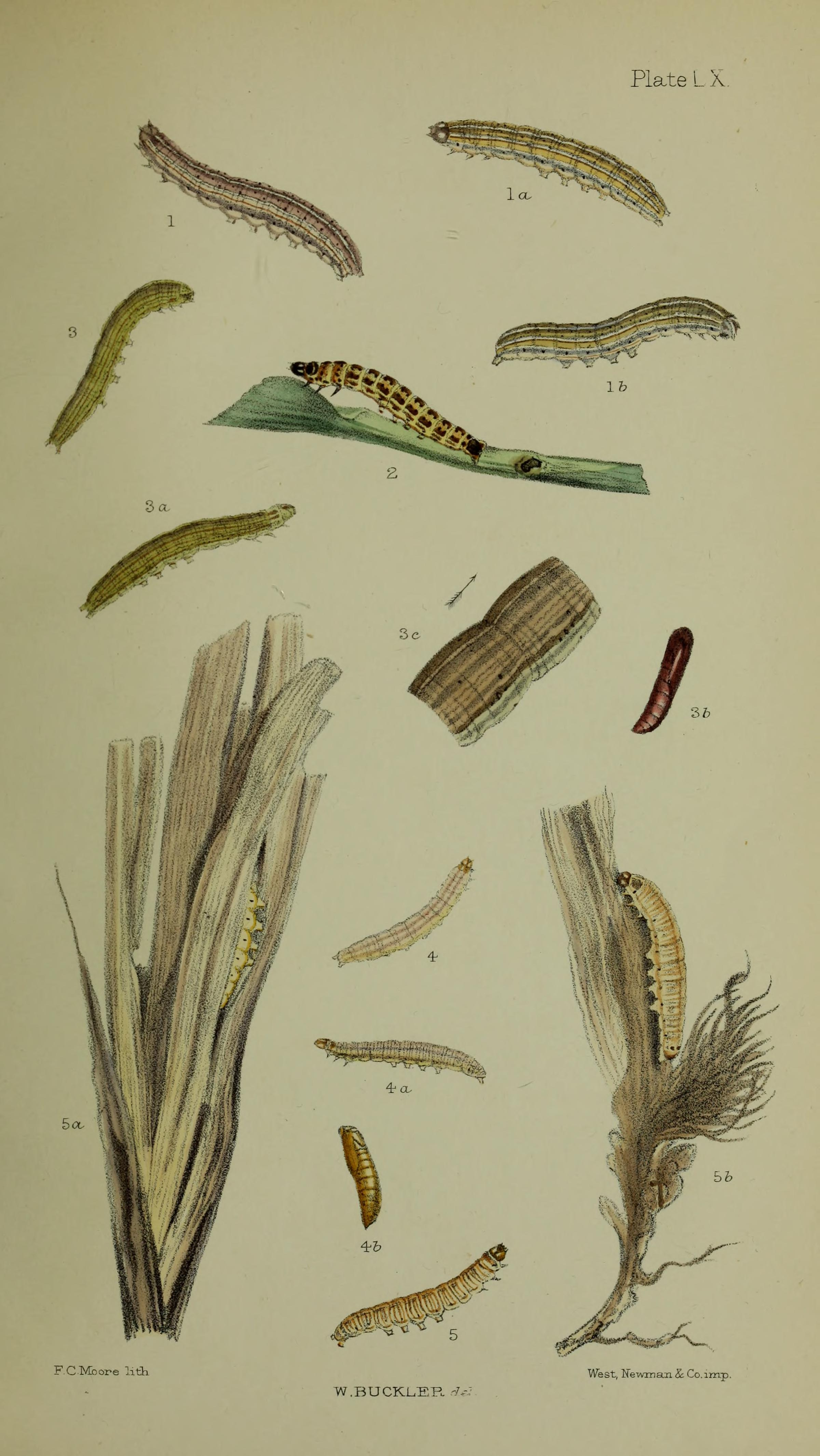
Figs 2 larva after last moult larva after last moult (stems Common Reed)

The larvae feed internally in the stems of Phragmites australis.
