= Arasada =

Arasada may refer to:

- Arasada rishi (moth), a genus of moths of the family Noctuidae
- Arasada, Vizianagaram district, a village in Balijipeta mandal of Vizianagaram district
