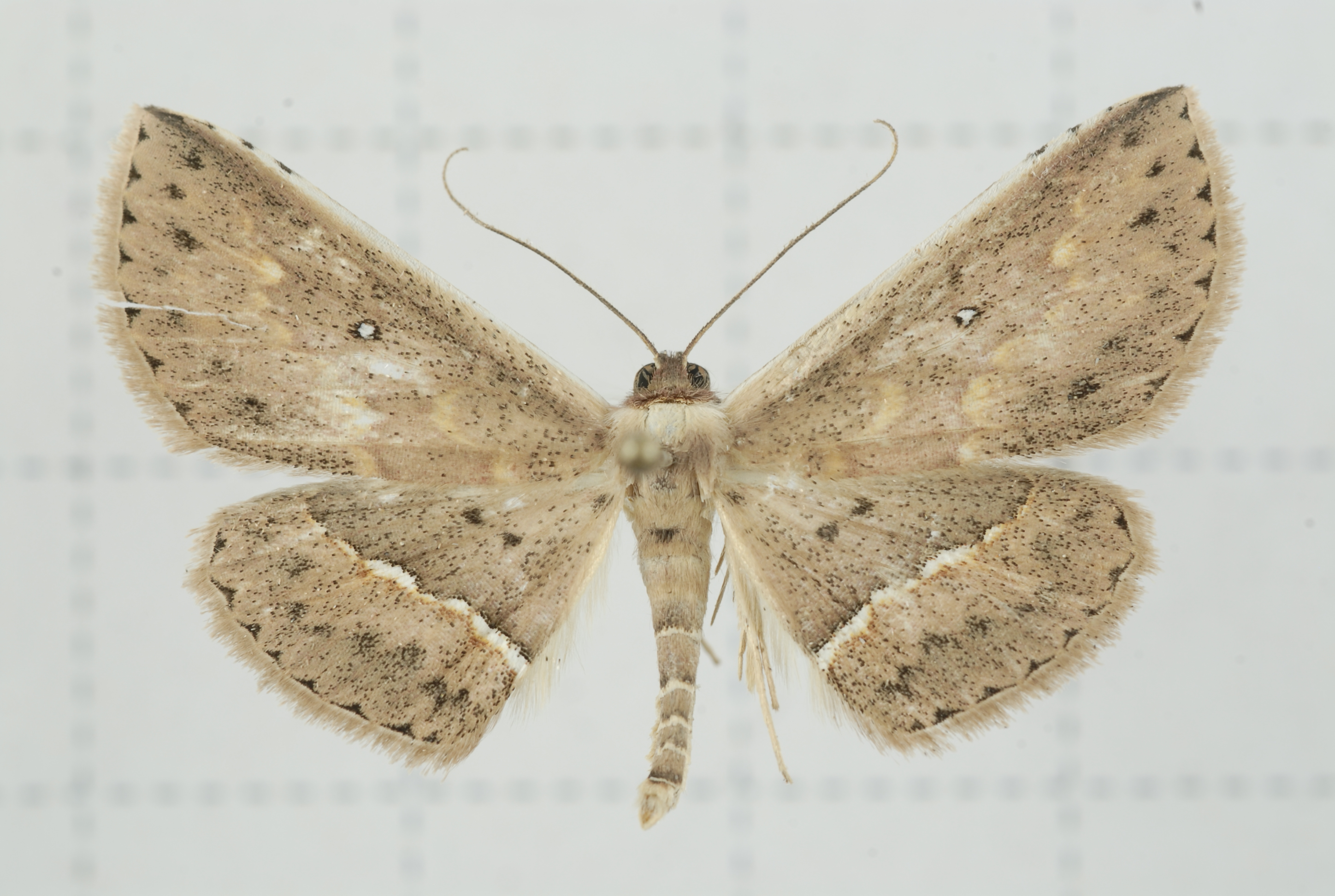

Scientific classification
- Domain: Eukaryota
- Kingdom: Animalia
- Phylum: Arthropoda
- Class: Insecta
- Order: Lepidoptera
- Superfamily: Noctuoidea
- Family: Erebidae
- Subfamily: Boletobiinae
- Tribe: Aventiini
- Genus: Arasada
- Species: A. pyraliformis

Binomial name
- Arasada pyraliformis Moore, 1884

= Arasada pyraliformis =

Species of moth

Arasada pyraliformis is a moth of the family Noctuidae first described by Frederic Moore in 1884. It is found in Sri Lanka, Taiwan and Thailand.
