= Arasada, Vizianagaram district =

Arasada
- Village
- Interactive map of Arasada
- Location in Andhra Pradesh, India Arasada (India)
- Coordinates: 18.543583°N 83.648143°E
- Country: India
- State: Andhra Pradesh
- District: Vizianagaram

Population (2001)
  - Total: 3,230

Languages
  - Official: Telugu
- Time zone: UTC+5:30 (IST)
- PIN: 532122
- Vehicle registration: AP-35
- Nearest city: Vizianagaram
- Climate: hot (Köppen)

Arasada is a village in Vangara mandal of Vizianagaram district, Andhra Pradesh, India.

== Demographics ==
As of 2001 Indian census, the demographic details of Arasada village is as follows:

- Total Population: 3,230 in 802 Households.
- Male Population: 1,594 and Female Population: 1,636
- Children Under 6-years of age: 379 (Boys - 190 and Girls - 189)
- Total Literates: 1,340
