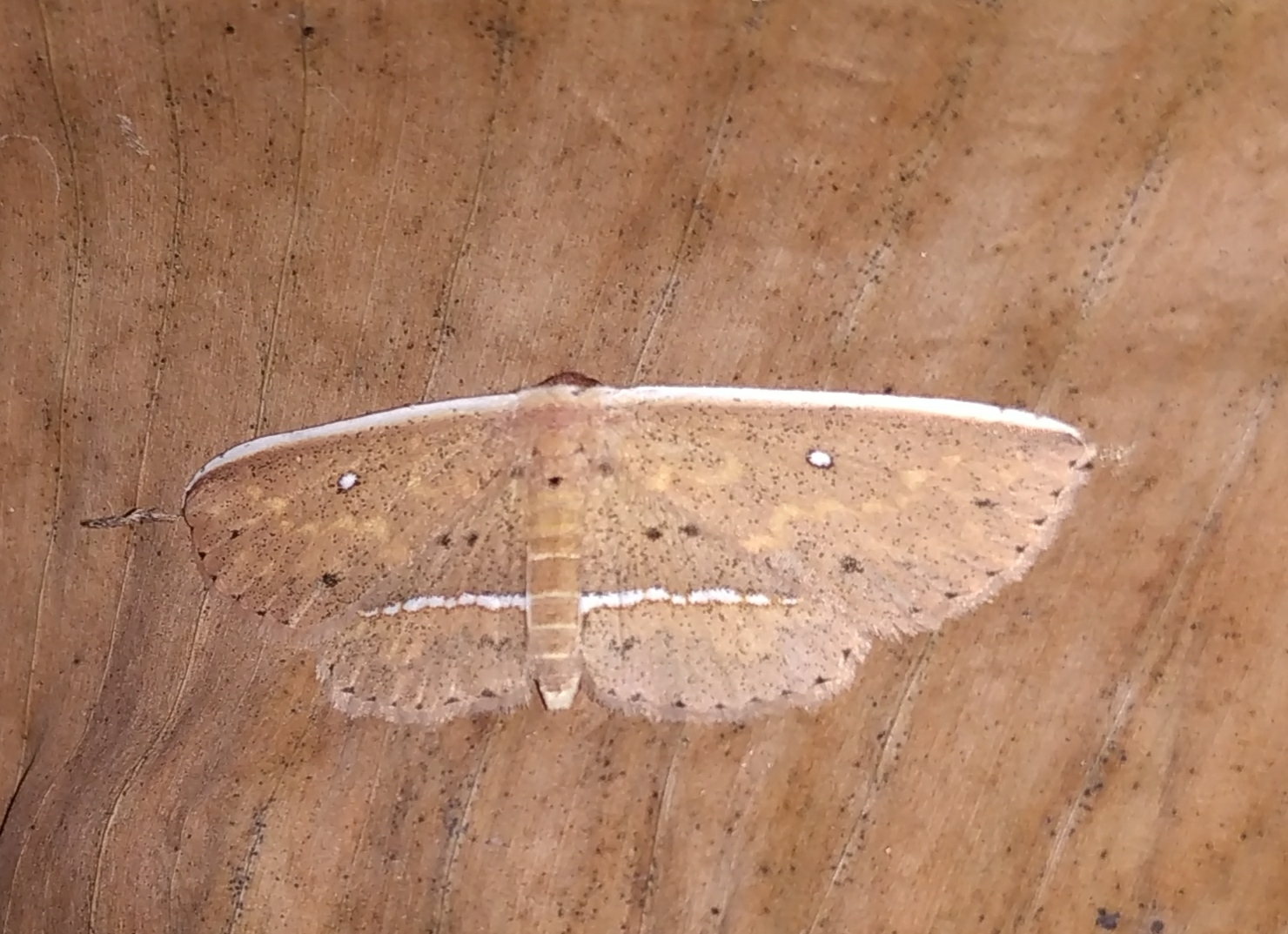
- Arasada, India

Scientific classification
- Domain: Eukaryota
- Kingdom: Animalia
- Phylum: Arthropoda
- Class: Insecta
- Order: Lepidoptera
- Superfamily: Noctuoidea
- Family: Erebidae
- Subfamily: Boletobiinae
- Tribe: Aventiini
- Genus: Arasada; Moore, 1885

= Arasada (moth) =

Genus of moths

Arasada is a genus of moths in the family Erebidae. There are about five described species in Arasada, found from India and Sri Lanka to Southeast and East Asia.

== Species ==
- Arasada albicosta Hampson, 1894
- Arasada javanica Hampson, 1910
- Arasada kanshireiensis Wileman, 1916
- Arasada ornata Wileman, 1911
- Arasada pyraliformis Moore, [1885]
