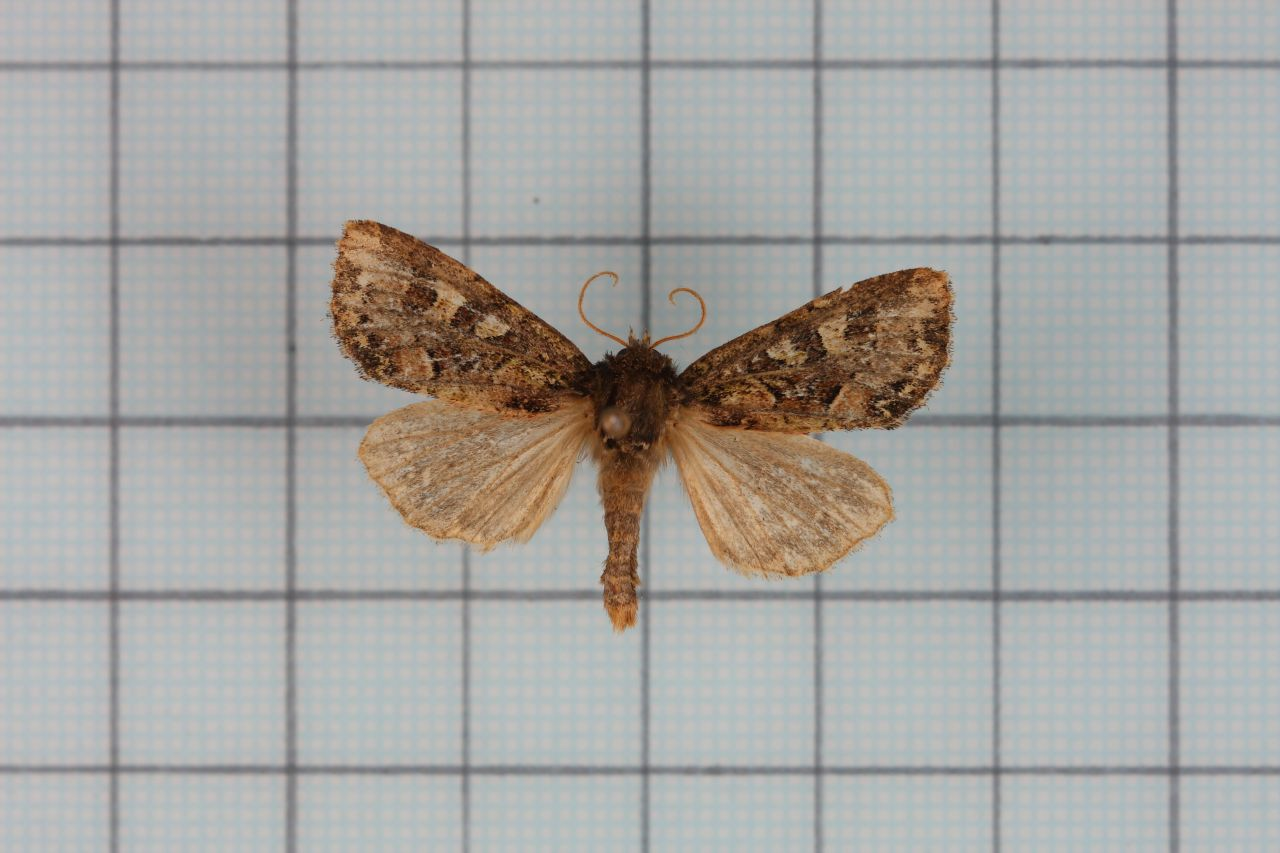

Scientific classification
- Kingdom: Animalia
- Phylum: Arthropoda
- Class: Insecta
- Order: Lepidoptera
- Superfamily: Noctuoidea
- Family: Noctuidae
- Genus: Atrachea
- Species: A. ochrotica

Binomial name
- Atrachea ochrotica (Hampson, 1910)

Synonyms
- Trachea ochrotica Hampson, 1910; Trachea mediifascia Wileman & South, 1917

= Atrachea ochrotica =

Species of moth

Atrachea ochrotica is a moth of the family Noctuidae first described by George Hampson in 1910. It is found in Taiwan and the Chinese province of Yunnan.
