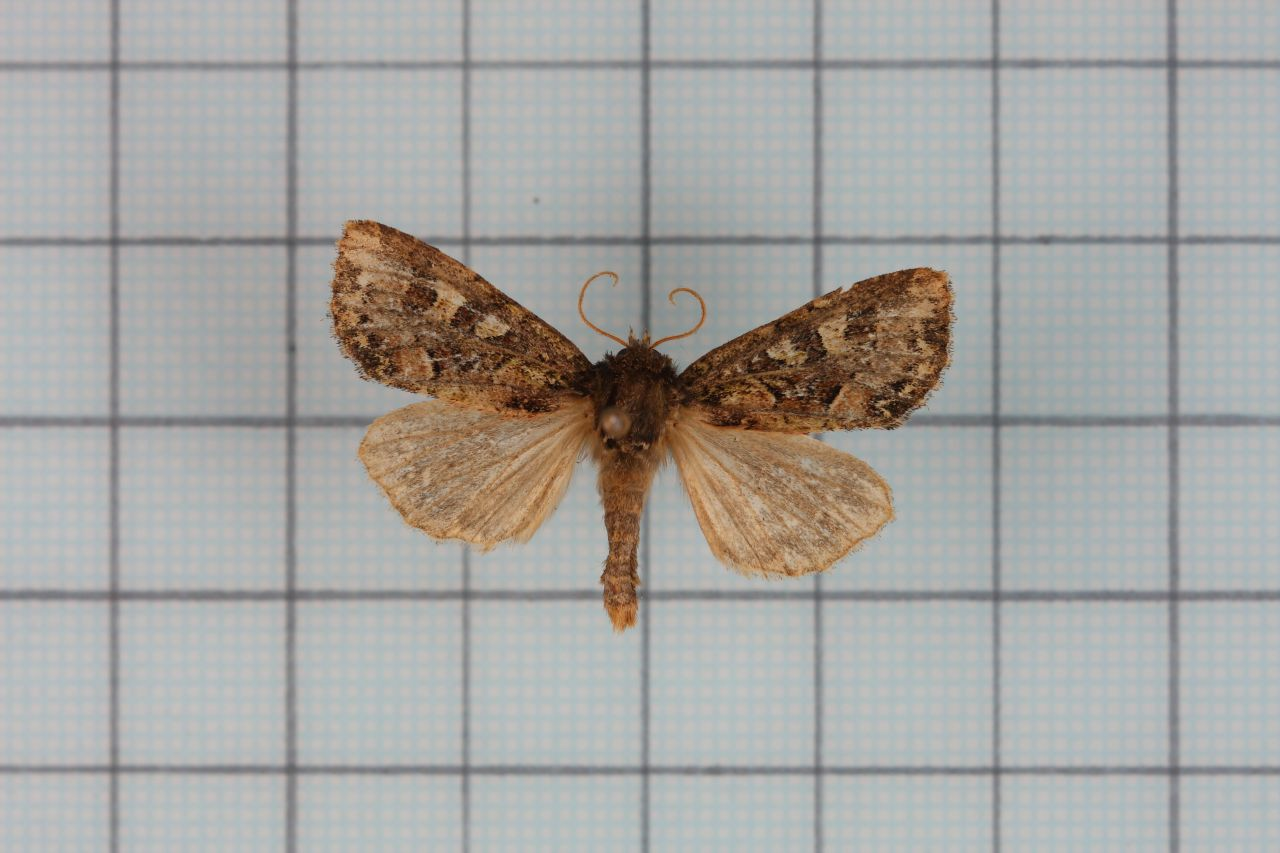

Scientific classification
- Domain: Eukaryota
- Kingdom: Animalia
- Phylum: Arthropoda
- Class: Insecta
- Order: Lepidoptera
- Superfamily: Noctuoidea
- Family: Noctuidae
- Subfamily: Acronictinae
- Genus: Atrachea; Warren, 1911

= Atrachea =

Genus of moths

Atrachea is a genus of moths of the family Noctuidae.

== Species ==
- Atrachea argillacea (Draudt, 1950)
- Atrachea miyakensis Sugi, 1963
- Atrachea nitens (Butler, 1878)
- Atrachea ochrotica (Hampson, 1910)
- Atrachea parvispina (Tschtverikov, 1904)
